= Angus Book Award =

Literary award for teenage fiction novels

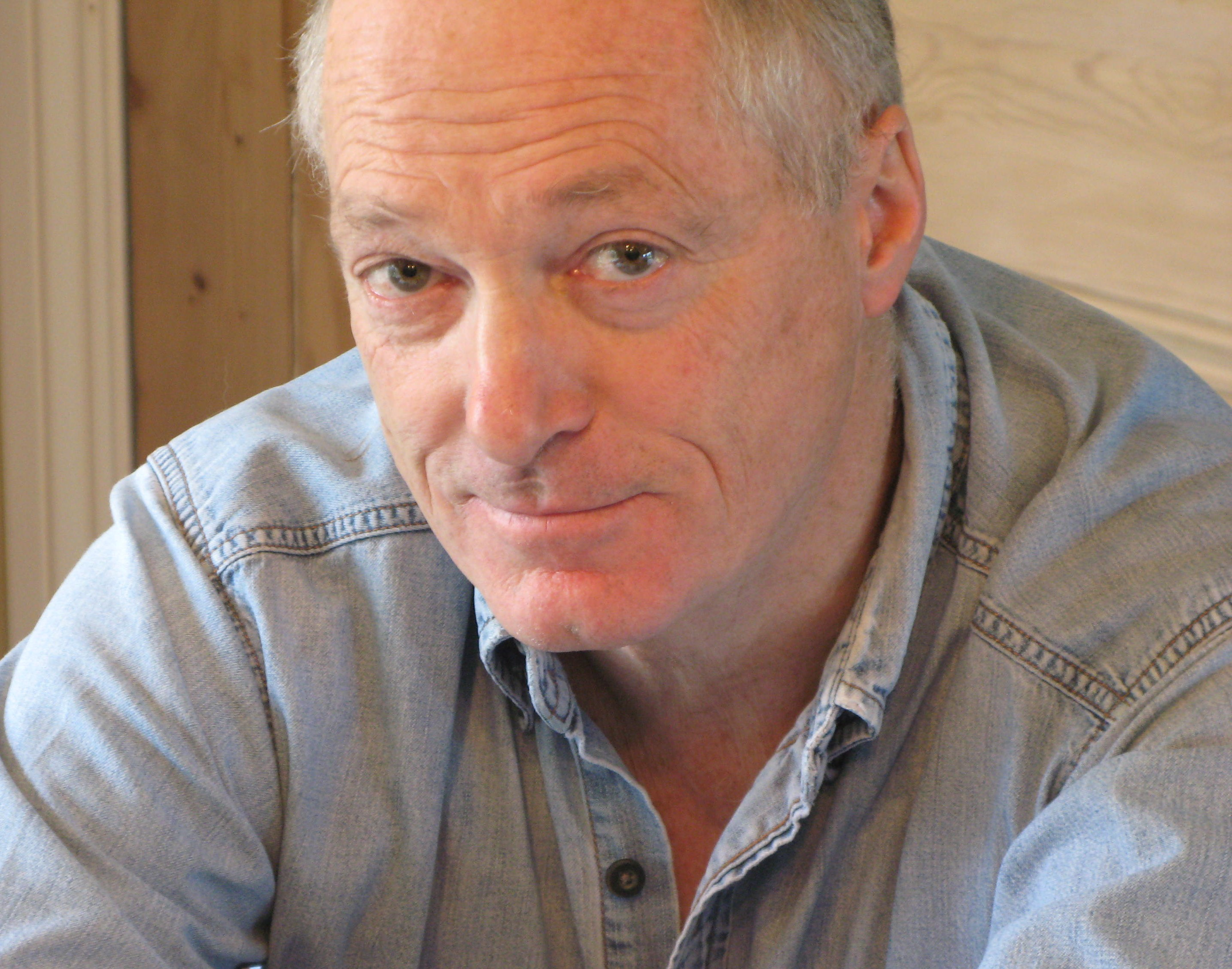
- Terence Blacker won the award in 2005 for his novel, Boy2Girl
- Awarded for: literary award for UK authors of teenage fiction
- Sponsored by: Angus Council in Scotland
- Date: 1996
- Country: Scotland

The Angus Book Award is a literary award for UK authors of teenage fiction. It is awarded by Angus Council in Scotland. The award is decided by the votes of the secondary schools in Angus. The pupils host the awards every year. The ceremony is hosted by a different school each year. For example, in 2007 the award was hosted in Arbroath High School by Christy Scott and Jason McNulty both of which were current third year pupils.

== Honorees ==
Angus Book Award winners and finalists
Year	Author	Title	Result	Ref.
1996	Sue Welford	The Night After Tomorrow	Winner	
1996	Theresa Breslin	Kezzie	Finalist	
1996	Melvin Burgess	The Baby and Fly Pie	Finalist	
1996	Christa Laird	But Can The Phoenix Sing?	Finalist	
1996	Maggie Prince	Memoirs of a Dangerous Alien	Finalist	
1997	Malcolm Rose	Tunnel Vision	Winner	
1997	Gillian Cross	New World	Finalist	
1997	Zoe Halliday	Brother Cat, Brother Man	Finalist	
1997	John Loveday	Goodbye Buffalo Sky	Finalist	
1997	Catherine MacPhail	Run, Zan, Run	Finalist	
1998	Robert Swindells	Unbeliever	Winner	
1998	Lynne Reid Banks	Broken Bridge	Finalist	
1998	Julie Bertagna	The Spark Gap	Finalist	
1998	Ann Halam	The Powerhouse	Finalist	
1998	Ian Strachan	Which Way Is Home?	Finalist	
1999	Tim Bowler	River Boy	Winner	
1999	Henrietta Branford	Chance of Safety	Finalist	
1999	Melvin Burgess	Tiger, Tiger	Finalist	
1999	Annie Campling	And The Stars Were Gold	Finalist	
1999	Michael Cronin	Against the Day	Finalist	
2000	Tim Bowler	Shadows	Winner	
2000	Bernard Ashley	Tiger Without Teeth	Finalist	
2000	Gillian Cross	Tightrope	Finalist	
2000	Anthony Masters	Days of the Dead	Finalist	
2000	Jenny Nimmo	The Rinaldi Ring	Finalist	
2001	Malcolm Rose	Plague	Winner	
2001	Catherine MacPhail	Missing	Finalist	
2001	Beverley Naidoo	The Other Side of Truth	Finalist	
2001	Celia Rees	Truth or Dare	Finalist	
2001	Hazel Riley	Thanis	Finalist	
2002	Bali Rai	(Un)arranged Marriage	Winner	
2002	Malachy Doyle	Georgie	Finalist	
2002	Carol Hedges	Jigsaw	Finalist	
2002	Anthony Horowitz	Stormbreaker	Finalist	
2002	Geraldine McCaughrean	The Kite Rider	Finalist	
2003	Keith Gray	Warehouse	Winner	
2003	Louise Cooper	Demon Crossing	Finalist	
2003	Alison Prince	Oranges and Murder	Finalist	
2003	Malcolm Rose	Bloodline	Finalist	
2003	Nicky Singer	Feather Boy	Finalist	
2004	Alan Gibbons	The Edge	Winner	
2004	Julie Bertagna	Exodus	Finalist	
2004	Keith Gray	Malarkey	Finalist	
2004	Philip Reeve	Mortal Engines	Finalist	
2004	Malcolm Rose	Clone	Finalist	
2005	Terence Blacker	Boy2Girl	Winner	
2005	Alison Allen-Gray	Unique	Finalist	
2005	Martin Chatterton	Michigan Moorcroft, R.I.P.	Finalist	
2005	Graham Gardner	Inventing Elliot	Finalist	
2005	Mark Roberts	Tomorrow Belongs to Me	Finalist	
2006	Graham Joyce	TWOC	Winner	
2006	Anne Cassidy	Looking For JJ	Finalist	
2006	Chris D'Lacey	Icefire	Finalist	
2006	Catherine Forde	Skarrs	Finalist	
2006	Beverley Naidoo	Web of Lies	Finalist	
2007	Kevin Brooks	Candy	Winner	
2007	Theresa Breslin	Divided City	Finalist	
2007	Alan Gibbons	Hold On	Finalist	
2007	Sue Mayfield	Damage	Finalist	
2007	Marcus Sedgwick	The Foreshadowing	Finalist	
2008	Kate Cann	Leaving Poppy	Winner	
2008	Sherry Ashworth	Close-Up	Finalist	
2008	J. A. Henderson	Bunker 10	Finalist	
2008	Graham Marks	Omega Place	Finalist	
2008	Anthony McGowan	Henry Tumour	Finalist	
2009	Anne Cassidy	Forget Me Not	Winner	
2009	Meg Rosoff	What I Was	Finalist	
2009	James Jauncey	The Witness	Finalist	
2009	J. A. Henderson	Crash	Finalist	
2010	Rachel Ward	Numbers	Winner	
2010	Kevin Brooks	Black Rabbit Summer	Finalist	
2010	Gillian Philip	Crossing the Line	Finalist	
2010	Anna Perera	Guantanamo Boy	Finalist	
2011	Keren David	When I Was Joe	Winner	
2012	Kevin Brooks	iBoy	Winner	
2013	Teri Terry	Slated	Winner	
2014	Matt Whyman	The Savages	Winner	
2015	Carmen Reid	Cross my Heart	Winner	
