= The Fire Within (novel) =

2001 novel by Chris D'Lacey

- The Fire Within (book 1)
- Author: Chris D'Lacey
- Language: English
- Series: The Last Dragon Chronicles
- Genre: Fantasy novel
- Publisher: Orchard Books
- Publication date: 2001
- Publication place: United Kingdom
- Media type: Print (Paperback), (Hardback)
- Pages: 340 pp
- ISBN: 1-84121-533-3
- OCLC: 56592628
- Followed by: Icefire

The Fire Within is a 2001 children's fantasy novel written by Chris d'Lacey. It is the first novel of The Last Dragon Chronicles, a low fantasy series about dragons in the modern world. The series continues with Icefire, Fire Star, The Fire Eternal, Dark Fire, Fire World, and The Fire Ascending.

The Fire Within takes place at Wayward Crescent, and it is about a 20-year-old man named David Rain, who tries to find out the mystery behind Liz and Lucy Pennykettle's relationship with dragons. He eventually becomes friends with them and learns the secrets of the dragons.

== Characters ==
Elizabeth Pennykettle (Liz) - The landlady who makes mysterious clay dragons that come to life. Her special dragon is Gwillan, who sheds his fire tear in Dark Fire.

Lucy Pennykettle - Liz's daughter, an 11-year-old girl who strongly believes in dragons, but can be very mischievous. She also loves squirrels and tries to find them. Her special dragon is Gwendolen. She also pushes David to write stories about squirrels and their adventures in Wayward Crescent.

David Rain - The main character of the series. He was just an ordinary 20-year-old man looking for a place to stay. David becomes Liz's tenant, and he goes to Scrubbley College. He has written a book called Snigger and the Nutbeast for Lucy's birthday. He also has a writing dragon named Gadzooks.

Gadzooks - David's clay dragon that helps him write. Gadzooks carries a notepad and pencil around with him for writing stories or notes.

Guinevere - Guinevere, a woman from the far past, caught Gawain's fire tear. She bore one daughter who carries the original fire and passes it down through the years. She is also an ancestor of Liz and Lucy Pennykettle.

Gwendolen - Guinevere's child, made from clay, flesh and blood. She is the ancestor of Suzanna Martindale (introduced in Icefire, 2nd book of the series).

Gwilanna - An evil sibyl who helps Guinevere and conjures Gwendolen for her.

Gawain - The last dragon who shed his fire tear for Guinevere.

Henry Bacon - The Pennykettle's next-door neighbour, a protagonist who attempts to help the Pennykettles, but, because of his ignorance, he often does the opposite.

Sophie Prentice - A girl who works at the animal shelter and becomes David's girlfriend

Greenfingers George (Mr. Digwell) - Scrubbley's gardener for the library gardens.

Conker - Lucy's favorite squirrel

Bonnington - The Pennykettle's cat

Caractacus - The crow which damaged Conker's eye and was the villain in David's book for Lucy.
