= Icefire (d'Lacey novel) =

2003 children's fantasy novel by Chris d'Lacey

- IceFire (book 2)
- Author: Chris d'Lacey
- Language: English
- Series: The Last Dragon Chronicles
- Genre: Fantasy novel
- Publisher: Orchard Books, an imprint of Scholastic Inc.
- Publication date: 1 October 2003
- Publication place: United Kingdom
- Media type: Print (Paperback), (Hardback)
- Pages: 421
- ISBN: 978-0-439-67246-7
- OCLC: 56567094
- LC Class: PZ7.D6475 Ic 2005
- Preceded by: The Fire Within
- Followed by: Fire Star

Icefire is a 2003 children's fantasy novel by English author Chris d'Lacey. It is the sequel to his 2001 novel The Fire Within. It is followed by Fire Star, The Fire Eternal, Dark Fire, Fire World and The Fire Ascending.

== Plot summary ==
David is frustrated that no one will publish his book. Lucy makes a wishing dragon, David's names it "G'reth" which Gadzooks his special dragon wrote down.

Liz offers to drive David to campus and David tells Liz that he thinks Sophie is going to allow him to move in with her. Dr. Bergstrom gives David an assignment on dragons and says the contest prize is a trip to the Arctic. Dr. Bergstrom gives him a talisman to hold and says it will show him his true path. David sees Gadzooks write the name "Lorel."

Later, Lucy, having wished for snow on G'reth, is making a snowman which looks somewhat like a bear. She comes in and looks in the freezer. Feeling curious, David finds Gruffen on a small container in the freezer and tries to pick him up, but Gruffen gets stuck on David's hands. Liz saves Gruffen from breaking just in time and shows David what is in the box—a snowball. It contains auma from Gawain's fire tear, which Liz uses to give life to her special dragons, but she simply tells David that she kept it as a memory like David's teddy bear.

== Characters ==
=== Humans/Hybrids ===
- Elizabeth Pennykettle (Liz) – David's landlady and the maker of the mysterious clay dragons that come to life. Her special dragon is Guinevere.
- Lucy Pennykettle – Liz's daughter, an 11-year-old girl who strongly believes in dragons but can be very mischievous, and really annoying. She also loves squirrels and hedgehogs and tries to find them. She can also make dragons. Her special dragon is Gwendolen. She also encourages, or "pushes" David to write stories on what animals are doing with their lives.
- David Rain – The main character of the series of seven books. David is Liz's tenant and he goes to Scrubbley College. He has written a book called Snigger and the Nutbeast and tries to publish it in this book. He has a writing dragon named Gadzooks and gets a new wishing dragon named G'reth. David has a girlfriend named Sophie who has moved to Africa for her job, and develops a relationship with Suzanna "Zanna" Martindale. David is very curious about Gawain's fire tear in this book and uses G'reth to try to find out more about it.
- Suzanna Martindale (Zanna) – Zanna is a Goth college student that falls in love with David and knows a great deal about dragons. She is a descendant of Gwendolen, and a girl with the markings of a sibyl (the Mark of Oomara). She becomes David's girlfriend. They both figure out things together piece by piece.
- Guinevere – Guinevere caught Gawain's fire tear in ages long past. David learns about her when Liz tells him her story. Guinevere left one daughter who carries the original fire and passes it down through the years. Ancestor of Liz Pennykettle and Lucy Pennykettle.
- Gwendolen – Guinevere's child, made from clay, flesh, and blood. The ancestor of Suzanna Martindale.
- Gwilanna – An evil sibyl who helps Guinevere and conjures her child Gwendolen for her. Gwilanna also puts a curse on Grockle to become a dragon instead of a boy. She is always trying to bring back the dragons in some devious way. She first appears using the alias "Aunty Gwyneth."
- Dr. Bergstrom – David's college professor. Has the ability to turn into a fantastic polar bear and is known as Thoran in his polar bear form. He was originally thought of as a ghost.
- Sophie – David's girlfriend who helped Lucy in the first book, The Fire Within, when they caught a couple of squirrels. In this book, she is away on a job at an African game reserve.
- Henry Bacon – Henry is the Pennykettle's next door neighbour. David has to stay with him while Gwilanna is staying in his room. Henry keeps a room full of stuff on polar bears and the Arctic and becomes an ally of the Pennykettles.

=== Dragons and creatures ===
- G'reth – The wishing dragon made by Lucy and is then given to David.
- Gawain – The last real dragon of the world and the father of Grockle.
- Grockle – The "son" of Elizabeth Pennykettle and Gawain the dragon, originally intended to be a human boy.
- Gretel – A potions dragon and the servant of Gwillana before becoming Zanna's dragon.
- Gadzooks (Zookie) – David's story writing dragon. They seem to share a powerful connection to the universe. Gadzooks was the first one to discover Lorel's presence. He tells David things on his pad helping him to write stories.
- Grace – Sophie's listening dragon, who plays an important part in this book and is traumatized in the near end.
- Gruffen – A guard dragon of the Dragon's Den. he is always not where he is supposed to be.
- Gwillan – A puffer dragon, he enjoys cleaning, and watering plants for Liz.
- Spikey – An albino hedgehog.
- Ragnar – One of the legendary polar bears who has fighting scars all over him. He is said to have roared so loudly that a tooth came out of his mouth, and he pounded it into the ice and formed the island called the Tooth of Ragnar.
- Lorel – An ancient polar bear that is known as the Teller of Ways and tries to reach David to give him more information on the Fire Tear.
- Bonnington – The Pennykettle's cat who inherits a few dragon skills after drinking some of the melted icefire. He is also a mischief maker.

== Reception ==
Beth L. Meister, writing for School Library Journal, compared Icefire to early books in the series, noting that the novel "offers a darker and more mature story" than The Fire Within. Further, Meister found that "Liz's clay dragons develop a greater degree of realism within the story, and their background is further explored".
