= Lawless and Tilley series =

Crime novel series

The Lawless and Tilley books are a series of crime novels by British author Malcolm Rose. The stories follow the investigations of a scientifically minded, university graduate and fast track detective DI Brett Lawless and his partner, the athletic, art-loving DS Clare Tilley. As with many of Rose's books, it is set in the North of England, in Sheffield. Also a common feature in Rose's books, science often pays a key role in catching criminals.

The seventh book, Flying Blind, ended with the breaking of Lawless and Tilley's partnership. Since it was published in 1999 there have been no more books in the series.

== Characters ==
Brett Lawless - An aptly named detective who reached the rank of detective inspector unusually fast due to his degree in biochemistry. This led to resentment from some members of the team who were skeptical of his lack of experience. However, Brett soon proved them wrong by demonstrating how his scientific know-how could help crack cases faster.

Clare Tilley - The detective sergeant who found herself paired with the new DI, Clare provides a balance to his science with her understanding of people. She is also a passionate lover of art and literature as well as a black belt in karate, all of which have come in useful in cases.

== Books ==
- The Secrets of the Dead
- Deep Waters
- Magic Eye
- Still Life
- Fire and Water
- Lethal Harvest
- Flying Blind
