= Graham Gardner =

British writer

Graham Gardner is the Librarian at Abingdon School (near Oxford, UK) and author of the novel Inventing Elliot. He was born and brought up in the county of Worcestershire, England, and is the second eldest of ten children. From 2009 to 2014 he was in charge of library services at St Marylebone School in central London, which featured in the London Evening Standards " Get London Reading Campaign" and for which he co-wrote a history of the school.

== Inventing Elliot ==
His début novel Inventing Elliot, about bullying and self-invention, was published in the UK by Orion Children's Books in 2003. In 2004, Inventing Elliot was published in the US by Dial, an imprint of Penguin Books, and has since been translated into over 10 languages, including German, French, Greek, Polish, Spanish, Albanian and Korean. The book has been shortlisted for many prizes, including the Angus Book Award and the Branford Boase Award, and won the Deutscher Jugendliteraturpreis (German Youth Literature Prize) .

== Academic research ==
For more than ten years, Graham Gardner was an academic researcher, based at Aberystwyth University on the coast of West Wales, from where gained his PhD in 2003. During this time, he worked with Dr Bill Edwards and Dr Michael Woods on a study of civic participation in market towns funded by the Economic and Social Research Council, a review of community and town councils in Wales commissioned by the Welsh Assembly Government, several studies of the economy and society of rural Wales for the Wales Rural Observatory, and a review of the Quality Parish and Town Council Scheme commissioned by the Department for the Environment, Food and Rural Affairs. As an extension of this work, he subsequently advised the Department for Communities and Local Government (CLG) on the appropriateness and likely impact of giving parish and town councils in England a new general power to promote wellbeing.

Between 2006 and 2009, he was a research fellow funded by the UK Research Councils (RCUK) studying citizenship, governance and local politics, with a focus on forging links between academic research, national public policy and local practice. His main concern in this role was with the significance of citizen empowerment for democracy, wellbeing and social justice, and his attempts to challenge mainstream thinking on the impact and potential implications of New Labour's 'new localism' agenda frequently caused controversy. His writing on local empowerment appeared in national newspapers and magazines, including the Guardian, Local Council Review, MJ and Clearway, and he regularly addressed policy and practitioner audiences. In recognition of his contribution to debates over empowerment and localism, he has been profiled by Regeneration and Renewal magazine and made a Fellow of the Royal Society for the Arts (FRSA).
