= The Last Dragon Chronicles =

Children's fantasy novels

- The Fire Within; Icefire; Fire Star; The Fire Eternal; Dark Fire; Fire World; The Fire Ascending; Rain and Fire (A Guide to the Last Dragon Chronicles)
- Author: Chris d'Lacey
- Cover artist: Angelo Rinaldi
- Country: United Kingdom
- Language: English
- Genre: Fantasy, Children's
- Published: 2001–2012
- Media type: Print (hardback & paperback)
- Followed by: Dragons of Wayward Crescent

The Last Dragon Chronicles is a series of seven children's fantasy novels written by Chris d'Lacey. The books follow a college student, David Rain, as he discovers the existence of living clay dragons in the house he lodges at. This series currently includes the novels:

- The Fire Within (2001)
- Icefire (2003)
- Fire Star (2005)
- The Fire Eternal (2007)
- Dark Fire (2009)
- Rain and Fire (2010) - a guide book (written by d'Lacey's wife, Jay) containing an accumulation of knowledge concerning the series, also containing a preface detailing David's trip from Blackburn to Scrubbley before the novel. The book also contains a sneak-peek for Fire World.
- Fire World (2011)
- The Fire Ascending (2013)

== Plot ==
In The Fire Within, David Rain is a tenant of Elizabeth (Liz) Pennykettle (a potter who makes clay dragons) and her daughter, Lucy. However, there is something mysterious about Liz, the house, and the dragons. As for what it is, David can't figure out. Meanwhile, David is trying to help Lucy find a missing squirrel named Conker. Conker, unlike the other squirrels, does not leave after the tree he lived in was cut down, his eye is badly injured and the doctors try to rescue him, but unfortunately he dies. While he tries to unravel the dragon mysteries and save the squirrel, David writes a story for Lucy about Snigger (another squirrel), Conker and Lucy's other squirrel friends. However, the story begins to mirror real life. Whatever is going on, it has something to do with his special writing dragon Gadzooks, whom Liz made as a housewarming gift. But when Conker's life is threatened and Gadzooks appears to be in trouble, David is forced to believe the impossible if he is going to save them. Meanwhile, he finds himself drawn to an attractive wildlife rescuer.

In Icefire, Lucy creates a new dragon named G'reth. He is a wishing dragon that can grant wishes that would benefit dragon kind. David becomes the owner of this dragon because he was the one who named him (with Gadzook's help). But fate seems to be dictating an unusual course for David when his college tutor, Dr. Bergstrom, sets him an essay on the existence – or not – of dragons. The tantalising prize is a fully funded research trip to the Arctic, which seems just within his grasp. David starts to research the subject and soon discovers a connection between dragons and the Arctic. Then, evidence begins to mount that somewhere in the neighbourhood is a polar bear. Beginning to wonder whether it is only a coincidence or could deeper forces be at work, David begins to uncover more about the dragons. He finds himself drawn to a time when dragons really did exist, and their secrets were guarded by the polar bears of the Arctic. David must open his mind to the legend of dragons if he is going to have any chance of winning the research trip. Meanwhile, the evil sibyl, Gwilanna, appears with an evil plot, and the secret of the dragons is revealed. If she is to be defeated, David must discover the link between an ancient legend about the fire tear of the last dragon, Gawain, and the frozen north. The keys to solving the puzzle are his new girlfriend, Zanna, and Dr. Bergstrom, who proves to have more mysteries than meets the eye.

In Fire Star, Gwilanna, the evil sibyl that first starred in Icefire, returns. She plans to reincarnate the last dragon, Gawain, and use him to open a portal to the dragon dimension Ki:mera. If she succeeds, the concentrated fire of all those dragons will be released onto an unstable Arctic, already threatened by global warming and in no need of any more heat to push it over the brink. The wishing dragon G'reth is whisked to another dimension by mysterious forces and brought back with an entity that calls itself the Fain. Meanwhile, David and Zanna are on the trip they won to the Arctic, and David is writing another book, an epic book about dragons, polar bears, and a mysterious fire star. But when the book, like the one he wrote before, starts to mirror real life, and when Zanna is kidnapped and presumably killed by polar bears, the expedition is cut short. Back at home, he arrives to find Lucy has been kidnapped by Gwilanna for a ritual to raise the last dragon Gawain. Zanna is proved to be alive and learning the ways of the Inuit in a small village. Then, Gwillana's plans are revealed by a twist of fate that reunites Liz with her former husband Arthur, who is using a powerful relic of Gawain to affect the flow of time. In the dramatic climax, David, Zanna, Arthur, the Pennykettles and the clay dragons have to side with a polar bear army to stop Gwilanna, as well as a darker evil from the past of Ki:mera and Earth. There is however, a final twist, David is stabbed by one of the Ix controlled humans on the expedition with a shard of ice and supposedly 'dies.'

In The Fire Eternal it has been five years since David, now a cult author, mysteriously disappeared in the Arctic. Life in Wayward Crescent has settled to relative normality. But as the weather grows wild and the ice caps melt, all eyes turn north, where bears and the souls of the Inuit dead are combining to produce a spectacular solution...a solution with its focus on David and Zanna's child, Alexa. By this time, Lucy has grown to about the age of 16, and meets a reporter named Tam Farrell who is doing an article on the author David who supposedly went missing in the arctic. At the end, David reveals that he, in fact, was not dead, but combined with the dragon, Gawain, and his fire tear.

In Dark Fire David is ordered by the elder dragons of Ki:mera to seek out and destroy a spark of dark fire, even though doing so will mean sacrificing the beloved housework dragon, Gwillan. Also, David's first girlfriend, Sophie, died in Africa while David was there trying to stop a mutation called a darkling from destroying the entire facility. He uses Gwillan's and Grace's fire tears to attempt to revive the fallen clay dragons back to their original selves. As David struggles to reach a compromise, dragons all over the world begin to wake, and the Earth enters a new Dragon Age. But just as this is to happen, the dangerous Ix:cluster reverse the Fire Eternal during an epic battle between the dragon queen and our heroes, and the villainous Ix:cluster, and in a single moment, Gadzooks ends with writing the word 'sometimes' in dragontongue, the language of the dragons.

In Fire World, a 12-year-old boy named David lives in Co:pern:ica. He and his friend Rosanna spend their days in the librarium, a museum for books, with the curator, Mr. Henry, and the mysterious firebirds that roam the upper levels. When the two friends accidentally injure one of the firebirds, they find themselves on a remarkable and dangerous adventure. The evil Ix have found a way into Co:pern:ica from their home planet and have taken over a firebird, turning it to the side of darkness. The firebirds have a secret, though: they know about dragons. With the help of David and Rosanna, the firebirds must reach across the universe to call on the dragons for protection. But will the dragons arrive before the Ix destroy everything?

The entire series is resolved with a seventh novel named The Fire Ascending. The novel reveals that the entire universe is made up of the word and symbol Oomara, meaning sometimes. This last book shows Alexa's part in the series. It also shows how Alexa came to be. This entire series is ended with the final battle: the polar bears and the dragons vs. the Ix and the darklings.

== Main characters ==
David Rain – main character. A college student who lives with the Pennykettles. He is an author whose stories magically manage to come true and he gets his inspiration from his writing dragon, Gadzooks (see: Pennykettle dragons). In Fire Star, he made GollyGosh, a natural healing dragon. Another one of his dragons is G'reth, a wishing dragon made by Lucy Pennykettle. David turns out to be a "Fain", although at the start, he doesn't know that himself. He has the ability to transform into a polar bear, and has "illuminated" with the adolescent dragon, Grockle, Liz's completely-dragon child, whom his girlfriend Zanna quickened earlier on in the series. He has a daughter by Zanna named Alexa. In addition, David becomes a dragon when he extends his Fain into Grockle.

Elizabeth "Liz" Pennykettle – A woman probably in her thirties who makes dragons out of clay and sells them at pottery fairs. She made all of the Pennykettle dragons except Golly and G'reth. According to Gwilanna, she happens to have more auma than most other daughters of Guinevere, which is actually because she has Icefire. She is the mother of Lucy Pennykettle, wife of the blinded ex-monk Arthur, and landlady of David Rain. According to David, the Fain (the alien species) meant for Liz and Arthur to be his biological parents, but when Gwilanna interrupted this plan, David materialized at age 20 at the "necessary" time. Liz is pregnant with a boy at the end of "Dark Fire" by her husband, Arthur. Gwilanna originally says that the child will not have "dragon" in him, but after the boy manages to refrain from being affected by the dark fire Liz absorbed, her interest regarding the boy piques.

Lucy Pennykettle – Liz's eleven-year-old daughter. She is the youngest of Guinevere's (see: other characters) known line and the next "dragon princess". At the beginning of Icefire, she made an extremely effective wishing dragon called G'reth, which is surprising for a girl of her age, as proper wishing dragons are extremely hard to make. When David returns, she is sixteen. In "The Fire Eternal" she communicates several times with a journalist by the name of Tam, who she admits to being in love with in her journal in "Dark Fire." She is the one to awaken the Dragon Queen Gawain, the mother of Gawain. She likes Tam and her idol is David because he wrote Snigger and the Nutbeast for her twelfth birthday.

Gwilanna/Aunty Gwyneth – Lucy's "aunt". She is a very powerful sibyl who was once served by Gretel, the potions dragon. She kidnaps Lucy to help her raise Gawain, the dragon, from his state of paralysis so that she could be "illuminated" with it (become one with it) like she believed her mother, one of the pre:men, should have been able to do before the Fain executed her. She is frozen in a block of ice in the shape of a crow with her powers are stripped from her, though they are restored later on. She has been the midwife of all of Guinevere's line, as only a sibyl can do so. Liz Pennykettle has a great amount of respect for her, despite the fact that on numerous occasions the "aunt" has almost killed her, kidnapped her daughter, trapped her tenant under some floorboards, as well as a myriad of other feats of similar creed. This may be because Gwilanna birthed her daughter, and has also saved Liz's life on numerous accounts.

Sophie Prentice – David's first girlfriend who dies in Dark Fire. First appears in The Fire Within as a veterinarian working at The Wildlife Hospital. Also tried to help them when Conker, one of Lucy's squirrels, was injured.

Suzanna "Zanna" Martindale – A character that first appears in Icefire and becomes David's girlfriend. She is a college student like David, as well as, in the beginning, a Goth. When Gretel stops serving Gwilanna, Gretel becomes Zanna's dragon. Zanna is a sibyl like Gwilanna but she is not as powerful. She is at times very zany and amusing. She is also the mother of David's child, Alexa. She bears the mark of Oomara on her forearm, which grants her many abilities, one of which being the ability to transform into a raven. She lived with the Pennykettles for five years, but then was given a house by the deceased Henry Bacon (who conveniently resided next door), and both she and her daughter relocated there.

Alexa Martindale – David and Zanna's daughter. It is later revealed that she is to become an "angel". She can also draw the future. Because her father is a Fain and her mother a sibyl, she has quite a lot of power and is extremely intelligent. It is of Arthur's belief that before her birth into the human world, she acted as a muse to describe to Arthur who she wanted her father to be. When Arthur wrote about the man who was originally destined to be his son, the past "changed," creating David so that Alexa could be born.

Dr. Bergstrom – A geography teacher at Scrubbley College. He is Scandinavian, can turn into a polar bear, and has a dragon called Groyne who can become invisible and shape-shift. He started out as a polar research scientist and met the spirit of Thoran, the first polar bear ever. People believed he was killed, but he actually became a mixture of man and polar bear.

Henry Bacon – The Pennykettles' neighbor that dies in Dark Fire from a stroke. In Icefire, he shows David the picture of his grandfather on an expedition to the Arctic. It shows his grandfather with several other people, one of whom David identifies as Dr. Bergstrom. Before his death, he often helped the Pennykettles and David. His sister is a sibyl.

Tam Farrell – A journalist who has the spirits of two bears, Avrel and Kailar, in his hands. He first appears in The Fire Eternal when he tries to get information about David. He later becomes a friend and rescues Lucy from the Ix.
