= Chris d'Lacey =

English writer of children's fiction

- Born: 15 December 1954 (age 71); Valletta, Malta
- Occupation: Author
- Spouse: Jean Michelle D'Lacey
- Writing career
- Genres: Children's fiction Fantasy
- Notable works: The Fire Within; Icefire; Fire Star; The Fire Eternal; Dark Fire; Fire World; The Fire Ascending
- Website: icefire.co.uk

Chris D'Lacey (born 15 December 1954) is an English writer of children's fiction, he is best known for writing The Last Dragon Chronicles. He has also written many other books including A Dark Inheritance.

== Biography ==
Chris D'Lacey was born in Valletta, Malta, but as a child moved first to Leicester and then to Bolton. After gaining a degree in biology from the University of York, he returned to Leicester and got a job at the University of Leicester in the Pre-Clinical Sciences department.

Originally his writing was confined to songs and he didn't turn to fiction until he was 32. His first piece of work was a 250,000 word story about polar bears for his wife, Jay, to accompany a stuffed polar bear he had bought her as a Christmas present.

He didn't write another story for seven years, until he heard about a competition to write a story for young children with a prize of £2,000. The resulting book, A Hole at the Pole, also about polar bears, didn't win – but he sent it off to a publisher, who accepted it.

His first children's novel, Fly, Cherokee, Fly, was published in 1998 and subsequently shortlisted for the Carnegie Medal. It was inspired by the time he found an injured pigeon in Victoria Park and nursed it back to health at home. After recovering, it lived another 14 years freely coming and going from a nest box attached to the back of the house. All of its offspring were given the names of different Native American tribes, which is where the title of the book comes from.

He has since written over twenty children's books, including Pawnee Warrior (a sequel to Fly, Cherokee, Fly), a collaborative novel with fellow children's author Linda Newbery (From E To You), and the best-selling, award-winning The Last Dragon Chronicles and "The Erth Dragons." His books often contain environmental themes and events based on things that have happened to him.

In July 2002 he was awarded an honorary doctorate from the University of Leicester for his contributions to children's literature. Although writing is now his main source of income, he still works at the university as the operator of the confocal microscope.

His favorite children's books are the Paddington Bear series and The Hobbit, and his favorite children's authors are Allan Ahlberg and Roald Dahl.

== Awards and nominations ==
- 1998 Fly, Cherokee, Fly shortlisted for the Carnegie Medal
- 2002 The Fire Within won the Rotherham Children's Book Award
- 2002 Honorary doctorate from the University of Leicester
- 2005 Horace shortlisted for the Bolton Children's Book Award
- 2005 Horace shortlisted for the Hampshire Book Award
- 2006 Icefire shortlisted for the Angus Book Award
- 2010 Gruffen won the Books Factor Award.
