= Carol Hedges =

British author

Carol Hedges is a British author of books for children, young adults and adults. Her novel Jigsaw, about a teenager's suicide, was shortlisted for the Angus Book Award and nominated for the Carnegie Medal in 2001. Her most recent works are the Spy Girl series for teenagers and the Diamonds & Dust adult mystery series, published by Crooked Cat and featuring the Victorian detectives Leo Stride and Jack Cully.

She lives in Hertfordshire with her husband and grown-up daughter.

== Books ==
- Ring of Silver, Lord of Time (1992)
- Guardian Angel (1993)
- Three's a Crowd (1994)
- There's More to Life than Pizza (1995)
- Check It Out! with Mark (1996)
- Red Velvet (2001)
- Jigsaw (2001)
- Bright Angel (2003)
- Spy Girl: The Other Side of Midnight (2005)
- Spy Girl: Out of the Shadows (2006)
- Spy Girl: Once Upon a Crime (2007)
- Spy Girl: Dead Man Talking (2008)
- Jigsaw Pieces (2012), ebook
- Diamonds & Dust (2013)
- Honour & Obey (2014)
