= Anne Cassidy =

British writer (born 1952)

- Born: 1952 (age 73–74); London, England
- Occupation: Writer
- Writing career
- Genre: Crime fiction
- Notable awards: Booktrust Teenage Prize (2004); Angus Book Award (2009)

Anne Cassidy (born 1952) is a British writer best known for her crime fiction for young adults.

She was born in London. She worked in a bank for five years and then worked for several years as a teacher. She began writing in 1989 and published her first book Big Girls' Shoes in 1991. Cassidy has been described as "Ruth Rendell for teenagers". Her own favourite crime fiction authors include Rendell, Ian Rankin, Lawrence Block and James Lee Burke. She has also written several books for younger readers.

Her 2004 book Looking for JJ won the Booktrust Teenage Prize. It also appeared on the shortlists for the Whitbread Book Awards and the Carnegie Medal. The book was adapted into a play.

== Selected work ==
- A Family Affair (1995), first book in the East End Murder series
- Accidental Death (1997)
- Missing Judy (2002)
- Love Letters (2003)
- The Story of My Life (2006)
- Forget Me Not (2008), won the Angus Book Award
- Just Jealous (2009)
- Heart Burn (2011)
- Finding Jennifer Jones (2014), a sequel to Looking for JJ
- Ben's Rocket (2015)
- No Virgin (2016)
