= Malcolm Rose =

British young adult author (born 1953)

- Born: 1953 (age 72–73); Coventry
- Occupations: Author, lecturer
- Writing career
- Genres: Detective, murder mystery, thriller
- Notable works: Traces, Lawless & Tilley
- Website: www.malcolmrose.co.uk

Malcolm Rose (born 1953) is a British young adult author. Many of his books, including the Traces and Lawless and Tilley series, are mysteries or thrillers where the hero uses science to catch the criminal or terrorist.

== Biography ==
Malcolm Rose was born in Coventry in 1953. He studied chemistry at the University of York. Before 1996 Malcolm was a Chemistry lecturer for the Open University and many of his books have a chemistry connection. While working as a lecturer, Malcolm was also writing several of his earlier books (Rift, The OBTUSE Experiment, The Higher Form of Killing, Son of Pete Flude) and now although mainly an author he still does some chemistry lectures and visits schools. He is married to wife, Barbara, and has a son, Colin, born 1982.

As well as writing, Malcolm regularly makes visits to schools, libraries and various other venues.

== Awards and commendations ==
The first book of the Traces series, Framed!, has been selected by the United States Board on Books for Young People and the Children's Book Council as an Outstanding International Book for 2006. The Highest Form of Killing was nominated for an Edgar Award. Both The OBTUSE Experiment and Tunnel Vision were commended by the Young Book Trust. Tunnel Vision and Plague received the Angus Book Award, and also won the Lancashire Children's Book of the Year Award.

== Bibliography ==
Traces series

- Framed!
- Lost Bullet
- Roll Call
- Double Check
- Final Lap
- Blood Brother
- Murder Club (Only available as an eBook)

Lawless and Tilley series

- The Secrets of the Dead
- Deep Waters
- Magic Eye
- Still Life
- Fire and Water
- Lethal Harvest
- Flying Blind

Other novels

- Asteroid
- Hurricane Force
- The Death Gene
- Transplant
- Clone
- Plague of death
- Bloodline (published as Lab 47 in German)
- The Tortured Wood
- Son of Pete Flude
- Breathing Fear
- Rift
- The Highest Form of Killing
- Formula for Murder
- Four Degrees More
- The Alibi
- The Smoking Gun
- Kiss of Death
- Forbidden Island
- Jordan Stryker: Bionic Agent
- Jordan Stryker: Cyber Terror
