= Leaving Poppy =

2006 novel by Kate Cann

- Author: Kate Cann
- Language: English
- Genre: Children's
- Publisher: Scholastic
- Publication date: 3 July 2006
- Publication place: United Kingdom
- Pages: 352
- ISBN: 978-0-439-96871-3
- OCLC: 68262006

Leaving Poppy is a 2006 young adult thriller/horror novel by Kate Cann. It won the 2008 Angus Book Award and was shortlisted for the 2007 Booktrust Teenage Prize.

== Plot ==
Leaving Poppy is split into three parts.

=== Part one ===
The story starts with a girl, the main protagonist 'Amber' arriving at a house on Merral Road. She's unsure that it's the right house, as many others she tried weren't right. After entering the house that she begins to think back about her mother and half-sister Poppy, she thinks back to various previous events such as Amber's birthday which Poppy ruined. Amber had told her mother that she was going on holiday, but she found the house (17 Merral Road) on a flat sharing website, intending to stay there, telling her mother later by phone. Poppy is obviously a disturbed and emotionally unstable child from the beginning, she "cries all the time... refusing to eat." Amber saw herself moving as abandoning them.

She meets Rory, who helps her with her case, which she promptly unpacks. Later she meets the rest of her housemates: Ben, Chrissie and Kaz. After eating the meal Ben had prepared that night, she asks about finding a job, determined she'll find one tomorrow. Amber had lied to them all, she wasn't ever on a gap year and never had a broken relationship. Upstairs Amber sees 'dust shapes', but thinks nothing of it.

Amber recounts more of Poppy's previous actions and her bizarre relationship with her mother. Poppy acts violently, hurting another girl, then runs into her mother's bed leaving Poppy and their mother crying. Their mother refuses to admit that anything is Poppy's fault. The next day Amber looks for a job in many cafes and bars but can't find one. She eventually finds a cafe she loves and keeps asking for a job. She makes an apple crumble as a trial and eventually gets the job. The owner of the cafe (The Albatross) is Bert and the other cook is Marty. That night Amber wakes many times, because of the window rattling. After a day at work, Amber decides to get fit. On the way to number 17 she bumps into an old woman from 11 Merral Road, talking to her about where in the house she lives, mentioning the attic. She leaves Amber asking her why the last person left the house. Amber, thinking she's crazy quickly goes into the house. When heading up the stairs Amber thinks she sees the dust shadow again in the large ornate Edwardian mirror on the landing. She heads up to the attics, to find 2/3 of them full of junk. As she enters the last attic, Amber begins to notice things such as the iron bed and the wooden rocking chair, seem to falter and fade, so she eaves the attic quickly.

Amber asks about the previous housemate who left and gets the answer that she just wanted a change. She asks Ben if old things can have an 'atmosphere' but doesn't tell him what happened in the attic. That night when she goes to bed she keeps telling herself not to go crazy. She dreams one of her 'guilt dreams,' where she leaves Poppy. The next day Amber leaves work and tells her housemates that she'll cook the next meal. Amber forgets to phone her mother once again like she promised, and upon doing so it seems that her mother had called the police and they'd laughed at her. The conversation ends with Amber saying sorry. "...she'd said she felt sorry so many times that the word had lost all meaning." Amber has 2 days off work, she spends the first drunk and sleeps happily, and the second hanging around with Kaz talking. Sunday night she is awoken by the 'fixed' window rattling again. She scavenges a rug, radio and other items from the first 2 attics, not going near the 3rd. Her room "didn't feel quite right..." Amber gets into the routine of going to the phone box every day after work to call her mother. Her mother keeps her updated about Poppy; she'd only managed 2 days of college since Amber left and is deeply depressed. Amber scavenges some raw fish from Bert and cooks a meal that goes down well with everyone. Amber phones her mother, finally telling her she's not coming back. Her mother sees this as abandoning her, saying she cares for no-one but herself.

She notices her throat becoming sore, and reveals that her mother doesn't trust doctors and she gets tonsillitis twice a year. Kaz says she'll make the next meal, obviously attracted to Rory playfully flirting. Amber goes to bed; the darkness upstairs doesn't seem right and she keeps telling herself not to get ill.

The next day at work, Bert reveals that Marty is involved with a girl he met in the summer, and Amber's heart sinks. On the way home she meets the old woman again, who seems to warn her not to go into the house, and not to sleep in her room. She enters no. 17 and asks Ben to fix her window, then sleeps on her bed. Amber wakes, sure Poppy is in the room with her, sitting on the bed like she does; she could feel the pressure on the bed. The shape disappears and Amber tries to get back to sleep. She hears a high pitch complaining like Poppy but different, then she hears an eerie noise, wood on wood - the old rocking chair in the attic.

Next morning Amber tries to convince herself it was a dream. Looking in the mirror again she sees the dust shape, only thinner this time, also her reflection seems to waver and move. After Kaz's meal, Kaz and Rory have a playfight with one of the old cushions. In the scuffle it's torn apart and everyone recoils in horror. Fingers of hair poke out the pillow, melted together with pins. Inside are 3 small teeth, from a child. Amber hears that Kaz had seen and heard exactly what she had seen and heard but she says nothing. Kaz wedged the rocking chair with books, haunted by the noises at night. Part 1 ends with "everything going dark" leaving the reader uncertain of what happens next.

== Part two ==
In part two, Amber wakes up in a hospital wing, to find both her mother and her sister there with her. Her housemate Kaz talks to her about them and Amber confides in her although she leaves out the weird feelings she has about the house as Kaz has experienced them and dismisses it all as imagination to make herself feel better. Kaz then reveals that Amber's mum and Poppy are going to be staying at the house with them until Amber gets better.

Poppy moves up into the attic room and both are helpful with the guests. When Poppy reveals that she is uneasy about being in the attic, Amber gets all the more worried. Both mum and Poppy are helpful around the house and give Amber gifts, in order to bribe her to let Poppy stay at the house instead of going home. Poppy gives Amber gloves and Amber is repulsed by them, refusing to wear them. She later finds out that Poppy got the gloves from a chest in the attic room she is staying in.
