= Traces series =

Novel series by Malcolm Rose

Traces
- Framed!; Lost Bullet; Roll Call; Double Check; Final Lap; Blood Brother; Murder Club
- Author: Malcolm Rose
- Language: English
- Genre: Mystery
- Publisher: Kingfisher
- Published: 2005–2009
- Media type: Print (hardcover and paperback), e-book
- No. of books: 7

Traces is a series of novels written by British author Malcolm Rose, about the adventures of Forensic Investigator Luke Harding and his Mobile Aid To Law And Crime, Malc. The first book, Framed!, has been selected by the United States Board on Books for Young People and the Children's Book Council as an Outstanding International Book for 2006.

Six books of the series were published between 2005 and 2007 by Kingfisher Books in the UK and by Turtleback Books in the US. All six books, plus a seventh, Murder Club (2013), have since been published by the author on Amazon Kindle.

== Alternate England ==
The Traces universe is explicitly located in a future England, where the decayed and semi-abandoned South is supported and feared by the vibrant, successful North.

England is somewhat a benevolent dictatorship, but the dictator is a computer system. The country is run by the unnamed and generally benign Authorities, who remove children permanently from their parents at the age of five, to be raised in residential schools until they graduate. At this time they will take up the employment they have been training for. Adults are paired for life at the direction of the Authorities: partners are selected by local Pairing Committees based on age and aptitudes. The pairing is generally announced in mid-teens and Pairing takes place at the age of twenty. Most people are content to accept the direction given, but a recurring theme in the books is Luke Harding's dissatisfaction with the Pairing Committee system. As a scientist, when he reaches twenty he is to be paired with biologist Georgia Bowie despite his wish to be with musician and close friend Jade Vernon. Their struggle to be together is a central part of several of the storylines. Whether they will be paired is uncertain, but seemingly unlikely. Jade has played a significant part in multiple stories, but as a Forensic Investigator, most of Luke's work is in the Southern slums, while Jade's work is in the cultural centres of the North.

The reader gradually realises that other than a few, rare, white-skinned people, most people have brown skin. Common pets such as cats and dogs are near extinction. Smoking is illegal. Transportation of almost everything is either by plane, by autobarge or by automated cab system (cabs running on freeways across the nation, similar to the Personal Rapid Transit systems proposed in many places but much more advanced). Also, children select their future jobs in year 8 of education, similar but not the same to a present-day Year One or Two student's "Options" where he or she picks his or her GCSE subjects, specializing on a more general scale.

== Novels in the series ==
=== #1 Framed ===
Luke Harding is a newly qualified forensic investigator; he is given his first case, to solve the mystery of the deaths in his school – where Luke himself is the main suspect. Luke struggles to catch the killer, but eventually finds them.

=== #2 Lost Bullet ===
Only 16 years old, Luke Harding is the youngest person ever to qualify for the position of the forensic investigator. In the slums of London, Luke and his robotic sidekick, Malc (Mobile Aid to Law and Crime), investigate a doctor's murder. They find a bullet wound to her head, but rain has washed away the bullet and the rest of the clues. As more innocent victims die, pressure builds on Luke and Malc to find the culprit before the bizarre shooting spree becomes a complete massacre.

=== #3 Roll Call ===
Luke Harding's third thrilling case involves a series of mysterious murders in which the victims seem to have only one thing in common -- the same name, Emily Wonder. In the bitter cold of winter, the teenage forensic investigator and his robotic assistant, Malc, investigate the three crime scenes and struggle to identify the murder weapons used, as no traces have been left behind. When a young homeless girl named Emily Wonder is reported missing, Luke and Malc rush back to the slums of London to try to save her from the murderer-and from a giant tidal wave that threatens to destroy the city.

=== #4 Double Check ===
Everton Kohter is awaiting execution for murder when Luke Harding is tipped off that he is innocent. Luke wants to reopen the case, but the Authorities want him to investigate a suspected Pairing Committee fraud instead. Against the ticking clock, Luke and Malc chase all leads, including a freak electrical storm, a plane crash and several more murders.

=== #5 Final Lap ===
Luke Harding will need all of his skill and resources to tackle his action-packed fifth case. Set in the highly competitive world of professional track and field, Luke and Malc are tested to their limits with a series of intriguing, mysterious events. Pushed to the edge, can Luke beat his opponent to the finish and solve the case before something else goes wrong?

=== #6 Blood Brother ===
Luke and Malc discover a large number of fatalities at a hospital. He finds his long-lost father there in connection with the crimes. Luke's father is then named a suspect because of his DNA matching traces found in all of the victims' rooms.

=== #7 Murder Club ===
(This book is only available as an e-book) Forensic Investigator Luke Harding has left York Hospital after surgery on his damaged brain. Before he is fully fit, he is given a new case – and a new Mobile Aid to Law and Crime. It is not a difficult investigation. He soon learns who strangled Kiki Smallpiece, a young and controversial worker for The Authorities. But why was she killed? Was the murderer really responsible when his fingers tightened around her neck? And if not, who was really behind her death? Has her fate got anything to do with The Authorities? And why has Luke been told to investigate when he is still suffering the after-effects of surgery? There is another question on Luke's mind. Will The Authorities finally allow him to be paired with his girlfriend, Jade Vernon?
