= Kate Cann =

English author

- Born: 1954 (age 71–72)
- Education: University of Kent (BA, 1977; MA, 1978)
- Occupation: author of fiction

Kate Cann (born 1954) is an English author of fiction.

== Biography ==
Cann wrote stories and diaries in her youth. She received a Bachelor of Arts in English from the University of Kent in 1977, then a Master of Arts in American Literature from the same university in 1978.

In the 1980s, Cann began work as a copy-editor for the publishing house, Time Life Books. When working on a piece of young adult fiction, she decided she could write a better work. Later in life, she recalled, "got bitten by the 'I can do better than this' bug, and started writing... it took me over". Once Diving In (1983?) was published, she began writing full-time.

Kate Cann resides in Wiltshire.

== Sources and themes ==
Cann kept a diary from which she drew from experiences. By the time she "ran out of material from my diaries and memories, I realised that my daughter and son were teenagers, and started eavesdropping on them and their friends".

A prime motivator of her writing was the way "teenage books...treated sexual relationships: they were either full of gloom and doom, or were gushy, unrealistic candyfloss". Kate offers by contrast a certain verismo: "I focus on the real things that don't change - like love and anger and happiness and jealousy".

A secondary, but almost equally important theme in her work is the struggle against the (often subtly) controlling figure. This may be a boyfriend who is 'a control freak. Scared to let us have differences'; a "Best Friend" for imitation - 'I flattered her, I...mirrored her and buoyed her up'; or a parent like the heroine's mother in Hard Cash: 'A real living breathing human vampire. She's feeding off you...turning on the emotional blackmail at full power'. Alternatively, the controlling force - "denying the separateness of the other" - may be a group cult, whether a formal one (Speeding) or an informal subculture, like the hero's 'bond to the team...their triumphant, tribal energy' in Leader of the Pack.

Such controlling powers may be seen as externalisations of the adolescent's quest for identity achievement, in the face of both inner and outer obstacles. Cann's protagonists, under both social and sexual pressures, regularly face the alternative peril of identity diffusion: 'You're not you any longer, you're what he wants you to be. A shadow person, a non-person, no centre, no wholeness. Just a limp hotchpotch of what someone else once wanted you to be'.

Despite such dangers, Cann's own predilection remains nonetheless firmly for engagement with life, or "diving in". Even when her heroes do temporarily trade in their own identities for an externally formulated one, whether "a dream of money" or a social group, "the team and everything," the books typically conclude with phrases such as, "Well, I don't wish it hadn't happened," or "I'm glad I was part of it. It's part of me now... and I'm glad about that too".

== Awards and honours ==
Awards for Cann's writing
Year	Title	Award	Result	Ref.
2007	Leaving Poppy	Booktrust Teenage Prize	Shortlist	
2008	Leaving Poppy	Angus Book Award	Winner	

== Publications ==
=== Young adult fiction ===
- Caught in the Act (1997)
- Too Hot to Handle (1997)
- Breaking Up (2001)
- Shop Dead (2001)
- Text Game (2004)
- Leaving Poppy (2006)
- Leader of the Pack (2008)
- Witch Crag (2012)

==== Art & Coll series ====
- Diving In (1996)
- In the Deep End (1997)
- Sink or Swim (2001)
- Art History (2009)

==== Beach series ====
- Grecian Holiday: Or, How I Turned Down the Best Possible Thing Only to Have the Time of My Life (1999)
- Spanish Holiday: Or, How I Transformed the Worst Vacation Ever into the Best Summer of My Life (2001)
- California Holiday: Or, How the World's Worst Summer Job Gave Me a Great New Life (2003)
- Mediterranean Holiday: Or, How I Moved to a Tiny Island and Found the Love of My Life (2007)

==== Crow Girl series ====
- Crow Girl (2005)
- Crow Girl Returns (2006)
- Crow Girl Rises (2012)

==== Hard Cash trilogy ====
- Hard Cash (2001)
- Shacked Up (2001)
- Speeding (2004)

==== Rayne books ====
- Possessed (2008)
- Consumed (2009)

=== Young adult non-fiction ===
- Living in the World, illustrated by Derek Matthews (1996)
