= Inventing Elliot =

2003 young adult novel by Graham Gardner

- 2003 cover
- Author: Graham Gardner
- Illustrator: Graham Gardner
- Language: English
- Series: Realistic Fiction
- Genre: Young adult realistic fiction
- Publisher: Orion Children's Books
- Publication date: March 2003
- Publication place: United Kingdom
- Media type: Print
- Pages: 183 pp
- ISBN: 1-84255-263-5

Inventing Elliot is a 2003 young adult novel by Graham Gardner. It is about a young teenager who decides to become a different person and ends up being invited to join a secret society which is orchestrating a reign of terror at his new school. Since its first publication by Orion Children's Books it has been translated into more than ten languages and become a worldwide critically acclaimed bestseller.

== Setting ==
Inventing Elliot is set in England, where Elliot lives with his mother and his father who has just been in a serious trauma. The main action takes place at a fictional school, Holminster High. Contrary to what some reviewers have said, Holminster High is a state school, not a private school.

== Themes ==
Inventing Elliot is a book about the ways in which most people lie about what they think and feel in order to fit in, and the extent to which that lying can compromise psychological integrity and emotional wellbeing. The clue is in the title: Inventing Elliot. The protagonist, Elliot, hides his real self, which he believes will attract unwelcome attention, behind a veneer of 'cool'. Inside, however, he is terrified and vulnerable. At various points during the story Elliot thinks of himself as wearing a 'mask', and a sympathetic teacher refers to 'the armour' that most people put on each day. The book was inspired by the experiences of the author, although the story is fiction rather than autobiography.

A secondary theme of the book might be 'unintended consequences', perhaps with the underlying 'message' of 'Be Careful What You Wish For'. Elliot wishes that he could fit in with the people in his school, but in doing this he allows evil to happen, risks becoming a bully himself, and ends up losing the two real friends that he has.

== Influences ==
The book is extremely influenced by the novel Nineteen Eighty-Four by George Orwell, a story about a totalitarian state in which the government is attempting to eliminate freedom of thought. Like Winston Smith, the hero of Nineteen Eighty-Four, Elliot struggles to hide what he really thinks and feels, and is terrified of the truth coming out, yet also longs to be free. Holminster High is effectively ruled by a single organization, just like the fictional country of Airstrip One in Nineteen Eighty-Four. The key 'villain' of Inventing Elliot bases his strategy on ideas taken from Nineteen Eighty-Four.

Another important influence is The Chocolate War, a controversial novel for young adults written by the US writer Robert Cormier. Graham Gardner has said that he could not have written Inventing Elliot in the way that he did without the lead set by The Chocolate War. The two books are similar in that they both feature a school ruled by a secret society, but also very different because of the contrasting actions of their respective protagonists. The protagonist of The Chocolate War is a boy who decides to take a stand against conformity; he 'dares to disturb the universe'. In contrast, the central character of Inventing Elliot; makes an active effort to conform, to fit in. Both characters suffer, but in very different ways and for very different reasons. The boy from The Chocolate War is innocent; before he makes his stand, he does not understand that his actions will represent a real threat to those in power, and that no one will support him. Elliot is far from being innocent: he knows just what the stakes are and what he must do in order to survive, and he uses that knowledge to his advantage.

== Awards ==
Translated into 10 languages, including French, German, Spanish, Greek, Albanian, Korean and Dutch, Inventing Elliot has been a worldwide bestseller and received widespread critical acclaim.

In the UK, Inventing Elliot was short-listed for six prizes, including the Branford Boase Award, given to the best debut novel for children, and the Angus Book Award. The Sunday Times called it 'gripping and gritty', the Financial Times described it as 'taut and compelling', and Time Out magazine deemed it one of the top five novels of 2003. The Scotsman, The Guardian and Books for Keeps included it amongst their top ten teenage reads for 2003, whilst The Scotsman also named it 'debut of the year'.

In the U.S., Inventing Elliot was nominated for the American Library Association's Best Young Adult Book Award 2004, the Nutmeg Prize and the Heartland Award, whilst New York Public Library has made it a 'book for the teen age' and critic Patty Campbell has described it as 'stunning' and 'heartrending'.

In 2005, Inventing Elliot won the Youth Jury Award of the Deutscher Jugendliteraturpreis, Germany's most prestigious honour for children's books, voted for by young people aged 11–17 across Germany. The prize is given to books judged to be of 'outstanding' literary merit and that encourage young people to read. National German newspaper Die Zeit described Inventing Elliot – German title, Im Schatten Der Wächter (In the Shadow of the Guardians) – as a story 'told with amazing intensity'. Critic Hans Peter Roentgen called it 'a disturbing chronicle of power, force and seduction.

Inventing Elliot has since been shortlisted for Belgium's Farniente prize (2006) and Holland's Kinderjury prize (2008).

== Publication history ==
The UK edition of Inventing Elliot first published in the UK as a hardback by Orion Children's Books in 2003. A trade paperback followed in 2004. The US edition, published by Dial, an imprint of Penguin Putnam, appeared in hardback in 2004, then in paperback a year later. Inventing Elliot has been translated into 10 languages, including French, German, Spanish, Greek, Korean, Dutch and Polish.

== Quotes ==
"Stand out in the wrong way, you're dead." pp. 68

"Don't make the mistake of thinking you know me from what you see." pp. 90

"Put on the mask. Act the part. Survive." pp. 90

"I survived. I survived being killed. But inside, I was already dead. But if you're dead, you can't feel... But how about now?" pp. 170.

“you can’t hurt me I’m already dead”

"Please let me never wake up. That way, all this will go away. Or let me wake up and make it four years ago." pp. 174.

GREEN FN
