= Carmen Reid =

Scottish novelist

Carmen Reid is a Scottish novelist born in Montrose, Angus. She is the author of the Annie Valentine series of novels about a personal shopper and other books in the chick lit genre, including the Sunday Times top ten bestseller Did The Earth Move?. She also wrote the Secrets at St Jude's series of young adult novels set at a girls boarding school in Edinburgh. In 2015, her World War II novel for teenagers Cross My Heart won the Angus Book Award.

== Novels ==
=== Non-series novels ===
- Three in a Bed (2002) Corgi Books
- Did The Earth Move? (2003) Corgi Books
- How Was It For You? (2004) Corgi Books
- Up All Night (2005) Corgi Books
- The Jewels of Manhattan (2011) Corgi Books
- Cross My Heart (2013) Corgi Books
- Worn Out Wife Seeks New Life (2021) Boldwood Books
- New Family Required (2022) Boldwood Books
- The Woman Who Ran for the Hills (2023) Boldwood Books

=== Annie Valentine novels ===
1. The Personal Shopper (2007) Corgi Books / republished (2022) Boldwood Books
2. Late Night Shopping (2008) Corgi Books / republished (2022) Boldwood Books
3. How Not to Shop (2009) Corgi Books / republished (2022) Boldwood Books
4. Celebrity Shopper (2010) Corgi Books / republished (2022) Boldwood Books
5. New York Valentine (2011) Corgi Books / republished (2023) Boldwood Books
6. Shopping with the Enemy (2012) Corgi Books / republished (2023) Boldwood Books
7. Annie in Paris (2024) Boldwood Books

=== Secrets at St Jude's ===
1. New Girl (2008) Corgi Books
2. Jealous Girl (2009) Corgi Books
3. Drama Girl (2010) Corgi Books
4. Rebel Girl (2010) Corgi Books
5. Sunshine Girl (2011) Corgi Books
6. Party Girl (2012) Corgi Books
