= Dark Fire (The Last Dragon Chronicles) =

Book by Chris d'Lacey

- First edition
- Author: Chris d'Lacey
- Cover artist: Angelo Rinaldi
- Language: English
- Series: The Last Dragon Chronicles
- Subject: Dragons
- Genre: Fantasy novel
- Publisher: Orchard Books, an imprint of Scholastic Inc.
- Publication date: July 2009 (UK), May 1st, 2010 (US)
- Publication place: United Kingdom
- Media type: Print (Hardback)
- Pages: 567
- ISBN: 978-1-84616-954-0
- OCLC: 319210568
- Preceded by: The Fire Eternal
- Followed by: Fire World

Dark Fire is the fifth book in The Last Dragon Chronicles by Chris d'Lacey. It was released on 2 July 2009 in the UK and was published on May 1, 2010 for the US.

== Plot ==
Three young adults named Arthur, Lucy and Elizabeth were traveling to meet Rupert Steiner, who had received a note from Gadzooks. The word "Scuffenbury" was written in Dragontonge, which is the name of one of the barrows which are said to contain a dragons. Back in their home town, Wayward Crescent, David asks Zanna, David's girlfriend, for more information about Gwilanna. This is where Gwillanna is threatening to hand over the Dark Fire Tear to IX. She had the choice to sacrifice her husband while being threatened, but Zanna was used for David's place. The summoning of the dragon Ghislaine, Gwilanna summoned a darkling. David and Zanna get home one night and discover their neighbor, Henry Bacon, is in the hospital due to a stroke. Liz and Lucy are at the hospital and David gets a letter. He learns about the Scuffenbury. David goes with Liz to visit Henry in hospital, and Henry dies during their visit. After Henry dies, Gwilanna, attends the funeral and gives a warning to David that she will do anything to get her hands on the obsidian and the Dark Fire. The group meet Henry's sister Agatha, a powerful sibyl. They also discover that Henry has left Liz and Lucy $50,000, and left David his collection of Arctic memorabilia and Zanna his house. The will also says that the Arctic would be left in place. After this, Agatha(a Sybil) teaches Zanna healing magicks and suggests that she make her peace with David.

Zanna goes into town with Alexa and Gretel to open her shop, but on the way the group are attacked by the semi-Darkling flock and are rescued by Tam, who destroys them with the spirit Kailar. Zanna was hurt, but uses her new healing knowledge to mend the wound. Tam talks to David about Rupert Steiner, who has come to him with a story about translations of the dragontongue found on the Glacier expedition. Lucy told David that Sophie emailed her, trying to talk to him, and David leaves for Africa. Lucy then receives a phone call from an old friend, Melanie Cartwright, who has seen a video of a Pennykettle dragon moving on TV and is concerned over her own “special” dragon, Glade. David gets to Africa and finds Sophie's wildlife sanctuary on fire. Grockle extinguishes the fire. Sophie was killed and Grace is preparing to cry her Fire Tear. The semi-Darkling which began the fire is still alive. He was planning on inverting Grace's tear to create dark fire. Pieter, Sophie's fiancé, tries to kill it, but it kills him instead. David then distracts the Darkling with the dark fire he already has, captures it and sends it back to the IX with a warning to leave the Pennykettle dragons alone. Mutu, one of Sophie's college roommates, tells David that he saw a woman dancing in the flames. David then leaves Africa, taking with him Grace's stone body. Her Fire Tear was caught by Groyne during the struggle.

When he returns home. David informs Zanna that Alexa is a new species. She is an angel, a bridge between dragons and mankind and when the dragons are revealed, people everywhere will want to be like her. He also tells her that the people will travel to Ki:mera. This is the Fain's home world.

In the Dragon's Den, David gathers the dragons in an attempt to convert the dark fire and return it to Gwillan. Gollygosh will extract the dark fire from the obsidian, Groyne will mix it with Grace's Fire Tear and some icefire to neutralize it, and G'reth will wish for Gwillan and Grace to be reanimated. However, while David explains what will happen, Gollygosh is momentarily corrupted by the dark fire, and releases it early. The Dark Fire then enters Liz and her baby and she is knocked out. While Zanna tends to her, He then sends Lucy with Tam to Scuffenbury. Not noticing that, in the Dragon's Den, Gwillan is draining Grace's auma into himself. Lucy and Tam travel to Scuffenbury. On the way, Lucy reads the article about the last meeting of dragons. This is how eleven of the last twelve dragons shed half of their fire tears, then went into stasis, while the twelfth, Gawaine, ingested all eleven tears and planned to use them to defeat the Ix. Lucy and Tam arrive at their guesthouse, which is run by Hannah and Clive, and has one other guest, Mrs Gee. They climb Glissington Tor, the dragon's burial site, that evening, and that night Lucy has a nightmare about a cat, which she encountered earlier in the day, bringing her a semi-darkling.

In the Crescent, Liz is comatose, but unharmed. When Gwillan suddenly wakes up, Melanie Cartwright comes to visit with her mother, Rachel, and dragon, Glade, who can sense moods. Gretel puts the humans to sleep so they don't get in the way, and Glade goes upstairs to try and check on Liz and the baby. She finds that Liz is all right, but the baby's body is in stasis, and its auma has been transferred to Gwillan. The Cartwrights leave, and David contacts G'Oreal, informing him that Grockle is destroying the semi-Darklings. Early next morning, Tam and Lucy climb Scuffenbury Hill to see the unicorn. While they are there, cairn stones, the remains of a monument on Glissington Tor, begin to rise from the earth and rebuild the cairn, revealing more chalk carvings - a unicorn's horn. Mrs Gee, a sibyl, has rebuilt the cairn to try and wake the unicorn and the dragon, but Hannah, who claims to know all the Tor's secrets, warns her that this legend is false, and waking the dragon requires a red-haired girl, touched by the spirit of a dragon. She also explains that the dragon in stasis is Gawaine, who came to Scuffenbury looking for the unicorn Teramelle's healing to help her give birth, and offers to help Mrs Gee claim the dragon in return for one of its scales.

Gwendolen, left in the hotel to watch for the mysterious cat, is shocked to discover that not only is the cat real, it can do magic, and communicate. It tells her it is truly a girl called Bella, who was turned into a cat by Mrs Gee. The TV news is showing pictures of dragons being freed all over the world, and Hannah tells Lucy that she can wake the dragon if she touches it and sings - and that there is a tunnel under the cairn which will let Lucy touch the dragon.

At Wayward Crescent, Zanna is puzzled by e-mails Lucy is receiving, which David tells her are from other daughters of Guinevere. He also gives her Tam's article, telling her that Gawaine, the dragon in Scuffenbury and the one chosen to fight the IX, was Gawain's mother, and her plan to destroy the IX was to draw the IX to her, then sacrifice herself in the Fire Eternal, a plan which the new Wearle has adopted. Tam and Lucy travel through the tunnels to wake Gawaine, but as the dragon stirs, Hannah betrays them. Tam is trapped underground, and Lucy captured by Mrs Gee, but Bella helps her escape. In the chaos of the dragon's awakening, Mrs Gee, Hannah and Clive are all killed and the hotel collapses. Meanwhile, Melanie and Rachel Cartwright are attacked by the last surviving semi-Darkling, who injures both of them before taking Glade. Glade sends a distress signal to the Pennykettles, which is intercepted by Gwillan.

Lucy calls David for help, and he sends Grockle. With his help, Lucy places some of her tears in Glissington cairn, although Bella tries to stop her. The tears reflect moonlight onto the unicorn's horn, bringing it to life, and it frees Gawaine. However, as Zanna discovers through an email Bella sent Lucy, Gawaine was betrayed and one of her children murdered by a sibyl disguised as a red-haired maiden, and when she sees Lucy, she attacks. Grockle fails to defend Lucy, but, as Lucy is Gawaine's kin, the flames do not harm her, and Gawine is distracted for long enough that David can arrive to help.

Meanwhile, the last surviving semi-Darkling ingests Lucy's auma from the tears she left at Glissington Cairn. It uses the power in the tears to renew itself, and call the Ix towards it, and a full Darkling is born, with the ability to self-replicate, which it does until there are four Darklings. Realizing the danger, David gives Lucy the narwhal tusk talisman which he thinks is Groyne so that she can be transported home, not realizing that the tusk is in fact Gwillan, who has taken Groyne's abilities, and Lucy has only been moved across the valley.

Gawaine and G'lant - the combined force of David and Grockle - begin to fight the Darklings. One invades Gawaine's mind before she destroys it, but G'lant restores her before permanent injury can occur. One then distracts G'lant while the remaining two attack Gawaine. One destroys her wing and poisons her blood, although it is near-fatally injured in the attempt, and falls to the ground near Lucy, who has been joined by Bella. As it attempts to attack the girls, Tam emerges from the ground and destroys it. Zane contacts Agatha Bacon but instead Gwilanna arrives at Wayward Crescent, and Zanna leaves for Scuffenbury after . She arrives near Gawaine, who is gravely injured, and begins trying to heal her with Teramelle's help. The unicorn warns her to hurry, as Scuffenbury is the site of a portal to the Fire Eternal, and the portal will soon open. Meanwhile, Gwilanna, who wishes to deliver Liz's child. She refuses to listen when Arthur explains that Gwillan now possesses the child's auma. She uses a spell to trap Arthur in an armoire and, with the use of Gawain's iscoscele, draws the dark fire out of Liz. The dark fire turns Gawain's isoscele black, then proceeds to kill Gwilanna before traveling to Scuffenbury. Alexa, who was locked outside by Gwilanna, grows full wings and is then taken by G'Oreal of the New Wearle to Scuffenbury.

At Scuffenbury, G'lant continues to fight the two remaining Darklings. Gwillan traps one, purifying its auma and turning it into a dragon, which is no longer any threat. At the sight of Gwillan, the Ix lend all their power to the remaining Darkling, and it overpowers G'lant, but Gawaine drags it into the Fire Eternal, sacrificing herself to save G'lant and fulfill the task the Old Wearle entrusted her with - eradicating the Ix. Teramelle, invaded by the dark fire, follows her.

In the chaos which the dark fire causes, David, Zanna, Alexa and Gadzooks come together, and Gadzooks begins writing a word. David reassures Zanna that everything will be all right, but things will be different. Then David, Lucy, Tam, Zanna, Bella and the assembled dragons disappear. The book ends with the word Gadzooks was writing, "sometimes".

== Characters ==
=== Humans ===
- David Rain - An author who spent five years in Ki:mera, the Fain world, or dark matter, and is now discovered that he is a Fain. The Fain intended for him to be born to Liz and Arthur. Because of Gwilanna, this was prevented. He was simply materialized when Arthur wrote with the blood from the claw of Gawain. He is illumined with Grockle, and is called G'lant when fused with him. He was thought to be killed by an ice spear through his heart. He can also become a polar bear, called Ingavar. He has four dragons: Gadzooks, Gollygosh, Groyne and G'reth .
- Zanna Martindale - A sibyl with healing powers. Alexa's mother and David's fiancée, who is bitter about his disappearance. She owns a natural healing shop. Gretel is her dragon.
- Alexa - Zanna and David's daughter, an 'angel' who bridges the gap between humans and dragons. She makes a horse which magically turns into a unicorn.
- Elizabeth (Liz) Pennykettle - A daughter of Guinevere who makes animated dragons out of clay. The secret is Ice Fire who Thoran gave her. During the end of the Fire Eternal and throughout Dark Fire, she is pregnant with her son, Joseph Henry. She enters a coma when the dark fire enters her womb, and does not wake for the rest of the book. All the dragons obey her commands. They are her dragons.
- Lucy Pennykettle - Liz's daughter, a daughter of Guinevere who wakes Gawaine. She is in love with Tam, and idolizes David. Gwendolen is her dragon.
- Arthur Merriman - A physics professor, Liz's partner, and Joseph Henry's father. He was blinded by an encounter with the Ix in Fire Star. Has a claw from Gwillane with infinity ink.
- Tam Farrell - A reporter for The National Endeavor who shares the aumas of Kailar and Avrel. He has the power to turn things into ice.
- Joseph Henry - Liz's unborn child. He transfers his auma to Gwillan and puts his human body in stasis. He demonstrates incredible power at the end of the book by turning a darkling into a dragon.
- Gwilanna - A sibyl desperate to be illuminated to a dragon. She is killed by the Dark Fire at the end of the book. She disguises herself as Agatha Bacon to trick the Pennykettles.
- Rupert Steiner - Arthur's colleague, who translates Dragontongue in pictures taken on the Hella glacier expedition.
- Melanie Cartwright - Lucy's old friend. Glade is her dragon.
- Rachel Cartwright - Melanie's mother, injured by the last semi-darkling when he captures Glade.
- Sophie Prentice - David's ex-girlfriend, who is killed in a fire started by one of the semi-darklings at the animal sanctuary where she works. Grace is her dragon.
- Pieter - Sophie's fiancée, killed by a semi-darkling while trying to avenge her.
- Mutu - One of Sophie's colleagues.
- Henry Bacon - The Pennykettle's neighbour, he dies at the beginning of the book and leaves his house to Zanna.
- Agatha Bacon - Henry Bacon's sister, a powerful sibyl who helps Zanna. During her appearance at the end of the book, she is really Gwillana in disguise.
- Bella - A daughter of Guinevere turned into a cat by Ms. Gee. She knows the legend of Gawaine, and tries to stop Lucy from waking the dragon who will want revenge on a red-haired girl.
- Ms. Gee - A sibyl who has travelled to Scuffenbury with Bella to 'claim' Gawaine. Killed when Gawaine awakes by Hannah's ancestor and dragon urine.
- Hannah - A believer in dragons who knows the secret of waking Gawaine, and betrays Lucy to Mrs. Gee. Killed when Gawaine awakes.
- Clive - A believer who assists Hannah running the hotel. Killed by Mrs Gee when Gawaine awakes.
- Teramelle - A unicorn who tries to heal Gawaine, and entered stasis with her. Also known as the Scuffenbury Horse.

=== The IX ===
- The semi-darklings - Created during Gwilanna's attempt to raise the spirit of Ghislaine, eleven darkling/raven hybrids who work for the Ix. They are hunted down and all but one killed by Grockle.
- The darklings - Born at the end of this book from the last of the semi-darklings, the Ix try to use them to destroy Gawaine and G'lant, but ultimately fail.

=== Dragons ===
- The Old Wearle - The last twelve dragons of the last Dragon Age. Includes Galen, Gessine, G'larne, Gyrrhon and Gawaine.
- Gawaine - A dragon matriarch, chosen by the Old Wearle to destroy the Ix but forced to enter stasis in Scuffenbury after giving birth. She is released at the end of the book, and dies destroying the Ix.
- Gawain - Gawaine's son, and Liz and Lucy's ancestor.
- The New Wearle - A new gathering of dragons assisted by the Fain. Includes G'Oreal, David and Grockle (known as G'lant), an unidentified purple reader and an unidentified white dragon and two unidentified red dragons.
- G'Oreal - The leader of the New Wearle.
- Grockle - A dragon born at the end of Icefire. He is illuminated with David, and together they are known as G'lant.
- Godith - The god of all dragons. She created the universe, and is the mother of all dragons.
- The Pennykettle dragons:
  - Gwillan - A house dragon who shed his Fire Tear at the end of The Fire Eternal, creating the dark fire. He is reanimated by being combined with Joseph Henry, and demonstrates incredible power at the end of the book by turning a darkling into a dragon.
  - Gollygosh Golightly - A natural healing dragon created by David who releases the dark fire from the obsidian and it accidentally enters Liz's baby.
  - Gorin - A mysterious dragon that can catch fire which is impervious to himself.
  - Groyne - David's dragon, who can turn invisible or become a narwhal tusk talisman.
  - Gadzooks - David's dragon, who can manipulate dark matter by writing. During this book, he is working for G'Oreal.
  - G'reth - David's dragon, a wishing dragon created by Lucy Pennykettle.
  - Grace - Sophie's dragon, a listener who sheds her Fire Tear after Sophie's death but is reanimated by David after a failed attempt to raise Gwillan.
  - Glade - Melanie Cartwright's dragon, who can sense moods. She is captured and badly injured by the last of the semi-darklings.
  - Gretel - Zanna's potions dragon, who assists her when healing. Made by Liz, but used to belong to Gwilanna
  - Gwendolen - Lucy's IT dragon. Can plug into her computer to give or get information
  - Guinevere - Liz's dragon, helps kiln every Pennykettle dragon.
  - Gawain - Liz's dragon, created in the image of the real Gawain, and is present at the kilning of every Pennykettle dragon.

== External sources ==
- Icefire website
