= Julie Bertagna =

Scottish author

- Born: 1962 (age 63–64); Kilmarnock, Ayrshire, Scotland
- Occupation: Novelist
- Writing career
- Genres: Real life, science fiction
- Notable work: Exodus
- Website: juliebertagna.com

Julie Bertagna (born 1962) is a Scottish author who has written real life and science fiction novels for children and young adults. Her books have been shortlisted for several literature awards, including the Carnegie Medal. Her novel Exodus was the winner of the Lancashire County Library Children's Book of the Year Award. Soundtrack, her second novel for young adults, won a Scottish Arts Council Award, the second highest award ever given to a Scottish children's writer.

== Biography ==
Bertagna was born in Kilmarnock, Ayrshire, and moved to Glasgow when she was seven years old.

After receiving an MA Hons in English Language and Literature at the University of Glasgow she worked as an editor for a small magazine. She then moved into teaching before working as a freelance journalist for various publications. She published her first book, The Spark Gap, when she was 25 years old.

She currently writes full-time and lives in the West End of Glasgow with her husband Riccardo and young daughter.

== Influences ==
Bertagna's writing often reflects her Scottish background, sometimes being set in the country. An example of this is The Spark Gap, which she wrote specifically to include characters like the children she was teaching in Glasgow.

Other influences of her work include global warming and climate change, being major themes in her novel Exodus, which took the "highly commended" award, the equivalent of second prize, at the first Eco Prize, held by the Friends of the Earth Scotland. Her first novel for Young Picador, Exodus, was shortlisted for the Whitbread Award and was described by The Guardian as "a miracle of a novel".

Her book The Opposite of Chocolate deals with issues of teenage pregnancy.

== Notable works ==
Bertagna has written books for both children and young adults. Her first book was The Spark Gap. Her most recent book is Zenith, the sequel to Exodus. Both were written for young adults.

=== Major works ===
- The Spark Gap (1996) ISBN 978-0-330-44104-9 (publisher: MacMillan Children's Books)
- Exodus (2002) ISBN 978-0-8027-9826-8
- Zenith (2007) ISBN 978-0-330-43229-0
- Aurora (2011) ISBN 978-1-4472-0505-0 (publisher: Pan Macmillan)

=== Other works ===
- The Ice Cream Machine (Macmillan Children's, 1998) ISBN 978-0-330-43746-2
- Soundtrack (Pan Macmillan, 1999) ISBN 978-0-330-43634-2
- Bungee Hero (Barrington Stoke, 1999) ISBN 978-1-902260-23-5
- Dolphin Boy (Mammoth, 1999) ISBN 978-0-7497-3730-6
- Clumsy Clumps and the Baby Moon (Egmont Books, limited, 1999) ISBN 978-0-434-80209-8
- '"Amphibian City" (1999) (In Phenomenal Future Stories, edited by Tony Bradman)
- The Opposite of Chocolate (Young Picador, 2003) ISBN 978-0-330-41345-9
- Ice Cream Machine Totally Fizzbombed (Macmillan Children's, 2004) ISBN 978-0-330-43746-2

== Television series ==
In January 2004 a television series for children was created based on Bertagna's book The Ice Cream Machine. The programme was produced in a co-production of Five with SMG and the Gaelic Broadcasting Committee. It was aimed at six- to nine-year-olds and was to be broadcast in English and Gaelic.
