= Anna Perera =

British writer

- Born: Anna Perera; London, United Kingdom
- Occupation: Novelist
- Spouse(s): David Knopfler (divorced; 1 child)
- Website: Official Web

Anna Perera is a British writer.

== Life and work ==
Anna Perera was born in London to a Sri Lankan father and Irish mother. After teaching English at two schools in London, she took over a unit for adolescents who were excluded from school and later did an MA in Writing For Children at Winchester University. She lives in London and has an adult son.

In 2006, she attended a charity concert for Reprieve.org at the Globe Theatre, where she learned children had also been abducted and rendered to Guantánamo Bay. This event was the inspiration for the critically acclaimed novel, Guantanamo Boy, which has been translated into several languages and nominated for many awards, including shortlisting for the Costa Children's Book Award. Her latest novel, The Glass Collector, tells the story of 15-year-old Aaron and his life in the slums of present-day Cairo.

== Books ==
- Skew Whiff (1 March 2001) ISBN 978-01-9915-9673
- Lolly Woe (22 February 2001) ISBN 978-01-99193-806
- The Night the Lights Went Out (1 May 2006) ISBN 978-18-7051-6778
- Guantanamo Boy (5 February 2009) ISBN 978-84-666-4465-5
- The Glass Collector (8 February 2011) ISBN 978-08-0752-9485
- Antarctic Adventures ISBN 978-01-9919-6449

== Personal life ==
Anna married David Knopfler in March 1984. They have a grown-up son and divorced in 2010.
