= Fire World =

2011 novel by Chris d'Lacey

- Author: Chris d'Lacey
- Cover artist: Angelo Rinaldi
- Language: English
- Series: The Last Dragon Chronicles
- Subject: Dragons
- Genre: Fantasy novel
- Publisher: Orchard Books, an imprint of Scholastic Inc.
- Publication date: Hardback: 6 January 2011; Paperback: 1 September 2011
- Publication place: United Kingdom
- Pages: 562
- ISBN: 978-1408309582 (hardback); ISBN 978-1408309599 (softcover)
- Preceded by: Dark Fire
- Followed by: The Fire Ascending (5 April 2012)

Fire World is the sixth and penultimate novel in The Last Dragon Chronicles series by Chris d'Lacey. In an interview with ThirstforFiction on the publication day, d'Lacey stated that Fire World would be set in an alternate universe, and that all of the recurring characters from the previous novels would return, but in different guises.

== Plot ==
=== Part One ===
On the planet Co:pern:ica, Counsellor Strømberg (an auma counselor) talks with physics professor Harlan Merriman, his wife Eliza, and their son David about dreams that David has been having. On Co:pern:ica, people have commingled with Fain to make themselves higher beings, although there is a power called the Higher which governs those on Co:pern:ica.

In David's dream, he has been visited by firebirds and they have blown their special fire over him. It is later revealed that a temporal rift had opened up and the firebirds came to close it up. They come to the conclusion that someone, somewhere on another universe had been calling out to David.

Eliza and Harlan travel back to their pod where they decide to commingle their Fain and produce another child, a daughter for when David comes back. To be able to have a child on Co:pern:ica, they must be assessed by an agent of the Higher, called an Aunt. They are assigned to Aunt Gwyneth, with whom Eliza spent her childhood, and whom Harlan insults during the assessment. Gwyneth denies their request but says that Eliza could become an Aunt. She reluctantly agrees, and she is taken to the Dead Lands and begins to learn more about the world they live on.

Meanwhile, Harlan brings data from the research on David into his workplace, where he works with Bernard, and conducts research on the possibility of opening up controlled rifts that people can pass through like a teleport.

Strømberg suggests sending David to a huge Librarium, where he can be tutored by Charles Henry. At the Librarium, David meet a young girl called Rosa, who says that the Librarium is hers. David learns that to get around the Librarium, he must simply picture where he's going in his mind. David and Rose become friends while cataloguing the library for Mr Henry. While they are cataloguing they ask Mr Henry how to get to and above floor 43, because although they have searched for it they have never been able to reach it. Mr Henry says they must work hard to be able to access the secrets of the upper floors and it is revealed that there is a huge Firebird eyrie up there.

One day, Rosa's Firebird Runcey disappears, and a seemingly evil large red Firebird named Azkiar seems responsible. Rosa finds a book about Dragons, and fearing that Strømberg and Mr. Henry will take the book from her, she looks for a place to hide. Rosa manages to find the door to floor 43, but the door is locked and has no visible keyhole. Gwyneth appears, questions Rosa, and forbids her to read the book about Dragons. Then Gwyneth, who is visiting to check on David, demands to be taken to David and Mr Henry.

At first Gwyneth wants David to be destroyed but Strømberg steps in and says they should assess David as he is a very special eccentric.

Back in the Dead Lands, it begins to rain as Eliza finds clay and begins to model with it, eventually making an egg. The rain then becomes very strange as it is driving Eliza away, although when the drops fall on the ground they recreate images of dragons (long since died out on Co:pern:ica). Eliza finds them beautiful, though they scare her. Then the lead dragon, described as bony and almost human-like, breathes over Eliza, and she collapses.

Sometime later, a group of Firebirds find Eliza and they are trying to take care of her, when they discover the egg and wonder how one could have gotten out of the eyrie.

Two days later, Harlan, Bernard, and Strømberg are about to open up the rift. Meanwhile, Gwyneth finds a trail leading towards a cave, where she finds that Eliza has created many clay dragons acting almost as guardians to the area. Gwyneth furiously confronts Eliza about the heresy she has committed and Eliza shows that she has a baby daughter and cracked the family anomaly.

Back at the Librarium, a fire bird named Aurielle picks up the fire tear enclosed in one of David's own tears, a daisy chain that Rosa made for David earlier in the book, and the egg that Eliza created. Aurielle thinks about these things as she flies back to her perch and looks at a woven tapestry that she likes, called Isenfire, depicting the last scene of Dark Fire, where there are dragons, humans, the ix and darklings. Aurielle and the other fire birds know about the darklings, which they call "the shadows of ix". Meanwhile, another firebird comes along and warns them that a portal is opening somewhere and they need to be there.

Rosa and Henry and the whole of Co:pern:ica feel the rift opening. Rosa has read and re-read the book about dragons to David, after Strømberg over-ruled Aunt Gwyneth. Rosa manages to figure out how to read Dragontongue and believes she knows how to get up to the upper floors, just as Harlan switches on the machine. Suddenly Rosa passes out. When she wakes up, she finds David waking up as well. Both have aged about eight years.

=== Part Two ===
David and Rosa try to find out what has happened to the two of them and whether it is just the people inside the Librarium, or everyone, who experienced what Rosa calls a time quake. They visit the locked door, which opens when David successfully speaks a word in Dragontongue. On the other side, they find neatly ordered books which seem to parallel books in the real world (such as Alicia in the Land of Wonder, whose auma David communes with, and novels by Steven Kinge). They then see Azkiar sitting on a plaque labeled "fiction," and they run away, Rosa to go and find Mr. Henry. David is cornered by Azkiar, but Azkiar does not attack him and instead seems confused. David escapes and finds Rosa and a deceased Mr. Henry in Mr. Henry's office.

An aged Harlan arrives and shares that he started an experiment, which failed but caused everyone connected to age, which caused Mr. Henry's death. Knowing that he will be arrested, he gives David a micropen, which contains all the information that he needs. An aged Aunt Gwyneth and explains that she is taking Harlan away and that Eliza has called for David to be released and brought back, where she and his sister are waiting for him. Gwyneth explains that Rosa cannot go, because she can only leave the Librarium if she is called. Because her parents have died from the time quake, no one can call her. Gwyneth states that the Librarium is under the Aunts' control for now whilst they complete an evaluation and get a new curator. She summons two Aunts; Primrose and Petunia. Whilst David is walking away Rosa calls that if he does not stay with her, she will never let him come back. David promises that he will return.

Meanwhile, up on floor 108, Azkiar tells Aurielle that he has seen humans on the upper floors, specifically David and Rosa. The Firebirds have experienced the aging as well, and they discuss the incident. Aurielle tells him she must meditate on the matter and Azkiar, angry with her, flies up to the tapestry. Looking at it, he sees two humans and realizes that they are David and Rosa.

Back at pod 42, David is settling in with his mother and sister. Eliza warns David not to mention Harlan in front of her and tells David that Penny was born from an egg and that Eliza has brought clay back with her. Eliza says that she saw many things outside of the Great Design and that they were flawed like Boon. One of the dragons, the ugly one, guided her toward the cave. Eliza had taken the clay with her and that was how she had created an egg which she left outside the cave, and then a dragon came down and kindled it for her. When Gwyneth came back she destroyed all of the guardian dragons. Eliza only just managed to bring back a small bit of clay without Gwyneth noticing.

David goes to Harlan's study and finds his research computer wiped. Using the memory stick, he manages to find out what his father discovered, and also that Firebirds tried to close up the rift, but something else was coming through.

David is interrupted by Penny, who tells him that she has found a black Firebird feather, though both Eliza and David tell her that there are no black Firebirds. Later, as Penny is getting ready for bed, David reads Alicia in the Land of Wonder to her, imagineering the story with her so that the characters come to life. But something goes wrong and they see a mirror of another world (Liz's mirror in her bedroom) in it are clay dragons and a unicorn. Størmberg carries him to bed.

David wakes up two days later to find that Strømberg has gone and that he cannot stay in one place for too long, because he has gone into hiding. David tells his mother that to find the answers that he needs he either needs to go to the Dead Lands, which he knows she will not let him do, or go back to the Librarium. David prepares to go back to the Librarium when Penny walks in and tells him about the night he read to her. David begins to remember, and Penny shows David a picture that she drew of what the White Rabbit changed into. David knows that are no creatures like this on Co:pern:ica, and wonders how she could have gotten the detail so right for it.

Eliza tells David, before he goes that he needs to meet up with Strømberg on Bushley Common in the evening. When David asks which evening, she replies any, and that he will know how to find David. David goes to the common and plays with a katt whilst he waits for Strømberg to arrive.

Strømberg tells David that the society they are in is failing, and Aunts are plotting to overthrow the Higher and that the Higher resides in the Librarium. Strømberg and Mr Henry believed that the Higher operates through the firebirds. They talk some more and Strømberg is impressed that David and Rosa managed to get to the upper floors, whilst Stromberg and Mr Henry had tried for 20 years and failed. Before Strømberg leaves, he urgently tells David that he must go back to the Librarium and retrieve the Book of Agawin which he believes will tell the whole history of Co:pern:ica and of Dragons, and then contact him.

David tells Strømberg of the story telling, and that his adopted imagineered character turned into a black fire bird. Strømberg is confused, and then David tells him that when he slowed the video down of the experiment, he believes something came through and infected a normal fire bird and turned it black. Stromberg tells David that if this is true, then he must get to the Librarium that night, if possible and find the book.

As Strømberg walks off, David puts the katt down and walks off himself. The katt suddenly turns into Gwyneth, meaning that she has heard the whole conversation which was meant to be private.

Meanwhile, back in the Librarium, Rosa is not getting on well with the Aunts. They at first make her clean out a room for them and will not let her order any more books. This frustrates her greatly. One of the demands is the Rosa must block out the window and to do this she has to use books, which breaks her heart and the Librarium itself does not like it. After she has finished the task the Aunts come in and rip pages out of the books and stuff them in the gaps between them. This is too much for Rosa who leaves running. Rosa wants to return to floor 43 but does not dare because Gwyneth found her easily the previous time. Rosa finds herself missing Mr Henry. Whilst Rosa is asleep, deserted even by Runcey, the firebirds who are worried because they have not seen a fire bird since the time quake, including Runcey come down to examine her changes, and they conclude that the girl in the picture (Zanna) and Rosa do match, although Rosa does not have the Mark of Agawin (Oomera). Aurielle decides it is now time to consult the Higher about this situation and flies up over 100 floors to be able to speak to him.

Aurielle reaches the roof and thinks that it does not matter how many physical floors one must climb or fly, it is how determined they are and how much they need to get there. She flies onto a balcony and hears the Higher's voice speaking to her. Aurielle flies into the sensory matrix of the Higher known as the IS and speaks to him. The Higher calms Aurielle down and tells that what will be, will be, and that they allowed the science experiment to take place. The Higher also tells her that where there is order in the Eyrie, there is order in the rest of the world. Aurielle asks about the Isenfire, and the reply is that she always knew it was David, and she knows this is true. Aurielle now knows what to do. She must drive out the Aunts and bring David back so that he may be the new curator, and protect the Higher itself. The Higher tells her that Isenfire is upon them all. Finally, Aurielle tells the Higher about the egg that Eliza made, and the Higher replies, 'Beware of the thread.' When she asks what the thread is, the reply is, 'The thread is time and She will come from an egg.' Aurielle has one final question it is 'What is the Higher?', and the Higher tells her that it is pure Fain. The Higher tells her that she must become like a piece of bone that she found on the roof, and although she feels upset that her part is over, the Higher explains she will be an agent of the universe. Aurielle asks to see it, and she sees what fire birds will become. Not larger birds, not dragons, but they would have paws.

Rosa also does not like the situation she is in. The Librarium is despondent and desolate and the Aunts have locked themselves in their room with a big sign saying, 'KEEP OUT.' Rosa knows that she needs to find out what is going on and so comes up with a plan, after finding a book about mushrooms (because all Aunts like mushrooms), she makes a mushroom dish that is secretly drugged, and Rosa knocks on the door. 10 minutes later, Rosa gains entry to the room. There is a strange digi:pad on the floor, and she picks up a book reads the information. Then the pad scans the book and it tells her the books auma level. Flicking through the book, Rosa is furious and distraught to find that it has been wiped completely. Rosa tells the fire birds to tie up the Aunts and wait for them to wake up. When they have woken, Rosa gets one of the fire birds to torture Primrose's feet, knowing that they will both feel it as they are twins. Rosa questions the Aunts and finds out that the pad is an auma scanner, and that they have taken the auma from almost every book in the room. Rosa asks if it can be put back, but the energy can only be transferred and Gwyneth is the one who knows what she is going to do with it. They confirm that once the auma has been harnessed, the Aunts will attempt to take over Co:pern:ica.

The Aunts distract Rosa by imagineering David and thus enabling them to break free One Aunt manages to accidentally brand Rosa with the mark of Agawin. They then create a fire, which the three firebirds present cannot put out on their own and Aurielle tells Aleron to go and get the other fire birds who are already aware that the building is on fire. The Aunts manage to get the digipad by using their fain to catch it when Rosa throws it at the bed which is burning. When they switch it on it releases the auma into the room and there is nothing they can do and the Aunts run, the released auma travels into Rosa, through the mark of Agawin (or Oomara). On the window sill, Aubrey appears (the one who is the black fire bird) and the other fire birds are pleased to see her but puzzled as to her colour and the blood around her neck. More firebirds arrive and manage to put out the fire. Then suddenly, David climbs through the window to take control of the Librarium.

=== Part Three ===
Harlan and Bernard are being taken to the Dead Lands where they know their Fain will not work. The two of them wonder how they are going to survive once they have been dropped off. They watch the taxi disappear and then check their surroundings. They believe they can see lights in the distance and sure enough six people reach them holding lights. One of the men introduces themselves as Matthew LeFarr and explains that he was brought to the Dead Lands because he asked too many questions in the wrong places. The men give them clothes and they decide to travel to the Isle of Alavon where there is a settlement of twenty two people including Harlan and Bernard. Whilst they walk, Harlan and Matthew talk, and Harlan believes that if Matthew is not the leader of the group, then he should be, because he has leadership qualities.

After some time, they manage to reach a hill, and looking over it they see the Isle of Alavon. Matthew explains that this was where they believed Agawin used to reside. The group see a fire bird flying over head and many people race to catch it and Harlan goes with them to see what will happen. An old man, Roderic, is told to take Bernard back to the settlement. Bernard believes that the men are going to kill the fire bird. However, he manages to catch it when it flies to him, and Matthew tells him to put it onto the ground and turn its head away. The fire bird then cries its fire tear and a field of corn grows in its spot. Matthew congratulates Bernard, and says that the field will be called 'Bernard's field'. The whole party then goes back to the settlement where they settle in.

Harlan and Bernard know that life will be hard outside the controlled Central but believe they can get along. They learn that fire birds have brought them a great many gifts including cooking utensils and crops.

Matthew tells them that there will be a big meeting for everyone to get to know each other. After the meeting, Harlan asks about the tower up on the crest of Alavon and wants to journey up to it. Matthew agrees to take him and Bernard up to it, although warns that many of the tribes have gone mad since returning from the tower.

The journey is uneventful up until the point, near the crest, when Harlan is taken over and is told to be wary of the "shadow of the ix". Harlan is then thrown down and the rest of the party wonder what happened to him, as they help him into the building. Harlan tells them about what happened, and says that the dragons name was "Gawain" but they say they can not see "Gawain" so reviled – he is a wandering spirit. They move to the central dais where there is a carving of a winged man and they manage to get the creator to show itself, appearing as a talon (like the one in Fire Star, The Fire Eternal and Dark Fire).

The group then decide to come back down the hill to go back to the settlement, where Harlan tells everyone what happened up on the hill. He shows everyone the Creator, and then a darkling shows up and demands the Creator from Harlan, who at first denies it, but when he begins to fight it, Harlan drops it accidentally, and the darkling takes it off of him, and flies back to Co:pern:ica Central.

Harlan reveals that he wrote Isenfire on the sheet of paper that LeFarr gave him and believes that it is what brought the darkling upon them. The man who went up the hill with him is called "Colm Fellowes" and Harlan asks him how to destroy the Re:movers, and he tells him that it is water. Harlan then comes up with a plan to get everyone back to Co:pern:ica so that he can protect David, by turning the tower of Agawin into a massive beacon. Many of the group are sceptical and believe that the Re:movers will not come, but agree to go along with the plan anyway.

Meanwhile, the darkling travels back to Co:pern:ica and sees the fire in the Librarium. Landing on the window sill, the darkling prepares to take over Aurielle's body, but then gets seen and the fire birds question whether it is really Aubrey. The darkling flies up a few more floors to an abandoned level and prepares to wait another day before getting a new body. On this floor Gwyneth appears, she's still furious at Petunia and Primrose for their incompetence, sees the darkling then manages to capture it. She takes the Creator, and knows it is from a dragon. Gwyneth talks to the darkling and agrees to commingle with it. The Ix try to take over her body but Gwyneth just manages to break it up, warning the Ix that if it tries to do anything like that again, she will "destroy it piece by piece", and then the two of them share information. The Ix tells her that they are all part of something, and that three worlds are connected: Ki:mera, Co:pern:ica and a low plane world where Isenfier is taking place. Gwyneth asks what planet Isenfier world is called, and the answer is Earth.

=== Part Four ===
Gwyneth continues to interrogate the Ix while attempting to resist their attempts at a full control over her body (which she suppresses). The Ix share information about her concerning David Merriman. The Ix explain that David can alternate his auma through the three planes (Co:pern:ica, Ki:mera, and Earth). In basic words he lives an alternate reality on Earth different from on Co:pern:ica. In the conversation the Ix also explain to her about the power of the claw she took from the Ix, saying it acts as a creator that (as known from the previous novels) manipulates dark matter. It has the great power to bring upon whatever is written by the user. This proves true when Harlan managed to call upon the Black firebird possessed by the Ix by simply writing "Isenfier". The Ix also reveal that there are connections across the planes, one being a squirrel (presumably Conker from the previous Novels). The Ix then tell of Gwyneth being a connection as well to Gwilanna who died in the previous Novel before the Battle of Isenfier.

Shortly afterward Eliza and Penny come to visit David and Rosa in the Librarium. Gwyneth is then caged up by an imaginereed cage when she starts to act unruly to their presence. After they are introduced to each other Eliza pulls out a clay Dragon that has a pencil and a pad to show to them. They commingle to bring it to life. The dragon comes to life and starts to write something on his pad. Before he is finished though a time rift suddenly appears and the Ix within Gwyneth (still posing as a cat) come to attack and attempt to kill David. David defends himself by somehow transforming into a bear where he attacks and defeats the Ix colony and seals the rift.

After everyone settles themselves afterwards Aurielle (the cream-coloured firebird) upon seeing the Dragon on the table sees between it and the dragon that is on the Tapestry on floor 108 of the Librarium. Aurielle urgently tells David and Rosa to follow her with the clay Dragon to floor 108. Rosa is reluctant to bring David's sister Penny along with them but she ends up tagging along. This leaves Eliza with a very bitter Aunt Gwyneth to guard.

Having nothing else better to do Gwyneth starts up a conversation with Eliza. Gwyneth tries to convince her to look at the book that David was looking at on the way out of the room and at the same time try to convince her to release her from her cage. Eventually Eliza does look at the book David went to and reveals that David was trying to look up what the clay dragon was trying to spell before the Ix attacked him. It is revealed to be the dragon's name, Gadzooks.

Gwyneth also reveals that she is Eliza's mother. She explains to her that her Father was the almighty Agawin himself. However Gwyneth has no idea what has happened to him even up to when she was brought into Aunthood. During Aunthood Eliza was later discovered to be eccentric but her Aunt Su:perior took pity on her and decided to put Eliza into stasis until it was time for Gwyneth to claim her. But that unfortunately never came and Gwyneth realised she would not need a mother so she decided to have her introduced into Co:pern:ica as an orphaned child. She would be simply watched over by Gwyneth. This explains why Eliza could not recall her memories of childhood clearly when asked to by Aunt Gwyneth.

Gwyneth tries and tries to convince Eliza to free her. She also explains to her briefly about the Dragon claw found she found off of the Ix saying that she must go and claim it. She apparently hid it somehow without the Ix being aware. After a while she finally gets Eliza to open the cage and release her despite David's warnings not to listen to her.

Meanwhile, David and Rosa continue to climb up the floors of the Librarium making their way towards floor 108. Rosa sees the remains of the egg being guarded on the floor having already hatched. David is quick to try to get downstairs fearing for Penny and Eliza's safety from whatever hatched from the egg. However Rosa manages to convince David to stay on the floor long enough for them to find the tapestry on the large table in the room. David looks closely at the Dragon's notepad in the tapestry using a telescope. He finds on the notepad the three line mark of Oomara and a faint word written on it saying "sometimes". This is apparently referring to Gadzooks writing the word during the finale of Dark Fire when everyone disappears in the end.

They then turn their attention towards the book of Agawin which has somehow found its way to floor 108. David was sent by Strømberg to read the book cover to cover to find out more secrets, possibly pointing towards the Librarium. The book is apparently split into several sections: The Flight of Gideon, The Battle of Isenfier, The Isle of Alavon, and The Ark of Co:pern:ica.

David and Rosa decide to proceed to the lower floors. They are then separated when the Librarium starts to undergo a strange transformation. All the books and everything on all the floors of the Librarium start to transform into and become consumed by woodlands, trees and vines that start to warp their way around the entire Librarium. In the process Rosa encounters a white horse. Its name is Terafonne.

The reason for the transformation is revealed in the next chapter. While Rosa and David were up in floor 108 Penny is struggling to find the right book for herself down in floor 43 she catches a raindrop outside through the window while it is raining. The raindrop transforms into some sort of light and a girl younger than Penny appears and has wings. She calls herself Angel and it is obvious she is the parallel version of Alexa in Dark Fire. She offers to help her find a book and leads her to a point in the room and then disappears. The raindrop leads her to a shelf marked with the author that is David Rain from the previous books. There she pulls out his book Snigger and the Nutbeast, and when she opens it a squirrel jumps out of the book.

At that moment Gwyneth appears behind Alexa holding Eliza captive within the cage that David imagineered. At that point the transformation of the Librarium begins. Gwyneth explains to Penny that she triggered the transformation by opening the book. She says that the Librarium is actually the infamous Ark of Co:pern:ica that is referred to in the Book of Agawin. The Ark was created during the Great Re:duction that formed the dead lands to protect all of the animals and wildlife of Co:pern:ica. As Gwyneth rambles on about the Ark and animals in it, Penny takes the chance to attack Aunt Gwyneth and take the cage holding Eliza with her. However Gwyneth uses her powers to summon forth a wooden spike through the floorboards to drop Penny dead in her tracks. Eliza urges her daughter not to resist her to prevent further harm to her. At that moment Penny tells Gwyneth of the winged girl she saw moments ago named Angel.

Gwyneth is then introduced to Aurielle, Aleron, and Azkair, who have all transformed into small dragons. They attempt to burn Gwyneth with their fire but fail. The three of them cannot cause harm to the claw artefact that she holds and instead of harming Gwyneth they end up making her more powerful. She then uses the claw to knock back Azkair as he tries to attack her. Aurielle demands that Aleron keep Azkair put as she goes after Gwyneth, who has transformed herself into a Raven and has blended in with the flock circling the Ark that came with the influx of other animals that came into the Ark as a result of the transformation from the Librarium to the Ark.

As the pursuit between them escalates into the higher floors of the Ark, Gwyneth finds herself in the sensory matrix Is; the domain of the Higher. When she arrives she arrives in a very icy world that looks somewhat like the works of the Arctic. Gwyneth lands next to a polar bear and transforms back to herself. Next to the polar bear are Angel and Rosa, who is now riding Terafonne. The polar bear (apparently representing the Higher) says that all around her are flakes that are actually small fire stars. He encourages Gwyneth to take a fire star and join them. Angel apparently says she really wants Gwyneth to defect for them and to help them. However the Aunt has plans of her own. Her ambition to overthrow the Higher has completely suppressed any wishes for an Alliance with them.

She threatens to destroy the bear with the claw that she holds. Little does she now that any malevolent intent with the claw will immediately cause it to turn against her. The Higher warn her of this but again her ambition to overthrow the Higher overrules his negotiations. As Gwyneth is about to strike, the claw indeed turns against her and throws her off of IS into the ocean below. The ocean has formed as a result of the excessive raining that has caused a flood and then an ocean.

Harlan, Bernard, and Lefarr are victorious in their struggle with the Re:movers and have imagineered a boat to adapt to the changes going on around them. Harlan has also suffered injuries from the battle including the loss of an eye which is now covered by an eye patch. They pull Gwyneth from the water onto the deck of their boat (who is at the moment still alive). She wakes up coughing up water. Harlan who immediately recognises her demands they give her no help. However Lefar manages to convince him that even as bitter as she is she is still an Aunt and is to be respected. So with that they blanket her to keep her warm. In her dying breaths she says "My bo-dy is bro-ken but...nnn...my will...", revealing the fact she is indeed dying but has no intention of doing down in defeat just yet. With that she does something the shocks the three of them. She attempts to write something using the claw to try to save herself. As she writes Harlan becomes increasingly frustrated and takes a fishing hook and is about to impale Gwyneth with it when she is finally finished writing. In the end she wrote:

"I, Gwyneth also known as Gwilanna live..."

=== Part Five ===
Gwyneth is boarded onto the Ark and placed into a casket. Despite having written something with the claw that should have brought her back to life her body remains lifeless. The Merriman family is reunited and they all gather around the casket along with Lefarr and Bernard. It is then when Eliza reveals what she learned from Gwyneth, that Gwyneth is her mother. At that point Rosa walks in and is not pleased of seeing Gwyneth in the casket and demands that she be removed from the Ark. When she is told that Gwyneth may be still alive due to what she wrote on the boat with the claw before she died, Rosa proceeds to ensure her death by attempting to drive a wooden stake through her. David manages to stop her and Eliza explains that despite all the bad she has done she is still her mother and wishes for her body to stay on the Ark. Before leaving the area with Gwyneth's casket Harlan hands over the claw that he took from Gwyneth to David and tells David to meet him at the casket alone at some point to discuss a few things.

Later on Rosa pulls David aside and has a private conversation with him. She claims that the Tapestry up on floor 108 is gone. It has somehow vanished when the Librarium was slowly transforming into the Ark of Co:pern:ica.

Besides the loss of the Tapestry everything seems to be doing just fine in the Ark. Lefarr starts helping Bernard satisfy his curiosity about the bees that colonised after the Ark came to be and everything seems to be doing just fine.

Later on David goes to his meeting with Harlan. On his way he bumps into Angel who asks her to read her a part of the story Snigger and the nutbeast. He does so but before he can read more she gives him some sort of talisman ( possibly similar to the one that transforms into Groyne in the previous novels ) and then says she has to go. He thanks her for giving him the talisman and proceeds to meet with Harlan for their scheduled private meeting at Gwilanna's casket.

It is also revealed ( if not know earlier in the novel ) that David and Rosa are the parents of Angel. She hatched from the egg in floor 108 guarded by the firebirds when they found it in the dead lands. It apparently fused with the chain of daisies that Rosa made for David before the time rift from Harlan's experiment and the tear that David shed when he saw the wounded Runcey.

David arrives at the floor of the ark where his father Harlan is waiting for him. They take a moment to examine Gwyneth's body and to discuss the strangeness of her state. Harlan and David both agree it is strange that when Gwyneth wrote what she wrote on the ship that she is still in this condition. If the claw's purpose served true it would have brought Gwyneth back to life. They debate that this could possibly be because she might not have had her intent in check when she wrote so that's why it may not have worked. Then David proposes that due to the time nexus it has somehow delayed the effects.

Later on after the scheduled meeting at Gwyneth's body at some point Harlan and David meet on the outside deck. At this point the large ship that is the Ark is setting coarse towards land. It is here when in great detail Harlan explains to David of the Battle in the Dead Lands between him, Bernard, Lefarr and the rest of his tribe against the Re:movers. They were victorious as Harlan explains his story, however Abbot Hugo had to sacrifice himself when a Re:mover sunken in the marshes of the battlefield stuck its hand out in front of Harlan holding a bomb. Hugo protected Harlan by throwing himself onto the bomb to save Harlan's life. He also explained that he was burned in the eye by a scanner from one of the Re:movers which explains his eye wound. Angel then appears at Harlan's side. She tells Harlan that Hugo is very happy and cries, making his wounded eye heal.

Rosa returns after riding Terafonne to some distant land. The Ark then stops at the Dead Lands where all the animals inside are released. David and Rosa have a conversation with her afterwards primarily concerning the future of the Ark. David proposed that they should have the help of the Direbird to distribute books to all the people of Co:pern:ica (especially those uses boats to get close to the work of wonder). Rosa refuses to simply give away all the books. However David explains it would not be so. Instead of keeping the books, they would return them for a new one.

Rosa then accepts and within days the Firebirds are distributing books to numerous citizens of Co:pern:ica having many return with notes form those who borrowed them that requests new books.

Many in their boats land them where the Ark itself also landed. They all then proceed to be shown to the Isle of Alavon. Lefarr intends to leave, but David asks him to stay. He then calls his father Harlan aside and reveals his secret that he has yet to tell him: that Lefarr is in the tapestry in floor 108. Harlan manages to get Lefarr to stay.

The distribution and return of books from the Ark continues. One day Rosa is busy cataloguing them when Lefarr delivers a note to her: a proposition of marriage. Rosa turns him down because of David.

Later on, Strømberg makes an entrance into the Ark. Strømberg shares that at first he says that people thought that the Higher was angry and that the Ark was a symbol of their anger. However, later on they find out that it is actually a gift from the Higher for people to understand and co-exist more with the wildlife brought by the Ark.

Eventually everyone in the Ark gather around a table on the deck where David intends to discuss and explain more about things that circle around the Tapestry on floor 108. Since the Tapestry has still yet to be recovered, David uses his memory to imagineer a duplicate of the Tapestry to show to everyone. Once shown the replicate of the tapestry, Lefarr asks why they are in the Tapestry. Harlan, as a physicist, explains that present, past, and future are all united into one "now", and that there are actually parallel dimensions out there with people who are the same as them but live different lifestyles in a completely different plane of existence.

David explains that the tapestry depicts a battle that he thinks was actually frozen in time. The dragon Gadzooks, who is also in tapestry with his pencil and pad, writes "sometimes" with his pencil and notepad. David says that Gadzooks basically froze the battle in a critical point when it apparently seemed to be swinging in the favour of the Ix. This explains why in the previous book everyone disappeared in battle near the end. After that, Gadzooks sent a distress beacon to other worlds as a request for help. The beacon apparently resonated with David in Co:pern:ica, and David's abnormal sleeping patterns in the beginning of the book were really a response to the Ix tracking the beacon to Co:pern:ica and trying to get in via David.

David also explains that there is a possibility that the Ix had a bigger ambition than to control the time nexus that they would use to unfreeze the battle. He explains that he believes that he is actually destined to go to the aid of those in the battle depicted in the tapestry and that is most likely why the Ix want him dead.

Harlan then brings up an interesting point: Gwyneth actually wrote the name Gwilanna when writing herself back to life using the claw. The question is then raised of how Gwyneth would have known her name on the other world. They then figure out that the Ix actually gave her that information earlier while both were sharing information.

As the conversation continues Rosa shows up with two Firebirds, who have finally recovered the Tapestry. To the shock of everyone on the Ark, the Tapestry is different to the one that David imagineered: Gwyneth has appeared on the real Tapestry.

They realize that when Gwyneth wrote "I, Gwyneth, also known as Gwilanna, live..." on the boat, she never intended to come back to life in Co:pern:ica. Instead when she wrote herself to life, she ended up surrendering herself to the time nexus and realigned it in the process. Since she referred to the name given to her parallel self on Earth, she was resurrected on Earth. If Gwyneth remained dead in the events of the Tapestry (which was the final battle in Dark Fire) the events of the Tapestry would be true. However, this is not the case. Since she has brought herself back to life on Earth she has done so during the events of the Tapestry. David and Harlan reveal that this could completely change the events of the Tapestry if she were to be present while they occurred.

Suddenly, Aurielle gets snagged in the Tapestry and as she starts to struggle to move she starts to pull at the thread on the Tapestry slowly unravelling it. This then causes the picture of Gwyneth (and a strange boy) to appear on the Tapestry and David to slowly move towards the Shadow of the Ix. At the very end of the book the water around the Ark turns to fire.

== Characters ==
=== The Merrimans ===
David Merriman

The parallel world version of David Rain. At the beginning of the book, he is a patient at the auma clinic because he is an eccentric, which means he does not follow the great creation and can use his imagineering to imagineer things different from the Great Design. David later becomes the Curator of the Librarium after Mr Henry dies. David captures Gwyneth and speaks to her eventually and Gwyneth dies. Whilst coming back down, David finds the Isenfire tapestry has changed and Gwyneth/Gwilanna has survived and is on Scuffenbury Hill, smiling.

Eliza Merriman

The parallel world version of Elizabeth Pennykettle. Early on in the book, Eliza is chosen to become an Aunt by Gwyneth. She cracks her family anomaly and has the daughter without the help of an Aunt. After David leaves to return to the library she promises to keep reading Alicia in the Land of Wonder to Penny, stating that it will be less trouble and scary. She gets told by Gwyneth that Gwyneth is her mother and that she had all memories of her removed before reinstating her into the world. Eliza joins up with the family in the ark on the way to the Dead Lands.

Penny Merriman

The parallel world version of Lucy Pennykettle. Penny was born from an egg, much the same way the Pennykettle women are born in the other world. Penny is the same age as Lucy in the first few Dragon Chronicle books, but her Fain has not developed properly because of the time quake. Penny is inquisitive like Lucy and it is she who changes the Librarium into the ark.

Harlan Merriman

The parallel world version of Arthur Merriman. Harlan is a physicist, working at the Ragnar Institute for Physics. He is concerned for his son and to make sure his son has a normal life, experiments on temporal rifts unauthorised and is taken away to the Dead Lands. There he joins up with the Follows of Agawin and becomes friends with Matthew LeFarr. When they travel to the tower of Avalon Harlan gets given the Creator, but loses it to the ix later in the book, where he learns they are targeting his son David. Harlan asks a member of the group who used to service the robotic Re:movers how to destroy and attack a Re:mover, and the reply is water. He manages to escape from the Dead Lands with LeFarr and rejoins his family upon the ark.

=== Allies ===
Rosanna ('Rosa')

The parallel world version of Suzanna 'Zanna' Martindale. She is an orphan on this world, because her parents had supposedly "hidden her away" because her Fain was limited and would stunt others from being able to flow. Rosa's parents volunteered to head for the Dead Lands. It is revealed that she has no Fain. Rosa hates it when the Aunts move in and hatches a plan to remove the Librarium by torturing them.

Angel

The parallel world version of Alexa Martindale, found out when she calls David 'Daddy'

Thorren Strømberg

The parallel world version of Anders Bergstrom. He again is a lot like his other world self although he does not appear to have the ability to be able to change himself into a bear. After the failed experiment, Strømberg knows that he will be wanted and will eventually be re:moved, goes into hiding. He shows up from time to time to help David, especially during the failed story telling and wants David to find the book of Agawin. Strømberg shows up on the ark and looks at the tapestry of Isenfire.

Mr. "Charles" Henry

The parallel world version of Henry Bacon. Mr. Henry is the curator of the Librarium. In this universe he is quite good tempered and does not mind young children. He helps out Rosa and David in the Librarium although even he did not know its full secrets. After the time quake, Rosa and David find him dead in his office and it is later shown that he died of natural causes instead of ageing.

Bernard Brotherton

The parallel world version of Brother Bernard. Before he is Re:moved from Co:pern:ica central, Bernard was a technichan working for Harlan. He helps out with the science experiment that goes wrong. Bernard is one of the few to escape the Dead Lands and hears Gwyneth's last words.

Mathew Lefarr

The parallel world version of Tam Farrell. He is described as being a natural leader. When he lived in Co:pern:ica central he worked with designing maps, and by asking too many questions in the wrong places, stumbled across things he should not have. LeFarr eventually breaks into a building controlled by the Aunts and this gets him removed to near the Isle of Avalon. When Harlan plans to destroy a Re:mover, Lefarr offers to be the bait as he knows the marshes the best and is the youngest and fittest of the group. After rejoining on the ark, Lefarr finds himself for Rosa and is going to leave the ark for the Dead Lands when David tells him to stay and LeFarr sees his parallel self in the tapestry.

=== Aunts ===
Aunt Gwyneth

The parallel world version of Gwilanna. She is a lot like Gwilanna in the other parallel world, evil and always working toward the same goal, although she has a superior motive when she persuades Eliza to become an Aunt and is actually known as an Aunt Superior. She has many secrets and seems to know many things about Co:pern:ica that others do not. Gwyneth manages to catch the darkling that Harlan encounters and takes the Creator off of it and agrees to commingle with it. Gwyneth dies after flying up to the top of the Librarium and falling after speaking to David. She tells Bernard some words, saying that she will live on. Nobody knows what this means, but David tells everyone not to worry. After finding the tapestry of Isenfier they find that the timeline has changed and that Gwyneth/Gwilanna is now on Scuffenbury hill waving goodbye to everyone.

Aunt Agnes

This is the Aunt that granted them to have David, and the Merrimans originally request her, but she is busy with another client.

Aunt Primrose and Aunt Petunia

They enter the book when Aunt Gwyneth commands them to stay at the Librarium to keep watch over Rosa when David leaves. They are strict, and they command Rosa to block up a window with books. When the books refuse, the two Aunts rips out their pages and stuff them in the gaps. They never let Rosa in their office, and when Rosa puts a drug in a mushroom dish to make them sleep, Rosa finds that they are draining the auma of books.

=== Mystical Beings ===
Gadzooks

Gadzooks ('Zookie') is David's powerful writing dragon. His power is that he can write the future on his notepad. However, Gadzooks is only mentioned as a minor character, and does not use his powers. Eliza makes it for David out of clay, like when Liz makes it for David on Earth. In Fire World, Gadzooks is made reading a book instead of a notepad and pencil. This could be a reference to the first book in the series, when Liz Pennykettle tells David that she "tried him with a book, but he definitely wanted a pencil to chew on."

Boon

The parallel world version of Bonnington. David created Boon purposefully flawed with part of one ear missing like Bonnington in the Pennykettle world. David teases him a lot when he returns home from the Librarium and Eliza often reprimands him.

Terafonne

Terafonne is the parallel version of the mystical unicorn 'Teramelle' from Scuffenbury Hill in Dark Fire. Rosa is seen riding her around the Ark.

Agawin

A mystical winged creature who once lived on the Isle of Alavon. He is said to know everything about dragons and the tapestry of Isenfire. He is briefly seen when Harlan Merriman and Mathew Lefarr find the Crea:tor in the abandoned tower.

Firebirds

Firebirds are very mysterious creatures. Many Co:pern:icans have wanted to have one as a pet and they are generally regarded as a very high being/creature. They have a large eyrie up in the Librarium near the Isenfire tapestry. There are a few main Firebirds, such as Runcey, which is Rosa's almost pet meaning he follows her and helps her out. However, the name 'Runcey' is just a nickname; the green Firebird's real name is Aleron. The other two main firebirds are the red Firebird Askiar and the cream Firebird Aurielle, who is the leader of the eyrie.

Katts

Katts are the other type of creature that inhabit Co:pern:ica and they are a lot like domestic Earth cats. There is one exception to their design and this is when David creates a flawed Katt named Boon.

Gawain

Harlan encounters Gawain when heading to The Isle of Avalon, but nobody in the tribe was able to see Gawain.

== Places ==
Bushley

Bushley is a town on Co:pern:ica, which is meant to be the parallel world version of Scrubbley, in the previous books. The book mentions it has a park, which Strømberg and David go to. The Merrimans' house is: Pod 24, Crescent Way – which is similar to the Pennykettles' house: 42, Wayward Crescent.

The Dead Lands

The Dead Lands are barren wastelands, outside of modern civilisation. Aunt Gwyneth sends Eliza there to 'train' to become an Aunt. Also, it is where Eliza discovers clay and shape an egg and many small dragons out of it. She is surprised when they come to life and when Penny hatches from the egg. The Dead Lands could be the parallel world of Farlowe Island.

The Librarium

The Librarium (also referred to as Bushley Librarium) is a huge building, with an uncountable number of floors, which we are led to believe is meant to be like the Great Alexandrian Library of Ancient Greece. It has millions of books housed inside, although not all of the ordered. The Librarium is a very strange place. To be able to move around people must use their fain to get to the right place. There are many places unexplored, past floor 42. It is later revealed that the Higher lives up on roof, inside the dome and can be entered through the dome into its sensory nexus. The Higher spawns all the auma for the entire Co:pern:ica, and the Aunts want to overthrow it, so that they can rule Co:pern:ica without having to abide to its rules. In the last part of the book, Penny takes a book from a shelf (Snigger and the Nutbeast), and this causes the Librarium to change, as rain begins to fall outside. The Librarium is revealed to be an ark, and houses all of the animals of Co:pern:ica and are being taken to the Dead Lands.
