= Exodus (Bertagna novel) =

2002 novel by Julie Bertagna

- First edition
- Author: Julie Bertagna
- Publisher: Picador
- Publication date: August 2002
- Media type: Paperback
- Pages: 336
- ISBN: 978-0-330-39908-1
- OCLC: 51964816
- Followed by: Zenith

Exodus is a young adult science fiction novel written by Julie Bertagna, published in August 2002. The story is set on an island faced with the problem of a rising sea level, caused by melting ice caps and other forms of global warming. Mara must think of a way to save herself, the other villagers and, most importantly, the world. The book was short-listed for the Whitbread Children's Book of the Year in 2002. Exodus is part of a trilogy; the sequel to the book is Zenith, published in 2007, followed by Aurora, published in 2011.

Julie Bertagna was inspired to write this book in 1999, when she learned of two South Pacific Islands being engulfed by the sea as a result of global warming, forcing the people to find higher land. Bertagna started to investigate into the topic of global warming and the stories inspired her to write Exodus and its sequel Zenith. The purpose of the book is to inform young readers about global warming and convince them that something must be done about it.

== Plot summary ==
In the year 2100, 15-year-old Mara lives on the island of Wing, with fellow villagers. The melting ice cap has caused the shoreline to rise and they are now almost out of land. Through her cyberwizz, a laptop-like gadget, she navigates through information to find where they can go. She meets a mysterious creature called Fox, who demands to know where she is. Mara is excited because beyond him she can see a new world, but she loses connection before she can learn more. Mara tells the villagers about New Mungo, a place where they can go which is a new land raised high above sea level. They eventually leave in fishing boats, but are forced to leave behind the elder generation who couldn't part from their home.

Once they reach New Mungo, they realise it is actually not a welcoming place; a huge outer wall surrounds the whole sky-city. They then are forced to join a refugee boat camp and some of them die there, including Mara's best friend Gail. The Sky Police, from New Mungo, occasionally take the strong up to the city in a procedure called Pickings, but Mara has a bad feeling about this. Mara learns all her family drowned in the perilous journey to New Mungo, and attempts to commit suicide. When she realises her will to live is too strong, Mara manages, with the help of an urchin she names Wing (after her drowned island), to enter the city gates. There she meets the people of the Netherworld (a strange twilight place in the shadow of the sky city, with the roofs of the drowned city of Glasgow jutting above the sea), who are known as the treenesters. They immediately recognise her as their messiah, the Face in the Stone, from an old prophecy called the Stone Telling. She lives with them for some time, exploring and helping them to survive.

One day, while she is with her friend Gorbals (a tree-nester) in the forbidden university, Gorbals and Wing are taken by the Sky Police, along with many sea urchins (a wild breed of children without language, but hairy bodies and webbed hands) and the sea urchins are slaughtered by the Sky Police. Determined to save her friends, she takes the uniform of a police woman that the police accidentally killed in the massacre and sneaks up to the city. She is overwhelmed by its superficial beauty and shallow entertainments. At first, she needed some help with searching. Doll, a computer worker, helps her with the computers. While searching through the Noos, a virtual, evolved version of the World Wide Web, she meets Fox. She discovers it is David, the quiet, hard-working grandson of Caledon, creator of the Sky City and the one who allowed many people to drown if they couldn't pass an intelligence test to allow them entrance to the new world.

Together, they organise an escape plan that involves David crashing the Noos with a 20th-century virus, allowing Mara to free the slaves and then leave the city unnoticed. The only catch is that David would not be able to leave with Mara, with whom he has fallen in love, because he must stay to begin a rebellion against the unfair New World. While executing her plan, Mara fatally stabs Tony Rex, a man she believes is a spy, with an ancient bone dagger, and then rescues Gorbals, Wing and all the people chosen in the Pickings, who have become slaves. They slide down air vents into the Netherworld and board a supply ship. They break free of the city walls, also saving the people in the refugee boat camp and the Netherworld. The boats are programmed to Greenland, a place that is thought to have risen high above the water like a cork. Fox also slides down the air vents, to begin his rebellion outside the reach of his grandfather. The book finishes with Mara wondering how far people will go to save themselves, and if Caledon was right to save a special few. The book ends with the hope that the refugees will reach safety in Greenland.

A screenplay for this book is currently under way. The movie adaptation of Exodus is not yet scheduled for release.
