= Louise Cooper (fantasy writer) =

British writer

Louise Cooper (29 May 1952 – 21 October 2009) was a British fantasy writer who lived in Cornwall with her husband, Cas Sandall.

Cooper was born in Barnet, Hertfordshire. She began writing stories when she was at school to entertain her friends. She continued to write and her first full-length novel was published at the age of twenty. She moved to London in 1975 and worked in publishing before becoming a full-time writer in 1977. She became a prolific writer of fantasy, renowned for her bestselling Time Master trilogy. She published more than eighty fantasy and supernatural novels, both for adults and children.

Cooper gained a great deal of writing inspiration from the coast and scenery, and her other interests included music, folklore, cooking, gardening and "messing about on the beach". She was treasurer of her local Lifeboat station; she and her husband both sang with the shanty group Falmouth Shout.

Cooper died aged 57 of a brain haemorrhage on 21 October 2009. Her husband survives her.

== Bibliography ==
- The Book of Paradox (1973)
- Walburga's Eve (1981)
- Journey's End (1981)
- Crown of Horn (1981)
- The Blacksmith (1982)
- Dangerous Desire (1982)
- Sea Song (1982)
- The Rose of Jaipur (1983)
- Mirage (1987)
- The Thorn Key (1988)
- The Sleep of Stone (1991)
- Firespell (1996) (republished under the title Heart of Fire in 1998)
- The Hounds of Winter (1996) (republished under the title Heart of Ice in 1998)
- Blood Dance (1996) (republished under the title Heart of Stone in 1998)
- The Shrouded Mirror (1996) (republished under the title Heart of Glass in 1998)
- The King's Demon (1996)
- Sacrament of Night (1997)
- Heart of Dust (1998)
- Storm Ghost (1998)
- Our Lady of the Snow (1998)
- The Summer Witch (1999)
- The Spiral Garden (2000) (short stories)
- Short and Scary! (2002) (short stories)
- Demon Crossing (2002)
- Doctor Who: Rip Tide (2003)
- Hunter's Moon (2003)
- Butch the Cat-Dog (2003)
- Pebbleboy (2004)
- The Lost Boy (2005)
- Merrow (2005)
- Short and Spooky! (2005) (short stories)
- Terror in the Tower (2005)

=== Series ===
==== Blood Summer ====
1. Blood Summer (1976)
2. In Memory of Sarah Bailey (1976)

==== Time Master universe ====
- Lord of No Time (which was later reworked into the Time Master trilogy) (1977)
- Time Master trilogy (1986):
1. The Initiate
2. The Outcast
3. The Master
- Chaos Gate trilogy (sequel to the Time Master trilogy):
1. The Deceiver (1991)
2. The Pretender (1992)
3. The Avenger (1992)
- Star Shadow trilogy (prequel to the Time Master trilogy):
1. Star Ascendant (1994)
2. Eclipse (1994)
3. Moonset (1995)
- Daughter of Storms trilogy (Time Master spin-off):
1. Daughter of Storms (1996)
2. The Dark Caller (1997)
3. Keepers of Light (1998)

==== Indigo series ====
1. Nemesis (1989)
2. Inferno (1989)
3. Infanta (1990)
4. Nocturne (1990)
5. Troika (1991)
6. Avatar (1992)
7. Revenant (1993)
8. Aisling (1994)

==== Creatures series ====
1. Once I Caught A Fish Alive (1998)
2. If You Go Down to the Woods (1998)
3. See How They Run (1998)
4. Who's been Sitting in My Chair? (1999)
5. Atishoo! Atishoo! All Fall Down! (1999)
6. Give a Dog a Bone (1999)
7. Daddy's Gone a-Hunting (2000)
8. Incy Wincy Spider (2000)
9. Here Comes a Candle (2000)
- Creatures at Christmas (1999) (short stories)

==== Mirror Mirror trilogy ====
1. Breaking Through (2000)
2. Running Free (2000)
3. Testing Limits (2001)

==== Sea Horses quartet ====
1. Sea Horses (2003)
2. The Talisman (2004)
3. Gathering Storm (2004)
4. The Last Secret (2005)

==== Mermaid Curse quartet ====
1. The Silver Dolphin
2. The Black Pearl
3. The Rainbow Pool
4. The Golden Circlet
