= Sue Mayfield =

British author

Sue Mayfield (born 1963 in England) is a writer of fiction for children and young adults. Many of her works are about young people overcoming difficulties and the themes that are in her works are loss, friendship, and forgiveness. Previously a teacher, Mayfield has been regularly visiting several schools since 1990 to read her works and lead writing workshops and has also taught creative writing to adults. She facilitates others peoples' writing in healthcare settings and has worked in doctor's surgeries, hospitals, and museums.

== Awards ==
Mayfield won the Heartland Award for Excellence in Young Adult Literature, in 2005 for Drowning Anna. Her novel Blue was nominated for the Carnegie Medal and sold over 15,000 copies.

== Bibliography ==
=== Young adult fiction ===
- Damage (2006)
- Poisoned (2004)
- Voices (2003)
- Reckless (2002)
- Blue (2001)
- Patterns in the Sand (2004)
- On Eagles' Wings (2004)

=== Children's fiction ===
- Shoot! (2003)
- The Four Franks (2006)
- Molly Muddle's Cake (2004)
- Our Wonderful World! (2004)
- Drowning Anna (2005)
- Texto à la mer (2007)

=== Spirituality ===
- Life Attitudes
- Life Balance
- Youth Emmaus
