= Looking for JJ =

Young adult novel by Anne Cassidy

- Similar to first edition (publ. Scholastic Books)
- Author: Anne Cassidy
- Publication date: February 13, 2004
- Award: Booktrust Teenage Prize (2004)

Looking for JJ is a young adult novel by British author Anne Cassidy, first published in 2004. It is about a teenage girl who was convicted of murder as a child. The novel was shortlisted for the Carnegie Medal and the Whitbread Book Award and was the winner of the 2004 Booktrust Teenage Prize.

== Plot introduction ==
The book centers on Alice Tully, a 16-year-old waitress who is living in Croydon. She has a boyfriend called Frankie and lives with a probation officer called Rosie who, apart from Jill Newton, her counsellor and Pat Coffey, her social worker, is the only one close to her that knows about her secret. She killed her friend, Michelle, when she was 10 years old, as Jennifer Jones, and had been released from jail six months earlier than sentenced. The book follows certain parts of the story such as Alice now, Jennifer and the killing, and her new identity when the press expose her at the end of the book. Alice says she is very interested in the Jennifer Jones case, only to reveal to Frankie and her friends that she is actually the killer herself. She says she did not mean to kill Michelle, though she hit her on the head with a bat.

There are four sections in the book: the first is about Alice Tully's discovery to the newspaper articles and the urge of media to know more about Jennifer, the second of Jennifer Jones herself (going into details of her childhood, showing how her mother abandoned her and the buildup to the crime), the third of Alice Tully (as her identity is revealed) and the last of Kate Rickman (Jennifer's new identity).

== Adaptations ==
The Pilot Theatre performed an adaptation of the novel between autumn 2007 and spring 2008. The play won the TMA Award for best show for children and young people.

== Sequel ==
A sequel, Finding Jennifer Jones, was published in 2014. It was ultimately successful though didn't reach as high acclaim as the initial novel.

== Translations ==
- Dutch: Zoeken naar JJ. Translated by Yvonne Kloosterman. Tielt: Lannoo. 2006. ISBN 9789085682820.
- French: L'Affaire Jennifer Jones, lit. 'The Jennifer Jones Affair'. Translated by Nathalie M. C. Laverroux. Toulouse: Milan. 2006. ISBN 9782745918864.
- Lithuanian: Ieškant Džei Džei. Translated by Kazimiera Kazijevaitė. Kaunas: Gimtasis žodis. 2006. ISBN 9789955161233.
- Polish: Gdzie jest Jennifer?, lit. 'Where is Jennifer?'. Translated by Marta Ostrowska. Warsaw: Wydawnictwo STENTOR. 2007. ISBN 9788389315946.
- Turkish: JJ Kim?, lit. 'JJ Who?'. Translated by Nazlı Tancı. Istanbul: ON8. 2012. ISBN 9786054603015.

== See also ==
- Mary Bell: a real-life case which partly inspired the novel
