= The Fire Eternal =

2007 novel by Chris d'Lacey

- First image
- Author: Chris D'Lacey
- Language: English
- Series: The Last Dragon Chronicles
- Genre: Fantasy novel
- Publisher: Orchard Books, an imprint of Scholastic Press
- Publication date: September 2007(UK), July 2008(US)
- Publication place: United Kingdom
- Media type: Print (hardback)
- Pages: 506 pp
- Preceded by: Fire Star
- Followed by: Dark Fire

The Fire Eternal is a 2007 novel by English author, Chris d'Lacey. It is the fourth book in his series The Last Dragon Chronicles. After writing The Fire Eternal, d'Lacey has written Dark Fire, Fire World, and The Fire Ascending.

== Plot summary ==
In the Arctic: Slowly the ice is changing; bears are starving; dragons are rising; and the souls of the Inuit dead are haunting the skies. The spirit Gaia, goddess of the Earth, is restless, aching to bring her might down upon these changes. But all living things may suffer if she does. As the weather grows wilder and the ice caps melt, all eyes turn from the north to David's daughter, Alexa. She is the key to stopping it . . .But can one girl save the world from the forces of evil or will she disappear like her father?

The book opens with a short chapter about how the Earth, Gaia, is beginning to get restless, and then goes to explain Zanna's sadness about David being gone. She gives the invisible and shapeless dragon G'lant, which David gave to her at the end of Fire Star, to her daughter Alexa. Since David's apparent death, Zanna has been trying to get back on her feet. She bought a New Age shop called the Healing Touch and is living with the Pennykettles in David's old room. While Zanna is at her shop one night, Lucy sneaks into her room, and steals a letter that Zanna wrote to David. Every year on Valentine's Day, the day that David died, Zanna writes a letter to David telling him all of the events that are going on in the house. When Lucy reads the letter, she feels the need to do something to tell the world that David is not dead. So she writes an E-mail to a man named Tam Farell, whose role is not yet revealed, telling him to go the Healing Touch and ask for Zanna.

As the book goes on, every few chapters, the author puts in a chapter telling the reader what is happening in the Arctic. The Ice Bear, Ingavar, is with his two followers, a fighting bear called Kailar, and a Teller of ways called Avrel. They go and meet Thoran, who is really Dr. Bergstorm, and he tells Ingavar that his time on the ice is up. So Ingavar consumes Thoran with icefire, and his spirit is passed on to Ingavar. Meanwhile, in Zanna's shop, Tam Farell comes in and tells Zanna that he is having a pain in his neck. Using her methods she tells him that his pain should be in his liver, not his neck. He says that was a test to check her skill. Zanna is rather charmed, amused, and annoyed by him, and his remark and moodily schedules a consultation for them. As Tam is leaving, he invites her to a poetry reading at a bookshop, and tells her to bring her partner. Later that day, Zanna, Liz, and Lucy go shopping at the garden store, and find a 'fairy door' for Alexa to play with, and Lucy sends a fateful message to Tam telling him what Zanna's scars are. She writes only one word: Oomara. In the Arctic, Ingavar remembers how Avrel and he first met. Having disguised himself as a fox, he tricked Avrel into following him, and then filled his head with old knowledge and legends. As Avrel and Ingavar walked on, they saw the souls of countless Inuit men in the sky.

Zanna decides to go to the poetry reading, and discovers that Tam is a poet himself. Tam decides to buy David's book, White Fire, and Zanna gets slightly suspicious. So Zanna investigates and soon finds out that Tam Farrell is a journalist. Zanna brands Tam with Oomara and erases the memory of that day including meeting Lucy. Before Tam passes out he mouths one word – Parents – at Lucy and she knows she needs to find David's parents. Later she packs her stuff and goes to the place Tam works. She instructs Gwendolen to give Tam some of her memories (she still has them.) Gwendolen does as she is instructed and Tam's memory comes back. Lucy asks Tam to travel with her to Blackburn. When they get to where David lived there is no house, and the neighbours claim that there was never a house there. Then Zanna gets in her car and phones Liz. Lucy's phone gives out a ray of violet and projects an image of a squirrel. Lucy chases it right through a portal. Zanna tells Liz she is going after her and Liz tells her that she may never see Alexa again. Then Alexa is on the phone and tells Zanna that she saw David being a polar bear in her toy's eye. Just as Zanna walks towards the portal, Tam jumps in and the portal closes.

Gwilanna comes to the Arctic and an image of a mammoth appears. Ingavar tells that it's his daughter's toy and turns into David, then sends Gwilanna, but before he does his eyes turn to scalene eyes. Lucy finds herself on Farlowe island and brother Bernard appears and leads her to a room. Tam follows but before she enters she notices Bernard's eyes are black. Back home at the Crescent, Alexa is putting icefire on David's four dragons and they enter the portal in the fairy door. Liz goes in and Gwillanna, stuck in the form of a raven, talks to Alexa. At Farlowe, Lucy is forced to create a Darkling but it has a flaw – it has no heart. The Ix (the flip side of the fain that killed David) there are upset that the Darkling had an extra piece which looks like a knife and is the heart. So, the Ix invade Lucy. Lucy goes home and her mother greets her, but Lucy cuts her with the heart-knife and knocks Liz out. Gwillian sees and cries his fire tear, which is later recovered. Gwilanna goes to Zanna and tells her that they need her help. Zanna turns into a raven and flies back. As Zanna arrives, the Ix exit Lucy and Zanna turns back saying a spell to pull all of the flower petals and onto the Ix. Alexa walks out and sees the Ix as Bonnington lowers his vibration and destroys the Ix. The Ix dies and Gwilanna saves Liz, revealing that Liz is pregnant. That night Zanna and Alexa go out to the library gardens and Alexa runs up the path and jumps into a man's arms. The man is David.

== Characters ==
=== Humans/Hybrids ===
Elizabeth Pennykettle (Liz) – The landlady and the maker of the mysterious clay dragons. She is pregnant with a boy, Joseph Henry, Arthur's child. She is a hybrid. She happens to be a descendant of a legendary yet mythical woman named Guinevere, who was very close to Gawain, the last dragon on earth. Guinevere caught his fire tear and with it formed the Arctic since his tear was never properly returned to the Earth, Gawain turned to stone instead of returning to the Earth.

Lucy Pennykettle – Liz's daughter, now 16, firmly believes that David is not dead and will return to save the Arctic. As a result of her grief combined with her teenage years, Lucy is easily aggravated and hostile. She has one dragon, Gwendolen. She is another hybrid (descendant of Guinevere).

David Rain – Zanna's partner and boyfriend, whom she misses dearly. David was Liz's tenant and a college student in the previous books, but at the end of Fire Star he disappeared in the North Pole and the question of "is he dead?" was unanswered. David features in The Fire Eternal, but his character is now much different it is found out that David is actually a Fain, a trans-dimensional being, obtained Gawain's fire tear, joined spirits with polar bear Ingavar, and can shapeshift. During the book, he has taken up answering questions about what he was, with Bergstrom's answer: "Sometimes". Questions are raised about his own origins: who are his parents? David was shown the dragons in previous books but was still always unsure of that world, yet in The Fire Eternal, he has become much more knowledgeable. Oddly, it appears that David simply "materialized" existing, at age 20. In dark fire, it is revealed that this was due to Arthur writing about him using the legendary claw of Gawain. The claw was sent to him by Alexa in her pre-born state as a fain because David should have been born to Liz and Arthur. The fain had been planning David's Birth for centuries, and it was disrupted when Gwilanna set them apart.

Suzanna Martindale (Zanna) – Zanna is a Goth who fell in love with David at college and knows a great deal about dragons and other mythical creatures. She is a descendant of Gwendolen, a powerful sibyl, and is a sibyl herself. She lives with Liz, Lucy, and Arthur, and is the mother of Alexa, David's child. She has a dragon, Gretel, and owns a shop in this book, called The Healing Touch.

Alexa (Lexie) Rain – The daughter of David and Zanna. She is five years old, a bright and intelligent child, yet shows strange awareness and abilities, possibly because of being born to a powerful sibyl and David's mysterious new form. She is the only one who can see G'lant [or at least seemingly] and draws pictures of him. She also seems aware of David's presence in the Arctic. There is more to Alexa then is let on in "The Fire Eternal."

Gwilanna – An ancient sibyl, is a hybrid of half Fain half-human. She wants the tear for herself so she can resurrect the dragons. Helps David, the Pennykettles, and the Martindales more in this book than ever before and seems more human. Mysteriously disappears into the Scottish islands. Her mother is a sibyl and her father is a combination of Ix (an evil type of Fain), man, and darkling.

Arthur – A man who loves Liz greatly. Up until recently has spent his life as a monk and gaining some special powers of his own, such as he can see through Bonnington's eyes by "commingling". He is almost completely blind due to his body being invaded by an alien life form but is nevertheless a genius. He teaches physics at Scrubbley University and knows much of the workings of the world. He lives with Liz and is married to her.

Tam Farrell – A reporter for The National Endeavor. He was doing a report on David Rain, believing that he did not exist and that someone else took his name. At the end of this book, he was captured and invaded by the Ix (an evil offshoot of the Fain) but successfully escaped. Near the end of the book, he seems to have gained the power of a Teller and is driven with the motive of protecting the Pennykettles and the Martindales. His eyes change from blue to brown.

=== Dragons and animals ===
Gawain – The last natural dragon in the world, last seen crumbling and falling into the Arctic Ocean. His eye has been retrieved by the sea goddess Sedna. The ice in the Arctic is his fire tear. He shed his fire tear and was the last dragon until humans came.

Gwendolen – Lucy's special dragon, skilled with modern technology, especially computers. She uses her tail to connect with them (possibly a USBplug). Has also shown to be successful at inserting memories into someone, as shown when she did this to Tam Farrell to restore his memory.

G'reth – David's wishing dragon can and has travelled through space and time, and commingled with a Fain. He was made in the book Icefire, and is the first dragon made by Lucy Pennykettle.

Gretel – The potions dragon. She belongs to Zanna. Gretel used to belong to Gwilanna, who is feared yet respected by the other dragons. Refers herself as the most powerful of the Pennykettle dragons. She has the ability to create potions from flowers.

Gadzooks – David's special writing dragon, who used to help him get inspiration for his books, but has now been inactive for 5 years with David gone. He misses his master very intensely.

Gruffen – A guard dragon. When danger is imminent he swells to three times his size. He is used at the Healing Touch after it is opened and does not stay at Wayward Crescent.

Gollygosh (Golly)Golightly – David's natural healing dragon, made by David himself. He does not only heal living things but he can also fix modern appliances and other things. Golly was made in the book Fire Star while Lucy was captured by Gwilanna. He was David's very first dragon he made.

Gwillan – A puffer dragon (he does household duties). He likes collecting the post. A special dragon of Liz's, to whom she is very close. Sadly at the end of the book he sheds his fire tear. David has been seen holding Gwillan in his hands, telling Liz that he will help him.

Groyne – A mysterious dragon that used to belong to Dr. Bergstrom, given to him by an Inuk shaman. He has since affiliated himself to David. When in the form of a piece of narwhal tusk, a talisman only he can form due to his ability of materialisation; He can "dematerialize" and "materialize" (similar to teleporting) and shape shift; even to the point of invisibility.

Grace – Sophie's (David's ex-girlfriend) listening dragon. Temporarily had her ears snapped off (by David when he was pretending to be under the spell of one of Gretel's potions) in the book Icefire.

Ganzfeld – A listening dragon made by Liz. It rests on top of the fridge and its name is mentioned in the last book of the series, The Fire Ascending.

Bonnington – The Pennykettle's family cat, who fell ill with tongue cancer in Fire Star – possibly a result of drinking dragon's fire. He now has the ability to transform into any other feline form [preferably his panther form], after a Fain became trapped in him. Often commingles with Arthur to enable Arthur to see through his eyes. In The Fire Eternal he transformed into a tiger almost hurting Liz very badly.

G’lant – Zanna's Valentine dragon, given to Zanna by David as a goodbye present, but has another mysterious purpose. G'lant is invisible to all except Alexa.

Gauge – A time-telling dragon. He moves his paws to represent the hands of a clock.

Ghislaine- She is a dragon whom Gwillana's mother was to be illuminated to. However, Gwillana's mother was killed before this happened.

Darkling – An anti-dragon made from obsidian. Its heart is made from dark fire instead of icefire like the Pennykettle dragons are made from, or white fire like natural dragons are made from. It is shaped more like a gargoyle than a dragon.

Avrel – A polar bear, descendant of the Teller of Ways, Lorel who was one of the original nine bears who ruled the ice. He assists Ingavar (commingled version of David Rain) in search of the eye of Gawain. He has currently become a part of Tam Farrell.

Kailar – A polar bear, descendant of the fighting bear Ragnar. Aids Ingavar in the search for the eye of Gawain. He too has become a part of Tam Farrell.

Sedna – The sea goddess who had her fingers chopped off by her father. She retrieves the eye of Gawain for David in exchange for fingers. The fingers were her father's. David said there are eight fingers, four of which are good fingers from her father's hand which she kissed, and four fingers that are evil which were used to sever her own fingers in the myth. Avrel pushed the fingers into the water, and told Sedna that the fingers that she kissed will be lighter and the ones to land on the bottom of the sea last.

‘’'Raven Man'’’ – Sedna's husband, who betrayed her father. He was killed by Avrel
