= Fire Star (novel) =

2005 novel by Chris D'Lacey

- Fire Star
- Author: Chris D'Lacey
- Language: English
- Series: The Last Dragon Chronicles
- Genre: Fantasy novel
- Publisher: Scholastic Press
- Publication date: 7 September 2005
- Publication place: United Kingdom
- Media type: Print (Paperback), (Hardback)
- Pages: 548 pp
- ISBN: 1-84362-522-9
- OCLC: 62152419
- Preceded by: Icefire
- Followed by: The Fire Eternal

Fire Star is a 2005 novel by English author Chris D'Lacey. It is the sequel to his 2003 novel Icefire, and is followed by The Fire Eternal, which came out in September 2007.

== Plot summary ==
Tension is rising at the Pennykettles as Lucy is suddenly kidnapped by a long-forgotten rival. This 'rival' wishes to raise the ancient dragon Gawain from his stone-laden resting place. Over time Lucy is there, she goes through extreme changes. Gwilanna knew this would happen as Lucy began to look like Guinevere, her ancestor.

After a sudden bear attack and the news about Lucy, David returns home to help Liz overcome this rough time. In the middle of a serious conversation with Liz, David receives a heartbreaking phone call. He has just learned Zanna, his girlfriend, has just been taken by bears. Under all this pressure, David breaks down. Liz soothes him in dragonsong, the ancient soothing method Guinevere used on the ancient dragon Gawain.

While David is home, Grockle suddenly awakens to find the window opened. Curious as he was, he flies out of the window. Nobody could prevent it, even David.

Meanwhile, Lucy is not having a good time at all. She decides to explore the cave of Gawain when Gwilanna leaves one day. She pushes around the cave and discovers a secret hideaway she thinks her ancestor, Gwendolen, used. Eventually, she falls asleep by the bones of Gwendolen and a bear that guarded her. An old female bear ventures into the cave to hibernate, down into the hideaway, and decides to follow the dead bear's example, and guards Lucy as she sleeps. Gwilanna returns and finds the hole and notices Lucy and the female bear and decides tiredly, to leave them be.

David gets Liz to tell her who Arthur is after Gadzooks gave him the name out of nowhere. After hearing the cruel things Gwilanna did to break-up Arthur and Liz, he travels to Farlowe Island to find Arthur.

Arthur lives on a religious island, having chosen the name Brother Vincent, where he came after attempting suicide. He goes through a lot on the island. In fact, he survives a vicious attack by Ix, an evil Fain.

David arrives at the island and calms down the scared yet vicious Grockle, who had been imprisoned by the monks. Grockle flies to the Arctic when David tells him to. After a while of introductions and explanations, Arthur teaches David how to use Dr. Bergstrom's mysterious talisman to teleport from place to place.

The Ix arrives in the Arctic and freezes Gwilanna into a block of ice. He also possesses Ingavar, using his ancestor's tooth to destroy the island along with Gawain. Grockle, angered by the destruction of his father, and empowered by his ancestor's claw, uses his new fire to melt Ingavar down to less than ash. Zanna, who had earlier arrived with the bears, instructs Grockle to enter the fire star and he is instantly transported to the world of the Fain, saving his life.

David teleports to the Arctic just then and battles the very same Ix to the death. The Ix stabs two spears of ice through David's chest, but David won't die because the ice is really Gawain's fire tear. After revealing the secret of the ice to the Ix, the spirit of Ingavar punches the Ix out of the body of Tootega, the Inuit whose body the Fain had possessed, killing Tootega, and the Ix. Zanna, in tears, comes running over to David. After assuring her they'd meet once more and giving her a Valentine's Day gift, (a new dragon, G'lant, which you can only see if you really believe in dragons) he parts from Zanna. Some polar bears take David's body on a piece of ice, Ingavar's spirit lays down by his head and the polar bears pound the ice and send David and Ingavar into the water.

Back at home, they release Snigger back into the wild after being kidnapped by Gwilanna.

== Reception ==
While referring to the novel as "an entertaining adventure" with intriguing side plots, Kirkus Reviews found the characters to be "flat and stereotyped". Further, they stated that "the mixed ages of the protagonists [...] lead[s] to some inconsistency of style, but the originality of the approach makes up for shortcomings in implementation".
