= Manchester Book Award =

British project

The Manchester Book Award is a project run in Manchester, UK, organised by School Services at the Manchester Library & Information Service; it is funded by the Working Neighbourhoods Fund. The project is currently in its fourth year.

Each year, a longlist of twenty-four children's books is drawn up from nominations by secondary-school pupils, school and library staff, and publishers. To be eligible for the longlist books have to be standalone books (that is, not sequels) published between 1 July and 30 June, written by authors living in the UK. Reading groups in schools and libraries then narrow this to a shortlist of six. In the following January, young people across Manchester start voting for their favourite, either online or in libraries and schools; voting for the 2009 award closed on 5 March.

The winner of the award is announced each year at a ceremony at the City of Manchester Stadium attended by pupils from the 24 state secondary schools in Manchester. The ceremony was compered in 2008 and 2009 by Paul Sleem.

The 2009 award was announced by Coronation Street actress, Julie Hesmondhalgh, on 11 March 2009.

== List of Prize Winners ==
- 2009 Six Steps to a Girl by Sophie McKenzie
- 2008 Girl, Missing by Sophie McKenzie
- 2007 Beast by Ally Kennen
- 2006 Stuff by Jeremy Strong

== Winners, shortlists, and longlists ==
The following is a listing of all honoured books, including winners, shortlists, and longlists.

Manchester Book Award honorees
Year	Author	Title	Result	Ref.
2006	Jeremy Strong	Stuff	Winner	
2006	Joe Craig	Jimmy Coates: Killer	Shortlist	
2006	Joseph Delaney	The Spook's Apprentice	Shortlist	
2006	Catherine MacPhail	Roxy's Baby	Shortlist	
2006	Michelle Paver	Wolf Brother	Shortlist	
2006	Benjamin Zephaniah	Gangsta Rap	Shortlist	
2006	L. J. Adlington	The Diary of Pelly-D	Longlist	
2006	Bernard Ashley	Ten Days to Zero	Longlist	
2006	Sherry Ashworth	Paralysed	Longlist	
2006	Theresa Breslin	Divided City	Longlist	
2006	Kevin Brooks	Bloodline	Longlist	
2006	Kevin Brooks	Candy	Longlist	
2006	Cathy Cassidy	Indigo Blue	Longlist	
2006	Frank Cottrell Boyce	Millions	Longlist	
2006	Catherine Forde	Skarrs	Longlist	
2006	Keith Gray	The Fearful	Longlist	
2006	Julie Hearn	The Merrybegot	Longlist	
2006	Charlie Higson	SilverFin	Longlist	
2006	Brian Keaney	Jacob's Ladder	Longlist	
2006	Michael Morpurgo	The Amazing Story of Adolphus Tips	Longlist	
2006	Alex Shearer	The Hunted	Longlist	
2006	Justin Somper	Vampirates: Demons of the Ocean	Longlist	
2006	Robert Swindells	Branded	Longlist	
2006	Karen Wallace	The Unrivalled Spangles	Longlist	
2007	Ally Kennen	Beast	Winner	
2007	Helen Dunmore	Ingo	Shortlist	
2007	Catherine Forde	The Drowning Pond	Shortlist	
2007	Alan Gibbons	Hold On	Shortlist	
2007	Nigel Hinton	Until Proven Guilty	Shortlist	
2007	Nicky Singer	The Innocent's Story	Shortlist	
2007	David Almond	Clay	Longlist	
2007	Bernard Ashley	Smokescreen	Longlist	
2007	Melvin Burgess	Sara's Face	Longlist	
2007	Cathy Cassidy	Scarlett	Longlist	
2007	Stephen Cole	Thieves Like Us	Longlist	
2007	Frank Cottrell Boyce	Framed	Longlist	
2007	David Cunningham	Cloud World	Longlist	
2007	Julia Golding	The Diamond of Drury Lane	Longlist	
2007	Meg Harper	Fur	Longlist	
2007	Anthony Horowitz	Raven's Gate	Longlist	
2007	Paul Magrs	Exchange	Longlist	
2007	Christine Morton-Shaw	The Riddles of Epsilon	Longlist	
2007	William Nicholson	Seeker	Longlist	
2007	Mal Peet	Tamar	Longlist	
2007	Marcus Sedgwick	The Foreshadowing	Longlist	
2007	Alex Shearer	Tins	Longlist	
2007	Sarah Singleton	Heretic	Longlist	
2007	Matthew Skelton	Endymion Spring	Longlist	
2008	Sophie McKenzie	Girl, Missing	Winner	
2008	Kevin Brooks	Being	Shortlist	
2008	David Gilman	The Devil's Breath: Danger Zone	Shortlist	
2008	Graham Joyce	Do The Creepy Thing	Shortlist	
2008	Ally Kennen	Berserk	Shortlist	
2008	Catherine MacPhail	Nemesis	Shortlist	
2008	Tom Becker	Darkside	Longlist	
2008	Julia Bell	Dirty Work	Longlist	
2008	N. M. Browne	The Spellgrinder's Apprentice	Longlist	
2008	Cathy Cassidy	Sundae Girl	Longlist	
2008	Philip Caveney	Sebastian Darke	Longlist	
2008	Sharon Dogar	Waves	Longlist	
2008	Catherine Forde	Tug of War	Longlist	
2008	Robin Lloyd Jones	Red Fox Running	Longlist	
2008	Rhiannon Lassiter	Roundabout	Longlist	
2008	James Lovegrove	Kill Swap	Longlist	
2008	Paul Magrs	Twin Freaks	Longlist	
2008	Cliff McNish	Angel	Longlist	
2008	Philip Reeve	Here Lies Arthur	Longlist	
2008	Nigel Richardson	The Rope Ladder	Longlist	
2008	Malcolm Rose	Kiss of Death	Longlist	
2008	Marcus Sedgwick	My Swordhand is Singing	Longlist	
2008	Jenny Valentine	Finding Violet Park	Longlist	
2008	K. Wild	Fight Game	Longlist	
2009	Sophie McKenzie	Six Steps to a Girl	Winner	
2009	Anne Cassidy	Forget Me Not	Shortlist	
2009	J. A. Henderson	Crash	Shortlist	
2009	Eva Ibbotson	The Dragonfly Pool	Shortlist	
2009	Sally Nicholls	Ways to Live Forever	Shortlist	
2009	Sarah Singleton	The Amethyst Child	Shortlist	
2009	Bernard Ashley	Angel Boy	Longlist	
2009	Cathy Cassidy	Lucky Star	Longlist	
2009	Frank Cottrell Boyce	Cosmic	Longlist	
2009	Berlie Doherty	Abela	Longlist	
2009	Siobhan Dowd	Bog Child	Longlist	
2009	Catherine Forde	Sugarcoated	Longlist	
2009	Julia Golding	Dragonfly	Longlist	
2009	Keith Gray	Ghosting	Longlist	
2009	Nick Hornby	Slam	Longlist	
2009	Elizabeth Laird	Lost Riders	Longlist	
2009	Rhiannon Lassiter	Bad Blood	Longlist	
2009	Kate Le Vann	Rain	Longlist	
2009	Anthony McGowan	The Knife That Killed Me	Longlist	
2009	Michael Morpurgo	Born to Run	Longlist	
2009	Patrick Ness	The Knife of Never Letting Go	Longlist	
2009	Chris Priestley	Uncle Montague's Tales of Terror	Longlist	
2009	E. E. Richardson	Grave Dirt	Longlist	
2009	Jenny Valentine	Broken Soup	Longlist	
