= Bolton Children's Book Award =

Annual literary award

The Bolton Children's Book Award is an annual award given to works of children's literature published in paperback during the previous year. The award is sponsored by Bolton Literacy Trust, The University of Bolton and Page Nation.

== Honorees ==
Bolton Children's Book Award winners and shortlists
Year	Author	Title	Result	Ref.
2005	Robert Muchamore	CHERUB: The Recruit	Winner	
2005	Cathy Cassidy	Dizzy	Shortlist	
2005	Frank Cottrell-Boyce	Millions	Shortlist	
2005	Chris d'Lacey	Horace	Shortlist	
2005	Alan Gibbons	The Defender	Shortlist	
2005	Catherine MacPhail	Underworld	Shortlist	
2005	Alex Shearer	The Lost	Shortlist	
2005	Angela Woolfe	Avril Crump	Shortlist	
2006	Joe Craig	Jimmy Coates: Killer	Winner	
2006	Louise Arnold	Invisible Friend	Shortlist	
2006	Thomas Bloor	Worm in the Blood	Shortlist	
2006	Cathy Cassidy	Indigo Blue	Shortlist	
2006	Alan MacDonald	Sign of the Angel	Shortlist	
2006	Justin Somper	Vampirates: Demons of the Ocean	Shortlist	
2006	Jeremy Strong	Stuff	Shortlist	
2007	Sophie McKenzie	Girl, Missing	Winner	
2007	Elly Brewer	Jerry and the Jannans	Shortlist	
2007	Michael Coleman	The Howling Tower	Shortlist	
2007	Ally Kennen	Beast	Shortlist	
2007	Catherine MacPhail	Nemesis	Shortlist	
2007	Malcolm Rose	Kiss of Death	Shortlist	
2007	Chris Ryan	Flash Flood	Shortlist	
2007	Ali Sparkes	The Shapeshifter: Finding the Fox	Shortlist	
2008	Derek Landy	Skulduggery Pleasant	Winner	
2008	Colin Bateman	Titanic 2020	Shortlist	
2008	Will Gatti	The Geek, the Greek and the Pimpernel	Shortlist	
2008	Nick Green	The Cat Kin	Shortlist	
2008	F.E. Higgins	The Black Book of Secrets	Shortlist	
2008	Jill Huckles	Deeper than Blue	Shortlist	
2008	Jenny Valentine	Finding Violet Park	Shortlist	
2008	Cat Weatherill	Wild Magic	Shortlist	
2009	Sally Nicholls	Ways to Live Forever	Winner	
2009	Chris Bradford	Young Samurai: The Way of the Warrior	Shortlist	
2009	Philip Caveney	The Eye of the Serpent	Shortlist	
2009	Zizou Corder	Boy Thief	Shortlist	
2009	Berlie Doherty	A Beautiful Place for a Murder	Shortlist	
2009	Kit Downes	Zal and Zara and the Great Race of Azamed	Shortlist	
2009	JA Henderson	Crash	Shortlist	
2010	Narinder Dhami	Bang, Bang, You're Dead!	Winner	
2010	Alison Allen-Gray	Lifegame	Shortlist	
2010	Vanessa Curtis	Zelah Green, Queen of Clean	Shortlist	
2010	Tanya Landman	Mondays are Murder	Shortlist	
2010	Rebecca Promitzer	The Pickle King	Shortlist	
2010	E.E. Richardson	The Soul Trade	Shortlist	
2010	Malcolm Rose	Forbidden Island	Shortlist	
2010	Di Toft	Wolven	Shortlist	
2011	Steve Voake	Fightback	Winner	
2011	John Connolly	The Gates	Shortlist	
2011	Sam Enthoven	Crawlers	Shortlist	
2011	Ally Kennen	Sparks	Shortlist	
2011	Tamsyn Murry	My So Called Haunting	Shortlist	
2011	Jenny Valentine	The Double Life of Cassiel Roadnight	Shortlist	
