= Jimmy Coates =

Children's book series by Joe Craig

- Jimmy Coates: Killer; Jimmy Coates: Target; Jimmy Coates: Revenge; Jimmy Coates: Sabotage; Jimmy Coates: Survival; Jimmy Coates: Power; Jimmy Coates: Blackout; Jimmy Coates: Genesis (TBA)
- Author: Joe Craig
- Country: United Kingdom
- Genre: Thriller, Children's
- Publisher: HarperCollins
- Media type: Print (Paperback)

Jimmy Coates is a series of children's books written by the English author Joe Craig. The books have been published in many countries and became widely available in the United States for the first time in 2013.

The books are mostly set in the fictional dictatorship of the "Neo-Democratic State of Great Britain".

== Series ==
Number	Title	Publisher	Date Published (UK)	ISBN
1	Jimmy Coates: Killer (USA: Jimmy Coates: Assassin?)	HarperCollins Children's Books	March 2005	ISBN 0-00-719685-7
2	Jimmy Coates: Target	HarperCollins Children's Books	May 2006	ISBN 0-00-719686-5
3	Jimmy Coates: Revenge	HarperCollins Children's Books	January 2007	ISBN 0-00-723285-3
4	Jimmy Coates: Sabotage	HarperCollins Children's Books	October 2007	ISBN 0-00-723286-1
5	Jimmy Coates: Survival	HarperCollins Children's Books	April 2008	ISBN 0-00-727099-2
6	Jimmy Coates: Power	HarperCollins Children's Books	October 2008	ISBN 978-0007277308
7	Jimmy Coates: Blackout	HarperCollins Children's Books	June 2013	ISBN 978-0007524327
8	Jimmy Coates: Genesis	HarperCollins Children's Books	TBA	

== Characters ==
=== Protagonists ===
- Jimmy Coates – a young, genetically modified assassin
- Zafi Sauvage – another young, genetically modified assassin (who works for the French secret intelligence)
- Mitchell Glenthorne – another young, genetically modified assassin (who works for NJ7)
- Helen Coates – Jimmy's mother
- Eva Doren – Georgie's friend who works in NJ7, but she is actually giving information to Jimmy about NJ7's plans
- Georgie Coates – Jimmy's half-sister
- Felix Muzebeke – Jimmy's best friend
- Dr. Higgins – scientist who helped to create Jimmy
- Christopher Viggo – campaigner and politician
- Saffron – trained in the martial arts and Christopher Viggo's girlfriend

=== Antagonists ===
- NJ7 – the fictitious government agency that pursues, and designed, Jimmy Coates
- Miss Bennett – Director of NJ7
- Paduk – ex Director of Special Security for the Neo-Democratic State of Great Britain
- William Lee – Director of Special Security for the Neo-Democratic State of Great Britain
- Ian Coates – Jimmy's father and, later, Prime Minister of Great Britain
- Ares Hollingdale – the late and former Prime Minister of Great Britain
- Dr. Higgins – part of the team that built Jimmy & Mitchell
- Lieutenant Commander Luke Love
- Mitchell Glenthorne – the first assassin created
- Zafi Sauvage – the French child assassin
- Uno Stovorsky – French Secret Service
- Colonel Keays – a director with the CIA and Synperco

== USA release ==
Shortly after the UK publication, Craig's first book was released in the United States under the title Jimmy Coates: Assassin but withdrawn shortly afterwards. During its short release, it was selected for, among others, the Lone Star reading list in Texas and the New York Public Libraries 'Books for the Teen Age' list.

The whole series was released for the first time in the USA across 2014 and 2015 by Open Road Media.

== Critical reception ==
The Independent wrote of the first book: "Few books have the power to drag young boys away from their Xbox or Wii but I've seen the Jimmy Coates series in action – Super Mario is no match for this schoolboy assassin."

It was described by School Library Association as "Packed full of shocks and surprises, high-octane action sequences, constant dangers and near-miss escapes from death, this is an at-a-sitting read for Bond and Rider fans everywhere. With bags of film potential..."

It was a finalist for the 2006 Manchester Book Award, and won the Bolton Children's Book Award 2006.

== See also ==
- CHERUB
- Alex Rider
- Young Bond
- Spy High
- Henderson's Boys
- Spy School
- Theodore Boone: Kid Lawyer
