= Blood Ties (McKenzie novel) =

2008 book by Sophie McKenzie

- Author: Sophie McKenzie
- Published: 7 July 2008 (Simon & Schuster Children's)
- Media type: Print (Paperback)
- Pages: 448
- Awards: Lancashire Book of the Year (2010)
- ISBN: 978-1-84738-275-7
- OCLC: 225446359
- Followed by: Blood Ransom

Blood Ties is a 2008 young adult thriller science fiction novel by British writer Sophie McKenzie.

== Plot ==
=== Part 1: London ===
Theodore "Theo" Glassman is frustrated with his bodyguard, Roy, who is escorting him everywhere. When Theo accuses his mother of imagining a threat (which is why he has a bodyguard), Mrs. Glassman reluctantly agrees to tell him who is threatening his life. Meanwhile, Rachel Smith is annoyed with her parents for constantly comparing her to her dead sister, Rebecca, who was a star student and daughter. When Rachel receives on her phone a weird text message from her father, Richard, that says, "Goddess still safe in Heaven. Richard", she asks him about it and Richard tells her that he was supposed to send the message to somebody else, but refused to tell her anything further. Back in Theo's house, Mrs. Glassman reveals to him that his father, James Lawson, whom she had previously told her son was dead, is actually alive and in hiding from a highly extremist group called RAGE (Righteous Army Against Genetic Engineering). With the information he received from his mother, Theo searches for his father on the internet with the help of his best friend, Jake. He comes across an article that says that years ago, RAGE carried out a bombing of a genetic research clinic, which is where Theo's father worked. The article also mentions Elijah Lazio, 'the Gene Genie' and Richard Smith, who was at the birth of his daughter when he saw the bombing from the hospital window. Theo decides to find Richard's daughter to see if he can get any information from her father about his own father. He and Jake are able to work out how old she is and which school she goes to. As Rachel leaves school the next day, she meets up with Theo, who goes on to tell her that his father may have worked with her father and that he would like to see if Richard knew anything about James Lawson. Rachel agrees, so they both go to her house, where he asks Richard about the bombing of the research clinic. He looks terrified and denies it. Later, Theo gives Rachel his number and tells her to contact him if she gets more details. Later on, Theo contacts his hacker friend, Max, who says that she is happy to help if needed. At school, Rachel is confronted by the school bullies, Jemima, Phoebe and Amy, who demand to know what relation she has to Theo. Rachel lies by saying that he's her boyfriend. Jemima says that if Theo is really her boyfriend, then she expects to see him at the school dance as Rachel's date. Later on, Theo rings Rachel, asking her if she can get hold of her dad's laptop. The plan is to get Max to hack into her dad's email account and see if he sent any interesting emails lately. Rachel quickly takes the laptop and hides it in a backpack before heading off to Max's house. When she gets there, she gives Max her dad's laptop. Max hacks into Richard's laptop and discovers an email sent to Rachel's dad from a man called Lewis. The email talks about a business trip to Germany. Theo suspects that his father could be there. He plans to go to Germany and find out. Rachel says that she will come with him as her dad is involved. They arrange to meet up at Rachel's school disco and leave together. On the night of the disco, Theo and Rachel ran into each other and began dancing. Jemima comes up to Theo and asks him why he's here with Rachel. At that moment, something seemed to snap inside Rachel as she began tugging on the neckline of Jemima's extremely low shirt. She screams and everyone gathers around to see what's going on. Rachel pulls Theo away, saying that she had to make a diversion. As they sneak out through a side door and start walking towards the train station, they are suddenly attacked by two men in masks and dark clothing. One man catches Rachel and the other aims a gun at Theo's forehead. Just as Theo braces himself for death, the other man punches the man holding the gun and knocks him out. The man introduces himself as Lewis and admits that he works for Theo's dad and that Rachel's dad is in touch with him. Theo's dad sent Lewis on a mission to rescue Theo, so Lewis started working undercover in the RAGE group in order to find out more about their plans. Lewis added that the weird text message Rachel received from her dad is in fact a code message to confirm that she is safe, as the RAGE people are also looking for her. Lewis then bundles them both into a car, heading off to meet James Lawson.

=== Part 2: Scotland ===
Two hours later, Theo, Rachel and Lewis arrive at their destination. They are offered beds for the night by Lewis' girlfriend and colleague, Mel. The next day, Theo is introduced to Elijah Lazio 'the Gene Genie', which turns out to be his father. Elijah explains that James Lawson is in fact his new identity, since he was hiding from the RAGE group and that Theo is a clone of him and Rachel is a clone of her dead sister, Rebecca. Theo feels upset that his mother didn't tell him the whole truth, while Elijah does his best to comfort him, but later shows his true colours when he abducts Theo along with Mel and ties them up on a plane bound for America.

=== Part 3: Washington D.C ===
After spending a couple of months at Elijah's house in D.C, Lewis and Rachel arrive to rescue Theo and Mel. RAGE attack Elijah who kidnaps Theo, Rachel and a younger clone of himself, Daniel and holds them hostage. It is revealed that Elijah is in need of a heart transplant and intends to use Theo's heart because of him being a complete genetic match.

Realizing they have to escape Theo, who is locked in his room, cuts himself so that Elijah will come in to help. Theo locks Elijah in his room and escapes the house with Rachel and Daniel. They meet Lewis and Mel in the town and Elijah turns up and captures them, holding them in an abandoned park. Elijah kills Mel, and shoots Lewis in the chest. Ambulance crew turn up and tend to Lewis, Rachel and Theo. The three are transported to hospital. Elijah abducts Daniel and goes on the run with him.

Theo wakes up in hospital and his mother is distraught over her lies that led to her son being nearly killed. Mrs. Glassman convinces her son that he's safe and she will never, ever let him be in danger again. Theo refuses to listen until his mother surprises him by calling him 'sweetheart,' for the first time in his life. She later goes on to explain about the relocation and allows him to call Jake and Max to say goodbye.

Meanwhile, Rachel is visited by her parents, who are delighted to see her safe and sound and do their best to comfort her. When they almost compare her to her dead sister again, Rachel finally sticks up for herself by saying she's not Rebecca.

Later, Theo says his goodbyes to Rachel and her parents and kisses her before departing for a new life with his mum. Rachel and her parents do the same and leave the hospital.

Months later, Rachel comes home from a taster day at a new school and goes online to chat with Theo. They have a friendly conversation before ending telling each other they hope to see each other again... soon.

== Awards ==
- Richard & Judy's children's books winner 12+
- Blue Peter book of the month
- Winner Red House book award for older readers
- Winner Bolton book award
- Winner Manchester Book Award
- Nominated for the Carnegie Medal in 2008
- Shortlisted for Concorde Book Award (2010)
- Third at the Hampshire Book Awards
- Lancashire Book of the Year 2009, First place

== Sequel ==
In December 2010 the sequel to Blood Ties was published called 'Blood Ransom' which continues the story of Rachel and Theo as they struggle to stop Elijah's plans.
