= Louise Arnold =

Louise Arnold may refer to:

- Louise Arnold (writer)
- Louise Arnold (baseball)
