= Girl, Missing =

2006 young adult thriller novel by Sophie McKenzie

- First edition cover
- Author: Sophie McKenzie
- Language: English
- Genre: Adventure, Action
- Publisher: Simon & Schuster
- Publication date: 2 October 2006
- Publication place: ENGLAND
- Pages: 301 pp
- ISBN: 978-1-4169-1732-8
- OCLC: 70400191
- Followed by: Sister, Missing and Missing, Me

Girl, Missing is a 2006 English-language young adult thriller novel by Sophie McKenzie.

It won the 2007 Bolton Children's Book Award, the 2008 Manchester Book Award and the 2007 Red House Children's Book Award for Older Readers, as well as being longlisted for the Carnegie Medal. It was also one of the books picked for the Richard & Judy Children's Book Club.

== Plot ==
Curious about her birth parents, 14-year-old Lauren Matthews goes on a lost children’s website and finds a US American girl named Martha Lauren Purditt who went missing less than two months before Lauren was adopted; she becomes suspicious that she is Martha. A few days later, she finds a diary containing details about her adoption and the name Sonia Holtwood.

After persuading her family to go on a holiday to the United States, Lauren and her friend James (AKA "Jam") sneak off and meet with Taylor Tarsen, the owner of the agency that handled Lauren's adoption. He refuses to show Lauren her adoption file, but when Lauren mentions Sonia Holtwood, Taylor informs her Sonia looked after her prior to adoption.

Lauren and Jam set out to find Sonia. They run into a police officer Suzanna Sanders who gives them a ride in her car and offers them orange juice. Once in the car, Lauren and Jam begin to feel sleepy. Hours later, they wake up and find their phones and belongings have been taken. They ask Officer Sanders where they are and demand to be let out of the car. She reveals she is Sonia Holtwood and the orange juice was drugged. Sonia dumps them in the middle of nowhere and takes off with their phones and belongings. A man named Glane rescues them and takes them to Boston, where he works.

While with Glane, Lauren discovers that Martha's parents were Annie and Sam Purditt, who live in Evanport. Glane offers to take her there. After Lauren speaks with the Purditts, Annie is the only one who believes her story, while the others are skeptical. They take a DNA test, which confirms they're related.

Later, Lauren's adoptive parents tell her they adopted her believing she was Sonia's child, without realizing she had been kidnapped. Nonetheless, they are accused of abduction and taken to prison. Missing her adoptive family terribly, Lauren argues with Annie, claiming that Annie doesn't love her. Annie replies that she almost killed herself after Lauren went missing.

Lauren moves in with her two sisters, Shelby and Madison Purditt, but has trouble fitting in with the rest of the family. She begins receiving threatening text messages telling her to "keep quiet or die." At first, she believes Shelby is the one sending them, but it turns out to be Sonia Holtwood. Finally, Holtwood sends Lauren a text saying her sister will die unless she goes to Sam's boat, the Josephine May. There, she finds Madison gagged and Sonia with a paid criminal, Frank. Jam appears as the boat starts to sink with everyone still trapped inside. Jam rescues them, but Madison is unconscious.

In the hospital, Annie and Lauren share a true mother–daughter moment, where Lauren sees Annie for who she truly is. Later, back at Sam and Annie's house, Lauren meets her adoptive parents at the door; they say that they have been released from jail and have been invited there by Sam and Annie. All of them have a conversation, and Lauren is asked who she wants to live with: her birth parents or her adoptive parents. She replies that she chooses both. Lauren then goes to the marina with Jam, who confesses his feelings for her.
