= Vampirates: Tide of Terror =

2006 novel by Justin Somper

- Book cover
- Author: Justin Somper
- Cover artist: Bob Lea
- Language: English
- Series: Vampirates
- Genre: Children's, horror
- Published: 2006
- Publisher: Simon & Schuster (UK); Little, Brown (US)
- Publication place: United Kingdom
- Media type: Print (Hardback & paperback)
- Pages: 432 pp (paperback edition)
- ISBN: 1-4169-0141-8 (paperback edition)
- OCLC: 62714965
- Preceded by: Vampirates: Dead Deep
- Followed by: Vampirates: Blood Captain

Vampirates: Tide of Terror, is a 2006 children's novel by British author Justin Somper. It is the sequel to Demons of the Ocean and the second in the Vampirates series.

== Synopsis ==
The adventures of twins Grace and Connor Tempest continue in the second Vampirates novel, Tide of Terror.

Connor may only be fourteen, but he has taken to the life of a pirate like a duck to water. However, his loyalties are divided between his shipmates and his sister. Meanwhile, Grace is not finding pirate life so appealing. She cannot shake the feeling that all is not well on the Vampirate ship she has left behind. Dare she try to return to it?

New experiences await them both, including a journey to the fabled Pirate Academy.

== Characters ==
- Connor Tempest – Fourteen-year-old pirate protégé who loves the pirate life; twin brother of Grace Tempest.
- Grace Tempest – Fourteen-year-old who cares deeply for the Vampirates; twin sister of Connor Tempest.
- Lorcan Furey – Midshipman – Rescues Grace in the first book of the series after seeing her struggling for life; they are in love.
- Vampirate Captain – Mysterious captain of the Vampirate ship, whose authority has been questioned by his crew.
- Darcy Flotsam – Figurehead of the Vampirate ship by day and vampire by night; Grace's friend.
- Sidorio – Vampire who resisted the authority of the Vampirate Captain, resulting in his banishment.
- Cheng Li – Former deputy of the Diablo and current teacher at the Pirate Academy
- Captain Molucco Wrathe – Captain of the Diablo
- Matilda "Ma" Kettle – Owner of Ma Kettle's Tavern
- Shanti - Lorcan Furey's human donor
- Bartholomew "Bart" Pearce – Fellow pirate aboard the Diablo and Connor's best friend
- Cutlass Cate – Becomes deputy of the Diablo once Cheng Li leaves; known for swordsmanship and skill.
- Sugar Pie – Waitress at Ma Kettle's Tavern; sings at parties
- Jez Stukeley – Used to be a pirate aboard the Diablo, another good friend of Connor; he is now a Vampirate. His "master" is Sidorio.
- Commodore Kuo – Headmaster of the Pirate Academy
- Jacoby Blunt – Student at Pirate Academy, becomes good friends with Connor but betrays him in the Lagoon of Doom (Pirate Academy)
- Jasmine Peacock – Student at Pirate Academy, a good friend to Jacoby and Connor

== Reception ==
Carol Thatcher, speaking to Christopher Middleton for The Daily Telegraph, noted the number of strong female characters, also suggesting Somper had done a good job putting together the elements of a children's book.

Diana Tixier Herald of Booklist suggested the book had "appeal for reluctant readers", noting the characteristic "swashbuckling action and horrortinged fantasy".

Louise L. Sherman of School Library Journal was more critical of the book, describing "gratuitously gruesome" vampire murders and an "untenable" premise of honorable pirates, also suggesting the book did not stand on its own.
