= Berserk (novel) =

2007 young adult novel by Ally Kennen

- First edition cover
- Author: Ally Kennen
- Language: English
- Genre: Young adult
- Publisher: Marion Lloyd Books
- Publication date: 7 May 2007
- Publication place: United Kingdom
- Pages: 320 pp
- ISBN: 978-0-439-94372-7
- OCLC: 81453018
- Preceded by: Beast
- Followed by: Bedlam

Berserk is a 2007 young adult novel by Ally Kennen. It was shortlisted for the 2008 Manchester Book Award and longlisted for the 2008 Carnegie Medal.

== Plot ==
Wouldn't it be cool to have a killer as penfriend? 15-year-old Chas is fascinated of this idea. He impersonates his mother and writes to a man, called Lenny, who is in a death row in the USA, because he allegedly had killed a teenager. The Man is from Chas' home town in England. And he actually writes back. A risking game! But that's not all. Chas steals a truck with his friend - only for fun. But the prison, in which the crazy teenagers land, isn't any fun. But he still gets letters by Lenny from America. Just before Chas was released from prison, he is told that Lenny was acquitted because of the absence of proof and that he is on the way to England. What started as game evolved into a nightmare: Lenny wants to pay an old bill. When Chas and his friends realize that THEY are the goal of vengeance, it is nearly too late...
