= Tom Becker (writer) =

British children's writer (born 1981)

Tom Becker (born 19 January 1981), real name Thomas Trevelyan Beckerlegge, is a British children's writer. He studied history at Jesus College, Oxford. He won the Waterstone's Children's Book Prize for his first novel, Darkside, at the age of 25.

== Published books ==
- Darkside (2007)
- Lifeblood (2007)
- Nighttrap (2008)
- Timecurse (2009)
- Blackjack (2010)
- The Traitors (2012)
- While The Others Sleep (2013)
- The Carnival of Ash (2022)

== Awards and nominations ==
- 2007 Darkside won the Waterstone's Children's Book Prize
- 2008 Darkside longlisted for the Manchester Book Award
