= Berta Berkovich Kohút =

Dressmaker and Auschwitz survivor (1921–2021)

Berta Berkovich Kohút

Berta Berkovich Kohút (Slovak: Berta Berkovičová-Kohútová; 8 November 1921 – 14 February 2021) was a Czechoslovak-born survivor of the Auschwitz concentration camp. By the time of her death in 2021, she was the last surviving seamstress who lived through internment at the camp by creating dresses for the wives of Nazi officers.

== Life ==
Berta Berkovich, known as Betka or Bracha, was born on November 8, 1921, in Chepa, a small village then located in the eastern region of Czechoslovakia and now in Ukraine. Her father, Solomon Berkovich, was a tailor by profession and deaf-mute. Her mother, Karolína Štern was originally from Forgolány, Hungary, and the family was Jewish. They relocated to Bratislava in 1926, where Solomon established his own successful tailoring firm, and came to employ three deaf-mute workers. His wife worked with him as an interpreter and fitter for their customers. When she was twelve, Berta was confined in a sanatorium for tuberculosis treatment, and learned to speak Czech. Despite attending a commercial high school, Berta had limited opportunities due to the rising fascism and anti-Semitism in Slovakia. She was taught tailoring by her father.

=== Auschwitz-Birkenau concentration camp ===
In 1942, 21-year-old Berkovich was taken to Auschwitz, along with her sister and around a thousand other women of similar age. She was assigned the identification number 4245. During the peak of the Holocaust, a group of twenty-five young women, primarily Jewish, were chosen to produce high-end garments for prominent Nazi women in a specialized salon at Auschwitz-Birkenau. The Berkovich sisters were among the seamstresses chosen to work in the tailoring studio.

==== Upper Tailoring Studio ====
Hedwig Höss, the wife of camp commandant Rudolf Höss, founded a dressmaking workshop where both everyday dresses and luxurious evening gowns were among the creations. The Obere Nähstube (Upper Tailoring Studio), was operated by female inmates who were selected for their sewing expertise. These women included former couture seamstresses, fashion designers, and salon owners. Marta Fuchs, a Kapo, who headed the studio, worked with inmates like Alida Vasselin, a French corsetière arrested for smuggling anti-Nazi pamphlets in her corsets, and Marilou Colombain, a French Resistance sergeant. Fuchs utilized her abilities and expertise as a former salon owner to recruit additional staff, including her niece, Rozsika, who had minimal sewing skills but assisted with picking up pins.

Because sewing in the studio ensured their relative safety, the seamstresses worked in the internal underground of Auschwitz to help other inmates. Using external fabric suppliers as go-betweens for communications, the tailors kept inmates informed of the progress of the war. They also were able to get messages out of the camp. When the evacuation of the camp was ordered in 1945, the seamstresses gathered warm clothes before being marched across occupied Poland. Although the other family members did not survive, both Berta and Katka were saved by their sewing ability and employment in the tailoring studio.

=== Family ===
After the war, Berkovich married Leo Kohn Kohút, a writer who had lost his first wife in the camps. They initially lived in Bratislava for three years, and then moved to Czechoslovakia, where Kohút worked in the publishing house, Smena. They had two sons, Tom and Emil, who both relocated to Marin County, California. When Czechoslovakia was invaded in 1968, the couple moved to California to be near their children.

== Death ==
Kohút died on February 14, 2021, at Kaiser Permanente Hospital in San Rafael, California. Her death at age 99 from COVID-19 was possibly related to the Kaiser emergency department's repeated refusal to treat her with the life-saving antiviral medication Remdesivir, in spite of her pharmacist son's pleas to do so. Tom Areton stated to The Times of Israel that his mother spent one thousand days in Auschwitz and reportedly expressed the sentiment that she felt as though death could have occurred on numerous occasions during each of those days. When she died, Kohút was the last known surviving seamstress of those who worked in the sewing studio at Auschwitz.

== Legacy ==
In 2017, an oral interview of Kohút was recorded in California and published in an article "My Experiences during a Three-Year Imprisonment in the Auschwitz Concentration Camp" in the journal Judaica et holocaustica in 2019.

British novelist and fashion historian, Lucy Adlington, wrote The Dressmakers of Auschwitz: The True Story of the Women Who Sewed to Survive (2021), after interviewing Kohút. The book provides an account of the manner in which the Nazis profited from confiscating the belongings of deportees, reconditioning them, and making them available for use by citizens of the Reich. In a review, Laura L. Camerlengo, a costume curator at the Fine Arts Museums of San Francisco, noted that the well-documented and researched publication also explores the experiences and personal stories of the seamstresses, like Kohút, who worked in the fashion studio.

== See also ==
- Luise Danz
- Roza Robota
- Alma Rosé
- Mala Zimetbaum
- Sonderkommando
