= Vampirates: Blood Captain =

2007 novel by Justin Somper

- First edition cover
- Author: Justin Somper
- Cover artist: Kev Walker
- Language: English
- Series: Vampirates
- Genre: Children's novel
- Published: 2007 (Simon & Schuster, UK); 2008 (Little, Brown, US)
- Publication place: United Kingdom
- Media type: Print (Hardback & paperback)
- Pages: 569 pp
- ISBN: 978-1-4169-0102-0
- OCLC: 85691648
- Preceded by: Vampirates: Tide of Terror
- Followed by: Vampirates: Black Heart

Vampirates: Blood Captain is a 2007 children's novel written by British author Justin Somper. It is a follow-up to Vampirates: Tide of Terror.

== Synopsis ==
For Connor, these are testing times aboard the Diablo, and he finds himself crossing a line from which there is no return. Grace also faces danger as she travels with Lorcan to Sanctuary, a place of healing presided over by Vampirate guru Mosh Zu.

== Characters ==
- Connor Tempest – Fourteen-year-old orphan, pirate, protagonist, and twin brother of Grace Tempest
- Grace Tempest – fourteen-year-old orphan, protagonist, and twin sister of Connor Tempest
- Lorcan Furey – Grace's rescuer/love, Vampirate, lieutenant of the Nocturne
- Vampirate Captain – Mysterious captain of the Vampirate ship. He wears a mask and no longer drinks blood thanks to the healing of Mosh Zu Kamal.
- Darcy Flotsam – Figurehead of the Vampirate ship by day and vampire by night; Grace's friend.
- Sidorio – Vampire who resisted the authority of the Vampirate Captain, resulting in his banishment.
- Cheng Li – Former deputy of the Diablo and current teacher at the Pirate Academy
- Captain Molucco Wrathe – Captain of the Diablo
- Captain Barbarro Wrathe – Captain of the Typhon; younger brother of Molucco.
- Trofie – Barbarro's wife
- Moonshine Wrathe – Barbarro and Trofie's son; has a dislike for Connor and little respect for anyone else.
- Transom – Head servant on the Typhon
- Matilda "Ma" Kettle – Owner of Ma Kettle's Tavern
- Shanti – Lorcan Furey's human donor
- Bartholomew "Bart" Pearce – Fellow pirate aboard the Diablo and Connor's best friend
- Cutlass Cate – Becomes deputy of the Diablo once Cheng Li leaves; known for swordsmanship and skill.
- Sugar Pie – Waitress at Ma Kettle's Tavern
- Jez Stukeley – Former pirate; returns as a Vampirate lieutenant to Captain Sidorio.
- Commodore Kuo – Headmaster of the Pirate Academy
- Jacoby Blunt – Student at Pirate Academy; becomes good friends with Connor.
- Jasmine Peacock – Student at Pirate Academy, a good friend to Jacoby and Connor
- Mosh Zu Kamal – Founder of Sanctuary
- Olivier – Resident of Sanctuary; Mosh Zu's number two.
- Brenden Gonzalez – One of Connor's shipmates aboard the Diablo
- Dani – An in-between currently residing in Sanctuary
- Johnny – Vampire residing in Sanctuary; becomes Grace's friend while Lorcan is recovering from blindness.
- Jenny – Serving girl at Ma Kettle's Tavern; killed by Jez Stukeley when he was bloodthirsty.

== Reception ==
The Horn Book Guide described the book as "gripping throughout", noting that the ending left much for a followup in the series.
