= Quarry (novel) =

Book by Ally Kennen

- First edition cover
- Author: Ally Kennen
- Language: English
- Genre: Young adult novel
- Publisher: Marion Lloyd Books
- Publication date: 7 February 2011
- Publication place: United Kingdom
- Pages: 224 pp
- ISBN: 978-1-4071-1107-0
- Preceded by: Sparks

Quarry is a novel by Ally Kennen published in February 2011. Until the delivery date, the book was planned to be called "Rites", but on 27 February 2010, the name was officially changed to "Quarry".

== Plot ==
Scrappy, a 15-year-old boy, lives in a breaker's yard next to the motorway and is being sent crazy anonymous dares. Once he gets caught up in them, he finds he can't stop, no matter how much he wants to, and the last challenges send him to the very edge.

== Reception ==
The novel was well received by reviewers.

Mal Peet, writing for The Guardian, praised "Kennen's narrative method"; stating that from the plot synopsis itself the novel may be seen to be "unremittingly bleak", however states that "the combination of point of view and pace urges the reader so swiftly on that there simply isn't time for the novel's Grand Guignol imagery to become ponderous"; concluding that "her grip on noir is as muscular as ever". Philip Womack, for The Daily Telegraph, found the novel to be "involving and scary" and called it an "ultra-modern story with a twist". The novel received a B rating from Wondrous Reads youth-fiction review website, with reviewer Jenny finding the novel to be a "fast-paced ... story of dares and boundaries". She found it to be "tense and genuinely chilling"; but did, however, state that while she found it to be "a refreshing read with a sinister twist", she further felt that "Quarry isn't for those of a nervous disposition!".
