= Finding Violet Park =

2007 young adult novel by Jenny Valentine

- First edition cover
- Author: Jenny Valentine
- Language: English
- Genre: Young adult novel
- Publisher: HarperCollins
- Publication date: 3 January 2007
- Publication place: United Kingdom
- Media type: Print (paperback)
- Pages: 208 pp
- ISBN: 978-0-00-721445-7
- OCLC: 71346653

Finding Violet Park, or Me, the Missing, and the Dead in the U.S., is a young adult novel by Jenny Valentine, published by HarperCollins in 2007. It is about a fatherless teenage boy, Lucas Swain, who finds an urn containing the ashes of the titular Violet Park abandoned in a minicab office and determines to lay her to rest. HarperCollins published the first US edition April 2008, entitled Me, the Missing, and the Dead.

Valentine won the annual Guardian Children's Fiction Prize, a once-in-a-lifetime book award judged by a panel of British children's writers. The novel was also highly commended for the Branford Boase Award, and was longlisted for the 2008 Manchester Book Award.

Jenny Valentine is also the author of Broken Soup, The Ant Colony, and The Double Life of Cassiel Roadnight.

== Synopsis ==
A 16-year-old boy finds an urn in a cab office, containing the ashes of an old lady. Despite only knowing her name — Violet Park — and when she lived, he feels a connection to her. He takes the urn home to give her a better resting-place and tries to find out who she was. During the research he finds out she had a connection to his missing father, and finally confronts questions he never thought about asking.

== Characters ==
- Lucas Swain: The protagonist, almost 16 and with a life full of problems, one day encounters Violet in a cab shop, sparking the search for his father.
- Violet Park: The dead lady, a famous pianist who somehow knew Lucas's father.
- Pete Swain: Lucas's missing father, went missing five years ago and has a mysterious connection with Violet.
- Martha Hooper: Lucas's girlfriend, they are madly in love and she is a big fan of Violet's work.
- Nicky Swain: Lucas's mother, an overprotective lady who still misses her husband even though she hides it. She's a classroom assistant. She likes walking, swimming in summer, reading, knitting, learning to sew, yoga, aggressive cleaning. She's buying things all the time. Mostly beauty products.
- Pansy Swain: Lucas's grandmother, who believes in spirits and agrees that Violet is somehow communicating with Lucas from beyond the grave.
- Norman Swain: Lucas's adoptive grandfather, the war veteran who had a stroke and dips in and out of lucidity. He is not Pete's biological father is he is infertile and Pansy was pregnant before she met him. However he raised Pete and loved him as one of his own. He had a strong bond with Jed.
- Bob Cutforth: The family friend and an old friend of Pete's. He helps the family get through the five years by steadily getting closer to Nicky. He planted a tree when Jed was born on Primrose Hill. He's now an unemployed alcoholic.
- Jed Swain: The brother, Lucas's little brother who Norman tells everything to.
- Mercy Swain: Lucas's sister, a tomboy who doesn't look good in masculine clothes with low self esteem. When Pete disappeared she slammed doors, got into fights and slept around. When Police find Pete's car she doesn't speak for a month.

== Translations ==
- Dutch: Op zoek naar Violet Park. Translated by Jenny de Jonge. Amsterdam: Uitgeverij Moon. 2007. ISBN 9789048800810.
- German: Wer ist Violet Park?, lit. 'Who is Violet Park?'. Translated by Klaus Fritz. Munich: Reihe Hanser. 2009. ISBN 9783423623926.
- Japanese: ヴァイオレットがぼくに残してくれたもの, romanized: Vuaioretto ga boku ni nokoshite kureta mono, lit. 'What Violet Left for Me'. Translated by Hoshi Tominaga. Tokyo: Shogakukan. 2009. ISBN 9784092905085.
- Spanish: Busco a Violet Park. Translated by Mercedes Núñez Salazar. Madrid: Ediciones Alfaguara. 2009. ISBN 9788420474656.
- French: Ma recontre avec Violet Park, lit. 'My Meeting with Violet Park'. Translated by Diane Ménard. Paris: EDL. 2010. ISBN 9782211092227.
- Norwegian: Jakten på Violet Park. Translated by Agnete Øye. Oslo: Cappelen Damm. 2011. ISBN 9788202328665.
