= Vampirates: Black Heart =

2009 novel by Justin Somper

- First edition (UK)
- Author: Justin Somper
- Cover artist: Kev Walker
- Language: English
- Series: Vampirates
- Genre: Children's novel
- Publisher: Simon & Schuster (UK); Little, Brown (US)
- Publication date: 2009
- Publication place: United Kingdom and United States
- Media type: Print (hardback & paperback)
- ISBN: 978-1-4169-0102-0
- OCLC: 85691648
- Preceded by: Vampirates: Blood Captain
- Followed by: Vampirates: Empire of Night

Black Heart is the fourth novel in the Vampirates series by Justin Somper, published in 2009.

== Synopsis ==
There's a new ship of vampirates roaming the seas, leaving a trail of fear and devastation in its wake, led by Sidorio. When a high-profile pirate is slain, the Pirate Federation takes decisive action and dedicates Cheng Li's ship to be the first of many ships to be vampirate assassins.

Amongst the dynamic crew is young pirate prodigy Connor Tempest and two of his academy friends. Meanwhile, Connor's twin sister, Grace, enjoys a bittersweet reunion with their mother, Sally, who has some important and shocking news for her daughter. As Grace uncovers the truth about her family's past, she realizes that she and Connor face a daunting and uncertain future, with the new discovery that they are half vampire and half human. Alas, Sally dies, and Connor then "kills" Lady Lola Lockwood by beheading her with a special sword. Sidorio tries to kill Connor, but Cheng Li tells him that the boy is his son. Cheng Li promises Sidorio that if he lets Connor go, she will bring him Grace, too.

== Characters ==
- Connor Tempest – Fourteen-year-old orphan, pirate, protagonist, dhampir (1/2 vampire 1/2 mortal), and twin brother of Grace Tempest
- Grace Tempest – Fourteen-year-old orphan, protagonist, dhampir (1/2 vampire 1/2 mortal); twin sister of Connor Tempest and love interest of Lorcan Furey.
- Lorcan Furey — Vampirate, lieutenant of the Nocturne; love interest of Grace.
- Sidorio — Biological father of Grace and Connor; self-proclaimed "King of the vampirates", rebel banished from the Nocturne; captain of the Blood Captain.
- Darcy Flotsam – Vampirate and lively crew member of the Nocturne; a good friend of Grace's.
- Moonshine Wrathe – Barbarro and Trofie's son; has a dislike for Connor and little respect for anyone else.
- Matilda ("Ma" or "Kitty") Kettle – Owner of Ma Kettle's Tavern
- Mosh Zu Kamal – Founder of Sanctuary; friend of the Captain and vampirate guru.
- Sugar Pie – Waitress at Ma Kettle's Tavern
- Jez Stukeley – Former pirate; returns as a Vampirate lieutenant to Captain Sidorio.
- Johnny Desperado — Vampire residing in Sanctuary; becomes Grace's friend while Lorcan is recovering from his blindness, but later betrays her; deputy on the Blood Captain.
- Jacoby Blunt — Connor's friend on Cheng li's ship; former student at Pirate Academy, deputy of the Tiger.
- Jasmine Peacock — Pirate on the Tiger, former student at Pirate Academy. She and Connor have feelings for each other, but she does not know how to tell Jacoby, her current "boyfriend".
- Sally — Grace and Connor's mother
- Lady Lola Lockwood — Female vampire, captain of the Vagabond; leads a crew of female vampires; wife of Sidorio.

== Reception ==
Corinda J. Humphrey for School Library Journal noted that the book required familiarity with the series while adding some new characters. She concluded: "This is a fast-paced adventure story with a few surprises along the way."
