= Scottish Book Trust =

Scottish literature charity

Scottish Book Trust is a national charity based in Edinburgh, Scotland promoting literature, reading and writing in Scotland. Scottish Book Trust works with writers and publishers. The trust runs the Scottish Children's Book Award which is funded by Creative Scotland.

The charity was established in 1998.

== Budget ==
Scottish Book Trust invests £3 million annually to fund and promote reading and writing in Scotland. It give a million books to the public and funds over 1,200 literature events including its Bookbug book gifting program. It supports over 400 Scottish writers and illustrators and runs two children's book awards, including the Scottish Children's Book Award. It develops resources to help teachers and librarians to improve literacy.

== Programs ==
=== Early years program ===
Previously known as Bookstart in Scotland, Bookbug gives free books to all Scottish children at around:

- 8 weeks – Bookbug Baby bag
- 18 months – Bookbug Toddler bag
- 3 years – Bookbug Explorer bag
- P1 – Bookbug P1 Family bag

The bags are given with guidance materials for parents and careers, including advice on sharing books with young children, information about libraries, and materials to boost a child’s language, listening skills and early writing.

Bookbug also offers free song-and-rhyme sessions for babies and toddlers in libraries and community centres throughout the country.

=== Children and young people program ===
Scottish Book Trust's children's program aims to get children and young people excited about reading and writing. It reaches over 45,000 children across Scotland every year through live book events and reading and writing campaigns, which include:

- The Bookbug Picture Book Prize and the Scottish Teenage Book Prize, in which children and teens throughout Scotland vote for their favorite book from a shortlist.
- National events, including the Scottish Friendly Children's Book Tour, an outreach tour which brings authors to schools in Scotland and in England.
- The First Minister's Reading Challenge, which 'encourages children to read widely, explore a range of books and develop a love of reading.' Prizes for the challenge are awarded annually in categories that include School Reading Journey, School-Community Reading Partnership and Personal Reading Journey.
- Authors Live, which is presented with BBC Learning Scotland. Authors Live is a series of live-streamed events with authors which are also available on demand
- What's Your Story? A programme that gives free creative writing support to all 13–19-year-old writers and illustrators in Scotland. WYS publishes three issues of an online magazine every year, featuring the work of teen writers, and also runs Storycon, an annual creative writing and illustration conference designed by teens for teens.

=== Writer development program ===
The Writer Development programme offers a range of professional development opportunities for writers at all stages of their careers. Past mentors have included novelists Bernard MacLaverty, Alan Warner, Andrew Crumey and literary agents Judy Moir and Kathryn Ross. Mentoring is also available for emerging authors, as part of the New Writers Awards. Previous Awardees include Gail Honeyman, Pippa Goldschmidt and Graeme Macrae Burnet.

=== Learning professionals ===
Scottish Book Trust works with teachers, librarians and literature development experts to create learning resources, projects and events which promote literacy through literature. It provides resources for teachers based around its program. Every year, Scottish Book Trust also honors an outstanding Learning Professional through its Scottish Book Trust Awards.

=== Book Week Scotland ===
Book Week Scotland takes place every November. The week features hundreds of free events with authors across the country, as well as an associated writing project which the public can participate in.
