= Bedlam (Kennen novel) =

2009 novel by Ally Kennen

- First edition cover
- Author: Ally Kennen
- Language: English
- Genre: Young adult
- Publisher: Marion Lloyd Books
- Publication date: 5 January 2009
- Publication place: United Kingdom
- Pages: 272 pp
- ISBN: 978-1-4071-0385-3
- OCLC: 230990439
- Preceded by: Berserk
- Followed by: Sparks

Bedlam is a young adult novel by Ally Kennen, published on 5 January 2009. It was nominated for the 2010 Carnegie Medal.

== Plot ==
When Lexi Juby arrives in the village where her mother lives, she thinks that she will die of boredom. While searching for her mother's missing dog, the 16-year-old becomes lost in the woods. While there, she is bitten by a wild dog. In despair, Lexi runs away, and reaches a dilapidated building. She breaks out through the rotten floor and lands in a fetid broth. Beside of her, a rat cadaver was floating. The young exhausted girl won't be able to survive in the ice cold water very long...

- Unfinished Plot
