= Kelpies Prize =

Literary award

The Kelpies Prize is a literary award sponsored by Floris Books presented to writers of middle-grade books set in Scotland. The award is sponsored by Floris Books.

== History ==
The award was established in 2004. Between 2010 and 2019, the winner received a £2,000 prize, as well as a publishing deal with Floris Books' Kelpies imprint.

In 2019, Floris Books updated the award. Instead of presenting the award to an author who had already written a middle-grade children's book, they presented it to an author who showed promise in the field. As such, the prize included "a year of mentoring with the editorial team at Floris Books, along with a publication deal, £1,000 (about $1,215) and a week-long writing retreat".

In 2014, Floris Books introduced the Kelpies Prize for Illustration, then known as the Kelpies Design & Illustration Prize. At its onset, the award focused on cover design. When the company revamped the Kelpies Prize in 2019, they also updated the Kelpies Prize for Illustration by asking artists interested in a career in illustration to submit potential illustrations appropriate for a children's book. Winners received "a year of mentoring with the Floris Books design team, as well as a publication deal, £1,000 and a ticket to this year’s Picture Hooks conference". In 2022, the award was reduced to a £500 cash prize, with 9 months of mentoring. In 2023, Floris Books paused the Kelpies Prize for Illustration to focus on their Pathways into Children’s Publishing programme.

== Kelpies Prize for Writing honorees ==
Kelpies Prize for Writing honorees
Year	Title	Author	Result	Ref.
2004		Mike Nicholson	Winner	
2008	Tarantula Tide	Sharon Tregenza	Winner	
2009	Magnus Fin and the Ocean Quest	Janis Mackay	Winner	
2010	The Angel Ashariel	Ritske Rensma	Shortlist	
2010	Operation Bonobo	Elizabeth Spalton	Shortlist	
2010	Red Fever	Caroline Clough	Shortlist	
2011	How to Make a Golem (and Terrify People)	Alette J. Willis	Winner	
2011	The Really Weird Removals Company	Daniela Sacerdoti	Shortlist	
2011	The Resurrection Spell	Roy Gill	Shortlist	
2012	Nicking Time	Tracy Traynor	Winner	
2013	Attack of the Giant Robot Chickens	Alex McCall	Winner	
2013	Never Back	Barbara Henderson	Shortlist	
2013	The Great Moon Mission	Shona McQuilken	Shortlist	
2014	The Mixed-Up Summer of Lily McLean	Lindsay Littleson	Winner	
2014	The Superpower Project	Paul J. Bristow	Shortlist	
2014	My Fake Brother	Joan Pratt	Shortlist	
2015	Slug Boy Saves the World	Mark Smith	Winner	
2015	Drowning in the Mirror	Julie MacPherson	Shortlist	
2015	Monsters M.I.A.	Justin Nevil	Shortlist	
2016	Ruby McCracken: Tragic Without Magic	Elizabeth Ezra	Winner	
2016	The Day My School Exploded (But It Wasn't My Fault!)	Alan McClure	Shortlist	
2016	The Secret of the Tammy Norrie	Christine Laurenson	Shortlist	
2017	The Girl Who Lost Her Shadow	Emily Ilett	Winner	
2017	Lottie Larkin's Magical Mishap	Kate Bolden	Shortlist	
2017	David and the Surprisingly Smart-o-saurus	Debbie Cannon	Shortlist	
2018	The Lost Wizard of Nine Witches Wood	Hannah Foley	Winner	
2018	Haunted Tide	Celia Bryce	Shortlist	
2018	Over the Sea to Sky	Robin Scott-Elliot	Shortlist	
2019		Christopher Mackie	Winner	
2020		Jude Reid	Winner	
2021	No award presented			
2022		Fran Moldaschl	Winner	
2023		Rebekah Fieschi	Winner	
2023		Leanne Dymond	Shortlist	
2023		Bruna De Luca	Shortlist	
2023		Jonathan Stephens	Shortlist	
2023		Jacqueline Thompson-Tadrowski	Shortlist	
2024		Callum Beesley	Winner	
2025		Tem Rae Wilder	Winner	

== Kelpie Prize for Illustration honorees ==
Kelpie Prize for Illustration honorees
Year	Author	Result	Ref.
2014	Astrid Jaekel	Winner	
2014	Mark Doyle	Commended (Note: Mark Doyle and Victoria Pickford each received a £50 prize.)	
2014	Victoria Pickford	Commended	
2015	Lewis Copland	Winner	
2015	Anna Elez Rodrigo	People's choice (Note: Anna Elez Rodrigo received a £75 cash prize.)	
2015	Brad Newman	Highly commended (Note: Brad Newman received a £75 cash prize.)	
2016	Darren Gate	Winner	
2016	Grisel Miranda	People's choice (Note: Grisel Miranda received a £75 cash prize.)	
2017	Aimee Ferrier	Winner	
2017	Grisel Miranda	People's choice (Note: Grisel Miranda received a £75 cash prize.)	
2018	Moira Scicluna Zahra	Winner	
2019	Aimee Ferrier	Winner	
2020	Leanne Goodall	Winner	
2021	No award presented		
2022	Ramune Kregzdyte	Winner	
