= Jimmy Coates: Killer =

2005 novel written by Joe Craig

- Author: Joe Craig
- Language: English
- Series: Jimmy Coates
- Genre: Thriller, Young adult
- Published: March 2005 (HarperCollins)
- Publication place: United Kingdom
- Media type: Print (paperback)
- Pages: 299 pages (21 chapters)
- ISBN: 978-0007196852
- Followed by: Jimmy Coates: Target

Jimmy Coates: Killer, released as Jimmy Coates: Assassin in the United States, is a 2005 novel written by Joe Craig. The story revolves around 11-year-old Jimmy Coates and is mostly set in the fictional dictatorship of the "Neo-Democratic State of Great Britain". It is the first novel in the Jimmy Coates series.

Shortly after the UK publication, it was released in the United States under the title Jimmy Coates: Assassin. It was a finalist for the 2006 Manchester Book Award, and won the Bolton Children's Book Award 2006.

== Development ==
Craig became a songwriter after graduating from Cambridge University but preferred telling stories. He worked on the novel for a year and completed it in 2004. The novel was published in April 2005 by HarperCollins.

== Synopsis ==
Jimmy Coates lives like any other boy in the "Neo-Democratic State of Great Britain". One day while fighting with his elder sister, Georgie, he feels a strange sensation within himself and suddenly, using a fighting technique he had never known before, pins her down. Some men come to their house and talk to his parents, Ian and Helen Coates. They try to take Jimmy with them but he fights them off with surprising strength. These people use a symbol: A green vertical stripe against a black background. They take Jimmy's parents but his sister walks off.

Jimmy escapes from them but is followed by Mitchel, a 13-year-old thief and snatcher who tries to rob him. Jimmy easily defeats him and persuades him to take him to the police station. At the police station the police too try to capture Jimmy but he escapes and takes refuge in his friend Felix's house. He contacts his school teacher, Miss Bennett, who doesn't believe him. He is discovered but escapes via helicopter. He throws the pilot off the helicopter and amazingly he is able to pilot the craft. He is followed but escapes by jumping into the Thames River, discovering he can breathe under water. Next morning, he is found by his sister and her friend Eva's family but Eva's parents betray Jimmy and drug him. When he wakes up he finds that he is a genetically engineered assassin and is only 38% human. His neighbor, Dr. Higgins, was on the team who developed him. The Green Stripe is an organization working for the government also called NJ7. He also finds out that Mrs Bennett is an NJ7 agent and his own parents are former agents.

He meets the Prime Minister Ares Hollingdale and is ordered to murder Christopher Viggo a person who supports bringing back democracy. He attempts to kill Viggo but instead joins Viggo, who plans to bring down the present government. Viggo is a former NJ7 agent. Together they rescue Felix and Georgie.

All of them (except Yannick who is on another mission) get into the catacombs of NJ7 with Felix's help (he opens a hidden doorway while trying to get free chocolate from a vending machine). They are joined in the tunnels by Yannick. Jimmy goes to the Prime Minister and finds him along with Jimmy's parents and Miss Bennett. He knocks out Hollingdale and Bennett while Viggo steals a helicopter from the French Embassy and waits for Jimmy. Ian refuses to go with Jimmy because of his loyalty to the government but Helen comes with the group. They fly below the radar and head for France.

In the last pages we find that Mitchell is also a genetically engineered assassin and the Prime Minister decides to bring him in to kill Jimmy.

=== Major characters ===
- Jimmy Coates – a young, genetically modified assassin and the series' protagonist
- Helen Coates – Jimmy's mother
- Eva Doren – Georgie's friend who works in NJ7, but she is actually giving information to Jimmy about NJ7's plans
- Georgie Coates – Jimmy's half-sister
- Felix Muzebeke – Jimmy's best friend
- Dr. Higgins – scientist who helped to create Jimmy
- Christopher Viggo – Campaigner
- NJ7 – The fictitious government agency that pursues, and designed, Jimmy Coates
- Miss Bennett – Director of NJ7
- Paduk – Ex Director of Special Security for the Neo-Democratic State of Great Britain
- Ian Coates – Jimmy's adopted father
- Ares Hollingdale – The Prime Minister of Great Britain
- Dr. Higgins – Part of the team that built Jimmy & Mitchell

== Critical reception ==
Hillias J. Martin, writing for School Library Journal, described Jimmy Coates: Killer as "all action" and noted that it "reads as a more lighthearted mystery for younger readers than Anthony Horowitz's Alex Rider books". Despite lacking "the calculated cruelty and technical ingenuity" of the Rider books, Martin concluded that "Jimmy's humorous mishaps and athletic thrills will leave middle-grade boys drooling for the next installment."

Booklist's Jennifer Mattson also compared Jimmy Coates: Assassin to the Alex Rider books, suggesting the novel for "readers not quite ready for the darker extremes". However, Mattson found that "the story feels as engineered as its bionic hero", but indicated that "Craig acquits himself admirably within the paint-by-numbers structure".
