= Vampirates =

Series of children's books by Justin Somper

Vampirates is a series of books by British author Justin Somper about a set of twin children, Connor and Grace Tempest, who get separated at sea and are picked up by two very different ships. The term Vampirate refers to a vampire living on the pirate ship Nocturne, later changed to Nocturnal to differentiate themselves from rebellious and uncontrolled Vampirates.

== Plot ==
The year is 2512 and the Tempest twins, Grace and Connor, decide to escape their small town of Crescent Moon Bay after their father's death. They take their father's boat, which has been claimed by the bank, out into the ocean in the middle of a horrible storm and become shipwrecked. Saved by a passing pirate ship, Connor is pulled aboard by the pirate Cheng Li and quickly adjusts to his new life as a pirate prodigy. Meanwhile, Grace is rescued from the sea by the Irish vampire pirate (Vampirate) Lorcan Furey and pulled onto a strange ship. She soon discovers that she is on a Vampirate ship. As the twins fight to find each other, they discover that they have chosen different paths and loyalties.

== Characters ==
=== Main ===
Grace Tempest: Described as being highly intelligent, Grace is rescued by Lorcan Furey of the Nocturne. Despite her initial fears, she grows to enjoy the company of her new peers, especially Lorcan, Darcy Flotsam (the ship's figurehead, who comes to life at night), and the mysterious captain. She is more open-minded than her brother and is willing to accept the Vampirate ways, rather than dismiss them as cruel. Later in the series, she often leaves her brother to return or stay with the ship. Grace and Connor are later classified as dhamphirs (half mortal, half vampire).

Connor Tempest: introduced as an athletic boy who excels in sports, he appears slightly less intelligent that his sister. He is also more afraid of the ocean than Grace. He is rescued by Cheng Li, the deputy captain of the Diablo, a pirate ship. Although he is initially preoccupied with finding his sister, Connor quickly settles down into life aboard the ship, and becomes a prodigy in the eyes of the captain, Molucco Wrathe, and his crewmates Bart, Jez, and Cate. However, Connor is uneasy with certain aspects of pirate life, primarily killing, and this forces him to evaluate his life and future as a pirate.

=== Crew of the Nocturne ===
Lorcan Furey – Lorcan maintains many roles upon the Nocturne, and he rises through the ranks as the series continues. First introduced when he saves Grace from drowning, he is described as having an "Irish brogue", with blue eyes and black hair. Lorcan was born in Ireland and 'crossed' when he was seventeen.

The Captain – a mysterious man in charge of the Nocturne who largely remains nameless. The captain is later revealed to be Obsidian Darke. He is selfless, to the point of physically carrying troubled souls within his body, even when it nearly kills him. He cares deeply for the twins and develops an especially strong bond with Grace. He does not need blood, instead feeding off a type of energy. He also differs from other Vampirates in that he is telepathic, able to go out into the light, and his cloak is of a similar material to the sails of his ship in that it appears to have veins of light in it. He wears a mask during most of the series, and though it covers his face, Grace can tell when he smiles at her.

Darcy Flotsam – figurehead of the Vampirate ship by day and "figure of fun" by night. Her origin traces back to when the ship she sang on sank, and her soul became infused with a figurehead. Darcy is highly fashion-conscious and often lends clothes to her friends. She is Grace's best friend, and Grace often consults her on matters of the heart.

Quintus Antonius Sidorio – a criminal born in the time of Julius Caesar in Cilicia, it is later discovered that Sidorio kidnapped Caesar and was killed after being tricked. Vain and violent, he is banished from the Nocturne after trying to attack Grace. He forms a ship of rebels and unlike the Nocturne, they feed whenever and wherever they like, often ravaging whole coastal towns. Later, it is revealed that he is Grace and Connor's real father.

The donors – donors are humans who live on the Nocturne. Even though they are not vampires, they are immortal, while being fed on frequently. Many have a special relationship with the vampire who feeds on them. The 'sharing' is done once a week, at a lavish event called simply 'the Feast'. The donors are fed a special diet of high-nutrient food, so that the vampires require less to survive. It is revealed that when a vampire stops feeding from a donor, they age rapidly.

=== Crew of the Diablo ===
Captain Molucco Wrathe – Molucco is the captain of the Diablo and is one of three pirate brothers. He is famous for his love of treasure and his disregard for others in his quest to obtain it. On this matter, he often argues with his deputy, Cheng Li. Also, for the snake, Scrimshaw, that lives in his hair. Although he appears kind and trustworthy, he is revealed to be manipulative and selfish, ensuring Connor signs his articles before experiencing any other life away from the Diablo.

Cheng Li – introduced as the deputy on the Diablo, she later gets her own ship, the Tiger, given to her as a gift by the Pirate Federation. She is known to be very serious about almost everything. She is the one who saves Connor from drowning. She clashes frequently with Molucco on how to captain the ship, arguing that he should abide by the rules. It is later revealed she works for the Federation and was hired to bring Molucco into line.

Bartholomew "Bart" Pearce – a twenty-two-year-old pirate aboard the Diablo, he quickly strikes up a friendship with Connor, even donating his clothes and bed to him when he first arrives. He also acts as a guide, showing Connor the ropes and helping him settle down. He wields a broadsword, on account of his size. He constantly flirts with his fellow crew member Cate, and later on in the series, it appears they are in a budding relationship. Bart, along with Connor and Jez, make up the Three Buccaneers.

Cutlass Cate – notoriously the best fighter on the Diablo, she is also the battle strategist, and later in the series, others come to hire her services. Regardless of her reputation, she is kind and generous, something that has made her many friends. She is promoted to deputy captain on the Diablo after Cheng Li leaves. She teaches Connor how to wield a sword as a reward for him saving Molucco's life. These lessons bring the two close. She, along with Bart, eventually join Cheng Li's crew on the Tiger.

=== Sanctuary ===
Mosh Zu – a mysterious healer and the leader of Sanctuary. He, like the Captain, does not require blood and feeds on energy. He is extremely passive and encourages other vampires to go to the Nocturne, where they may control their hunger and be free to be themselves. He forms a close bond with Grace, recognizing her potential as a healer.

Johnny Desperado – a former cowboy, often referred to as a vaquero on account of his Mexican heritage, he is a vampire staying at Sanctuary. Grace first comes in contact with him when she accidentally reads his ribbon, learning his crossing story. When she finally meets him, the two strike up a friendship over chess. However, he flees Sanctuary with Sidorio after his tea is spiked with blood, and aboard the prison ship, he becomes close friends with Jez Stukeley.

Olivier – Mosh Zu's first assistant, he is seemingly trustworthy, if a little cold. He is neither vampire nor donor and describes himself as 'an in-between'. However, it is revealed that he has been secretly manipulated by Sidorio, and he spikes the vampire's berry tea with blood, causing a frenzy and resulting in a large number of vampires leaving Sanctuary and joining Sidorio's forces.

=== Miscellaneous ===
Sugar Pie – a waitress at Ma Kettle's Tavern, she is attractive and feisty and is known to comfort Connor and various other characters throughout the series.

Matilda "Ma" Kettle – the owner of Ma Kettle's Tavern, she is striking in appearance and personality and is known to wear highly eccentric dresses. She seems to have a close relationship with Molucco Wrathe, and the two often flirt and hint at previous times together.

Dexter Tempest – the twins' father, he was the lighthouse keeper at Crescent Moon Bay but died at the start of the first book. He met the twins' mother, Sally, on a trip around the world when she was a donor on the Nocturne. He took a job as a kitchen porter to be close to her and suggested they leave together. He became father to the twins after they were born and Sally was resting at Sanctuary, so as to protect them from their real father. In the fourth book, his soul and that of Sally's are reunited.

Sally – mother of the twins, she was a donor to Sidorio on the Nocturne. Sidorio was, unknown to anyone else at the time, in love with Sally. When Dexter came aboard the ship with plans to leave with her, Sidorio impregnated her with a spell. It is revealed that the Captain has been harbouring her soul.

== Series ==
1. Vampirates: Demons of the Ocean (2005)
2. Vampirates: Dead Deep (short story, 2007)
3. Vampirates: Tide of Terror (2007)
4. Vampirates: Blood Captain (2008)
5. Vampirates: Black Heart (2009)
6. Vampirates: Empire of Night (2010)
7. Vampirates: Immortal War (2011)

== In other media ==
- The Vampirates book series makes a brief appearance in the 2011 episode "The Book Job" of The Simpsons.
