= Lifeblood (novel) =

2007 novel by Tom Becker

- First edition cover
- Author: Tom Becker
- Language: English
- Series: Darkside
- Genre: Children's
- Publisher: Scholastic
- Publication date: 1 October 2007
- Publication place: United Kingdom
- Media type: Print (Paperback)
- Pages: 240 pp
- ISBN: 978-1-4071-0285-6
- OCLC: 159661688
- Preceded by: Darkside
- Followed by: Nighttrap

Lifeblood is a children's novel by Tom Becker, first published in 2007. It is the sequel to Darkside, and the second in a planned series of five. Jonathan Starling has remained in Darkside with Mr.Carnegie. As with the first story in the series, the pair gets drawn into a mystery that soon turns to them trying to solve a murder. They are approached to discover who an unknown victim is. The problem is that the victim was murdered the same way as another infamous member of Darkside society twelve years ago. The first known murder victim had been an heir to the Ripper throne.

== Plot ==
Jonathan has learned more history of Darkside in his days of living in the evil society. Darkside is ruled by the descendants of Jack the Ripper. When the current ruler dies, the offspring of the ruler must fight the Blood Succession, an all-out, no-bars death match in which victor is the new ruler of Darkside. When the murder victim of twelve years ago was revealed to be a hidden Ripper heir, the city erupted in to an uproar. Can the new murder be connected to the old crime?

Jonathan and Carnegie are aided by members of the Darkside's newspaper. There, Jonathan learns that his missing mother was a reporter for them, and disappeared around the same time as the infamous murder occurred. Jonathan is certain that the two events must be connected. If they can solve the latest crime, maybe he can discover what has happened to his mother.

Jonathan heads back to Lightside to discover more answers. He discovers that Lucien Fox (aka Brother Fleet) is one of the two remaining Rippers. He returns to Darkside and goes to the private Cain Club with Carnegie. There, Lucien transforms into a Black Phoenix and attacks them. In the middle of the battle, Marianne comes and reveals herself as a Ripper. Everybody soon leaves.

== Reception ==
Jake Pettit, writing for School Library Journal, called Lifeblood "totally cool" and recommended the novel for "readers who love Harry Potter, as well as fans of all things dead and undead". They further highlighted the novel's "fantastical characters [...], outrageous settings [...], and plotlines".
