= Scottish Children's Book Award =

The Scottish Children's Book Award is awarded by the Scottish Book Trust. The awards are made as the result of children voting for their favourite book. In 2006 the award was won by J.K.Rowling, Catherine MacPhail and Simon Puttock. The award is funded by Creative Scotland. In 2015, 38,000 children cast their vote.

== How ==
The contest was organised by the Scottish Book Trust and winners were decided by Scottish children. Over several months they would read three shortlist books and then they voted for their favourites. Winners were announced in three different age categories.

== Awards include ==
In 2006 the awards were won by J.K.Rowling for Harry Potter and The Half Blood Prince, Catherine MacPhail and Simon Puttock.

Cassidy won the 2007 Scottish Children's Book Award (12–16) for her book Scarlett.

John Fardell won the younger category in 2012 for his picture book The Day Louis Got Eaten!.

The Accidental Time Traveller which was written by Janis Mackay won the award in 2013. Her book was set in Peebles.

Catherine MacPhail won the award for a third time in 2015.

The 2016 awards were the result of a shortlist published in The Guardian. Each of the chosen authors chose their classic Scottish children's book. The awards went to Ross MacKenzie, Danny Weston and again to Simon Puttock.
