= Sharon Tregenza =

British writer

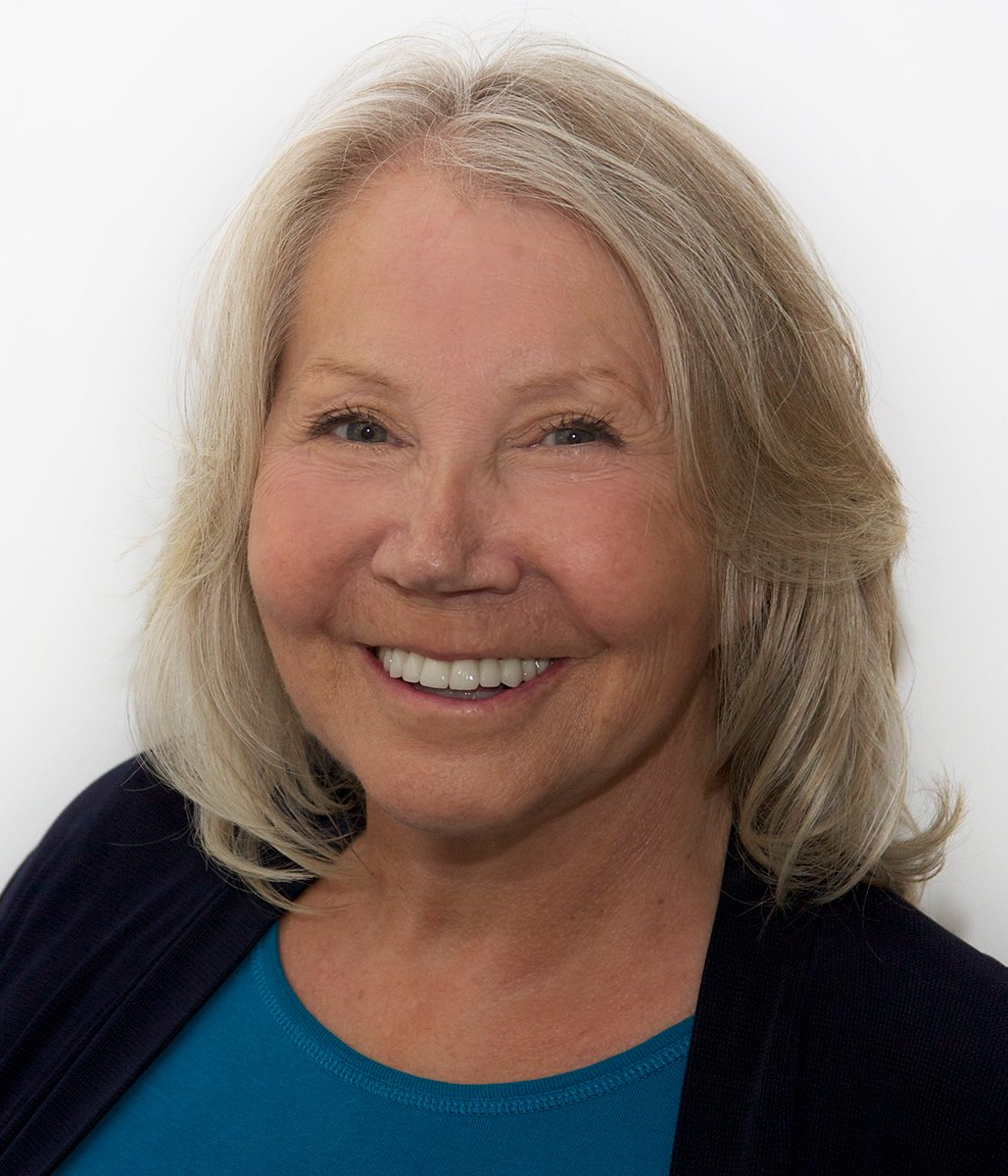
- Born: Penzance, Cornwall, England
- Education: MA in Creative Writing, MA in Writing for Young People
- Occupation: Children's Author
- Children: Ross Tragenza, 1 daughter
- Writing career
- Genre: Children's mystery fiction
- Notable works: Tarantula Tide, The Shiver Stone, The Jewelled Jaguar, Stargazey Pie
- Website: www.sharontregenza.com

Sharon Tregenza (née Rosewall) is a British author of children's books, stories and verse.

She was born and grew up in Penzance, Cornwall. Her work has been described as mystery with a touch of magic. She was the inaugural winner of the Kelpies Prize.

== Personal life ==
Tregenza travelled with her husband and two children, living for many years in Cyprus, Dubai and Sharjah, where she worked in the library of the American School of Dubai. She then taught conversational English to local girls before returning to the United Kingdom to study at the University of Bristol.

After moving to Pembrokeshire, she completed her MA in creative writing at the University of Wales Trinity Saint David and acquired a second MA in writing for young people at Bath Spa University.

Tregenza lives, and writes, in a converted chapel in the village of Box, just outside the historic city of Bath.

== Awards & Prizes ==
- Calderdale Best Children's Book of the Year, 2018, for Jewelled Jaguar
- Fantastic Book Award
- East Sussex Children's Book
- Kelpie's Prize, for Tarantula Tide
- Heart of Hawick Award
- Tir Na n-Og Welsh Children's Book Award (twice), 2018, shortlisted for Jewelled Jaguar
- North Somerset Teacher's Book Award (twice), shortlisted

== Books ==
=== Tarantula Tide ===
Published 16 October 2008 by Floris,

In August 2008, Sharon won Floris Books' Kelpies Prize 2008 Award at the Edinburgh Book Festival. As a result, the book she submitted, Tarantula Tide, about young sleuths in Shetland, was published by Floris, on 16 October 2008. The book also received the Heart of Hawick Children's Book Award, voted for by schoolchildren, in 2010.

=== The Shiver Stone ===
Published 2014 by Firefly Press, Illustrated by Xavier Bonet, cover design Zoe Draws Things. The Shiver Stone is a middle-grade thriller set in a coastal town in Pembrokeshire, South Wales.

=== The Jewelled Jaguar ===
Published 15 September 2017 by Firefly Press, illustrated by Xavier Bonet, cover design Zoe Draws Things.

=== Stargazey Pie ===
'Oxford Reading Tree Word Sparks: Level 8: Stargazey Pie - Oxford Reading Tree Word Sparks'

Published 26th Oct 2020

== Family ==
Tregenza's son (Ross Tragenza) works in video game music and helped compose the soundtrack for TimeSplitters: Future Perfect, The Crysis Series and Deathloop where the soundtrack was nominated for a BAFTA in 2022 and for an award at The Game Awards 2021. He also worked on some additions to the Cyberpunk 2077 soundtrack where the score was also nominated for the same category at The Game Awards 2021.
