= The Scottish Friendly Children's Book Tour =

The Scottish Friendly Children's Book Tour is a programme devised and created by Scottish Book Trust in 1998. It is currently sponsored by Scottish Friendly and is designed to take leading children's authors to schools and libraries throughout the United Kingdom to allow young people and teachers to meet and be inspired by the authors.

Leading authors who have participated on the tours are Julia Donaldson, Michael Rosen, Jacqueline Wilson, Melvin Burgess, Malorie Blackman, Steve Cole, Michael Morpurgo, Chris Riddell and Sophie Mackenzie.

The Scottish Friendly Children's Book Tour has won the following awards:

- Arts and Business Scotland Arts & Kids Award (2005)
- Arts and Business Scotland Young People Award (2010)

The Tour was highly commended in the Arts and Business Scotland Sustained Partnership Award in 2011 and 2012.
