= Darkside (novel) =

2007 children's novel by Tom Becker

- First edition cover
- Author: Tom Becker
- Cover artist: Studio Spooky
- Language: English
- Series: Darkside
- Genre: Children's
- Publisher: Scholastic
- Publication date: 6 June 2007
- Publication place: United Kingdom
- Media type: Print (Paperback)
- Pages: 256 pp
- ISBN: 978-0-439-94436-6
- OCLC: 71541663
- Followed by: Lifeblood

Darkside is a 2007 children's novel by Tom Becker, about a boy called Jonathan Starling who discovers a world hidden in London; a world run by Jack the Ripper's family. Only the worst of the worst live here, and all too quickly Jonathan gets mixed up in a world full of murders, thieves, a werewolf and a vampire. Not to mention the cunning servant Raquella, she helps Jonathan get to his dad on time. They go on the ghost train on the Dark Line on Savage Row. Jonathon promises Raquella that one day, he'll help Raquella run away from her master, as her master is the vampire. It was Published in 2007 by Scholastic. It won the 2007 Waterstone's Children's Book Prize and was longlisted for the 2008 Manchester Book Award. Darkside also won the Calderdale Children's Book of the year Award.

== Synopsis ==
Jonathan Starling is a very unlucky and shy teen. He doesn't really have a social life and lives by himself due to his dad's strange illness. Or, at least that was his happy life in “Lightside”. He had nearly been kidnapped by a bounty hunter and taken to the very mysterious place known as Darkside. Since he has been attacked by a werewolf, been close to being stabbed with a knife and swam in the “pool of pain”. Meanwhile, back in Lightside. Detectives are trying to put the puzzle pieces together and find the kidnapper of Jonathan. Also, Ricky Thomas has been taken there and has been demanded to fight jackals. Just what is the real reason that they are in Darkside?

== Reception ==
S. F. Said, writing for The Guardian, said "It's a marvellously convincing dystopia; the only downside is that Darkside, when we get there, seems friendlier than modern London. Perhaps that's Becker's point: that the Victorians' grotesque nightmares are less terrifying than the everyday reality we've since created. We never see enough of Darkside to be certain of this; but tantalising hints suggest that the shadow-city will be more deeply and fully developed in sequels."
