= Roxy's Baby =

2005 young adult novel by Catherine MacPhail

- First edition
- Author: Catherine MacPhail
- Language: English
- Publisher: Bloomsbury
- Publication date: 6 June 2005
- Publication place: United Kingdom
- Media type: Print (Paperback)
- Pages: 272 pp
- ISBN: 978-0-7475-7042-4
- OCLC: 224311899

Roxy's Baby is a 2005 young adult novel by Catherine MacPhail. It is about a fifteen-year-old girl named Roxy who becomes pregnant and subsequently runs away from home.

== Plot ==
Roxy is a fifteen-year-old girl living with her mother, her younger sister, and her new step-dad. Upset about her father's death and resentful of her mother remarrying, she begins to rebel. She attends a party where she has sex for the first time. Soon realising she's pregnant, Roxy runs away from home in fear. She goes to London, hoping to stay a shelter she read about, but quickly leaves when she realises the woman in charge will phone the police, when she learns Roxy is underage.

Luckily, she finds help in the form of Mr and Mrs Dyce, a couple who host young pregnant women in their country house. Things quickly become suspicious; the girls in the Dyces' care are completely cut off from the rest of the world, not allowed to leave the grounds, or even read newspapers or listen to the radio, and once a girl is sent into the birthing room she's never seen again. The Dyces have answers to all of these, but things still seem odd.

One night Roxy slips out, and discovers the Dyces have a sinister motive behind their kindness.

== Reception ==
It won the 13–16 years category at the 2006 Royal Mail Awards for Scottish Children's Books. It was also shortlisted for the Manchester Book Award and longlisted for the Carnegie Medal.
