= Ally Kennen =

British author

- Born: 1975 (age 49–50)
- Occupation: Author
- Language: English
- Genre: Thriller

Ally Kennen (born 1975) is a British author of adventure novels for children and teens. Some of her books have been marketed as thrillers and they may be classed as horror fiction.

She was born in Somerset and grew up on a farm in the Exmoor region of South West England. She studied Archaeology and History at the University of Birmingham.

== Writer ==
Kennen's first book, Beast, was created during a Master of Arts program in Creative Writing at Bath Spa University. It was published by Marion Lloyd Books in 2006 and the British librarians named it one of six finalists for the annual Carnegie Medal, which recognises the year's best children's book published in the UK The judges recommended it for readers age 12 and up.

Her fourth book, Sparks, published by Marion Lloyd in 2010, was one of eight books on the longlist for that year's Guardian Children's Fiction Prize. The Prize is judged by a panel of children's writers and it annually recognises one new British children's novel by an author who has not won it. The judges recommended Sparks for readers age 9 and over. According to their summary, the adventure novel features three children who decide to follow their deceased grandfather's unusual instructions regarding his funeral. The mission sets them against the adults in the family and against the law.

Two years later Kennen made the Guardian Prize longlist again with Bullet Boys, published by Scholastic in 2012 (recommended for ages 14+). It had been The Guardian newspaper's "teen book of the month" for March, initiated by Anthony McGowan's review and by Kennen's account, "How I wrote Bullet Boys".

== Works ==
- Beast (2006)
- Berserk (2007)
- Bedlam (2009)
- Sparks (2010)
- The Hedgehog Mystery (2011)
- Quarry (2011)
- Bullet Boys (2012)
- Daybreak (2012)
- Midnight Pirates (2013)
- How To Speak Spook (And Stay Alive) 2015

Udfordring 20289 N#####

== Awards and nominations ==
Beast won the 2007 Manchester Book Award. Berserk won a 2008 North East Teenage Book Award.

Kennen has been nominated for many other annual book awards.

- Beast (2006) made shortlists for the Carnegie Medal, the Booktrust Teenage Prize, the Branford Boase Award, and the Bolton Children's Book Award
- Berserk (2007) made the Manchester Book Award shortlist and was nominated for the Carnegie Medal.
- Bedlam (2009) was nominated for the Carnegie Medal (2010) and made shortlists for the Solihull Children's Book Award, the UKLA, the Salford Children's Book Award, the Calderdale Children's Book, and the Stockport Schools Book Award. It made the Guardian Prize longlist and was nominated for the Carnegie Medal.
- Quarry (2012) made shortlists for the Coventry Inspiration Book Awards, the Grampian Children's Book Award, and the Leeds Book Awards. It made the UKLA longlist and was nominated for the Carnegie Medal.
- Bullet Boys (2012) made the 2012 Guardian Prize longlist.
