= Vampirates: Empire of Night =

2010 novel by Justin Somper

- First edition cover
- Author: Justin Somper
- Illustrator: Asif Ali Zardari
- Cover artist: Gilani Sahab
- Language: English
- Series: Vampirates
- Genre: Children's novel
- Publisher: Simon & Schuster (UK); Little, Brown (US)
- Publication date: 2010
- Publication place: United Kingdom, United States
- Media type: Print (hardback & paperback)
- ISBN: 1-4169-1652-0
- OCLC: 85691648
- Preceded by: Vampirates: Black Heart
- Followed by: Vampirates: Immortal War

Vampirates: Empire of Night is the fifth book in the Vampirates series, written by children's author Justin Somper. It was published by Simon & Schuster in Britain on 4 March 2010 and by Little, Brown Books in America on 1 August 2010. ISBN 1-4169-1652-0

== Synopsis ==
Sidorio, fuelled by grief and revenge, is intent on becoming King of the Vampirates and building a new empire to bring terror to the oceans. He faces growing opposition from both the Pirate Federation, including vampirate Assassin Cheng Li, and the Nocturnals—the more benign vampirate realm—led by Mosh Zu and Lorcan Furey. Both the pirates and the Nocturnals are forced to raise their game in response to the new and urgent threat from Sidorio and the renegade vampirates. Twins Grace and Connor Tempest, still ricocheting from the recent discovery of their true parenthood and its explosive implications, are thrust deep into the heart of the conflict. Old foes and allies are thrown together in unexpected ways and, as the stakes rise higher than ever before, Grace and Connor find their alliances shifting in ways no one could ever have foreseen.

== Characters ==
- Connor Tempest – pirate prodigy, dhampir (1/2 vampire 1/2 mortal); twin brother of Grace Tempest and son of Sidorio
- Grace Tempest – girlfriend of Lorcan, twin sister of Connor Tempest, daughter of Sidorio
- Lorcan Furey – vampirate, commander of the Alliance; boyfriend of Grace Tempest
- Mosh Zu – vampirate guru and healer; founder and leader of Sanctuary
- Obsidian Darke – vampirate captain
- Sidorio – leader of the rebel vampirates, captain of the Blood Captain; father of Grace and Connor Tempest
- Lady Lola Elizabeth Mercy Lockwood Sidorio – wife of Sidorio, captain of the Vagabond
- Johnny Desperardo – vampire, deputy of Sidorio, captain of the Diablo
- Cheng Li – captain of the Tiger, commodore of the Alliance
- Darcy Flotsam – vampirate, figurehead of the Nocturne

== Reception ==
Sue Wardell for The Bookseller recommended it, writing: "[The book] is an ongoing story set in a future affected by global warming, with central characters of orphaned 14-years-old boy/girl twins and their growing relationships and exploits with the vampires and pirates suggested by the title, so lots of avenues for the imagination".
