= Janis Mackay =

Scottish author (born 1959)

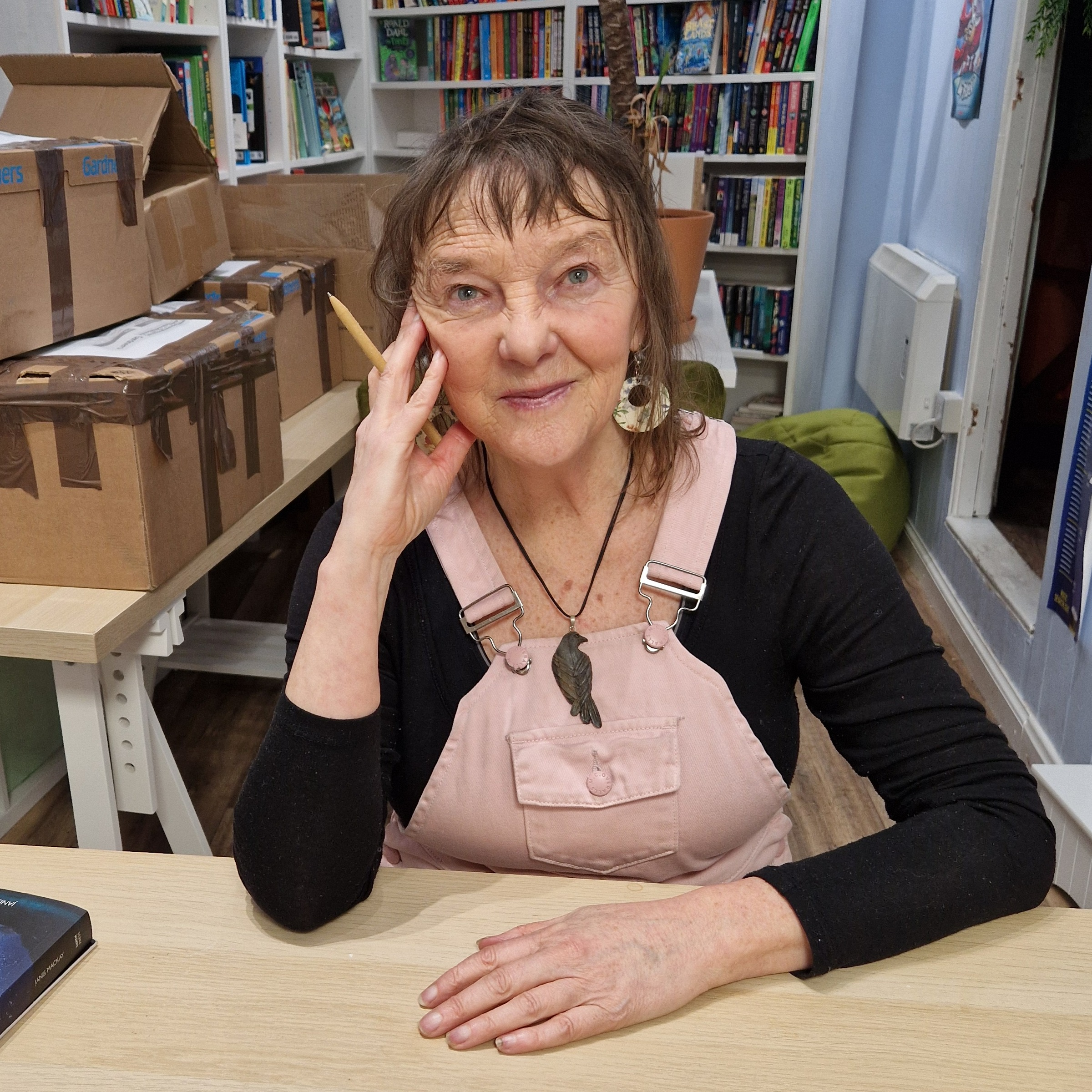
- in 2026
- Born: 1959 (age 66–67); Edinburgh
- Occupations: writer, poet and story teller
- Writing career
- Genre: children's books
- Website: www.janismackay.com

Janis Mackay (born 1959) is a Scottish writer and author of a dozen books, mostly for children. She has won the Kelpies Prize and the Scottish Children's Book Award. Her first book for adults was published in 2025. She also works as a lecturer in creative writing for Edinburgh University.

== Life ==
Mackay was born in Edinburgh in 1959. When she was 21 she set out on a career as a journalist in London, but she discovered that this was not the job she was looking for. She became a drama teacher when she returned from a break where she travelled.

Mackay left drama teaching to study creative writing at the University of Sussex where she completed a master's degree in 2004.

She was appointed as a writer in residence by the Scottish Arts Council to reside in Caithness in northern Scotland. She was there for five years and she wrote poetry about the landscape and her first book. Magnus Fin and the Ocean Quest, won the Kelpies Prize in 2009. The next book, Magnus Fin and the Selkie Secret, continued the story.

Mackay had a short residence in Helsinki in 2012.

In 2013 she won the Scottish Children's Book Award for her book The Accidental Time Traveller. She received £3,000. She was congratulated by The Guardian and the paper published a list of the top ten books she had read that were set "on the ocean". Her first choice was Kidnapped.

In 2022 she was one of ten writers who created work to support a bid to gain UNESCO World Heritage Status for the Flow Country. The Flow Country of Caithness and Sutherland and its blanket bog system gained World Heritage Status in 2024.

Her thirteenth book was her first for adults and it was published in 2025. The story is set in a fictional village by the sea in Caithness and it concerns a lonely fisherman and his encounter with what he believes to be a selkie.

== Family ==
Mackay's aunt Helen Crummy founded the Craigmillar Festival Society and she has a statue in Edinburgh.

== Awards ==
- Kelpies Prize in 2009
- Scottish Children's Book Award

== Books include ==
- Magnus Fin and the Ocean Quest
- Magnus Fin and the Selkie Secret
- Magnus Fin and the Ocean Quest
- The Accidental Time Traveller
- The Reluctant Time Traveller
- The Unlikely Time Traveller
- The Selkie Girl
- The Fairy Song (illustrated by Ruchi Mhasane)
- Jump into the New (illustrated by Alfredo Belli)
- The Watchmakers Wife
- The Wee Seal (with Gabby Grant)
- Wild Song
- On a Northern Shore, 2025
