= Jenny Valentine =

English children's novelist (born 1970)

- Born: 1970 (age 55–56); Cambridge, England
- Education: Goldsmiths' College
- Occupation: Children's novelist
- Spouse: Alex Valentine
- Children: 2
- Writing career
- Language: English
- Years active: 2007–present
- Genre: Children's literature
- Notable works: Finding Violet Park (2007); Broken Soup (2008)
- Notable awards: Guardian Children's Fiction Prize

Jenny Valentine (born 1970) is an English children's novelist. For her first novel and best-known work, Finding Violet Park (HarperCollins, 2007), she won the annual Guardian Children's Fiction Prize, a once-in-a-lifetime book award judged by a panel of British children's writers. Valentine lives in Glasbury-on-Wye, Wales with her husband singer/songwriter Alex Valentine, with whom she runs a health food shop in nearby Hay-on-Wye.

== Writer ==
HarperCollins has published Valentine's novels in Britain and usually one year later in America. Finding Violet Park (2007) was re-titled Me, The Missing and The Dead in the US (2008). Beside winning the Guardian Prize it made the shortlist (seven finalists that year) for the annual Carnegie Medal, which the British librarians confer upon the year's best children's book published in the UK Basque, Catalan and Italian translations of the book were published in 2008, followed by versions in Dutch, French, German, Slovenian, Spanish, and Norwegian.

Her critically acclaimed second novel, Broken Soup, published in January 2008, was shortlisted for the 2008 Waterstone's Children's Book Prize and the 2008 Costa Book Children's Book Award, and longlisted for the 2008 Booktrust Teenage Prize. By 2010, it had also been published in Dutch and German-language translations.

"Ten Stations", a short-story prequel to Finding Violet Park, was included among 2009 World Book Day publications. That year Valentine also inaugurated a series of short stories for young children entitled Iggy and Me.

Valentine's third novel, The Ant Colony, was published in 2009. By 2011, it had been published in Dutch and in German translations.

Her fourth novel, The Double Life of Cassiel Roadnight, was set in her home town of Hay-on-Wye. It was also her fourth novel nominated for the Carnegie Medal, i. e. it was one of the year's top forty children's books published in the UK, in the estimation of librarians. By 2011, it had also been published in Dutch.

Valentine takes part annually in the Hay Festival.

== Works ==
Year	Title	Publisher	Annual awards
2007	Finding Violet Park (US) Me, the Missing, and the Dead	HarperCollins	2007 Guardian Children's Fiction Prize; Carnegie Medal shortlist; Manchester Book Award longlist
2008	Broken Soup	HarperCollins	Waterstone's Children's Book Prize shortlist; Costa Book Children's Book Award shortlist; Booktrust Teenage Prize longlist; Manchester Book Award longlist
2009	Ten Stations (short story)	UK World Book Day	
2009	The Ant Colony		
2009	Iggy & Me (short story series)	HarperCollins	
2010	The Double Life of Cassiel Roadnight	HarperCollins	
2010	Doppelganger	HarperCollins	
2010	Iggy & me (#1)	HarperCollins	
2010	Iggy & me: The happy birthday (#2)	HarperCollins	
2010	Iggy & me on holiday (#3)	HarperCollins	
2011	Iggy & me and the baby (#4)	HarperCollins	
2015	Fire Colour One	HarperCollins	
2020	Hello Now	Harper Fire	
2021	A Girl Called Joy (#1)	Simon & Schuster Children's UK	
2021	Love From Joy (#2)	Simon & Schuster Children's UK	
2022	Planet Joy (#3)	Simon & Schuster Children's UK	
2024	Us in the Before and After	Simon & Schuster Children's UK	Carnegie Medal for Writing longlist
2025	The Unfamous Diaries of Daisy Brewster: The Frenemies (Volume 1)	Simon & Schuster Children's UK	
