= Broken Soup =

2008 children's novel by Jenny Valentine

- First edition
- Author: Jenny Valentine
- Language: English
- Genre: Children's
- Publisher: HarperCollins Children's Books
- Publication date: 7 January 2009
- Publication place: United Kingdom
- Pages: 256 pp
- ISBN: 978-0-00-722965-9
- OCLC: 173238587

Broken Soup is a 2008 children's novel by Jenny Valentine. It was shortlisted for the 2008 Waterstones Children's Book Prize and the 2008 Costa Book Children's Book Award, and longlisted for the 2008 Booktrust Teenage Prize. It has also been longlisted for the 2009 Manchester Book Award and nominated for the 2009 Carnegie Medal.

The Daily Telegraph described the book as "a gripping, humorous story". It was given two separate reviews by The Times: Nicolette Jones called it "a life-affirming, witty, romantic read", while Amanda Craig said that Rowan is "a heroine you warm to because of her perceptiveness and total lack of self-pity in a devastating situation." Eleanor Updale, writing in The Guardian, proclaimed it to be "one of this year's unmissable reads", adding that "the writing moves with an athletic spring."

== Plot ==
Rowan copes with the death of her older brother and takes on a lot responsibilities. After her father leaves, abandoning the family, and her mother slips into a depression, Rowan must take care of her little sister, Stroma, as well as the house. Through the pain of losing her older brother and through the stress of inheriting these new responsibilities, Rowan becomes closer to a classmate of hers and discovers just how little she knew about her older brother (Contemporary Authors Online, 2009). This new relationship with Harper begins when he hands Rowan a negative of a photograph that he claimed she had dropped. Although Rowan knows that the photo negative is not hers, she is too preoccupied with her troubled home life and takes it anyway without thinking it would lead her to a different life. Rowan also develops a relationship with a girl, Bee, who saw Harper hand Rowan the negative and questioned her about it (Jones, 2008). Bee's relationship with Rowan is more complicated than the reader would originally guess. A plot twist reveals a few secrets about Bee involving Rowan's dead brother, Jack, as they two work together to develop the negative and solve the mystery. Rowan finds out that Bee's 2-year-old brother is actually a child Bee had with Jack (Patti). Rowan begins to rely heavily on Bee and Harper when dealing with her rough home life, especially when her mom tries to commit suicide (Kirkus, 2009). The novel's theme, set by Jenny Valentine, is "developing". The book follows Rowan as she develops new relationships and a new family (Kraus, 2009)

== Characters ==
Rowan, the main character, is presented as being very mature for her age. Dealing with so much grief, Rowan had no choice but to grow up and act older than just 15 years old. Rowan's maturity is reflected in the text of the novel as the story unfolds, told through her voice. Her little sister, Stroma, is a ball of energy. She is dependent on Rowan and looks up to her greatly as a maternal figure in the absence of the care of their real mother. We learn about the late brother, Jack, when the characters reminisce about him. Harper is a mysterious, yet intriguing character. He befriends Rowan and acts as her "boyfriend" through all of her turmoil. His role as the love interest suits him well. Bee, whom Rowan also quickly befriends, is much like Rowan; she was forced to grow up when she became a teenage mother. She is mature and has the same curious intuition that Rowan possesses.
