= Sparks (Kennen novel) =

2010 novel by Ally Kennen

- First edition cover
- Author: Ally Kennen
- Language: English
- Publisher: Marion Lloyd Books
- Publication date: 4 April 2010
- Publication place: United Kingdom
- Pages: 240 pp
- ISBN: 978-1-4071-1108-7
- OCLC: 501398051
- Preceded by: Bedlam
- Followed by: Quarry

Sparks is a novel by Ally Kennen, that was published on 4 April 2010. It was longlisted for the Guardian Children's Fiction Prize.

== Plot ==
When Carla's Grandfather dies, she's very sad. But then, she finds a secret letter by her Grandpa and decides to give him the end he had always wanted, a Viking-funeral, in which he would be put on a burning boat heading to the sea. Carla and her siblings start a crazy and dangerous race against the time to do the impossible.
