= Jacob's Ladder (Keaney novel) =

2005 novel by Brian Keaney

- First edition cover
- Author: Brian Keaney
- Language: English
- Genre: Teen fiction
- Publisher: Orchard Books
- Publication date: 2005
- Publication place: London
- Media type: Print (hardback)
- Pages: 205
- ISBN: 9781843627203
- OCLC: 861942501

Jacob's Ladder is a 2005 young adult novel by British author Brian Keaney. It follows the protagonist Jacob through his struggles to escape from another world without memories of his past.

== Plot summary ==
The story begins as the protagonist, Jacob awakes in a field with no memory of who he is. His only clue is his name, and the fact that his clothes are covered with brown stains. From here Jacob is led by a man called Virgil to a place called Locus. Locus initially resembles a school because of the number of children, but the children do not attend classes, and instead pick stones in the 'picking fields'. Here Jacob meets a girl named Aysha, and a boy called Toby, both of whom become his friends. After a series of visions, Jacob comes to the realisation that he has died, and Locus is the 'next world' to which he has been sent.

Together Toby, Aysha and Jacob set out from Locus, taking a small amount of provisions with them. They walk for a day or so, eating some of their food before waking up to find that the rest had turned into ash. They came across a woman (Nemain) washing brown-stained clothes in a river they had drunk from. After lodging with the woman for a day, they fled when the woman complained about the stained clothes, saying: "How am I supposed to get all the blood off these clothes?". While they fled, they met a group of nomadic people, called the Dedanim. The Dedanim, who have strong biblical connotations (See: Dedan) invited Jacob and co. to stay with them. However, after a few nights, Jacob feels that he is losing sight of his goal, and leaves, followed by Aysha and Toby. At this moment they wake up to find that the Dedanim had disappeared and they were lying where they had been before. They travelled on and were split up after being chased by wild dogs. Jacob is cut off from the group, and meets an elderly man named Moloch (Another religious name, see: Moloch), who lives in a cave. Jacob slowly figures out that Moloch is a cannibal, but finds out too late, for he was promptly trapped in Moloch's cave.

As Moloch starts a fire to smoke Jacob to death, Jacob finds a small passageway at the back of the cave. He proceeds to crawl his way towards the end of the tunnel, which ended in a very high ladder. The ladder (which the novel is presumably named after) is Brian Keaney's representation of the Biblical Jacob's Ladder. After Jacob struggles to the top of the ladder (momentarily contemplating giving up), and comes across a white palace in the desert. He is briefly united with Aysha and Toby before they individually meet the ruler of Locus. The 'ruler' is a being bearing the face of an old man and a beautiful woman. It loosely resembles the Roman myth about Janus in the way it guards a gate back to the 'normal' world. Its dual-personality (pessimistic and optimistic) also echo Janus's myth.

== Publication ==
Jacob's Ladder was first published in the UK by Orchard Books in 2005. It was also published in the US by Candlewick Press in 2007. The novel has been translated into Polish and Welsh.

== Reception ==
Publishers Weekly called the story "poignant and puzzling" and noted its sense of melancholy, concluding, "The climax elegantly answers all questions, making this ghost story more satisfying than most." Kirkus Reviews wrote that the "adventure starts off strong but dwindles to didactic metaphor" which it called an "oversimplified Pilgrim's Progress". April Spisak, writing for The Bulletin of the Center for Children's Books, commended the "richly developed" setting of Locus as a place for Jacob to explore his "vulnerabilities and mortality", but criticized his ensuing journey for including "confusing villains, poorly described environments, and a few too many convenient escapes". Spisak, however, concluded her review by saying, "Nevertheless, Keaney has captured an afterlife milieu that is memorable, a feat considering the recent spate of fantasies about various heavens, hells, and beyonds."

== Awards ==
Jacob's Ladder won the Havering 'Best of the Best Award' for teenage fiction, and was shortlisted for South Lanarkshire book award, Calderdale Children's Book Award and the Warwickshire children's book awards.
