= Christine Morton-Shaw =

British writer of children's books

Christine Morton-Shaw (born 1957) is a British writer of children's books and books for teens. These include picture books and educational and novelty titles (most notably the popular 'Stringalongs' series). She is perhaps best known for her more recent work as a Young Adult and Middle-Grade novelist. Her novels to date are The Riddles of Epsilon (which received, among other praise, the VOYA (Voice of Youth Advocates) 'perfect ten' rating in June 2006) and The Hunt for the Seventh. Her works are notable for their spooky atmosphere, an emphasis on mystery and the solving of clues (often in the form of puzzles) and surprising plot twists (or 'paradigm shifts')

== Background ==
Christine Morton-Shaw grew up in Blackburn, England where she reportedly had several spooky or supernatural experiences. She later moved to Sheffield, England to study at university, later gaining a master's degree (MA) in Creative Writing from Sheffield Hallam University. Before this, she had already had several children's picturebooks published, starting with her debut The Pig that Barked (illustrated by Angie Sage, who shares Morton-Shaw's agent and publisher).

After success with several picture book titles, Morton-Shaw's career took a turn in 2003, when she signed a publishing deal for the teenage fantasy novel The Riddles of Epsilon with HarperCollins Children's Books UK and US arms. The book, published by the Katherine Tegen imprint in 2005 received much pre-publication hype. A sequel was published in 2008.

== Work for younger children ==
Morton-Shaw's books for younger children include the following:

- The 'Stringalongs' series (as Christine Morton)
- The Pig that Barked (as Christine Morton)
- Don't Worry William (as Christine Morton)
- Picnic Farm (as Christine Morton)
- Run, Rabbit, Run (as Christine Morton)
- Itzy Bitzy House
- Magoosy
- Mr Jack: a little dog in a big hurry
- Wake Up, Sleepy Bear
- Bears for Bedtime Storybook Collection (with Joan Stimson)

Morton-Shaw has received prizes and honours for her work in this area. Picnic Farm was awarded the Silver Honors by the Parents Choice Foundation, while Wake Up, Sleepy Bear is among the books chosen by the Dollywood Foundation for use in promoting reading among children. Run Rabbit, Run was awarded best children's illustrated work for four- to eleven-year-olds by the English association (2001).

== Works for older children and teens ==
- The Riddles of Epsilon (2005, Katherine Teen Books)
- The Hunt for the Seventh (2008, Katherine Teen Books)

== Personal life ==
Morton-Shaw is married with six children.
