= The Riddles of Epsilon =

Young adult fantasy novel by Christine Morton-Shaw

- First edition (US)
- Author: Christine Morton-Shaw
- Publisher: HarperTeen
- Publication date: 2005
- ISBN: 9780060728199

The Riddles of Epsilon is a young adult fantasy novel by the British author Christine Morton-Shaw. It was first published in the USA by the Katherine Teegan imprint of Harper Collins publishers (April, 2005). It later appeared in the UK (October, 2005) and Italy (February, 2006).

== Themes ==
The novel deals with the ideas of good and evil found in most fantasy fiction, whilst also blurring the lines between the two and asking questions about whether evil is easy to identify. Family discord and the importance of family is another key theme, as is the importance of courage. The novel also has a preoccupation with the passage and nature of time.

== Critical reception ==
The Riddles of Epsilon received many positive reviews on its publication in 2005. The Voice of Youth Advocates (VOYA) rated the novel as a "perfect ten" for both literary quality and "teen appeal". VOYA said of Epsilon, "this novel rises above cliché, shining through well-developed and intriguing characters, a tangible atmosphere and heart-stopping pacing." The novel was also longlisted in the UK for the Manchester Children's book awards. Those reviews criticising elements of the novel have tended to focus on its dark atmosphere, complicated plot development and the use of a diary device through which to tell the story.
