= Sebastian Darke =

Hero of a series of children's novels by Philip Caveney

Sebastian Darke is the eponymous hero of a series of children's novels written by British author Philip Caveney.

== The novels ==
- Sebastian Darke: Prince of Fools, was first published in the UK in January 2007.
- Sebastian Darke: Prince of Pirates, was published in February 2008.
- Sebastian Darke: Prince of Explorers, was published in 2009.
- A Buffalope's Tale, published 2010.

== Spin-offs ==
A Buffalope's Tale, a fantasy novel by Philip Caveney, is a spin-off in the Sebastian Darke series. The official Sebastian Darke website includes the first chapter, entitled The Great Migration.
