= Brian Keaney =

British author

- Born: 1954 (age 71–72); Walthamstow, Essex, England
- Education: University of Liverpool
- Occupation: Author
- Children: 2
- Writing career
- Period: 1986–present
- Genres: Children's books, fantasy, historical fiction, non-fiction, science fiction and teen fiction
- Website: www.briankeaney.com

Brian Keaney (born 1954) is a British author. He is an author of mainly young adult fiction, who currently resides in London where he continues work as an author.

== Early life and career ==
Brian Keaney was born in Walthamstow, Essex, to Irish Catholic parents. He reported that he learned about narrative by listening to his mother who was a natural storyteller.

He attended a Catholic primary school in London which was run by nuns and a secondary school run by Jesuits. He did not enjoy his schooldays and reported that some teachers at his secondary school were overly fond of administering corporal punishment. His favorite academic subject was English, although he also had an interest in History and Latin, particularly liking Latin poetry.

Keaney eventually pursued a career as an English teacher. A librarian at a school he was working at introduced him to young adult fiction, piquing his interest so that he decided to write his own.

== Personal life ==
Keaney currently lives in London with his wife. He has two grown up daughters.

== Writing bibliography ==
=== Fiction ===
- Don't Hang About (1986)
- Some People Never Learn (1986)
- No Need for Heroes (1989)
- If This Is the Real World (1991)
- Limited Damage (1991)
- Boys Don't Write Love Stories (1993)
- Family Secrets (1997)
- The Private Life of Georgia Brown (1998)
- Bitter Fruit (1999)
- Balloon House (2000)
- Falling for Joshua (2001)
- No Stone Unturned (2001)
- Where Mermaids Sing (2004)
- Jacob's Ladder (2005)
- The Alphabet of Heart's Desire (2017)

Promises of Dr. Sigmundus

- The Hollow People (2006)
- The Gallow Glass/The Cracked Mirror (2007)
- The Mendini Canticle/The Resurrection Fields (2008)

Nathaniel Wolfe

- The Haunting of Nathaniel Wolfe (2008)
- Nathaniel Wolfe and the Body Snatchers (2009)

The Magical Detective Agency

- The Magical Detectives (2011)
- The Magical Detectives and the Forbidden Spell (2011)

=== Non-fiction ===
- Making Sense of English (1987)
- Talking Sense (1987)
- Sharing Experience (1991)
- Taking Shape (1991)
- Presenting Ideas (1992)
- English in the School Grounds (1993)
- The Way to Pass National Curriculum English: The Easy Way to Learn And Revise: 11-13 Years Level 5 (1994) (with Carol Vorderman)
- Arts in the School Grounds (1996)

=== Plays ===
- A Kiss from France (1990)
- Boycott (1991)
- Between Two Shores (1991)

=== Picture books ===
- Only Made of Wood (1998)
- That's What Friends Are For (2003)
