= Lucy Adlington =

British textile historian and author (born 1970)

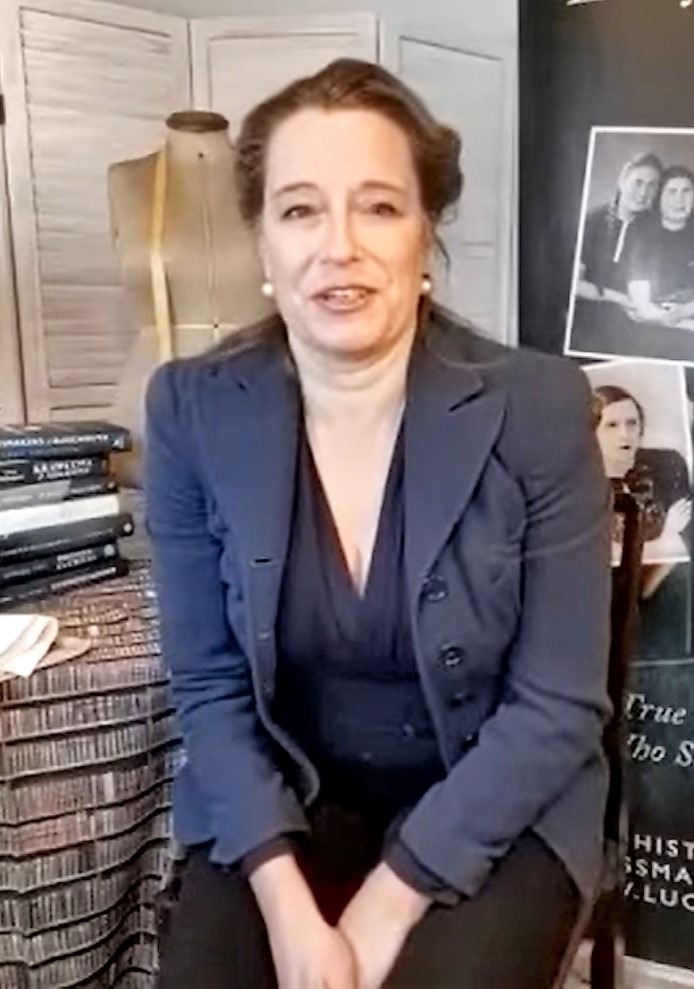
Adlington speaks about The Dressmakers of Auschwitz in 2023

Lucy J. Adlington (born 1970) is a British social and textile historian, collector of vintage clothing, and author. Many of her books examine women's lives and fashion during the Second World War and the Holocaust. The Dressmakers of Auschwitz: The True Story of the Women Who Sewed to Survive has been translated into 22 languages and listed on The New York Times Best Seller list. Adlington also writes young adult fiction. Her YA work typically delves into themes of historical fiction, fantasy, and adventurous storytelling. The Red Ribbon was shortlisted for a "Young Quills Award" in the 14 to young adult category in 2018.

== Early life and education ==
Adlington was born in 1970 in London. She has a bachelor's degree from Clare College, Cambridge. She has a master's in medieval studies from the University of York. She researched women's lives and their clothes from the Second World War in detail. As a social and textile historian, Adlington is also interested in the evolution of clothing.

== Clothing collection ==
Adlington is the founder of History Wardrobe, a company that specializes in historical costumes. In 2023 the Bankfield Museum in Halifax, England, hosted an exhibition of Adlington's collection of vintage dresses and school uniforms. She has appeared on BBC Radio's Woman's Hour to discuss the history of underwear.

== Books ==
Through her writing, Adlington examines women's lives and the importance of clothing. Stitches in Time: The Story of the Clothes We Wear (2015) examines the evolution of clothing. Several of Adlington's books focus on the Second World War and the Holocaust. Great War Fashion: Tales from the History Wardrobe (2013) describes the impact of the war on the women's labour market. Women lost jobs in the 'luxury' trades of dressmaking and millinery, and were faced with harder work and longer hours in unregulated workshops that made clothing and equipment for soldiers. Women's Lives and Clothes in WW2: Ready for Action is credited with filling "a gap in the scholarship on women's clothing and service during the war". In it, Adlington focuses on the women who wore the clothing and their experiences, and emphasizes the similarities between nationalities.

The Dressmakers of Auschwitz (2021) centres on the subject of clothes, seamstresses, and hardships faced by female internees in concentration camps. It is a factual account of women who worked as seamstresses in the Auschwitz concentration camp. The Nazi commandant's wife, Hedwig Höss, used female prisoners as workers in a fashion salon known as the "Obere Nähstube", or "upper tailoring studio". Marta Fuchs, Berta Berkovich Kohut and other young women survived Auschwitz by designing and tailoring high-fashion clothing for elite Nazi women. After Adlington published a fictional account, The Red Ribbon (2017), descendants of some of the dressmakers contacted her with more information about the women who had worked in the camp. The Dressmakers of Auschwitz has been translated into 22 languages and recorded on The New York Times Best Seller list.

Adlington has written several young adult novels, including The Red Ribbon (2017), a fictional story about a woman named Ella who was a seamstress in a concentration camp during the Holocaust in the Second World War. The book was shortlisted for a "Young Quills Award" in the 14 to young adult category in 2018. Her work has earned recognition through nominations and shortlistings for awards including the Carnegie Medal, Manchester Book Prize, Leeds Book Prize, and Rotherham Book Award, for her books The Diary of Pelly-D and Burning Mountain.

=== Nonfiction ===
- Great War Fashion: Tales from the History Wardrobe (2013, ISBN 978-0-7509-5677-2)
- Stitches in Time: The Story of the Clothes We Wear (2015, ISBN 978-1-84794-726-0)
- Women's Lives and Clothes in WW2: Ready for Action (2019)
- The Dressmakers of Auschwitz: The True Story of the Women Who Sewed to Survive (2021)

=== Young adult fiction ===
- The Diary of Pelly D (2005)
- Cherry Heaven (2007)
- The Glittering Eye (2009)
- Burning Mountain (2010)
- Night Witches (2013, ISBN 978-1-4449-0431-4)
- The Red Ribbon (2017)
- Summerland (2019)

== See also ==
- A. & L. Tirocchi Gowns
- Ilse Weber, Jewish poet
- Eva Mozes Kor, American survivor of the Holocaust
- Bat-Sheva Dagan, Polish holocaust survivor
