= Beast (Kennen novel) =

2006 young adult novel by Ally Kennen

- First edition cover
- Author: Ally Kennen
- Language: English
- Genre: Young adult literature
- Publisher: Marion Lloyd Books
- Publication date: 29 June 2006
- Publication place: United Kingdom
- Pages: 256 pp
- ISBN: 978-0-439-95104-3
- OCLC: 67870796
- Followed by: Berserk

Beast is a 2006 young adult novel by Ally Kennen. It won the 2007 Manchester Book Award, and was shortlisted for the 2006 Booktrust Teenage Prize, the 2007 Carnegie Medal and the 2007 Branford Boase Award.

== Plot ==
Stephen is a 17-year-old foster child living on the edge of the law. He has moved from family to family, all the time guarding a great secret. He harbors a huge crocodilean beast, ferocious from birth, bequeathed to him by his criminal father when Stephen was a child. Beast tells the story of his murderous intents toward this monster and his growing relationships, as well as frequently reliving his childhood through flashbacks.
