= Jeremy Strong (author) =

British writer (1949–2024)

- Born: Jeremy James Strong; 18 November 1949; New Eltham, London, England
- Died: 4 August 2024 (aged 74)
- Occupations: Writer, teacher
- Spouse: Gillie Strong
- Children: Daniel and Jessica
- Writing career
- Period: 1978–2024
- Genre: Children's literature
- Website: jeremystrong.co.uk

Jeremy James Strong (18 November 1949 – 4 August 2024) was an English writer known for his children's books. Strong wrote and published over 100 novels for children and young adults and is best known for his children's series The Hundred-Mile-an-Hour Dog. His work were known for humour, wordplay and has been described as encouraging "reading amongst ordinary children." Strong won the Children's Book award in 1997 and his books have been adapted for television including the BBC's There's a Viking in My Bed.

== Early life and career ==
Jeremy James Strong was born in New Eltham in London on 18 November 1949. His parents were Charles Strong, a pharmacist and Una, a primary school teacher and he has two brothers, Michael and Aidan and a sister, Jenny. He attended Wyborne Primary School, east London, Haberdashers Aske's Boys' School and the University of York where he first studied music before changing courses to English.

After he graduated university, he became a primary school teacher whilst still pursuing his ambition to become a writer. His first teaching position was at Sevenoaks, Kent in 1976. He became deputy head teacher at Birchwood primary and then headteacher of Culverstone Green primary. Strong published his first book Smith's Tail, a picture story for young children in 1978. Strong left teaching in 1991 and wrote full-time for the rest of his life.

== Accolades ==
Jeremy Strong won the Children's Book Award (UK) (previously the Red House Children's Book Award) in 1997 for The Hundred-Mile-An-Hour Dog. He won the Sheffield Children's Book Award for Short Novel in 1998 for Pirate Pandemonium and then in 2001 for Living with Vampires.

== Works ==
Jeremy Strong is the author of more than 100 books for young children, and he had a special interest in encouraging children to become independent readers. He also wrote books for teens and non-fiction.

=== Children's novels ===
==== The Hundred-Mile-An-Hour Dog ====
Year	Title	Notes
1996	The Hundred-Mile-An-Hour Dog	
2007	Return of the Hundred-Mile-An-Hour Dog	
2008	Lost! The Hundred-Mile-An-Hour Dog	
2009	Wanted! The Hundred-Mile-An-Hour Dog	
2012	The Hundred-Mile-An-Hour Dog Goes for Gold!	
2013	Christmas Chaos for the Hundred-Mile-An-Hour Dog	
2014	Kidnapped! The Hundred-Mile-An-Hour Dog's Sizzling Summer	
2016	The Hundred-Mile-An-Hour Dog: Master of Disguise	

==== Viking series ====
Year	Title	Notes
1995	Viking in Trouble	
1998	Viking at School	
2009	There's a Viking in My Bed	

==== Pirate School ====
Year	Title	Notes
2002	Pirate School: Just a bit of Wind	
2003	Pirate School: The Birthday Bash	
2004	Pirate School: Where's the Dog?	
2005	Pirate School: The Bun Gun	
2007	Pirate School: A Very Fishy Battle	

==== Pharaoh series ====
Year	Title	Notes
2004	Let's Do the Pharaoh!	
2009	There's a Pharaoh in our Bath!	

==== My Brother's Famous Bottom series ====
Year	Title	Notes
2007	My Brother's Famous Bottom	
2007	My Brother's Famous Bottom Gets Pinched	
2008	My Brother's Famous Bottom Goes Camping	
2008	My Brother's Famous Bottom Goes Camping	
2009	My Brother's Hot Cross Bottom	
2010	My Brother's Christmas Bottom - Unwrapped!	
2013	My Brother's Famous Bottom Gets Crowned!	
2015	My Brother's Famous Bottom Takes Off!	
2017	My Brother's Famous Bottom Makes a Splash!	

==== The Indoor Pirates series ====
Year	Title	Notes
2009	The Indoor Pirates	
2009	The Indoor Pirates on Treasure Island	

==== Cartoon Kid series ====
Year	Title	Notes
2011	Cartoon Kid	
2011	Cartoon Kid - Supercharged!	
2012	Cartoon Kid Strikes Back!	
2012	Cartoon Kid - Emergency!	
2013	Cartoon Kid - Zombies!	

==== Romans on the Rampage ====
Year	Title	Notes
2015	Romans on the Rampage	
2016	Romans on the Rampage: Jail Break	
2017	Romans on the Rampage: Chariot Champions!	

- Giant Jim and the Hurricane (1998)
- Dinosaur Pox (1999)
- I'm Telling You, They're Aliens! (2000)
- The Shocking Adventures of Lightning Lucy (2002)
- The Beak Speaks (2003)
- My Mum's Going to Explode! (2007)
- My Granny's Great Escape (2007)
- My Dad's Got an Alligator! (2007)
- Krazy-Kow Saves the World - Well, Almost (2007)
- Chicken School (2007)
- Beware! Killer Tomatoes (2007)
- Weird (2008)
- The Battle for Christmas (2008)
- Invasion of the Christmas Puddings (2008)
- Krankenstein's Crazy House of Horror (2009)
- We Want to be on the Telly! (2010)
- Doctor Bonkers! (2010)
- Batpants! (2010)
- Batpants and the Vanishing Elephant (2011)

His humorous writing often makes use of his childhood and primary teaching experiences. His story There's A Viking In My Bed was made into a BBC children's TV series and he has won several awards including the prestigious "Children's Book Award 1997" for The Hundred Mile an Hour Dog, the "Manchester Book Award" for his teen novel Stuff and the "Sheffield Book Award" for Beware, Killer Tomatoes.

Strong's final novel, Fox Goes North was published posthumously by Scholastic in October 2024. The story tells of a band of animal companions who travel northwards in a topsy-turvey caravan on their quest to see the Northern Lights. For the elderly fox, it will be her final journey. In an interview with Nikki Gamble, Strong said that as he was writing the story, he became aware that he was writing the story of his own journey too.

== Personal life ==
Strong married his first wife Susan Noot, a teacher, in 1973 and they had two children together, Daniel and Jessica. They divorced and in 2006 Strong met Gillian Dean and they married two years later. Strong has two stepdaughters, from his second marriage, Rosa and Isabel. He lived in Bradford-on-Avon, with his wife and their two cats and four hens.

Strong died from bone cancer on 4 August 2024. He was 74 years old.
