= Catherine MacPhail =

British author (1946–2021)

- Born: 25 January 1946; Greenock
- Died: 28 August 2021 (aged 75)
- Writing career
- Genre: children's literature
- Notable works: Run, Zan, Run
- Notable awards: Kathleen Fidler Award

Catherine MacPhail (25 January 1946 – 28 August 2021) was a Scottish-born author.

== Life ==
MacPail was born and brought up in Greenock in 1946.

She always wanted to be a writer but she did not think she would be suited to it. Her first published work was a sort of "twist-in-the-tale" story in Tit-Bits, followed by a story in The Sunday Post. After she won a romantic story competition in Woman's Weekly, she decided to concentrate on romantic novels, but after writing two, she decided that it was not right for her. In addition to writing books for children around their teens, she also wrote for adults. She is the author of the BBC Radio 2 series My Mammy and Me. She has received the Scottish Children's Book Award three times.

== Personal life ==
MacPhail was married. She had three children, one named Katie, who was the inspiration from her first book. MacPhail said that she would write for free, but she enjoyed being paid for it. On her website, it says that as a child she asked "Do you know what an eejit is? Someone who is one sandwich short of a picnic … whose lift doesn't go … well, you know what I mean. Eejit is a wonderful Scottish/Irish word that seemed to sum me up perfectly when I was growing up." (Eejit is a Scottish/Irish word for someone idiotic or simple.) "I was always trying to change my image. Act sophisticated, grown up, sensible… and then a story would just plop into my mind and BANG! There I'd go, smack into another fence post."

MacPhail grew up with three sisters and a widowed mother, her father having died when she was two. She claimed that her childhood was "full of fun, even though it must have been so hard for my mum. Me and my sisters knew nothing of the hardship she must have had. My mother was always reading books and was never away from the library". She wrote in her website she can always remember thinking what a wonderful place it was, where one could walk out with a stack full of books and did not even pay for them! "It was my mum who gave me my love of reading."

"Yet, my own background, my home town, have been the inspiration for most of my writing. A comedy series called My Mammy and Me, another one called We Gotta Get Outta This Place. Set in Greenock, inspired by my own experiences. And my first book, the book that changed my life, Run Zan Run, based on what happened to my own daughter Katie, in Greenock. A tip, if you want to be a writer, don't ever think nothing ever happens to you, because your own life is so interesting, if you just think about it. My only regret? I wish I had started sooner. But once I'd started? There was no stopping me."

== Career ==
MacPhail's first children's novel was Run, Zan, Run. It was inspired by her youngest daughter, Mia, who was being bullied at school. She wanted to raise awareness of how little help is available to children who are being bullied. Run, Zan, Run was the winner of the 1994 Kathleen Fidler Award for new Scottish Writing. Her next book was entitled Fighting Back, and was about loan-sharks. Fighting Back won one of the first Scottish Arts Council Children's Book Awards in 1999 . This was followed by the novel Fugitive.

She wrote a series of four books entitled Nemesis, which concluded in May 2008.

In 2015 she won the Scottish Children's Book Award for Mosi's War. She had won the award twice before. X won in 2006 and in 2010 she had the award for Grass

== Novels ==
The following are noted on Fantastic Fiction.

- Run, Zan, Run (1994)
- Fighting Back (1998)
- Fugitive (1999)
- Missing (2000)
- A Kind of Magic (2001)
- Bad Company (2001)
- Dark Waters (2003)
- Picking on Percy (2003)
- Wheels (2003)
- Another Me (2003) – adapted into a 2013 movie
- Get That Ghost to Go! (2003)
- Catch Us If You Can (2004)
- Tribes (2004)
- Underworld (2004)
- Sticks and Stones (2005)
- Roxy's Baby (2005)
- Traitors' Gate (2005)
- Get That Ghost to Go Too (2006)
- Dead Man's Close (2006)
- Under the Skin (2007)
- Worse Than Boys (2007)
- Hide and Seek (2009)
- Grass (2009)
- Out of the Depths (2011)
- Point Danger (2012)
- Annie's Choice (2014)
- Stars Shall Be Bright (2015)
- The Evil Within (2017)
- White Feather (2018) (with David MacPhail)
- Jack in Goal (2019) (with Mike Phillips)
- Jenny's Choice (2019)

=== Series ===
==== Granny Nothing ====
1. Granny Nothing (2003)
2. Granny Nothing and the Shrunken Head (2003)
3. Granny Nothing and the Rusty Key (2004)
4. Granny Nothing and the Secret Weapon (2004)
5. Granny Nothing (2009) reprinted by Strident Publishing with new artwork
6. Granny Nothing (2012) reprinted by Strident Publishing Limited with new artwork

==== Nemesis ====
1. Into the Shadows (2006)
2. The Beast Within (2007)
3. Sinister Intent (2007)
4. Ride of Death (2008)
