= Louise Arnold (writer) =

English writer

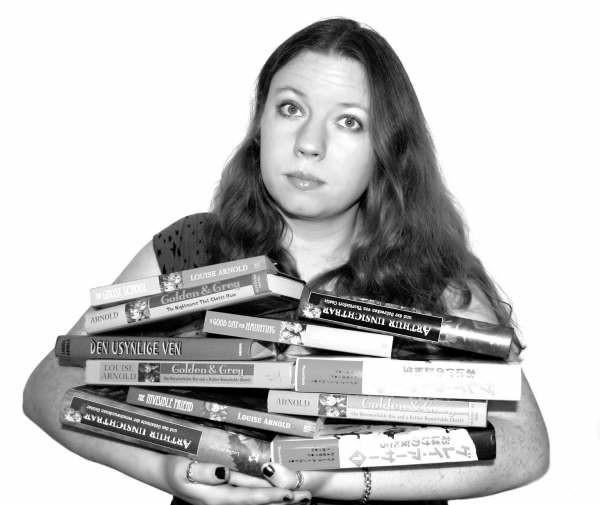
- Born: Louise Arnold; Morden, Surrey
- Education: University of Kent
- Writing career
- Notable works: Golden & Grey (An Unremarkable Boy and a Rather Remarkable Ghost) (2005); Golden & Grey: The Nightmares That Ghosts Have (2006); Golden & Grey: A Good Day for Haunting (2008)

Louise Arnold is an English writer of children's literature. Her published works to date include the Grey Arthur series of novels.

== Early life and education ==
Arnold was born in Morden, Surrey. She wrote her first poem aged four, and lived in Bognor Regis until she passed her A-Level exams. She graduated from the University of Kent in 2003 with a 2.1 in drama. While studying there, she was diagnosed with dyslexia.

== Career ==
In 2003 the BBC News website launched a competition to find "The next J. K. Rowling". Entrants were invited to submit the first paragraph of a children's book. A selection of these was then put to an online public vote, which Arnold subsequently won with her entry, entitled "A not very frightening ghost". She was signed by an agent, Kate Jones, which then led to a publishing deal, with her first novel The Invisible Friend being released in 2005.

"I was contacted by an agent and had to go for meetings which was very daunting because the industry was all new to me and I had little clue how it all worked...But I got lucky with the people I met and I realise how lucky I am to have this opportunity."

"I was given a deadline of a year to write the book, which I delivered on time. I'm a bit of daydreamer so I needed that deadline to get me down to working."

== Personal life ==
She now lives in Canterbury, Kent.

== Published works ==
- Golden & Grey (An Unremarkable Boy and a Rather Remarkable Ghost) (2005)
- Golden & Grey: The Nightmares That Ghosts Have (2006)
- Golden & Grey: A Good Day for Haunting (2008)

In England, the title instead of An Unremarkable Boy and a Rather Remarkable Ghost is:

- The Invisible Friend

and the title for The Nightmares That Ghosts Have is:

- The Ghost School
