= Justin Somper =

British children's author

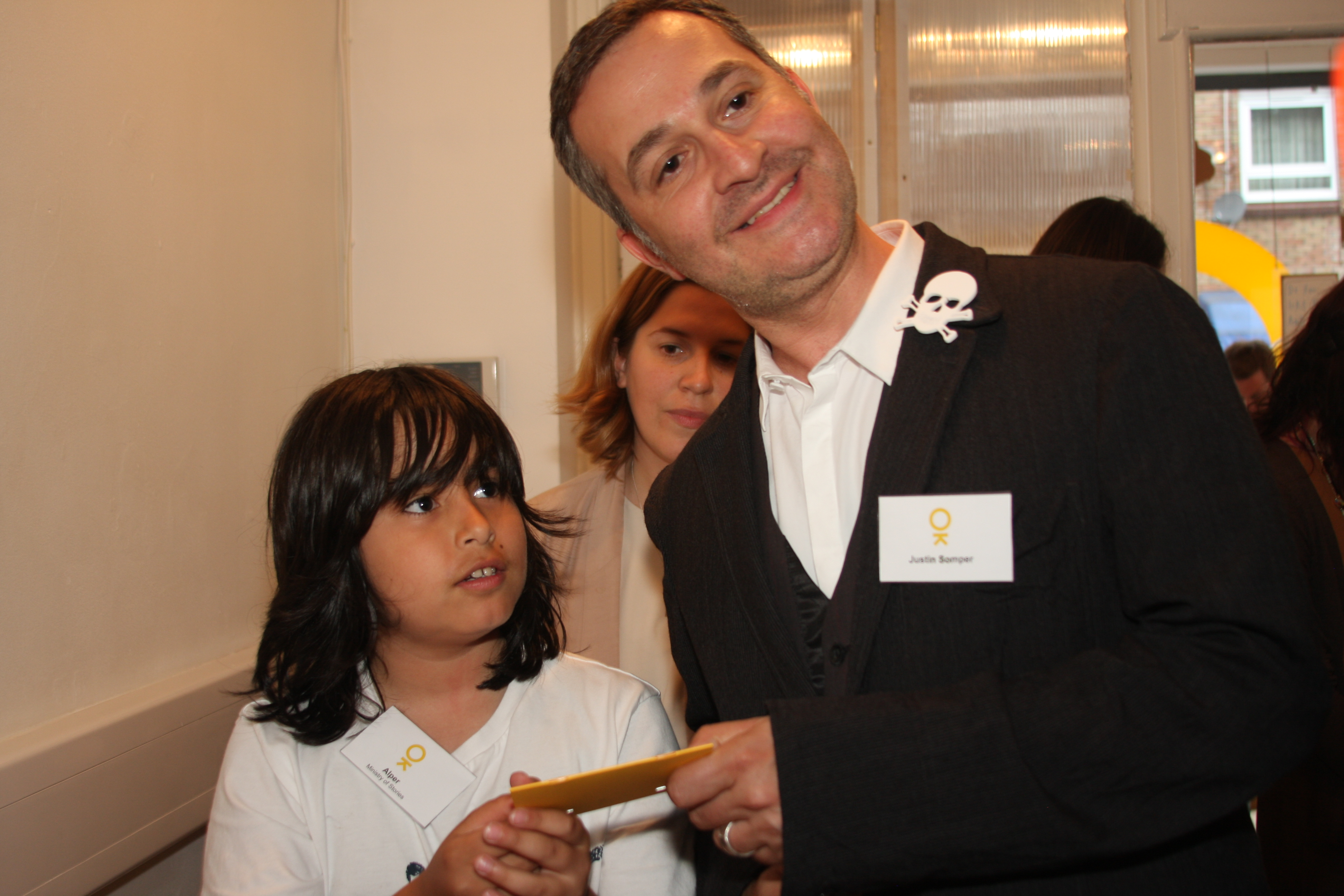
Justin Somper in 2012

Justin Somper is the British author of the Vampirates and the Allies & Assassins children's novel series.

== Biography ==
Somper was born in St Albans, England, and graduated from the University of Warwick. He worked as a publicist before starting his writing career. He has since authored six books in a series called Vampirates and two under the title Allies and Assassins.

== Bibliography ==
=== Vampirates series ===
1. Demons of the Ocean (2005)
2. Tide of Terror (2006)
3. Blood Captain (2008)
4. Black Heart (2009)
5. Empire of Night (2010)
6. Immortal War (2011)
- "Dead Deep" (2007) is a short story created for World Book Day 2007. It is available online.

=== Allies & Assassins series ===
1. Allies & Assassins (2013)
2. A Conspiracy of Princes (2015)
