= Philip Caveney =

British children's author

- Born: 1951 (age 74–75); Prestatyn, North Wales
- Occupation: Novelist
- Writing career
- Notable work: Sebastian Darke trilogy
- Website: philip-caveney.co.uk

Philip Caveney (born 1951) is a British children's author, best known for the Sebastian Darke, Alec Devlin and "Movie Maniacs" novels. He previously wrote a number of thrillers for adults. He was born in Prestatyn, North Wales but for many years lived in Stockport and co-ordinated the Manchester Writers' Workshop for over twenty five years, before moving to Edinburgh.

== Series ==
=== Sebastian Darke ===
The Sebastian Darke books are a fantasy series for children. They recount the adventures of Sebastian Darke, a failed jester, and his companions: Max, a talking (and endlessly complaining) "buffalope" (a huge, shaggy beast of burden), and Captain Cornelius Drummel, a tiny but powerful warrior and leading exponent of the lethal Golmiran Death Leap.

The first book in the series, Sebastian Darke: Prince of Fools was published by Random House Children's Books in 2007 and the second, Sebastian Darke: Prince of Pirates, in 2008. A third title, Sebastian Darke: Prince of Explorers was published in 2009 and in 2010, there was a spin-off recounting Max's life story, A Buffalope's Tale. The final part of the story, [Sebastian Darke: Prince of Spies, was published in 2012.

=== Alec Devlin ===
Alec Devlin: The Eye of the Serpent was published in August 2008 and tells the tale of Alec Devlin, a young archaeologist in 1920s Egypt. The book is a classic adventure novel aimed at the 9+ age group. The sequel Alec Devlin: Empire of the Skull was published in 2009 and the third and final adventure, Maze of Death, was published in 2010.

=== Movie Maniacs ===
Night on Terror Island was published in 2011 by Red Fox Books and tells the story of Kip McCall, a young boy whose father owns a cinema, The Paramount Picture Palace. When mysterious new projectionist Mr. Lazarus comes to work at the cinema, he brings with him his own invention, The Lazarus Enigma, a device which can put people into movies. When you're in there, everything becomes real. The sequel, Spy Another Day, was published in 2012 and a third book, Space Blasters, was released in May 2013.

== Bibliography ==
=== Adult books ===
- 1978 The Sins of Rachel Ellis
- 1985 Tiger, Tiger
- 1985 The Tarantula Stone
- 1993 Speak No Evil
- 1993 Black Wolf
- 1994 Strip Jack Naked
- 1995 Skin Flicks
- 1994 Slayground
- 1996 Burn Down Easy
- 1996 Bad to the Bone
- 1997 1999
- 2000 Love Bites
- 2014 Little Monsters

=== Children's books ===
- 2007 Sebastian Darke: Prince of Fools
- 2008 Sebastian Darke: Prince of Pirates
- 2008 Alec Devlin: The Eye of the Serpent
- 2009 Sebastian Darke: Prince of Explorers
- 2009 Alec Devlin: Empire of the Skull
- 2010 Alec Devlin: Maze of Death
- 2011 Night on Terror Island
- 2012 Sebastian Darke: Prince of Spies
- 2012 The Talent
- 2012 Spy Another Day
- 2012 Crow Boy (Crow Boy Trilogy)
- 2013 Watchers
- 2013 Animal Factory
- 2014 Seventeen Coffins (Crow Boy Trilogy)
- 2015 One for Sorrow (Crow Boy Trilogy)
- 2016 The Calling
- 2017 The Slithers
