= Sophie McKenzie =

British author of books for young adults

- Born: London, England
- Education: City Literary Institute
- Occupation: Author
- Writing career
- Notable work: Girl, Missing
- Website: www.sophiemckenziebooks.com

Sophie McKenzie is a British author of young adult novels as well as adult thrillers. Many of her novels have won several awards, the most famous being Girl, Missing. Others include Blood Ties and The Set Up. McKenzie writes full-time and lives in London. Her books have mainly been published by Simon & Schuster.

== Biography ==
McKenzie grew up in London, and became a journalist after university. After being made redundant from her job in 2003, she started a year long 'Writing for Children course' at the City Literary Institute in London. She finished her first novel, Girl, Missing at the beginning of 2005. It was then published by Simon & Schuster Children's Books in 2006.

== Awards ==
=== Girl, Missing Series ===
==== Girl, Missing ====
- Winner Richard and Judy Book Club Best Kids’ Books 2007 11+
- Winner of the RHCBA 2007 12+
- Winner of the John Lewis Sol hull Book Award 2008
- Winner of the 2008 Sakura Medal Award given by the International School Libraries of Japan

==== Missing Me ====
- Winner of the Ealing Readers Award 2013

=== Blood Ties Series ===
==== Blood Ties ====
- Overall winner of the Red House Children's Book Award 2009
- Winner of the North East Teenage Book Award 2010
- Winner of the Southern Schools Book Award 2010
- Winner of the Warwickshire Book Award 2010
- Winner of the RED Book Award 2010

== Novels ==
=== Young adult fiction ===
- Falling Fast
- Burning Bright
- Casting Shadows
- Defy the Stars
- Truth Or Dare
- Hide & Secrets
- Sweetfreak

==== Second Series ====
- Split Second
- Every Second Counts

==== Missing Series ====
- Girl, Missing
- Sister, Missing
- Missing Me
- Boy Missing

==== The Medusa Project ====
- The Set-Up
- The Hostage
- The Thief
- The Rescue
- Hunted
- Double Crossed
- Hit Squad

==== Blood Series ====
- Blood Ties
- Blood Ransom

==== All About Eve ====
- Six Steps to a Girl
- Three's a Crowd
- The One & Only

=== Crime fiction novels ===
- Je ne t'oublierai pas
- Trust in Me
- Close My Eyes (2013)
- Lessons in Death

=== Other fiction ===
- The Fix
- Time Train to the Blitz
- Arthur's Sword
