= Joe Craig (writer) =

English children's novelist and musician

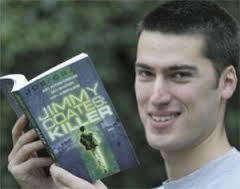
- Born: 1980 or 1981 (age 45–46); Finchley, London, England
- Occupations: Writer, Musician
- Spouse: Mary-Ann Ochota
- Children: 1
- Writing career
- Genres: Spy, Adventure, Thriller, Children's Books
- Notable work: Jimmy Coates series
- Website: joecraig.co.uk

Joe Craig (born 1980 or 1981) is an English children's novelist and musician. He is best known for the Jimmy Coates series of books.

== Early life and education ==
Craig was born and grew up in the Finchley neighbourhood of north London. His mother is a poet and his two sisters are also writers.

He studied philosophy at Emmanuel College, Cambridge, where he wrote and composed music for the Cambridge Footlights.

== Career ==
In 2002, he provided the score for the musical theatre production Told You So: A Musical Hijacking of Aesop's Fables (book and lyrics by John Finnemore).

His first children's book, Jimmy Coates: Killer, was published in 2005. He described the plot as being about "a boy on the run from the secret service, battling Britain’s dictatorship, while resisting his own genetic programming that gives him the instincts and abilities of an assassin". He followed it with six more Jimmy Coates books, and as of 2025, the series had sold over 500,000 copies and been translated into twelve languages.

He regularly performs school visits to encourage reading and promote his books. In 2015, he told The Bookseller that author visits show children that the world of books is "full of life, passion and thrills...My aim with every school event I do is to make my visit the single most memorable event in the school life of every student in the room".

In 2010, Craig released an album of songs which he wrote and performed himself: The Songman & Me, Vol. 1.

== Personal life ==
He met anthropologist and television presenter Mary-Ann Ochota when they attended Cambridge University together; they began dating in 2000 and eventually married. Their son, Cole, was born in July 2018. They live in Highgate, London.

Craig played cricket for the Authors XI team of British writers during the 2012-13 season.

== Books ==
- Jimmy Coates: Killer, HarperCollins Children's Books, March 2005, ISBN 0-00-719685-7

(Released in the United States under the title Jimmy Coates: Assassin.)

- Jimmy Coates: Target, HarperCollins Children's Books, May 2006, ISBN 0-00-719686-5
- Jimmy Coates: Revenge, HarperCollins Children's Books, January 2007, ISBN 0-00-723285-3
- Jimmy Coates: Sabotage, HarperCollins Children's Books, October 2007, ISBN 0-00-723286-1
- Jimmy Coates: Survival, HarperCollins Children's Books, April 2008, ISBN 0-00-727099-2
- Jimmy Coates: Power, HarperCollins Children's Books, October 2008, ISBN 978-0-00-727730-8
- Jimmy Coates: Blackout, HarperCollins Children's Books, June 2013, ISBN 978-0007524327
- Lifters, Franklin Watts, September 2011, ISBN 978-1-4451-0555-0
- World of Robots: Jango, Rising Stars, February 2019, ISBN 978-1510444102
- World of Robots: Wild, Rising Stars, February 2019, ISBN 978-1510444287
- World of Robots: Breakdown, Rising Stars, February 2019, ISBN 978-1510444461
- World of Robots: Hijack, Rising Stars, February 2019, ISBN 978-1510444645
- Odi's Day, OUP Oxford, February 2022, ISBN 978-1382007863
- Quantum Ninja, November 2026, ISBN 978-1-917677-07-3

Short e-books:

- Save the Human, CB Creative Books, December 2014
- Head Strong, CB Creative Books, December 2014
- The Mendack Affair, CB Creative Books, December 2014
- Animal Calamity: The Goldfish of Doom, September 2024

== Discography ==
The Songman & Me, Vol. 1

- Released: 2011
- Format: LP
- Label: Jamasama
- Writer: Joe Craig
- Tracks: "The Travelling Songman", "Underneath the Snow", "Solo Street", "I've Been Holding On", "Romantic Song", "More Than I Do", "Jealousy", "Full Circle", "Faithful Friend", "The Songman Speaks", "Monkey Tree"
