= Vampirates: Demons of the Ocean =

2005 novel by Justin Somper

- First edition (UK)
- Author: Justin Somper
- Cover artist: Bob Lea
- Language: English
- Series: Vampirates
- Genre: Children's; horror; science fantasy
- Published: 2005
- Publisher: Simon & Schuster (UK); Little Brown (US)
- Publication place: United Kingdom
- Media type: Print (paperback & hardback)
- Pages: 304 pp (first edition, paperback)
- ISBN: 0-689-87263-1 (first edition, paperback)
- OCLC: 58828710
- Followed by: Vampirates: Dead Deep

Vampirates: Demons of the Ocean is a children's novel by British author Justin Somper about two young siblings who get separated at sea and are picked up by two very different ships.

== Background ==
Justin Somper first had the idea for the book "five years before and gave up [his] full-time job to pursue it". He notes that "Vampirates is set in the future, although it feels rather like the past." Somper states that in the novel, the character of Grace discovers that the notion of who is the enemy is often defined by one's perspective or by "lack of information, or misinformation".

== Synopsis ==
The year is 2505. The oceans have risen. A new era of piracy is dawning. After their father dies, Connor and Grace Tempest find that there is no place for them to go, so they set out into the sea. A vicious storm separates them, destroying their boat and leaving them fighting for their lives in the cold water. Picked up by one of the more notorious pirate ships, the Diablo, Connor soon finds himself wielding a cutlass. But does he have the stomach to be a pirate? Grace ends up aboard a more mysterious ship of vampire pirates, the Nocturne. As it turns out, most of the vampires are quite nice... except for Sidorio.

== Characters ==
- Connor Tempest – Fourteen-year-old pirate protégé who loves the pirate life; twin brother of Grace Tempest.
- Grace Tempest – Fourteen-year-old who cares deeply for the Vampirates; twin sister of Connor Tempest.
- Lorcan Furey – Rescues Grace in the first book of the series after seeing her struggling for life.
- Vampirate Captain – Mysterious captain of the Vampirate ship, whose authority has been questioned by his crew.
- Darcy Flotsam – Figurehead of the Vampirate ship by day and vampire by night; Grace's friend.
- Sidorio – Vampire who resisted the authority of the Vampirate Captain, resulting in his banishment.
- Cheng Li – Former deputy of the Diablo and current teacher at the Pirate Academy
- Captain Molucco Wrathe – Captain of the Diablo
- Matilda "Ma" Kettle – Owner of Ma Kettle's Tavern
- Bartholomew "Bart" Pearce – Fellow pirate aboard the Diablo and Connor's best friend
- Cutlass Cate – Becomes deputy of the Diablo once Cheng Li leaves; known for swordsmanship and skill.
- Sugar Pie – Waitress at Ma Kettle's Tavern
- Dexter Tempest – Father of the twins, also the lighthouse keeper of Crescent Moon Bay

== Release details ==
- 2005, UK, Simon & Schuster (ISBN 0689872631), pub. date – 6 June 2005, paperback (first edition)
- 2005, USA, Little Brown (ISBN 0316013730), pub. date – 4 October 2006, hardback
- 2007, USA, Little, Brown (ISBN 0316014443), pub. date – ? April 2007, paperback (reissue)
