= Booktrust Teenage Prize =

UK literary award

The Booktrust Teenage Prize was an annual award given to young adult literature published in the UK. The prize was administered by Book Trust, an independent charity which promotes books and reading. The Booktrust Teenage Prize was last awarded in 2010 and is no longer running.

== Honorees ==
Booktrust Teenage Prize winners and shortlists
Year	Author	Title	Result	Ref.
2003	Mark Haddon	The Curious Incident of the Dog in the Night-Time	Winner	
2003	Lynne Reid Banks	The Dungeon	Shortlist	
2003	Kevin Brooks	Lucas	Shortlist	
2003	Melvin Burgess	Doing It	Shortlist	
2003	Alan Gibbons	Caught in the Crossfire	Shortlist	
2003	Alan Gibbons	The Edge	Shortlist	
2003	Keith Gray	Malarky	Shortlist	
2003	Nicky Singer	Doll	Shortlist	
2004	Anne Cassidy	Looking for JJ	Winner	
2004	Alison Allen-Gray	Unique	Shortlist	
2004	Julie Bertagna	The Opposite of Chocolate	Shortlist	
2004	Berlie Doherty	Deep Secret	Shortlist	
2004	Catherine Forde	Fat Boy Swim	Shortlist	
2004	Alan Gibbons	The Dark Beneath	Shortlist	
2004	Bali Rai	Rani and Sukh	Shortlist	
2004	Matt Whyman	Boy Kills Man	Shortlist	
2005	Sarah Singleton	Century	Winner	
2005	Julie Burchill	Sugar Rush	Shortlist	
2005	Ann Halam	Siberia	Shortlist	
2005	Terri Paddock	Come Clean	Shortlist	
2005	Bali Rai	The Whisper	Shortlist	
2005	Meg Rosoff	How I Live Now	Shortlist	
2005	Karen Wallace	The Unrivalled Spangles	Shortlist	
2006	Anthony McGowan	Henry Tumour	Winner	
2006	Siobhan Dowd	A Swift Pure Cry	Shortlist	
2006	Ally Kennen	Beast	Shortlist	
2006	Paul Magrs	Exchange	Shortlist	
2006	Marcus Sedgwick	The Foreshadowing	Shortlist	
2006	John Singleton	Angel Blood	Shortlist	
2007	Marcus Sedgwick	My Swordhand Is Singing	Winner	
2007	Theresa Breslin	The Medici Seal	Shortlist	
2007	Kate Cann	Leaving Poppy	Shortlist	
2007	Mal Peet	The Penalty	Shortlist	
2007	Philip Reeve	Here Lies Arthur	Shortlist	
2007	Meg Rosoff	Just in Case	Shortlist	
2008	Patrick Ness	The Knife of Never Letting Go	Winner	
2008	Sally Gardner	The Red Necklace	Shortlist	
2008	Anthony Horowitz	Snakehead	Shortlist	
2008	Tanya Landman	Apache	Shortlist	
2008	Anthony McGowan	The Knife That Killed Me	Shortlist	
2008	Kate Thompson	Creature of the Night	Shortlist	
2009	Neil Gaiman	The Graveyard Book	Winner	
2009	Paul Dowswell	Auslander	Shortlist	
2009	Helen Grant	The Vanishing of Katharina Linden	Shortlist	
2009	Keith Gray	Ostrich Boys	Shortlist	
2009	Patrick Ness	The Ask and the Answer	Shortlist	
2009	Jenny Valentine	The Ant Colony	Shortlist	
2010	Gregory Hughes	Unhooking The Moon	Winner	
2010	Zizou Corder	Halo	Shortlist	
2010	Charlie Higson	The Enemy	Shortlist	
2010	Sarra Manning	Nobody's Girl	Shortlist	
2010	Marcus Sedgwick	Revolver	Shortlist	
2010	Jason Wallace	Out of Shadows	Shortlist	
