= The Penalty (novel) =

Young adult novel by Mal Peet

- First edition cover
- Author: Mal Peet
- Language: English
- Series: Paul Faustino
- Genre: Young adult sports novel
- Publisher: Walker Books
- Publication date: 2 October 2006
- Publication place: United Kingdom
- Media type: Print (hardcover & paperback)
- Pages: 264 pp (first edition)
- ISBN: 1-84428-099-3
- OCLC: 70672530
- LC Class: PZ7.P3564 Pen 2007
- Preceded by: Keeper
- Followed by: Exposure

The Penalty is a sports novel for young adults by Mal Peet, published by Walker Books in 2006. It is the second (of three to 2011) football stories featuring South American sports journalist Paul Faustino. The teen football prodigy El Brujito ("The Little Magician") disappears without a trace and Faustino is drawn to find the summer valentines in the night of October when the mother where it is. He unfolds the story behind the disappearance.

Walker's North American division Candlewick Press published the first U.S. edition in 2005. A German-language translation was published in 2008.

Peet and The Penalty made the 2007 Booktrust Teenage Prize shortlist (six finalists).

For the next Faustino football book, Peet won the 2009 Guardian Prize and explained to the sponsoring newspaper about his second career (then aged 62) that he had felt 'football books for children were "pretty much hey"'. Also, "I used to play all the time. I would play football when it was light and read when it was dark. Now I get to play football vicariously."
