= Matt Whyman =

British novelist (born 1969)

- Born: 1969 (age 56–57); Amersham, Buckinghamshire
- Occupation: novelist
- Writing career
- Period: 1993–present
- Genre: Young adult fiction
- Notable work: Boy Kills Man
- Website: www.mattwhyman.com

Matt Whyman is a British novelist and non-fiction writer, formerly known for his work as an advice columnist for numerous teenage magazines.

== Biography ==
Born in 1969, Matt Whyman grew up in Berkhamsted, Hertfordshire, and has an MA from the UEA Creative Writing course (1992) taught by Sir Malcolm Bradbury and Rose Tremain. He has written widely for all ages across a range of subjects in fiction and non-fiction, notably Boy Kills Man (2004), a critically acclaimed story of Colombian child assassins published in translation around the world. From January 2023 to July 2024, Whyman was embedded with the Mercedes AMG Petronas F1 Team to write The Sunday Times Bestseller, Inside Mercedes F1: Life in the Fast Lane (2024)

In 1995, Whyman became the first male advice columnist for 19 magazine. He went on to hold a 10-year residency as AOL UK's online agony uncle, and for 18 years at Bliss Magazine from 1996 until its closure in 2014. He has created many national health awareness campaigns for BBC Radio 1, CLIC Sargent, Macmillan and Brook Advisory, written widely on teenage issues for the national press, and often appeared on radio and television in this role. In 1997, Whyman co-presented a series of ITV's cult Saturday morning sex and relationships show, Love Bites, and from 2011-2013 served as the resident agony uncle on BBC Radio 1's live advice show, The Surgery.

As well as teaching creative writing across the UK, and for the British Council in Russia, Mexico, Africa and the Middle East, Whyman is an established ghostwriter and collaborative author. In the latter role, he has worked on books with Billy Connolly (Tracks Across America, 2016), Charles Eugster (Age is Just a Number 2017), Matthew Syed (You are Awesome, 2018) and Gareth Southgate (Anything is Possible, 2020) among others. In 2015, he wrote the graphic novel Username: Evie, with the story provided by Joe Sugg, who was credited as the lead author of the work, and with the art provided by Amrit Birdi, as well as two further titles, Username: Regenerated (2016) and Username: Uprising (2017). Whyman is also the author of The Nice & Accurate Good Omens TV Companion (2019) to accompany the series, Good Omens, based upon the novel by Neil Gaiman and Terry Pratchett, and Our Planet, based on the Netflix series, with a foreword by Sir David Attenborough.

Matt Whyman lives in West Sussex. He is married with four children.

== Books ==
=== Novels ===
- Man or Mouse (2000), Hodder Headline ISBN 978-0340769034
- Columbia Road (2002) Hodder Headline ISBN 978-0340769058
- Superhuman (2003), Hodder Children's Books ISBN 978-0340866078
- Boy Kills Man (2004), Hodder Children's Books ISBN 978-0340881941
- The Wild (2005), Hodder Children's Books ISBN 978-0340884539
- So Below (2005), Simon & Schuster (republished as Street Runners in 2008) ISBN 978-1471118494
- Inside the Cage (2007), Simon & Schuster /Atheneum Books (as Icecore) ISBN 978-1416926696
- Goldstrike (2009), Simon & Schuster & Atheneum Books ISBN 978-1847384515
- Lazlo Strangolov's Feather & Bone (2009) Walker Books ISBN 978-1406316605
- Lazlo Strangolov's Tooth & Claw (2011) Walker Books ISBN 978-1406323450
- Battle Champions: Academy Attack (2013) Simon & Schuster (co-written as Jack Carson) ISBN 978-0857075598
- Battle Champions: Canyon Clash (2013) Simon & Schuster (co-written as Jack Carson) ISBN 978-0857075611
- Battle Champions: Swampland Slam (2013) Simon & Schuster co-written as Jack Carson) ISBN 978-0857075635
- Battle Champions: Terminal Takedown (2013) Simon & Schuster (co-written as Jack Carson) ISBN 978-0857075659
- The Savages (2013) Hot Key Books ISBN 978-1468308563
- American Savage (2014) Hot Key Books ISBN 978-1471400698
- Boy Kills Man Tenth Anniversary Edition (2014) Hot Key Books ISBN 9781471403965
- Bad Apple (2016) Hot Key Books ISBN 978-1471404207

=== Non-fiction ===
- Wise Guides: Smoking (2000), Hodder Children's Books ISBN 978-0340778425
- Wise Guides: Drinking (2002), Hodder Children's Books ISBN 978-0340818053
- XY: A Toolkit for Life (2002), Hodder Children's Books (republished as Unzipped in 2007) ISBN 978-0340945339
- XY100: 100 strategies for life (2004), Hodder Children's Books ISBN 978-0340881521
- Wise Guides: Family Break Up (2005), Hodder Children's Books ISBN 978-0340883945
- Oink / Pig in the Middle (2011) Hodder Headline ISBN 978-1444711448
- Walking With Sausage Dogs (2012) Hodder Headline ISBN 978-1444734270
- The Unexpected Genius of Pigs (2018) HarperCollins ISBN 978-0008301224
- The Nice & Accurate Good Omens TV Companion (2019) Hodder Headline ISBN 978-1472258298
- Our Planet (2019) HarperCollins ISBN 978-0008375249
- Be More Sausage (2020) HarperCollins ISBN 978-0008405649
- Failure is an Option (2022) Vertebrate Publishing ISBN 978-1839811333
- Inside Mercedes F1 (2024) Penguin ISBN 978-1529916799

=== Short stories ===
- Visionary (1992) Minerva (published in New Writing 2 edited by Malcolm Bradbury & Andrew Motion) ISBN 0749398531
- crusoe.com (2000) Hodder Headline (published in the NEL Book of Internet Short Stories edited by Maxim Jakubowski) ISBN 978-0340769737
- Enfemme (2001) HarperCollins (published in Girls' Night Out/Boys' Night In edited by Jessica Adams, Chris Manby & Fiona Walker) ISBN 978-0007122035
- Eleven Pipers Piping (2006) Virago (published in Twelve Days edited by Shelley Silas) ISBN 978-1844081615
- Eclipsed (2010) Walker Books (published in The Truth is Dead edited by Marcus Sedgwick) ISBN 978-1406320039
- Uplifted (2013) Hot Key Books (published in The Booby Trap edited by Dawn O'Porter) ISBN 978-1471401428
- Ghost Story (2014) Andersen Press (published in War Girls) ISBN 978-1783440603
- Eclipsed (2015) Oxford University Press (published in War & Conflict edited by Benjamin Hulme-Cross) ISBN 978-1382028707

== Prizes and awards ==
- 2004 Booktrust Teenage Prize (shortlist) Boy Kills Man
- 2005 Stockport Schools' Book Award (shortlist) Boy Kills Man
- 2006 De Jonge Jury (Netherlands) (shortlist) Boy Kills Man
- 2006 Wirral Paperback of the Year (shortlist) Boy Kills Man
- 2006 Renfrewshire Teenage Book Award (shortlist) The Wild
- 2007 Wirral Paperback of the Year (longlist) The Wild
- 2013 North East Teenage Book Award (shortlist) The Savages
- 2014 Angus Book Award (winner), The Savages
