= Tamar (novel) =

2005 young adult novel by Mal Peet

- Front cover of first edition
- Author: Mal Peet
- Language: English
- Genre: Young adult historical novel, war novel (underground)
- Publisher: Walker Books
- Publication date: 3 October 2005
- Publication place: United Kingdom
- Media type: Print (hardcover)
- Pages: 432 pp (first edition)
- ISBN: 978-0-7445-6570-6
- OCLC: 61129424
- LC Class: PZ7.P3564 Tam 2007

Tamar: A Novel of Espionage, Passion, and Betrayal is a young-adult novel by Mal Peet, published by Walker Books in 2005. Within a 1995 frame story, where a 15-year-old girl inherits papers and other mementos from her deceased grandfather, it is set in the occupied Netherlands near the end of the Second World War; there it features two British-trained Dutch agents and the resistance to the German occupation of the Netherlands. The novel interweaves past and present to show the lasting effects of war and the passions it arouses.

Peet won the annual Carnegie Medal from the British librarians, recognising the year's best children's book published in the U.K. According to WorldCat, it is his work most widely held in participating libraries.

Walker's U.S. division, Candlewick Press published the first North American edition in February 2007, entitled Tamar: A Novel of Espionage, Passion, and Betrayal.

== Plot summary ==
=== 1945 ===
Part of the book takes place in 1945 the Netherlands, during the last part of World War II. The story centers on two Dutch men codenamed Tamar and Dart, who are agents of a covert military group called the Special Operations Executive, or SOE. At this point in time, the Netherlands is occupied by the Nazis, and the Dutch resistance is "a bloody shambles". Tamar and Dart, his WO (wireless operator), are sent into the Netherlands to organize the different resistance groups into a more cohesive unit. This is Tamar's second time in the Netherlands as an SOE agent, and he is sent to recover his old alias, Christiaan Boogart. When he arrives, he reunites with the woman he fell in love with the first time he was in the Netherlands, Marijke. As the novel continues, Dart begins to spend more time with Marijke and begins to fall in love with her, oblivious to the fact that she and Tamar are in love.

After realizing that Tamar and Marijke are involved, Dart is described as feeling furious and comes to the conclusion "that it was not her fault. She had been seduced, cynically and deliberately, by the man [Tamar] who should have been protecting her." Slowly he begins to hate and distrust Tamar. Meanwhile, a group of the resistance led by Koop de Vries open fire on a Nazi vehicle. One of the men they shot turns out to be the "head of Nazi internal security in Holland" SS Lieutenant General Hanns Albin Rauter. Rauter is rushed to a hospital and dispatches his deputy to execute the number of Dutch prisoners (known as toteskandidaten, death candidates) as there are bullet holes in his car, 243. When Tamar hears about this, and the executions begin, he tracks down Koop and confronts him, telling him, "I know where to find you."

As the story continues, Koop and his group are ambushed by the Nazis at their hideout, and everyone is killed except for Koop, who manages to run. At the asylum where Koop receives medical treatment, he reveals to Dart that he believes Dart and Tamar have betrayed the resistance. Dart believes he gains Koop's confidence by telling him, "I believe you. I think Tamar betrayed your group." The two create a plan to get rid of Tamar. Their plan goes smoothly; they kill Tamar, but Koop attacks Dart and is shot by Marjke. When she sees Tamar's body, "she [throws] her head back and [begins] to howl like an animal." Eventually Dart convinces Marijke that it is too dangerous to stay in the Netherlands, and the two flee to England.

=== 1995 ===
In the prologue of the novel, before Tamar is born, her grandfather, William Hyde, requests her father, Jan, to name her Tamar. The novel then fast forwards to when Tamar is fifteen years old in London, in 1995, and lives with her mother after her father, Jan, disappears. Her grandmother, Marijke, is slowly going mentally downhill and speaks more Dutch than English. Tamar and her mother accompany her grandfather to the assisted living center where her grandmother will be staying. Her grandmother rejects the company of her grandfather and insists on riding only with Tamar: "I'm not going with you! I'm staying with Tamar, here with Tamar." Shortly after her grandmother is sent to the living center, her grandfather commits suicide. Tamar takes his death hard, and waits months to go and visit her grandfather's flat with her mother. Once at the flat, she finds a box lying on her bed labeled Tamar. Inside the box lie many clues leading to her grandfather's past. She takes the box to her distant cousin Yoyo (Johannes van Zant), who decides they should follow the clues and see where they lead.

In the middle of the plot, during Tamar and Yoyo's adventure along the Tamar River, they slowly start to fall in love with each other, despite their age differences. As the novel continues, Tamar and Yoyo explore the river just as Tamar's father happens upon them, "And I couldn't look at him, because I was watching the other man's face and he was watching mine", and invites them into his home. After settling everyone down, Tamar's father begins to unravel the secret he has kept hidden since the day he left Tamar and her mother. He tells Tamar and Yoyo that her supposed grandfather, William Hyde, is not actually her grandfather. Her real grandfather is Tamar (Christaan Boogart), who was killed in World War II by a man named Koop de Vries, and was led to do so by William Hyde, or Dart as he was known during that time. It takes Tamar awhile to take all this in; "I couldn’t imagine how he could have kept all that stuff dammed up inside him all this time without being at least three parts crazy", and she even forgives Hyde. In the epilogue, she ends up marrying Yoyo.

== Characters ==
=== 1995 ===
- Tamar Hyde, a fifteen-year-old girl who lives in London in 1995, is the protagonist in the novel. She was named by her grandfather, William Hyde, after her biological grandfather. Her father disappears, and she is practically raised by her grandparents. In the novel she has a very special connection with her grandfather. They do puzzles together, and he sends her coded letters. She remembers many of the clues her grandfather taught her and uses them in daily life to help figure out problems. Tamar is very critical and analyzing.
- Johannes van Zant (Yoyo), a Johannes, or Yoyo to Tamar, a nineteen-year-old young man from the Netherlands, is "[Tamar's] Dutch cousin. Actually, he's not really called Yoyo, and he isn’t really [Tamar's] cousin ... he is a distant twig on [Tamar's] family tree." Yoyo is described as having "hair the colour of wet straw ... there’s something slightly oriental about his face. He has wide cheekbones and narrow, dark, very shiny eyes."
- Jan Hyde, son of Marijke Maartens and Tamar (1945) , abandoned his wife and daughter after learning the truth about his father. Towards the end of the book he is found by his daughter, Tamar, and is telling her why he left. He is depicted as having "a look on his face that [Tamar] recognized. [Tamar had] seen it on the faces of poor, crazy homeless people on the streets, the ones who are desperate to tell you their tragic life stories. Dad had the same twist to his mouth, the same determination to get things said."
- Sonia Hyde is a character who was abandoned by her husband, Jan. She is Tamar's mother and married to Jan Hyde. In the prologue Jan says, "If I say I like it, [Sonia]'ll probably hate it."

=== 1945 ===
- Dart (Dr. Ernst Lubbers/William Hyde), a Dutch resistance fighter in the SOE (the Special Operations Executive), trained in London. He is Tamar's wireless operator in the Netherlands after they are deployed. He falls in love with the character Marijke to the point of obsession. Later in the story, Tamar Hyde, his granddaughter, depicts him as "living in a world full of mirages and mazes, of mirrors and misleading signs." He [is] fascinated by riddles and codes and conundrums and labyrinths, by the origin of place names, by grammar, by slang, by jokes ... by anything that might mean something else. He live[s] in a world that was slippery, changeable, fluid."
- Tamar (Christaan Boogart) is a Dutch Resistance fighter and an agent in the SOE (the Special Operations Executive) deployed in the Netherlands with his partner Dart in 1944–45. Tamar is the leader and organizer of all the resistance groups in his area of the Netherlands. He is Tamar Hyde's biological grandfather, and is said to have "thick dark hair cut short at the sides and a rather long narrow [face] ... the kind of features that a romantic novelist might describe as 'finely chiseled'"
- Marijke Maartens, a Dutch woman with "a fall of dark hair that [comes] almost to the narrow shoulders, framing [her] pale oval face", is Tamar's lover. In the novel, she lives on Sanctuary Farm near the town of Mendlo. Her parents died when she was young, so she lives with her grandmother, Oma. Later in the story, she is shown as developing dementia. She is Tamar Hyde's grandmother.
- Koop de Vries is a leader of one of the many Dutch Resistance groups in the Netherlands that appear in the novel. He and four other characters lead a violent rebellion against the Nazis in the area, where Tamar acts as the leader of the resistance. Koop is very skeptical of Tamar's ability to lead, so his group prefers to be alone and act independently. Koop is said to be "tall and hawkish, his face resembl[ing] a primitive weapon carved from bone."
- Trixie Greydanus is a fictional Dutch woman and Tamar and Dart's courier. She rides her bicycle to take messages back and forth for them with her infant daughter Rosa. In the novel, Trixie acts very determined and hard to sway. In her old age, Tamar's father, Jan, describes her: "She had the same bright chestnut-colored eyes as Rosa. She was wearing a lot of careful makeup, and her hair was strange. Cut in a very old-fashioned style and dyed a dark blond colour".
- SS Lieutenant General Hanns Albin Rauter is a Nazi general who is the "head of internal security for Holland". He "considers happiness to be a form of mental deficiency".

== Themes ==
For the New York Times Book Review, Elizabeth Devereaux noted on the topic of major themes of Tamar that "river metaphors and allusions flow freely, suggesting a world of secrets and false identities that is 'slippery, changeable, fluid'", and that "the reclamation of identity is a tortured process." Peet himself explained that "my books are about discovering or inventing who you are."

== Regional celebration ==
In Merseyside an edition of Tamar was Wirral Paperback of the Year in 2007. Mal Peet met with some of the teenagers who took part in Wirral Paperback of the Year on 7 March 2008. Tamar was part of Liverpool Reads in 2008.

== Style ==
Booklist complimented how "Peet's plot is tightly constructed, and striking, descriptive language, full of metaphor, grounds the story." School Library Journal points out how "Peet deftly handles the developing intrigue that totally focuses readers". School Library Journal also compliments how Tamar is "masterfully crafted, written in cinematic prose, and peopled by well-drawn, multi-dimensional characters." In the novel New York Times Reviewer Elizabeth Devereaux praises how "Mal Peet shows both restraint and daring." Also, Booklist praised the novel's "intricate wrapping of wartime dramar and secrecy." Booklist Publications added to the praise by saying how "Strikingly edcriptive language grounds this dramatic novel." Kirkus Reviews called the writing "Beautifully detailed." Kirkus Reviews also complimented Tamar by commenting "Stark in its realistic portrayal of the horror and random violence of war [and its d]escriptions of the daily brutality of merely surviving."

== Reception ==
Literary critics remarked on Mal Peet's exceptional storytelling. Jan Mark wrote: "This sombre and distinguished book is as fine a piece of storytelling as you are likely to read this year", and The Bookseller review said: "Beautifully written and absolutely gripping, this is exceptional storytelling."

Kirkus Reviews complimented the book as "beautifully detailed writing." Booklist Publications agreed, saying "complex and surprising, this [novel] grows richer with each reading." Roger Sutton of The Horn Book Magazine commented that "readers might think that they've wandered into Ken Follett territory for this novel." He also wrote and explained that "the writing is dramatic, and the covert Resistance activities are suspenseful and rich with the details of undercover warfare." However, he complains "[Tamar] is a satisfying genre fiction, it is only when the book introduces the YA slant 100 pages in that things become a bit awkward." School Library Journal disagrees though, and praised the novel as "intense and riveting" and called Tamar an "extraordinary, gripping novel." The emotional side of the novel has been acknowledged by Booklist, who commented that "Peet's sturdy, emotionally resonant characterization and damatic background will pull readers forward," and "despite foreshadowing the outcome is still a stunner." Tamar has also been noted by the North Devon Journal, who said "the story, a mixture of fact and fiction, will make its way into your mental nooks and crannies like ivy spreading across a wall," and that "this novel, like the ivy, will cling to your emotions." Kliatt mentioned that Tamar "read like a thriller, with the action of wartime (Winter, 1945)," and that it was "demanding, carefully written story, with dreadful details of betrayal and violence."

It was considered to transcend the category of young-adult fiction: "This is an outstanding novel. Outstanding in every regard. It establishes Peet as a novelist of immense gift and versatility, for no two novels could be more different than Keeper and Tamar and yet be so equally brilliant. ... Tamar is a novel worthy of standing with the very best of contemporary British fiction."

The American Library Association named Tamar one of the top ten books for young adults in 2008.

== See also ==
Awards
Preceded by Millions	Carnegie Medal recipient 2005	Succeeded by Just in Case
