= Floodland =

Floodland may refer to:

- Floodland (novel), a 2000 fantasy novel by Marcus Sedgwick
- Floodland (album), a 1987 album by the Sisters of Mercy
- Floodland (video game), a 2022 game by Vile Monarch

== See also ==
- Floodplain
