= Angel Blood =

Angel Blood may refer to:

- Angel Blood (novel), a 2006 young adult novel by John Singleton
- Angel Blood (album), a 1997 album by Leonardo's Bride
