= The Kiss of Death (novel) =

2008 Britannia Novel

- First edition
- Author: Marcus Sedgwick
- Language: English
- Series: shadow queen
- Genre: Horror
- Publisher: Orion Books
- Publication date: 2008
- Publication place: England
- Media type: Print (Hardback)

The Kiss of Death is a novel written by the British writer and illustrator Marcus Sedgwick and the sequel to My Swordhand is Singing. Set in 18th century Venice, it follows the story of a young boy called Marko, who is looking for his missing father. Soon enough, old adversaries emerge.

== Plot description ==
"Peter's ongoing search for the Shadow Queen leads him to Venice - the fabled city with lapping waterways, crumbling magnificence, dark, twisting alleyways and surprising piazzas. A city whose beauty disguises many ugly secrets. The Shadow Queen is there, gathering strength, recruiting a new army of the Undead for a final confrontation.

Marko and Sorrel meet in Venice for the first time. They must uncover the mystery of what has happened both to Sorrel's father, who is plagued by a strange madness that prevents him from sleeping, and to Marko's father, a doctor, who has mysteriously gone missing after travelling to Venice to help his old friend".
