= Midwinterblood =

2013 novel by Marcus Sedgwick

- Author: Marcus Sedgwick
- Language: English
- Genre: Young adult fiction
- Publisher: Roaring Brook Press
- Publication date: 2013
- Publication place: England
- Media type: Print Hardcover
- Pages: 262
- ISBN: 9781596438002
- OCLC: 793339976

Midwinterblood is a young adult novel by Marcus Sedgwick, published by Roaring Brook Press in 2013. The book is composed of seven connected storylines told in reverse-chronological order, with time periods ranging from ancient times to the near future. Inspired by Swedish painter Carl Larsson's controversial painting Midvinterblot, the stories feature themes of love and sacrifice.

== Reception ==
The book received mostly positive but mixed reviews. In a New York Times review, Eoin Colfer describes the book as "a tale for the ages, expertly spun and completely satisfying in its conclusion". One School Library Journal review recommends the book, stating that "with ritual sacrifice, a vampire and plenty of blood secondary pupils will thoroughly enjoy this book. It is well worth having two on the library shelves."

In a review in The Guardian, Anthony McGowan praised the book as having "Sedgwick's characteristically brilliant structural complexity", but described some sections as "less successful" than others, noting that "the first story, which should propel the novel's backward momentum, stutters and falters". One review from a School Library Journal blog describes the book in depth, but admits "I still waver between work of art and stinking hot mess."

The book was awarded the Michael L. Printz Award in 2014. In 2013, it was shortlisted for the Carnegie Medal for Writing.
