= Come Clean =

Come Clean may refer to:

- Come Clean (1931 film), a 1931 short comedy film starring Laurel and Hardy
- Come Clean (2022 film), a 2022 documentary film about drug addiction
- Come Clean (novel) a novel by Terri Paddock
- Come Clean (Curve album) or its title song
- Come Clean (Dwarves album), 2000
- Come Clean (Puddle of Mudd album)
- "Come Clean" (rag), a 1905 rag by Paul Sarebresole
- "Come Clean" (Hilary Duff song), 2003
- "Come Clean" (Jeru the Damaja song), 1993
- "Come Clean", a song by Conrad Sewell from Ghosts & Heartaches, 2018
- Come Clean, a stand-up comedy album by Matt McCarthy
