= The Knife That Killed Me (film) =

2014 British drama film

- Directed by: Kit Monkman; Marcus Romer
- Screenplay by: Marcus Romer; Kit Monkman
- Based on: The Knife That Killed Me by Anthony McGowan
- Produced by: Thomas Mattinson; Alan Latham
- Starring: Jack McMullen; Reece Dinsdale; Haruka Abe; Andrew Dunn; Oliver Lee; Charles Mnene; Josh Brown; Thomas Teago; Rosie Goddard; Andrew Ellis; Alfie Stewart; Reece Douglas; Richard Crehan
- Distributed by: Universal Pictures (UK); Focus Features (US)
- Release date: 24 October 2014
- Running time: 95 minutes
- Country: United Kingdom
- Language: English
- Budget: £3 million

The Knife That Killed Me is a 2014 British drama film that was funded as a Kickstarter project. The story about a teenage boy who becomes involved in knife crime was adapted from the novel by Anthony McGowan. It was filmed in York, North Yorkshire in a purpose-built green screen stage at GSP Studios (at the former ARTTS International film school) at Bubwith, entirely on green screens. Production began in mid-February 2012 and filming began in mid-April. The film was released on 24 October 2014.

A casting call for the role of Paul was posted on 26 October 2011 and another for 'Yorkshire-based teenagers' was posted on 9 January 2012; the latter also states that Jeremy Zimmerman was the casting director.

== Cast ==
- Jack McMullen as Paul Varderman, the protagonist of the film and from whose memories it is created
- Reece Dinsdale as Paul's Dad
- Haruka Abe as Serena
- Andrew Ellis as Bates
- Richard Crehan as Kirk
- Alfie Stewart as Stevie
- Rosie Goddard as Maddy
- Grace Meurisse Francis as Freak
- Andrew Dunn as Mr Boyle
- Katherine Dow Blyton as Mrs Botharm
- Jamie Shelton as Roth, Paul's friend, the school bully, and the catalyst for conflict
- Reece Douglas as Mickey
- Thomas Teago as Compson and Goddo Gang Member
- Carl Anscombe as Goddo Gang Member
- Oliver Lee as Shane
- Sarah Baxendale as Shane's Mum
- Natalie Gavin as Marlene
- Charles Mnene as Goddo
- Josh Brown as Billy
- Josh Benson as Kevin
- Andrina Carroll as Mrs Eel
- Kerron Darby as Miller
- Sarah Poyzer as Paul's Mum
- Millie Romer as Kirsty
- Tom Collins as Tariq
- Coco Hoyle-Ansett
- Lewis Greenwood as Freak

== Soundtrack ==
The soundtrack was composed by Tom Adams

== Reception ==
The film received mixed reviews. Wendy Ide of The Times described it as "an experimental British drama... with a densely intensive visual verve." Leslie Felperin of The Guardian praised the film's stylized look

The film will also experience its Italian debut in the specialist youth selection of the Rome Film Festival.

== See also ==
- 2014 in film
- List of British films of 2014
