= Hellbent (McGowan novel) =

2005 novel by Anthony McGowan

- First edition (publ. Doubleday)
- Author: Anthony McGowan
- Publisher: Doubleday
- Publication date: January 1, 2005
- ISBN: 9780385608602

HellBent is a 2005 novel by Anthony McGowan. It tells the story of Connor O'Neil and his dog, who are killed by an ice cream van and sent to hell. It was received very well, despite being called "Down-right disgusting just for the sake of it".

== Plot summary ==
Sixteen-year-old Connor is on his way home from school when he is run down by an ice-cream truck. He is sent to hell with his dog, Scrote, who choked on an ice cream cone which rolled off the truck. There he is sentenced to spending all eternity reading intellectual books and listening to classical music with his personal devil tormentor, Clarence, and a transvestite Viking, Olaf. Eventually he meets a beautiful naked angel called Francessa who tells him that one person's hell could be his heaven. He sets out to swap hells with an elderly, classical music loving, homosexual gentlemen whose hell is to constantly play the PlayStation and have his penis fondled by nude women. He, Clarence, Scrote and Olaf set out on a long journey, of which if they are caught means they will be annihilated and be gone forever. On their travels, Olaf is captured and annihilated. Eventually they reach Connor's heaven, but he finds that Clarence has betrayed him. Olaf also betrayed him and is not dead, but then tries to help Connor and is this time killed for good. Connor and Scrote are sentenced to their ideal heaven, which has now become their worst nightmare as their tastes have changed. Connor notices a lever on the annihilator which has a plus and a minus. Figuring that it will reincarnate him if he changes it to plus and jumps in, he does so. It is left to the reader to decide whether Connor and Scrote were reincarnated or were fully annihilated.

== Reception ==
On behalf of The Bulletin of the Center for Children's Books, April Spisak wrote,

McGowan teeters between horrifyingly disgusting and outrageously humorous in his creation of a Hell. [...] The result is a novel that is decidedly not for the faint of heart or weak of stomach, but readers who endure (or enjoy) the grossout details will be well rewarded with a complex and clever adventure spiked with effective horror details and religious exploration. Long after the revulsion has faded, readers will likely remember the intriguing notion of a personalized Hell, the creepy, ambiguous ending, and Conor himself, a deeply flawed but ultimately sympathetic character.
