= Blood Red, Snow White =

2007 novel by Marcus Sedgwick

- First edition, 2007
- Author: Marcus Sedgwick
- Language: English
- Genre: Historical novel
- Publisher: Orion Children's Books
- Publication date: 6 August 2007
- Publication place: United Kingdom
- Pages: 320pp

Blood Red, Snow White is a historical novel by Marcus Sedgwick published in 2007. It is a novel set during the Russian Revolution, a fictionalised account of the time the author Arthur Ransome spent in Russia. It was shortlisted for the 2007 Costa Children's Book Award.

== Plot introduction ==
The novel describes the origins and events of the Russian Revolution, interwoven with the experiences of Arthur Ransome, then a journalist in Russia. He becomes acquainted with the leading Bolsheviks and begins a romance with Trotsky's secretary Evgenia who will become his second wife. He also has close contact with people working for the British government and must decide where his loyalties lie.

== Plot summary ==
The novel is in three parts. The first part, "A Russian Fairy Tale", deliberately evokes the atmosphere of Arthur Ransome's Old Peter's Russian Tales. It is a fairy-tale account of the circumstances leading to the Russian Revolution, featuring the poor woodcutter, the orphaned children, the romantic but oblivious Royal family, the mad monk, the sleeping bear and the two conspirators in the wood.

The novel continues by presenting history from the perspective of an individual, an outsider. The English writer Arthur Ransome leaves his wife and daughter in London and travels to Russia to collect folktales. With the start of the First World War, he stays to observe events, becoming a correspondent for The Daily News. In the second part of the novel, "One Night in Moscow", Ransome is haunted by the scenes he has witnessed. They appear as a scatter of flashbacks, reflecting the confusion in his mind. He has experienced the pull of Bolshevik idealism and has fallen in love with Trotsky's secretary, Evgenia. On the other hand he is appalled by the brutality of some revolutionaries and considers helping his friend Robert Lockhart of the British Embassy. He finally decides that he has no business interfering with the destiny of Russia, one way or the other, and leaves Moscow for Stockholm.

The final part, "A Fairy Tale, Ending", focuses on Ransome's private life, shifting into first person narration. Ransome's supposed Bolshevist sympathies bring him under suspicion when the Red Terror begins, but he redeems himself by helping to free Lockhart from the Kremlin. Ransome is happy with Evgenia in Stockholm and when she has to return to Russia, he chooses to go with her. To ease his return, he reconsiders the offer from the SIS and becomes agent S76. Lenin welcomes him back to Russia, dismissing Trotsky's fears that he might be a spy.

On what is intended to be a brief visit to England, he meets unexpected difficulties, being questioned by the authorities and losing his job with the Daily News. It is some months before he regains his journalist status, and meanwhile there is civil war in Russia. As the Tsarist White Army makes advances against the Bolshevik Red Army, he becomes worried for Evgenia's safety. He takes considerable risks to return to Russia and eventually succeeds in bringing her back west with him.

== Allusions to actual history ==
The novel closely follows the events of the Russian Revolution. The book incorporates a timeline, beginning with Bloody Sunday 1905 and ending in November 1919. It includes an account of Ransome's possible spying activities and reprints some Secret Service documents released by the National Archives in 2005. Historical figures featured in the book include Rasputin, Vladimir Lenin, Lev Trotsky and the secret agents Robert Lockhart and Sidney Reilly. The writer Arthur Ransome and his future wife Evgenia Shelepina were also real people.

== Reception ==
Blood Red, Snow White was favourably reviewed by the major British newspapers and was shortlisted for the 2007 Costa Children's Book Award.

== Publication history ==
The first edition hardback published in August 2007 by Orion Children's Books was printed throughout in dark red ink. A paperback edition was issued in May 2008. An audio CD was issued in March 2008 by Oakhill Publishing Limited.
