= Whispers in the Graveyard =

1994 children's novel by Theresa Breslin

- First edition cover
- Author: Theresa Breslin
- Language: English
- Genre: Children's novel, supernatural fiction
- Publisher: Methuen Young Books
- Publication date: August 1994
- Publication place: United Kingdom
- Media type: Print (hardback and paperback)
- Pages: 127 pp (first edition)
- ISBN: 0-416-19052-9
- OCLC: 31078758
- LC Class: PZ7.B7545 Wh 2007

Whispers in the Graveyard is a children's novel by Theresa Breslin, published by Methuen in 1994. Breslin won the annual Carnegie Medal in 1994 from the Library Association, recognising the year's best children's book by a British subject. In a retrospective award citation the librarians call it "a gripping, powerful and haunting story".

Richard Conlon and Theresa Breslin adapted the novel as a play, which was published by Heinemann in 2009.

WorldCat participating libraries report holding Spanish, Catalan, Italian, Thai, and Korean-language editions.

== Origins ==
According to the author, her work as a librarian exposed her to "parents asking for books about dyslexia, for names of help groups, names of special tutors etc." She attended a local meeting of the British Dyslexia Association and recognised the pain and frustration of children, their families, and educators. She determined to write a book featuring a boy, in the first person and present tense.

She started writing without a story but "a ring road was being built in my home town, and to do this it was necessary to move the interred bodies out of an old graveyard which lay in the path of the new road. One of the graves included a mass grave of smallpox victims (children) When the news became public there was a big scare."

== Plot introduction ==
Whispers in the Graveyard is about a 12-year-old boy called Solomon, who has a learning disability called dyslexia. Solomon has a very hard time with life as his mother left when he was young, his father is an alcoholic and everyone picks on him including a bullying teacher called Mr Watkins also known as Warrior Watkins

Solomon hears that bodies buried in a graveyard died of smallpox and if disturbed could spread the infection again, but the real danger is of a supernatural nature.

== Plot summary ==
Solomon is a Scottish boy in the last year of primary school who is considered to be stupid and lazy, though he is actually dyslexic. He is bullied by his form teacher at school, and at home his father, who it is revealed is also dyslexic, drinks all the time and neglects him. Solomon often goes to the local graveyard for refuge.

Overhearing a discussion between a council official and Professor Miller, he is upset to hear that his special place is to become a construction site. When the graveyard's protective rowan tree is uprooted by workmen, he has bad dreams and hears mysterious whispers. Driven by his father's behaviour to spend the night in the graveyard, he witnesses one of the workmen being swallowed up by the ground after unearthing a mysterious chest marked with the word "Malefice".

He later discovers that the word means "witchcraft", and that a victim of the Scottish witch hunt is buried there. It seems she has awoken and is intent on vengeance. Amy Miller, the professor's young daughter, who has struck up a friendship with him, is drawn to the graveyard. Solomon follows to protect her from the evil presence which tries to possess her. With his father's help, he manages to rescue her and save himself.

With the encouragement of Ms Talmur, one of the teachers from school who has helped him throughout the book but leaves to get a promotion at the end, he begins to change his life, although he knows it will be an uphill struggle. His father agrees to attend an Alcoholics Anonymous class to perhaps change his life also.

== Reception ==
Whispers in the Graveyard received many positive reviews, and was notably described in The Independent's Weekend Review as "one of those rare books that makes you want to put your life on hold for as long as it takes to finish it... formidably good writing, full of wit and wisdom, from which children will go away encouraged rather than demoralised at the possibilities of the human condition."

It is used in classrooms to promote good writing and also discussions about dyslexia and bullying.

== See also ==
Awards
Preceded by Stone Cold	Carnegie Medal recipient 1994	Succeeded by Northern Lights
