= Keeper (Peet novel) =

2003 young adult novel by Mal Peet

- First edition cover
- Author: Mal Peet
- Cover artist: Yves St. Laurent
- Language: English
- Genre: Young adult sports novel
- Publisher: Walker Books
- Publication date: 6 October 2003
- Publication place: United Kingdom
- Media type: Print (hardback and paperback)
- Pages: 230 pp (first edition)
- ISBN: 0-7445-9025-6
- OCLC: 60376723
- LC Class: PZ7.P3564 Kee 2003; PZ7.P3564 Kee 2003

Keeper is a sports novel for young adults by Mal Peet, published by Walker Books in 2003. It was Peet's first novel and the first of three (as of 2012) football stories featuring South American sports journalist Paul Faustino. Cast as an interview with Faustino, the world's best goalkeeper, El Gato ('The Cat'), tells his life story. Peet won the Branford Boase Award, recognising the year's best debut novel for children.

Walker's North American division Candlewick Press published the first US edition in 2005. Danish and Hungarian-language translations were also published that year and followed by German, Italian, and Spanish-language editions.

== Background ==
Keeper was Peet's first novel, undertaken at age 52 and completed three years later.

When he won the 2009 Guardian Prize for his third Paul Faustino football novel, Exposure, he told the sponsoring newspaper he had felt that 'football books for children were "pretty much crap"'. Also, "I used to play all the time. I would play football when it was light and read when it was dark. Now I get to play football vicariously."

Peet described his creative occupation thus: "I come up here in the morning to a pleasant room in the roof of my house and imagine I'm a black South American football superstar, then I have to imagine I'm a female pop celebrity who's pregnant. It's a completely mad way to spend your time. If I did it in public I would be sectioned. Writing is a form of licensed madness."

== Synopsis ==
Paul Faustino, a journalist for La Nación, is interviewing El Gato about his recent World Cup win. During the interview, El Gato tells Faustino about his teenage years and his entry into soccer. When El Gato tells Faustino that he is coached by a ghost known to El Gato as "the Keeper," Faustino thinks El Gato is lying to him. However, El Gato seems honest and looks like he is telling the truth.

El Gato continues to tell the interviewer his story. As a teenager, he secretly trains with the Keeper in an abandoned soccer field hidden in the rainforest. The young El Gato convinces his parents his time in the rainforest is the result of his fascination with nature. His family takes him for a naturalist, buying him collection materials and calling him "Professor." The charade continues until El Gato turns 15, when he is expected to start working in the logging industry with his father. He does not tell the Keeper that he will no longer come to practice.

His first Saturday at work he finds out that his co-workers play a game of soccer after work. His co-workers invite him to play as the goalkeeper and, in his first game since his training with the Keeper, he helps his team win. The next Saturday, he plays with a new player who the others call "El Ladron", meaning "the thief." In reality, El Ladron is a director for a soccer camp named DSJ. He also brings the owners of the team, Mr. and Mrs. DaSilva to the games. They want to sign El Gato for a two-year contract and give him 10,000 dollars. This begins his professional football career.

Finally, El Gato reveals to Paul Faustino that he cheated in the second last penalty shot of the World Cup.

El Gato tells Faustino that he wants the interview to be a book. Faustino hesitates because he has to give this interview to his boss. However, he changes his mind and helps El Gato turn his interview into a book. El Gato eventually quits soccer and becomes a naturalist, just as his parents had always imagined. At the end of the novel, El Gato explains the Keeper's history as a real player.

== Characters ==
In Keeper there are three main characters. The first character that will be written about is El Gato, the protagonist of the story. El Gato is actually just a nickname. He is a huge man who normally is very quiet. He is a world cup winning goalkeeper, and throughout the story, he is telling a soccer reporter his past in an interview. El Gato's mentor was a mysterious man referred to 'The Keeper' and nothing more. The Keeper's actual name is never mentioned at all in the book. The Keeper was somewhat of a phantom, and one doesn't learn much about him until the end of the story. The last character was a reporter, whose name is Paul Faustino. He wants to do the interview to receive a big bonus from his boss, because Paul is obsessed with money. NB: The reporter, Paul Faustino, was the first character mentioned in the story. El Gato was the second, and the Keeper was the third.

== Awards ==
Beside winning the Branford Boase Award, Keeper was bronze runner up for the Smarties Prize in ages category 9–11 years and made the Hampshire Book Award shortlist.
