= The Book of Dead Days =

Novel by Marcus Sedgwick

- First edition, 2003
- Author: Marcus Sedgwick
- Illustrator: None
- Cover artist: Geoff Taylor
- Language: English
- Series: The Book of Dead Days
- Genre: Fantasy
- Publisher: Orion Children's Books
- Publication date: 17 July 2003
- Publication place: U.K.
- Media type: Print (hardcover)
- Pages: 273pp
- ISBN: 0-385-74704-7
- Preceded by: None
- Followed by: The Dark Flight Down

The Book of Dead Days is a novel by Marcus Sedgwick. It tells the story of a 15-year-old named Boy, a sorcerer named Valerian, a girl named Willow, and a scientist named Kepler. The Book of Dead Days is set in the days between Christmas and New Year, the period of time to which the title refers: "a strange, a quiet interlude, somehow outside the rest of the year, outside time itself."

== Plot introduction ==
The days between Christmas and New Year’s Eve are dead days, when spirits roam beneath the surface of our lives. A magician called Valerian has only 4 days to live and will die on the dawn of the new year, he must save his own life within those few days, or pay the price that he made with evil so many years ago, but are no match against the great power pursuing him. Helping him is his servant, Boy, a child with no name or past, and the orphan girl, Willow. Together they dig in death-fields at midnight, and are swept into the subterranean city on a journey from which there is no escape.

== Plot summary ==
The story starts off in a theatre in a city only known as 'Grand Theater'. Valerian is performing a magic trick using Boy's talent to fit into small spaces. Boy is Valerian's slave (Valerian calls him his 'famulus'). He is treated cruelly by Valerian. Boy, after the show, is sent to a pub to collect something from an acquaintance of Valerian's. This something is a music box, which the increasingly distracted Valerian assures Boy that he needs.

The acquaintance, an ugly man named Green, walks to the toilet; Boy follows. The man is killed (although it is not clear what killed him, since the killer was shielded by purple smoke) and Boy takes the music box and leaves the pub, running into Willow. Willow had found out the Theater Director, Korp, is dead, killed by a mysterious beast named the Phantom. Both of them are coated in blood because of the deaths that night. They are both arrested and accused of the murder of the director.

Valerian breaks into their prison and gets them out, taking both Boy and Willow to his home. Boy gives him the music box. Valerian plays it but is unable to discern the meaning. Willow gains his trust by working out the music box spells a name because of Willow's perfect pitch. She identifies the notes as 'G-A-D-B-E-E-B-E', the name of a man who had died. They search the largest cemetery in town for his grave; it is not in a single one. Valerian is attacked by people who owed money and buried alive. Boy and Willow manage to dig him out and drag him home, Valerian now increasingly more desperate and with a broken arm. They have to go and see the director of funerals. Valerian sends Boy alone while he and Willow visit Kepler, Valerian's old rival and associate. They believe Kepler has gone mad, as he has made bizarre patterns all over his basement, with one phrase written in Latin by it: "The miller sees not all water that goes by his mill". Boy is unable to get a meeting with the Director, but he sees that he is a madman who tries to put together mutilated pieces of dead animals together and bring them back to life by looking through the dome over his workspace. Valerian, Willow and Boy return there and manage to get the information they want, by using Kepler's electricity to fool the Director, and leave the city to find the grave, buried in a town called Lindon.

Buried with Gad Beebe, is the mysterious Book of Dead Days, that apparently holds the answer to everyone's biggest question. Boy and Willow later find out that Valerian had fallen in love with a woman and he gave up the last 15 years of his life for one night with her, but she rejected him despite the enchantment, the reason Valerian fought with Kepler.

The three get arrested (again) for their fruitless efforts digging up Beebe's grave, and are stowed away in dungeons. They escape through the city's underground channels, which were the patterns Kepler had traced in his basement. They find out Kepler had the book, and it is a race against time to find it. Boy pushes Kepler overboard into the channel.

Valerian finds the book and opens it, Willow reads over his shoulder and screams for Boy to run that Valerian will kill him in place of himself. Valerian knocks out Willow and after chasing Boy through the underground, takes Boy home. In Valerian's tower a swirling vortex opens up. Valerian is about to sacrifice Boy, when Kepler and Willow arrive. Kepler reveals that Boy is Valerian's son and that Boy was made that night 15 years ago, when Valerian bet on his life. Valerian, shocked, willingly walks into the vortex, and the demon claims him. Boy questions Kepler about his real father, and Kepler says that Valerian is not really Boy's father, that he just said that to save Boy. The book ends with Boy and Willow returning to the City with Kepler.

== Main characters ==
Boy was Valerians helper. Willow is an orphan who served a theatre's singer, also the one who declared Willow with 'perfect pitch.' She used to work in a gentleman's club, before she ran away, as a servant who carried their cloaks. She is described as small and having mousy brown hair. A few flashbacks reveal Willow used to live with her parents. She explains to Boy while they are imprisoned that her aunt sent her to the orphanage. She is quick-witted and often asks people too many questions. She and Boy develop a romance in The Dark Flight Down. The love that Boy and Willow share is significant throughout the books because it helps Boy, who has known only violence and hardship, to regain his spirit.

Valerian employs Boy as his 'famulus'. He tries to save himself by sacrificing Boy, but could not kill him when he thought Boy was his son. While he is described (mostly by Willow) as rude, ungrateful, unpleasant, foul-tempered, he does have a softer side, particularly toward Willow. He is the driving force of the book, and while he claims he is not a magician, he does seem to use some form of hypnosis, for instance over the Master of Burials' secretary. He is described as tall with silver hair.

Kepler is Valerian's friend from their time at the "Academy". He pretends to be working to save Valerian but ultimately realises that Valerian must die. He and Valerian fought a long time ago over a woman named Helena, and Kepler has held a grudge against Valerian since. He is described as a small, thin man with a few gold teeth.

== Sequel ==
The book has a sequel, The Dark Flight Down. It explains many of the mysteries in The Book of the Dead Days, such as the Phantom. It also takes the budding romance between Boy and Willow hinted at in The Book of Dead Days to another level, with the two confessing their love for each other at the end boy finding out who his true father is.
