= Revolver (novel) =

2009 young adult novel by Marcus Sedgwick

- Author: Marcus Sedgwick
- Audio read by: Peter Berkrot
- Language: English
- Publisher: Orion Books
- Publication date: July 16, 2009
- ISBN: 978-1-842-55186-8

Revolver is a 2009 young adult novel by Marcus Sedgwick. It was shortlisted for the Carnegie Medal and Booktrust Teenage Prize, among other honours.

== Plot ==
Revolver addresses a dilemma faced by Sig Andersson, a 15-year-old boy, as well as the circumstances that led to that dilemma.

The story opens in 1910 as Sig sits alone in a cabin near the Arctic Circle on the borders of Finland and Sweden. His father's body is lying on the table, and his sister have left to seek help; his mother was killed years earlier. As Sig awaits their return, a large man, Gunther Wolff, knocks on the door and asks for Sig's father. Soon, Wolff demands he be provided with the gold he's convinced Sig's father has stolen, and Sig fears for his life, especially since the stranger has a gun. Sig remembers his father's revolver, a prized possession he stored away. However, the boy has only shot the revolver a few times, several years ago on his birthday. Even after his sister returns, he struggles with what he should do: use the weapon against Wolff, even though Wolff is likely more skilled with his gun, or risk what Wolff may do next.

The novel alternates between snapshots of the father's story eleven years prior, providing backstory for Sig's present dilemma. In 1899, Wolff was a gold prospector where Sig's father, Einar, was working in Nome, Alaska. Believing Einar is running a scam, Wolff demanded half of Einar's proceeds. In hopes of protecting his family, Einar attempted to escape, though his wife was murdered, and presumably raped, in the process.

== Reception ==
Revolver was well received by critics, including starred reviews from Kirkus Reviews and Publishers Weekly.

Kirkus referred to the novel as "a chilling, atmospheric story that will haunt readers with its descriptions of a desolate terrain and Sig’s difficult decisions."

Publishers Weekly called Revolver a "intense survival story ... propelled by a relentless sense of danger and bone-chilling cold." Their review highlighted how Sedgwick "gracefully weav[es] in sources as diverse as the Old Testament story of Job and an 1896 ad for the revolver," noting that these references, as well as the author's skill at plot development, "lures ... readers into deeper thinking."

Mary Hoffman, writing for The Guardian, noted that while "Revolver is a very short book, ... it's not slight: the issue of whether violence is ever unavoidable is both topical and difficult, and this deceptively simple story raises enormous questions."

The audiobook received a starred review from School Library Journal, who said the narrator, Peter Berkrot, "chillingly and expertly brings to life Marcus Sedgwick's short, yet intense mystery." They highlighted how Berkot's "pitch-perfect voicing, suspenseful and satisfying pacing, and spot-on character portrayals draw listeners."

== Awards and honours ==
Revolver is a Junior Library Guild book. The Horn Book Magazine, Kirkus Reviews, and Publishers Weekly named it one of the best children's books of 2010; Bank Street College of Education named it one of the best children's books of 2011.

Awards for Revolver
Year	Award	Result	Ref.
2009	Guardian Children's Fiction Prize	Longlisted	
2010	Booktrust Teenage Prize	Shortlisted	
2010	Carnegie Medal	Shortlisted	
2011	ALA Best Fiction for Young Adults	Top 10	
2011	Michael L. Printz Award	Shortlisted	
