= The Murdstone Trilogy =

Novel by Mal Peet

- First edition
- Author: Mal Peet
- Language: English
- Genre: Fiction
- Publisher: David Fickling Books
- Publication date: 6 November 2014
- Publication place: United Kingdom
- Media type: Print (hardcover)
- ISBN: 1910200158

The Murdstone Trilogy is a novel by Mal Peet. It was the final novel completed by Peet before his death in 2015 (he was writing another book, Beck, when he died, and it was completed by his longtime friend Meg Rosoff). The Murdstone Trilogy is one of only two novels by Peet that targets adult readers, the other being Mr Godley's Phantom —the majority of the author's work was in children's literature.

The title of the book does not allude to it being part of a trilogy. Instead, it refers to a fictitious book series written by the protagonist of the novel. The book tells the story of Philip Murdstone, who is a renowned children’s writer whose best days are behind him. His agent convinces him to write a fantasy series, and an epic trilogy of stories comes to him in a dream. The new books bring him renewed success, but the fantastical stories begin to consume him.

David Fickling Books published The Murdstone Trilogy in 2014 to wide critical acclaim. It is commonly referred to as a satirical commentary on the fantasy genre.
