= National Libraries Day =

National Libraries Day is an annual event in the UK dedicated to the celebration of libraries and librarians. The inaugural event was held on 4 February 2012.

To celebrate National Libraries Day, events including author talks and competitions are organised across the country by local authorities, universities, other providers of library services and local community groups.

Channel 4's Culture Editor, Matthew Cain, described the 2012 National Libraries Day as "most important" due to the "serious concern about the future for libraries".

Children's Laureate Julia Donaldson released a poem to mark the day, adding that if we "lose libraries, we would lose readers and we would become a less literate country".

The 2013 event was scheduled to take place on 9 February 2013.

== Background ==
Following Save our Libraries Day in 2011, author and library campaigner Alan Gibbons proposed that the first day in February be made National Libraries Day after receiving emails suggesting that there should be a chance to "celebrate our libraries".

On 25 May 2011, Gibbons announced that:

We are delighted to launch National Libraries Day, a week of events in early February leading to a day of celebration of reading, libraries and librarians around the United Kingdom. A reading child is a successful child. A child who goes to the library is twice as likely to be a good reader and that child becomes a literate adult, a lifelong reader. There are 320 million visits a year to our libraries but we can make them even more popular.

— Alan Gibbons, Chartered Institute of Library and Information Professionals website

== The Library Book ==
In support of the first National Libraries Day, a book was published featuring a number of authors contributing their thoughts on why they think libraries matter. The book features contributions from Alan Bennett, Julian Barnes and Stephen Fry, with all the proceeds going to The Reading Agency to aid their work supporting libraries.

== Supporters ==
National Libraries Day is supported by a range of organisations including:

- The Bookseller
- Booktrust
- Campaign for the Book
- Chartered Institute of Library and Information Professionals
- The Library Campaign
- National Literacy Trust
- The Publishers Association
- The Reading Agency
- The Society of Authors
- Unison
- Voices for the Library
- Women's Institutes
