= Mal Peet =

English writer and illustrator (1947–2015)

- Born: 5 October 1947; North Walsham, Norfolk, England
- Died: 2 March 2015 (aged 67)
- Occupations: Writer, illustrator
- Writing career
- Period: 2003–2015
- Genres: Young adult historical fiction; children's picture books
- Notable works: Keeper: Tamar; Exposure
- Notable awards: Carnegie Medal; 2005; Guardian Prize; 2009

Malcolm Charles Peet (5 October 1947 – 2 March 2015) was an English writer and illustrator best known for young adult fiction. He has won several honours including the Brandford Boase, the Carnegie Medal and the Guardian Prize, British children's literature awards that recognise "year's best" books. Three of his novels feature football and the fictional South American sports journalist Paul Faustino. The Murdstone Trilogy (2014) and "Mr Godley's Phantom" were his first works aimed at adult readers.

== Biography ==
Peet grew up on a council estate in North Walsham, Norfolk, the eldest of three siblings, in a family that he describes as "emotionally impaired". He attended the Paston School and spent one year at the University of Warwick studying English and American literature, but graduated later, eventually earning an M.A. degree there. He worked at a variety of jobs, including writer for educational publishers, before deciding to start a novel at age 52. He lived in Exmouth, Devon with his wife Elspeth Graham and their son Tom. He also had two children, Lauren and Charlie, from a previous relationship, and there are now four grandchildren - Grace, Ezra, Nella and Frieda.

Cloud Tea Monkeys, a children's picture book written by Peet and his wife, is set in the Himalayas and based on a Chinese folktale. Kirkus Reviews observed, in review of the 2010 edition illustrated by Juan Wijngaard, "The deftly spun, emotionally resonant fairy-tale story ... begs to be read aloud. ... Unlike cloud tea, an accessible treasure."

=== Novelist ===
Walker Books published Peet's first five novels, with his latest work, The Murdstone Trilogy, being published by David Fickling Books. For his first novel, Keeper (2003), Peet won the Branford Boase Award, which recognizes "the most promising book for seven-year-olds and upwards by a first time novelist." For his second novel, Tamar (2005), he won the annual Carnegie Medal from the British librarians, recognising the year's best children's book published in the U.K. The Penalty (2007) was shortlisted for the Booktrust Teenage Prize and Peet won the Guardian Children's Fiction Prize for Exposure (2008), a modern re-telling of Shakespeare's Othello. The once-in-a-lifetime award by The Guardian newspaper is judged by a panel of British children's writers. Keeper, The Penalty, and Exposure are the Faustino books. Tamar is a World War II novel and family mystery set jointly in 1945 Nazi-occupied the Netherlands and 1995 England.

Life: An Exploded Diagram (2011), a semi-autobiographical novel, was his last book for young readers.

Susan Tranter wrote that "Mal Peet's work is notable for its refusal to submit to categories – the constraints which label what a book should be about, and who it should appeal to. His books to date prove that successful literature for young readers doesn't have to be didactic, or have overtly youthful themes, or even centre on young characters. It is the quality of the writing which is, ultimately, the most important thing." Peet says he is skeptical of books written specifically for teenagers, saying they are prone to condescension.

Peet himself stated, "I see genres as generating sets of rules or conventions that are only interesting when they are subverted or used to disguise the author’s intent. My own way of doing this is to attempt a sort of whimsical alchemy, whereby seemingly incompatible genres are brought into unlikely partnerships."

Three of Peet's books feature the fictional South American sports journalist Paul Faustino (and football). Peet's debut novel Keeper, which is primarily a world-champion goalkeeper's life story in the course of an interview. Keeper, The Penalty, and Exposure all feature Faustino and South American football players. When he won the 2009 Guardian Award for the Othello-based Exposure, he told the sponsoring newspaper he felt that "football books for children were pretty much hey." He also said, "I used to play all the time. I would play football when it was light and read when it was dark. Now I get to play football vicariously."

Peet described his creative occupation thus: "I come up here in the morning to a pleasant room in the roof of my house and imagine I'm a black South American football superstar, then I have to imagine I'm a female pop celebrity who's pregnant. It's a completely mad way to spend your time. If I did it in public I would be sectioned. Writing is a form of licensed madness." The Murdstone Trilogy (2014) and Mr Godley's Phantom represented a departure for Peet, being aimed at adult readers.

== Death ==
Peet died on 2 March 2015 from cancer, aged 67. A final novel of Peet's, titled Beck, was finished and published posthumously by his longtime friend Meg Rosoff.

== Selected works ==
- Cloud Tea Monkeys (Ragged Bears, 1999), written by Elspeth Graham and Mal Peet, illustrated by Alan Marks — "based on a Chinese folktale" ISBN 9781406333862 (pbk)
- Keeper (Walker, 2003)ISBN 9781406303933 (pbk)
- Tamar (Walker, 2005) ISBN 1406303941
- The Penalty (Walker, 2006) ISBN 9781844280995 (pbk)
- Exposure (Walker, 2008) ISBN 9781406306491 (pbk) based on the Shakespeare play Othello
- Cloud Tea Monkeys (Walker, 2010; New edition), by Graham and Peet, illus. Juan Wijngaard
- Life: An Exploded Diagram (Walker, 2011)ISBN 9781844281008 (pbk)
- The Murdstone Trilogy: an adult "nobble" (David Fickling Books, 2014 ISBN 9781910200155 (hbk)
- Beck (Walker Books, 2016, ISBN 978-1-4063-3112-7), completed by Meg Rosoff
- The Family Tree (Barrington Stoke, 2018) illustrations by Emma Shoard ISBN 978-1-78112-805-3.

== Awards ==
- 2004 Branford Boase Award – Keeper
- 2005 Carnegie Medal – Tamar
- 2006 Wirral Paper Back of the Year – Tamar
- 2009 Guardian Prize – Exposure
