= Anthony McGowan =

English author

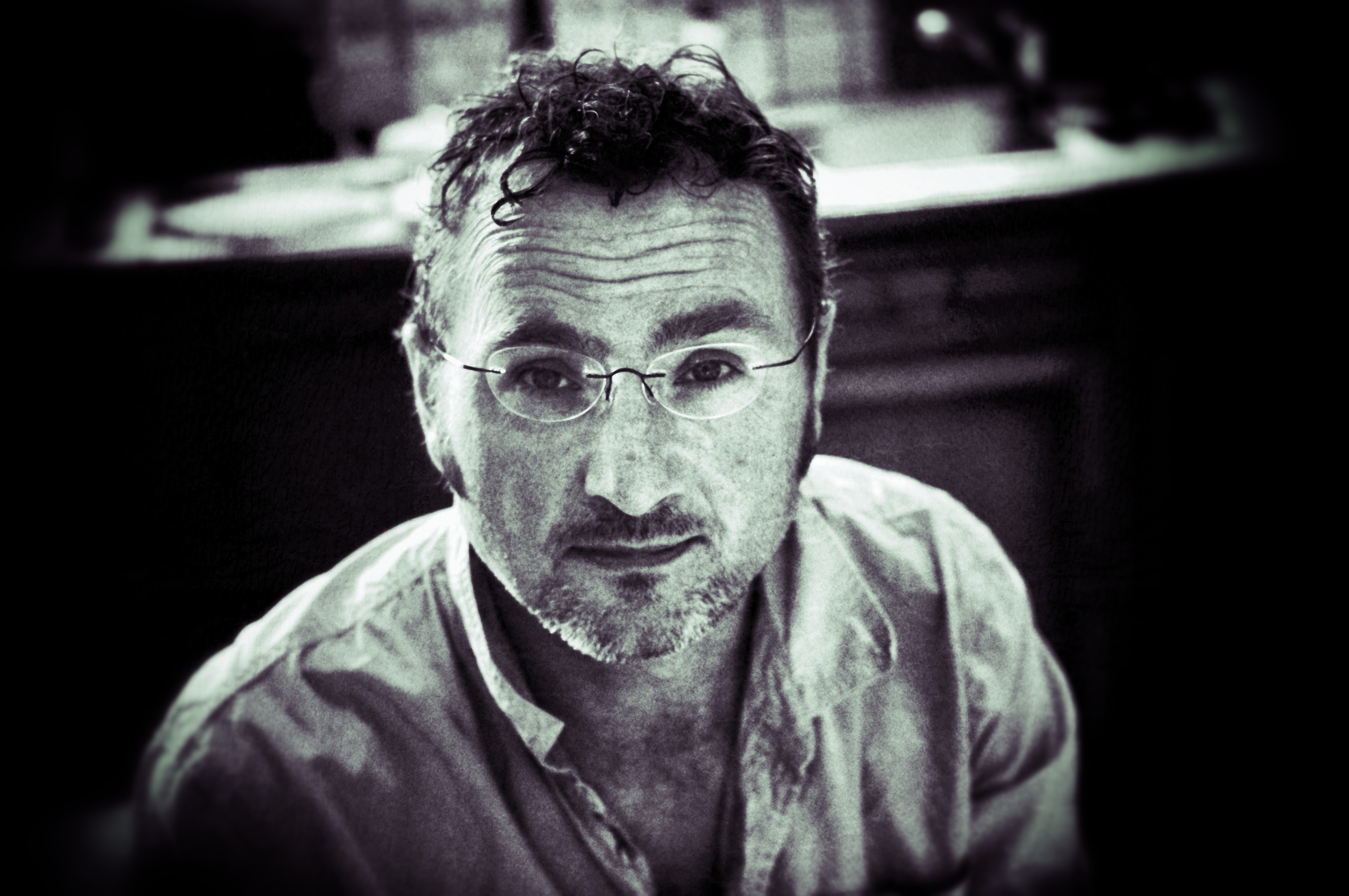
- McGowan in 2012
- Born: Anthony John McGowan; 1 January 1965 (age 61); Manchester, England
- Education: Manchester University; Open University
- Occupation: Author
- Spouse: Rebecca Campbell
- Children: 2
- Writing career
- Language: English
- Genres: Children's literature, Young adult fiction, Literary fiction, Nonfiction
- Notable works: Hellbent; The Knife That Killed Me; Henry Tumour; The Truth of Things series (Brock, Pike, Rook, Lark)
- Notable awards: Carnegie Medal (2020)
- Website: Anthony McGowan official website

Anthony John McGowan (born January 1965) is an English author of books for children, teenagers and adults. He is the winner of the 2020 CILIP Carnegie Medal for Lark.

In addition to his 2020 win, he has been twice longlisted (for The Knife That Killed Me in 2008 and Brock in 2014) and once shortlisted (for Rook in 2018) for the CILIP Carnegie Medal, and is the winner of the 2006 Booktrust Teenage Prize for Henry Tumour.

== Early life and education ==
McGowan was the second of five children born into a working-class Roman Catholic family in Manchester. His parents were both nurses and his family moved to the village of Sherburn in Elmet, outside Leeds, when he was a small child. He has said that he read primarily non-fiction nature books when he was young, but when he was nine, a teacher gave him J. R. R. Tolkien's The Lord of the Rings: "I don't think I'd ever read a novel before, not even an Enid Blyton. It took me several years to finish reading it, but afterwards, I'd become a different kind of person; one who read novels and might one day write one."

At age 11, he was sent to Corpus Christi Catholic College, a state school that he has called "one of the worst schools in Leeds...My upbringing until then had been fairly sheltered and quite rural. Suddenly I was surrounded by lots of disturbed and dangerous kids from a sink estate. Every break-time there'd be fights, and the teachers kept control with absolute brutality. On my very first day, I was talking in line outside, and the next thing I knew, I was looking up at the sky. A teacher had slapped me to the ground. It was a massive shock to the system."

His time at Corpus Christi had a profound influence on him and features prominently as inspiration in his books for young people: "I keep focusing on my school in my work because that's when stuff happened in my head. Every day was full of conflict and terror and excitement. And I wanted to make kids and their social networks the focus of all my books...But also my memories of school are seared into my mind, and they are the stuff that fiction is made of: conflict and love and hate." In 2014 he said of it "I've never really left that school. In my imagination, I'm still there. All my books are set there. When I close my eyes at night, I'm back in that classroom."

McGowan went on to study Philosophy and Politics at University of Manchester, obtaining a BA in 1986 and an M.Phil. in 1990. He earned his PhD from the Open University in 1996 with a thesis titled The sublime machine: conceptions of masculine beauty 1750-1850.

Before turning to writing full-time, he worked as a nightclub bouncer, a journalist and a civil servant.

== Writing career ==
=== Adult fiction ===
McGowan wrote his first book, the gory and violent Abandon Hope, while working as a civil servant, but it was rejected by every publisher to which he sent it. When his wife Rebecca Campbell (then working as a fashion designer and executive) wrote a successful novel about the fashion industry, her agent offered to take McGowan on as a client, as well, on condition that he write something "saner" and "more commercial".

His adult thriller Stag Hunt was published by Hodder & Stoughton in 2004 and received positive reviews. But then a mistake was made printing the barcode on the paperback edition, and all the copies had to be recalled. Paperback sales tanked as a result, and his career as an adult novelist stalled.

He would return to the genre in 2007 after finding success as a young adult author: his second adult thriller Mortal Coil (2007), was described by Kirkus Reviews as "a shady and literate thriller that oozes down-and-out ambiance."

=== Young adult fiction ===
He turned to writing books for a teenage audience and soon found success. He rewrote his first, unpublished book, Abandon Hope, to make it appropriate for teens by taking out some of the more explicit parts and re-titled it Hellbent. The comical tale of a teenager who has died and gone to Hell was published in 2005 by Random House and was shortlisted for the Branford Boase Award. The Times described it as "dazzlingly clever and disgustingly funny."

McGowan went on to win the 2006 Booktrust Teenage Prize with his next young adult book, Henry Tumour, about a boy whose brain tumor won't stop talking to him. He modeled the relationship of Henry and his tumor on that of Falstaff and young Hal in Shakespeare's Henry IV, Part 1. The Guardian said of it: "This is one teen cancer book among many, but truly it's not like any other you may have come across. For one thing, it's funny – grimly, hilariously so...Original, smart and gripping, Henry Tumour breaks all kinds of rules, and does it with irresistible brio."

His agent next suggested that he write a book inspired by a series of knife crimes that were in the news at the time. The Knife That Killed Me (2008) is the story of a 16-year-old boy whose relationship with the school bully has tragic results. The Guardian reviewed it, saying "It's believable. It's upsetting. Anthony McGowan's insight is razor-sharp. If there's an author writing for children today who can really inhabit the skin of his characters, it's McGowan...McGowan is a wonderful writer." The book was longlisted for the Guardian Children's Fiction Prize and the Carnegie Medal and shortlisted for the Booktrust Teenage Prize and the Young Minds Book Award. It was made into a film of the same title that was released in 2014.

McGowan's 2013 book Hello Darkness looked at mental illness through the story of a teenage boy accused of killing school pets. Tony Bradman reviewed it for the Guardian and wrote: "the genius of Hello Darkness...is that like Henry Tumour, which also deals with a very difficult subject, it isn't relentlessly serious, but clever and darkly funny."

He also writes books for Barrington Stoke, which specializes in short books with simple language for dyslexic and reluctant readers. He said in 2018: "Writing for Barrington Stoke definitely made me change my prose style. And, I think, it was a change for the better. My earlier books are written in a rather complex 'look at me'; sort of style. There's a lot of showing off, a lot of proving how clever I am. But writing for Barrington Stoke made me focus on the bare bones of what makes us want to read: on character (above all), on the story, on the setting." The Fall, about the dire consequences of a practical joke, was published in 2011.

He continued writing for Barrington Stoke with four novellas in The Truth of Things series about northern working-class brothers Nicky and Kenny, the older of whom is learning disabled, who deal with a troubled home life and other challenges. Brock came out in 2013, Pike in 2015, Rook in 2017 and Lark in 2019. Brock was long-listed and Rook shortlisted for the Carnegie medal and in 2020, Lark won the prize with the tale of Nicky and Kenny's battle for survival after a hike on the North Yorkshire Moors takes a dangerous turn.

Lark was the Sunday Times Children's Book of the Week. Nicolette Jones wrote of it,

"It is funny, scatological, terrifying, heartwarming and heartbreaking, and is written in everyday prose through teenage Nicky's convincing voice. The boys, whose family life has been rocky, but whose bond with each other is powerful, are touching and brave and also ordinary. McGowan creates characters whose background (working-class northern) is too little represented in fiction for young people, and he makes us know them and live their experience as if we were there."

McGowan collaborated with author Joanna Nadin on the book Everybody Hurts (2017), a love story between two teenagers of different social classes. Based on an idea by McGowan, he and Nadin took turns writing alternating chapters, with McGowan writing as the male character and Nadin as the female.

=== Children's fiction ===
In 2008, McGowan published his first book for middle readers, Einstein's Underpants and How They Saved the World. The Independent said of it "Einstein's Underpants is zany, irreverent and downright absurd - children will love it." In 2008 and 2009, he had four books in a series for children called The Bare Bum Gang published by Red Fox. The first book, The Bare Bum Gang and the Football Faceoff, was reviewed in The Telegraph by Dinah Hall, who wrote "There's a fine line between crude and funny, and McGowan treads it expertly. If this doesn't get 7- to 9-year-olds reading, nothing will."

In 2009–2010, he took part as one of the writers of a new Oxford University Press "guided reading" series designed to interest boys in reading, titled "Project X". McGowan penned approximately twenty of the titles in the series, which contains continuous adventure stories with a single set of main characters to take readers through the primary school years.

In 2011, he wrote The Donut Diaries, the first book in a trilogy which are credited to the main character, Dermot Milligan, an overweight boy threatened with being sent to Camp Fatso. The book won the Leicester Our Best Book Award 2012, and it was called "a warm, witty and inspiring tale" by the Telegraph. The sequel, The Donut Diaries: Revenge is Sweet was released in 2012, and the third in the series, The Donut Diaries: Escape from Camp Fatso came out the following year.

In 2011, it was announced that McGowan had been contracted to write four books that would revive the classic children's wildlife adventure series penned between 1949 and 1980 by the late Willard Price. The books were published between 2012 and 2014.

I Killed Father Christmas (Barrington Stoke, 2017) was his first book specifically targeted to middle readers with reading difficulties. It is the story of a boy who, after hearing his parents arguing, comes to believe that he is responsible for the death of Father Christmas, and thus must take his place.

=== Non-fiction ===
In 2017, McGowan's first book of non-fiction was published. The Art of Failing: Notes from the Underdog consisted of a series of essays from the course of one year in his life, each depicting some humorously embarrassing or bewildering event He wrote about neighborhood adventures with his Maltese dog, Monty, and the daily idiosyncrasies of parenthood and marriage. Kirkus Reviews said of it: "the author's delight in unearthing the overlooked pain points of everyday life and laughing at them makes up for the fractured, willy-nilly nature of the narrative."

In How to Teach Philosophy to Your Dog: A Quirky Introduction to the Big Questions in Philosophy (2019), McGowan utilized his PhD in philosophy in examining the teachings of history's most renowned philosophers, which he presented in a series of 'conversations' between himself and his dog, Monty. Kirkus Reviews called it "a charming, informative, unique introduction to Western philosophy". Writing in The Guardian, John Crace said of it "For essential reading on both the meaning of dogs and the meaning of life, I can recommend Anthony McGowan's wonderful book How to Teach Philosophy to Your Dog...The final chapter is a touching meditation on death and the existence – or not – of God, that takes in everything from Aristotle to Schopenhauer and leaves you suspecting dogs might already have had many of the answers all along."

=== Other writing ===
As a journalist, McGowan has written on sport, travel and culture. He has lectured on creative writing at London Metropolitan University, Royal Holloway, University of London, and The Faber Academy.

== Personal life ==
McGowan is married to novelist and London School of Economics academic Rebecca Campbell. They have two children and live in West Hampstead, London.

He was diagnosed with testicular cancer in 1986 at the age of 21 and told his chance of survival was a percentage "in the low teens". He wrote an article for Wisden Cricket Monthly in 2019 about how listening to the Ashes cricket series on the radio helped get him through the ordeal.

He plays for the Authors Cricket Club with a number of other British writers. He contributed a chapter on social class divisions and the game of cricket to the book that team members collectively wrote to commemorate their first season of playing together, The Authors XI: A Season of English Cricket from Hackney to Hambledon. In 2013, he hit the first century (100+ runs in a single inning) of his life in a game against the Actors Cricket Club, a feat he later recounted in an article for the cricket journal The Nightwatchman.

== Books ==
=== Non-fiction for adults ===
- —— (2013). The Authors XI: A Season of English Cricket from Hackney to Hambledon. Chapter: "Cricket and Class". Bloomsbury Publishing. ISBN 9781408840450.
- —— (2017). The Art of Failing: Notes from the Underdog. Oneworld Publications. ISBN 9781786071828.
- —— (2019). How to Teach Philosophy to Your Dog: A Quirky Introduction to the Big Questions in Philosophy. Oneworld Publications. ISBN 9781786076748.

=== Fiction for adults ===
- —— (2004). Stag Hunt. Hodder & Stoughton. ISBN 9780340830444.
- —— (2007). Mortal Coil. Hodder & Stoughton. ISBN 9780340830475.

=== Fiction for young adults ===
- —— (2005). Hellbent. Doubleday. ISBN 9780385608602.
- —— (2006). Henry Tumour. Definitions. ISBN 9780099488231.
- —— (2008). The Knife That Killed Me. Definitions. ISBN 9780385738224.
- —— (2011). The Fall. Barrington Stoke. ISBN 9781842994863.
- —— (2013). Hello Darkness. Walker Books. ISBN 9781406337846.
- ——; Nadin, Joanna (2017). Everybody Hurts. Hachette. ISBN 9780349002910.
- —— (2021). I Am the Minotaur. Oxford University Press. ISBN 9780198494874.
- —— (2022). Dogs of the Deadlands. Oneworld. ISBN 9780861543267.

==== The Truth of Things series ====
- —— (2013). Brock. Barrington Stoke. ISBN 9781781122082.
- —— (2015). Pike. Barrington Stoke. ISBN 9781781124666.
- —— (2017). Rook. Barrington Stoke. ISBN 9781781127230.
- —— (2019). Lark. Barrington Stoke. ISBN 9781781128435.

=== Fiction for children ===
- —— (2008). Einstein's Underpants and How They Saved the World. Yearling. ISBN 9780440869245.
- —— (2017). I Killed Father Christmas. Barrington Stoke. ISBN 9781781127100.

==== The Bare Bum Gang series ====
- —— (2008). The Bare Bum Gang and the Football Faceoff. Red Fox. ISBN 9781862303867.
- —— (2008). The Bare Bum Gang Battle the Dogsnatchers. Red Fox. ISBN 9781862303874.
- —— (2009). The Bare Bum Gang and the Valley of Doom. Red Fox. ISBN 9781862303881.
- —— (2009). The Bare Bum Gang and the Holy Grail. Red Fox. ISBN 9781862303898.

==== Project X series ====
- —— (2009). The X-bots Are Coming... Oxford University Press. ISBN 9780198302827.
- —— (2009). Attack of the X-bots!. Oxford University Press. ISBN 9780198302834.
- —— (2009). Lone Wolf. Oxford University Press. ISBN 9780198302803.
- —— (2009). Ant Storm. Oxford University Press. ISBN 9780198302902.
- —— (2009). Ant Attack. Oxford University Press. ISBN 9780198302919.
- —— (2009). Stage Fright. Oxford University Press. ISBN 9780198471943.
- —— (2009). Riding the Waves. Oxford University Press. ISBN 9780198302193.
- —— (2009). Hamster Rampage. Oxford University Press. ISBN 9780198302186.
- —— (2009). Tasmanian Terror. Oxford University Press. ISBN 9780198303718.
- —— (2009). Operation Shipwreck. Oxford University Press. ISBN 9780198476047.
- —— (2009). Exploring the Deep. Oxford University Press. ISBN 9780198476030.
- —— (2009). The Chase. Oxford University Press. ISBN 9780198472018.
- —— (2009). Divided We Fall. Oxford University Press. ISBN 9780198302261.
- —— (2010). Ballerina of Doom. Oxford University Press. ISBN 9780198302599.
- —— (2010). Toyshop Terror. Oxford University Press. ISBN 9780198302582.
- —— (2014). The Snatcher. Oxford University Press. ISBN 9780198394082.
- —— (2014). X-bot Reboot. Oxford University Press. ISBN 9780198393924.
- —— (2014). Revenge of the X-bots!. Oxford University Press. ISBN 9780198303060.
- —— (2014). A New Alliance. Oxford University Press. ISBN 9780198394242.
- —— (2014). A Dangerous Game. Oxford University Press. ISBN 9780198394167.

==== The Donut Diaries series ====
- —— (2011). The Donut Diaries. Corgi Children's. ISBN 9780552564373.
- —— (2012). The Donut Diaries: Revenge is Sweet. Corgi Children's. ISBN 9780552564397.
- —— (2013). The Donut Diaries: Escape from Camp Fatso. Corgi Children's. ISBN 9780552564403.

==== Willard Price books ====
- —— (2012). Leopard Adventure. Puffin Books. ISBN 9780141339450.
- —— (2013). Shark Adventure. Puffin Books. ISBN 9780141339481.
- —— (2013). Bear Adventure. Puffin Books. ISBN 9780141339511.
- —— (2014). Python Adventure. Puffin Books. ISBN 9780141339535.
