= Alan Gibbons =

English children's writer

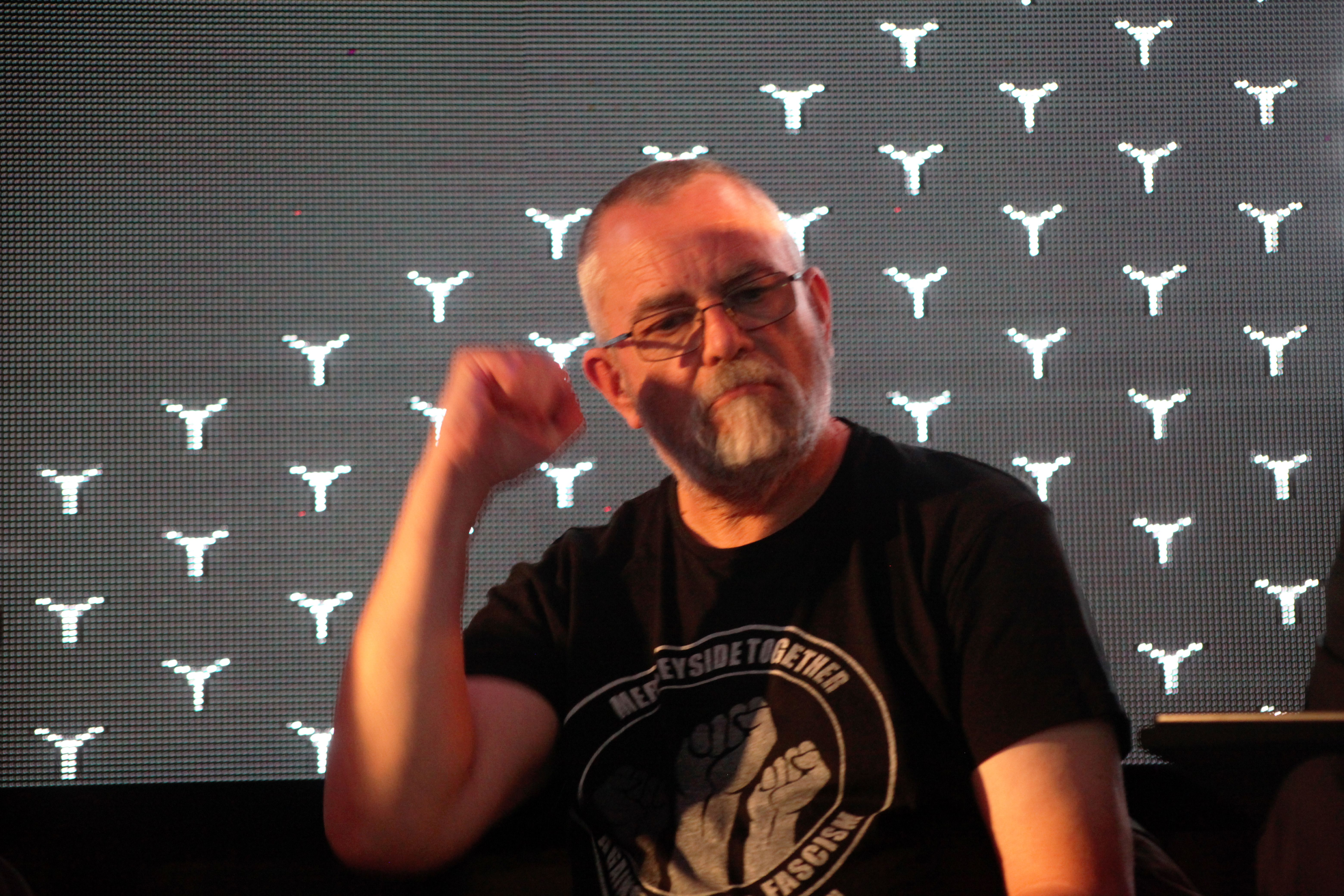
- Gibbons at The World Transformed 2018 in Liverpool

Leader of the Liverpool Community Independents
- Incumbent
- Assumed office 2023
- Deputy: Sam Gorst
- Preceded by: Anna Rothery

Deputy Leader of the Liverpool Community Independents
- In office 5 May 2022 – 2023
- Leader: Anna Rothery
- Preceded by: Office established
- Succeeded by: Sam Gorst

Liverpool City Councillor for Orrell Park
- Incumbent
- Assumed office 4 May 2023
- Preceded by: Ward established
- Majority: 1,068 (57.6%)

Liverpool City Councillor for Warbreck
- In office 6 May 2021 – 4 May 2023
- Preceded by: Vacant (Note: Cllr Richard McLinden died of COVID-19 in November 2020. No by-election was held due to restrictions imposed during the pandemic and his seat was vacant until the 2021 election.)
- Succeeded by: Ward disestablished

Personal details
- Born: 14 August 1953 (age 73) Warrington, Lancashire, England
- Party: Liverpool Community Independents (2022–present)
- Other political affiliations: Socialist Workers Party (1974–1996); Labour (2016–2022); Transform (2023–2025); Your Party (2025–present)
- Occupation: Novelist, educational consultant
- Writing career
- Children: 4
- Years active: 1988–present
- Genre: Children's literature
- Notable works: Shadow of the Minotaur, The Edge
- Notable awards: Blue Peter Book Award; 2000 Shadow of the Minotaur
- Website: alangibbons.com

Alan Albert Gibbons (born 14 August 1953) is an English politician, writer of children's books and campaigner known for his advocacy of libraries.

He has written over 60 books and won a number of awards including a Blue Peter Book Award for his best-selling book Shadow of the Minotaur.

Gibbons lives in Liverpool, England, where he worked as a primary school teacher and where he is a local councillor.

== Early life and career ==
Gibbons was born in Warrington, Cheshire. His father was a farm labourer, but was badly hurt in an accident when Alan was eight years old. The family had to move to Crewe, Cheshire.

Gibbons worked as a journalist and in a number of factory jobs before training to be a teacher in his mid-thirties.

== Literary career ==
While working as a teacher in Knowsley, Gibbons started writing short stories for his students. Later, he began to write professionally.

Best known for writing children's and young adult fiction, Gibbons has written over 60 books, which have been translated into dozens of languages. He has won numerous awards including a Blue Peter Book Award, Angus Book Award and Leicester Book of the Year Award, and was twice shortlisted for a Carnegie Medal.

He has been a regular speaker at the Edinburgh Book Festival, the London Book Fair, the Northern Children's Book Festival, the Hay on Wye Literary Festival, the Cheltenham Literature Festival and others. Gibbons also works as an educational consultant and speaks at schools across the UK and abroad. In addition to his writing, Gibbons is a frequent speaker on education and literacy issues, and has appeared on numerous television and radio programs.

Gibbons' work often deal with issues such as racism, poverty and social justice. In Socialist Review, Michael Rosen said that Gibbons’ novels focus mainly on the lives of "working-class children and teenagers". His stories are fast-moving and often include moments in which the protagonists make "personal socio-political choices."

== Campaign against library closures ==
In 2010, Gibbons founded the Campaign for the Book to promote reading and libraries, and to lobby for better funding and support for library services. He strongly criticised the Conservative and Liberal Democrat Coalition Government's austerity policies and funding cuts, which would see almost 800 public libraries close.

As part of this campaign, Gibbons initiated countrywide 'read ins' to protest against library closures, which he described as a "cultural crime". Some 110 events took place across the country, involving up to 10,000 people.

In 2011, he launched a new initiative, calling for a National Libraries Day to celebrate reading for pleasure and library services. This rapidly won the backing of many organisations for an annual event on the first Saturday in February, and eventually evolved into National Libraries Week.

Gibbons and the Campaign for the Book are part of the Speak Up for Libraries Coalition. In 2016, he joined Disabled People Against Cuts and three trade unions, Unison, Unite the Union and the Public and Commercial Services Union, in organising a National Demonstration for Libraries, Museums and Galleries. It was attended by 2,500 people.

== Politics ==
In addition to his work as a writer and library campaigner, Gibbons is a lifelong socialist and trade unionist.

In 1974, Gibbons joined the International Socialists, forerunner to the Socialist Workers Party, where he was an organiser and member of the National Committee, before becoming disillusioned and leaving the party in 1996. He was President of Knowsley National Union of Teachers (NUT) and a member of the Anti-Nazi League.

Gibbons organised Authors Against SATs, which campaigned for the abolition of the SATs testing regime. In 2010, the group released a statement supporting teaching unions' decision to boycott the tests.

Inspired by Jeremy Corbyn's 2015 leadership campaign, Gibbons joined the Labour Party in 2016 and became Secretary of Liverpool Walton Constituency Labour Party (CLP), Labour's safest seat in the country. In 2021, he was elected as Liverpool Councillor for Warbreck ward in north Liverpool, where he lives.

During his time in the Labour Party, Gibbons served on Momentum's National Coordinating Group for two years and spoke at many left-wing rallies and events including The World Transformed. He was briefly suspended from the party in 2020 for allowing a motion in support of Corbyn to be passed at a CLP meeting.

In March 2022, Gibbons was among a group of seven Liverpool Labour councillors who broke the whip to vote against the ruling party's proposed budget for Liverpool City Council. In his speech, he said: "Liverpool’s communities are at breaking point. As a matter of conscience, I am not prepared to vote for cuts that will make life harder for the people I represent".

The councillors who took part in the rebellion were suspended by the Labour Party. Shortly after, Gibbons was expelled. The party claimed this was because he had given an interview to the left-wing Socialist Appeal, which was proscribed by the party leadership.

Following his expulsion from the Labour Party, Gibbons became deputy leader of the Liverpool Community Independents group of councillors on Liverpool City Council. In the 2023 Liverpool City Council election, Gibbons was re-elected as an independent for the new Orrell Park ward with 77% of the vote, beating the Labour candidate by 1068 votes. He was one of three Liverpool Community Independent councillors to be elected. In November 2023 Gibbons joined a new party, Transform, as the Liverpool Community Independents had merged into them.

In 2025, Gibbons joined the new party of the left in Britain, provisionally known as Your Party (UK). He has played a central role in the preliminary organising stages which drew criticism from some factions.

== Awards and honours ==
In 2000, Gibbons won a Blue Peter Book Award in 'The Book I Couldn't Put Down' category for Shadow of the Minotaur. He was a judge for the 2001 Blue Peter Book Awards.

He was shortlisted for the Carnegie Medal twice in 2001 and 2003, and shortlisted twice for the Booktrust Teenage Prize. He has also won the Leicester Book of the Year, the Stockport Book Award, the Angus Book Award, the Catalyst Award, the Birmingham Chills Award, the Salford Young Adult Book Award, the Hackney Short Novel Prize, the Our Best Book Award and the Salford Librarians' Special Award.

In 2016, Gibbons was given the Fred and Anne Jarvis Award by the NUT for his campaigning to defend school libraries.

== Personal life ==
Gibbons lives in Liverpool with his wife and children. The eldest of his four children, Joe, died in a motorcycle accident in 2018.

== Bibliography ==
- Whose Side Are You On? (1988)
- Pig (1990)
- Our Peculiar Neighbour (1990)
- The Jaws of the Dragon (1991)
- S. O. S. Save Our Santa (1992)
- A Dagger in the Sky (1992)
- Chicken (1993)
- Not Yeti (1994)
- Grandad's Ears (1994)
- City of Fire (1995)
- Ganging Up (1995)
- The Climbing Boys (1995)
- A Street of Tall People (1995)
- When My Ship Came in (1995)
- Playing with Fire (1996)
- Total Football: Some You Win... (1997)
- Total Football: Under Pressure (1997)
- Total Football: Divided We Fall (1998)
- Total Football: Injury Time (1998)
- Power Play (1998)
- Last Man Standing (1998)
- Twin Strikers (1999)
- Final Countdown (1999)
- A Fight to Belong (1999)
- The Guv'nor (1999)
- The Legendeer: Shadow of the Minotaur (2000)
- The Legendeer: Vampyr Legion (2000)
- The Legendeer: Warriors of the Raven (2001)
- Julie and Me and Michael Owen Make Three (2001)
- Treble Trouble (2002)
- The Cold Heart of Summer (2002)
- The Edge (2002)
- Deathriders (2003)
- Caught in the Crossfire (2003)
- The Dark Beneath (2003)
- The Defender (2004)
- The Lost Boys' Appreciation Society (2004)
- The Night Hunger (2004)
- Blood Pressure (2005)
- Hold On (2005)
- Teach Me to Write Fiction (2005)
- Teach Me to Write Non Fiction (2005)
- Teach Me to Write Poetry (2005)
- The Greatest (2006)
- Setting of a Cruel Sun (2006)
- Rise of the Blood Moon (2006)
- Scared to Death (July 2007)
- The Darkwing Omnibus (October 2007)
- The Legendeer Trilogy (February 2008)
- The Demon Assassin (2008)
- Renegade (2009)
- Witch Breed (2010)
- The Number Seven Shirt (2008)
- Moving on (2009)
- The Dying Photo (2010)
- Dark Spaces (2009)
- Rib Ticklers (2010)
- An Act of Love (2011)
- Raining Fire (2013)
- Hate (2014)
- End Game (2014)
- Read On series (2013-2014)
- Weirdibeasts
  - Weird School Day with Rachel and Megan Gibbons (2015)
  - Weird Snowy Day (2016)
  - Weird Spooky Day (2016)
- Street Corner Dad (2015)
- Hate (2014)
- The ISIS Trap (2016)
- The Lion Roars (2016)
- Forget Me Not (2016)
- The Beautiful Game (2017)
- Winds of October (2017)
- 100 Ways to Write a Book (2022)
