= The Medici Seal =

2006 young adult novel by Theresa Breslin

- First edition
- Author: Theresa Breslin
- Language: English
- Genre: Child
- Publisher: Doubleday
- Publication date: 3 August 2006
- Publication place: United Kingdom
- Media type: Print (Hardback & Paperback)
- Pages: 485 pp
- ISBN: 978-0-385-61020-9
- OCLC: 67374520

The Medici Seal is a 2006 young adult novel written by Theresa Breslin. Set among the cultural life and political intrigues of Renaissance Italy, it is the story of a boy who initially calls himself Matteo and his master Leonardo da Vinci.

It was shortlisted for the 2007 Booktrust Teenage Prize and longlisted for the 2007 Carnegie Medal.

== Plot introduction ==
Italy, 1502. Ten-year-old Matteo is saved from drowning by friends of Leonardo da Vinci. The artist and scholar takes the boy under his wing. Matteo accompanies him both as he pursues knowledge and paints magnificent pictures and as he travels across Italy. Soon his story continues. Serving Leonardo da Vinci, seeing first hand the ruthless rule of Cesare Borgia, the ambition of the Medici and the revenge of the dell'Orte. Florence, Milan, Castell Barta and many other places in Renaissance Italy.

== See also ==
- Cultural references to Leonardo da Vinci
