= The Ghosts of Heaven =

2014 book by Marcus Sedgwick

- Author: Marcus Sedgwick
- Language: English
- Genre: Young adult novel, Historical fiction novel, science fiction novel
- Publisher: Roaring Brook Press
- Publication date: 6 January 2015
- Pages: 360
- ISBN: 9781626721258 Hardcover

The Ghosts of Heaven is a novel by Marcus Sedgwick, published on 2 October 2014. The book is divided into four brief quarters, with each part telling a different story. The book circles around the idea "Spirals are everywhere". The story begins in the past and ends in the future, essentially the development of mankind. The novel was shortlisted for the 2015 Carnegie Medal and was designated an Honor Book at the Michael L. Printz Award of 2016.

The first story is written in verse, from the perspective of a cave girl. The second quartet describes the life of a girl living in a small village in medieval Europe, who is later accused of witchcraft. The third quarter is about a man who has lost his wife and is conducting research on a mental asylum, and the final story is from the perspective of a man in the far future who is controlling a ship holding 500 people in deep sleep. They are headed for a distant planet and on this journey, the man discovers that he has been victim to misinformation on the government's behalf. It ends with the man landing on a planet he stumbles across during the ship's journey, and it is implied this planet is that on which the first quartet took place.

An author's note at the beginning of the book tells the reader that the four stories may be read in any of the twenty-four different orders, with each making a slightly different type of sense.

== Reception ==
The Ghosts of Heaven is a Junior Library Guild book.

The novel received starred reviews from Booklist, Kirkus Reviews, School Library Journal.

Kirkus called the novel "haunting," saying, "this complex masterpiece is for sophisticated readers of any age." Booklist wrote,

Each story is linked only tenuously, emitting mere echoes in the others, but those tenuous links leave ominous gaps that are heavy with significance. The aesthetic beauty of the spiral is pivotal, to be sure, but as Sedgwick notes the ubiquity of the shape—as a powerful sign, a healing comfort, a menacing horror, a frightening message—he also imparts its beauty and power with a growing sense of awesome terror, as if the more we contemplate the beautiful, infinite spiral, the harder it is to bear. This is profoundly heady stuff, and Sedgwick twines the threads together effortlessly in sparely written, gorgeous lines that tug at something deeper than heartstrings. It’s a graceful exploration of a sometimes comforting, sometimes distressing mystery of the universe, and the unsettling combination of meaning and emptiness will linger long after the last page.

Publishers Weekly also reviewed the book, saying, "Sedgwick ... doesn’t shy from the tragedy inherent in human interaction; these are not cheerful stories, and their protagonists don’t fare well, although their deeds resonate in small ways through history. Readers who like untangling puzzles will enjoy parsing the threads knitting together this corkscrew of tales."

Awards for The Ghosts of Heaven
Year	Award	Category	Result	Ref
2014	Costa Book Award	Children's Book	Shortlisted	
2015	Booklist Editors' Choice	—	Won	
2015	YA Book Prize	—	Nominated	
2016	Carnegie Medal	—	Shortlisted	
2016	Michael L. Printz Award	—	Honor	
