= Divided City =

2005 novel by Theresa Breslin

- First edition
- Author: Theresa Breslin
- Language: English
- Genre: Young adult
- Publisher: Doubleday
- Publication date: 5 May 2005
- Publication place: United Kingdom
- Media type: Print (Hardback & Paperback)
- Pages: 230 pp
- ISBN: 978-0-552-55188-5

Divided City is a novel written by Theresa Breslin and published on 5 May 2005 by Doubleday. The novel is written for teenagers and adults concerning the problems of sectarianism in Glasgow and racism against asylum seekers.

The main characters are young boys called Graham, a Protestant supporting Rangers. Joe, a Catholic supporting Celtic, and a young asylum seeker named Kyoul.

== See also ==
- Sectarianism in Glasgow
- Orange walk
- Old Firm
