= Terri Paddock =

American novelist

Terri Paddock is an American writer and arts journalist, based in the UK since 1991. A former PR executive, she became editor of the Whatsonstage.com, a portal website about the British theatre, in 1996. She left that position in 2013. She has also served as London correspondent of the American theatre periodical Playbill.

Paddock has written two books, Beware the Dwarfs and Come Clean. The latter was nominated for the Booktrust Teenage Prize in 2005.
