= The Edge (novel) =

2002 young adult novel written by Alan Gibbons

- First edition cover
- Author: Alan Gibbons
- Language: English
- Genre: Young adult novel
- Publisher: Orion
- Publication date: 9 July 2002
- Publication place: United Kingdom
- Pages: 192
- ISBN: 978-1-84255-094-6
- OCLC: 59498003

The Edge is a 2002 young adult novel written by Alan Gibbons. The book tells the story of Danny Mangam, a teenage boy living in an abusive home. After Danny and his mother escape her abusive boyfriend, he also confronts a number of problems caused by his mixed ancestry. The novel was shortlisted for the Carnegie Medal and won the Angus Book Award in 2004.

== Synopsis ==
The story begins in London as Danny and his mother, Cathy Mangam, are fleeing from Chris Kane, Cathy's cruel boyfriend. Chris pursues the pair to the local tube station, but they manage to escape to an area of the country known as "the Edge", where Danny's grandparents, Joan and Harry, live.

At first, Harry refuses to accept Danny, as he not only has mixed parentage but is also the result of an unplanned teenage pregnancy. As the book progresses, however, Harry grows to accept Danny as his grandson.

At school, Danny befriends and later dates a girl called Nikki. This causes trouble for Danny, because she is also loved by another teen called Steve Parker, who is a racist bully. Nikki warns Danny not provoke Steve; it is implied that Steve and his gang had been responsible for an arson attack on a store with coloured owners. Nonetheless, Danny enters an altercation with Steve and his gang and is saved by a man named Des, who is revealed to be Danny's real father.

Meanwhile, Chris, being highly possessive, continues to search for Cathy and Danny. Though Cathy initially is able to conceal their hiding place from him, a newspaper article eventually gives Chris a clue. After deducing where they are hiding, Chris makes his way to Danny's grandparents' house and shows up one day at Danny's new school. After pursuing Danny back to their house, Chris attempts to kidnap Cathy by force. During the struggle, the police arrive; Chris is arrested and imprisoned. Following this, the novel concludes with Danny having a happy family and a pleasant life.

== Characters ==
=== Danny Mangam ===
Danny is the main character of the book; he is mixed race teenager and is often treated unfairly as a result, even by his grandfather. At the outset of the novel, Danny is portrayed as anxious and uncertain as a result of abused by Chris Kane and he felt uncomfortable when he first arrived to the promise land. Later in the narrative, Danny gains confidence and self-esteem after escaping from Chris who mistreated them. After adjusting to his new home, Danny at first ignores the taunts of an unfriendly neighbor, Steve Parker and felt comfortable and happy in the ‘promise land.’

=== Catherine Mangam ===
Cathy, who gave birth to Danny when she was sixteen years old, is shown to be a loving and caring person. After she and her son suffer prolonged abuse from her boyfriend, Chris, Cathy often worries about how Danny has been affected by what he was forced to go through. Cathy's father resented her for her teenage pregnancy, and extended his anger towards Danny after he was born. Part of this anger is also based on his racial prejudice. In contrast, Cathy's mother, Joan, has accepted her and does not linger on events in the past.

=== Joan Mangam ===
Joan is Cathy's mother, and thus Danny's grandmother. She is initially unhappy with her husband Harry when he drives Cathy away following Cathy's pregnancy. After Cathy and Danny return to their household, Joan grows to love Harry again when he begins to stand up for the two.

=== Chris Kane ===
Chris Kane is a tall, lean man who is violent and very possessive of his girlfriend, Cathy. When Cathy and her son escape, Chris, likely being mentally unstable, vows to hunt them down. Throughout the novel, Danny refers to him as 'the Animal'. At times, Chris can be charming, though he often loses control of his temper. In the past, Chris has already had several brushes with the law, and ends up imprisoned in the novel. Despite this, he remains deranged and continues to desire control of Cathy and Danny. Chris also refers to himself as ‘Chrissy Boy’ and others refer to him as ‘the animal.’

=== Nikki Jones ===
Nikki Jones is initially Danny's friend, and becomes his love interest because he finds her attractive and appealing. She is described as having strawberry blonde hair.

=== Steve Parker ===
Steve Parker lives beside Joan and Harry's home. After Danny moves to his grandparents' house, Steve and his friends Craig and Jamie treat Danny very unpleasantly because of Danny's skin color. It is implied that Steve was once involved in vandalizing the businesses of Asian property owners. Partway through the novel, Steve suffers a broken nose when Danny punches him in retaliation for a racist comment.

=== Des ===
Des is Danny's father. He appears several times throughout the book: his first appearance in the novel is in a coffee Elmo shop where Cathy works. After Cathy leaves following her affair with Des, Des marries another woman and they have another child. His new wife leaves him, however, when she discovers that Des' affair with Cathy occurred when she was only sixteen years old. Throughout his life, Danny has desperately wanted to meet Des, and finally does after Des rescues Danny from a fight with Steve's gang.
