= Marcus Sedgwick =

British writer and illustrator (1968–2022)

- Born: 8 April 1968; Preston, Kent, England
- Died: 15 November 2022 (aged 54); France
- Education: University of Bath
- Writing career
- Genres: Fantasy, science fiction, horror, young adult
- Notable awards: Michael L. Printz Award; 2014 Midwinterblood Booktrust Teenage Prize; 2007 My Swordhand Is Singing Branford Boase Award; 2001 Floodland

Marcus Sedgwick (8 April 1968 – 15 November 2022) was a British writer and illustrator. He authored several young adult and children's books and picture books, a work of nonfiction and several novels for adults, and illustrated a collection of myths and a book of folk tales for adults. According to School Library Journal his "most acclaimed titles" were those for young adults.

His novel Floodland (2001) won the Branford Boase Award and The Dark Horse (2002) was shortlisted for the Guardian Children's Fiction Prize. The first U.S. edition of his 2011 novel Midwinterblood won the 2014 Michael L. Printz Award from the American Library Association.

== Early life ==
Marcus Sedgwick was born 8 April 1968 in Preston, a small village in East Kent, England. He has one brother, Julian, and a half-sister, Ellie. As a child he was shy and recalled being bullied at Sir Roger Manwood's School in Sandwich, Kent an all-boys grammar school.

His mother had once worked in Machynlleth at the Centre for Alternative Technology; the area was the setting for Susan Cooper's fantasy series The Dark Rising, and Sedgwick called those books influential for him. He was also influenced by Mervyn Peake’s Gormenghast series, which his father had introduced him to.

He studied mathematics and politics at the University of Bath. His father died when Sedgwick was twenty years old.

== Career ==
Before becoming a full-time author, Sedgwick worked as a bookseller at Heffers, a children's bookstore, and in sales at children's publishers Ragged Bears and Walker Books. According to The Guardian he began writing "seriously" in 1994.

His first book, Floodland, was published in 2000, and it received the Branford Boase Award for the best debut children's novel of that year. Floodland tells the story of Zoe, who lives on her own on an island that used to be part of England before global warming caused the seas to rise. Publishers Weekly said that "Despite some page-turning chapters, Zoe and her story lack the credibility to sustain readers through the contradictory themes and sometimes unimaginative prose." Alternative Magazine said it was "a stunning debut novel that precluded more literary brilliance to follow."

Dark Horse (2001) was shortlisted for several awards. My Swordhand Is Singing (2006) won a Booktrust Teenage Prize.

In 2013 he released Dark Satanic Mills, a graphic novel written in conjunction with his brother Julian Sedgwick and illustrated by John Higgins. His 2015 book The Ghosts of Heaven, a work of young adult fiction consisting of four loosely connected parts combined into an "intriguing" novel, according to Sarah McCarry writing for The New York Times.

He won numerous awards for his writing, most notably the Michael L. Printz Award in 2011 for Revolver, 2014 for Midwinter Blood, and 2016 for The Ghosts of Heaven. At the time of his death he was the most-nominated author for America's most prestigious book prize for writing for young adults. In addition to writing, Sedgwick worked on film and book projects with his brother Julian. He was represented by RCW Literary Agency.

Sedgwick taught creative writing at Bath Spa University as a writer in residence from 2011 through 2014 and wrote reviews for the Guardian newspaper.

== Reception ==
Kirkus Reviews, in reviewing his 2016 Saint Death, called out Sedgwick's "characteristic precision of English prose". According to The Guardian, after the 2006 appearance of My Swordhand Is Singing, his works were "regularly on the shortlist for every major award for his subsequent titles", and although seldom receiving major awards were "always critically acclaimed, much admired by other writers and popular with readers".

=== Awards ===
- 2001 Branford Boase Award – Floodland
- 2001 Edgar Awards nomination – Witch Hill
- 2007 North East Teenage Book Award – The Foreshadowing
- 2007 Portsmouth Book Award – The Foreshadowing
- 2007 Booktrust Teenage Prize – My Swordhand Is Singing
- 2007 Renfrewshire Book Award – My Swordhand Is Singing
- 2011 Blue Peter Book Award (Best Book with Pictures) – Lunatics and Luck
- 2011 Michael L. Printz Award – Revolver
- 2013 Rotherham Book Awards (Lower Age Category) – Fright Forest
- 2014 Michael L. Printz Award – Midwinterblood
- 2015 Essex Book Award – She Is Not Invisible
- 2015 Oxfordshire Book Award – She Is Not Invisible
- 2015 Rib Valley Book Award – She Is Not Invisible
- 2015 Spellbinding Book Award – She Is Not Invisible
- 2016 Michael L. Printz Award – The Ghosts of Heaven

== Personal life ==
Sedgwick was married and divorced three times. He had a daughter, Alice, with his first wife Kate Agnew.

In addition to drawing and writing, Sedgwick played the drums and was an avid music lover. Some of his favorite writers include Susan Cooper, Thomas Mann and Arthur Schnitzler.

In 2014, Sedgwick was diagnosed with chronic fatigue syndrome, also known as myalgic encephalomyelitis. After his diagnosis, he moved to the French Alps and then to Dordogne. His final work before his death was the nonfiction book All In Your Head: What Happens When Your Doctor Doesn’t Believe You? Sedgwick died in France on 15 November 2022, at the age of 54.

== Publications ==
=== Young adult novels ===
- Floodland (Delacorte Press, 2000) ISBN 9780385328012
- The Dark Horse (Wendy Lamb Books, 2001) ISBN 9780385730549
- The Foreshadowing (Orion Children's Books, 2005) ISBN 9781842552179
- Blood Red, Snow White (Orion Children's Books, 2007) ISBN 9781842551844
- Revolver (Orion, 2009) ISBN 9781842551868
- White Crow (Orion, 2010) ISBN 9781842551875
- Midwinterblood (Indigo, 2011) ISBN 9781780620091
- She Is Not Invisible (Orion Children's Books, 2013) ISBN 9781444000504
- The Ghosts of Heaven (Roaring Brook Press, 2015) ISBN 9781626721258
- Killing the Dead (Indigo, 2015) ISBN 9781780622392
- Saint Death (Orion Children's Books, 2016) ISBN 9781444000528
- Snowflake, AZ (Norton Young Readers, 2019) ISBN 9781324004417
- Dark Peak (Oxford University Press, 2021) ISBN 9780198494973
- Wrath (Barrington Stoke, 2022) ISBN 9781800900899

==== Dead Days ====
- The Book of Dead Days (Orion, 2003) ISBN 9781842552179
- The Dark Flight Down (Orion Children's Books, 2004) ISBN 9781842552186ã

==== Swordhand ====
- My Swordhand Is Singing (Orion Children's Books, 2006) ISBN 9781842551837
- The Kiss of Death (Orion Children's Books, 2008) ISBN 9781842551851

=== Children's books ===
- Witch Hill (Delacorte Books for Young Readers, 2001) ISBN 9780385328029
- A Winter's Tale. Illustrated by Simon Bartram. (Templar, 2003) ISBN 9781840113075

==== Raven Mysteries ====
- Flood and Fang (Orion Children's Books, 2009) ISBN 9781842556924
- Ghosts and Gadgets (Orion Children's Books, 2009) ISBN 9781842556948
- Lunatics and Luck (Orion Children's Books, 2010) ISBN 9781842556955
- Vampires and Volts (Orion Children's Books, 2010) ISBN 9781842556962
- Magic and Mayhem (Orion Children's Books, 2011) ISBN 9781842556979
- Diamond and Doom (Orion Children's Books, 2011) ISBN 9781842556986

==== Cudweed ====
- Cudweed's Birthday (Hachette Children's Group, 2011) ISBN 9781444003192
- Cudweed in Outer Space (Hachette Children's Group, 2012) ISBN 9781444004830
- Cudweed's Time Machine (Hachette Children's Group, 2013) ISBN 9781444004847

==== Elf Girl and Raven Boy ====
- Fright Forest (Orion Children's Books, 2012) ISBN 9781444004854
- Monster Mountains (Hachette Children's Group, 2012) ISBN 9781444004861
- Scream Sea (Orion Children's Books, 2013) ISBN 9781444005257
- Dread Desert (Hachette Children's Group, 2013) ISBN 9781444005264
- Terror Town (Hachette Children's Group, 2014) ISBN 9781444005271
- Creepy Caves (Orion Children's Books, 2015) ISBN 9781444005288

=== Picture books ===
- A Christmas Wish (Dutton, Penguin, 2003) ISBN 9781437967616
- The Emperor's New Clothes. Jay Alison, illustrator (Chronicle Books, 2004) ISBN 9780811845694

=== Graphic novels ===
- Dark Satanic Mills with Julian Sedgwick. Illustrated by Marc Olivent and John Higgins (Walker Books, 2013) ISBN 9781406329889
- Scarlett Hart: Monster Hunter (First Second Books, 2018) ISBN 9781250159847
- Voyages in the Underworld of Orpheus Black with Julian Sedgwick. (Walker Books, 2019) ISBN 9780385328029

=== Adult novels ===
- A Love Like Blood (Pegasus Books, 2015) ISBN 9781605986838
- Mister Memory (Mulholland Books, 2016) ISBN 9781444751987
- The Monsters We Deserve (Zephyr, 2018) ISBN 9781788542302

=== Nonfiction ===
- Cowards: The True Story of the Men Who Refused to Fight, London (Hodder Children's Books, 2003) ISBN 9780340860618
- Snow. Illustrated by Marcus Sedgwick (Little Toller Books, 2016) ISBN 9781908213402
- Be the Change – Be Calm: Rise Up and Don’t Let Anxiety Hold You Back (Summersdale, 2022) ISBN 9781800074125
- All In Your Head: What Happens When Your Doctor Doesn’t Believe You? (Bennion Kearny Limited, 2022) ISBN 9781910515983

=== Short stories and novellas ===
- "bad language" in Thirteen (Orchard Books, 2005) ISBN 9781843628354
- "The Heart of Another" in The Restless Dead: Ten Original Stories of the Supernatural. Deborah Noyes, editor. (Candlewick Press, 2007) ISBN 9780763629069
- "The Spear of Destiny" in Doctor Who: Eleven Doctors, Eleven Stories. (Puffin, 2013) ISBN 9780141348940
- "Don't Call It Glory" in The Great War: Stories Inspired by Items from the First World War (Candlewick Press, 2015) ISBN 9780763675547
- "If Only in My Dreams" in I'll Be Home for Christmas (Stripes Publishing, 2016) ISBN 9781847157720
- "Together We Win". 10 Stories to Make a Difference. Daniel Ido, illustrator. (PopUp Projects, 2021) ISBN 9781838323578

=== As illustrator ===
- Outremer: Jaufré Rudel and the Countess of Tripoli – A Legend of the Crusades. Nick Riddle, editor. (Fisher King, 1993) ISBN 9780952432708
- Counsel, June. Once upon Our Time (Glyndley Books, 2000) ISBN 9780953423224
