= The Foreshadowing (novel) =

2005 book by Marcus Sedgwick

- First edition
- Author: Marcus Sedgwick
- Language: English
- Genre: Young Adult Fiction
- Publisher: Wendy Lamb Books
- Publication date: 2005
- Publication place: United Kingdom
- Media type: Print (Hardcover and Paperback)
- Pages: 304 pp
- ISBN: 978-0385746465

The Foreshadowing is a historical fiction novel by Marcus Sedgwick published in 2005. It takes place during the beginning of World War I, following a 17-year-old British girl named Sasha who has premonitions of death.

== Plot summary ==
It is 1915 and World War I has just begun. Seventeen-year-old Alexandra "Sasha" Fox is the privileged daughter of a respected doctor living in the wealthy seaside town of Brighton, England. She longs to be a nurse, but struggles with the societal expectation that women of her class do not do that type of work.

While Sasha's brother Edgar is keen to fight for his country and enlists right away, her brother Tom is much more reluctant and chooses to go to Manchester to study medicine, with their father hoping he will eventually join the Medical Corps.

However, when Edgar is killed in battle, Tom changes his mind and joins the British Army as an officer. Sasha, meanwhile, is reluctantly allowed by her father to start work as a VAD nurse at the hospital where he works, as it begins to overflow with young soldiers. However, working in the hospital soon confirms what Sasha has suspected since a strange incident when she was a young child-- she can sense when someone is going to die.

As her premonitions begin to grow in strength, Sasha sees through them the brutal horrors on the battlefields of the Somme, and the faces of the soldiers who will be killed. One day, a familiar face shines through-- her brother, Tom.

Posing as a military nurse, Sasha goes behind the front lines searching for Thomas, risking her own life as she races to find him, and somehow prevent his death.
