= Theresa Breslin =

Scottish author

Theresa Breslin OBE
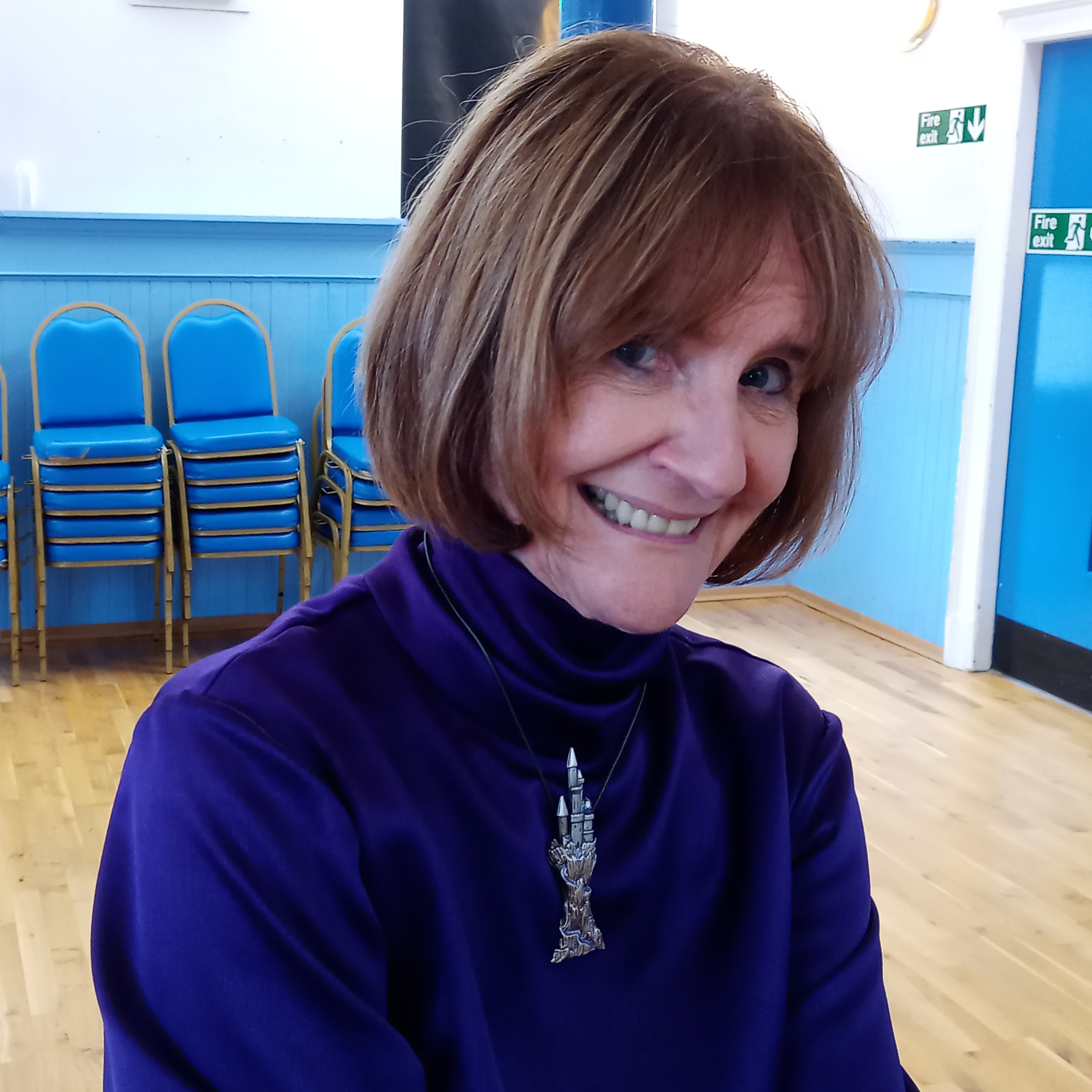
- Breslin in 2023
- Born: Theresa Green; Kirkintilloch, Scotland
- Occupation: Writer

Theresa Breslin OBE is a Scottish author of over 50 books. In 1994, she won the 1994 Carnegie Medal. She is an Honorary Fellow of the Association for Scottish Literary Studies.

In 2019 Breslin received an O.B.E. in the Queen's Birthday Honours List for services to Literature.

== Career ==
Breslin grew up in Kirkintilloch in Scotland. She started writing as a teenager; writing about the closing of a nearby steel mill. She attended Aston University in Birmingham. She began writing for publication whilst employed as a librarian, and she has published over 50 books.

Whispers in the Graveyard, published in 1994, features a dyslexic boy. Breslin won the annual Carnegie Medal from the Library Association, recognising it as that year's best children's book.

Her book Prisoners of the Inquisition was shortlisted for another Carnegie Medal in 2010.

Breslin was appointed Officer of the Order of the British Empire (OBE) in the 2019 Birthday Honours for services to literature. She was awarded the Scottish Book Trust's Outstanding Achievement Award that year.

== Personal life ==
Breslin is married with four children.

== Books ==
Divided City (2005) is her eighth book for the Doubleday list. The Medici Seal, (August 2006) for which her research was extensive, with trips to study Leonardo da Vinci’s most famous works, including the Mona Lisa and The Last Supper. The Medici Seal is a tale of intrigue, murder and betrayal which follows the journey of Matteo as he travels with Leonardo across Italy on the Borgias' business.

== Works ==
- Simon's Challenge (1988)
- Different Directions (1989)
- Time to Reap (1991)
- Kezzie (1993)
- Bullies at School (1993)
- Whispers in the Graveyard (1994)
- Alien Force (1995)
- A Homecoming for Kezzie (1995)
- Missing (1995)
- Death or Glory Boys (1996)
- Name Games (1997)
- Across the Roman Wall (1997)
- Blair, the Winner! (1997) – four stories
- Name Games (1997)
- Bodyparts (1998)
- Starship Rescue (1999)
- Blair Makes a Splash (1999) – four stories
- The Dream Master (1999)
- Dream Master – Nightmare! (2000)
- Duncan of Carrick (2000)
- Remembrance (2002)
- New School Blues (2002)
- Dream Master – Gladiator (2003)
- Prisoner in Alcatraz (2004)
- Dream Master – Arabian Nights (2004)
- Saskia's Journey (2004)
- Divided City (2005)
- The Medici Seal (2006)
- The Nostradamus Prophecy (2008)
- Prisoner of the Inquisition (2010)
- Spy for the Queen of Scots (2012)

- Ghost Soldier (2014)

== Awards and honours ==
- Winner of the Carnegie Medal for Children's Literature - for Whispers in the Graveyard
- Awarded Honorary Membership of the Scottish Library Association for distinguished services to Children's Literature and Librarianship, 2000
- Selected for the American Library Association's Best Books for Young Adults, and New York Public Library's Books for the Teen Age 2003.
- Civic Award from Strathkelvin
- Winner of the Scottish Book Trust Best of the Decade Award
- Winner of Young Book Trust's Kathleen Fidler Award for Simon's Challenge
- Winner of the Sheffield Children's Book Award - longer novel
- Awarded Honorary Fellowship of the Association for Scottish Literary Studies, 2010
- OBE for Services to Literature, 2019

Runners up, etc.

- The Children's Book Award (twice)
- The Angus Book Award
- The Lancashire Book Award
- The Moray Book Award
- North-East Book Award
- The Sheffield Book Award (twice)
- South Lanark Book Award
- The Stockton Book Award
