= Joanna Nadin =

British author

Dr Joanna Nadin is a British author of children's and adult literary fiction best known for the Carnegie Medal-nominated Joe All Alone (now a BAFTA-winning BBC drama) and the Rachel Riley series of novels Based on Nadin's own childhood, the series follows the comedic narration of a 13-year-old girl growing up in Saffron Walden, Essex.

She is a winner of the Lancashire Fantastic Book award, Blue Peter 'Book of the Month' and BBC Radio 4 Open Book 'Book of the Year', has twice been shortlisted for the Queen of Teen award, and Spies, Dad, Big Lauren and Me was selected for the Richard and Judy Book Club. In 2011, Penny Dreadful is a Magnet for Disaster was shortlisted for the Roald Dahl Funny prize.

Nadin previously worked as a policy writer for the Labour Party. In 2001, she became a special adviser to Tony Blair. She continues to freelance as a speechwriter and editor and has lectured in creative writing at Bath Spa University and Bristol University.

In 2016 a primary-aged reader wrote to Nadin, pointing out a grammatical mistake in her book "The Stepmonster". Nadin's humorous letter in reply went viral.

== Bibliography ==
=== Adult fiction ===
- The Talk of Pram Town, London: Macmillan, (2021)
- The Queen of Bloody Everything, London: Macmillan, (2018)

=== Young adult fiction ===
- Everybody Hurts, London: Atom, (2018)
- Paradise, London: Walker, (2011)
- Wonderland, London: Walker, (2009)
- Eden, London: Walker, (2013)

=== 9-12 (MG) fiction ===
- No Man's Land, Lancaster: UCLan, (2021)
- Where Do You Go, Birdy Jones, London: Hachette, (2018)
- The Incredible Billy Wild, London: Hachette, (2017)
- White Lies, Black Dare, London: Hachette, (2015)
- Joe All Alone, London: Hachette, (2013)
- Buttercup Mash, Oxford: Oxford University Press, (2011)
- Spies, Dad, Big Lauren and Me, London: Piccadilly Press, (2011)
- The Money, Stan, Big Lauren and Me, London: Piccadilly Press, (2013)

=== Rachel Riley series ===
- My So-called Life: the Tragically Normal Diary of Rachel Riley, Oxford: Oxford University Press, (2007), ISBN 978-0-19-275526-1
- The Life of Riley: My Utterly Hopeless Search for the One, Oxford: Oxford University Press, (2008), ISBN 978-0-19-275527-8
- The Meaning of Life, Oxford: Oxford University Press, (2008), ISBN 978-0-19-272833-3
- My Double Life, Oxford: Oxford University Press, (2009), ISBN 978-0-19-272921-7
- My (not so) Simple Life, Oxford University Press, (2009), ISBN 978-0-19-272834-0
- Back to Life: Rachel Riley (sort of) seizes the day, Oxford University Press, (2009), ISBN 978-0-19-272922-4
- The Facts of Life: Rachel Riley (almost) wakes up and smells the coffee, Oxford: Oxford University Press, (2010), ISBN 978-0-19-272923-1
- The Time of My Life: The Last Hurrah, Oxford: Oxford University Press, (2013), ISBN 978-0-19-279278-5

=== Illustrated children's stories (5-9) ===
- The Worst Class series, illustrated by Rikin Parekh, London: Bloomsbury Publishing (2020-current)
- The Penny Dreadful series, illustrated by Jess Mikhail, London: Usborne (2011-2017)
- The Flying Fergus series, with Sir Chris Hoy, illustrated by Clare Elsom, London: Piccadilly (2015-2019)
- Maisie Morris and the Awful Arkwrights, illustrated by Arthur Robins, London: Walker, (2003), ISBN 0-7445-9091-4
- Solomon Smee Versus The Monkeys , illustrated by Arthur Robins, London: Walker, (2004)
- Maisie Morris and the Whopping Lies, illustrated by Arthur Robins, London: Walker, (2005) ISBN 978-1-84428-950-9
- Jake Jellicoe and the Dread Pirate Redbeard, illustrated by David Roberts, London: Walker, (2006) ISBN 0-7445-5786-0
- Candy Plastic, illustrated by Sue Mason, London: Walker, (2007), ISBN 978-1-4063-0422-0
