= Exposure (Peet novel) =

2008 young adult novel by Mal Peet

- Front cover of first edition
- Author: Mal Peet
- Cover artist: Francesca Cambi
- Language: English
- Genre: Young adult sports novel
- Publisher: Walker Books
- Publication date: 6 October 2008
- Publication place: United Kingdom
- Media type: Print (hardcover & paperback)
- Pages: 439 pp (first edition)
- ISBN: 978-1-4063-0649-1
- OCLC: 234302060
- LC Class: PZ7.P3564 Exp 2009

Exposure is a sports novel for young adults by English writer Mal Peet, published by Walker Books in 2008. Inspired by William Shakespeare's Othello, the story follows Otello, a black association football player and his high-profile relationship with Desmerelda, a white celebrity. It also has a parallel plot about three street kids trying to live life in abject poverty.

Peet and Exposure won the annual Guardian Children's Fiction Prize, a once-in-a-lifetime book award judged by a panel of British children's writers.

Walker's North American division Candlewick Press published the first U.S. edition in 2009.

== Plot summary ==
Set in South America, Bush, a car-cleaning boy, greets Paul Faustino when he sees him. When he goes to his shed in the slums, Felicia tells him that his sister, Bianca, is missing. He soon finds her watching the night entertainment at an alley. Meanwhile, Otello becomes contracted to the Rialto football team. He is taken to a party at Brabanta's house and he meets Desmerelda there. After the party, Desmerelda asks him to marry her. Despite Brabanta's disapproval of their relationship, Otello and Desmeralda live a life under the scrutiny of the media. In an attempt to stop "wolf men" from looking at Bianca, Bush makes her wear an oversized sweatshirt. After a failed hold up targeted at Desmerelda, Brabanta pulls some strings to prevent him and his daughter's name from newspaper articles mentioning the hold up. Otello assigns Michael to look after Desmerelda. However, when Michael is involved in a nightclub brawl, Desmerelda gets Otello to take Michael back. Meanwhile, Felicia and Bush discuss how to look after Bianca. Felicia forces her breasts against him and goes away just immediately, leaving Bush in a state of emotional confusion. At the same time, Desmerelda discovers that she is pregnant. In response to other racist and defaming sport articles about Otello's first season in Rialto, Paul lists Otello's achievements in the first season of his Rialto career. To promote Otello's product range, the "Paff!" label was developed. Targeted at teenagers, the main theme of the label was rebellion so they used slum kids. Bianca was the most photogenic child at the photoshoot, with all the advertisements of the "Paff!" label featuring her. With Bianca missing for three days, Bush and Felicia go to Paul for help. They find her dead with new clothes on her body and 100 dollars in her bra. Bush and Felicia are overwhelmed by her death. Meanwhile, Otello is accused of looking at child pornography. In the aftermath, Desmeralda leaves Otello and employs Felicia to look after her son and Bush to learn from her gardener.

== Characters ==
Most of the characters have a similar version of themselves in Shakespeare's play, Othello.

Otello

He is a black football star who is married to Desmerelda. He is often the victim of racist comments when he is on the field. He completely trusts Desmerelda and Michael.

Desmerelda

She is a famed pop singer who is married to Otello. Later, she gives birth to her son, Raúl. At the end of the novel, she gives Felicia and Bush a place to sleep in return for Felicia looking after her son and Bush washing the cars and learning from her gardener.

Diego Mendosa

He is Otello's agent and attempts to ruin Otello's life throughout the novel.

Nestor "Senator" Brabanta

He is one of the board of directors for the Rialto football team. However, he has enough influence to make decisions at board meetings without needing to be there. Being Desmerelda's father, he disapproves of her relationship with Otello.

Emilia

She is Diego's pet chameleon.

Michael Cass

He is Otello's bodyguard and driver. He was a former alcoholic. In the first half of the book, he is tasked with protecting Desmerelda. He was fired from his job after he was involved in a brawl at a nightclub.

Bush

He is an orphaned street kid who tries to make an earning washing the cars to feed his sister and his friend.

Bianca

She is Bush's sister and an orphaned street kid. She has a tendency to steal but will never admit that she did. She owns only one shirt. She likes to wear clothes in a provocative way due to her beauty. She is murdered after a photo shoot to promote the "Paff" clothing label.

Felicia

She is Bush's friend and an orphaned street kid. She tries to keep Bianca inside the shed whenever possible. She has romantic feelings for Bush. She owns two shirts. She washes one and tries on the roof of the shed, the other she wears. Although both shirts have gotten smaller, she occasionally alternates between them. Unlike Bianca, she tries to cover her breasts from boys.

Paul Faustino

He is a journalist who writes articles for La Nación which commends Otello's football games. He also becomes friendly with Bush, who works on the street below his office.

Jaco Roderigo

Football player for Rialto

== Production ==
Peet was inspired to write a story based on Shakespeare's Othello because he "had noticed that the names of some of Shakespeare’s characters sounded like football players". Peet thought of Paul Faustino's name from "the name on a bottle of Spanish wine", which meant "little Faust" or, sort of "minor league Faust".

"A few years ago Beckham got into a bit of hot water. He’d been scoring from outside the penalty area, so to speak, and there was a huge media attack on them as a family. I happen to like Beckham. I was really taken aback by the frenzy of this media invasion, not just of him, but of his wife and his kids: the exposures in the paper and the paparazzi in the lavatory, and the kids smuggled in darkened cars, and all that kind of stuff". - Mal Peet

== Reception ==
Josh Lacey from The Guardian compares Exposure to Shakespeare's play Othello with "the novel is divided into five acts. Peet prefaces the action with a cast list. He often uses dialogue and "stage directions" rather than ordinary prose. Even the minor characters draw their names from the original". Amanda Craig from The Times comments that "the ending is not quite like that of the play, and some will find it weaker in its avoidance of total tragedy. The loss of a sporting career can't be as harrowing as the noble Othello's destruction". Caroline Sams from TeenToday comments that the novel "reveals the cold, harsh reality of fame, the sensationalist hype of the media and the inevitable jealousy that comes from lambasting such perfection".
