= Boy Kills Man =

2004 novel by Matt Whyman

- First edition
- Author: Matt Whyman
- Language: English
- Genre: Young adult
- Publisher: Hodder Children's Books
- Publication date: March 2004
- Publication place: United Kingdom
- Media type: Print (Hardback & Paperback)
- Pages: 160 pages
- ISBN: 978-0-340-88195-8

Boy Kills Man is a 2004 novel by British novelist Matt Whyman about child assassins in Medellin, Colombia.

== Characters ==
- Shorty is the main character of this book. When his friend Alberto gets mixed up with guns and gangs, he soon follows.
- Alberto is Shorty's best friend. He becomes involved with a gang which leads to him becoming an assassin and his eventual disappearance.

== Awards ==
- Booktrust Teenage Prize (2004)
- Stockport Schools' Book Award (2005)
- De Jong Jury (Netherlands) (2006)
- Wirral Paperback of the Year (2006)
