= Fiona Walker (author) =

Fiona Walker (born Isle of Wight 1969) is a British author of contemporary women's fiction.

== Biography ==
Fiona Walker studied drama at the University of London before embarking upon a brief career in advertising. Her first novel, French Relations, was published when she was in her early twenties. She lives with her partner and their two daughters in rural Warwickshire.

== Bibliography ==
- French Relations (1994)
- Kiss Chase (1995)
- Well Groomed (1996)
- Snap Happy (1998)
- Lucy Talk (1999)
- Between Males (2001)
- Lots of Love (2003)
- Tongue in Cheek (2005)
- Four Play (2007)
- Love Hunt (2009)
- Kiss and Tell (2011)
- The Love Letter (2012)
- The Summer Wedding (2013)
- The Country Escape (2014)
- The Woman Who Fell in Love for a Week (2015)
- The Weekends of You and Me (2016)
- The Country Set (2017)
- Country Lovers (2019)
- Woman of a Certain Rage Written as Georgie Hall (2021)
- Country Secrets (2023)
- Country Christmas (2023)
- The Village Detectives and The Art of Murder (2024)
- The Village Detectives and The Poison Pen Letter (2024)
- The Village Detectives and The Little Black Book (2025)
- The Village Detectives and The Deadly Brew (2026)
