= Floodland (novel) =

Children's fantasy novel by Marcus Sedgwick

- First edition
- Author: Marcus Sedgwick
- Language: English
- Genre: Children's Fantasy novel
- Publisher: Dolphin Paperback
- Publication date: 2 Mar 2000
- Publication place: United Kingdom
- Media type: Print (Hardback & Paperback)
- Pages: 128 pp (first edition, paperback)
- ISBN: 1-85881-763-3
- OCLC: 41960153

Floodland is a children's fantasy novel by Marcus Sedgwick, published on 2 March 2000 by Orion Children's Books. Floodland won the Branford Boase Award in 2001 for an outstanding first published novel.

== Plot ==
Floodland is set in the near future where most of the United Kingdom is covered by water. A girl named Zoe is left alone by her parents in the ruins of Norwich, which has become an island where food and water are becoming increasingly scarce. She escapes to Eels Island (Ely Cathedral) where she discovers a sinister society run by a strange boy named Dooby. Will she ever find her parents?
