= My Swordhand Is Singing =

2006 novel by Marcus Sedgwick

- First edition cover
- Author: Marcus Sedgwick
- Language: English
- Genre: Children's
- Publisher: Orion
- Publication date: 26 July 2006
- Publication place: United Kingdom
- Pages: 224
- ISBN: 978-1-84255-183-7
- OCLC: 65469729

My Swordhand Is Singing is a novel written by Marcus Sedgwick, set in the early 17th century. It won the 2007 Booktrust Teenage Prize. It was also shortlisted for the CILIP Carnegie Medal in 2007. Inspired by the original vampire folklore of Eastern Europe, the novel follows the story of Peter, the son of drunkard woodcutter Tomas, and his life in the seemingly ordinary village of Chust. He and his father travel from place to place, living a nomadic lifestyle. They have been working in Chust for over a year when things start to happen - unexplainable things, but things Tomas seems to know about.

My Swordhand is Singing is a story of loss and redemption, written in the genre of Gothic fiction. For this story, Sedgwick went to various gloomy locations for the inspiration and research for the book. My Swordhand Is Singing was published by Orion Children's Books and is the seventh Sedgewick novel to be published from here.
