= The Knife That Killed Me =

2008 young adult novel by Anthony McGowan

- First edition
- Author: Anthony McGowan
- Language: English
- Genre: Young adult
- Publisher: Definitions
- Publication date: April 3, 2008
- Publication place: United Kingdom
- Pages: 256 pp
- ISBN: 978-1-86230-606-6
- OCLC: 190777733

The Knife That Killed Me is a 2008 young adult novel by Anthony McGowan. It was shortlisted for the Booktrust Teenage Prize, longlisted for the Guardian Award and longlisted for the Manchester Book Award.

== Plot ==
The Knife that Killed Me is a novel which follows a teenager, Paul Varderman, as he tries to fit in with a group in his school.

At the beginning of the book, Paul is a loner, looking into the groups from the outside. A series of events in which he stands up for members of a group known as "The Freaks" lead to him becoming included by them. "The Freaks" are different from the other groups as they do not live under the rule of the school thug, Roth.

As Paul becomes more involved with "The Freaks", he also begins to become influenced by Roth. Roth uses Paul as a messenger between himself and a rival school and gives him a knife. The relationship between the two schools develops, with Roth leading the way to war between them.
