= Angel Blood (novel) =

2006 book by John Singleton

Angel Blood is a 2006 young adult novel by British author John Singleton published by Puffin Books. It deals with disabilities and outcasts from society.

== Plot ==
There are four children in a sort of asylum called Bin Linnie Lodge (The Bin to the nurses, or Bin Linnie to the locals of the village) with unique disabilities. They are all given the letter G (standing for Gemini) followed by a number 1–4. However they were given unique names by a nurse they loved, Mrs. Murdoe, based on appearance. A boy with two layers of skin rather than the usual seven is named X-Ray, a girl with miniature wings on her back is called Chicken Angel, a boy with weak pulmonaries is called Cough Cough and another girl with no eyes is called Lights Out, or Lolo. As they are kept away from society, they have different names for usual things.

The book opens with one of the children's most hated nurses, Tin Lid, taking away Lolo's "Pippi" (From context, it is a doll but it seems to also mean child). When Lolo resists, Tin Lid calls in the "Hyena Men" (Security) to "Trank" (sedate) her. It is revealed that Tin Lid works for a man called Doctor Dearly, who runs the Bin. The children hate him because Dearly made Mrs Murdoe "go takeaway" (In this instance, it means he sacked her, but in others, it means dying). Mrs Murdoe then became a spirit guide for the children, along with a law-abiding moose's head called Moose (As he doesn't move for them, the children refer to being tired as "moosed" or "moosed out") and a fast cat called Jack. It's also revealed that there were other children once, but eventually, they all "went takeaway" (died) and went to the "Sky Boat" (Heaven). Their death was caused by warts appearing over their bodies ("lumpies"). At one point, a child with two heads is mentioned. All of the children live their lives in near-identical ways, watching a TV movie called the Natural World, (A running plot point is a leopard attacking a group of monkeys), and looking out of a window, (which isn't allowed, so they have to hide it) named The Weather Eye. Meanwhile, in the city outside the Bin, a young man named Nail meets a girl called Natalie while trying to steal from her shop. They strike up a relationship, because of each other's hatred of society. They do jobs to and from the Bin. Cough Cough is getting weaker, and eventually, slowly goes blind. He has warning against Dearly, saying he is trying to kill them all. He reveals that he has given each of them a syringe and is keeping several pills. The others do not believe him until Dearly takes away books and TV, saying it is bad for their eyes. Dearly exposits to X-Ray that he plans to take one of his eyes and transplant it to CC. However, this is postponed due to X-Ray regurgitating on Dearly. When X-Ray tells CC about this, he explains that he has stashed away four syringes and enough pills to kill all of the nurses, he tells them to escape. Eventually, CC "goes takeaway" (dies) during an operation on his eye. X-Ray eventually finds out that CC poisoned himself with some pills and when he explains his theory to Chicken Angel, she tells him that they helped him. Angry, he forgets to hide the Weather Eye, and when Tin Lid sees, she also discovers a diary that CA has been writing in, a coloured pencil to write with, a book and a clock that Lolo calls "Maiden China" (She mishears CC saying what's written on it earlier on, Made in China). As Tin Lid is about to "trank" Lolo (give her an injection), X-Ray stabs Tin Lid with her syringe and runs away with CA and Lolo. Meanwhile, Nail and Natalie visit the Bin, Nat finds the children and stows them away in the back of their van. Nat later tells Nail, and listens to the children's tales of horror inside the Bin. After convincing Nail to take the children to the ocean (where they think they will find the "Sky Boat") they set out, with Nail still worried that they will be arrested for abduction, paedophilia and possibly murder if they do not cure Lolo's case of the "lumpies". On the way, they find Mrs Murdoe's son, a chief ranger, and X-Ray and CA both get the lumpies. The book ends with them reaching the ocean, and holding hands, waiting for death.
