= Come Clean (novel) =

2004 novel by Terri Paddock

- First edition
- Author: Terri Paddock
- Cover artist: Angela Wyant
- Language: English
- Genre: Thriller, fiction
- Publisher: HarperCollins
- Publication date: 2004
- Publication place: United Kingdom
- Media type: Print Paperback
- Pages: 352
- ISBN: 0-00-717247-8 (paperback)

Come Clean is the second novel written by the UK-based American author Terri Paddock. The book was released in the United Kingdom in 2004. The title is the name of a fictional drug rehabilitation center based in the fictional town of Carrefort, Pennsylvania. The book is dedicated to survivors of real life rehabilitation program Straight, Incorporated, including Paddock's sister.

== Plot ==
Justine Ziegler is taken, against her will, to 'Come Clean Drug Rehabilitation Center', the same rehabilitation center her twin brother Joshua Ziegler attended. After an interview with the program director in which most of her answers are twisted out of context to make her seem like a drug addict, Justine is admitted to Come Clean for what is supposedly a three-day observation. First, she is subjected to a strip search by a senior member, before being taken to the main hall, where the members of the program are "motivating" as part of their rehabilitation. The head of the program, Hilary Navarre, asks the group if anyone knows her, and a boy called Earl admits to taking marijuana with her. Justine denies this until pages of her diary are read out and the twisted truth comes out.

Justine's twin, Joshua, was admitted to the program because he was an addict. One night, Justine woke up and saw Joshua sneaking out to go out with his friends. Justine asks to come along and eventually Joshua agrees. When they reach their destination, Joshua and the driver go for a walk. Justine is in the back of a car with Earl, and another boy. They are both smoking marijuana and hand it to Justine, but before she raises it to her lips Joshua reappears and shouts at her to never do it again. After several events like this, the twins' parents admit Joshua to Come Clean.

Throughout the book, there are chapters with memoirs of the twins' childhood. There are such events as just playing, and starting school. Every one of these chapters is written in a style in which Justine is speaking to Joshua. The final memoir chapter documents Joshua's death on New Year's Eve. Joshua's committing suicide is apparent late in the book.

During Justine's imprisonment in Come Clean, she comes to the attention of a senior staff member, Dwight. It is revealed Dwight raped Joshua during his time in Come Clean and drove him to his suicide. Dwight also forces Justine to do a special penance alone so he can also rape Justine, Which due to her being on her period, she is forced to perform fellatio on him.

A new member is admitted to the program, Toby Sheridan, and he and Justine take an instant liking to each other. Toby was about to graduate from high school but was admitted to the program. During a weekly meeting, where the families of the admitted come to discuss their progress, Toby's little sister does not believe he is an addict so enlists his football friends to help him escape. The next meeting, fireworks go off, and everyone is evacuated outside. Members of Toby's football team are causing chaos and assaulting staff members. Toby escapes, and Justine takes refuge in her parents' car, and she is forced to return inside to the program. The senior member who strip-searched Justine when she was admitted, Gwen, found notes that were passed between Justine and Toby which detailed the escape. Justine is in for severe punishment, but as it is late everybody is sent home. Justine is sent home with a senior member called Moira. During the drive home, a van crashes into Moira's car, and several people bang on the windows chanting Justine's name. Justine escapes into the van where Toby is waiting for her.

Toby and Justine catch a bus to Kansas, where Justine's grandmother lives. They live happily until Justine's mother turns up on the door, having separated from Justine's father.

Later that month, Justine is watching television when Dwight sneaks into the house and catches her. He and Hilary have been granted permission from Justine's father to readmit her. When Justine, her grandmother, mother, Hilary, and Dwight are discussing this, Toby returns from a jog. Upon seeing Dwight, he charges him but is knocked out. Hilary took the precaution of contacting the local police before she arrived, and they arrive on the doorstep. In a last-ditch attempt to prevent re-admittance, Justine explains how Dwight raped and emotionally tortured her. Hilary listens to this and in the end, instructs the police officers to arrest Dwight.
