= Sports novel =

Literary genre focusing on sports

A sports novel is a genre of novel that focuses on the theme of sports and athletics in general. The characters, especially the protagonist, are typically athletes, with a setting in the real world (typically in present-day or recent history), and a plot that revolves around sports competitions. The themes typically involve character growth, and overcoming obstacles.

== See also ==
- Sports film
- Sports magazine
- Sports manga
- Sports video game
- Sports journalism
