= Children's Book Award (UK) =

Annual book award

The Children's Book Award is a British literary award for children's books, run by the Federation of Children's Book Groups and previously known as the Red House Children's Book Award. Books published in the U.K. during the preceding calendar year are eligible. It recognises one "Overall" winner and one book in each of three categories: Books for Younger Children, Books for Younger Readers, and Books for Older Readers. (Note: From 1981 to 1991 there was only a single Children's Book Award. From 1992 to 2001 there were three award categories called Picture Book, Short Novel, and Long Novel; the current category names date from 2002. The official website calls for schoolchildren to nominate a "picture book, chapter book, or novel" (RHCBA, Nominate).) The selections are made entirely by children, which is unique among British literary awards.

The Federation of Children's Book Groups owns and coordinates the Award, which it inaugurated in 1981 as the Children's Book Award. Its purpose has been "to celebrate the books that children themselves love reading." From 2001 to 2015 it was sponsored by the mail order bookshop Red House, a brand owned by bookselling company The Book People.

== Process and latest rendition ==
The 2017 Overall Winner was from the Books for Younger Readers category and was won by Michael Morpurgo and illustrator Michael Foreman for An Eagle in the Snow, published by HarperCollins. The 2017 winners were announced at an Award Ceremony held in London on Saturday 10 June 2017.

The 2016 Overall Winner was from the Books for Younger Readers category and was won by Pamela Butchart and illustrator Thomas Flintham with My Head Teacher Is a Vampire Rat, published by Nosy Crow.

The 2015 Overall Winner was from the Books for Younger Children and was announced at the Imagine Festival in February. The Winners were Oliver Jeffeys and Drew Daywalt with The Day the Crayons Quit published by HarperCollins.

The 2014 Overall winner was from the Older Readers category, announced in mid-February 2014: The 5th Wave, written by Rick Yancey and published by Penguin Books.

Winners are determined by the votes of children on three category ballots composed by nominations from the same group. "Children from around the world" are eligible to participate in both stages. At least in Britain, many children participate through book groups.

The three ballots, or shortlists, comprise those ten books that garner the most nominations. There are four books on the Younger Children ballot and three each on the Younger Readers and Older Readers ballots.

== Winners ==
Currently the annual awards cover books first published in the U.K. during the calendar year.

From 1992 to 2017 —the period of one Overall and three category awards— 13 Overall winners have come from the Long Novel or Older Readers category, 9 from the Short Novel or Younger Readers category, 4 from the Picture Book or Younger Children category.

=== 1980s ===
Children's Book Award winners, 1981-1989
Year	Author	Title	Publisher
1981	Quentin Blake	Mister Magnolia	Jonathan Cape
1982	Leon Garfield	Fair's Fair	Macdonald Young Books
1983	Roald Dahl, illus. by Quentin Blake	The BFG	Jonathan Cape
1984	Terry Jones, illus. by Michael Foreman	The Saga of Erik the Viking	Pavilion
1985	Robert Swindells	Brother in the Land	Oxford University Press
1986	Amanda Graham	Arthur	Spindlewood
1987	Janet and Allan Ahlberg	The Jolly Postman	Heinemann
1988	Valerie Thomas, illus. by Korky Paul	Winnie the Witch	Oxford University Press
1989	Roald Dahl, illus. by Quentin Blake	Matilda	Jonathan Cape

=== 1990s ===
Children's Book Award winners, 1990-1999
Year	Category	Author	Title	Publisher
1990	N/A	Robert Swindells	Room 13	Doubleday
1991	N/A	Mick Inkpen	Threadbear	Hodder & Stoughton
1992	Overall	Elizabeth Laird	Kiss the Dust	Methuen
1992	Picture Book	Sally Grindley and Peter Utton	SHHH!	ABC
1992	Short Novel	Dick King-Smith	Find the White Horse	Viking Press
1992	Long Novel	Elizabeth Laird	Kiss the Dust	Methuen
1993	Overall	Jacqueline Wilson	The Suitcase Kid	Heinemann
1993	Picture Book	Berlie Doherty	Snowy	Collins
1993	Short Novel	Jacqueline Wilson	The Suitcase Kid	Heinemann
1993	Long Novel	Robert Westall	Gulf	Methuen
1994	Overall	Ian Strachan	The Boy in the Bubble	Methuen
1994	Picture Book	Lorna and Graham Philpot	Amazing Anthony Ant	Orion
1994	Short Novel	Nigel Hinton	The Finders	Viking Press
1994	Long Novel	Ian Strachan	The Boy in the Bubble	Methuen
1995	Overall	Dick King-Smith	Harriet's Hare	Doubleday
1995	Picture Book	Jeanne Willis, illus. by Korky Paul	The Rascally Cake	Andersen Press
1995	Short Novel	Dick King-Smith	Harriet's Hare	Doubleday
1995	Long Novel	Sharon Creech	Walk Two Moons	Pan Macmillan
1996	Overall	Jacqueline Wilson	Double Act	Doubleday
1996	Picture Book	Paul Geraghty	Solo	Hutchinson
1996	Short Novel	Jacqueline Wilson	Double Act	Doubleday
1996	Long Novel	Michael Morpurgo	The Wreck of the Zanzibar	Heinemann
1997	Overall	Jeremy Strong	The Hundred-Mile-an-Hour Dog	Viking Press
1997	Picture Book	Debi Gliori	Mr Bear to the Rescue	The O'Brien Press
1997	Short Novel	Jeremy Strong	The Hundred-Mile-an-Hour Dog	Viking Press
1997	Long Novel	Ian Strachan	Which Way Is Home?	Methuen
1998	Overall	J. K. Rowling	Harry Potter and the Philosopher's Stone	Bloomsbury
1998	Picture Book	Giles Andreae	The Lion Who Wanted to Love	Orchard Books
1998	Short Novel	Robert Swindells	Nightmare Stairs	Doubleday
1998	Long Novel	J. K. Rowling	Harry Potter and the Philosopher's Stone	Bloomsbury
1999	Overall	J. K. Rowling	Harry Potter and the Chamber of Secrets	Bloomsbury
1999	Picture Book	Kate Lum, illus. by Adrian Johnson	What!	Bloomsbury
1999	Short Novel	Pat Moon, illus. by Nick Sharratt	Little Dad	Mammoth
1999	Long Novel	J. K. Rowling	Harry Potter and the Chamber of Secrets	Bloomsbury

=== 2000s ===
Children's Book Award, 2000, Red House Children's Book Award 2001-2009
Year	Category	Author	Title	Publisher	Ref.
2000	Overall	Michael Morpurgo, illus. by Michael Foreman	Kensuke's Kingdom	Heinemann	
2000	Picture Book	Nicholas Allan	Demon Teddy	Hutchinson	
2000	Short Novel	Michael Morpurgo, illus. by Michael Foreman	Kensuke's Kingdom	Heinemann	
2000	Long Novel	J. K. Rowling	Harry Potter and the Prisoner of Azkaban	Bloomsbury	
2001	Overall	Kes Gray, illus. by Nick Sharratt	Eat Your Peas	The Bodley Head	
2001	Picture Book	Kes Gray, illus. by Nick Sharratt	Eat Your Peas	The Bodley Head	
2001	Short Novel	Jacqueline Wilson, illus. by Nick Sharratt	Lizzie Zipmouth	Corgi	
2001	Long Novel	J. K. Rowling	Harry Potter and the Goblet of Fire	Bloomsbury	
2002	Overall	Malorie Blackman	Noughts and Crosses	Corgi	
2002	Younger Children	Allan Ahlberg, illus. by Katharine McEwen	The Man Who Wore All His Clothes	Walker Books	
2002	Younger Readers	Michael Morpurgo	Out of the Ashes	Macmillan	
2002	Older Readers	Malorie Blackman	Noughts and Crosses	Corgi	
2003	Overall	Anthony Horowitz	Skeleton Key	Walker Books	
2003	Younger Children	Giles Andreae, illus. by Nick Sharratt	Pants	David Fickling	
2003	Younger Readers	Robert Swindells	Blitzed	Doubleday	
2003	Older Readers	Anthony Horowitz	Skeleton Key	Walker Books	
2004	Overall	Michael Morpurgo	Private Peaceful	HarperCollins	
2004	Younger Children	Kes Gray, illus. by Garry Parsons	Billy's Bucket	The Bodley Head	
2004	Younger Readers	Gwyneth Rees	The Mum Hunt	Macmillan	
2004	Older Readers	Michael Morpurgo	Private Peaceful	HarperCollins	
2005	Overall	Simon James	Baby Brains	Walker Books	
2005	Younger Children	Simon James	Baby Brains	Walker Books	
2005	Younger Readers	Jacqueline Wilson	Best Friends	Doubleday	
2005	Older Readers	Robert Muchamore	CHERUB: The Recruit	Hodder	
2006	Overall	Rick Riordan	The Lightning Thief	Disney Hyperion	
2006	Younger Children	Jonathan Emmett and Steve Cox	Pigs Might Fly!	Puffin	
2006	Younger Readers	Andrew Cope	Spy Dog	Puffin	
2006	Older Readers	Rick Riordan	The Lightning Thief	Disney Hyperion	
2007	Overall	Andy Stanton	You're a Bad Man, Mr Gum!	Egmont	
2007	Younger Children	Jeanne Willis, illus. by Adrian Reynolds	Who's in the Loo?	Andersen Press	
2007	Younger Readers	Andy Stanton	You're a Bad Man, Mr Gum!	Egmont	
2007	Older Readers	Sophie McKenzie	Girl, Missing	Simon & Schuster	
2008	Overall	Derek Landy	Skulduggery Pleasant	HarperCollins	
2008	Younger Children	Polly Dunbar	Penguin	Walker Books	
2008	Younger Readers	Chris Riddell	Ottoline and the Yellow Cat	Macmillan	
2008	Older Readers	Derek Landy	Skulduggery Pleasant	HarperCollins	
2009	Overall	Sophie McKenzie	Blood Ties	Simon & Schuster	
2009	Younger Children	Allan Ahlberg, illus. by Bruce Ingman	The Pencil	Walker Books	
2009	Younger Readers	Kes Gray, illus. by Nick Sharratt and Garry Parsons	Daisy and the Trouble with Zoos	Transworld	
2009	Older Readers	Sophie McKenzie	Blood Ties	Simon & Schuster	

=== 2010s ===
Red House Children's Book Award, 2010-2015, Children's Book Award 2016-2019
Year	Category	Author	Title	Publisher	Ref.
2010	Overall	Suzanne Collins	The Hunger Games	Scholastic	
2010	Younger Children	Jeanne Willis, illus. by Adam Stower	Bottoms Up!	Puffin	
2010	Younger Readers	Tanya Landman	Mondays Are Murder	Walker Books	
2010	Older Readers	Suzanne Collins	The Hunger Games	Scholastic	
2011	Overall	Michael Morpurgo	Shadow	HarperCollins	
2011	Younger Children	Angela McAllister, illus. by Alison Edgson	Yuck! That's Not a Monster!	Little Tiger Press	
2011	Younger Readers	Michael Morpurgo	Shadow	HarperCollins	
2011	Older Readers	Alex Scarrow	Time Riders	Penguin	
2012	Overall	Patrick Ness and Jim Kay	A Monster Calls	Walker Books	
2012	Younger Children	Chris Wormell	Scruffy Bear and the Six White Mice	Jonathan Cape	
2012	Younger Readers	Liz Pichon	The Brilliant World of Tom Gates	Scholastic	
2012	Older Readers	Patrick Ness and Jim Kay	A Monster Calls	Walker Books	
2013	Overall	Andrew Weale, illus. by Lee Wildish	The Spooky Spooky House	Corgi	
2013	Younger Children	Andrew Weale, illus. by Lee Wildish	The Spooky Spooky House	Corgi	
2013	Younger Readers	David Walliams, illus. by Tony Ross	Gangsta Granny	HarperCollins	
2013	Older Readers	Sophie McKenzie	The Medusa Project: Hit Squad	Simon & Schuster	
2014	Overall	Rick Yancey	The 5th Wave	Penguin	
2014	Younger Children	Julia Donaldson, illus. by Axel Scheffler	Superworm	Scholastic	
2014	Younger Readers	Jennifer Gray	Atticus Claw Breaks the Law	Faber	
2014	Older Readers	Rick Yancey	The 5th Wave	Penguin	
2015	Overall	Drew Daywalt, illus. by Oliver Jeffers	The Day the Crayons Quit	HarperCollins	
2015	Younger Children	Drew Daywalt, illus. by Oliver Jeffers	The Day the Crayons Quit	HarperCollins	
2015	Younger Readers	David Walliams	Demon Dentist	HarperCollins	
2015	Older Readers	Sophie McKenzie	Split Second	Simon and Schuster	
2016	Overall	Pamela Butchart, illus. by Thomas Flintham	My Head Teacher Is a Vampire Rat	Nosy Crow	
2016	Younger Children	Viviane Schwarz	Is There a Dog in This Book?	Walker Books	
2016	Younger Readers	Pamela Butchart, illus. by Thomas Flintham	My Head Teacher Is a Vampire Rat	Nosy Crow	
2016	Older Readers	Sarah Crossan	Apple and Rain	Bloomsbury	
2017	Overall	Michael Morpurgo, illus. by Michael Foreman	An Eagle in the Snow	HarperCollins	
2017	Younger Children	Kes and Claire Gray, illus. by Jim Field	Oi Dog!	Hachette	
2017	Younger Readers	Michael Morpurgo, illus. by Michael Foreman	An Eagle in the Snow	HarperCollins	
2017	Older Readers	Sarah Crossan	One	Bloomsbury	
2019	Overall	Arree Chung	Mixed	Macmillan	
2019	Younger Children	Arree Chung	Mixed	Macmillan	
2019	Younger Readers	Eoin Colfer, illus. by P. J. Lynch	The Dog Who Lost His Bark	Walker Books	
2019	Older Readers	Tom Palmer	Armistice Runner	Barrington Stoke	

2020s
Year	Category	Author	Work	Publisher	Ref
2020	Overall	Tom Palmer	D-Day Dog		
2020	Younger Children	Kjartan Poskitt	The Runaway Pea		
2020	Younger Readers	Zanna Davidson	Mutant Zombies Cursed My School Trip		
2020	Older Readers	Angie Thomas	On the Come Up		
2020	Confident Readers	Tom Palmer	D-Day Dog		
2022	Overall	Peter Bently	Octopus Shocktopus!		
2022	Younger Children	Peter Bently	Octopus Shocktopus!		
2022	Younger Readers	M. G. Leonard	The Highland Falcon Thief		
2022	Older Readers	Liz Kessler	When the World Was Ours		
2023	Overall	Louie Stowell	Loki: A Bad God's Guide to Being Good		
2023	Younger Children	Olaf Falafel	Blobfish		
2023	Younger Readers	Louie Stowell	Loki: A Bad God's Guide to Being Good		
2023	Older Readers	Jennifer Killick	Dread Wood		
2024	Overall	Thomas Flintham	Press Start! Game On, Super Rabbit Boy!	Nosy Crow	
2024	Younger Children	Rob Biddulph	Gigantic	HarperCollins	
2024	Younger Readers	Thomas Flintham	Press Start! Game On, Super Rabbit Boy!	Nosy Crow	
2024	Older Readers	Matt Goodfellow	The Final Year	Otter-Barry Books	
2025	Overall	Ross Montgomery	I am Rebel	Walker Books	
2025	Younger Children	Leonie Lord	Grotti	Walker Books	
2025	Younger Readers	Ross Montgomery	I am Rebel	Walker Books	
2025	Older Readers	Malcolm Duffy	Seven Mission Sunflowers	Zephyr	

== Winners of multiple awards ==
Prior to winning the 2012 Red House Award, Overall, A Monster Calls was named the 2011 British Children's Book of the Year. Subsequently, Ness and Kay as writer and illustrator won both annual children's book awards from the professional librarians, the Carnegie Medal and Greenaway Medal; that double award alone was an unprecedented sweep. In fact, no previous Children's/Red House Award winner (Overall) has won the Carnegie Medal and only one has won the Greenaway Medal for illustration: the inaugural Children's winner Mr Magnolia (Jonathan Cape, 1980), written and illustrated by Quentin Blake.

=== Authors with multiple Children's/Red House Awards ===
Michael Morpurgo has won four Overall awards for Kensuke's Kingdom in 2000, Private Peaceful in 2004, Shadow in 2011 and An Eagle in the Snow in 2017. He has also won category awards for The Wreck of the Zanzibar in 1996 and Out of Ashes in 2002.

Four other authors have won two Overall awards:

- Roald Dahl 1983, 1989
- Robert Swindells 1985, 1990
- Jacqueline Wilson 1993, 1996
- J. K. Rowling 1998, 1999

J. K. Rowling won the Long Novel category four years in succession, 1998 to 2001, for the first four Harry Potter books.
