= Chris Chatterton =

English illustrator and animator

Christopher Chatterton
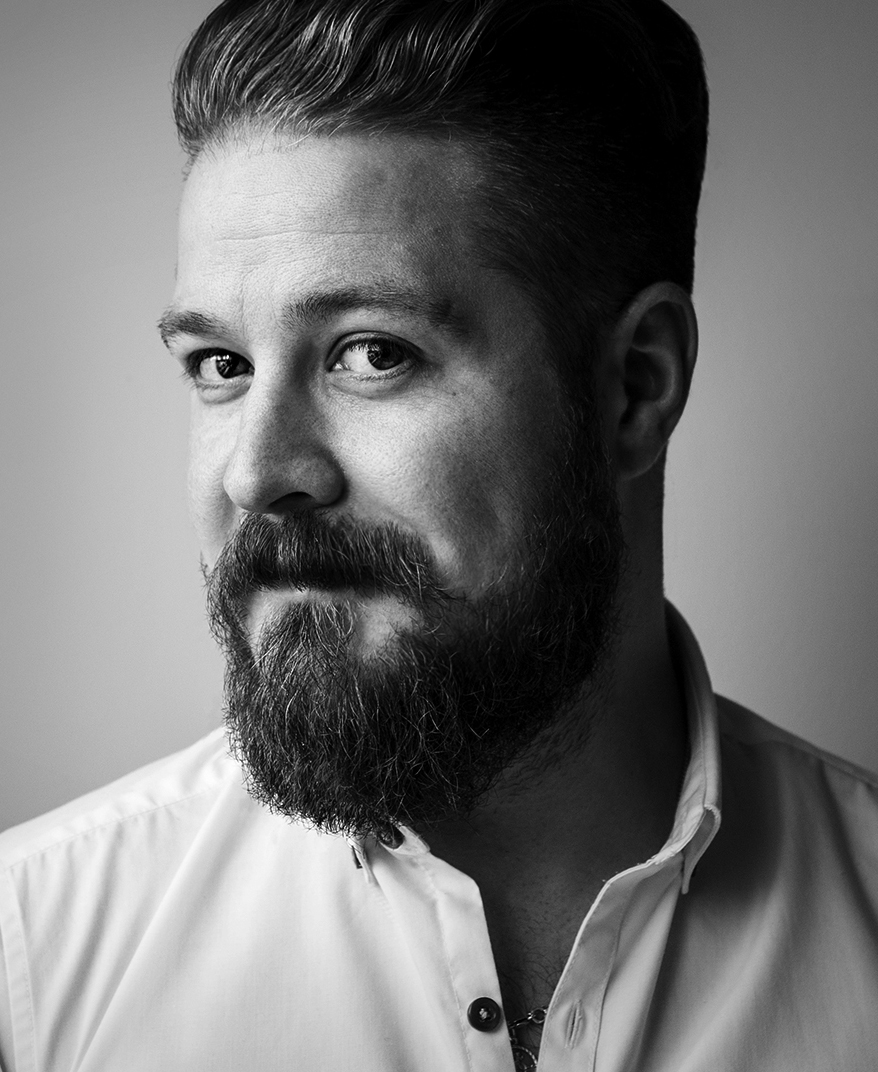
- Chatterton in 2016
- Born: 1982 (age 43–44); County Durham, England
- Website: www.chrischatterton.com

Chris Chatterton is an English illustrator and animator from County Durham. He is the illustrator of children's picturebooks including Supermarket Gremlins, and Pete's Magic Pants. He was the animation director of two animated episodes of the Doctor Who story, The Ice Warriors, released on DVD in August 2013.

== Life and career ==
Chris Chatterton was born in 1982 in County Durham, England. Chatterton worked in graphic design before joining animation studio Qurios Entertainment. Chatterton worked on a wide variety of commercials and animated projects for TV, film and games including Hyperdrive, Bonkers, Spooks, Tracy Beaker Returns and The Dumping Ground. Qurios later merged with Dene Films, a Newcastle upon Tyne based live action production company where Chatterton was Production Manager until 2013.

In February 2013 it was announced that Chatterton would direct two animated episodes of the Doctor Who story, The Ice Warriors with long-time collaborators Niel Bushnell and Chris Chapman as co-producers.

In 2013, with the closure of both Qurios and Dene Films Chatterton began working as an illustrator for children's picturebooks. He is represented by the Bright Literary Agency.

== Illustrated Works ==
=== Pete's Magic Pants ===
- Pete's Magic Pants: The Lost Dinosaur (2016) written by Paddy Kempshall
- Pete's Magic Pants: Pirate Peril (2017) written by Paddy Kempshall

=== Gremlins series ===
- Supermarket Gremlins (2016) written by Adam and Charlotte Guillain
- School Gremlins (2017) written by Adam and Charlotte Guillai
- Christmas Gremlins (2018) written by Adam and Charlotte Guillai

=== Dino Diggers ===
- Dino Diggers: Digger Disaster (2017) written by Rose Impey
- Dino Diggers: Crane Calamity (2018) written by Rose Impey
- Dino Diggers: Dumper Truck Danger (2018) written by Rose Impey

=== Ten Minutes to Bed ===
- Ten Minutes to Bed: Little Unicorn (2018) written by Rhiannon Fielding
- Ten Minutes to Bed: Little Monster (2019) written by Rhiannon Fielding
- Ten Minutes to Bed: Little Mermaid (2019) written by Rhiannon Fielding
- Ten Minutes to Bed: Little Unicorn's Christmas (2019) written by Rhiannon Fielding
- Ten Minutes to Bed: Little Unicorn's Birthday (2020) written by Rhiannon Fielding

=== Arnold and Louise ===
- The Great Louweezie - Arnold and Louise #1 (2019) written by Erica S Perl
- Lost and Found - Arnold and Louise #2 (2019) written by Erica S Perl
- Happy Fell - Arnold and Louise #3 (2019) written by Erica S Perl
- All the Fun Winter Things - Arnold and Louise #4 (2019) written by Erica S Perl

=== A Math Tale ===
- Crash! Boom! a Math Tale (2018) written by Robie H Harris
- Now What? a Math Tale (2019) written by Robie H Harris

=== The Princess Rules ===
- The Princess Rules (2020) written by Philippa Gregory
- It’s a Prince Thing (2021) written by Philippa Gregory

=== Individual books ===
- Kindergarten is Cool (2016) written by Linda Elovitz Marshall
- There's a Bison Bouncing on the Bed! (2016) written by Paul Bright
- When Santa Came to Stay (2016) written by Timothy Knapman
- The Worrysaurus (2019) written by Rachel Bright (author)
- The Hugasaurus (2021) written by Rachel Bright Rachel Bright (author)

== Books as Author and Illustrator ==
- This is Gus (2019)
- Merry Christmas, Gus (2020)
