= Love Monster =

Love Monster may refer to:

- Love Monster (album), an album by Amy Shark
- Love Monster (EP), an EP by Monster Magnet
- Love Monster (manga), by Riko Miyagi
- Love Monster (TV series), a children's television show
- Love Monster, a series of books by Rachel Bright

== See also ==
- Love & Monsters (disambiguation)
