= Kes Gray =

British author

- Born: 1960 (age 65–66); Chelmsford, England
- Known for: Children's Literature
- Notable work: Oi Frog!

Kes Gray (born 1960) is a British author of children's books.

== Life and work ==
Gray attended Great Baddow Comprehensive, then graduated from the University of Kent with an honours degree in English and American literature.

He is one of the UK's bestselling writers for children, with over two million copies of his stories sold. He is known for the award-winning Daisy picture books, illustrated by Nick Sharratt, the chart-topping Oi! series illustrated by Jim Field and a collaboration with the athlete Mo Farah. The Oi! series books were narrated as audiobooks by comedian and actor David Mitchell, who also narrated Gray's books, How Many Legs? and Quick Quack Quentin.

=== Awards ===
Gray was listed as one of the top ten children's authors in the UK in 2003. As well as the awards listed below, he has been shortlisted for the British Book Awards.

- 2020: winner in the Favourite Characters category, Sainsbury's Children's Book Award, for Oi! See It, Say It!. Hachette Children's. 25 June 2020. ISBN 978-1-4449-5685-6.
- 2017: winner in the Best Laugh Out Loud Picture Book category, Laugh Out Loud Book Awards (aka "the Lollies"), for Oi Dog!. Hachette Children's. 28 July 2016. ISBN 978-1-4449-2897-6.
- 2001: winner in the Picture Book category, and overall winner, Red House Children's Book Award, for Eat Your Peas. Dorling Kindersley. 2000. ISBN 978-0-7894-2667-3.

== Stage adaptation ==
In 2019, Hughes and Pins & Needles Productions adapted Gray and Field's children's book series Oi Frog and Friends for the stage. The script was developed and written by Richy Hughes, Emma Earle, Zoe Squire and Luke Bateman, with lyrics by Hughes. The production premiered at Frensham Heights School in October 2019, before going on to a critically acclaimed run at the Lyric Theatre in London's West End. In 2020, the show was nominated for the Laurence Olivier Award for Best Family Show.

== List of works ==
=== Nelly The Monster Sitter series ===
- 1. Grerks (2012)
- 2. Squurms (2012)
- 3. Water Greeps (2012)
- 4. Cowcumbers (2012)
- 5. Pipplewaks (2012)
- 6. The Altigators (2012)
- 7. The Huffaluks (2012)
- 8. The Muggots (2012)
- 9. Thermitts (2012)
- 10. Polabores (2012)
- 11. Digdiggs (2012)
- 12. The Dendrilegs (2012)
- 13. The Ultravores (2012)
- 14. The Rimes (2012)
- 15. The Wattwatts (2012)
- Nelly the Monster-Sitter (2016)
- The Grerks at No. 55 (2018)
- The Squurms at No. 322 (2019)
- The Thermitts at No. 27 (2019)
- The Hott Heds at No. 87 (2019)

=== Daisy series ===
- 006 and a Bit (2006)
- Daisy and the Trouble with Life (2007)
- Daisy and the Trouble with Zoos (2008)
- Daisy and the Trouble with Giants (2008)
- Daisy and the Trouble with Kittens (2009)
- Daisy and the Trouble with Christmas (2009)
- Daisy and the Trouble with Maggots (2010)
- Daisy and the Trouble with Coconuts (2012)
- Daisy and the Trouble with Burglars (2013)
- Daisy and the Trouble with Sports Day (2014)
- Daisy and the Trouble with Piggybanks (2015)
- A Winter Double Daisy (2015)
- Daisy and the Trouble With Jack (2016)
- A Summer Double Daisy (2016)
- Daisy and the Trouble with Halloween (2016)
- Daisy and the Trouble with Chocolate (2017)
- Daisy and the Trouble with School Trips (2018)
- Daisy and the Trouble with Nature (2020)
- Daisy and the Trouble With Unicorns (2021)
- Daisy and the Trouble With London (2022)
- Daisy and the Trouble With Space (2024)
- Daisy and the Trouble With Shopping (2025)

=== Get Well Friends series ===
- Zoe the Zebra (2011)
- Chesney Runs into Trouble! (2012)
- Momo Goes Flying (2012)
- Nurse Nibbles and her Get Well Friends (2013)
- Zoe Gets the Jitters! (2013)
- Pedro Has a Bump! (2014)

=== Jack Beechwhistle series ===
- 1. Attack of the Giant Slugs (2016)
- 2. Rise Of The Hairy Horror (2017)

=== Go Mo series ===
- 1. Monster Mountain Chase! (2017)
- 2. Dinosaur Dash! (2017)
- 3. Seaside Sprint! (2018)

=== Picture books ===
- The Get Well Soon Book (2000)
- Eat Your Peas (2000)
- Who's Poorly Too? (2000)
- Really, Really (2002)
- Toffee and Marmalade (2002)
- Billy's Bucket (2003)
- Our Twitchy (2003)
- Baby On Board (2003)
- Cluck O'clock (2003)
- You Do! (2003)
- If I Was Boss (2004)
- Yuk! (2004)
- Ever So Ever So (2004)
- A Bunch of Daisies (2005)
- Vesuvius Poovius (2006) (with Chris Mould)
- Mummy Goes to Work (2006)
- aka My Mum Goes to Work
- Double Trouble (2006)
- Twoo Twit (2006)
- 006 and a Half: A Daisy Book (2007)
- Tiger Ways (2007)
- First Day (2007)
- Accidentally, On Purpose (2008)
- Super Daisy (2009)
- Mum and Dad Glue (2009)
- Leave Me Alone (2011)
- Nuddy Ned (2013)
- Pepe Takes a Tumble (2013)
- Mice in the Churchyard (2013)
- Peas & Tickles Double Daisy (2013)
- Tigers & Spies Double Daisy (2013)
- Oi Frog (2014) (with Jim Field)
- Worries Go Away! (2014)
- How Many Legs? (2015)
- Zippo the Super Hippo (2015)
- Frog on a Log? (2015)
- Quick Quack Quentin (2016)
- Oi Dog! (2016)
- Ready Steady Mo! (2016) (with Mo Farah)
- Nuddy Ned's Christmas (2016)
- Nuddy Ned's Christmas (2016)
- Oi Dog!: Board Book (2017) (with Claire Gray)
- Dog on a Frog? (2017) (with Claire Gray)
- Oi Cat (2017)
- The Night Before the Night Before Christmas (2018) (with Claire Powell)
- Think Big (2019)
- Oi Puppies! (2019)
- The Diddle That Dummed (2020)
- The Night After Christmas (2020)
- Brrr! (2022)

=== Chapter books ===
- Duperball (2007)
