= Farmageddon =

Farmageddon, a portmanteau of farm and Armageddon, can refer to:

- Farmageddon (book), a 2014 book by Philip Lymbery
- Farmageddon (comic strip), a British comic strip
- Iowa State–Kansas State football rivalry, an ongoing competition between Iowa State University and Kansas State University
- A Shaun the Sheep Movie: Farmageddon, 2019 animated film
