= The Land That Time Forgot =

The Land That Time Forgot may refer to:

- The Land That Time Forgot (novel) (1918), by Edgar Rice Burroughs
- The Land That Time Forgot (1974 film), directed by Kevin Connor, based on the 1918 novel
- The Land That Time Forgot (2009 film), directed by C. Thomas Howell, produced by The Asylum
- The Land That Time Forgot (2025 film), directed by Anthony Frith, produced by The Asylum

== See also ==
- The Land Before Time (disambiguation)
- Land of the Lost (disambiguation)
- The War that Time Forgot
