= Butchart =

Butchart is a surname that refers to:

- Adrian Butchart (contemporary), British screenwriter and producer
- Amber Butchart (contemporary), British fashion historian
- Andrew Butchart (born 1991), British long-distance runner
- Harvey Butchart (1907–2002), American mathematics professor and hiker
- Iain Butchart (born 1960), Zimbabwean cricket player
- Pamela Butchart, Scottish children's author
