= The Boy in the Bubble (novel) =

1993 children's novel by Ian Strachan

The Boy In The Bubble is a children's novel written by Ian Strachan and published in 1993. The novel is about the story of Adam (a child born with severe combined immunodeficiency (SCID), and lived his life in an oxygen tent to prevent him from falling ill), and a schoolgirl named Anne, who chooses to base her school project on Adam. The novel won the Red House Children's Book Award, and was the 1994 Lancashire Book of the Year.

== Plot summary ==
The story follows Anne, a girl who while coming home from school one day meets Adam, who suffers from SCID. Due to his illness, Adam has no functional immune system, and must be shielded from the world in a plastic oxygen tent lest he becomes deathly ill. Anne visits Adam frequently and their relationship develops.

The two become romantically involved, but Adam worries he is cheating Anne out of a more fulfilling relationship, as he cannot leave his oxygen tent. He expresses his concern to Anne, who misunderstands and breaks up with Adam, thinking he has lost interest in her.

Anne starts seeing someone else but realizes she misses Adam and goes to his house to apologize. When Anne arrives, Adam's mother informs her that Adam is undergoing a bone marrow transplant, a procedure that will strengthen his immune system if successful, but if unsuccessful, may be fatal. After the operation, Adam is able to live outside his sterilized bubble and embrace Anne and his family, but two weeks later, the weekend before Christmas, Adam dies.

== Background ==
SCID, abbreviated for severe combined immunodeficiency and dubbed 'bubble boy disease' is a birth defect where the newborn lacks T- and B-lymphocyte systems. This lack of immune cells causes even common infections to be frequent, oftentimes severe and deadly. Weakened strains of bacteria and viruses used in vaccines are also ineffective and dangerous to patients with SCID due to lack of immune cells to combat the pathogens.

The term 'bubble boy disease' is derived from the 1970s and 1980s when the story of David Vetter, a child with SCID, lived within a sterile containment for 12 years.

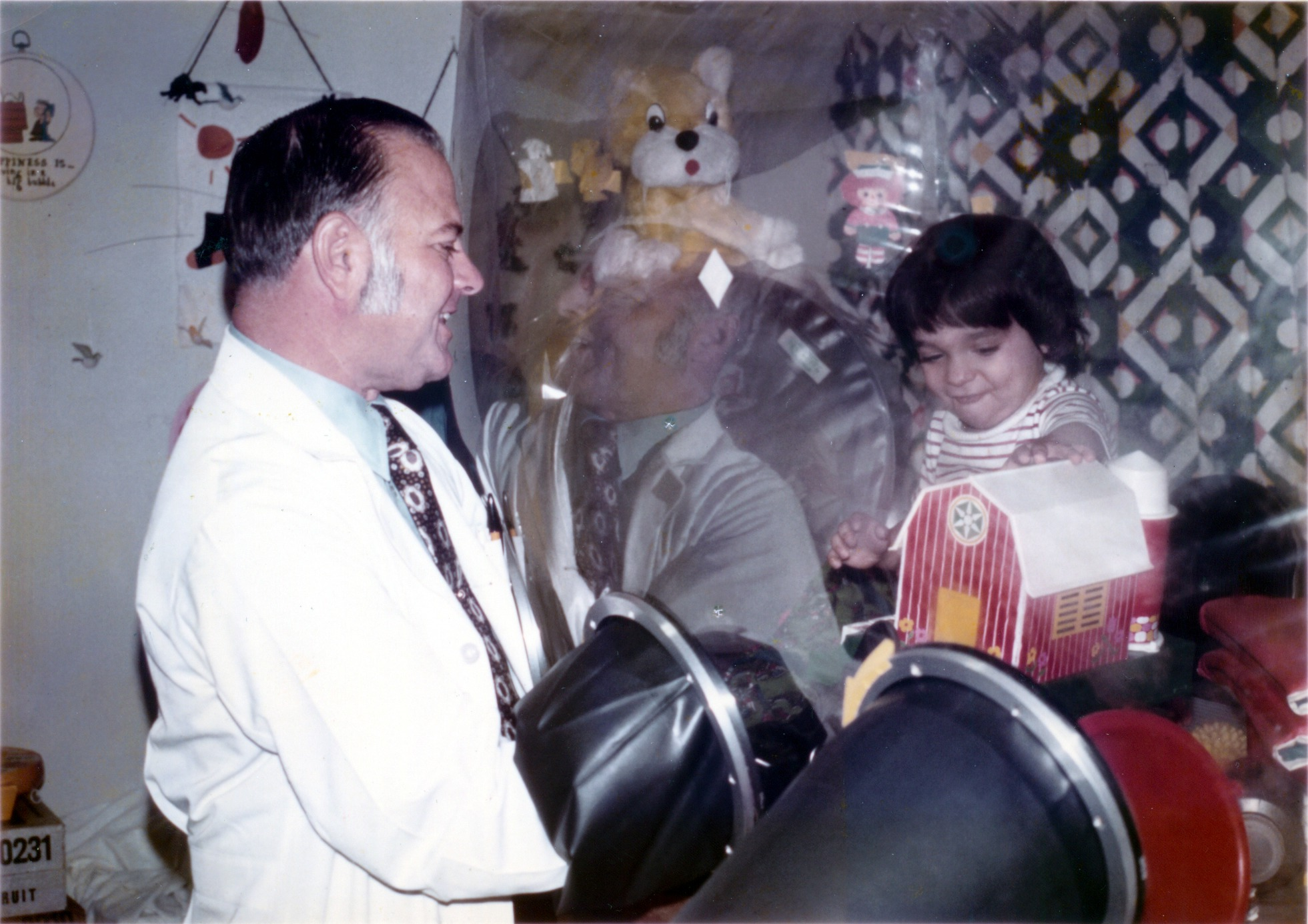
An example of the bubble an SCID patient would live in.

Today, SCID is curable upon early diagnosis. SCID could be cured through a stem cell transplant, otherwise known as a bone marrow transplant. Stem cells from a healthy individual could be used to morph into immune cells the patient lacks, and transfused into the patient's bloodstream so the patient develops an immune system. This treatment is most likely to be effective the earlier the disease is diagnose, thus immediate diagnosis is crucial to curing the child.

== Critical reception and awards ==
The Boy In The Bubble has won multiple awards for its story on the impact of SCID on a young person's life. Among these awards include the Lancashire Book of the Year award in 1994, where young judges elect the winners of the award run by the Lancashire County Council. The novel has also won the Long Novel and Overall Award in the Red House Children's Book Award in 1994, run by The Federation of Children's Book Groups, which recognizes books that particularly impact children.

== Background on author ==
There is not much clear information on Ian Strachan's background. From what is known, Ian Strachan is a British novelist who writes young adult fiction. Strachan was born in 1939 and is still alive today. Strachan wrote multiple books on children struggling with disease and disability, and became a Nominee for the Angus Book Award, an award given by the Angus Council in Scotland, and won multiple prizes for his books.
