= Room 13 (Swindells novel) =

Book by Robert Swindells

- First edition
- Author: Robert Swindells
- Cover artist: Mark Robertson
- Genre: Gothic Horror
- Publisher: Doubleday
- Publication date: 1989
- Media type: Print (paperback)
- Pages: 347 pp
- ISBN: 0-385-26967-6

Room 13 is a Gothic-horror children's novel written by the acclaimed award-winning children's author Robert Swindells. Published in 1989, it was awarded the Red House Children's Book Award. The novel centres around a group of friends on a school trip, who stay in a creepy hotel on Whitby's West Cliff.

== Plot summary ==
Fliss Morgan has a nightmare on the night before her school trip, to Whitby. Every night Ellie-May Sunderland is drawn to the landing outside the mysterious Room 13, which does not seem to exist during the day. Fliss and her friends attempt to unravel the mystery of the room, and determine the identity of its sinister inhabitant.

== Characters ==
- "Fliss"/Felicity Morgan: The main character who leads in the investigation of ROOM 13. Fliss begins observing strange events in the hotel at night, and becomes determined to get to the bottom of what is going on.
- Lisa Watmough: Fliss' best friend, who joins her in investigating Room 13.
- Ellie-May Sunderland: A rather annoying, selfish girl who is caught in the middle of the hotel's nighttime happenings.
- Gary Bazzard: A boy with a reputation for mischief and misbehaviour, who joins Fliss in investigating Room 13.
- David "Trot" Trotter: Gary's best friend, who joins Fliss in investigating Room 13.
- Mr. Hepworth: A sardonic but caring teacher, who is in charge of the school trip to Whitby.
- Mrs Evans: Another teacher, who coordinates the trip with Mr Hepworth.
- Mrs. Marriott: Another teacher.
- Sally "Sal" Haggerlythe: An elderly woman who sits in the bus shelter near the children's hotel, and is widely believed to be insane.

=== Minor Characters ===
- Barry Tune: A student
- Neil Atkinson: A student
- Richard Varley: A student
