= The Christmas Pig =

2021 fairy tale by J. K. Rowling

- UK first edition cover
- Author: J. K. Rowling
- Illustrator: Jim Field
- Language: English
- Genre: Christmas stories, fairy tales, fantasy, children's book
- Publisher: Hachette Children's Group
- Publication date: 12 October 2021
- Publication place: United Kingdom
- ISBN: 978-1444964912

The Christmas Pig is a Christmas fairy tale novel by J. K. Rowling and illustrated by Jim Field. The story was published in October 2021. Upon release, the book received positive critical reviews and emerged a bestseller with high pre-sales on Amazon.

== Plot ==
On Christmas Eve, Jack's resentful stepsister Holly throws his beloved toy pig DP out of the car window into the road, where it is destroyed by traffic. The family buy a replacement they name Christmas Pig, but Jack tosses it aside. Christmas Pig nobly decides to find DP for Jack and through Christmas magic Jack shrinks and he and Christmas Pig get sent to the Land of the Lost.

The Land of the Lost is an afterlife for all lost things, divided into areas depending on the degree of lostness. Neither Jack nor Christmas Pig belong, so they have to hide from the authorities. Hiding inside a lunchbox with a lost inhaler inside, they arrive at the town of Bother-It's-Gone, but law enforcement agents chase them into the Wastes of the Unlamented.

Jack and Christmas Pig, now called CP by Jack, find their way to the City of Missed where they meet the personifications of lost emotions. A king called Power notices Jack is a real boy and tries to turn him over to the Loser, the land's cruel ruler. Fortunately, Hope manages to help Jack and CP escape and fly them to the Island of the Beloved, where the Loser cannot come nor harm any of the Island's immortal residents. There, Jack meets his beloved DP and the family's lost Christmas tree angel, who are living happily together. After being able to say a proper goodbye to DP, Jack wants to recover CP, who did not land on the Island with him.

Santa Claus flies Jack to the Wastes of the Unlamented where CP and the replacement tree angel are caged in the Loser's Lair. The Loser plans to eat them, which would make their physical bodies back in the Land of the Living disappear. Jack manages to save them from the Loser and they magically return home.

Jack's family are relieved to find him safe and Holly promises not to bully him again, believing his story about the Land of the Lost. Going to bed, Jack wishes CP goodnight and CP wishes him goodnight in return.

== Background ==
Rowling's ideas for The Christmas Pig first originated in 2012. She had always wanted to write a Christmas story, and was inspired by a pair of toy pigs her son had as a young child. She completed writing the book in 2020 during the COVID-19 pandemic. Rowling said that, due to the pandemic, "I was unusually aware of the need for human connection. I think that's why I kept imagining it being read aloud while working on it, something I've never done with any other book." She described the story as "about being lost and being found, about loving and being loved about, what stays with us and what falls away. It's also about hope and endurance."

The Christmas Pig is illustrated by Jim Field.

== Release and reception ==
The Christmas Pig was published by Hachette Children's Group in the UK, Australia, New Zealand, Ireland and India, and by Scholastic in the US and Canada. It was the number one bestseller on its first week on sale in the UK, selling 60,010 copies, the 16th book of Rowling's to reach number one in its first week. The novel also topped The New York Times's children's middle grade hardcover bestseller list.

The Times called the book a "wonderful, timely" story. The New York Times stated, "Rowling has written a marvelously persuasive fantasy for our times, one that looks back to the past in its determination to enlighten and console." The Evening Standard called it "her best since Azkaban".

== Film adaptation ==
In April 2024, Variety reported that an animated film adaptation of The Christmas Pig was in development at Warner Bros. Pictures Animation.
