= Federation of Children's Book Groups =

United Kingdom charity

The Federation of Children's Book Groups (FCBG) is a national charity in the United Kingdom that promotes children's books and reading for pleasure for all ages of children, from newborns to teenagers. The organisation is run by volunteers interested in supporting children and their books, both at a national level, through an executive, and a local level, through local groups, with the support also of individuals and professional members. The Federation liaises with publishers, libraries, schools and other bodies with an interest in literacy, reading and young people.

The Federation owns and coordinates the Children's Book Award, the UK's only national book award voted for entirely by children, formerly known as the Red House Children's Book Award.

The Federation promotes National Share-a-Story Month (every May) and National Non-Fiction Day (every November). It holds an annual conference each spring (with the help of local groups) as well as various one day regional conferences. The Federation regularly publishes booklists for children of different ages, as well as producing newsletters three times a year, and providing general advice and information on children's books and reading for enjoyment.

In 2011, the Federation of Children's Book Groups won the Eleanor Farjeon Award for distinguished service to the world of British children's books.

== History ==
Anne Wood, a British children's television producer, and creator of the Teletubbies, established the first Book Group to promote enthusiasm for and about children's book in 1965. Soon more groups were created and the Federation of Children's Book Groups was created in 1968. Many of the original local groups are still in existence, though new groups are developing every year.

== Local Book Groups ==
There are currently over 25 separate Book Groups throughout England, Scotland and Wales. Each group is different but typically a local group holds

- Meetings for adults to discuss children's books.
- Events with visiting speakers, including authors and illustrators.
- Activities for children such as storytelling and book exhibitions.
