= The Land Before Time (disambiguation) =

The Land Before Time is a media franchise.

The Land Before Time may also refer to:

- The Land Before Time (film), 1988 American-Irish animated adventure drama film
- Two video games called The Land Before Time released for the Game Boy Color in 2001, and the Game Boy Advance in 2002
- The Land Before Time (TV series), an animated TV series that ran from 2007 to 2008

== See also ==
- The Land That Time Forgot (disambiguation)
