= Farmageddon (comic strip) =

Farmageddon started life in 1991 as a comic strip called The Funny Farm and was created by Niel Bushnell and Gordon Fraser. Bushnell and Fraser were friends from school and both wanted careers as comic artists. They began to develop an idea for a newspaper comic strip based around a farm. Initially inspired by American comic strips such as Calvin and Hobbes and Garfield, the comic soon found its own blend of humour.

== The Funny Farm ==
The Funny Farm was published in the Hartlepool Mail from 1992 until 1994. It was also published in a short lived Sunday paper called the News & Echo. In 1994 a new editor joined the Hartlepool Mail who didn't like The Funny Farm and cancelled its run. The demise of the comic strip coincided with Niel moving to London to pursue a career in animation.

In 1997 Niel and Gordon began to develop The Funny Farm as an animated series. The pair travelled to Annecy in France for the annual animation festival. A meeting with Nelvana, a Canadian animation company, led to a three-year option being agreed upon. Three years later Nelvana failed to develop The Funny Farm further, and the show and its rights returned to Bushnell and Fraser.

Fast forward to 2006. After further development the project has been renamed Farmageddon and is being developed by Niel's animation studio, Qurios Entertainment as a 3D project.

From January 2011 the Farmageddon comic strip began to be re-printed on the Birmingham Mail's website as part of the Speech Balloon page.
