= Korky Paul =

British illustrator of children's books (born 1951)

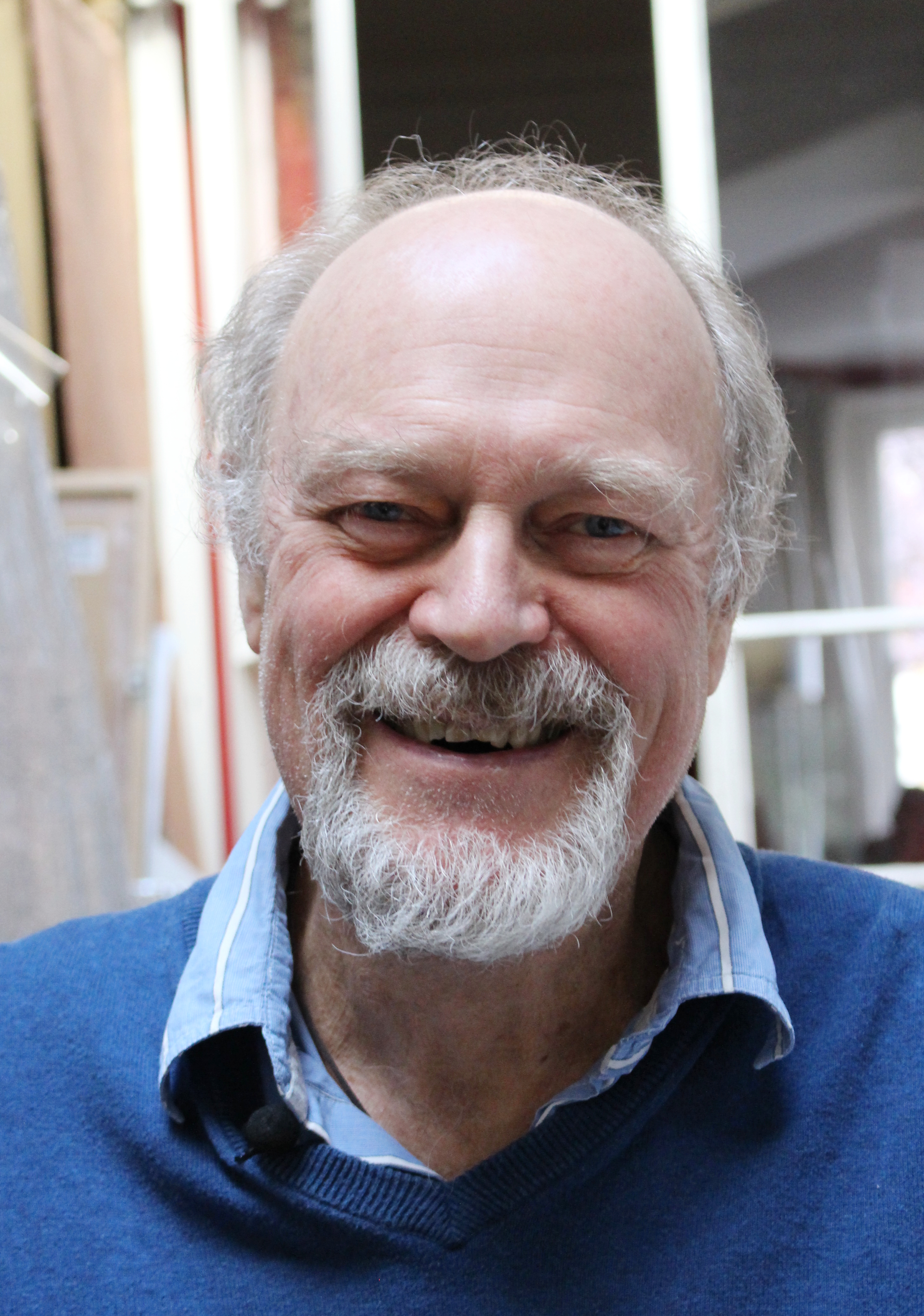
- Paul in 2020
- Born: Hamish Vigne Christie Paul; 1951 (age 73–74); Salisbury, Southern Rhodesia
- Known for: Children's illustrator
- Paul's voice recorded in March 2020
- Website: www.korkypaul.com

Hamish Vigne Christie "Korky" Paul (born 1951) is a British illustrator of children's books. He was born and raised in Rhodesia (now Zimbabwe), but now lives in Oxford, England. His work, characteristically executed with bright watercolour paint and pen and ink, is recognisable by an anarchic yet detailed style and for its "wild characterisation". He is most known for his illustration of the series Winnie the Witch.

== Biography ==
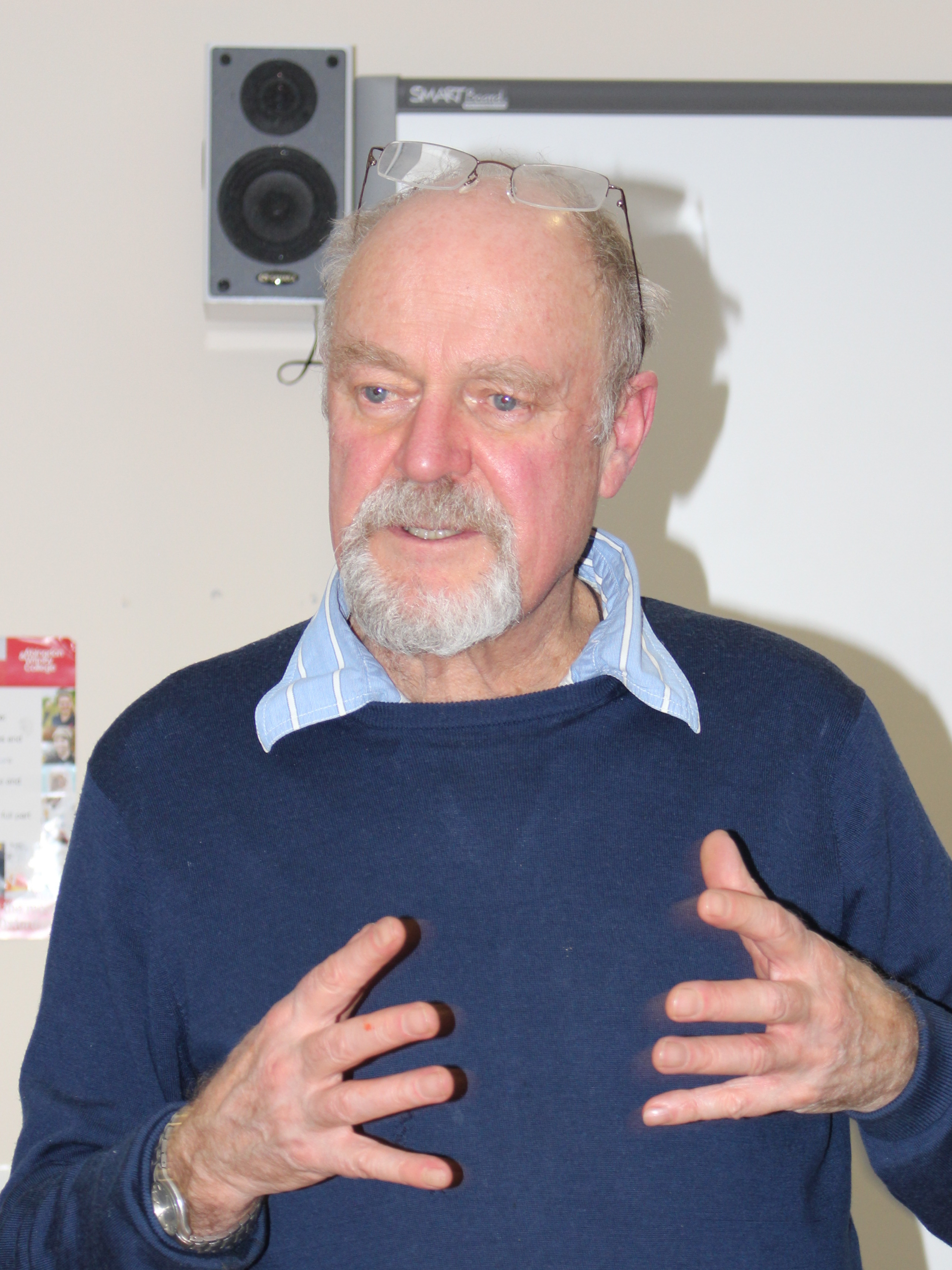
Paul giving a lecture on illustrating children's books

Paul was born in 1951 into a family of seven children in Salisbury, Southern Rhodesia (now Harare, Zimbabwe) where he had what he calls "a wild and privileged childhood" in the African Bushveld.

He went to Estcourt High School before graduating from Durban School of Art in 1972 and working at an advertising agency in Cape Town. In 1976, he travelled to Greece where he met James Watt, then working for a Greek publisher who commissioned Paul to illustrate a series of educational books teaching Greek children to speak the 'Queen's English'.

He then spent some time working in an advertising agency in London and Los Angeles, and then studied film animation under Jules Engel at California Institute of the Arts in Valencia, California. His first children's book was a pop-up called The Crocodile and the Dumper Truck published in 1980, with paper engineering by Ray Marshall.

In 1986, Paul met the editor, Ron Heapy, at Oxford University Press, who looked at his work and commissioned him to draw several pictures for a short book about a witch written by Valerie Thomas as part of OUP's Reading Tree programme. Paul liked the story enough to turn it into a complete picture book. Although this was not strictly within Paul's brief, Heapy nevertheless presented it to the OUP delegates. The resulting book, Winnie the Witch, went on to win the Red House Children's Book Award in 1988 and has since been published in over 10 languages. Paul's illustrations for this are full of visual jokes and witty detail. Since then he has illustrated a further nineteen Winnie the Witch titles that have sold over 7 million copies.

Of Paul's contribution to the success of Winnie and Wilbur, Helen Mortimer of OUP writes, "Winnie is such a loved character. It's partly because the artwork is so distinctive and detailed; there is so much to pour over in every single spread." Of his illustration of Winnie in the books, Paul told the Telegraph: "I didn't want witchy colours... I love throwing in colour, it makes me feel like Jackson Pollock."

Three of Paul's picture books have been adapted for CD-ROM; The Fish Who Could Wish which won the European Multi-Media Award (EMMA) in 1995, Dragon Poems and Winnie the Witch.

His anarchic yet detailed work, executed with bright watercolour paint and pen and ink, is distinguished by its "wild characterisation". It has been compared to Tom and Jerry cartoons, and also to the artists Ronald Searle and Ralph Steadman. He has original artwork on display at The Mazza Collection Galleria, University of Findlay, Findlay, Ohio, US.

Paul lives in Oxford and is married to the artist Susan Moxley. Together they have two children, Oska and Zoë.

Describing the technical details of his work he says: "I use an Apple Mac, Schminke watercolours, Caran d'Ache pencil crayons (with electric sharpener), Saunders Waterford paper 190gm3 [sic], black kandahar and coloured inks with a dip pen, toothbrush, porcupine quills, and my trusty left hand."

In 2015/2016, he was the 7th most borrowed illustrator in UK public libraries.

== Partial bibliography ==
=== Written and Illustrated ===
- The Big Book (Methuen) 1985
- The Fat Book (Methuen) 1985
- The Thin Book (Methuen) 1985
- The Coconut Feast, Orbis (London, England), 1985.
- Adventures with the Creep, Orbis (London, England), 1985.
- The Special Romance, Orbis (London, England), 1985.
- The Fruit Salad Tangle, Orbis (London, England), 1985.
- Billy Bumps Builds a Palace (Oxford University Press) 1995

=== Illustrated ===
==== Winnie the Witch ====
- Valerie Thomas, Winnie the Witch (Kane/Miller) 1987, winner of the Children's Book Award
- Valerie Thomas, Winnie in Winter (Oxford University Press) 1996, shortlisted for the Children's Book Award
- Valerie Thomas, Winnie Flies Again (Oxford University Press) 1999
- Valerie Thomas, Winnie's Magic Wand (Oxford University Press) 2002
- Valerie Thomas, Winnie's New Computer (Oxford University Press) 2003
- 2005 Winnie at the Seaside
- 2006 Winnie's Midnight Dragon
- Valerie Thomas, Happy Birthday Winnie (Oxford University Press) 2008
- 2008 Winnie's Flying Carpet
- 2009 Winnie's Amazing Pumpkin
- 2010 Winnie in Space
- 2011 Winnie Under the Sea
- 2012 Winnie's Dinosaur Day
- 2013 Winnie`s Pirate Adventure
- 2014 Winnie`s Big Bad Robot
- 2015 Winnie's Haunted House
- Valerie Thomas, Winnie and Wilbur in Space (OUP) 2016
- 2016 Winnie & Wilbur Meet Santa
- 2017 Winnie & Wilbur and the Naughty Knight

==== Others ====
- Ray Marshall, Sara Sharpe, The Crocodile and the Dumper Truck: A Reptilian Guide to London (Atheneum) 1982
- Ray Marshall, Cats Up: Purring Pop-Ups (Little Simon) 1982
- Ray Marshall, Doors (Dutton) 1982
- Ray Marshall, Hey Diddle Diddle (Little Simon) 1983
- Ray Marshall, Humpty Dumpty (Little Simon) 1983
- Ray Marshall, Jack and Jill (Little Simon) 1983
- Ray Marshall, Sing a Song of Sixpence (Little Simon) 1983
- John Bush, This Is a Book about Baboons (Kestrel) 1983
- John Bush, This Is a Book about Giraffes (Kestrel) 1983
- John Bush, This Is a Book about Hippos (Kestrel) 1983
- Ray Marshall, Pop-Up Numbers (Dutton) 1984
- Ray Marshall, Pop-Up Addition (Kestrel) 1984
- Ray Marshall, Pop-Up Subtraction (Kestrel) 1984
- Ray Marshall, Pop-Up Multiplication (Kestrel) 1984
- Ray Marshall, Pop-Up Division (Kestrel) 1984
- Keren Kristal, The Brainbox, (Methuen) 1986
- Peter Carter, Captain Teachum's Buried Treasure (Oxford University Press) 1989, shortlisted for the Kate Greenaway Medal
- Tessa Dahl, Gwenda and the Animals (Hamish Hamilton) 1989
- Tandi Jackson, The Wonderhair Restorer (Heinemann) 1990
- John Foster, Never Say Boo to a Ghost (Oxford University Press) 1990
- Tessa Dahl, School Can Wait (Hamish Hamilton) 1990
- Stephen Wyllie, Dinner with Fox (Dial) 1990
- John Bush, The Fish Who Could Wish, (Kane/Miller) 1991
- The Pop-Up Book of Ghost Tales (Harcourt) 1991
- John Foster, Dragon Poems (Oxford University Press) 1991
- Robin Tzannes, Professor Puffendorf's Secret Potions, (Oxford University Press) 1992
- Jonathan Long, The Dog That Dug, (Bodley Head) 1992, shortlisted for the Kate Greenaway Medal
- Shen Roddie, Mrs. Wolf (Tango) 1992
- Robin Tzannes, The Great Robbery (Tango) 1993
- Robin Tzannes, Sanji and the Baker, (Oxford University Press) 1993
- John Foster, compiler, Dinosaur Poems (Oxford University Press) 1993
- Robin Tzannes, Mookie Goes Fishing (Oxford University Press) 1994
- Jonathan Long, The Cat That Scratched (Bodley Head) 1994
- Jeanne Willis, The Rascally Cake, (Andersen Press) (London, England), 1994, winner of the Children's Book Award
- Peter Tabern, Pirates, (Andersen Press) 1994
- Peter Tabern, Blood and Thunder (Andersen Press) 1994
- Peter Harris, Have You Seen Max? (Aladdin) 1994
- Michel Piquemal, The Monster Book of Horrible Horrors, translated by Peter Haswell, (Bodley Head) 1995
- John Foster, compiler, Monster Poems (Oxford University Press) 1995
- Jonathan Long, The Duck That Had No Luck (Bodley Head) 1996, shortlisted for the Kate Greenaway Medal
- Julianna Bethlen, Dracula Junior and the Fake Fangs, paper engineering by Richard Ferguson (Dial) 1996
- John Foster, compiler, Magic Poems (Oxford University Press) 1997
- Vivian French, reteller, Aesop's Funky Fables (Hamish Hamilton) 1997
- John Foster, compiler, Dragons, Dinosaurs, and Monster Poems (Oxford University Press) 1998
- John Agard, Brer Rabbit: The Great Tug-o-War, (Barron's Educational) 1998
- Teresa Lynch, Call Me Sam, (Oxford University Press) 1998.
- W. J. Corbett, The Battle of Chinnbrook Wood, (Hodder) 1998
- Jonathan Long, The Wonkey Donkey (Bodley Head) 1999
- Michael Rosen, Lunch Boxes Don't Fly, (Puffin Books) 1999
- John Foster, compiler, Pet Poems (Oxford University Press) 2000
- Vivian French, reteller, Funky Tales (Hamish Hamilton) 2000
- Michael Rosen, Uncle Billy Being Silly (Puffin Books) 2001
- John Foster, compiler, Fantastic Football Poems (Oxford University) 2001
- Michael Rosen, No Breathing in Class (Puffin Books) 2002
- Paul Rogers, Tiny (Bodley Head) 2002
- Mary Arrigan, Pa Jinglebob: The Fastest Knitter in the West (Egmont) 2002
- Jon Blake, The Deadly Secret of Dorothy W. (Hodder) 2003
- Giles Andreae, Sir Scallywag and the Golden Underpants (Oxford University Press) 2012

Paul has also illustrated books for The Prison Phoenix Trust, sent to prisoners free of charge:

- Freeing the Spirit through Meditation and Yoga by Sandy Chubb and Sister Elaine MacInnes, 2005
- Yoga Without Words by Sandy Chubb and Jo Child, 2008

=== News articles ===
- Paul, Korky (24 March 2015). "Korky Paul: how to illustrate books – in pictures". The Guardian. ISSN 0261-3077.
