= National Share-a-Story Month =

English annual event to promote reading to children

National Share-a-Story Month (NSSM) is an annual event in the United Kingdom that is used to promote reading to children.

It is used by librarians, schools, the book industry, bloggers and parents as a way to focus on storytelling in the broadest of senses. Local groups of The Federation of Children's Book Groups often hold special events to celebrate the month, such as author visits, book readings and other activities.

== History ==
The NSSM has originated as National Tell-A-Story Week in 1974, the idea of Pat Triggs, Vice-Chair of The Federation of Children's Book Groups at the time. In 1998 it was decided to extend the idea to one month and the event became the National Share-A-Story Month.
