= Dual narrative =

Narrative form

A dual narrative is a form of narrative that tells a story in two different perspectives, usually from two different people. A dual narrative is also an effective technique that can be used to tell the story of people (or one person) at two different points in time (Postcards from No Man's Land, Great Expectations, Stone Cold). It is used to show parallels or emphasise differences in the lifestyles or points-of-view of different places or time periods.

An integral aspect of the dual narrative is how both aspects of the narrative interweave with one another to encompass the 'narrative progression' of a story. This progression entails more than just the development of the plot, but rather the characters, the author, the reader, and how each are in constant relay with one another.
