= Jennifer Killick =

English author of children's horror fiction

- Born: October 1983 (age 42)
- Education: Brunel University London (MA)
- Years active: 2016–present
- Website: www.jenniferkillick.com

Jennifer Killick is an English author of children's horror fiction. Her work, which includes the Crater Lake (2020–2021) and Dread Wood (2022–2024) series, has received a number of accolades, including a Children's Book Award.

== Early life ==
Killick was interested in writing from a young age but did not initially pursue it. She later pursued a Master of Arts (MA) at Brunel University London.

== Career ==
Killick wrote the first draft of her debut Alex Sparrow and the Really Big Stink for her Creative Writing MA. After pitching it to no avail, she rewrote it under the mentorship of the Golden Egg Academy's Imogen Cooper. In 2016, Firefly acquired the rights to publish Killick's debut novel Alex Sparrow and the Really Big Stink in 2017. Alex Sparrow and the Furry Fury and Alex Sparrow and the Zumbie Apocalypse, released in 2018 and 2019 respectively, completed the trilogy. Announced in 2019, Killick reunited with Firefly for the publication of the Year 6 adventure book Crater Lake in 2020 and its sequel Evolution in 2021. Crater Lake was named children's book of the week by Alex O'Connell in The Times and shortlisted for Best Crime Novel for Children (ages 8-12) at the 2022 CrimeFest Awards. Also in 2019 came the standalone book Mo, Lottie and the Junkers, illustrated by Gareth Conway.

Killick moved to Farshore (a HarperCollins UK imprint) for the publication of her next comedy horror series, starting with a two-book deal for Dread Wood, published in 2022, and its sequel Fear Ground. Dread Wood won the 2023 Children's Book Award in the Older Readers category. The novel was also commended at the Fantastic Book Awards and won the 2024 Bolton Children's Fiction Award. Farshore would acquire further installments in the Dread Wood series. One of those installments Creepy Creations appeared on the 2024 World Book Day list. The series ended with Terror Tower in 2024.

This was followed by the book Dread Detention and its sequel Screech School. Killick's forthcoming series is called Serial Chillers.

== Personal life ==
Killick lives in Uxbridge with her husband. Including from previous relationships, they have five children between them. She was diagnosed with ulcerative colitis at the age of 28 while pregnant with her son.

== Bibliography ==
=== Alex Sparrow ===
- Alex Sparrow and the Really Big Stink (2017)
- Alex Sparrow and the Furry Fury (2018)
- Alex Sparrow and the Zumbie Apocalypse (2019)

=== Crater Lake ===
- Crater Lake (2020)
- Evolution (2021)

=== Dread Wood ===
- Dread Wood (2022)
- Fear Ground (2022)
- Flock Horror (2023)
- Deadly Deep (2023)
- Fright Bite (2024)
  - Creepy Creations (2024)
- Terror Tower (2024)

=== Creatures & Teachers ===
- Dread Detention (2024)
- Screech School

=== Standalones ===
- Mo, Lottie and the Junkers (2019)
- Serial Chillers: The Witch in the Woods (2025)

=== Edited volumes ===
- Read, Scream, Repeat: Thirteen Spine-tingling Tales (2023)

== Awards and honours ==
Year	Award	Category	Title	Result	Ref.
2022	CrimeFest Awards	Best Crime Novel for Children (ages 8-12)	Crater Lake	Nominated	
2023	Fantastic Book Awards		Dread Wood	Won	
2023	Children's Book Award	Older Readers	Dread Wood	Won	
2023	Bolton Children's Fiction Award		Dread Wood	Won	
