= Paul Geraghty =

British based author and illustrator of children's picture books

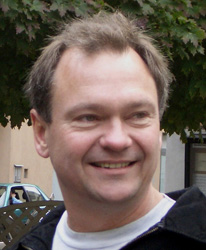
- Paul Geraghty
- Born: 3 May 1959 (age 67)
- Education: Natal University
- Occupation: Author-Illustrator
- Writing career
- Genres: Picture Books and Children's Fiction
- Notable works: Pig, Solo, Dinosaur in Danger
- Notable awards: Red House Children's Book Award, Young Africa Award
- Website: www.paul-geraghty.com

Paul Geraghty (born 3 May 1959, in Durban, South Africa) is a British based author and illustrator of children's picture books. He also writes teenage fiction and won the Young Africa Award for his first novel Pig.

== Background ==
His master read Fine Arts and English at Natal University, South Africa and holds a Higher Diploma in Education. After teaching for two years in Cape Town he took a copywriter's job in advertising. There he met John Bush, who would later go on to collaborate with him on three picture books. Since 1986 he has lived in London, UK.

Translated into over 20 languages internationally, his work has won various awards, including the Red House Children's Book Award for Solo in 1996.

In 2008, he translated the ancient Indian ethical treatise of the Tirukkural into Fijian.

A frequent lecturer and live illustrator on the literary circuit.

He is also a musician, photographer and extensive traveller.

== Picture books ==
(Illustrated in watercolour, unless otherwise stated)

- The Giraffe who Got in a Knot (Written by John Bush) (1987)
- The Cross-with-us Rhinoceros (Written by John Bush) (1988)
- Over the Steamy Swamp (1988)
- The Great Knitting Needle Hunt (1989)
- The Bungle in the Jungle (Written by John Bush) (1989)
- What on Earth was That? (1990)
- Look out, Patrick! (1990)
- Slobcat (1991)
- Monty’s Journey (1992)
- The Great Green Forest (1992)
- The Hunter (1994)
- Solo (1995)
- The Wonderful Journey (Oil on canvas) (1999)
- Tortuga (2000)
- The Hoppameleon (2001)
- Dinosaur in Danger (2004)
- Rotten & Rascal (The Two Terrible Pterosaur Twins) (Mixed media illustrations) (2006)
- Help Me! (2010)

== Novels ==
- Pig (1988)
- Tina Come Home (1991)
