= Robert Swindells =

British author (born 1939)

Robert E. Swindells (born 20 March 1939) is an English author of children's and young adult fiction. He is most notable for writing the young adult novel Stone Cold, which won the annual Carnegie Medal from the CILIP, recognizing the year's outstanding children's book by a British subject.

== Biography ==
Born in Bradford, Yorkshire, Swindells worked for a newspaper after leaving school aged 15. He served with the Royal Air Force and held various jobs before training as a Primary school teacher. While in training he wrote his first novel, When Darkness Comes, which was published by Brockhampton Press of Stenhousemuir in 1973. He combined writing with teaching until 1980 when he took up writing full-time. He was still writing as of his 71st birthday (20 March 2010).

He first won the Red House Children's Book Award with Brother in the Land (1984), a novel set in a post-apocalyptic world. Swindells was a supporter of the Campaign for Nuclear Disarmament and is quoted as saying that the work "came out of my own anger and frustration ... you can't kill selectively with nuclear weapons, you wipe out millions of people". He won three more Red House awards for Room 13 (1989), Nightmare Stairs (Short novel, 1998) and Blitzed (Younger readers, 2003).

In a 2010 by-election and in the 2011 local elections, Swindells stood as the Green Party of England and Wales candidate for the Worth Valley ward of Bradford City Council. In 2010, he took 11% of the vote, putting him in third place.

== Awards ==
Swindells has won several annual book awards.

- 1985 Red House Children's Book Award, Brother in the Land
- 1990 Red House Children's Book Award, Room 13
- 1993 Carnegie Medal, Stone Cold
- 1998 Red House Children's Book Award Short Novel, Nightmare Stairs
- 1998 Angus Book Award, Unbeliever
- 2003 Red House Children's Book Award Younger Readers, Blitzed

Runners up, etc.

- 1984 Carnegie Medal high commendation, Brother in the Land (Note: Today there are usually eight books on the Carnegie shortlist. CCSU lists 32 "Highly Commended" runners up for the Carnegie Medal from 1966 to 2002 but only three before 1979 when the distinction became approximately annual. There were 29 "HC" books in 24 years including Swindells alone in 1984.)
- 2001 Hampshire Book Award shortlist, Ruby Tanya

== Selected works ==
- When Darkness Comes (1973)
- A Candle in the Night (1974)
- Voyage to Valhalla (1976)
- Ice Palace (1977)
- The Weather Clerk (1979)
- Ghost Ship to Ganymede (1980)
- World-Eater (1983)
- Brother in the Land (1984)
- The Thousand Eyes of Night (1985)
- Staying Up (1986)
- A Serpent's Tooth (1988)
- Room 13 (1989)
- Follow a Shadow (1989)
- Daz 4 Zoe (1990)
- Stone Cold (1993)
- Timesnatch (1994)
- Inside The Worm (1994)
- Unbeliever (1995)
- Jacqueline Hyde (1996)
- The Last Bus (1996)
- Nightmare Stairs (1997)
- Smash! (1997)
- Hurricane Summer (1997)
- Abomination (1998)
- Dosh (1999)
- Invisible! (1999)
- The Orchard Book of Egyptian Gods and Pharaohs (2000)
- Doodlebug Alley (2000)
- A Wish for Wings (2001)
- Wrecked (2001)
- Blitzed (2002)
- No Angels (2003)
- Ruby Tanya (2004)
- Roger's War (2004)
- Branded (2005)
- Snapshot (2005)
- Snakebite (2006)
- In the Nick of Time (2007)
- Burnout (2007)
- The Shade of Hettie Daynes (2008)
- The Tunnel (2008)
- Blitzed (2008)
- A Skull in Shadows Lane (2012)
- The Deep End (2013)
- The Ghosts of Givenham Mansion (2021)
