= Love & Monsters =

Love & Monsters may refer to:

- "Love & Monsters" (Doctor Who), an episode of Doctor Who
- Love and Monsters (film), a 2020 American post-apocalyptic monster adventure film

== See also ==
- Love Monster (disambiguation)
