= Daz 4 Zoe =

1990 novel by Robert Swindells

- First edition
- Author: Robert Swindells
- Language: English
- Genre: Young adult fiction
- Publisher: Hamish Hamilton
- Publication date: 1990
- Publication place: United Kingdom
- Media type: Print (Hardback and Paperback)
- Pages: 165 pp
- ISBN: 0-241-12898-6
- OCLC: 36351003

Daz 4 Zoe is a young-adult novel by Robert Swindells. It explores themes of social division, class conflict, and forbidden love in a dystopian future Britain. The story follows two protagonists Zoe, a 'subbie' (from the suburbs of Silverdale) and Daz a 'chippy' (from the city of Rawhampton) from opposite sides of a segregated society. The novel is written in a dual narrative style, alternating between Zoe and Daz's first-person perspectives. Swindells uses phonetic spelling and poor grammar for Daz's chapters to reflect his lack of education, contrasting with Zoe's more formal narration. The novel discusses the microcosm of the 'chippies' and the 'subbies' in order to discuss the ridge between the bourgeoisie and the proletariat in a dystopian future where those living in cities do not have suffrage, and the elite suburb-dwellers control the nation.

== Plot ==
In Daz 4 Zoe, the 'Subbies' reside in the suburbs of Silverdale, a large fictional city, while the 'Chippies' inhabit the run-down urban area. The children from the suburbs often engage in an activity known as chippying, which involves visiting nightclubs in Rawhampton. This behavior has led to televised advertisements warning of the dangers associated with chippying.

Zoe is a close friend of Tabitha, who is the daughter of a wealthy real estate developer. Tabitha persuades Zoe to accompany her on a chippying outing, along with Ned and Larry. Ned drives the group to the Blue Moon nightclub, where they encounter Daz. To leave the suburb, they inform the guard that they are visiting Zoe's cousin in the neighboring suburb and present their ID cards to the bouncers at the Silverdale gate.

Zoe and Daz experience an immediate romantic connection upon meeting, though Zoe initially attributes her feelings to the effects of a drink called the lobotomizer, a mixture of coke, rum, and other ingredients.

Meanwhile, Larry notices an attractive chippy girl and attempts to get her attention. She responds with a smile out of embarrassment, which Larry misinterprets as interest. Eventually, he calls out to her loudly during a pause in the music. Her boyfriend reacts by picking up a chair and approaching Larry, but a policeman intervenes. The chippy girl throws the chair, which Larry deflects with his arm. Daz then comes to the group's aid, urging them to flee.

Upon returning to Silverdale, Zoe realizes she has fallen in love with Daz and begins to long for him. Her grandmother shares a story of her own youthful romance with a man named Gordon Payne, who never reciprocated her feelings. She cautions Zoe that relationships between Subbies and Chippies are not meant to be.
