= Kiss the Dust =

1991 novel by Elizabeth Laird

- First edition (UK)
- Author: Elizabeth Laird
- Language: English
- Genre: Children novel
- Publisher: William Heinemann (UK); Dutton Children's Books (US)
- Publication date: 1991 (UK), 1992 (US)
- Publication place: UK, US
- Media type: Print (Hardback)
- Pages: 278 pages
- ISBN: 0525448934
- OCLC: 25007525

Kiss the Dust is a 1991 novel by Elizabeth Laird on the conflicts between the Iraqi Kurds and Saddam Hussein's regime. It is a young adult historical fiction novel about a twelve-year-old Kurdish girl and her family's escape from Iraq over the border into Iran. The book was originally published in Great Britain by William Heinemann in 1991. It was first published in the US by Dutton Children's Books, a division of Penguin Books in 1992.

== Plot summary ==
When Tara Hawrami is returning from school one day, she witnesses Iranian troops shoot a mullah and an innocent boy reading a newspaper in broad daylight, it sight changes her thinking forever. However, when she returns home she is stunned when her mother, Teriska Khan shows a very muted reaction; Teriska Khan reveals that she and Tara's father have been concealing the horrors of the ongoing war between Iraq and Iran from Tara, including shootings like the one Tara had witnessed. That night, an injured intruder enters Tara's house, who turns out to be her Uncle Rostam, a Pesh Murga resistance fighter. The following morning, Tara's father, Kak Soran, suddenly returns with Tara's brother, Ashti, and her grandmother from Baghdad. Tara's life changes quickly and drastically from that moment on.

When Rostam and Ashti leave to join the resistance fighters, the Peshmergas, Kak Soran is soon forced to go into hiding as well when the authorities suspect he has been indirectly supporting the pesh murgas. Tara's apprehension only grows when the rest of her family must escape into a village in the mountains soon afterward. Life in the mountains is peaceful, but boring for Tara until the area ends up being bombed repeatedly, injuring Tara. When Ashti arrives in the village after being injured, Kak Soran and Teriska Khan plan a risky escape to Iran through the mountains all the way to Iran where they wind up in a refugee camp for several months. Ashti, fearing conscription into the Iranian army, runs back to Iraq while Teriska Khan becomes very ill and sad as her son does not return for many months. Gradually Teriska Khan does recover after Tara finds a friendly neighbour willing to help. Tara has to care of her mother and younger sister Hero, until Teriska Khan recovers. Kak Soran's connections eventually come through and Tara's family manages to find help in the form of Kak Soran's cousin. However, with no available jobs in Iran, the family realizes that they must escape the country to become refugees in another country. Using the last of their savings, the family manages to arrive in London, where they apply for refugee status.

In London, Kak Soran manages to get in contact with a family friend (Latif), who offers them a place to stay. In every place that Tara has been displaced to, she has experienced culture shock and needed to adjust quickly; At first the family has a hard time getting used to the new language and the new lifestyle. Tara's English gradually improves and despite the traumatic experiences she has endured, she manages to make some friends at her new school. Her family is overjoyed they hear that Ashti will soon arrive in London after several years apart. Though their new life is difficult and less comfortable than their old home in Iraq, Tara learns not to take anything for granted. The family gets back together and begins to live a better, new life.

== History ==
The story is based on a Kurdish family living in Sulaymaniyah, a city in northeastern Iraq in 1984 during a time of war.

== Awards ==
- Winner of the 1992 Red House Children's Book Award
- Winner of the Sheffield Book Award
- Winner of the Royal Dutch Geographical Society Glass Globe Award
- Winner of the World Books

== Footnotes ==
1. Information on the Book
