= Stone Cold (Swindells novel) =

1993 book by Robert Swindells

- First edition
- Author: Robert Swindells
- Cover artist: Paul Hunt
- Language: English
- Genre: Young adult fiction,
- Publisher: Heinemann
- Publication date: 1993
- Publication place: United Kingdom
- Media type: Print (hardcover)
- Pages: 132 pp (first edition)
- ISBN: 0-241-13300-9
- OCLC: 31627736

Stone Cold is a young-adult novel by Robert Swindells, published by Heinemann in 1993. Set in Bradford and on the streets of London, the first-person narrative switches between Link, a newly-homeless young man adjusting to his situation, and Shelter, an ex-army officer scorned after being dismissed from his job, supposedly on "medical grounds", with a sinister motive.

== Plot ==
The story, told in a dual narrative, follows Link and Shelter and their experience of homelessness. After Link's father abandons his family, Link's mother starts a relationship with a new boyfriend, Vincent, who forces Link out of the family home in Bradford. Link, now homeless, decides to travel to Camden, London. He tries to get used to his surroundings and is soon assaulted by another homeless person. Soon after this, he meets Ginger, a streetwise homeless man, who takes him under his wing. Link and Ginger work together and become friends.

Meanwhile, Shelter is busy with his own task. A sociopathic ex-army member dismissed for "medical reasons", he is convinced that he must "clear" the streets of the homeless population. He begins abducting and murdering victims, hiding them under the floor of his room and dressing them in army clothes. Shelter also explains his techniques to committing successful murders. Once, when Link and Ginger beg for money, they come across Shelter but do not know who he is. Shelter, however, notices them and plots to murder them.

Whilst Link and Ginger talk about where to stay, Ginger mentions about a man named Captain Hook (real name Probyn) who owns boathouses for homeless people to stay in. They stay in a boat for a night. The next day, while Ginger talks to his friends, he overhears that Doggy Bag, another homeless person, has gone missing. Link does not suspect anything suspicious.

One day, Ginger decides to meet his old friends in Holborn. Link waits for him, but he doesn't return. It transpires that Shelter has abducted Ginger by telling him that Link was at his apartment, badly injured. Link talks to Toya, one of Ginger's friends, in order to get information on Ginger's whereabouts. Unfortunately, Toya does not know anything. Toya agrees with Link to find Ginger for him.

Link then makes a resolution to only worry about himself, but this is soon broken when he meets a mysterious young woman named Gail. He develops a crush on her and they "doss" together and begin to piece the puzzle together, tracing clues to track down Shelter. Soon after, Toya's father approaches them as Toya also goes missing. Link tries his best to give whereabouts. Nick, a man who sells the newspaper under Camden Station, tells Link that he saw both Ginger and Toya go with Shelter and vanish. Gail also acts more secretive, taking phone calls more often.

After getting Shelter's address from Captain Hook and spying on Shelter in case he is the reason of the murders, Gail takes a long telephone call and Link wanders off by himself, where he is approached by an old man. Unbeknownst to Link, it is Shelter, who uses the excuse of a free shelter and hostel to lure Link into a building.

Shelter invites Link over to his apartment and Link explores the house until he finds his watch, which was taken by the homeless person that assaulted him. Shelter then reveals who he really is and Link realises that Shelter is the murderer. Shelter and Link then get into a fight. Shelter shows Link the bodies of Ginger, and six others (two of which are hinted to be Toya and Doggy bag) that he has put under the floorboards. Shelter then almost kills Link by suffocating him. However, luckily, Gail is able to summon the police in time, and Shelter is arrested.

Link then questions Gail how she managed to summon the police even though she is homeless, and Gail reveals the truth — Gail isn't truly homeless, but turns out to be Louise Bain, a journalist who had posed as such in order to write an "authentic" story about homelessness.

Link feels betrayed and is angry with Gail. Gail then gives money to Link, and then tearfully leaves Link alone once again. Link ponders the unjustness of a world where he is homeless and hungry, while a murderer like Shelter is housed in a warm prison with three meals a day.

== Background ==
With Stone Cold, Robert Swindells sought to inspire sympathy and understanding in young readers for the struggles of homeless teenagers. He was inspired to write a book about the homeless after being angered by a comment made by the Minister of Housing, George Young, who said that homeless people were “the sort of people one steps on when coming out of the opera”. The working title of the book was originally Out of the Opera (Note: In another source, Swindells is quoted as saying that the original title was Leaving the Opera.) before later being changed to Paved with Cold and finally settling on Stone Cold. As part of his research for the book, Swindell spent three nights sleeping outside on Camden High Street in London, where he talked to a number of homeless people. The character of Shelter was based on a drill instructor from when Swindells was a recruit in the RAF.

== Awards ==
In 1994, Stone Cold was awarded the Carnegie Medal for Writing for 1993.

== Adaptations ==
In 1997, the novel was adapted for a television series of the same title, starring James Gaddas, Peter Howitt and Elizabeth Rider, and produced by Andy Rowley. It was nominated for a Best Children's Drama Award at BAFTA. The short series was shown on Scene.

== See also ==
- Homelessness in the United Kingdom

== Notes ==
Awards
Preceded by Flour Babies	Carnegie Medal recipient 1993	Succeeded by Whispers in the Graveyard
