= Land of the Lost =

Land of the Lost may refer to:

== Film and television ==
=== Film ===
- Land of the Lost (film), a 2009 American comedy
- The Land of the Lost, a 1914 film starring Arthur Donaldson
- The Land of the Lost, a 1948 Noveltoons cartoon

=== Television ===
- Land of the Lost (1974 TV series), a children's television series
- Land of the Lost (1991 TV series), a remake of the 1974 series
- "Land of the Lost" (Land of the Giants), a 1969 episode
- "Land of the Lost" (Legends of Tomorrow), a 2017 episode

== Music ==
=== Albums ===
- Land of the Lost (Wipers album), 1986
- Land of the Lost, by the Freeze, 1984

=== Songs ===
- "Land of the Lost", by Bleach from Static, 1998
- "Land of the Lost", by Cella Dwellas, 1994
- "Land of the Lost", by Death Cube K from Dreamatorium, 1994
- "Land of the Lost", by Doctor Steel, 2004
- "Land of the Lost", by Green Velvet from Green Velvet, 2000
- "Land of the Lost", by Parkway Drive from Darker Still, 2022
- "Land of the Lost", by South Park Mexican from The 3rd Wish: To Rock the World, 1999
- "Land of the Lost", by X-Raided from Unforgiven, 1999

== Other uses ==
- Land of the Lost (radio series), a 1943–1948 American radio drama by Isabel Manning Hewson
- Land of the Lost, a fictional place in the 2021 children's book The Christmas Pig by J. K. Rowling
