= Qurios Entertainment =

British animation studio

- Industry: Animation
- Founded: 2002; 24 years ago
- Defunct: 2013; 13 years ago

Qurios Entertainment was an animation and visual effects production studio.

Founded in 2002 by Niel Bushnell and his wife Diane, the company was originally based in Hartlepool, England, relocating to Newcastle upon Tyne in February 2009. As well as producing animation for commercials Qurios has a string of TV credits, including Hyperdrive, Spooks, Tracy Beaker Returns and The Dumping Ground. In 2010 Qurios merged with Dene Films, a Newcastle upon Tyne based live action production company. In 2013 they animated the missing episodes of the Doctor Who serial The Ice Warriors for its DVD release.

In 2013 both Qurios and Dene Films closed. Since the closure Niel Bushnell has established himself as a children's author and Production Manager Chris Chatterton has become a picturebook illustrator.
