= The Suitcase Kid =

1992 children's novel by Jacqueline Wilson

- First edition
- Author: Jacqueline Wilson
- Illustrator: Nick Sharratt
- Language: English
- Genre: Children's novel
- Publisher: Doubleday
- Publication date: 1992
- Publication place: United Kingdom
- Media type: Print
- Pages: 154 pp (first edition)

The Suitcase Kid is a 1992 children's novel written by Jacqueline Wilson and illustrated by Nick Sharratt. The story focuses upon a young girl, Andy, caught between her warring parents' bitter divorce, and the determination Andy has to get her parents back together (as is common amongst children whose parents are divorcing). However, as the story proceeds, Andy realizes that she has to accept that her parents will not reunite and that she must move on like they did.

== Plot ==
Andrea West, known as Andy in the story, a tall and feisty ten-year-old whose parents have recently divorced. Andy cannot choose between living with her Mum and her new family, or her Dad and his new family, so the social worker suggests she lives one week with Mum and one week with Dad. Andy is having to move to each house every week and it is very tiring. This leads to Andy feeling as if she lives out of a suitcase. Her mother has remarried a man called Bill, (whom Andy calls "Bill the Baboon"). Andy has a strong dislike for him, as well as his other three children (especially Katie, a spiteful girl five days older than Andy, who Andy is forced to share a bedroom with and calls Andy "Andy Pandy"). Her father has remarried Carrie, who has twins Zen and Crystal and is pregnant with her dad's new baby. Andy doesn't mind Carrie and her kids as much as she does Bill and his, but she still wishes she could have her dad to herself.

Throughout the book, Andy wishes that her parents would get back together and move back into their previous little house, named Mulberry Cottage. Andy loses focus at school, getting poorer results, and loses touch with her previous best friend, Aileen. As she becomes more and more isolated, she draws comfort from her spotted Sylvanian Families rabbit, Radish, often playing imaginary games with her.

One day she finds a secret garden with mulberries growing in it, just like her old house Mulberry Cottage, and she begins to go there after school. As she feels her life unravelling, she spends longer and longer in the garden. One day, startled by the owners of the garden, she accidentally drops Radish down a tree and can't get her out. She is forced to flee and leave without Radish. Currently on a "mum's house week", Andy runs away in the middle of the night to get Radish after being tormented by Katie. Her parents are very worried but soon find her. Andy insists that she must go and find Radish, and they meet the owners of the garden, Mr and Mrs Peters, who soon befriend Andy, acting as honorary grandparents, giving kind gifts to her and Radish.

By the end of the book, Andy has befriended her step-siblings (with the exception of Katie, though she has now learned to ignore her torment) and has reluctantly accepted that her parents are not getting back together.

== Character list ==
- Andrea West (Andy) - The main character and protagonist, who gets caught in the middle of her parents' divorce.
- Radish - Andy's beloved Sylvanian Families rabbit to whom she often talks to about her problems. She often insists that Radish is not a toy, but a mascot.
- Mum (Carol) - Andy's mother.
- Dad (Simon) - Andy's father.
- Bill (The Baboon or Un-Uncle Bill) - Andy's mother's new partner, a painter and decorator. Though he is a mild-mannered father who cares for his kids, Andy is disdainful of him, even going as far as to make a wish that he will fall off his ladder.
- Paula - Bill's outgoing teenage daughter from his previous marriage.
- Graham - Bill's timid tween son from a previous marriage. Andy is not fond of him at first, but eventually befriends him after he makes a boat for Radish.
- Katie - Bill's sly and spoiled youngest daughter from his previous marriage. Although she is the same age as Andy, she is treated as if she is much younger. Katie calls Andy "Andy Pandy", often instigating feuds between herself and Andy by winding her up and playing the victim when Andy stands up for herself. It's soon revealed that she is afraid of going to sleep due to her mother dying in her sleep following an illness when she was younger.
- Carrie - Andy's father's new partner, a dreamy, hippyish woman who is kind to Andy, yet Andy resists all attempts to bond with her in the hopes that her father will leave Carrie and reunite with her mother. She flat out refuses to have junk food of any kind in the flat.
- Zen and Crystal - Carrie's two five-year-old twins from a previous marriage. Zen is rowdy and boisterous, while Crystal is timid and friendly.
- Aileen - An old friend of Andy, from whom she has drifted apart since the divorce of Andrea's parents.
- Fiona - A girl whom Aileen befriends.
- Miss Maynard - The headmistress of Andy's school.
- Mr. Roberts - The owner of a sweet shop that Andy, Graham and Katie visit at the weekends, who once referred to Andy within earshot as "The Jolly Green Giant".
- Mr. and Mrs. Peters - A kind elderly couple whom Andy befriends towards the end of the book.
- Zoe (originally Ethel) - The newborn daughter of Andy's father and Carrie, born at the end of the book, whom Andy takes a shine to.

== References in other Jacqueline Wilson books ==
The Suitcase Kid is mentioned in two other novels by Jacqueline Wilson. In Girls Out Late, Russell tells Ellie that after his parents divorce he used to spend one week with his mum, and one week with his dad. Ellie says that she once read a book about a girl like that. In Clean Break the protagonist Em and her friend Jenny discuss a book called Piggy in the Middle by Jenna Williams, that has a plotline almost identical to that of The Suitcase Kid; in fact Radish wasn't a Sylvanian Families rabbit at all—it was a pig who went by the name of Turnip.
