= Winnie the Witch =

Picture book series by Valerie Thomas

Winnie the Witch (also known as Winnie and Wilbur since 2016) is a series of twenty nine picture books, written by Valerie Thomas and illustrated by Korky Paul. More than seven million books have been sold of the series, and it has been translated into more than 10 languages.

Following on from the success of the picture books, a series of 'young fiction' Winnie the Witch books were written by Laura Owen, also illustrated by Korky Paul. An animated series based on the books was initially produced for Milkshake!, but only two episodes aired as specials.

== Book series ==
Winnie the Witch
- First edition
- Author: Valerie Thomas
- Illustrator: Korky Paul
- Language: English
- Genre: Children's literature
- Publisher: Oxford University Press
- Publication date: 1987
- Publication place: United Kingdom
- Pages: 32 pages
- ISBN: 0-19-272683-8
- OCLC: 67869241

The original book Winnie the Witch was first published in 1987. It was reprinted nine times up until 1997 and re-issued with a new cover in 2006. In 2016, the book series was rebranded from Winnie The Witch to Winnie and Wilbur.

Valerie Thomas has worked for many years in education, teaching in schools in Australia and the UK. Korky Paul is an illustrator of children's books. In 1986, he illustrated his first book for Oxford University Press, Winnie the Witch, which won the Red House Children's Book Award in 1988.

=== Winnie The Witch (1987) ===
Winnie can't find her cat Wilbur in her house, because both her house and Wilbur are black. So she uses magic to turn Wilbur into a variety of colours, each one of which leads to a variety of mishaps and makes Wilbur miserable. In the end, Winnie turns Wilbur back to his original colour and changes the colour of her house instead.

=== Bibliography ===
- 1987 - Winnie the Witch
- 1996 - Winnie in Winter
- 1999 - Winnie Flies Again (The Broomstick Ride)
- 2002 - Winnie's Magic Wand
- 2003 - Winnie's New Computer
- 2005 - Winnie at the Seaside
- 2006 - Winnie's Midnight Dragon
- 2007 - Happy Birthday, Winnie
- 2008 - Winnie's Flying Carpet
- 2009 - Winnie's Amazing Pumpkin
- 2010 - Winnie in Space
- 2011 - Winnie Under the Sea
- 2012 - Winnie's Dinosaur Day
- 2013 - Winnie's Pirate Adventure
- 2014 - Winnie's Big Bad Robot
- 2015 - Winnie's Haunted House
- 2016 - Winnie And Wilbur: Meet Santa
- 2017 - Winnie And Wilbur: The Naughty Knight
- 2018 - Winnie And Wilbur: The Monster Mystery
- 2019 - Winnie And Wilbur: The Bug Safari
- 2020 - Winnie And Wilbur: At Chinese New Year
- 2020 - Winnie And Wilbur: Stay at Home (eBook only)
- 2020 - Winnie And Wilbur: Around The World
- 2021 - Winnie And Wilbur: Winnie's Best Friend
- 2022 - Winnie And Wilbur: The Festival Of Witches
- 2023 - Winnie And Wilbur: The Witches' Sports Day
- 2024 - Winnie And Wilbur: Winnie's Witchy Bedtime
- 2025 - Winnie And Wilbur: Looking for Wilbur
- 2026 - Winnie And Wilbur: The Big Storm

== Television series ==
Winnie the Witch was adopted into a British animated children's television series titled "Winnie and Wilbur". The first two episodes of the series, following the adventures of witch Winnie (voiced by Katy Brand), and her black cat Wilbur (voiced by Bill Bailey), debuted on Discovery Kids in Latin America on 17 December 2016, and on Milkshake! in the United Kingdom on 24 December. The first season was set for 52 11-minute episodes, but only two episodes were aired before its cancellation.

=== Episodes ===
No.	Title	Directed by	Written by	Original release date
1	"Wilbur's Big Clean"	Leo Nielsen	Ema Čulík	24 December 2016 (Note: This episode first aired on 17 December 2016 in Brazil.)
Winnie and Wilbur plan a tea party with cupcakes, but their house needs to be cleaned.
2	"Winnie's Tricky Tights"	Leo Nielsen	Ema Čulík	25 December 2016
Winnie tears a hole in her tights.
