= Niel Bushnell =

English writer and artist

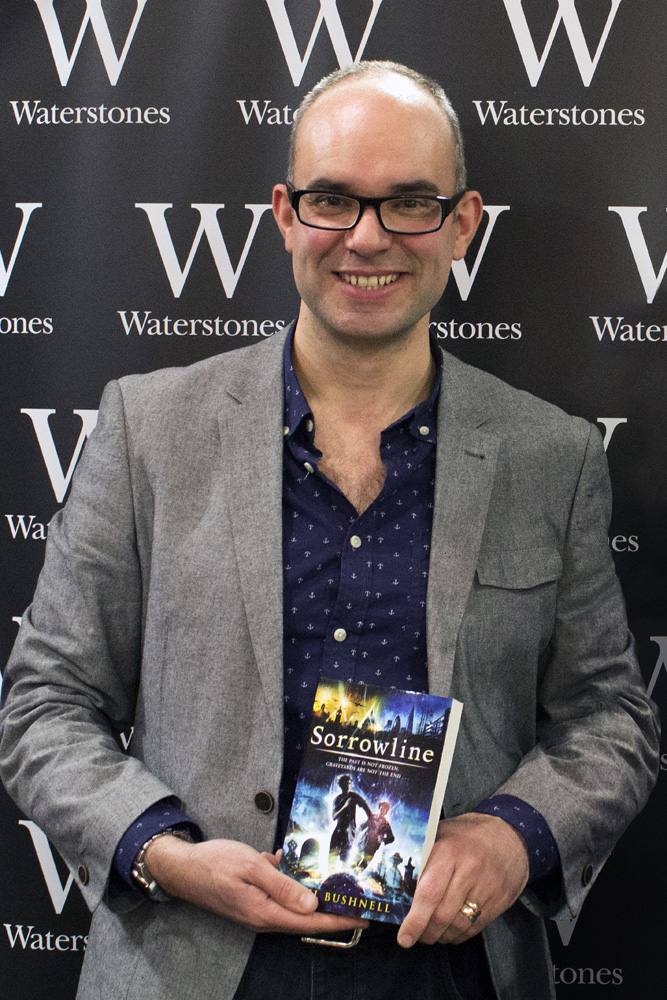
- Bushnell in January 2013
- Born: 1970 (age 55–56); Hartlepool, England
- Occupations: Novelist, Screenwriter & Illustrator
- Writing career
- Genres: Fantasy, Science fiction
- Notable works: Sorrowline, Timesmith
- Notable awards: Northern Promise Award; 2011
- Website: www.nielbushnell.com

Niel Bushnell (born 1970) is an English writer and artist from Hartlepool. He is the author of the science fiction series, The Arkship Saga, and children's fantasy novels Sorrowline and Timesmith, the first two books in The Timesmith Chronicles series, published in the UK by Andersen Press. He is the co-founder of animation studio Qurios Entertainment.

== Life and career ==
Niel Bushnell was born in Hartlepool, England. Bushnell collaborated with school friend, Gordon Fraser, to create the newspaper comic strip, The Funny Farm, later retitled Farmageddon. The strip ran for 18 months in the Hartlepool Mail, and was later reprinted in the Birmingham Mail. Bushnell later developed Farmageddon as an animated project.

=== Animation & illustration ===
An early interest in comics, notably Star Wars Weekly, encouraged Bushnell to draw and write his own comic strips. In 1990, working as Picturebox Publishing, Bushnell, again collaborating with Gordon Frazer, published and edited the small press comic anthology Over The Edge, which featured early work by Garen Ewing, Jez Hall and Paul H Birch, plus interviews with comic creators including Jeff Anderson and Will Simpson. In 1993 Bushnell contributed artwork to the Marvel UK comic The Incomplete Death's Head. Since 1994 Bushnell has worked as an animator. His credits include a variety of roles on feature films including Space Jam, Lost in Space and Felidae.

In 2002 Bushnell and his wife, Diane, established their own animation studio, Qurios Entertainment, in their home town of Hartlepool. As well as producing animation for commercials Qurios has a string of TV credits, including Hyperdrive, Spooks, Tracy Beaker Returns, and The Dumping Ground. Qurios later merged with Dene Films, a Newcastle upon Tyne based live action production company where Bushnell was Animation Director until 2013.

Bushnell was Co-Producer (with Chris Chapman) of two animated episodes of the Doctor Who story The Ice Warriors, which was released on DVD in August 2013. In 2018 Bushnell contributed new animation and visual effects to the Doctor Who story Revenge of the Cybermen for the season 12 blu-ray release. Since then, Bushnell has produced new animation, graphics and visual effects for the Season 14 story The Talons of Weng-Chiang, the Season 18 story Logopolis, Season 19's Castrovalva, and The Five Doctors for Season 20.

Bushnell was an Academic Tutor in Animation and Games Art at the University of Sunderland before joining The Northern School of Art in 2019 as the Programme Leader for Illustration for Commercial Application. He is currently the Cinematic Discipline Lead for Atomhawk Design.

=== Writing ===
Having written all his life, Bushnell began work in 2009 on what became his first novel, Sorrowline. Bushnell submitted the first 30 pages of Sorrowline into the 2011 Northern Writers Awards, an annual event organised New Writing North, a development agency for creative writing and creative reading based in the north east of England. Bushnell received a Northern Promise Award and Sorrowline was quickly picked up for publication by Andersen Press in the United Kingdom, Heyne in Germany and by Pensamento-Cultrix in Brazil. Sorrowline was one of twenty nine début novels for children long-listed for the Brandford Boase Award 2014.

In March 2017 Bushnell became the first Writer in Residence at The Word, the National Centre for the Written Word in South Shields.

Bushnell wrote and directed the live-action comedy short DCSS, a film made as part of Tees Valley Screen's Microshorts project, He has also written a Blake's 7 audio book for Big Finish Productions, released in November 2020, and several Doctor Who audiobooks.

=== Campaigning and Charitable work ===
In December 2015 Bushnell, along with Michael Chaplin (writer) and Ian McMillan (poet), was appointed to the Board of trustees of New Writing North. Bushnell is also a member of the Society of Authors and, in October 2016, was appointed Chair of the Authors North subgroup events committee. In 2019, he joined the Society of Authors Scriptwriters Group committee.

As well as supporting writing through his voluntary work with the Society of Authors and New Writing North, Bushnell has been involved in several projects to highlight and promote his hometown of Hartlepool and the north-east region of England. He has often campaigned to promote his home town of Hartlepool and, in 2003, was one of a small number of local businesses who joined to launch the Enterprising Hartlepool campaign, attending events and roadshows across the region. The campaign culminated in a visit to the Houses of Parliament and an opportunity to promote Hartlepool to MPs and national business leaders as a good place for business.

Bushnell was one of several north-east business owners who featured prominently in the Passionate People, Passionate Places campaign to promote the north-east of England. The campaign ran from 2005 for several years and featured promotional posters in train stations, London tube stations and in local and national press. In 2006, Bushnell lent his support to a campaign by Hartlepool businesses to get a direct rail link to London. In December 2007, Grand Central Railway began a daily service to the capital. In 2017, he joined the Tees Valley Digital Strategy Board to help to drive forward the Tees Valley's technology industries.

Bushnell has raised money for Cancer Research UK and the British Heart Foundation by participating in the Great North Run in 2007 and 2008, the Great Edinburgh Run in 2009 and the Great North 10k Run in 2009.

== Works ==
=== The Timesmith Chronicles ===
- Sorrowline (2013)
- Timesmith (2014)

=== The Arkship Saga ===
- Arkship Obsidian (2017)
- Arkship Vengeance (2017)
- Arkship Alliance (2018)
- Arkship Conquest (2018)
- Arkship Prophecy (2019)
- Arkship Encounters (2021) - a collection of short stories set before the events of Arkship Obsidian
- Arkship Omega (2022)

=== Doctor Who ===
- Doctor Who: The Ashes of Eternity (2021) 9th Doctor Audio Original for BBC Digital Audio
- Doctor Who: The Ice Kings (2023) 12th Doctor Audio Original for BBC Digital Audio
- Doctor Who: The Romanov Project (2023) 13th Doctor Audio Original for BBC Digital Audio
- Doctor Who: On Ghost Beach (2024) 15th Doctor Audio Original for BBC Digital Audio

=== The Tail of Tobin Artichoke ===
- Tobin Artichoke and the Asylum of Atlantis (2018) - short story
- Tobin Artichoke and the Queen of Heaven (2018)

=== Other works ===
- Altitude (2017)
- Blake's 7: Chosen (2020) audiobook produced by Big Finish Productions
- The Worlds of Blake's 7: Avalon Volume 02 (2021) Audio drama for Big Finish Productions
- The Death of Day (2024)

=== Short stories ===
- Scissors (2015) Commissioned by the National Literacy Trust
- Would Have, Could Have (2017) Commissioned as part of the WRITE Festival programme
- Follow That Ferry (2017) Commissioned as part of the WRITE Festival programme.

== Awards ==
- 2011 Northern Promise Award for Sorrowline, awarded at the Northern Writers' Awards.
- 2021 Europa Gold Award - Best Unproduced Screenplay for The Waiting Room, awarded at the L.A. Sci-Fi Film Awards.
