= National Non-Fiction Day =

National Non-Fiction November (NNFN) is an annual celebration of children's non-fiction in the UK.

National Non-Fiction November is the Federation of Children's Book Groups' annual celebration of anything factual. Born out of National Non-Fiction Day, the brain child of Adam Lancaster during his years as chair, the whole month now celebrates all those readers that have a passion for information and facts and attempts to bring non fiction celebrations in line with those of fiction.

The month is used by Federation Book Groups, libraries, schools, literacy organisations, book reviewers and parents to highlight the best information and narrative non-fiction books for children, and to show how it is not just fiction that can be read and enjoyed for pleasure.

In 2023 the theme is 'Wonderful Water'. The Federation of Children's Book Groups website https://fcbg.org.uk/nnfn/ carries details, resources and competitions to enable everyone in the UK to join in.
