= Pamela Butchart =

Scottish children's writer

- Born: Dundee, Scotland
- Education: University of Dundee; University of Edinburgh
- Occupations: Philosophy reader and children's author
- Writing career
- Years active: 2014–present
- Notable works: My Teacher is a Vampire Rat; The Spy Who Loved School Dinners
- Notable awards: 2016 Red House Children's Book Award; 2015 Blue Peter Book Award

Pamela Butchart is a Scottish children's author and high school philosophy teacher. Butchart is best known for her books, The Spy Who Loved School Dinners and My Head Teacher is a Vampire Rat, both of which won book awards.

== Education and career ==
Butchart has an MA in philosophy from the University of Dundee and a PGDE from the University of Edinburgh. After graduating, Butchart became a philosophy teacher at Harris Academy in Dundee.

She began writing children's books after her fiancé gave her a book on how to write for children. Butchart has said that Judith Kerr is one of her influences.

Butchart won the 2015 Blue Peter Book Award for Best story for her book, The Spy Who Loved School Dinners which was illustrated by Thomas Flintham.

In 2016, Butchart's book, My Teacher is a Vampire Rat won the Red House Children's Book Award in the Young Readers Category and for overall winner.

In 2017, it was announced that Butchart would write the sixteenth and seventeenth Secret Seven novels, the first additions to the series since 1963. The original series was written by Enid Blyton. The first book, called Mystery of the Skull, was published in July 2018 and the second, Mystery of the Theatre Ghost, was published in February 2019.

== Personal life ==
Butchart lives in Broughty Ferry, Dundee with her husband, Andy Cunningham, whom she married in July 2014.

== Bibliography ==
Pugly Series

- Pugly Bakes a Cake illustrated by Gemma Correll (2016) ISBN 9780857635990
- Pugly Solves a Crime (2016) ISBN 0857636766
- Pugly On Ice (2016) ISBN 0857638963

School detectives Series

- Baby Aliens Got My Teacher! illustrated by Thomas Flintham (2014) ISBN 9780857632371
- The Spy who loved School Dinners illustrated by Thomas Flintham (2014) ISBN 0857632574
- My Head Teacher is a Vampire Rat illustrated by Thomas Flintham (2015) ASIN B00S46UFHU
- Attack of the Demon Dinner Ladies illustrated by Thomas Flintham (2016) ISBN 0857636065
- To Wee or Not to Wee illustrated by Thomas Flintham (2016) ASIN B01EYGLXNI
- There's a Werewolf in My Tent! illustrated by Thomas Flintham (2017) ISBN 0857639064
- The Phantom Lollipop Man! illustrated by Thomas Flintham (2018) ASIN B077T32TZK
- There's a Yeti in the Playground! illustrated by Thomas Flintham (2018) ISBN 9781788001168
- Icarus Was Ridiculous illustrated by Thomas Flintham (2019) ISBN 9781788001205
- The Broken Leg of Doom illustrated by Thomas Flintham (2021) ISBN 9781788007870
- A Monster Ate My Packed Lunch! illustrated by Thomas Flintham (2021) ISBN 9781788009690
- There's a Beast in the Basement! illustrated by Thomas Flintham (2023) ISBN 9781839940514
- The Great Crisp Robbery illustrated by Thomas Flintham (2024) ISBN 9781839940538
- My Teacher is a Diamond Thief illustrated by Thomas Flintham (2025) ISBN 978-1-83994-055-2

Wigglesbottom Primary Series

- Wigglesbottom Primary:The Toilet Ghost illustrated by Becka Moor (2014) ISBN 0857634267
- Wigglesbottom Primary: The Shark in the Pool illustrated by Becka Moor (2015) ISBN 085763481X
- Wigglesbottom Primary: The Magic Hamster illustrated by Becka Moor (2016) ISBN 0857635301
- Wigglesbottom Primary: Super Dog! illustrated by Becka Moor (2017) ISBN 0857636758

Yikes Series

- Yikes, Stinkysaurus! (2014) ISBN 1408837064
- Yikes, Santasaurus! (2014) ISBN 1408851385
- Yikes, Ticklysaurus! illustrated by Sam Lloyd (2015) ASIN B00XN8UG5U
- Yikes, Santa-CLAWS! illustrated by Sam Lloyd (2015) ISBN 1408851377

Stand-alone books

- Petunia Perry and the Curse of the Ugly Pigeon (2015) ISBN 9780857634887
- Never Tickle a Tiger illustrated by Marc Boutavant (2016) ISBN 1408839032
- Charlie and the Christmas Factory (2024) ISBN 978-0241618776
