= Love Monster (TV series) =

- Genre: Children's television
- Based on: Love Monster series by Rachel Bright
- Developed by: Rachel Bright; Rob Jenkinson; Chapman Maddox; Sindy Boveda Spackman
- Directed by: Rufus Blacklock
- Voices of: Darren Foreman; George Takei; Javone Prince; Sarah Hadland; Lewis MacLeod; Freya Parker; Emma Maclennan
- Narrated by: Tamsin Greig
- Theme music composer: Jeremy Warmsley
- Composers: Esther Joy Lane; Hannah Charman
- Countries of origin: United Kingdom; Canada
- Original language: English
- No. of series: 2
- No. of episodes: 80

Production
- Executive producers: Tony Reed; Chapman Maddox; James Chen Gu
- Producers: Barry Quinn; Jamie Badminton; Katherine McQueen
- Editor: Andrew Ward
- Running time: 7 minutes
- Production companies: BBC Children's Productions; Boat Rocker Studios; UYoung; Karrot Animation; A Productions

Original release
- Network: CBeebies
- Release: 27 January 2020 – 1 September 2022

Love Monster is an animated children's television series that premiered on CBeebies on 27 January 2020. It is based on the books by Rachel Bright. It focuses on the misadventures of the titular monster and his friends. It premiered on 18 December 2020, on HBO Max as a Max Original in the United States and then one year later on Cartoon Network's Cartoonito block on 19 September 2021. It was removed in September 2022.

== Books by Rachel Bright ==
- Love Monster
- Love Monster and the Scary Something
- Love Monster and the Last Chocolate
- Love Monster and the Perfect Present
- Love Monster and the Extremely Big Wave

== Voice cast ==
- Darren Foreman as Love Monster
- Tamsin Greig as the Narrator
- Javone Prince as Bad Idea Puppy
- Sarah Hadland as Tiniest Fluffiest Bunny
- Lewis MacLeod as Elder Kitten and Dr. G. Piggles
- George Takei as Elder Panda
- Freya Parker as The In-Chicks and Delivery Duckling
- Emma Maclennan as Book Cub
- Jane Pickworth as Eager Beaver
- TBA as Elder Puppy
- TBA as Take My Time Tortoise
- TBA as Elder Mouse
- TBA as Elder Chick
- TBA as Elder Sheep
- TBA as Elder Bunny
- Tameka Empson as Good Idea Puppy

== Episodes ==
| Series | Episodes | Originally released | |
| Series | Episodes | First released | Last released |
|---|---|---|---|
| 1 | 54 | 27 January 2020 | 2020 |
| 2 | 26 | 2022 | 2022 |

=== Series 1 (2020) ===
| No. | Title | Written by | Original release date |
|---|---|---|---|
| 1 | "Sharing with Others Day" | Sindy Boveda Spackman | 27 January 2020 |
Love Monster gets a box of yummy chocolates! But should he share it?
| 2 | "Bouncy-Slidey Day" | Ian Carney | 28 January 2020 |
Love Monster must face his fear of the big slide in order to rescue Tiniest Fluffiest Bunny.
| 3 | "Three-Legged Race Day" | Tim Bain | 29 January 2020 |
Love Monster gets paired with Bad Idea Puppy in the three-legged race. But can they work together?
| 4 | "Show and Tell Day" | Sindy Boveda Spackman | 30 January 2020 |
Love Monster wants to show off his conch shell – but everyone else has unicorn-themed objects for the presentation!
| 5 | "Perfect Pineapple Party Day" | Stephanie Wahlstrom | 31 January 2020 |
Love Monster builds an amazing pineapple costume. But will he be able to play games?
| 6 | "Hot, Hot Day" | Denise Cassar | 3 February 2020 |
Love Monster breaks the fro-yo machine! What will happen now for tasty treats?
| 7 | "Accidental Elder Day" | Lucy Heavens | 4 February 2020 |
When he gets candyfloss on his face, everyone thinks Love Monster's an elder. But will he able to handle the responsibilities?
| 8 | "Paint a Picture Day" | Jo Clegg | 5 February 2020 |
Monster Teddy becomes an art model for everyone's paintings, but Love Monster misses him.
| 9 | "Yay for Rain Day" | Tim Bain | 6 February 2020 |
When the weather changes from sun to rain, and everyone's sad, Love Monster decides to ask his friends to do indoor activities outdoors!
| 10 | "Special Surprise Day" | James Hamilton | 7 February 2020 |
Can Love Monster resist opening Tiniest Fluffiest Bunny's present before night?
| 11 | "Clear Out Day" | Kristina Yee | 10 February 2020 |
An old disco ball creates a lot of problems.
| 12 | "Dancing Away Day" | Sophie Dutton | 11 February 2020 |
Tiniest Fluffiest Bunny's at a dance competition out of town. Love Monster misses her while she is away and worries that he didn't wish her good luck.
| 13 | "Picnic Night" | Philip Davies | 12 February 2020 |
A mysterious giant bunny makes problems for the night-time picnic.
| 14 | "Carrot Day" | Merrill Hagan | 13 February 2020 |
Tiniest Fluffiest Bunny is excited for Love Monster to try carrots, but it turns out he doesn't like them at all.
| 15 | "Give It Another Go Day" | Julia Prescott | 14 February 2020 |
Love Monster doesn't like the beach, but gives it another try by searching for something he can enjoy.
| 16 | "Elder Kitten Day" | Stephanie Wahlstrom | 6 April 2020 |
Love Monster has to keep Elder Kitten busy while everyone organises a surprise party.
| 17 | "Favourite Library Book Day" | Kristina Yee | 7 April 2020 |
Love Monster can't find his favourite book that he borrowed from Book Cub, so he and Tiniest Fluffiest Bunny play detective and retrace his steps to try and find it.
| 18 | "Happy to Help Day" | Ian Carney | 8 April 2020 |
Love Monster gets overwhelmed on Happy to Help Day after promising too much help!
| 19 | "Plant A Seed Day" | Raffaella Delle Donne | 9 April 2020 |
Love Monster tries lots of things to get his flower seeds to grow, but nothing happens.
| 20 | "Snowman Day" | Julia Kauffman | 10 April 2020 |
Love Monster builds a snowman called Tilty but worries when he begins to melt.
| 21 | "Treasure Hunt Day" | Sophie Dutton | 13 April 2020 |
Love Monster is really struggling to choose the perfect epic birthday present at the Everything But Sprinkles store for Bad Idea Puppy. In the end, he goes with his heart.
| 22 | "Choose One Thing Day" | Merrill Hagan | 14 April 2020 |
Love Monster struggles to find the perfect epic birthday present for Bad Idea Puppy.
| 23 | "Topsy Turvey Day" | Tim Bain | 15 April 2020 |
Love Monster finds it difficult when everyone has to do things the opposite way around.
| 24 | "Shooting Star Night" | Stephanie Wahlstrom | 16 April 2020 |
A group of fireflies accidentally spoil Love Monster's stargazing garden party.
| 25 | "Switch What You Do Day" | Lucy Heavens | 17 April 2020 |
It's Switch What You Do Day, so Love Monster and Delivery Duckling change roles.
| 26 | "Taking Turns Day" | James Hamilton | 20 April 2020 |
Love Monster has to pass the time in a queue as he waits for his turn to play a cool game.
| 27 | "Favourite Hat Day" | Annette Lynn & Julia Kauffman | 21 April 2020 |
Love Monster wants to wear his favourite hat on Favourite Hat Day, but it's falling apart!
| 28 | "Hot Chocolate Day" | Julia Claira Kauffman | 21 September 2020 |
Love Monster is chosen as sipping host for Hot Chocolate Day, but what does that mean?
| 29 | "Harvest Day" | Tim Bain | TBA |
Love Monster is judging a vegetable contest, but how can he pick the winner?
| 30 | "Kite Day" | Ellen Xie | TBA |
Love Monster gets in to a bit of trouble when he tries to fly the big dragon kite.
| 31 | "Sleepover Night" | Lucy Heavens | TBA |
Love Monster invites Tiniest Fluffiest Bunny for a sleepover in his garden.
| 32 | "Fluffytown Rocks Day" | Stephanie Wahlstrom | TBA |
Love Monster loses his lucky rock and worries that without it, he can't DJ.
| 33 | "Red Envelope Day" | Unknown | 28 September 2020 |
Love Monster accidentally sends Elder Kitten an empty envelope on Red Envelope Day.
| 34 | "Tidy Up Day" | Unknown | 29 September 2020 |
Love Monster helps Book Cub tidy up the forest, but he also takes a few souvenirs.
| 35 | "Ha Ha Ha Day" | Unknown | 30 September 2020 |
Love Monster has to help out Dr Piggles when he gets the hiccups on Ha Ha Ha Day.
| 36 | "Befriend a Bug Day" | Unknown | 1 October 2020 |
Love Monster makes friends with some caterpillars who love his beatboxing.
| 37 | "Frozen Fun Day" | Unknown | 2 October 2020 |
It's Frozen Fun Day, and Love Monster is having trouble learning to ice-skate. He asks Elder Kitten, who is much better at it, to teach him. Elder Kitten agrees to show him how and tells him that the trick is to get back up after falling. Despite falling over again and again, Love Monster gradually gets better - but how will he do in the big show?
| 38 | "Make Something Epic Day" | TBA | TBA |
Love Monster wants to create an epic fort for his friends, but he isn't quite sure how.
| 39 | "Do Something New Day" | TBA | TBA |
Love Monster needs to show Eager Beaver something new, but she's seen and done everything!
| 40 | "Challenge Yourself Day" | Rachel Bright | TBA |
Love Monster leads his friends on a mountain challenge, but they keep wandering off.
| 41 | "Super Sound Day" | Sophie Dutton | TBA |
Love Monster thinks he's missing out on having fun on a walk with Book Cub.
| 42 | "Lost Things Day" | Rachel Bright | TBA |
After helping Fluffytowners find their lost property at the Lost Things Office, Love Monster loses Monster Teddy and can't find him anywhere.
| 43 | "Frosty Frolics Day" | TBA | TBA |
Good Idea Puppy is in town for Frosty Frolics Day, but Bad Idea Puppy is feeling left out.
| 44 | "Day After Woo-Hoo Day Day" | Unknown | 18 December 2020 (US); 1 January 2021 (UK) |
Fluffy Town is in a mess after a big party and needs to be tidied up!
| 45 | "Invent Something New Day" | TBA | TBA |
Tiniest Fluffiest Bunny and Love Monster realise two heads are sometimes better than one.
| 46 | "Mooncake Day" | TBA | TBA |
Love Monster promises to make the biggest moon cake ever but keeps getting distracted.
| 47 | "Starring Role Day" | TBA | TBA |
Love Monster is directing a play. All his friends want a part and choosing is difficult.
| 48 | "Pool Party Day" | TBA | TBA |
A puncture in the paddling pool threatens to ruin Love Monster's pool party.
| 49 | "Spectacular Sparkly Night" | TBA | TBA |
Love Monster tries to face his fear of loud bangs so he can enjoy the fireworks display.
| 50 | "In a Spin Day" | TBA | TBA |
Bad Idea Puppy wants Love Monster to teach him to DJ, but he's not the best pupil.
| 51 | "Dress Up Day" | TBA | TBA |
Love Monster is dressed up as a superhero, but maybe his fun is ruining everyone else's.
| 52 | "Very Dark Night" | TBA | TBA |
It's night-time, and Love Monster hears unexplained noises in his house.
| 53 | "Super Fun Day" | TBA | TBA |
Why is Love Monster finding it so difficult to have super-fun on Super-Fun Day?
| 54 | "Movie Night" | TBA | TBA |
Movie Night turns into an incredible adventure for Love Monster and friends!

=== Series 2 (2022) ===
| No. | Title | Written by | Original release date |
|---|---|---|---|
| 1 | "A Very Merry Unicorn Day" | TBA | TBA |
Love Monster accidentally snows everyone in on Unicorn Day.
| 2 | "Jam Session Day" | TBA | TBA |
Love Monster and Bad Idea Puppy get locked in his bathroom.
| 3 | "Camping Buddy Day" | TBA | TBA |
Love Monster goes camping with Delivery Duckling, but things keep going wrong for him.
| 4 | "Splash About Day" | TBA | TBA |
Love Monster is excited to be an assistant lifeguard for the day.
| 5 | "Happy Healthy Day" | TBA | TBA |
Love Monster feigns illness, but the fibbing makes him feel ill for real.
| 6 | "Super Rainbow Day" | TBA | TBA |
Love Monster searches for the magic sparkle dust at the end of the rainbow.
| 7 | "Siesta Fiesta Day" | TBA | TBA |
Love Monster is frustrated when he can't get to sleep on Siesta Fiesta Day.
| 8 | "Makeover Day" | TBA | TBA |
Love Monster and his friends redecorate Elder Kitten's living room, but not in his style.
| 9 | "Woodworking Day" | TBA | TBA |
Love Monster crafts a special toy plane for himself, but he is worried about sharing it.
| 10 | "Fluffytown Swap Day" | TBA | TBA |
Love Monster has a clear-out for a bring-and-swap event but can't let his old things go.
| 11 | "Take a Treat Day" | TBA | TBA |
Bad Idea Puppy tries to beat the speed record for treat-taking but hoovers them up instead.
| 12 | "Moving Day" | TBA | TBA |
Bad Idea Puppy mishears that Take My Time Tortoise is moving and spreads the false news.
| 13 | "Party All Day Day" | TBA | TBA |
Love Monster wants to do everything on Party All Day Day, but he starts to feel tired.
| 14 | "Babysitting Day" | TBA | TBA |
Love Monster looks after a baby koala and finds it hard work.
| 15 | "Sparkle and Shine Day" | TBA | TBA |
Love Monster trades in his old scooter for a shiny new one, but he soon misses it.
| 16 | "Breakfast for Dinner Day" | TBA | TBA |
Love Monster has planned the perfect dinner for his friends, but things start to go wrong.
| 17 | "Extreme Snowy Sports Day" | TBA | TBA |
Love Monster has to rescue Monster Teddy when he falls from a ski lift on Mount Fluffaroo.
| 18 | "Be A Brave Bunny Day" | TBA | TBA |
Love Monster creates a dance for Tiniest Fluffiest Bunny's birthday but gets nervous.
| 19 | "What's Going On Day" | TBA | TBA |
Love Monster doesn't know what day they are celebrating in Fluffytown today.
| 20 | "Make A Plan Day" | TBA | TBA |
Love Monster and Elder Panda lose each other in the Everything but Sprinkles Store.
| 21 | "Magic Show Day" | TBA | TBA |
Love Monster hogs the limelight at a magic show by performing three tricks instead of one.
| 22 | "Treat Your Friends Day" | TBA | TBA |
Love Monster treats his friends to a spa day but wants them to relax quicker.
| 23 | "Lost Parcel Day" | TBA | TBA |
Love Monster and Delivery Duckling try to deliver a lost parcel - but who is it for?
| 24 | "Elders Away Day" | TBA | TBA |
Eager Beaver is left in charge of Fluffytown for the day and bosses everyone around.
| 25 | "The Big Bean Bash Day" | TBA | TBA |
Love Monster is jealous of the attention Tiniest Fluffiest Bunny gets at a sports event.
| 26 | "Road Trip Day" | TBA | TBA |
Love Monster and Tiniest Fluffiest Bunny take a trip out of Fluffytown in the carrot car.
