= Rachel Bright (author) =

English author and illustrator

- Born: Rachel Bright
- Notable work: Love Monster, The Lion Inside, The Koala Who Could, Peter Rabbit Head Over Tail
- Website: www.rachelbrightbooks.co.uk

Rachel Bright is an English author and illustrator who resides in Dorset with her partner and two daughters.

== Early life and education ==
Bright grew up in Edgmond, Shropshire. She attended New College, Telford where she concentrated on art; she later trained in graphics at Kingston University. Bright also received a Masters Degree in Printmaking at the University of the West of England, Bristol.

== Career ==
After completing her education at Kingston, Bright took on a job as a junior designer at stationers Smythson. She briefly worked as an air hostess with Virgin Atlantic before leaving to focus on her art career.

Bright has written and illustrated 24 published books, including the children’s picture book series Love Monster. In 2020 the series was adapted for television as an animated children's show. Bright has written two episodes for the series, "Challenge Yourself Day" and "Lost Things Day".

Bright is the author of The Lion Inside series (illustrated by Jim Field) and the Dino Feelings series (illustrated by Chris Chatterton).

Her books have sold well over 3 million copies and been translated into over 40 languages.

In 2021 Bright published Peter Rabbit Head Over Tail, inspired by Beatrix Potter's character Peter Rabbit, with illustrations by Nicola Kinnear. It was followed by Peter Rabbit Hide and Seek in 2022, and Peter Rabbit Up and Away in 2024.

== Bibliography ==
=== Author ===
- The Lion Inside - illustrated by Jim Field
- The Koala Who Could - illustrated by Jim Field
- The Squirrels Who Squabbled - illustrated by Jim Field
- The Way Home for Wolf - illustrated by Jim Field
- The Whale Who Wanted More - illustrated by Jim Field
- The Gecko and the Echo - illustrated by Jim Field
- The Pandas Who Promised - illustrated by Jim Field
- The Camel Who Had the Hump - illustrated by Jim Field
- The Turtle Who Turned the Tide - illustrated by Jim Field
- The Worrysaurus - illustrated by Chris Chatterton
- The Stompysaurus - illustrated by Chris Chatterton
- The Hugasaurus - illustrated by Chris Chatterton
- The Wobblysaurus - illustrated by Chris Chatterton
- Slug in Love - illustrated by Nadia Shireen
- Snail in Space - illustrated by Nadia Shireen
- FreeRange Freddy - illustrated by Izzy Evans
- Side by Side - illustrated by Debbie Gliori
- Snowflake in my Pocket - illustrated by Yu Rong
- Peter Rabbit Head Over Tail - illustrated by Nicola Kinnear
- Peter Rabbit Hide and Seek - illustrated by Nicola Kinnear
- Peter Rabbit Up and Away - illustrated by Nicola Kinnear

=== Author and illustrator ===
- Love Monster
- Love Monster and the Last Chocolate
- Love Monster and the Scary Something
- Love Monster and the Perfect Present
- Love Monster and the Extremely Big Wave
- Walter & the No-need-to Worry Suit
- Benjamin & the Super Spectacles
- All I Want For Christmas
- My Sister Is An Alien
- Mine
- Amazing Daddy
- When I’m Bigger Mama Bear
- In A Minute, Mama Bear
- Love You Hoo

== Awards ==
- World Book Day illustrator (2013)
- Writer for the Carmelite prize (2016)
- Oscar’s Book Prize (2017, won - The Koala Who Could)
- Nottingham Children’s Book Award - (won - My Sister is an Alien )
- Laugh Out Loud Book Awards (The Lollies) (2024, won - The Gecko and the Echo)
