= Chris Chapman (producer) =

Chris Chapman (born June 15, 1981) is an English television producer, director, and writer, best known for his documentary Stammer School, as well as producing and directing Doctor Who documentaries, and factual series including CBBC's Our School, BBC1's Countryfile and Fantastic Beasts: A Natural History with Stephen Fry. He is also a writer of Doctor Who audio dramas for Big Finish.

== Career ==
In 2005, whilst still studying at Newcastle University, Chapman was hired as a junior researcher at Granada Factual North. His first project was Channel 4's 'The 100 Greatest Family Films'.

In 2007, with the closure of Granada's Newcastle base, Chapman took up the role of assistant producer with Dene Films. His script work on short film The Conkerers earned him a Royal Television Society Award. Chapman was promoted to producerdDirector in 2008, and directed Meningitis Matters for Newcastle University. Chapman was awarded 'Best Newcomer' by the RTS, and went on to write and produce the films Ghost Street, Help Yourself and Edge of Empire: The Eagle's Eye. Chapman directed the film, Stammer School in 2010, featuring Michael Palin, which earned a Children's BAFTA nomination for Best Factual. He followed this with The Last Cast for BBC1 and I Am Ethan for CBBC. Chapman won the RTS production craft award in 2013, the same year that he decided to leave Dene Films and go freelance.

During his time at Dene Films, Chapman started making documentaries for the Doctor Who DVD range. Between 2009 and 2014, nearly 40 of Chapman's productions were released, including Looking for Peter, presented by Toby Hadoke - as well as the follow-up films Living with Levene and Hadoke Vs HAVOC. Along with Niel Bushnell, Chapman produced the animated reconstructions of The Ice Warriors episodes 2 and 3 for their DVD release, and appears on the making-of documentary that accompanies them.

Chapman left Dene Films and turned freelance in 2013. His first project was One Way Ticket for CBBC, followed by mini-series The Duke & I for ITV1. Chapman then worked as a producer-director for the 15-part CBBC series Our School. Chapman's other work during this time included the BBC1 series Paul O'Grady: The Sally Army & Me, Sky Living's Who'd Be a Billionaire, ITV1's What Would Be Your Miracle? and BBC3's Doctor Who: The Afterparty.

In February 2016, Chapman was commissioned by Big Finish to write the Doctor Who story 'The Memory Bank' for their release 'The Memory Bank & Other Stories' The story was recorded on Wednesday 27 April, and released in October 2016. In January 2017, Chapman was commissioned to write the four-part Doctor Who story The Middle starring Colin Baker's 6th Doctor. The story was recorded in June and released in November 2017. In August 2017, Chapman was commissioned to write the four-part Doctor Who story 'Iron Bright', starring Colin Baker, for release in June 2018. In December 2017, Chapman was commissioned to write the 2-part UNIT story Hosts of the Wirrn for the Revisitations box set.

In 2018 and 2019, Chapman completed several stints with the Development team at the BBC's Natural History Unit in Bristol. From 2019, Chapman became a regular director with BBC1's Countryfile. In 2021, Chapman was one of the directors on the BBC2 series Our Wild Adventures. In 2021, Chapman directed the BBC1 documentary Fantastic Beasts: A Natural History presented by Stephen Fry.

In May 2018, it was announced that Chapman would produce new documentary content for the BBC's Doctor Who blu-ray box set releases under the banner of his own company, Moon Balloon Productions.

Chapman wrote the Big Finish Tom Baker story 'The Friendly Invasion' which was released in 2023. That year also saw the release of 'Dark Season: Legacy Rising', which included Chapman's story 'Summer'.
