= Jim Field (illustrator) =

English illustrator (born 1980)

- Born: James Field; October 1980 (age 45); London, England
- Notable work: Oi Frog, The Lion Inside, The Christmas Pig
- Website: www.jimfield.me

James Field (born October 1980) is a British illustrator from London, who now lives in Paris with his wife and daughter.

== Early life ==
Field studied animation at Hull School of Art and Design, graduated in 2002, paving his way into the animation industry working as a director for Partizan in London.

== Career ==
Field is the illustrator of picture book series Oi Frog written by Kes Gray, which was made into a West End show in 2020. Field also illustrated The Lion Inside, written by Rachel Bright (author).

In 2021, Field illustrated The Christmas Pig written by J K Rowling.

== Awards ==
Booktrust Roald Dahl Funny Prize (2011, won - Cats Ahoy)

Laugh Out Loud book awards (The Lollies) (2016, won - The Parent Agency)

Oscar's Book Prize (2017, won - The Koala Who Could)

Sainsbury's Children's Book Awards (2020, won - Oi See it! Say It)

Laugh Out Loud book awards (The Lollies) (2024, won - The Gecko and the Echo)
