= Waterstones Children's Book Prize =

Annual award given to a work of children's literature

The Waterstone Children's Book Prize
- Awarded for: to uncover hidden talent in children's writing
- Date: 21 March 2023
- Country: United Kingdom
- Presented by: Waterstones
- Formerly called: Ottakar's Children's Book Prize
- First award: 2005; 21 years ago
- Website: www.waterstones.com/the-waterstones-childrens-book-prize

The Waterstones Children's Book Prize is an annual award given to a work of children's literature published during the previous year. First awarded in 2005, the purpose of the prize is "to uncover hidden talent in children's writing" and is therefore open only to authors who have published no more than two or three books, depending on which category they are in. The prize is awarded by British book retailer Waterstones.

It was originally called the Ottakar's Children's Book Prize, after the bookshop chain. When all Ottakar's stores were rebranded as Waterstone's following the HMV Group takeover in 2006, the prize also changed its name to become the Waterstone's Children's Book Prize.

Beginning in 2012, the prize was divided into three categories: Picture Books, Fiction 5–12, and Teen. Each category winner receives £2,000 with an overall winner chosen from the three getting an additional £3,000 (thus the overall winner receives £5,000 in total).

In 2016 the categories were renamed: Picture Books became Illustrated Books, Fiction 5–12 became Younger Fiction and the Teen category became Older Fiction.

== Nominations and winners ==
=== 2005 ===
Category	Author	Title	Result	Ref.
Best Book	Stuart Hill	The Cry of the Icemark	Winner	
Best Book	M. I. McAllister	Urchin of the Riding Stars	Finalist	
Best Book	Barry Jonsberg	The Whole Business with Kiffo and the Pitbull	Finalist	
Best Book	Livi Michael	The Whispering Road	Finalist	
Best Book	Val Tyler	The Time Wreccas	Finalist	
Best Book	Julie Hearn	The Merrybegot	Finalist	
Best Book	Shannon Hale	The Goose Girl	Finalist	
Best Book	Ann Halam	Siberia	Finalist	
Best Book	Ellen Potter	Olivia Kidney	Finalist	
Best Book	Kes Gray	Nelly the Monster Sitter	Finalist	
Best Book	Bowering Sivers	Jammy Dodgers on the Run	Finalist	
Best Book	Kenneth Oppel	Airborn	Finalist	

=== 2006 ===
Category	Author	Title	Result	Ref.
Best Book	Julia Golding	The Diamond of Drury Lane	Winner	
Best Book	Michael Carroll	The Quantum Prophecy	Finalist	
Best Book	Beth Goobie	The Lottery	Finalist	
Best Book	John Boyne	The Boy in the Striped Pyjamas	Finalist	
Best Book	Heather Vogel Frederick	Spymice	Finalist	
Best Book	Elise Broach	Shakespeare's Secret	Finalist	
Best Book	Adam Frost	Ralph the Magic Rabbit	Finalist	
Best Book	Edith Pattou	North Child	Finalist	
Best Book	John Dougherty	Jack Slater, Monster Investigator	Finalist	
Best Book	Suzanne Collins	Gregor and the Rats of Underland	Finalist	

=== 2007 ===
Category	Author	Title	Result	Ref.
Best Book	Tom Becker	Darkside	Winner	
Best Book	Tom Kelly	The Thing with Finn	Finalist	
Best Book	Gareth P. Jones	The Case of the Missing Cats	Finalist	
Best Book	F. E. Higgins	The Black Book of Secrets	Finalist	
Best Book	Christopher Russell	Smugglers	Finalist	
Best Book	Philip Caveney	Sebastian Darke	Finalist	
Best Book	L. Brittney	Nathan Fox: Dangerous Times	Finalist	
Best Book	Michael Broad	Jake Cake: The Werewolf Teacher	Finalist	
Best Book	J. A. Henderson	Bunker 10	Finalist	
Best Book	Siobhan Dowd	A Swift Pure Cry	Finalist	

=== 2008 ===
Category	Author	Title	Result	Ref.
Best Book	Sally Nicholls	Ways to Live Forever	Winner	
Best Book	Emily Bearn	Tumtum and Nutmeg	Finalist	
Best Book	Sam Enthoven	TIM Defender of the Earth	Finalist	
Best Book	David Melling	Stone Goblins	Finalist	
Best Book	Matt Haig	Shadow Forest	Finalist	
Best Book	Jenny Valentine	Broken Soup	Finalist	
Best Book	Gabrielle Halberstam	Blue Sky Freedom	Finalist	
Best Book	Marie-Louise Jensen	Between Two Seas	Finalist	
Best Book	Oisín McGann	Ancient Appetites	Finalist	

=== 2009 ===
Category	Author	Title	Result	Ref.
Best Book	Michelle Harrison	13 Treasures	Winner	
Best Book	Elen Caldecott	How Kirsty Jenkins Stole the Elephant	Finalist	
Best Book	Vanessa Curtis	Zelah Green Queen of Clean	Finalist	
Best Book	Steve Feasey	Changeling	Finalist	
Best Book	Ceci Jenkinson	Gnomes Are Forever	Finalist	
Best Book	Marie-Louise Jensen	The Lady in the Tower	Finalist	
Best Book	Rob Stevens	Mapmaker's Monsters	Finalist	
Best Book	Rachel Ward	Numbers	Finalist	

=== 2010 ===
Category	Author	Title	Result	Ref.
Best Book	Katie Davies	The Great Hamster Massacre	Winner	
Best Book	Jeremy De Quidt	The Toymaker	Finalist	
Best Book	Caro King	The Seven Sorcerers	Finalist	
Best Book	Victoria Forester	The Girl Who Could Fly	Finalist	
Best Book	Pat Walsh	The Crowfield Curse	Finalist	
Best Book	A. G. Taylor	Meteorite Strike	Finalist	
Best Book	Suzanne Lafleur	Love, Aubrey	Finalist	
Best Book	Lucy Christopher	Flyaway	Finalist	
Best Book	Laura Summers	Desperate Measures	Finalist	

=== 2011 ===
Category	Author	Title	Result	Ref.
Best Book	Sita Brahmachari	Artichoke Hearts	Winner	
Best Book	Ruth Eastham	The Memory Cage	Finalist	
Best Book	Candy Gourlay	Tall Story	Finalist	
Best Book	Janice Hardy	The Pain Merchants	Finalist	
Best Book	Curtis Jobling	Wereworld: The Rise of the Wolf	Finalist	
Best Book	Anna Kemp	Fantastic Frankie and the Brain-Drain Machine	Finalist	
Best Book	Irfan Master	A Beautiful Lie	Finalist	
Best Book	Jon Mayhew	Mortlock	Finalist	
Best Book	Rebecca Stead	When You Reach Me	Finalist	

=== 2012 ===
Category	Author	Title	Result	Ref.
OVERALL	Jonny Duddle	The Pirates Next Door	Winner	
Fiction 5-12	Liz Pichon	The Brilliant World of Tom Gates	Category winner	
Fiction 5-12	Mackenzie Crook	The Windvale Sprites	Finalist	
Fiction 5-12	Janet Foxley	Muncle Trogg	Finalist	
Fiction 5-12	Gill Lewis	Sky Hawk	Finalist	
Fiction 5-12	Alan Silberberg	Milo and the Restart Button	Finalist	
Fiction 5-12	Alex T. Smith	Claude in the City	Finalist	
Picture Book	Jonny Duddle	The Pirates Next Door	Category winner	
Picture Book	Marta Altés	No!	Finalist	
Picture Book	Jon Klassen	I Want My Hat Back	Finalist	
Picture Book	Ann Bonwill and Simon Rickerty	I Don't Want to be a Pea!	Finalist	
Picture Book	Nadia Shireen	Good Little Wolf	Finalist	
Picture Book	Chris Haughton	A Bit Lost	Finalist	
Teen	Jenny Downham	You Against Me	Category winner	
Teen	Annabel Pitcher	My Sister Lives on the Mantelpiece	Finalist	
Teen	Veronica Roth	Divergent	Finalist	
Teen	Ruta Sepetys	Between Shades of Gray	Finalist	
Teen	Phil Earle	Being Billy	Finalist	
Teen	Morgan Matson	Amy and Roger's Epic Detour	Finalist	

=== 2013 ===
Category	Author	Title	Result	Ref.
OVERALL	Annabel Pitcher	Ketchup Clouds	Winner	
Fiction 5-12	R. J. Palacio	Wonder	Category winner	
Fiction 5-12	Catherine Constable	The Wolf Princess	Finalist	
Fiction 5-12	Jennifer Gray	Atticus Claw Breaks the Law	Finalist	
Fiction 5-12	Helen Peters	The Secret Hen House Theatre	Finalist	
Fiction 5-12	Geoff Rodkey	Chronicles of Egg: Deadweather and Sunrise	Finalist	
Fiction 5-12	Jim Smith	Barry Loser: I Am Not a Loser	Finalist	
Picture Book	Rebecca Cobb	Lunchtime	Category winner	
Picture Book	Jo Empson	Rabbityness	Finalist	
Picture Book	Chris Haughton	Oh No, George!	Finalist	
Picture Book	Anna Kemp	The Worst Princess	Finalist	
Picture Book	Frann Preston-Gannon	The Journey Home	Finalist	
Picture Book	Sam Usher	Can You See Sassoon?	Finalist	
Teen	Annabel Pitcher	Ketchup Clouds	Category winner	
Teen	Rachel Hartman	Seraphina	Finalist	
Teen	Laura Jarratt	Skin Deep	Finalist	
Teen	S. J. Kincaid	Insignia	Finalist	
Teen	Sarah J. Maas	Throne of Glass	Finalist	
Teen	Andy Robb	Geekhood: Close Encounters of the Girl Kind	Finalist	

=== 2014 (10th anniversary) ===
Category	Author	Title	Result	Ref.
OVERALL	Katherine Rundell	Rooftoppers	Winner	
Fiction 5–12	Katherine Rundell	Rooftoppers	Category winner	
Fiction 5–12	Soman Chainani	The School for Good and Evil	Finalist	
Fiction 5–12	Piers Torday	The Last Wild	Finalist	
Fiction 5–12	Sandra Greaves	Skull in the Wood	Finalist	
Fiction 5–12	Emerald Fennell	Shiverton Hall	Finalist	
Fiction 5–12	Laura Dockrill	Darcy Durdock	Finalist	
Picture Book	Nicola O'Byrne	Open Very Carefully	Category winner	
Picture Book	Elys Dolan	Weasels	Finalist	
Picture Book	Yasmeen Ismail	Time for Bed, Fred	Finalist	
Picture Book	Gemma Merino	The Crocodile Who Didn't Like Water	Finalist	
Picture Book	Helen Hancocks	Penguin in Peril	Finalist	
Picture Book	Courtney Dicmas	Harold Finds a Voice	Finalist	
Teen	Holly Smale	Geek Girl	Category winner	
Teen	Alexia Casale	The Bone Dragon	Finalist	
Teen	Dawn O'Porter	Paper Aeroplanes	Finalist	
Teen	Ruta Sepetys	Out of the Easy	Finalist	
Teen	Emily Murdoch	If You Find Me	Finalist	
Teen	Erin Lange	Butter	Finalist	

=== 2015 ===
Category	Author	Title	Result	Ref.
OVERALL	Rob Biddulph	Blown Away	Winner	
Fiction 5-12	Robin Stevens	Murder Most Unladylike	Category winner	
Fiction 5-12	Harriet Whitehorn with Beck Moor (illustrator)	Violet and the Pearl of the Orient	Finalist	
Fiction 5-12	Anne Booth	Girl with a White Dog	Finalist	
Fiction 5-12	GR Gemin	Cowgirl	Finalist	
Fiction 5-12	Polly Ho-Yen	Boy in the Tower	Finalist	
Fiction 5-12	Lara Williamson	A Boy Called Hope	Finalist	
Picture Book	Rob Biddulph	Blown Away	Category winner	
Picture Book	Sophy Henn	Where Bear?	Finalist	
Picture Book	Victoria Turnbull	The Sea Tiger	Finalist	
Picture Book	Steve Antony	The Queen's Hat	Finalist	
Picture Book	Suzanne Barton	The Dawn Chorus	Finalist	
Picture Book	Lucy Letherland	Atlas of Adventures	Finalist	
Teen	Sally Green	Half Bad	Category winner	
Teen	Leslye Walton	The Strange and Beautiful Sorrows of Ava Lavender	Finalist	
Teen	Sarah Moore Fitzgerald	The Apple Tart of Hope	Finalist	
Teen	Kim Skater	Smart	Finalist	
Teen	Louise O'Neill	Only Ever Yours	Finalist	
Teen	Erin Lange	Dead Ends	Finalist	

=== 2016 ===
Category	Author	Title	Result	Ref.
OVERALL	David Solomon	My Brother Is a Superhero	Winner	
Illustrated Book	David Litchfield	The Bear and the Piano	Category winner	
Illustrated Book	Naomi Howarth	The Crow's Tale	Finalist	
Illustrated Book	Matty Long	Super Happy Magic Forest	Finalist	
Illustrated Book	Nicholas John Frith	Hector and Hummingbird	Finalist	
Illustrated Book	David Barrow	Have You Seen Elephant?	Finalist	
Illustrated Book	Lorraine Carey and Migy Blanco	Cinderella's Sister and the Big Bad Wolf	Finalist	
Older Fiction	Lisa Williamson	The Art of Being Normal	Category winner	
Older Fiction	Melinda Salisbury	The Sin Eater's Daughter	Finalist	
Older Fiction	Moïra Fowley-Doyle	The Accident Season	Finalist	
Older Fiction	Lisa Heathfield	Seed	Finalist	
Older Fiction	Jandy Nelson	I'll Give You the Sun	Finalist	
Older Fiction	Leo Hunt	13 Days of Midnight	Finalist	
Younger Fiction	David Solomon	My Brother Is a Superhero	Category winner	
Younger Fiction	Sibéal Pounder	Witch Wars	Finalist	
Younger Fiction	Katherine Woodfine	The Mystery of the Clockwork Sparrow	Finalist	
Younger Fiction	Kevin Sands	The Blackthorn Key	Finalist	
Younger Fiction	Shane Hegarty	Darkmouth	Finalist	
Younger Fiction	Crystal Chan	Bird	Finalist	

=== 2017 ===
Category	Author	Title	Result	Ref.
OVERALL	Kiran Millwood Hargrave	The Girl of Ink and Stars	Winner	
Illustrated Book	Lizzy Stewart	There's a Tiger in the Garden	Category winner	
Illustrated Book	Fabi Santiago	Tiger in a Tutu	Finalist	
Illustrated Book	Francesca Sanna	The Journey	Finalist	
Illustrated Book	Duncan Beedie	The Bear Who Stared	Finalist	
Illustrated Book	Matt Robertson	Super Stan	Finalist	
Illustrated Book	Meg McLaren	Life Is Magic	Finalist	
Older Fiction	Patrice Lawrence	Orangeboy	Category winner	
Older Fiction	Nilanjana Roy	The Wildings	Finalist	
Older Fiction	Nicola Yoon	The Sun Is Also a Star	Finalist	
Older Fiction	Lisa Heathfield	Paper Butterflies	Finalist	
Older Fiction	Lindsay Eagar	Hour of the Bees	Finalist	
Older Fiction	Gavriel Savit	Anna and the Swallow Man	Finalist	
Younger Fiction	Kiran Millwood Hargrave	The Girl of Ink and Stars	Category winner	
Younger Fiction	Lauren Wolk	Wolf Hollow	Finalist	
Younger Fiction	Ross Welford	Time Travelling with a Hamster	Finalist	
Younger Fiction	Peter Bunzl	Cogheart	Finalist	
Younger Fiction	Laura James	Captain Pug	Finalist	
Younger Fiction	MG Leonard	Beetle Boy	Finalist	

=== 2018 ===
Category	Author	Title	Result	Ref.
OVERALL	Angie Thomas	The Hate U Give	Winner	
Illustrated Book	Joe Todd-Stanton	The Secret of Black Rock	Category winner	
Illustrated Book	Louise Greig	The Night Box	Finalist	
Illustrated Book	Matt Carr	Superbat	Finalist	
Illustrated Book	Sandra Dieckmann	Leaf	Finalist	
Illustrated Book	Simon Philip	I Really Want the Cake	Finalist	
Illustrated Book	Robert Starling	Fergal Is Fuming!	Finalist	
Older Fiction	Angie Thomas	The Hate U Give	Category winner	
Older Fiction	Catherine Barter	Troublemakers	Finalist	
Older Fiction	Pam Smy	Thornhill	Finalist	
Older Fiction	Emily Suvada	This Mortal Coil	Finalist	
Older Fiction	Emily Bain Murphy	The Disappearances	Finalist	
Older Fiction	Alice Broadway	Ink	Finalist	
Younger Fiction	Jessica Townsend	Nevermoor: The Trials of Morrigan Crow	Category winner	
Younger Fiction	Maz Evans	Who Let the Gods Out?	Finalist	
Younger Fiction	Kieran Larwood	The Legend of Podkin One-Ear	Finalist	
Younger Fiction	Lisa Thompson	The Goldfish Boy	Finalist	
Younger Fiction	Greg James and Chris Smith	Kid Normal	Finalist	
Younger Fiction	Helena Duggan	A Place Called Perfect	Finalist	

=== 2019 ===
Category	Author	Title	Result	Ref.
OVERALL	Onjali Q. Raúf	The Boy at the Back of the Class	Winner	
Illustrated Book	Lauren Ace and Jenny Løvlie	The Girl	Category winner	
Illustrated Book	Emily Haworth-Booth	The King Who Banned the Dark	Finalist	
Illustrated Book	John Bond	Mini Rabbit Not Lost	Finalist	
Illustrated Book	Vashti Harrison	Little Leaders: Bold Women in Black History	Finalist	
Illustrated Book	Jessica Love	Julián Is a Mermaid	Finalist	
Illustrated Book	Michael Whaite	100 Dogs	Finalist	
Older Fiction	Tomi Adeyemi	Children of Blood and Bone	Category winner	
Older Fiction	Tracy Darnton	The Truth About Lies	Finalist	
Older Fiction	Elizabeth Acevedo	The Poet X	Finalist	
Older Fiction	Malcolm Duffy	Me Mam. Me Dad. Me.	Finalist	
Older Fiction	Ele Fountain	Boy 87	Finalist	
Older Fiction	Christelle Dabos	A Winter's Promise	Finalist	
Younger Fiction	Onjali Q. Raúf	The Boy at the Back of the Class	Category winner	
Younger Fiction	P.G. Bell	The Train to Impossible Places	Finalist	
Younger Fiction	Ewa Jozefkowicz	The Mystery of the Colour Thief	Finalist	
Younger Fiction	Sophie Anderson	The House with Chicken Legs	Finalist	
Younger Fiction	Andy Shepherd	The Boy Who Grew Dragons	Finalist	
Younger Fiction	Vashti Hardy	Brightstorm: A Sky-Ship Adventure	Finalist	

=== 2020 ===
Category	Author	Title	Result	Ref.
OVERALL	Nathan Bryon	Look Up!	Winner	
Illustrated Book	Nathan Bryon	Look Up!	Category winner	
Illustrated Book	Graham Carter	Otto Blotter, Bird Spotter	Finalist	
Illustrated Book	Kate Read	One Fox	Finalist	
Illustrated Book	Beatrice Blue	Once Upon a Unicorn Horn	Finalist	
Illustrated Book	Rose Robbins	Me and My Sister	Finalist	
Illustrated Book	Ben Rothery	Hidden Planet	Finalist	
Older Fiction	Liz Hyder	Bearmouth	Category winner	
Older Fiction	Emma Smith-Barton	The Million Pieces of Neena Gill	Finalist	
Older Fiction	Tamsin Winter	Jemima Small Versus the Universe	Finalist	
Older Fiction	Samira Ahmed	Internment	Finalist	
Older Fiction	gal-dem	I Will Not Be Erased: Our Stories About Growing Up as People of Colour	Finalist	
Older Fiction	Holly Jackson	A Good Girl's Guide to Murder	Finalist	
Younger Fiction	Sharna Jackson	High-Rise Mystery	Category winner	
Younger Fiction	Kirsty Applebaum	The Middler	Finalist	
Younger Fiction	Meg Grehan	The Deepest Breath	Finalist	
Younger Fiction	Lucy Strange	Our Castle, the Sea	Finalist	
Younger Fiction	Sam Copeland	Charlie Changes into a Chicken	Finalist	
Younger Fiction	Jasbinder Bilan	Asha and the Spirit Bird	Finalist	

=== 2021 ===
Category	Author	Title	Result	Ref.
OVERALL	Elle McNicoll	A Kind of Spark	Winner	
Illustrated Book	Bethan Stevens	The Grumpy Fairies	Category winner	
Illustrated Book	Eva Eland	Where Happiness Begins	Finalist	
Illustrated Book	Katie Cottle	The Blue Giant	Finalist	
Illustrated Book	Amyra Leon	Freedom, We Sing	Finalist	
Illustrated Book	Devon Holzwarth	Found You	Finalist	
Illustrated Book	Dawn Coulter-Cruttenden	Bear Shaped	Finalist	
Older Fiction	Darren Charlton	Wranglestone	Category winner	
Older Fiction	Dean Atta	The Black Flamingo	Finalist	
Older Fiction	Jordan Ifueko	Raybearer	Finalist	
Older Fiction	Sophie Gonzales	Only Mostly Devastated	Finalist	
Older Fiction	A. M. Dassu	Boy, Everywhere	Finalist	
Older Fiction	Danielle Jawando	And the Stars Were Burning Brightly	Finalist	
Younger Fiction	Elle McNicoll	A Kind of Spark	Category winner	
Younger Fiction	Kereen Getten	When Life Gives You Mangoes	Finalist	
Younger Fiction	Jenny Pearson	The Super Miraculous Journey of Freddie Yates	Finalist	
Younger Fiction	Alastair Chisholm	Orion Lost	Finalist	
Younger Fiction	Annabelle Sami	Llama Out Loud!	Finalist	
Younger Fiction	Francesca Gibbons	A Clock of Stars: The Shadow Moth	Finalist	

=== 2022 ===
Category	Author	Title	Publisher	Result	Ref.
OVERALL	Hannah Gold, illustrated by Levi Pinfold (HarperCollins Children's Books)	The Last Bear	HarperCollins Children's Books	Winner	
Illustrated Book	Harry Woodgate	Grandad's Camper	Andersen Press	Category winner	
Illustrated Book	Andy Harkness	Wolfboy	Bloomsbury Children's	Finalist	
Illustrated Book	Lu Fraser, illustrated by Mark McKinley	The Viking Who Liked Icing	Bloomsbury Children's	Finalist	
Illustrated Book	Steve Small	The Duck Who Didn't Like Water	Simon & Schuster	Finalist	
Illustrated Book	Helen Kellock	Out to Sea	Thames & Hudson	Finalist	
Illustrated Book	Barr Falls	Alone!	Farshore	Finalist	
Older Fiction	Ciara Smyth (Andersen Press)	Not My Problem	Andersen Press	Category winner	
Older Fiction	Femi Fadugba	The Upper World	PRH Children's	Finalist	
Older Fiction	Namina Forna	The Gilded Ones	Usborne	Finalist	
Older Fiction	Manjeet Mann	The Crossing	PRH Children's	Finalist	
Older Fiction	Michelle Quach	Not Here to Be Liked	Usborne	Finalist	
Older Fiction	Angeline Boulley	Firekeeper's Daughter	OneWorld	Finalist	
Younger Fiction	Hannah Gold, illustrated by Levi Pinfold	The Last Bear	HarperCollins Children's Books	Category winner	
Younger Fiction	Benjamin Dean, illustrated by Sandhya Prabhat	Me, My Dad and the End of the Rainbow	Simon & Schuster	Finalist	
Younger Fiction	Kelly Yang, illustrated by Maike Plenzke	Front Desk	Knights Of	Finalist	
Younger Fiction	Efua Traoré	Children of the Quicksands	The Chicken House	Finalist	
Younger Fiction	Mark Bradley	Bumble and Snug and the Angry Pirates	Hodder Children's Books	Finalist	
Younger Fiction	B. B. Alston, illustrated by Godwin Akpan	Amari and the Night Brothers	Farshore	Finalist	

=== 2023 ===
Category	Author	Title	Publisher	Result	Ref.
OVERALL	Nadia Mikail	The Cats We Meet Along the Way	Guppy Publishing	Winner	
Illustrated Book	Kim Hillyard	Gretel the Wonder Mammoth	PRH Children's	Category winner	
Illustrated Book	Georgia Buckthorn, illustrated by Isabella Mazzanti	The Fairy Garden	Ivy Kids	Finalist	
Illustrated Book	Emma Carlisle	What Do You See When You Look at a Tree?	Big Picture Press	Finalist	
Illustrated Book	Rachael Davis, illustrated by Beatrix Hatcher	I Am NOT a Prince	Hachette Children's Group	Finalist	
Illustrated Book	Stephen Hogtun	The Station Cat	DK	Finalist	
Illustrated Book	Jordan Stephens, illustrated by Beth Suzanna	The Missing Piece	Bloomsbury Children's Books	Finalist	
Older Fiction	Nadia Mikail	The Cats We Meet Along the Way	Guppy Publishing	Category winner	
Older Fiction	Erik J. Brown	All That's Left in the World	Hachette Children's Group	Finalist	
Older Fiction	Lewis Hancox	Welcome to St Hell	Scholastic	Finalist	
Older Fiction	Christine Pillainayagam	Ellie Pillai Is Brown	Faber and Faber	Finalist	
Older Fiction	Cynthia So	If You Still Recognise Me	Stripes Publishing	Finalist	
Older Fiction	Angharad Walker	Once Upon a Fever	The Chicken House	Finalist	
Younger Fiction	M. T. Khan	Nura and the Immortal Palace	Walker Books	Category winner	
Younger Fiction	David Farr	The Book of Stolen Dreams	Usborne Publishing	Finalist	
Younger Fiction	Hannah Moffatt	Small!	Everything with Words	Finalist	
Younger Fiction	Lee Newbery	The Last Firefox	PRH Children's	Finalist	
Younger Fiction	Varsha Shah	Ajay and the Mumbai Sun	The Chicken House	Finalist	
Younger Fiction	J. T. Williams, illustrated by Simone Douglas	The Lizzie and Belle Mysteries: Drama and Danger	Farshore	Finalist	

=== 2024 (20th anniversary) ===
Category	Author	Title	Publisher	Result	Ref.
OVERALL	Pari Thomson	Greenwild: The World Behind the Door	Macmillan	Winner	
Illustrated Book	Chloe Savage	The Search for the Giant Arctic Jellyfish	Walker Books	Category winner	
Illustrated Book	Marcela Ferreira, illustrated by Sally Agar	The Queen Next Door	Orchard Books	Finalist	
Illustrated Book	Natalie Labarre	Incredible Jobs You've (Probably) Never Heard Of	Nosy Crow	Finalist	
Illustrated Book	Ellan Rankin	The Secret Elephant	Wren & Rook	Finalist	
Illustrated Book	Kate Rolfe	Wolf and Bear	Two Hoots	Finalist	
Illustrated Book	Andrew Sanders, illustrated by Aysha Awwad	Whose Dog Is This?	Macmillan	Finalist	
Older Fiction	Kayvion Lewis	Thieves' Gambit	S&S	Category winner	
Older Fiction	Nick Brooks	Promise Boys	Macmillan	Finalist	
Older Fiction	Mel Darbon	What the World Doesn't See	Usborne	Finalist	
Older Fiction	Bea Fitzgerald	Girl, Goddess, Queen	Penguin	Finalist	
Older Fiction	Ayaan Mohamud	You Think You Know Me	Usborne	Finalist	
Older Fiction	Alexandra Sheppard	Friendship Never Ends	Knights Of	Finalist	
Younger Fiction	Pari Thomson	Greenwild: The World Behind the Door	Macmillan	Category winner	
Younger Fiction	J. J. Arcanjo	Crookhaven: The School for Thieves	Hodder	Finalist	
Younger Fiction	Emily-Jane Clark	The Beasts of Knobbly Bottom: Attack of the Vampire Sheep!	Scholastic	Finalist	
Younger Fiction	Lizzie Huxley-Jones	Vivi Conway and the Sword of Legend	Knights Of	Finalist	
Younger Fiction	Beth Lincoln	The Swifts	Puffin	Finalist	
Younger Fiction	G. M. Linton	My Name Is Sunshine Simpson	Usborne	Finalist	

=== 2025 ===
Category	Author	Title	Publisher	Result	Ref.
OVERALL	Mikey Please	The Cafe at the Edge of the Woods	Harper Collins	Winner	
Illustrated Book	Mikey Please	The Cafe at the Edge of the Woods	Harper Collins	Category winner	
Illustrated Book	Craig Barr-Green, illustrated by Francis Martin	Gina Kaminski Saves the Wolf	Little Tiger	Shortlisted	
Illustrated Book	Jana Curll	Mountain and Cloud	Penguin Random House	Shortlisted	
Illustrated Book	X. Fang	Dim Sum Palace	Pushkin Press	Shortlisted	
Older Readers	Nathanael Lessore	King of Nothing	Hot Key Books	Category winner	
Older Readers	Leanne Egan	Lover Birds	HarperCollins	Shortlisted	
Older Readers	Margaret McDonald	Glasgow Boys	Faber & Faber	Shortlisted	
Older Readers	Emily Varga	For She is Wrath	Pan Macmillan	Shortlisted	
Younger Readers	Carlos Sánchez	Rune	Flying Eye Books	Category winner	
Younger Readers	Piu DasGupta	Secrets of the Snakestone	Nosy Crow	Shortlisted	
Younger Readers	James Fox	The Boy in the Suit	Scholastic	Shortlisted	
Younger Readers	Clare Harlow	Tidemagic: The Many Faces of Ista Flit	Penguin Random House	Shortlisted	

=== 2026 ===
Category	Author	Title	Publisher	Result	Ref.
OVERALL	Huw Aaron	Sleep Tight, Disgusting Blob	Penguin Random House	Winner	
Illustrated Book	Huw Aaron	Sleep Tight, Disgusting Blob	Penguin Random House	Category winner	
Illustrated Book	Selina Brown, illustrated by Maxwell A. Oginni	My Rice Is Best	Penguin Random House	Shortlisted	
Illustrated Book	Jamie Carroll	Milo and the Mountain	O'Brien Press	Shortlisted	
Illustrated Book	Becky Colvin	The Great Green Island	Pan Macmillan	Shortlisted	
Older Readers	S. F. Williamson	A Language of Dragons	HarperCollins	Category winner	
Older Readers	Busayo Matuluko	'Til Death	Simon & Schuster	Shortlisted	
Older Readers	Grainne O'Brien	Solo	Little Island	Shortlisted	
Older Readers	Jihyun Yun	And the River Drags Her Down	Oneworld	Shortlisted	
Younger Readers	Janeen Hayat	Evie and Maryam's Family Tree	Guppy Publishing	Category winner	
Younger Readers	Huw Aaron	Unfairies	Penguin Random House	Shortlisted	
Younger Readers	Brogen Murphy	Wildlands	Penguin Random House	Shortlisted	
Younger Readers	Ashley Thorpe	Spirit Warriors	Usborne	Shortlisted	

== See also ==
- Waterstones Book of the Year
- Waterstones Debut Fiction Prize
- Waterstones Children's Laureate
- Waterstones 11
- Guardian First Book Award
