= The Mystery of the Painted Dragon =

Book by Katherine Woodfine

- First edition
- Author: Katherine Woodfine
- Language: English
- Series: The Sinclair's Mysteries
- Genre: Children
- Publisher: Egmont Publishing
- Publication place: United Kingdom
- Media type: Print (Paperback)
- Preceded by: The Mystery of the Jewelled Moth
- Followed by: The Mystery of the Midnight Peacock

The Mystery of the Painted Dragon is the third novel in The Sinclair's Mysteries book series by British children's author Katherine Woodfine published by Egmont Publishing. The novel is the third book in a four book mystery-adventure series set in Edwardian England. The first book in the series was The Mystery of the Clockwork Sparrow which was Waterstones Children's Book of the Month in June 2015.

== Plot ==
Sophie Taylor and Lillian "Lil" Rose, the main female protagonists, are quite bored from lack of mysteries to solve and the business of everyday life in Sinclair's. An art exhibition of some of the finest and most renowned work in the country is to be displayed in Sinclair's and one of the focal pieces is the Green Dragon by Benedetto Casselli, the second artwork in the Casselli sequence, a painting which was especially presented to the exhibition by His Majesty the King Edward VII. On the first day of the exhibition, the cloth supposedly covering the Green Dragon is removed and everyone is shocked to see that the original painting has been stolen and the copy painting of an art student at the Spencer Institute for Art, Leonora "Leo" Fitzgerald is replaced. Leo is present and insists that she didn't do it, as she disposed of her artwork after a rich art benefactor Mr Raymond Lyle criticised it, saying it did not resemble the original painting whatsoever despite its imaginative flair demonstrated in the artwork. Investigation by Detective Inspector Worth is held and he recruits Billy as his assistant in interviews, to which Billy is quite proud of. Sophie, Lil, Billy and Joe decide to investigate further and help Leo to discover the truth. They have perilous encounters, make risky decisions and face many obstacles. Will they find out who stole the painting, before it is too late?

== Characters ==
- Sophie Taylor-The main female protagonist, along with Lillian Rose. She was left penniless by her father, who died, after a failure to include her in his will. She went to work in the Millinery Department in Sinclair's Department Store, helping people choose and fit hats. She was bullied by her colleagues after turning up to training on her first day wearing her best clothes, instead of plain blouse and skirt. She quickly made friends in Billy Parker and Lillian Rose. She is quite cautious as she fears she is being hunted down by the Baron, as she has seen him and recognises his identity, which poses a threat to the Baron of being exposed to the police. She is a smart, kind girl who has wits and charm about her. She is described as mousy and short.
- Lillian "Lil" Rose-The main female protagonist, along with Sophie Taylor. She comes from a wealthy background and her parents despised her ambitions to become an actress, wishing her to become a debutante in high society. She pursues her dreams carefully. She works as a chorus girl in several productions, mainly "The Shop Girl" and she also played Arabella in "The Inheritance". Besides her theatrical work, she is a "Captain's Girl" (a manikin for the latest fashions). She is described as being tall, dark and being wonderfully beautiful.
- Leonora "Leo" Fitzgerald-The secondary female protagonist. She comes from an aristocratic background and her family is well-known. Her parents refused to let her go to art school, but eventually gave in after persuasion of Lady Tremayne, Leo's godmother. Leo's family home is Winter Hall. She goes to the Spencer Institute of Art in London and she is described by many people as a brilliantly talented artist who needs to rise up in confidence. Mr Raymond Lyle, an art benefactor, requested her to make a copy of Benedetto Casselli's Green Dragon. When the Green Dragon is stolen, Leo's copy is left in its place, which arouses suspicion on Leo as the thief of Casselli's Green Dragon. It is up to her and her new-found friends to find it in time...
