= The Mystery of the Jewelled Moth =

2016 novel by Katherine Woodfine

- Author: Katherine Woodfine
- Cover artist: Julia Sarda
- Language: English
- Genre: Children
- Publisher: Egmont Publishing
- Publication date: 4 June 2015
- Publication place: United Kingdom
- Media type: Print (Paperback)
- Pages: 352
- ISBN: 9781405276184
- Preceded by: The Mystery of the Clockwork Sparrow

The Mystery of the Jewelled Moth is the second novel in The Sinclair's Mysteries series by British children's author Katherine Woodfine, publishing by Egmont Publishing in February 2016. The novel is the second book in a four-book mystery-adventure series set in Edwardian England. The first book in the series was The Mystery of the Clockwork Sparrow which was Waterstones Children's Book of the Month in June 2015.

== Plot ==
Sophie is an orphan who was left penniless when her father died, due to an error in the will. In The Mystery of the Clockwork Sparrow, Sophie finds a job in the millinery department of Sinclair's Department store, London's newest and greatest, and makes friends with Billy, a junior porter with an uncle already working in the store, and Lil, a "mannequin" by day and an aspiring actress by night. In The Mystery of the Jewelled Moth, the Jewelled Moth, a priceless piece of jewellery, disappears and again Sophie, Lil and Billy have to solve the mystery, this time by infiltrating Lord Beaucastle's fancy dress ball. Sophie had come face to face in The Mystery of the Clockwork Sparrow with the mysterious Baron, the arch-villain of the East End, and in The Mystery of the Jewelled Moth, she gets even closer, this time finally uncovering the barons true Identity.

== Characters ==
- Sophie: The main character, an orphan whose father died and left her penniless
- Lil: Sophie's best friend, whom she met when they both started working at Sinclair's Department Store
- Billy: A friend of Sophie's, whom she also met at Sinclair's Department Store and shows feeling for Sophie
- Joe: A street urchin, whom the trio first met when he hid in the basement of Sinclair's Department Store to hide from the East End gang he escaped. He shows romance for Lil.
- The Baron: The mysterious criminal mastermind

== Publishing details ==
- Author: Katherine Woodfine
- First published: February 2016
- ISBN 9781405276184
- Publisher: Egmont Publishing
- Age range: 9+ years
- Genre: Children's Mystery Adventure Series
