= Oscar's Book Prize =

British children's book prize

Oscar's Book Prize is a British children's book prize awarded annually to a book for pre-school age children, which was first published in the UK during the previous calendar year. The £5,000 prize is supported by the London Evening Standard and sponsored by Amazon and the National Literacy Trust, its patron is Princess Beatrice. Actor Gillian Anderson was one of the judges for the 2015 prize. In 2021, the prize money was raised to £10,000.

The prize was founded in 2014 by James Ashton and Viveka Alvestrand in memory of their three-year-old son Oscar Ashton who died unexpectedly in 2012. It aims to celebrate a child's love for magical stories and to reward the creativity of early-years literature and to highlight the importance of reading with children.

== 2014 ==
The 2014 prize was awarded to Benji Davies for The Storm Whale.

Shortlisted Books List

Title	Author(s)
Open Very Carefully	Nick Bromley and Nicola O'Byrne
The Black Rabbit	Philippa Leathers
The Snatchabook	Thomas Docherty
The Storm Whale	Benji Davies
Spaghetti with the Yeti	Charlotte Guillain, Adam Guillain, and Lee Wildish

== 2015 ==
The 2015 prize was awarded to Steve Antony for The Queen's Hat.

Shortlisted Books List

Title	Author(s)
Dangerous!	Tim Warnes
Hedgehugs	Steve Wilson and Lucy Tapper
The Queen's Hat	Steve Antony
The Sea Tiger	Victoria Turnbull
This Book Just Ate My Dog!	Richard Byrne

== 2016 ==
The 2016 prize was awarded to Gemma Merino for The Cow Who Climbed a Tree.

Shortlisted Books List

Title	Author(s)
Hector And Hummingbird	Nicholas John Frith
Sir Lilypad	Anna Kemp and Sara Ogilvie
The Cow Who Climbed A Tree	Gemma Merino
The Fox And The Star	Coralie Bickford-Smith
The Lion Inside	Rachel Bright and Jim Field

== 2017 ==
The 2017 prize was awarded to Rachel Bright and Jim Field for The Koala Who Could.

Shortlisted Books List

Title	Author(s)
Hello, Mr Dodo	Nicholas John Frith
Odd Dog Out	Rob Biddulph
The Knight Who Wouldn't Fight	Thomas Docherty
The Koala Who Could	Rachel Bright and Jim Field
There's A Tiger In The Garden	Lizzy Stewart

== 2018 ==
The 2018 prize was awarded to John Dougherty and Laura Hughes for There's a Pig Up My Nose.

Shortlisted Books List

Title	Author(s)
Lucie Goose	Danny Baker and Pippa Curnick
That Bear Can't Babysit	Ruth Quayle and Alison Friend
The Secret of Black Rock	Joe Todd Stanton
There's a Pig Up My Nose	John Dougherty and Laura Hughes
Sunk!	Rob Biddulph

== 2019 ==
The 2019 prize was awarded to Ed Vere for How to be a Lion.

Shortlisted Books List

Title	Author(s)
Almost Anything	Sophie Henn
Ruby's Worry	Tom Percival
The Way Home for Wolf	Rachel Bright and Jim Field
How to be a Lion	Ed Vere
Baby’s First Bank Heist	Jim Whalley and Stephen Collins

== 2020 ==
The 2020 prize was awarded to Benji Davies for Tad.

Shortlisted Books List

Title	Author(s)
The Suitcase	Chris Naylor-Ballesteros
A Mouse Called Julian	Joe Todd Stanton
Alphonse, There’s Mud on the Ceiling!	Daisy Hirst
I Am a Tiger	Karl Newson and Ross Collins
The Runaway Pea	Kjartan Poskitt and Alex Willmore
Tad	Benji Davies

== 2021 ==
The 2021 prize was awarded to Lu Fraser and illustrator Kate Hindley for The Littlest Yak.

Shortlisted Books List

Title	Author(s)
I’m Sticking with you	Smriti Halls and Steve Small
Meesha Makes Friends	Tom Percival
Rain Before Rainbows	Smriti Halls and David Litchfield
The Hospital Dog	Julia Donaldson and Sara Ogilvie
The Littlest Yak	Lu Fraser and Kate Hindley
Would You Like A Banana by	Yasmeen Ismail
