= The Boy Who Knew Everything =

Book by Victoria Forester

- Cover of The Boy Who Knew Everything
- Author: Victoria Forester
- Genre: Fantasy
- Published: October 27, 2015
- Publisher: Feiwel and Friends
- Publication place: US
- Preceded by: The Girl Who Could Fly
- Followed by: The Girl Who Fell Out Of The Sky

The Boy Who Knew Everything is the sequel to Victoria Forester's first book The Girl Who Could Fly. It was released on October 27, 2015.

== Development ==
On February 16, 2015, Victoria Forester announced the book and revealed the cover art by Iacopo Bruno.

== Reception ==
The Boy Who Knew Everything has received mixed reviews. Kirkus Reviews wrote, "Classic quest elements are present, as is the unending battle between good and evil. Forester provides plenty of action, engagingly spunky (if fairly two-dimensional) characters, and sufficient length to bring resolution to most elements of the plot, though sometimes at the expense of logic." Booklist gave it an average review, writing, "This follow-up is less focused and more expansive than the previous title. There are oodles of characters to keep track of, and the second half, in which the children, now part of a larger prophecy, find themselves in a mysterious world, seems almost like another book. What keeps this centered when the action soars in many different directions from the farm, to the White House, to the secret world is the firm friendship of Piper and Conrad." School Library Journal said, "As in its predecessor, this installment straddles the real and the imagined. At times, this blend coalesces beautifully, but often it proves a bit clunky. The folksy colloquialisms uttered by Piper and her parents still feel out of place, leaving readers a little unsettled as to the setting. Its greatest strength emerges when the tale balances quiet moments of self-realization, identity, and friendship with an action-packed plot."
