= The Girl Who Could Fly =

Book by Victoria Forester

- 2010 Paperback Edition
- Author: Victoria Forester
- Language: English
- Genre: Modern Fantasy / Sci-Fi
- Publisher: Macmillan
- Publication date: June 24, 2008
- Publication place: U.S.A.
- Media type: Print
- Pages: 329
- ISBN: 978-0-545-24392-6
- Followed by: The Boy Who Knew Everything

The Girl Who Could Fly is a 2008 New York Times bestselling children's novel by Victoria Forester.

== Plot ==
Piper McCloud is a farm girl who lives in Lowland County with her parents, Betty and Joe McCloud. She is characterized as talkative and imaginative. Her parents, primarily her mother, shield her from the outside world because she has the innate ability to float. This power was discovered when Piper was a baby by Betty, who believes it is karmic punishment because she was too old for children when Piper was born. After noticing that baby birds learn to fly from being pushed out of the nest, Piper decides to jump off of the roof. This works and she discovers she has the ability to fly as well as float. This worries Betty, and Piper is forbidden from continuing her pursuit of flying. Disregarding this, Piper perfects her flying in secret.

Betty later tells Piper that they'll be going to the Fourth of July picnic. This excites Piper, since it is her first social event (and chance to make friends) outside of the doctor and church. However, Millie Mae Miller, the McClouds' neighbor and local gossip, has spread a rumor that Piper is mentally unwell and that's why she isn't allowed to go to school. Piper meets a girl named Sally Sue, and the two begin to become friends. Before this friendship can grow, however, Sally Sue is revealed to be Millie Mae's daughter and begins being rude to Piper over the rumors. Piper lashes out and reveals she saw Millie Mae kick the Millers' dog. Sally Sue is scared and - not knowing that Piper can fly - thinks she is spying on her family.

After this debacle, the children organize a baseball game, for which Piper is picked last. Piper embarrasses herself when she continuously misses the ball during the game, which delights Millie Mae and seems to make Betty and Joe feel bad. Determined to prove herself, Piper flies into the air to catch a fly ball. Everyone falls silent and fearful, grabbing their children and leaving the scene. The next morning, Piper finds her house surrounded by reporters trying to get the latest scoop on 'The Girl Who Could Fly'. A bodiless voice (later revealed to be J) tries to communicate with Piper in her room.

The McCloud family is soon contacted by Dr. Letitia Hellion, the head of an organization called I.N.S.A.N.E. (Institute of Normality, Stability, And Non- Exceptionality). After a visit from Dr. Hellion, Piper eventually agrees to reside in the academy and board, on the condition that she does not fly. Her father gives her a hand carved bird tied to a blue ribbon wrapped in a handkerchief before she leaves as something to remember him by.

When she does arrive, she enters the school and takes the elevator down to Level Thirteen with Dr. Hellion, who explains that not only do they foster humans, but plants and animals with unique abilities as well. Piper is given a uniform and asked about her food preferences before arriving at Level Thirteen, where all the children live and learn. She meets the other members of the academy as well, including Ahmed and Nalen Mustafa (who can control the weather), Bella Lovely (who can change the color of objects), Boris Yeltsinov (introduced later in the story, and can turn objects to stone), Conrad Harrington III (who has super-human intelligence), Daisy (who has super-strength), Jasper (who has forgotten his ability), Kimber (who can manipulate electricity), Lily Yakimoto (who has telekinesis), Myrtle Grabtrash (who has super-human speed), Smitty (who has x-ray vision), and Violet (who shrinks or grows based on her emotional state). All of the students are hostile to Piper at first, but after outwitting Lily, she earns most of their respect. Conrad, however, is still openly hostile to her and the rest of the class.

One mealtime, Bella is seen making rainbows. At first, everyone cheers until they realize Bella is crying. Conrad had told her the nefarious true intentions of I.N.S.A.N.E. (to eradicate their gifts), and Bella is not able to cope with this. She has a nervous break, forgets her powers, and it announced she will be sent home.

Piper bonds with Dr. Hellion and the kids but at the graduation of a now powerless Bella, Conrad finally pushes her to her tipping point. He steals her hand-carved bird and throws down the chute to the incinerator. She attacks Conrad and they are both sent to Dr. Hellion's office. While on their way, Piper escapes to the incinerator and meets a growling rose, which a machine nearby sprays a gray, acidic substance on. She meets a turtle with a heavy block crushing its back. Piper decides to leave her bird and save the animals. She frees the turtle who leaps into the air, escaping out of a window. Whilst trying to catch it, Piper finds a black cricket and finds he is being bound with sticky glue. Using some Q tips, she gets rid of the glue and takes the cricket, which she names Sebastian. She hears two adults coming and hides in a dark room, where she finds a chained giraffe. She strokes it lovingly and it glows in happiness.

While hiding, she hears Dr. Hellion's voice. When the scientists find the black cricket missing, CCTV reveals Piper took it. Dr. Hellion walks to her office, thinking Piper is there. Piper flies with difficulty to the woman's office and spots a phone, which she uses to dial her parents. Conrad ends the call and dissects the phone, proving it to be bugged. He hands her her wooden bird and explains he made a replica and threw the replica in the trash. He tells her to keep the cricket and play along. Conrad immediately blurts to Dr. Hellion that Piper was hiding something, and tells her Bella took a black cricket and let Piper touch it. Dr. Hellion questions him about the fight over him throwing Piper's bird in the trash, which he denies and Piper holds her bird up.

After lights out, Conrad explains that the academy, called I.N.S.A.N.E, tries to make everything that walks through its doors normal. Through the food, they give the children a unique formula tailored to deactivate their abilities. They do the same thing with the animals and plants, and if all fails, I.N.S.A.N.E. destroys them. Conrad was only picking on Piper so she could wake up and fly. Piper refuses to escape with him unless the rest are going, and begins to encourage them to dream about using their talents in a good way. The only person she can't get an answer out of is Jasper, who is scheduled to graduate soon (students graduate once they have fully lost their power). Conrad and Piper tell the kids about I.N.S.A.N.E. and plan an escape.

The escape plan fails and Dr. Hellion puts Piper in a M.O.L.D. (Molecular Orientating Limitation Device), then leaves to wait for Piper to succumb. A man with the power of invisibility known as J reveals himself and tries to get Piper out, but she refuses and J leaves. Sebastian comes and sings to her, revealing his talent, but is effectively killed by Dr. Hellion with agent A's shoe, which causes Piper to blackout.

Afterward, it is revealed that Conrad had betrayed his classmates. Dr. Hellion has found out about the students’ escape plan and threatened Conrad to remove his frontal lobe. He makes a deal with Dr. Hellion that if he tells her the details of the escape plan, he will be released from I.N.S.A.N.E. However, Dr. Hellion tricked Conrad, stating that since a guardian's signature is required to permit his leaving and that she was placed as his caretaker by his father, Conrad could not leave.

Conrad is confused about how he could have possibly failed and isolates himself. He realizes that he has the most likely answers to questions, but not the right ones. Piper arrives a few weeks later and Conrad wakes from weeks of lying in bed, thinking that she might know the answers. The kids find that Piper has forgotten who she was and is physically disabled. Later, when the students tried to escape again, they struggle about what to do with Piper. Conrad announces that he'll stay behind Piper to confront authorities. Jasper refuses and finally remembers his talent, which is healing. He heals Piper and she remembers herself and how to fly. They revolt instead of escape, which seems to succeed. Conrad then tries to convince his father, an important politician, to give ownership of the school to the kids. As the children are leaving the school to catch a glimpse of the sun, Dr. Hellion is waiting for them with a stun baton. Piper and Dr. Hellion fight, who grabs Piper's leg as she flies off, leading to Dr. Hellion uncovering she also has the ability to fly. She expresses guilt over the death of her sister, Sarah, who fell to her death after Letitia carried her into the sky. Piper is not able to convince the woman to re-embrace her abilities and Dr. Hellion, like Sarah did, falls to her death.

I.N.S.A.N.E. becomes a safe-haven for plants and animals with special abilities under the guidance of the former students. Piper reunites with Joe and Betty, who come to accept her ability to fly. Several months later, Conrad joins Piper as a part of her family, being abandoned by his own. Later, after the gifted children help Piper win the Lowland County Fourth of July Baseball game, Conrad and Piper are talking on the roof. Piper reveals to him that J came to her and told her that the kids from I.N.S.A.N.E. were not safe yet, and there was another, hidden place where they belonged instead.

== Reception ==
The book won the Bank Street Best Children's Book of the Year, the Black-Eyed Susan Award, Booklist Editors' Choice, Florida Sunshine State Young Readers Award Master List, Indiana Young Hoosier Award Master List, and the Utah Beehive Book Award Master List Awards. The novel was under the Top 10 First Novels for Youth. As of November 7, 2015, it was on the New York Times Bestseller List for 6 weeks. Kirkus Reviews wrote, "This fantasy has an air of reality, maintained by the aw-shucks flavor of the dialogue and its determined, good-as-gold heroine." Booklist gave it a starred review and said, "Best of all is the book’s strong, lightly wrapped messages about friendship and authenticity and the difference between doing well and doing good." The Horn Book Review said, "Any child who has felt different will take strength from Piper’s fight to be herself against the tide of family, church, and society.” Author of the Twilight series Stephenie Meyer praised the book, "It’s the oddest/sweetest mix of Little House on the Prairie and X-Men. I was smiling the whole time (except for the part where I cried). I gave it to my mom, and I’m reading it to my kids-it’s multigenerational. Prepare to have your heart warmed."

== Sequel ==
A sequel, The Boy Who Knew Everything, was released on October 27, 2015. The 3rd book, The Girl Who Fell Out Of The Sky, came out in January 2020.
