= Jenny Pearson =

British teacher and children's author

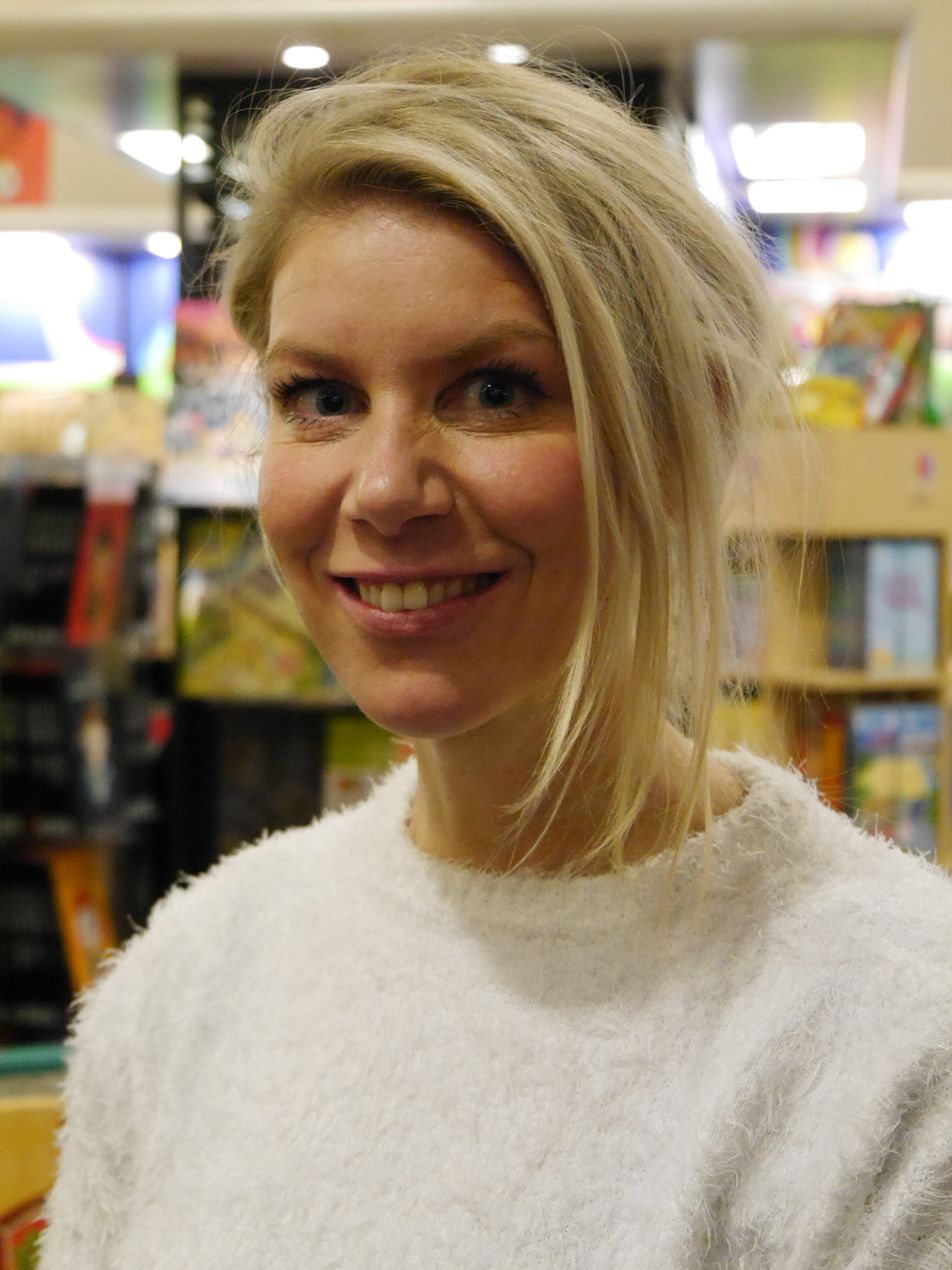
- Jenny Pearson, Waterstones, Piccadilly, London, 2022
- Occupations: Teacher, Author

Jenny Pearson is a British teacher and children's author. She is best known for her books The Super Miraculous Journey of Freddie Yates (2020) and The Incredible Record Smashers (2021).

== Early life ==
Pearson is from Salisbury. She attended South Wilts Grammar School.

== The Super Miraculous Journey of Freddie Yates (2020) ==
The Super Miraculous Journey of Freddie Yates, illustrated by Rob Biddulph, was published on 12 May 2020 by Usborne in the UK and Norton Young Readers in the US. The book has sold to eighteen countries.

Kirkus Reviews called it a "goofball comedy with heart," and The Guardian referred to it as a "caper of a debut." The Times said it was "very funny". Booklist noted that the book's main character, "Freddie, ends up with expanded definitions of both family and miracles, and readers will, too."

The Super Miraculous Journey of Freddie Yates was shortlisted for the 2021 Branford Boase Award.

== The Incredible Record Smashers (2021) ==
The Incredible Record Smashers, illustrated by Erica Salcedo, was published March 4, 2021 by Usborne Publishing.

The Times called it "a genuinely funny novel with a mental health theme".

== Awards and honours ==
Awards for Pearson's writing
Year	Title	Award	Result	Ref,
2021	The Super Miraculous Journey of Freddie Yates	Waterstones Children's Book Prize for Younger Readers	Finalist	
2021	The Super Miraculous Journey of Freddie Yates	Branford Boase Award	Shortlist	

== Publications ==
- The Super Miraculous Journey of Freddie Yates, illustrated by Rob Biddulph (2020)
- The Incredible Record Smashers, illustrated by Erica Salcedo (2021)
- Operation Nativity (2022)
