= Sita Brahmachari =

British author

Sita Brahmachari FRSL
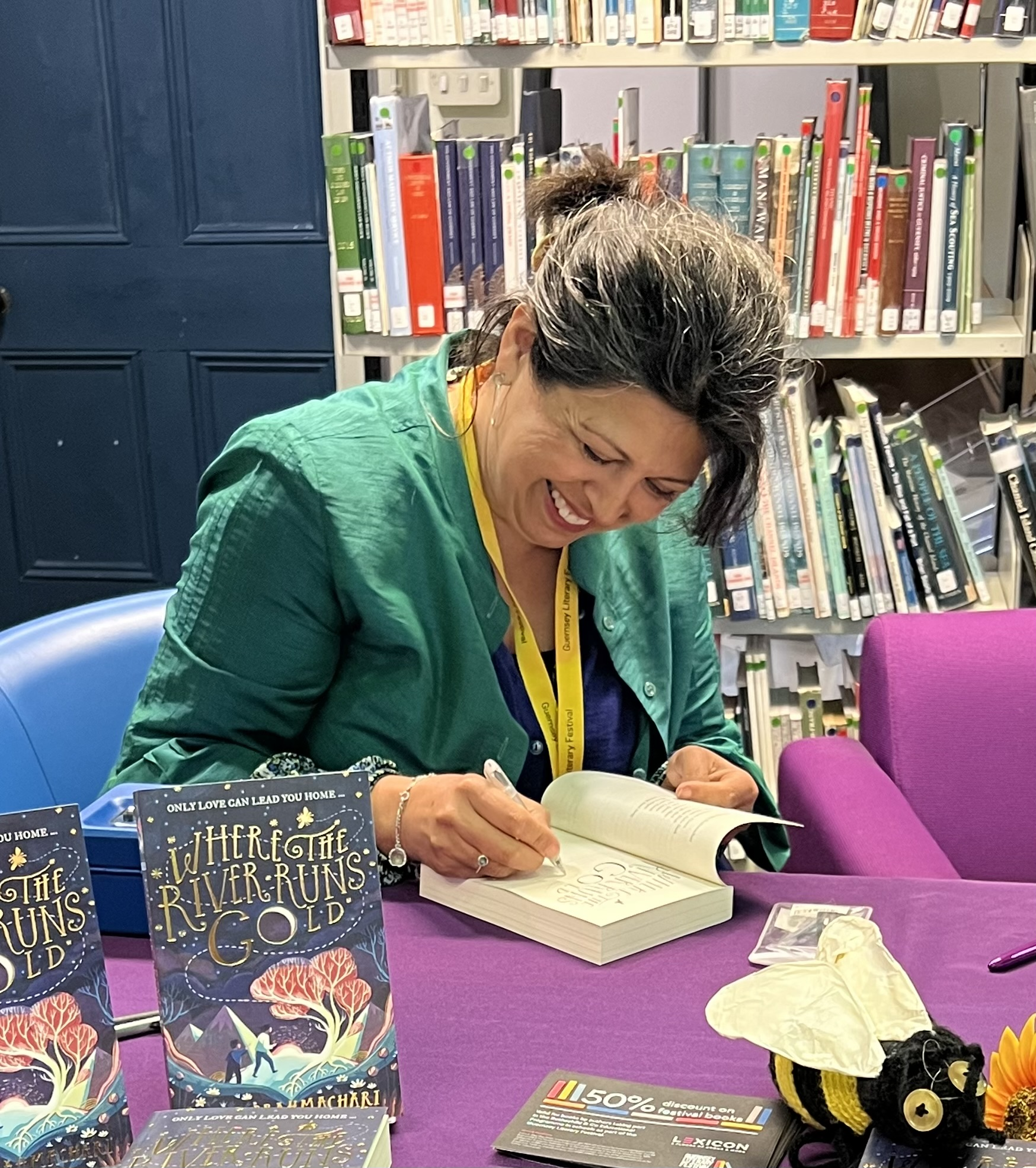
- Sita Brahmachari at Guernsey Book Festival
- Born: 1966 (age 59–60) Derby, England
- Education: Bristol University, Royal Central School of Speech and Drama
- Notable awards: Waterstones Children's Book Prize (2011)

Sita Brahmachari (born 1966) is a British author known for her work in children's and young adult literature. Her debut novel, Artichoke Hearts, later published in the United States as Mira in the Present Tense, won the 2011 Waterstones Children's Book Prize. In 2025, Brahmachari was made a Fellow of the Royal Society of Literature.

== Early life and education ==
Brahmachari was born in Derby, England in 1966. Her father was a doctor from Kolkata, who emigrated from India in the 1950s, and her mother was a nurse from Lake District.

After completing her A-levels, Brahmachari worked as an au pair in France, and attended Le Cours Florent Drama College. She later attended Bristol University and completed a Master of Arts at the Royal Central School of Speech and Drama.

== Career ==
Brahmachari's debut novel, Artichoke Hearts, which was later published in the United States as Mira in the Present Tense, was based on her mother-in-law and published by Macmillan in 2011. The book won the 2011 Waterstones Children's Book Prize. The novel was followed by Jasmine Skies, which was nominated for the Carnegie Medal.

The following year, Brahmachari took on the position of Writer-in-Residence at the Islington Centre for Refugees and Migrants. The same year, she became Patron of Reading at Fortismere School.

Brahmachari also wrote the script for The Arrival, a play based on a graphic novel by Shaun Tan, which was produced by Kristine Landon-Smith in 2013.

In 2015, Brahmachari was appointed as an online writer-in-residence with BookTrust for a six-month term.

She has also been a human rights ambassador for Amnesty International.

== Awards and recognitions ==
In 2018, Tender Earth was on the IBBY honour list for writing. In 2018, Where the River Runs Gold was selected as the Waterstone's Children’s Book of the Month (July 2019). In 2020, When Secrets Set Sail was selected as a Blackwell’s Children’s Book of the Month. In 2021, When Shadows Fall was named one of the best children's books of the year by The Guardian and The Times.

Awards for Brahmachari's writing
Year	Title	Award	Result	Ref.
2011	Artichoke Hearts	Waterstones Children's Books Prize	Winner	
2012	Artichoke Hearts	Redbridge Children's Book Award	Winner	
2012	Artichoke Hearts	Carnegie Medal	Longlist	
2013	Jasmine Skies	Carnegie Medal	Longlist	
2014	Kite Spirit	UKLA Book Award	Longlist	
2016	Red Leaves	Carnegie Medal	Nominee	
2018	Tender Earth	Little Rebels Award	Shortlist	
2018	Tender Earth	IBBY Certificate of Honour	Winner	
2018	Tender Earth	Carnegie Medal	Nominee	
2018	Worry Angels	Jhalak Prize	Longlist	
2019	Worry Angels	Carnegie Medal	Nominee	
2019	Zebra Crossing Soul Song	Carnegie Medal	Nominee	
2023	When Shadows Fall	Carnegie Medal	Shortlist	

== Publications ==
=== Novels ===
==== Mira Levenson series ====
1. Artichoke Hearts. Macmillan Publishers. 2011. ISBN 9780330517911.
2. Jasmine Skies. Macmillan Publishers. 2012. ISBN 9781447205180.
3. Tender Earth. Macmillan Publishers. 2017. ISBN 9781509812509.

==== Standalone books ====
- Kite Spirit. Macmillan Publishers. 2013. ISBN 9780330517928.
- Red Leaves. Macmillan Publishers. 2014. ISBN 9781447262985.
- Where the River Runs Gold. Hachette Australia. 2019. ISBN 9781510105416.
- When Secrets Set Sail. Hachette Book Group. 2020. ISBN 9781510105430.
- Swallow's Kiss. Illustrated by Jane Ray. Pop Up Projects CIC. 2021. ISBN 9781838323509.
- When Shadows Fall. Illustrated by Natalie Sirett. Little Tiger. 2022. ISBN 9781788953160.

=== Novellas ===
- Brace Mouth False Teeth. Barrington Stoke. 2014. ISBN 9781781124000.
- Car Wash Wish. Barrington Stoke. 2016. ISBN 9781781125236.
- Worry Angels. Illustrated by Jane Ray. Barrington Stoke. 2017. ISBN 9781781126950.
- Corey's Rock. Illustrated by Jane Ray. Otter-Barry Books. 2018. ISBN 9781910959978.
- Zebra Crossing Soul Song. Barrington Stoke. 2018. ISBN 9781781126967.
- The River Whale. Orion Children's Books. 2021. ISBN 9781510109148.
- Phoenix Brothers. Oxford University Press 2025. ISBN 978-1382064491

=== Plays ===
- Landon-Smith, Kristine (2013). The Arrival. Methuen Drama. ISBN 9781472535009. Based on the original illustrated novel by Shaun Tan.

=== Contributions ===
- Re-Imagine India-UK Cultural Relations in the 21st Century (Bloomsbury 2014) ISBN 978-9382951346
- I'll Be Home for Christmas (Little Tiger 2016) ISBN 978-1847157720
- Here I Stand (Walker Books 2016) ISBN 1406373648
- A Country of Refuge (Unbound 2016) ISBN 978-1783522682
- A Country to Call Home (Unbound 2018) ISBN 978-1783526048
- Diverse Shorts (The English and Media Centre 2018) ISBN 978-1906101510
- One Snowy Night. Illustrated by Alison Edgson. Little Tiger. 2019. ISBN 9781788950039.
- The Book of Hopes (Bloomsbury Children's Books 2020) ISBN 978-1526629883
- Iridescent Adolescent (The English and Media Centre 2020) ISBN 978-1906101688
- Swallowed by a Whale - How to Survive the Writing Life (British Library 2020) ISBN 9780712353038
- Letters From Lockdown (Hodder & Stoughton Home 2021) ISBN 978-1526364364
- Poems for Schools (Magma Poetry 2023)
- Our Rights - Stories and Poems About Children's Rights (Otter-Barry 2023) ISBN 9781913074210
