= Sleep Tight, Disgusting Blob =

Children's picture book

- Author: Huw Aaron
- Cover artist: Huw Aaron
- Language: English, Welsh
- Genre: Bedtime story
- Published: March 2025
- Publisher: Puffin Books
- Publication place: United Kingdom
- Media type: Print (paperback)
- Pages: 32 (paperback edition)
- Award: Waterstones Children's Book Prize (2026)
- ISBN: 978-0-241-68445-0
- OCLC: 1481933598

Sleep Tight, Disgusting Blob (Welsh: Nos Da, Blob)is a children's picture book, written and illustrated by Huw Aaron. It was first published by Puffin Books, an imprint of Penguin Random House, in March 2025. It won the 2026 overall Waterstones Children's Book Prize.

The book is about a parent blob encouraging their child to bed and to sleep with a rhyming list of other little monsters' bedtime activities.

== Reception ==
The Times wrote that the book is a "lovely rhyming tale that understands you're never too young for a bit of gentle irony". Blackpool Gazette described it as "full of warmth, humour, slime and blobby kisses". The Guardian's reviewer said that it was "sharp, fun and brimming with attention to detail".

== Publication history ==
- 2025, United Kingdom, Puffin Books ISBN 978-0-241-68445-0, publication date 27 March 2025, paperback
- 2025, United States, Viking Press ISBN 978-0-593-69539-5, publication date 1 July 2025, paperback
