= Between Two Seas =

2008 children's novel by Marie-Louise Jensen

- Author: Marie-Louise Jensen
- Language: English
- Genre: Children's
- Publisher: Oxford University Press
- Publication date: 3 January 2008
- Publication place: United Kingdom
- Pages: 320 pp
- ISBN: 978-0-19-275530-8
- OCLC: 173498568

Between Two Seas is a children's novel by Marie-Louise Jensen. It was shortlisted for the Waterstone's Children's Book Prize. It is about a young girl, Marianne Shaw, who sets out on a journey to Denmark in search of her father, after her mother dies in England.

== Plot summary ==
The story starts in 1885, Grimsby, England. Marianne is the illegitimate daughter of a once wealthy English woman and a Danish father, who left her mother not knowing that she was pregnant, and promising to return to England one day. Marianne's mother is dangerously ill and on her deathbed, gives Marianne some money, telling her to search for her father in Denmark.

Marianne's mother dies, poor and friendless, living in squalid surroundings in Grimsby. Marianne starts the perilous journey to Skagen, Denmark to find her father. The journey is long and hard, and finally she arrives at Skagen, now penniless and destitute, and foreign, unable to speak Danish, only to find that her father, Lars Christensen, has been dead for years which is why he did not return for her mother.

Marianne is stranded in Skagen with nowhere to go, and so is forced to stay with a poor fisherman's family as a servant. They live in a horribly dirty house with grime on the walls and windows, where the children are covered with lice, the mother suffers from post-natal depression, the father is a drunk and they have barely enough food to live on. Nevertheless, Marianne works and lives there in exchange for a little bit of food and lodging.

Marianne is afraid to tell anyone of her birth, fearing that they will despise and ridicule her, as everyone did in London. However, she befriends a girl called Hannah, who is also an illegitimate child. She is surprised at how everyone in Skagen accepts Hannah into society and does not seem to mind about her origin. She is still afraid to tell anyone, even Hannah, about her birth, though.

She discovers that her father had a brother, who still resides in Skagen. She contemplates telling her Uncle about her existence, however, she decides against it on finding that he has a reputation for being a very strict man. She is afraid that he will despise her birth, even though they are family. She becomes close friends with his son, and grows to treat him like a cousin, although he himself is unaware that they are related.

She falls in love with a young fisherman named Peter, but her love for painting and rumours about her friendship with a French painter, separates them. They come together again at the end, and Peter proposes. She accepts but says she wants to carry on learning to paint. She is also reunited with her father, who was really the man she thought was her uncle.
