= 13 Treasures =

2009 juvenile fantasy novel by Michelle Harrison

- Author: Michelle Harrison
- Series: The Thirteen Treasures
- Genre: Juvenile fantasy
- Publisher: Hachette Digital
- Publication date: 2009
- Media type: online
- ISBN: 978-0-316-04148-5
- Followed by: 13 Curses; 13 Secrets

13 Treasures is a 2009 juvenile fantasy novel written by Michelle Harrison; it is the first entry in the trilogy "The Thirteen Treasures". It follows a young girl named Tanya, who has the ability to see mythical creatures.

== Awards ==
13 Treasures won the 2009 Waterstone's Children's Book Prize.

== Plot ==
Tanya is a 13-year-old girl who has the ability to see and hear fairies and other creatures, but has often had to lie to hide this from others, as it has caused her family to send her to therapists and doctors. Following another incident, Tanya is sent to live with her grandmother Florence for the summer at Elvesden Manor, which has been passed down through generations. There, she meets Warwick's son Fabian and his father, Amos, who has been accused of being connected to the disappearance of Morwenna Bloom fifty years ago, as he was the last person to see her before she disappeared in the nearby woods.

Tanya and Fabian struggle to get along at first, but become friends as they spend time together. In the local village of Tickey End, Tanya meets the reclusive "witch" Mad Morag, who gives her an old compass. Later, while cleaning out a library, Tanya finds a silver bracelet with thirteen charms on it. As she and Fabian team up to investigate Morwenna Bloom's disappearance and prove Amos' innocence, Tanya befriends a girl named Red (or Rowan), who saves changelings from dying in a hospital before their disguises wear off and they are killed for their appearance. It is revealed that one can only have the "second sight" of being able to see fairies by having a changeling in their family, which, in Tanya's family, is revealed to be Elizabeth Elvesden.

Tanya, Red, and Fabian head into the woods following Morwenna's hidden instructions in a poem, and it is revealed that she entered the fairy world following her disappearance and now wants to return to Earth. The reason Florence dislikes Morwenna is that after she nearly entered the fairy world herself, Morwenna threatened to take Tanya's mother into the fairy world. However, Florence tricked her into giving her twenty-eight more years before that happened, and now she aims to take Tanya.

As Red is bound by vines at midnight, Fabian heads to find Morwenna's lock of hair, which is preventing her from aging. It is revealed that Amos loved Morwenna and blames himself for her disappearance, and that Warwick is a fairy hunter who gained the ability to see fairies after drinking a special potion. Fabian and Warwick take the hair to the middle of the forest and burn it. As Tanya is about to get dragged into the fairy world, Red cuts her own hand and the vines take her instead. With the lock of hair destroyed, Morwenna suddenly ages fifty years and dies of shock. Afterwards, Tanya returns to the mansion and talks with Florence, and they forgive each other.
