= Silence is Goldfish =

Book by Annabel Pitcher

- First edition
- Author: Annabel Pitcher
- Language: English
- Genre: Young adult and adult
- Publisher: Indigo division of Orion Publishing Group
- Publication date: September 2015
- Publication place: United Kingdom
- ISBN: 978-1-78062-000-8

Silence is Goldfish is the third novel by Annabel Pitcher. It tells the story of a girl named Tess who, upon discovering a family secret, decides to stop talking as a result of her rage. All her life she's had a pressure to please her parents and be a certain way, so decides to completely withdraw from everyone and everything she's ever known. The book was published in 2015 by Indigo, an imprint of Orion Children's Books.
