= Kirsty Applebaum =

English author

- Born: 1970 (age 55–56); Essex, England
- Occupation: Children's writer
- Website: https://www.kirstyapplebaum.co.uk/

Kirsty Applebaum (born 1970) is an English children's author.

== Biography ==
Applebaum was born in Essex and grew up in Hampshire. Her working life included railway re-signalling and teaching Pilates, as well as menial jobs. She graduated from Bath Spa University's MA in Writing for Young People in 2017.

== Writing ==
Her debut novel, The Middler, was published by Nosy Crow in 2019 and was shortlisted for the Waterstones Children's Book Prize and the UKLA Book Award. It was followed by Troofriend (2020) and The Life and Time of Lonnie Quicke (2021).

In 2022, she began a series of Princess Minna books for children aged 4+, with illustrator Sahar Haghgoo.

In 2023 Applebaum contributed a short story, Wolf Moon, to Read, Scream, Repeat, a collection of spooky mystery stories for children aged 9 - 12 from various authors.

== Published works ==
Title	Year	Publisher	Other information
The Middler	2019	Nosy Crow	
Troofriend	2020	Nosy Crow	
The Life and Time of Lonnie Quicke	2021	Nosy Crow	Released in US as Lifeling

=== Princess Minna series for younger readers ===
Title	Year	Publisher	Illustrations
The Unicorn Mix-Up	2022	Nosy Crow	Sahar Haghgoo
The Enchanted Forest	2022	Nosy Crow	Sahar Haghgoo
The Big Bad Snowy Day	2022	Nosy Crow	Sahar Haghgoo
The Best Princess	2023	Nosy Crow	Sahar Haghgoo
The Wicked Wood	2023	Nosy Crow	Sahar Haghgoo
The Giant Beanstalk	2024	Nosy Crow	Sahar Haghgoo
The Singing Sisters	2025	Nosy Crow	Sahar Haghgoo

=== Short stories ===
Title	Year	Publisher	From
Wolf Moon	2023	Farshore	Read, Scream, Repeat Various Authors (Compiled by Jennifer Killick)
