= Katherine Woodfine =

British children's author (born 1983)

Katherine Woodfine (born 1983) is a British children's author, known for The Sinclair's Mysteries series beginning with The Mystery of the Clockwork Sparrow.

== Biography ==
Katherine Woodfine was born in Lancashire in 1983. She studied English at Bristol University and in 2005 she was highly commended in Vogue magazine’s annual Talent Competition for young writers. Woodfine lives in London.

Woodfine's first job was working in Waterstones bookshop in Lancaster. She later managed a bookshop and gallery at Cornerhouse, Manchester’s international centre for visual arts and film, and worked for Arts Council England’s North West office, specialising in literature.

She spent six years working for Booktrust where she project-managed the Children's Laureateship and worked on other children's book prizes and initiatives, including YALC, the UK’s first Young Adult Literature Convention, curated by Malorie Blackman.

She now combines writing with other children's book projects, including the radio show and podcast Down the Rabbit Hole for Resonance FM, discussing children’s literature.

Woodfine writes a blog, Follow the Yellow.

She has contributed to Mystery & Mayhem by Egmont Books, published in May 2016 along with 11 other authors including Clementine Beauvais, Elen Caldecott, Susie Day, Julia Golding, Frances Hardinge, Caroline Lawrence, Helen Moss, Sally Nicholls, Kate Pankhurst, Robin Stevens and Harriet Whitehorn.

She has also contributed to Winter Magic curated by Abi Elphinstone, published in November 2016.

== Novels ==
- The Mystery of the Clockwork Sparrow. Egmont Books Ltd. 2015. ISBN 9781405276177.
- The Mystery of the Jewelled Moth. Egmont Books Ltd. 2016. ISBN 9781405276184.
- The Mystery of the Painted Dragon. Egmont Books Ltd. 2017. ISBN 9781405282895.
- The Midnight Peacock

Peril in Paris. Egmont Books

Spies in St Petersburg. Egmont Books

Villains in Venice. Egmont Books

Nightfall in New York. Farshore
