= Kristina Stephenson =

British author

Kristina Stephenson is a British author. She is best known for her children's stories, in particular her series Sir Charlie Stinky Socks published by Egmont Publishing and the Molly Maybe series, published by Simon & Schuster.

== Career ==
After school, Stephenson trained as a set and costume designer at the Central School of Art and Design. She worked for many years as a designer, writer and producer in the theatre and television, specialising in young children's programming for BBC and Channel 4, until she had her children. Wanting to stay at home with them she turned her hand to illustration. Inspired to write her first picture book by her son Charlie became an author.

== Works in the Sir Charlie Stinky Socks Series ==
1. Sir Charlie Stinkysocks And The Really Big Adventure: Oct 2007
2. Sir Charlie Stinky Socks and the Really Frightful Night: Oct 2008
3. Sir Charlie Stinky Socks and the Really Dreadful Spell Oct 2010
4. Sir Charlie Stinky Socks and the Tale of the Terrible Secret Nov 2011
5. Sir Charlie Stinky Socks and the Tale of the Two Treasures Oct 2012
6. Sir Charlie Stinky Socks and the Tale of the Wizard's Whisper Sep 2013
7. Sir Charlie Stinky Socks The Pirate's Curse Oct 2014 ISBN 9781405268103
8. Sir Charlie Stinky Socks The Mummy’s Gold 2016
9. Sir Charlie Stinky Socks The Dinosaur’s Return 2017
