= Annabel Pitcher =

British children's writer

Annabel Pitcher is a British children's writer.

== Background ==
Pitcher was born in a village in West Yorkshire. She studied English Literature at Oxford University. Her first novel, My Sister Lives on the Mantelpiece, deals with the tragedy of a family torn apart by a terrorist attack. It almost instantly became a bestseller and has been translated into over twenty languages. It was shortlisted for the Red House Children's Book Award, the Galaxy Children's Book of the Year, the 2012 Carnegie Medal, and the 2011 Dylan Thomas Prize. It won a Royal Society of Authors' Betty Trask Award, the Hull Children's Book of the Year and the prestigious 2012 Branford Boase Award for most outstanding debut novel. Her books appeal to the ages 10–15 mostly.

Pitcher's second novel, Ketchup Clouds, won the Waterstones Children's Book Prize. It also collected the Edgar Allan Poe award in 2014 for 'Best Young Adult Novel', awarded by the Mystery Writers of America.

Before her first book was published, Annabel trained as a teacher and taught English at Wakefield Girls' High School.

== Published books ==
Year	Title	Publisher	Awards
2011	My Sister Lives on the Mantelpiece	Orion Books	2012 Branford Boase Award
2012	Ketchup Clouds (US paperback title, Yours Truly)	Indigo/Orion	2013 Waterstones Children's Book Prize
2013	Project Bright Spark (illustrated by Roger Simó)	Collins Education	
March; 2015	Silence is Goldfish	Indigo/Orion	
