= Marie-Louise Jensen =

English children's author

- Born: Henley-on-Thames, England
- Education: University of East Anglia; University of Bath
- Occupation: Children's writer

Marie-Louise Jensen is an English children's author.

== Biography ==
Marie Louise Jensen (née Chalcraft) was born in Henley-On-Thames of an English father and Danish mother. Her early years were plagued by teachers telling her to get her head out of a book and learn useless things like maths. Marie-Louise studied Scandinavian and German with literature at the UEA and has lived in both Denmark and Germany. After teaching English at a German University for four years, she decided to return to England to care for her children full-time. she completed an MA in writing for Young people at the Bath Spa University in 2005. She reads, reviews and writes books for young people. She lives in Bath and home educates her two sons.

== Bibliography ==
- Between Two Seas (2008)
- The Lady in the Tower (2011)
- Daughter of Fire and Ice (2010)
- Sigrun's Secret (2011)
- The Girl in the Mask (2012)
- Smuggler's Kiss (2013)
- Runaway (2014)
- The Night Raider (2015)
- Sixth Formers (2016)

== Awards and nominations ==
- 2008 Between Two Seas shortlisted for the Waterstone's Children's Book Prize
- 2009 The Lady in the Tower shortlisted for the Waterstone's Children's Book Prize
