= A. M. Dassu =

English writer

A. M. Dassu is an English writer of fiction and non-fiction. In 2017, Dassu won the international We Need Diverse Books mentorship award. Her bestselling debut novel, was published in October 2020, and was shortlisted for the 2021 Waterstone's Children's Books Prize.

== Life ==
She was born and raised in England and has a mixed heritage originally from Iraq's Baghdad, India, Burma and Pakistan – her father was born in Tanzania.

In January 2021 she became one of The National Literacy Trust‘s Connecting Stories campaign's leading authors, aiming to help inspire a love of reading and writing in children and young people. Boy, Everywhere received a Kirkus Star in February 2021. Dassu's writing has been published by The Huffington Post, Times Educational Supplement, SCOOP Magazine, Lee & Low Books, and DK Books.

Dassu campaigns in support of refugees; she used the advance payments for Boy, Everywhere to help Syrian refugees in the UK. She also set up a We Need Diverse Books grant for supporting an unpublished refugee or immigrant writer. Dassu is patron of The Other Side Of Hope: Journeys in Refugee and Immigrant Literature, a literary magazine edited by immigrants and refugees which aims to celebrate refugee and immigrant communities around the world.

In addition to her work as a writer and campaigner, Dassu is also the deputy editor of SCBWI-BI's Words & Pictures magazine and a director at Inclusive Minds – a CIC that works towards greater inclusion, accessibility and more authentic representation of marginalised groups in books for young people.

== Bibliography ==
- Dassu, A. M. (2021). Boy, Everywhere. Lee & Low Books, Incorporated. ISBN 978-1-64379-196-8.
