= Michael Broad =

British children's writer

Michael Broad is a children's author. His latest series is Monsterbook, and Jake Cake and The Werewolf Teacher was shortlisted for the 2007 Waterstones Children's Book Prize.

== Selected bibliography ==
=== Monsterbook Series ===
- Pongdollop and the School Stink
- Snotgobble and the Bogey Bully
- Lumpydump and the Terror Teacher
- RumbleFART and the Beastly Bottom

=== Jake Cake Series ===
- The Football Beast
- The Pirate Curse
- The Robot Dinner Lady
- The School Dragon
- The Visiting Vampire
- The Werewolf Teacher

=== Agent Amelia Series ===
- Ghost Diamond!
- Zombie Cows!
- Hypno Hounds!
- Spooky Ballet!

=== Picture books ===
- Night flight to home
- Broken Bird
- The Little Star Who Wished
- Scaredy Cat and Boo
- Forget-Me-Not
- My Brilliant Book
- A visita do Vampiro
