= Michelle Harrison (writer) =

British author

- Born: Michelle Harrison; 21 December 1979 (age 46); Grays, Essex, England
- Occupation: Author
- Years active: 2007–present
- Known for: Children's fiction
- Notable work: The 13 Treasures
- Website: www.michelleharrisonbooks.com

Michelle Marie Harrison (born 21 December 1979) is a British writer whose debut novel, The Thirteen Treasures, won the Waterstone's Children's Book Prize and has been sold for translation in 17 countries. The 13 Treasures is the first part of a trilogy, which has continued with The 13 Curses and The 13 Secrets. Her fourth novel and first book for young adults is Unrest, a ghost story published by Simon & Schuster in 2012.

== Biography ==
Harrison was born and raised in Grays, Essex, England. After studying illustration at Staffordshire University, Harrison worked as a barmaid, in an art gallery, as a children's bookseller, and as an assistant editor for a children's book publisher. She now writes full-time and lives in Oxfordshire.

== Works and appearances ==
=== Bibliography ===
==== 13 Treasures series ====
- The Thirteen Treasures (2009)
- The Thirteen Curses (2010)
- The Thirteen Secrets (2011)
- One Wish (2014)

==== A Pinch of Magic series ====
- A Pinch of Magic (2019)
- A Sprinkle of Sorcery (2020)
- A Tangle of Spells (2021)
- A Storm of Sisters (2022)

==== Other novels ====
- Unrest (2012)
- The Other Alice (2016)

==== Anthologies ====
- Winter Magic (2017)
