= Ketchup Clouds =

2012 teen novel by Annabel Pitcher

- Author: Annabel Pitcher
- Language: English
- Genre: Young adult
- Publisher: Indigo division of Orion Publishing Group
- Publication date: 2012
- Publication place: United Kingdom
- ISBN: 9781780620305

Ketchup Clouds is a 2012 teen novel by Annabel Pitcher. It tells the story of a girl about the age of 15 who has a dark secret she is afraid to confess to anyone but her pen pal, a murderer on Death Row. It won the Waterstones Children's Book Prize.

== Synopsis ==
Ketchup Clouds is written in a series of letters from "Zoe", her chosen alias, who lives on fiction road in England to Mr. S Harris, a criminal on death row in America. Zoe initially starts writing to Mr. Harris specifically because she believes they must share the same guilt as, according to her view, they both killed a person they loved.

The events leading up to Zoe's "crime" begin around the end of the term before summer break. After her father receiving news that her grandfather is ill, tensions in her home begin to rise. For reasons unknown to Zoe, her mother seems to resent her grandfather and alludes to the idea that he is the reason why her sister, Dot, ended up ill and is currently deaf as a result. Zoe can say little to understand her mother's resentment towards him as she, Dot and her other sister, Soph have not seen him in years. Regardless, Zoe's sole mission is to make it to Max Morgan's end of term party.

At the party she meets a 'boy [...] brown eyes [and] messy blond hair' whom she feels she has chemistry with and in which she engages in sexual activity with Max Morgan and later on, a relationship. She soon finds out that the brown-eyed boy, Aaron, is Max's brother and unbeknown to Max, there are still feelings between them. It is the accident that follows after he discovers Zoe and Aaron together that lead her to identify both with Mr Harris as a murderer and his unfaithful wife whom she calls a "scarlet woman" and believes she deserved her death.
