= Huw Aaron =

Welsh cartoonist and author (born 1980)

- Born: 22 October 1980 (age 45); Swansea, Wales, United Kingdom
- Notable work: Sleep Tight, Disgusting Blob

Huw Aaron (born 1980) is a cartoonist, illustrator, and children's author. He was born in Swansea, but subsequently settled in Cardiff.

== Career ==
After a short period as a chartered accountant, Aaron began working as a freelance cartoonist in 2009. He has regularly contributed cartoons to Private Eye, Reader's Digest, The Oldie, Prospect, The New Statesman, The Spectator, and The Rugby Paper, for whose cartoon, North Stand, Aaron was highly commended in the 2012 British Sports Journalism Awards.

Aaron has written and illustrated a number of children's books, predominantly in Welsh. He was chosen by the Books Council of Wales to write the £1 Welsh language book for World Book Day in 2021. Together with his wife, Luned Aaron, he won both the Tir na n-Og Award (Welsh language primary category) and the Wales Book of the Year (Children & Young People Award) in 2023 for Dwi Eisiau bod yn Ddeinosor.

In 2024, Aaron signed a seven-book deal with Puffin Books, the first of which, Sleep Tight, Disgusting Blob, was published in March 2025.

In 2026, Aaron had two works, Sleep Tight, Disgusting Blob, and Unfairies, nominated in the Waterstones Children's Book Prize shortlist, an unprecedented achievement. Sleep Tight Disgusting Blob went on to win both the Younger Reader category and the overall prize.

== Selected works ==
- Ha Ha Cnec (2021)
- I Want To Be A Dinosaur (Welsh: Dwi Eisiau Bod yn Ddeinosor) (with Luned Aaron) (2022)
- Sleep Tight, Disgusting Blob (2025)
- Unfairies (2025)
- Monkeypig (2026)
- Unfairies: Death by Toad (2026)
