= Hannah Gold =

British children's author

Hannah Gold is a British children's literature author who writes stories with nature themes. Her first book is called The Last Bear which is now a bestselling book.

Gold worked in film and magazines before becoming a full-time writer.

The Last Bear won the 2022 Waterstones Children's Book Prize. The Times called it "a stunning debut of a writer to watch". It also won the Blue Peter Book Award for Best Story in 2022 and has been translated into 27 languages around the world. Her second book, The Lost Whale, won the Edward Stanford Travel Writing Award in 2023.

Turtle Moon (2023) is set in a wildlife sanctuary threatened by the poaching industry and covers themes of animal/human relationships and care for the environment. The Lone Husky is set in the universe of The Last Bear and Finding Bear and is due for release in October 2025. All her books are illustrated by Levi Pinfold.

She is an ambassador for Whale and Dolphin Conservation.

== Publications ==
- The Last Bear, HarperCollins, 2021, illustrated by Levi Pinfold
- The Lost Whale, HarperCollins, 2022, illustrated by Levi Pinfold
- Finding Bear, HarperCollins, 2023, illustrated by Levi Pinfold
- Turtle Moon, HarperCollins, 2024, illustrated by Levi Pinfold
- The Lone Husky, HarperCollins, 2025, illustrated by Levi Pinfold
- Bear Rescue, HarperCollins, 2026, illustrated by Levi Pinfold
