= The Sinclair's Mysteries =

Children's novels by Katherine Woodfine

- Author: Katherine Woodfine
- Language: English
- Genre: Children's books, mysteries
- Publisher: Egmont Publishing
- Publication place: United Kingdom
- Media type: Print

The Sinclair's Mysteries is a quartet of children's historical mysteries from author Katherine Woodfine. The first book, The Mystery of the Clockwork Sparrow, was published in June 2015. It was a Waterstones Book of the Month. The sequel, The Mystery of the Jewelled Moth, was published in February 2016; the third instalment, The Mystery of the Painted Dragon, was published in February 2017, with the fourth and final instalment The Midnight Peacock published in October 2017.

Each of the novels is set in Edwardian London and revolves around the fictional department store, Sinclair's. Sinclair's is an establishment very much like Selfridge's, catering to London's rich, offering high fashion, perfumes and sweets. The series heroines Lilian Rose and Sophie Taylor, accompanied by friends Billy Parker and Joe, are employed on the shop floor and frequently find themselves privy to criminal goings-on.

== Novels ==
=== The Mystery of the Clockwork Sparrow ===
Left penniless when her father dies, Sophie is pleased to find a job in the millinery department of Sinclair's, soon to be London's largest and most glamorous department store. There, she makes friends with mystery-loving Billy, a junior porter; beautiful Lil, who is one of the department store “mannequins” by day and an aspiring actress by night; and Joe, a shady runaway from the Baron’s Boys, a gang of criminals.

Just before the store is due to open, there is a daring burglary, including the theft of the priceless Clockwork Sparrow. When Sophie herself becomes a suspect, the only solution is to solve the mystery of the Clockwork Sparrow. Her friends Lil, Billy, and Joe help her to solve the crime.

=== The Mystery of the Jeweled Moth ===
In The Mystery of the Jeweled Moth, Sophie and Lil are confronted with another puzzling case. When debutante Veronica Whitley’s priceless brooch goes missing, it is up to Sophie and Lil to save the day. Readers will gasp as the two young heroines go undercover, uncover secret rooms, and of course reveal hidden identities.

=== The Mystery of the Painted Dragon ===
In this story, we see a young budding artist called Leonora Fitzgerald, or Leo for short, who goes to an art school in London. Whilst in London, a priceless painting gets stolen after she is told by Randolf Lyle to recreate it. Leo's friends and fellow artists include: Connie, who is involved with the suffragette movement, and Jonathan "Jack" Rose, who is Lil's brother. Together, they find out who is behind everything, with the help of Sophie and Lil, of course!

=== The Midnight Peacock ===
In The Midnight Peacock, Sophie and Lil find themselves trying to solve a Christmas mystery at a party in snowy Winter Hall. Back in London, Mr Sinclair's New Year's Eve Midnight Peacock Ball might just spell disaster for the young detectives and their friends.

== Characters ==
Sophie Taylor – Sophie was left orphaned at a younger age. Unaware of her passion for solving mysteries, Sophie begins work at the lavish Sinclair’s, where she finds many new friends.

Lil (Lilian) Rose – Sophie's best friend, Lil, aspires to be an actress against her wealthy parents' wishes. She works as a model at Sinclair's. She is outgoing, confident, and naturally inquisitive. In the Mystery of the Painted Dragon, it is found out that she has a brother Jonathan, or "Jack".

Billy Parker – Billy is one of the junior porters at Sinclair's. He becomes good friends with Sophie, Lil, and Joe. He is also aspiring to be like his hero Montgomery Baxter.

Mei Lim- in book two, the friends meet Mei, a young girl from China town. Mei soon becomes a trustworthy friend of all four of the mystery solving gang. Mei's father is Chinese and her mother is British. They own a small shop in China town which becomes a second home for Sophie and Lil.

Mr Cooper – the manager of Sinclair's. Stern and elegant, he was never suspected to be anything other than his outward appearance. However, he is discovered to be in league with the Baron.

Leonora Fitzgerald - the youngest daughter of Lady Lucy Fitzgerald. She is a promising art student at the art school the Spencers. At young age, Leo was afflicted with an illness such took away her ability to walk, however, Leo was determined to walk again. And so, with help of her crutch, she slowly regains the ability to walk.

Veronica Whiteley - the daughter of a wealthy mine owner. She's a debutante who was going to be engaged with Lord Beaucastle, an aristocratic gentleman, who is later revealed to be the Baron.

John Hardcastle - in the Midnight Peacock, he is revealed to be the Baron. He's the disgraced youngest son of the duke of Cleveland.

Edward Sinclair - on the surface, a millionaire later to be revealed to be in fact a spy sent by America to investigate Fraternitas Draconum - the Brotherhood of Dragons.

Joe - after running away from the Baron’s Boys, a rowdy East End gang, Joe meets Sophie, Lil, and Billy who help him out of his tangled life, and give him a chance to have a fresh start. Like Sophie, Joe has no family, but he soon finds that Billy, Sophie, and Lil are the best family he could have. He develops feelings towards Lil as the series progresses.

Jack (Jonathan) Rose - Lil’s older brother who is also studying at the Spencer, he is one of Leo's best friends.

Mr Pendleton, Mr Devereux, Phyllis Woodhouse, and Other Debutantes - friends of Sophie, Lil, and Veronica Whiteley who help on their adventures.

Mr McDermott - a detective who assists Sophie and Lil.
