= Pari Thomson =

English children's author and editor (born 1991)

- Born: 1991 (age 34–35)
- Education: University of Oxford
- Years active: 2016–present

Pari Thomson (born 1991) is an English children's author and editor at Bloomsbury Children's Books. Her debut book Greenwild: The World Behind the Door, the first in a series, won the overall Waterstones Children's Book Prize.

== Early life ==
Thomson is half-English, half-Iranian and moved around growing up. Thomson graduated with a Bachelor of Arts (BA) in English in 2013 and a Masters in 2014, both from the University of Oxford.

== Career ==
Thomson began her career selling books at Waterstones before joining Bloomsbury Children's Books in 2016, where she became Commissioning Editor.

In 2022, Macmillan Children's Books acquired the rights to publish Thomson's debut botanical fantasy book series, starting with Greenwild: The World Behind the Door in 2023. Greenwild: The World Behind the Door was named a Sunday Times Children's Book of the Week by Lucy Bannerman, won the overall Waterstones Children's Book Prize as well as the Prize in the Younger Fiction category, and shortlisted for Blackwell's Book of the Year and a Books Are My Bag Readers' Award. This was followed by sequels Greenwild: The City Beyond the Sea in 2024 and Greenwild: The Forest in the Sky in 2025.

== Personal life ==
Thomson lives near Kew Gardens.

== Bibliography ==
=== Greenwild ===
- Greenwild: The World Behind the Door (2023)
- Greenwild: The City Beyond the Sea (2024)
- Greenwild: The Forest in the Sky (2025)
