= Boy 87 =

British historical fiction novel

- First edition
- Author: Ele Fountain
- Language: English
- Genre: Historical Fiction
- Publisher: Little Brown
- Publication date: 2018
- Publication place: United Kingdom
- Media type: Print (hardcover)
- Pages: 247 pp
- ISBN: 978-0-316-42303-8
- OCLC: 4975337702

Boy 87 (Refugee 87) is a contemporary novel by Ele Fountain. The refugee crisis is one of the themes in this novel. It is published by Pushkin Children's Books in the UK and by Little Brown in the US (as Refugee 87). The book was written while the author was living in Ethiopia.

== Plot summary ==
Boy 87 starts with a boy named Shif. It begins in an unnamed dictatorship. It's a day like any other for Shif and his best friend, 'Bini'. They are at school. Shif reflects on what they want to do when they grow up and finish their military service for the country. They are both exceedingly smart; they skipped multiple grades and are about to begin military school early.

After a few days, soldiers show up around the school, scouting for any children trying to evade military service. Shif discovers that his mother has lied to him about his father. She told Shif when he was younger that his father had died in hospital but in fact he was sent to prison.

Soon after, Shif sees the soldiers near his home. When one soldier confronts him, Shif runs away back home. Things begin to escalate when Bini doesn't arrive at school the next day, then when Shif arrives home his mother tells him he has to leave without her or his sister. The government is after him. Shif packs everything he needs to take with him. Soldiers enter his home and search for evidence that he plans to leave. They find the packed bag. Shif and Bini are put on a truck which takes them to a prison.

They are scared and exhausted because the truck takes a full day to reach the prison where cargo containers are used to imprison 'traitors'. They are thrown into the same container along with other prisoners, some of whom have been there for over a decade. Shif and Bini are confused, exhausted and thirsty. The prisoners explain the rules and how things work. They are allowed to exercise for ten minutes a day. The container becomes freezing at night and very hot during the day. They are given hardly any food or water. One of the other prisoners, Yonas, explains that they have an escape plan for them, as they are young and healthy compared to the other prisoners and might succeed. They could then tell the outside world about the situation in the country. Yonas also reveals that Shif's father may still be alive; they were sent to the same prison a few years ago.

Shif and Bini launch the escape plan. They make a run for it but are chased by the guards. Shif escapes as Bini hold the soldiers off, getting killed in the process. Shif decides he must try to make it north towards the Mediterranean Sea to escape to Italy and wait for his family there. He meets Almaz's family where they move towards the North in a desperate attempt to survive.

== Characters ==
Shif (Shiferwa Gebreselassie): The main character of the story, a very smart kid who was unlucky enough to have a father who was a teacher that opposed the government and wanted more pay. His best friend is 'Bini'. The story is focused mainly on him. He has a little sister named Lemlem, and of course a mother who cares for him but also doesn't tell him the news about his father being alive.

Bini: The main character's friend, is also very smart (maybe even smarter than Shif). His mother's name is Saba.

Yonas: The character who helps out Shif and Bini escape the prison. He is old and has been in the prison for years.

Lemlem: Shif's sister. Not much is known about her but she is young and likes colourful things.

Almaz: Shif's new friend after leaving his home country. Almaz also comes from Shif's home country along with her family. Her mother's name is Shewit and her father is Mesfin. She has a brother but got taken by the military.

== Reception ==
Kirkus Reviews called Boy 87 "A suspenseful debut novel about the forces of greed and love that shape a refugee's fate.", and a BookTrust review described it as ".. a timely and important book which illuminates the realities of life as a refugee."

Boy 87 has also been reviewed by Publishers Weekly, The Bulletin of the Center for Children's Books, The Sunday Times, and The Guardian.

== Awards ==
Boy 87 has won, been shortlisted, for British book awards including the 2019 Southwark Book Award (winner), the 2019 Waterstones Children's Book Prize for older readers (shortlisted), the 2018 Northeast Book Award (shortlisted), the 2019 Portsmouth Book Award Longer Novel (winner), the 2019 Sheffield Children's Book Award Longer Novel (winner), the 2019 Teach Primary Key Stage 2 Book Award (shortlist), the 2019 Warwickshire Secondary Book Award (shortlist), the 2019 Sefton Super Reads Award (winner), the 2019 North Herts Schools’ Book Award in the Younger category (shortlisted), and the 2019 Redbridge Children's Teenage Book Award (longlist).

Boy 87 was also longlisted for the 2019 UKLA (Ages 7–11) Book Award.
