= Open Very Carefully =

Children's picture book by Nick Bromley and Nicola O'Byrne

Open Very Carefully: A Book With Bite!
- Author: Nick Bromley
- Illustrator: Nicola O'Byrne
- Cover artist: O'Byrne
- Language: English
- Genre: Children's picture book
- Published: 2013 (Nosy Crow)
- Publication place: England
- Media type: Print (hardback)
- Pages: 29 (unpaginated)
- ISBN: 9780857630476
- OCLC: 842839196

Open Very Carefully: A Book With Bite! is a 2013 children's picture book by Nick Bromley and illustrated by Nicola O'Byrne. It is about a crocodile that disrupts a narrator's reading of The Ugly Duckling.

== Reception ==
A review in Publishers Weekly of Open Very Carefully wrote "This is a lively read with many prompts for interactivity and a format that makes it a good choice for both lap reads and preschool circle time ...", while Kirkus Reviews called it "A blandly nonthreatening alternative to Emily Gravett’s Wolves (2006) and like encounters with metafictional characters."

Open Very Carefully has also been reviewed by Booklist, School Library Journal, Horn Book Guides, and Booktrust.

Some teachers have been concerned that it reinforces stereotypes.

Open Very Carefully won the 2014 Waterstones Children's Book Prize for picture books, was shortlisted for the 2014 UKLA Book Award in the 3 to 6 category, shortlisted for the 2014 Oscar's Book Prize, and longlisted for the 2014 Kate Greenaway Medal.

It appears on the 2015 North Somerset Teachers' Book Award Booklist.
