= TIM Defender of the Earth =

2008 young adult science fiction novel by Sam Enthoven

TIM, Defender of the Earth
- Author: Sam Enthoven
- Language: English
- Genre: Young adult, Science fiction
- Publisher: Doubleday
- Publication date: January 17, 2008
- Publication place: United Kingdom
- Media type: Print (Hardback & Paperback)
- Pages: 304
- ISBN: 978-0-385-60968-5
- OCLC: 181422338

TIM, Defender of the Earth is a 2008 young adult science fiction novel by Sam Enthoven, written in the spirit of classic monster movies such as Godzilla and Gamera. It was shortlisted for the Waterstone's Children's Book Prize.

== Plot summary ==
The story begins with the newly appointed Prime Minister, Mr Sinclair, being taken by Dr Mckienzy to a top-secret underground lab. There he views TIM (Tyrannosaur Improved Module) sleeping in a giant tank. Mckienzy explains that the military have been developing hybrids to fight their wars, but all except Tim have died. Mr Sinclair tells her that he considers her experiment a failure and instructs her to close it down and euthanize Tim.

Meanwhile, a class visits the British Museum. Chris meets a security guard, who shows him a strange bracelet, which glows when Chris goes near it. The guard clamps it on his wrist and tells him that he is now joined to the Defender of the Earth.

Dr Mckienzy floods Tim's enclosure with gas, to poison him. Tim breaks out and rampages over London, scared and confused by the world that he finds himself in. He blocks London Bridge, which Chris and his parents are driving over. As he gets close to Tim, Chris's bracelet starts glowing, and Tim suddenly feels peaceful. He trots into the Thames and wades off. Swimming in the sea, Tim runs into the Kraken, who informs him that he is going to be the 'Defender of the Earth'.

The next morning, Anna's father, Professor Mallahide, is giving a demonstration to an audience that includes the head of the army and Mr Sinclair. He reveals to them that he has created a swarm of nanobots for the military. His audience is unimpressed when he demonstrates by changing a squirrel from grey to red, but when his nanobots eat the squirrel alive on his orders, increasing the swarm, they give him permission to continue his work. Once they have departed, Mallahide restores the squirrel to full health, calling the prime minister and his friends morons.

Chris returns to the museum to ask the guard that gave him the bracelet to remove it. When he learns that the guard has no way of doing that, he stalks off.

Mallahide orders his machines to devour him and make him one with the swarm. Just as he is almost gone, he thinks of Anna and regrets his decision. Then he is completely eaten and the experiment appears to have failed.

Anna waits in her family's flat for Mallahide. He does not appear, and at 11 o'clock, his work rings to tell her that there was an accident at the lab, and her father has died. She is lying in bed, with a counselor sent over by the government sleeping on the sofa, when her father turns up. She begins to argue with him. The noise in her room wakes the counselor, who comes up the stairs. Mallahide hears her coming, and disappears into thin air.

== Critical reception ==
Kirkus Reviews found Tim disappointing despite its promising concept, citing its inadequate character development and confusing story structure. In Booklist, John Peters wrote that the novel should appeal to fans of M. T. Anderson's Whales on Stilts, although it does not match the latter in terms of "sheer zaniness". In The Bulletin of the Center for Children's Books, Elizabeth Bush cautioned that while the novel may satisfy those looking for "light and cheesy entertainment", readers looking for more sophisticated and "hardcore" science-fiction will be disappointed.

Other reviews were more positive. Paula Rohrlick's review in Kliatt called Tim "[f]un escapist fantasy", noting that it contains more humour and less horror compared to Enthoven's previous novel The Black Tattoo. Jane Henriksen Baird's review in School Library Journal concluded: "This fun, action-driven, science fiction tale will be snapped up by restless boys who can never find books written just for them."
