= Ed Vere =

British writer and illustrator

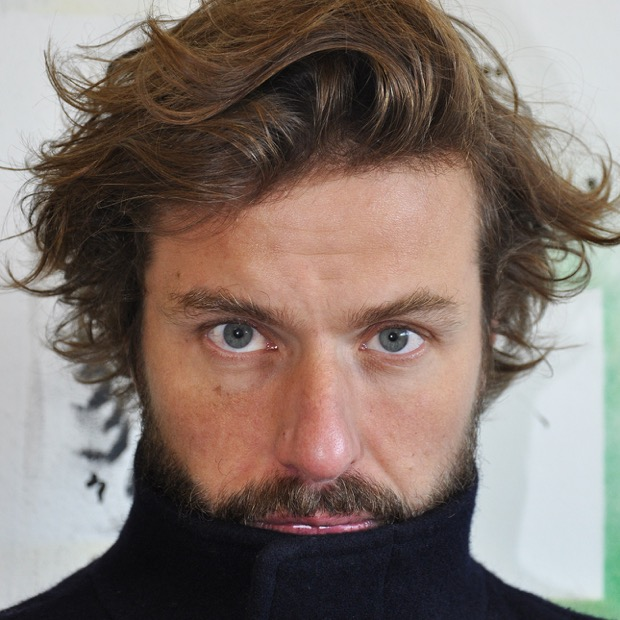
- Ed Vere
- Born: London, United Kingdom
- Occupations: Illustrator, author
- Writing career
- Period: 1999–present
- Genre: Children's picture books
- Notable works: The Getaway; Banana; Mr. Big; Bedtime for Monsters; Max the Brave; Max at Night; How to Be a Lion
- Notable awards: Oscar's Book Prize 2019 Book Trust Early Years Award 2009 Highland Children's Book Award 2007
- Website: Official website

Ed Vere is a British writer and illustrator of children's books. He won the Highland Children's Book Award in 2007 for his book, The Getaway and was shortlisted for the Kate Greenaway Medal for children's book illustration, recognizing his 2008 picture book Banana. His third book, Mr. Big was chosen by Booktrust as the official Booktime book for 2009 and was subsequently distributed to 750,000 British schoolchildren making it the largest single print run of a picture book in the UK. In 2009, his fourth book, Chick won the Booktrust Early Years Award for Best Baby Book. His book Bedtime for Monsters was shortlisted for the 2011 Roald Dahl Funny Prize. His 2018 book, How to Be a Lion, was nominated for the 2019 Kate Greenaway Medal and the 2019 Carnegie Medal.

== Education ==
Vere studied fine art at Camberwell College of Art in London.

Vere is the 2020 Illustrator in Residence for Booktrust. While there he will champion drawing in primary education and attempt to start a national conversation about the benefits of drawing for mental health.

== Born Free Foundation - Artist in Residence ==
Vere travelled to Kenya in early 2019 to explore, paint and write about Born Free’s work. Writing about and painting lions, their natural habitats and the local populations they live alongside. Discovering the work Born Free does to ensure that the world's remaining 20000 wild lions have a secure and sustainable future. Ed and Born Free will be publishing a book in 2022. There will also be an exhibition and fund-raising auction.

Vere describes the book as 'a painted and written travelogue, a journey of discovery, it aims to engender a love of nature in a world increasingly disconnected from it. The book will discuss issues around freedom, conservation and what we can do to create a world in which wildlife thrives, rather than perishes.' The book aims to properly discuss the issues at hand and consequently is aimed at a wide-ranging audience from 8 year-old to adult.

== Concerts ==
Vere has worked with the Britten Sinfonia and the Neil Cowley Trio to stage live concerts for schools and family audiences. With the Britten Sinfonia, adaptations of Mr Big and Max the Brave have been staged in concerts which bring together live drawing and classical music, the most recent at The Barbican Centre. The concerts were devised with and presented by Hannah Conway.

Vere staged 'Mr Big plays Jazz' at Wigmore Hall, London & Birmingham Symphony & Town Halls with the Neil Cowley Trio.

== Other activities ==
Vere worked with CLPE to co-create the Power of Pictures, a 12-week scheme in which author/illustrators teach teachers about writing techniques.

At the outset of the coronavirus pandemic in 2020, Vere started creating step-by-step ‘how to draw’ videos for a home-schooling audience. These videos are free to use and available on his website.

== Books written and illustrated ==
- The Getaway, by Ed Vere (Puffin, June 2007) ISBN 9780141500584
- Banana, by Ed Vere (Puffin, August 2007) ISBN 978-0141500591
- Mr. Big, by Ed Vere (Puffin, July 2008) ISBN 978-0141500607
- Chick, by Ed Vere (Puffin, March 2009) ISBN 978-0141384863
- Bedtime for Monsters, by Ed Vere (Puffin, July 2011) ISBN 978-0141502397
- Max the Brave, by Ed Vere (Puffin, June 2014) ISBN 978-0723286691
- Max at Night, by Ed Vere (Puffin, Sept. 2015) ISBN 978-0723294573
- Max and Bird, by Ed Vere (Puffin, June 2016)
- How to Be a Lion, by Ed Vere (Penguin Random House, June 2018) Nominated for the 2019 Kate Greenaway Medal and the 2019 Carnegie Medal
