= My Sister Lives on the Mantelpiece =

2011 novel by Annabel Pitcher

First edition (publ. Orion Books)

My Sister Lives On The Mantelpiece is a 2011 novel written by Annabel Pitcher. It won the 2012 Branford Boase Award, and received at least 25 other award nominations.

== Plot summary ==
Ten-year-old Jamie Mathews moves to the Lake District from London with his 15-year-old sister Jasmine and alcoholic father after their mother has an affair and leaves them. Jasmine's twin sister, Rose, was killed on September 9 in the London Bombings five years earlier - her ashes remain in an urn on the mantelpiece. Jasmine and their parents have been deeply troubled by Rose's death, yet Jamie was too young to remember Rose and thus remains mostly unaffected. At his new Church of England school, Jamie befriends a Muslim girl named Sunya. Jamie's father has developed a Islamophobic belief following Rose's death, which he blames on the entire Muslim population. Knowing his father would not approve, Jamie struggles to keep his friendship with Sunya a secret from him while also trying to make sense of the tragedy that has permanently changed his family.

== Critical reception ==
Critic Philip Ardagh of The Guardian succinctly headlined: "The fact that this is Pitcher's first foray into fiction is gob-smacking. It's a wonderful piece of writing."
