= Jim Smith (author) =

English author, illustrator and designer

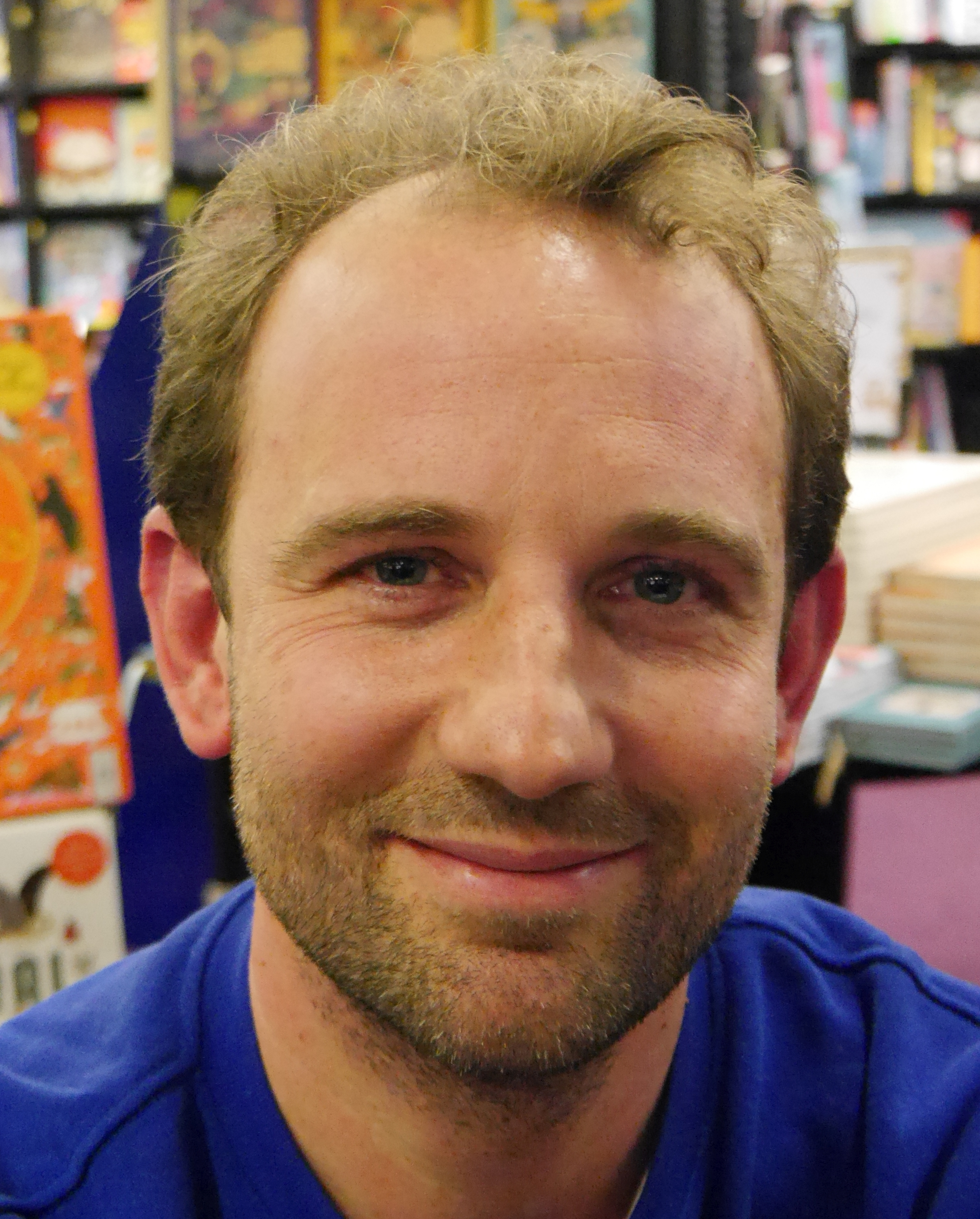
- Jim Smith, Waterstones, Piccadilly, London, December 2018
- Born: 1975 (age 49–50); London, England
- Occupation(s): Author, illustrator, designer
- Awards: Roald Dahl Funny Prize 2013; The Laugh Out Loud Children's Book Awards 2017
- Website: waldopancake.com/about/

Jim Smith is a British author, illustrator and designer who is behind the gift and card range, Waldo Pancake, Head of Design for franchise chain Puccino Coffee as well as creator of the award-winning children's series Barry Loser. I Am Still Not a Loser, Smith's second book in the Barry Loser Series, won the Roald Dahl Funny Prize in 2013 for funniest book for children aged 7–14. And the second book in the spin-off series Future Ratboy won The Laugh Out Loud Children's Book Awards in 2017 for 6–8-year olds.

== Novels ==
=== Barry Loser ===
- —— (2012). Barry Loser: I Am Not a Loser. Egmont Books Ltd. ISBN 9781405260312.
- —— (2013). Barry Loser: I Am Still Not a Loser. Egmont Books Ltd. ISBN 9781405260329.
- —— (2013). Barry Loser: I Am So Over Being a Loser. Egmont Books Ltd. ISBN 9781405260336.
- —— (2014). Barry Loser: I Am Nit a Loser (World Book Day ed.). Egmont Books Ltd. ISBN 9781405271172.
- —— (2014). Barry Loser: I Am Sort of a Loser. Egmont Books Ltd. ISBN 9781405268011.
- —— (2014). Barry Loser and the Holiday of Doom. Egmont Books Ltd. ISBN 9781405268028.
- —— (2015). Barry Loser and the Case of the Crumpled Carton. Egmont Books Ltd. ISBN 9781405268035.
- —— (2016). Barry Loser Hates Half Term. Egmont Books Ltd. ISBN 9781405269148.
- —— (2017). Barry Loser and the Birthday Billions. Egmont Books Ltd.
- —— (2017). Barry Loser: Worst School Trip Ever!. Egmont Books Ltd.
- —— (2018). Barry Loser Is the Best at Football NOT!. Egmont Books Ltd.
- —— (2019). Barry Loser and the Trouble with Pets. Egmont Books Ltd.

Collection / ominibus

- —— (2015). Barry Loser's Ultimate Book of Keelness. Egmont Books Ltd. ISBN 9781405275927.

=== F Ratboy ===
- —— (2015). Future Ratboy and the Attack of the Killer Robot Grannies. Egmont Books Ltd. ISBN 9781405269131.
- —— (2016). Future Ratboy and the Invasion of the Nom Noms. Egmont Books Ltd. ISBN 9781405269155.
