= Rob Biddulph =

British children's author, illustrator (born 1972)

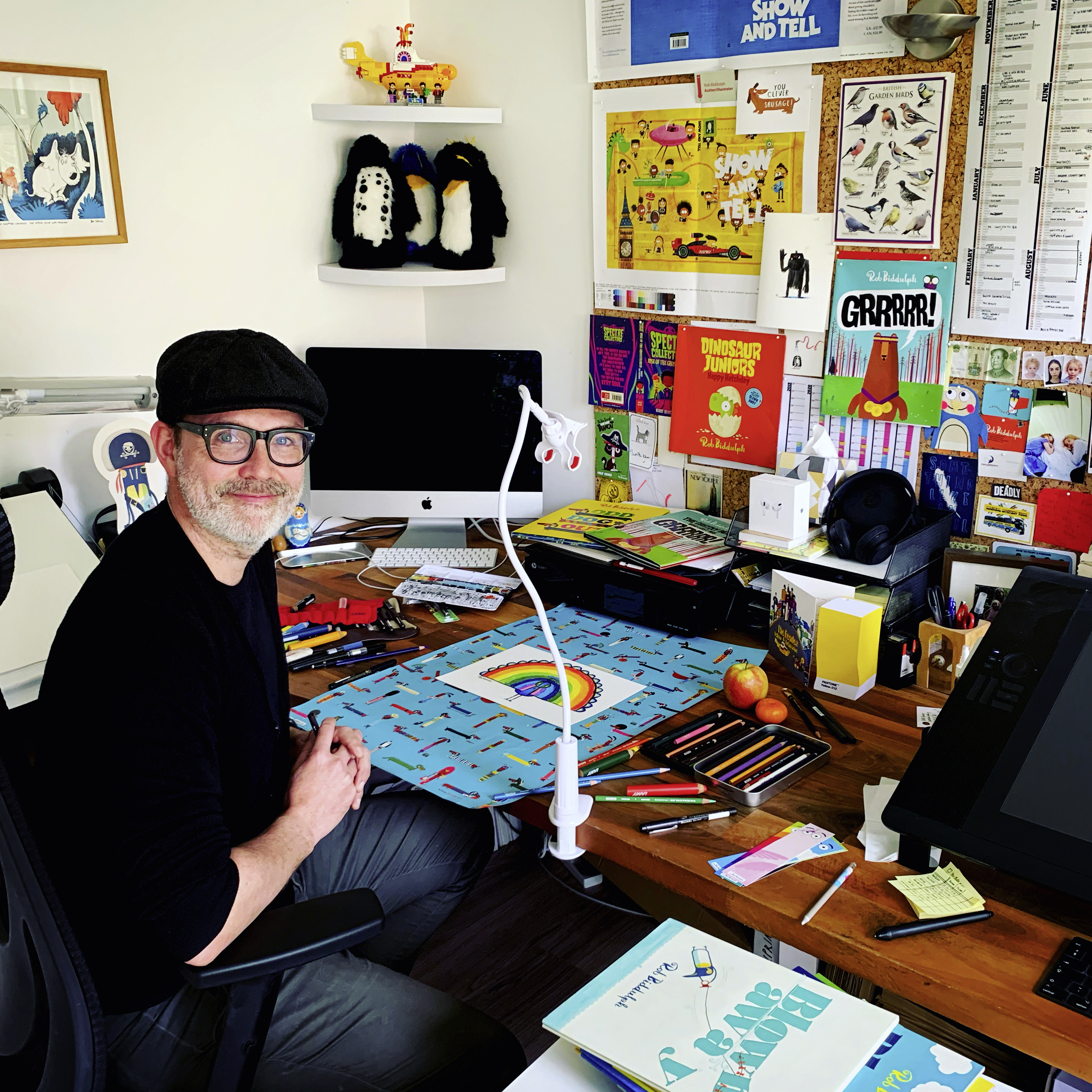
- Biddulph in his studio, 2020
- Born: 12 October 1972 (age 54); London, England
- Education: Middlesex University
- Occupations: Author; illustrator
- Spouse: Ally Oliver (m. 2006)
- Children: 3
- Writing career
- Genre: Children's books
- Notable works: Draw with Rob; Blown Away; Odd Dog Out; The Peanut Jones trilogy
- Website: robbiddulph.com

Rob Biddulph is a British children's author and illustrator.

== Early life ==
Biddulph was born on 12 October 1972 in Barnet, London. He attended Dame Alice Owen's School. He graduated with a BA(Hons) degree in Visual Communication and Design from Middlesex University in 1994.

== Career ==
Before becoming an author and illustrator, he worked as an art director for The Observer Magazine, NME, Uncut, SKY Magazine and Just Seventeen.

In 2014, he published his first picture book, Blown Away, about an intrepid blue penguin. In 2015, he won the Waterstones Children's Book Prize for Blown Away, which was the second picture book to win the prize.

Several of his picture books have featured on the BBC television series CBeebies Bedtime Stories. Odd Dog Out was read by Tom Hardy in 2017, Blown Away was read by Mark Bonnar in 2017, GRRRRR! was read by Chris Kamara in 2019, Show and Tell was read by Rick Astley in 2019, An Odd Dog Christmas was read by Hardy in 2021, and Gigantic was read by Cody Rhodes in 2025.

In 2021, he published his first middle-grade book, Peanut Jones and the Illustrated City and his fourth, The Last Wolf, was the Waterstones Children's Book of the Month in October 2026.

Biddulph was the official World Book Day illustrator between 2019 and 2021 and was named Illustrator of the Year at the British Book Awards (the Nibbies) in May 2025.

== Draw with Rob ==
In March 2020, Biddulph began uploading twice-weekly draw-along videos to help children looking for things to keep them occupied whilst stuck at home during the COVID-19 pandemic. The videos received millions of views worldwide, and on 20 May 2020 Biddulph broke the Guinness World Record for the largest ever online art class when 45,611 households joined him in drawing a blue whale via his YouTube channel. In the process, over £50,000 was raised for charity. Biddulph was named as a UK Point of Light by Boris Johnson, the Prime Minister, who said "As our country observed the toughest restrictions in living memory, you inspired the creative spirit of the nation with millions of families tuning in to your #DrawWithRob series and spending special time together honing their artistic skills."

== Publications ==
- Blown Away, 2014
- GRRRRR!, 2015
- Odd Dog Out, 2016
- Sunk!, 2017
- Kevin, 2017
- Dinosaur Juniors: Happy Hatchday, 2018
- Dinosaur Juniors: Give Peas a Chance, 2018
- Dinosaur Juniors: Wide Awake, 2019
- Show and Tell, 2019
- Dog Gone, 2020
- An Odd Dog Christmas, 2021
- The Blue-footed Booby, 2022
- Gigantic, 2023
- Charlie McGrew & the Horse That He Drew, 2024
- I Follow the Fox, 2024
- When I Grow Up I'd Like to Be..., 2025
- South, 2026
- Peanut Jones and the Illustrated City, 2021
- Peanut Jones and the Twelve Portals, 2022
- Peanut Jones and the End of the Rainbow, 2023
- The Last Wolf, 2026
- The Draw with Rob series, 2020–
- The My First Draw with Rob series, 2023–

== Collaborations ==
- The Flat Stanley series, 2017–2018, written by Jeff Brown
- The Radio Boy series, 2017–2018, written by Christian O'Connell
- The Adventures of Parsley the Lion, 2020, written by Michael Bond
- The Super Miraculous Journey of Freddie Yates, 2020, written by Jenny Pearson
- The Furry Purry Beancat series, 2020, written by Philip Ardagh

== Awards and recognitions ==
- 2015: Waterstones Children's Book Prize, winner (Blown Away)
- 2015: Waterstones Children's Book Prize, Best Illustrated Book, winner (Blown Away)
- 2015: Kate Greenaway Medal, nominated (Blown Away)
- 2015: Independent Booksellers Book Award, shortlisted (Blown Away)
- 2016: Kate Greenaway Medal, nominated (GRRRRR!)
- 2016: Independent Booksellers Book Award, shortlisted (GRRRRR!)
- 2017: UKLA Student Shadower's Book Award, winner (Odd Dog Out)
- 2017: BSC Festival of Literature Picture Book Award, winner (Odd Dog Out)
- 2017: Oscar's Book Prize, shortlisted (Odd Dog Out)
- 2017: Independent Booksellers Book Award, shortlisted (Odd Dog Out)
- 2017: Sheffield Children's Book Award, shortlisted (Odd Dog Out)
- 2018: Kate Greenaway Medal, nominated (Sunk!)
- 2018: Oscar's Book Prize, shortlisted (Sunk!)
- 2018: The People's Book Prize, shortlisted (Sunk!)
- 2018: Kate Greenaway Medal, nominated (Kevin)
- 2018: BSC Festival of Literature Picture Book Award, shortlisted (Kevin)
- 2018: Independent Booksellers Book Award, shortlisted (Kevin)
- 2018: Junior Magazine Design Awards, Gold, winner (Dinosaur Juniors: Happy Hatchday)
- 2019: Kate Greenaway Medal, nominated (Dinosaur Juniors: Give Peas a Chance)
- 2019: BSC Festival of Literature Picture Book Award, shortlisted (Show and Tell)
- 2020: UK Point of Light, winner
- 2020: Sainsbury's Children's Book Award, winner (Draw With Rob)
- 2020: Sheffield Children's Book Award, winner (Show and Tell)
- 2021: British Book Awards, shortlisted (Draw With Rob)
- 2021: BSC Festival of Literature Picture Book Award, shortlisted (Dog Gone)
- 2022: Yoto Carnegie Illustration Medal, nominated (The Blue-footed Booby)
- 2023: Fantastic Book Award, Lancashire School Library Service, winner (Peanut Jones and the Illustrated City)
- 2023: FCBG Children's Book Award, nominated (The Blue-Footed Booby)
- 2023: BSC Festival of Literature Picture Book Award, shortlisted (The Blue-Footed Booby)
- 2023: Cover of the Year, The Week Junior Book Awards, winner (Peanut Jones and the Twelve Portals)
- 2024: Oscar's Book Prize, shortlisted (Gigantic)
- 2024: Sheffield Children's Book Award, winner, picture book category (Gigantic)
- 2024: FCBG Children's Book Award, winner (Gigantic)
- 2024: Laugh-Out-Loud Award, shortlisted (The Blue-Footed Booby)
- 2024: Picture Book of the Year, The Week Junior Book Awards, highly commended (Gigantic)
- 2025: Illustrator of the Year, The British Book Awards, winner
- 2025: Brilliant Book Award, Lancashire School Library Service, winner (Gigantic)
- 2026: Waterstones Children's Book of the Month, October (The Last Wolf)

== Personal life ==
Biddulph is married with three daughters, and lives in London. He has a cocker spaniel called Ringo. He is a fan of Arsenal FC.
