= John Dougherty (author) =

Northern Irish children's writer

John Dougherty is a Northern Irish children's writer, born in the town of Larne in 1964. He now lives in Gloucestershire.

He worked as a primary school teacher during the 1990s and early 2000s; during this period, he began to write stories for children. His first book was published in 2004 and he left teaching the same year to concentrate on his writing career.

From November 2013 – 2015, he was chair of the Children's Writers and Illustrators Group (CWIG), a sub-group of the UK's Society of Authors.

He is a former patron of Reading in the UK.

He has also released a collection of songs.

== Published books ==
Stinkbomb & Ketchup-Face

- Stinkbomb & Ketchup-Face and the Badness of Badgers (2014)
- Stinkbomb & Ketchup-Face and the Quest for the Magic Porcupine (2014)
- Stinkbomb & Ketchup-Face and the Evilness of Pizza (2015)
- Stinkbomb & Ketchup-Face and the Bees of Stupidity (2015)
- Stinkbomb & Ketchup-Face and the Great Big Story Nickers (2016)
- Stinkbomb & Ketchup-Face and the Great Kerfuffle Christmas Kidnap (2016)
- Stinkbomb and Ketchup-Face and the Quest for the Magic Porcupine (2018)
- Stinkbomb and Ketchup-Face and the Pizza of Peril (2019)

all above illustrated by David Tazzyman

Picture books

- There's a Pig Up My Nose (2017), with illustrator Laura Hughes
- The Hare-Shaped Hole (2023), The Bear-Shaped Hole (2025) and It Won't Be Forever (2026) with illustrator Thomas Docherty

Zeus

- Zeus on the Loose (2004)
- Zeus to the Rescue (2007)
- Zeus Sorts It Out (2011)

Bansi O'Hara

- Bansi O'Hara and the Bloodline Prophecy (2008)
- Bansi O'Hara and the Edges of Hallowe'en (2011)

Jack Slater

- Jack Slater, Monster Investigator (2006)
- Jack Slater and the Whisper of Doom (2009)

Stand-alones

- Niteracy Hour (2005)
- Mark & Shark: Detectiving & Stuff (2019)
- Something in the Darkness (2026)

Reading books for schools include

- Finn MacCool & the Giant's Causeway (2011) - a retelling of the Irish legend for the Oxford Reading Tree
- Twice Upon a Time (2014) - part of the Treetops Chucklers (OUP) range
- A Midsummer Night's Dream (2014) - a retelling of the Shakespeare story for the Collins' Big Cats range
- The Story of Sir Dave (2014) - part of the OUP Project X range
- The Tempest (2015) - a retelling of the Shakespeare story for the Collins' Big Cats range
- Astron (2015) - for the Oxford Reading Tree
- The Fall of Julius Caesar (2017) - a retelling of the Shakespeare story for the Collins' Big Cats range
- Antony & Cleopatra (2017) - a retelling of the Shakespeare story for the Collins' Big Cats range
- Holiday of a Lifetime (2019) - for Treetops (OUP)

Poetry

- Dinosaurs & Dinner-Ladies (2016) and Zooming the Zoo (2024), illustrated by Tom Morgan-Jones

== Awards and nominations ==
- Zeus on the Loose was shortlisted for the Branford Boase Award 2005
- Niteracy Hour was shortlisted for the Nottingham Children's Book Prize 2006 and the Coventry Inspiration Raring 2 Read Award 2008
- Jack Slater, Monster Investigator was shortlisted for the Ottakars' Children's Book Prize 2006
- Stinkbomb & Ketchup-Face and the Great Big Story Nickers was shortlisted for the inaugural Eugenie Summerfield Children's Book Prize 2018
- There's a Pig Up My Nose won Oscar's Book Prize 2018
- Mark & Shark: Detecting & Stuff was a runner-up in the Coventry Inspiration Book Awards 2021
- The Hare-Shaped Hole won the Junior Juries’ Award and the Judges’ Special Award at the KPMG Children's Books Ireland Awards 2024 and the United Kingdom Literacy Association Award (3-6+) 2024. It was also shortlisted for Oscar's Book Prize 2024
