= The Mystery of the Clockwork Sparrow =

2015 novel by Katherine Woodfine

- Author: Katherine Woodfine
- Language: English
- Genre: Children
- Publisher: Egmont Publishing
- Publication date: 4 June 2015
- Publication place: United Kingdom
- Media type: Print (Paperback)
- Pages: 336
- ISBN: 9781405276177

The Mystery of the Clockwork Sparrow is the debut novel of British children's author Katherine Woodfine, initially published by Egmont Publishing in June 2015. The novel is the first book in The Sinclair's Mysteries, a quartet of mystery-adventure novels set in Edwardian England.The Mystery of the Clockwork Sparrow was Waterstones Children's Book of the Month in June 2015. The novel was inspired by Katherine's love of classic children's adventure stories, E. Nesbit, Frances Hodgson Burnett, Enid Blyton and Nancy Drew.

== Plot ==
Orphaned and impoverished after her father's death, Sophie finds a job in the millinery department of Sinclair's, a large department store located in London. While working there, she befriends a junior porter named Bill, and a window model who moonlights as an actress named Lil.

Just before the store is due to open, there is a burglary including the theft of the priceless Clockwork Sparrow. When Sophie herself becomes a suspect, the only solution is to solve the mystery of the Clockwork Sparrow. Her friends Lil, Billy, and a homeless character named Joe, band together to help her to solve the crime.

== Setting ==
This detective story is set in an Edwardian department store owned by an enigmatic New York millionaire. The department store setting was inspired by the likes of Selfridges and Fortnum and Mason.

== Publishing details ==
- Author: Katherine Woodfine
- First published: June 2015
- ISBN 9781405276177
- Publisher: Egmont Publishing
- Age range: 9+ years
- Genre: Children's Mystery Adventure Series
