= Victoria Forester =

Canadian writer

- Born: Victoria Forester; 1974 (age 51–52); Clarksburg, Maryland, U.S.A.
- Education: University of Toronto
- Occupations: Novelist, screenwriter, director
- Writing career
- Genres: Young adult fiction, fantasy, action, adventure
- Notable work: The Girl Who Could Fly The Boy Who Knew Everything
- Website: victoriaforester.com

Victoria Forester (born 1974) is a Canadian author and a screenwriter. She is known for her novel, The Girl Who Could Fly.

== Early life and education ==
Victoria Forester was born and grew up in a remote farm in Ontario, Canada. When she was seven years old, she was passionate to be a nun, but resisted such a calling after watching Julie Andrews's The Sound of Music. As a child, Forester hoped to become "the sort of princess who solved international crimes" until she became interested in synchronized swimming and, later, writing.

She studied and graduated from the University of Toronto.

== Career ==
After graduating, Forester's passion for storytelling led her to write and direct a short film for CBC. The Pony Tale was aired on Global Television and Forester moved to Los Angeles, California. Roger Corman, a famous independent film producer mentored her and gave the opportunity to write and later, direct her first feature film, Circuit Breaker, starring Richard Grieco and Corbin Bernsen.

Forester soon directed another film, Macon County Jail with David Carradine and Ally Sheedy, followed by a Disney Channel film, Cry of the White Wolf and Teen Scorcery, a story about mischievous teenage witches that was shot in Romania.

=== Novelist, The Girl Who Could Fly ===
Forester began writing The Girl Who Could Fly as a screenplay, which was optioned by Paramount Pictures. She loved the story so much she decided to write it as a novel.

== Awards ==
After publishing The Girl Who Could Fly, Forester won the Bank Street Best Children's Book of the Year, the Black Eyed Susan Award, Booklist Editors' Choice, Florida Sunshine State Young Readers Award Master List, Indiana Young Hoosier Award Master List and the Utah Beehive Book Award Master List Awards. The novel was under the Top 10 First Novels for Youth.

== Personal life ==
She lives in Los Angeles, California with her husband, daughter, and cat.

== Publications ==
- The Girl Who Could Fly (2008, reprinted in March 2010)
- The Boy Who Knew Everything (2015)
- The Girl Who Fell Out of the Sky (2020)
