= Egmont Group =

Danish publishing company

Egmont International Holding A/S
- Formerly: P. Petersen, Printers (1878–1914); Gutenberghus Group (1914–1992)
- Type: Private
- Industry: Media group
- Founded: 1878; 148 years ago Copenhagen, Denmark
- Founder: Egmont H. Petersen
- Headquarters: Copenhagen, Denmark
- Key people: Steffen Kragh (President & CEO); Steen Riisgaard (Chairman)
- Products: Books, Magazines, Film, Cinemas, Interactive media, Television
- Revenue: ▲€2,073 million (2021)
- Operating income: ▲€256 million (2021)
- Net income: ▲€224 million (2021)
- Total assets: ▲€2,500 million (2021)
- Total equity: ▲€1,098 million (2021)
- Number of employees: 5,376 (2021)
- Divisions: See § Egmont divisions
- Website: www.egmont.com

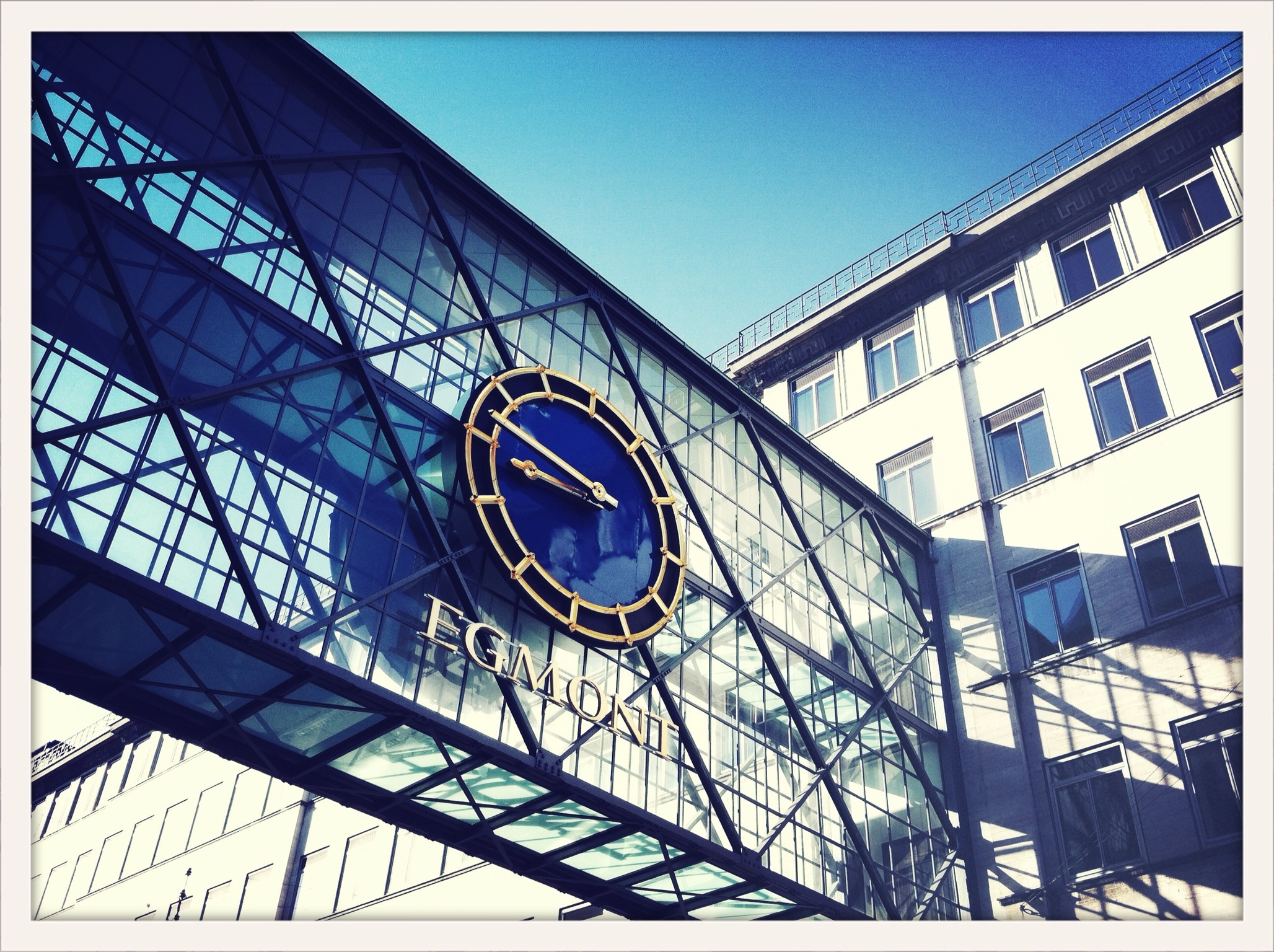
The Egmont clock, Copenhagen, Vognmagergade

The Egmont Group (officially Egmont International Holding A/S; known as Gutenberghus Group until 1992) is a Danish media corporation founded and rooted in Copenhagen, Denmark. The business area of Egmont has traditionally been magazine publishing, but has over the years evolved to comprise mass media generally.

== History ==
The Egmont Group was founded by Egmont Harald Petersen in 1878, as a one-man printing business, but soon became a magazine business. It was originally called "P. Petersen, Printers", named after Petersen's mother, as he was still too young at the time to register his own company. The company was renamed Gutenberghus in 1914 (after the famous inventor of the printing press), a name it kept until 1992.

In 1948, Gutenberghus, looking for new opportunities, sent its editor Dan Folke to Walt Disney Productions, and he managed to acquire a license for publishing comic magazines in Scandinavia. In 1948, the company started to publish a Donald Duck comic magazine in Sweden (as Kalle Anka & C:o) and Norway (as Donald Duck & C:o), in 1949 also in Denmark (as Anders And & C:o). This magazine features all the well known Disney characters, from Mickey Mouse to Little Hiawatha under license from Disney.

With the acquisition in 1963, of the Danish publisher Aschehoug, Egmont also entered the book market. From the late 1980s the Egmont Group used the close connection with Disney to expand their Scandinavian focus to a global focus, being the producer of Disney for the new Eastern European market, as well as for the Chinese market. In 1991, Egmont was co-founder of the Norwegian television channel TV 2, before buying it outright in 2012.

In 1992, Egmont bought Nordisk Film. In 1997, Egmont acquired Semic Press. In 1998, Egmont acquired the children's book catalogue of Reed Elsevier. In 2008, they acquired the minority stake in magazine publisher Hjemmet Mortensen which they did not already hold, from Orkla ASA.

In September 1999, Egmont Group entered a joint venture with Munich-based German production & distribution company EM.TV & Merchandising to launch a publishing subsidiary that could bring EM.TV's productions under one roof named Junior.Publishing. Egmont Group would later acquire the remaining 50% of the joint-venture children's publishing company Junior.Publishing two years later in November 2001 when EM.TV announced their exiting of the publishing business in order for them to focus on their core entertainment business giving Egmont full control of Junior.Publishing having it renamed to Egmont Publishing.

Egmont has a number of local country branches: Australia, Bulgaria (Egmont Bulgaria), China, Croatia, Czech Republic, Denmark, Estonia, Finland, Germany (Egmont Ehapa), Hungary, Latvia, Lithuania, Norway, Poland, Russia, Serbia, South Africa, Sweden, Turkey, Ukraine and United Kingdom.

Egmont is one of Scandinavia's leading media groups producing weeklies, magazines, comics, books, educational materials, activity products, movies and TV programs. The media group also operates movie theatres and TV stations, and the Egmont name is behind interactive games, game consoles, music and a wide range of digital media. Egmont publishes media in more than 30 countries, has over 5,300 employees and generated revenue amounting to over €2 billion in 2021.

By August 2002, Egmont Group entered a major restructure and had its entertainment distribution division Egmont Entertainment merged into its film & television production company Nordisk Film with former Egmont Entertainment header Kenneth Plummer became Nordisk Film's new managing director with Nordisk Film will handle all of Egmont's film & television production activities as Soren E. Jakobsen stepped down as film chief of the latter but would continued to work Egmont's television interests. Six days later following the restructure and merger of Egmont Group's entertainment division Egmont Entertainment with their film & television production and distribution company Egmont Group shuttered their animation international production arm Egmont Imagination and had most of Egmont Imagination's projects being absorbed into Egmont's multimedia entertainment, film & television production and distribution company Nordisk Film. The following year in March 2003, Dutch production & distribution company Telescreen alongside its parent Palm Plus Multimedia acquired the Egmont Imagination catalogue outside the Nordic regions from Egmont Group with Telescreen distributing the Egmont Imagination library internationally except the Nordic regions.

Egmont acquired Forma Publishing Group in October 2014. In January 2015, the company shut down its American publishing division.

On 1 May 2020, Egmont completed the sale of three of its publishers (Egmont Books UK, Egmont Poland, and Schneiderbuch Germany) to HarperCollins.

== Group management ==
- Steffen Kragh – President and CEO
- Hans J. Carstensen – CFO
- Torsten Bjerre Rasmussen – Executive Vice President, Egmont and CEO for Egmont Publishing
- Allan Mathson Hansen – Executive Vice President, Egmont and President for Egmont Nordisk Film
- Olav T. Sandnes – CEO and Chief Editor of TV 2 in Norway

== Egmont divisions ==
- Story House Egmont
- Egmont Books
- Nordisk Film
- TV 2 Group

== Egmont UK / Farshore ==
Egmont UK publishes books and magazines for children in the United Kingdom. It is the largest dedicated children's publisher in the UK. The Head Office is in London. In May 2020, the books division of Egmont UK was sold to HarperCollins. The new imprint changed its name to Farshore in February 2021.

=== Egmont Books ===
In 1998, Reed Elsevier sold Dean & Son, World Distributors, and the children's divisions of Heinemann, Methuen, Hamlyn and Mammoth to the Egmont Group.

Egmont UK's book list includes fiction novels, illustrated picture books, pop-up and novelty books, fantasy adventures, annuals, colouring, activity and sticker books as well and Egmont's own Reading Ladder (for five- to nine-year-olds). Egmont also has a number of young adult fiction works, award-winners, classics and epic tales.

The Fiction list includes work from such award-winning authors as Andy Stanton, Jim Smith, Michael Morpurgo, Lemony Snicket, Jamila Gavin and David Levithan. Electric Monkey is Egmont's dedicated Young Adult imprint and authors published include Elizabeth Acevedo, Michael Grant, Andrew A. Smith, Tahereh Mafi and Holly Jackson.

The Picture Book list includes work from authors such as Julia Donaldson, Kristina Stephenson, Michael Morpurgo and John Dougherty (author). Classic stories published by Egmont UK include The Velveteen Rabbit, The Little Prince and The Wind in the Willows. Authors on the non-fiction Red Shed imprint include Chris Packham and Laura Coryton.

Illustrators who are published by Egmont include Helen Oxenbury, Shirley Hughes, Jim Field, Rob Biddulph, Steven Lenton, Alex T. Smith and Colin and Jacqui Hawkins.

The Brands & Licensing books list includes titles from the following brands:

- Babar
- Blue's Clues
- Disney Princess
- Dora the Explorer
- Even Stevens
- Fireman Sam
- Flying Rhino Junior High
- Franklin
- Frozen
- In a Heartbeat
- The Jersey
- Life with Derek
- Lizzie McGuire
- Little People
- Mr. Men & Little Miss
- Minecraft
- Mumble Bumble
- My Little Pony
- Naturally, Sadie
- Paz the Penguin
- Pokémon
- Power Rangers
- Roblox
- Rubik's Cube
- Ryan's World
- Rupert Bear
- Something Special (TV series)
- Star Wars
- Teletubbies
- Thomas and Friends
- Toy Story
- Tracey McBean
- The Adventures of Tintin
- The Fairytaler
- Winnie-the-Pooh
- Wilbur
- Willa's Wild Life

Egmont offers a range of personalised books through their website.

The Dean imprint (Dean & Son) offers consumer-led, bespoke publishing direct to retailers.

=== Egmont Magazines ===
In 1991, Egmont purchased the Fleetway arm of IPC Media in the UK from a company owned by Robert Maxwell, and merged it with their existing comics publishing division, London Editions, and thus became Britain's largest comic book publisher. The resultant company, Fleetway Editions, was absorbed into the main Egmont brand by 2000, having largely divested itself of its original portfolio (such as 2000 AD) and continued with only reprint and licensed material titles (e.g. Sonic The Comic). The Fleetway archive comprises those comics characters first published by IPC subsidiaries on or after 1 January 1970, together with 26 specifically named characters first published in Buster before that date. In August 2016, The IPC/Fleetway library was sold to Rebellion Developments, who had previously acquired 2000 AD.

Egmont Magazines currently publish titles including Toxic, Thomas & Friends, Disney Princess, Frozen, Minecraft, and Go Girl.

== Egmont Foundation ==
Egmont has a charitable wing. The founder's last will and testament paved the way for Egmont's charitable work to support social, cultural and scientific causes. As a foundation, Egmont helps improve children's and young people's quality of life, donating more than 235 million Euros to social, cultural and health projects since 1920.

== See also ==
- Fleetway Publications
- List of UK children's book publishers
