= Branford Boase Award =

Annual literary award

- Awarded for: Writers award
- Country: United Kingdom
- First award: 2000; 26 years ago
- Website: branfordboaseaward.org.uk

The Branford Boase Award is a British literary award presented annually to an outstanding children's or young-adult novel by a first-time writer; "the most promising book for seven year-olds and upwards by a first time novelist." The award is shared by both the author and their editor, which The Oxford Companion to Children's Literature noted is unusual for literary awards.

== History ==
Wendy Boase, Editorial Director of Walker Books, and Henrietta Branford worked together to produce a great number of books. Both Boase and Branford died in 1999 of cancer. The Branford Boase Award was created to celebrate and commemorate their names and memories and to encourage new talent in writing, which they worked for. The awards were a joint idea by Julia Eccleshare and Anne Marley who both had jobs to do with books. The Branford Boase Award runs alongside the Henrietta Branford Writing Competition for young writers (under 19).

Winners receive a hand-crafted box with the Branford Boase Award logo and a cheque for £1,000. The prize and the official website are currently sponsored by the best-selling children's writer Jacqueline Wilson. The award is given to both the author and their editor, "in recognition of the editor’s role in bringing a debut author to market."

== Reception ==
The Oxford Companion to Children's Literature has written that the award's "success in talent-spotting has been impressive, consistently recognising debut works by writers who subsequently go on to achieve great things—among them Marcus Sedgwick, Mal Peet, Meg Rosoff, B. R. Collins, Frances Hardinge, Sally Prue, Kevin Brooks and Siobhan Dowd."

In 2018 judges for the competition criticized the amount of family dramas nominated for the award, stating that it was formulaic and showed a lack of diversity. Judge Philip Womack stated that at least third of the books fell into this category and that they all had a “very similar narrative: there’s an ill child at home, who notices something odd, and is probably imagining it, but not telling the reader. They’re all in the first person, all in the present tense, all of a type". The Bookseller commented on the shortlist submissions for 2022, noting that there was a wider variety of authors and that they were more ambitious, which they felt resulted in "freshly told stories which reflect the writers’ understanding of the needs of today’s readers and the certainty of authors and publishers that those readers want to read outside their own experiences." Publishing Perspectives praised the 2022 shortlist for including a strong selection of books that appeal to both boys and girls.

== Winners ==
Branford Boase Award winners
Year	Writer	Title	Editor	Publisher	Ref.
2000	Katherine Roberts	Song Quest	Barry Cunningham	Chicken House	
2001	Marcus Sedgwick	Floodland	Fiona Kennedy	Orion Books	
2002	Sally Prue	Cold Tom	Liz Cross	Oxford	
2003	Kevin Brooks	Martyn Pig	Barry Cunningham	Chicken House	
2004	Mal Peet	Keeper	Paul Harrison	Walker Books	
2005	Meg Rosoff	How I Live Now	Rebecca McNally	Puffin Books	
2006	Frances Hardinge	Fly By Night	Ruth Alltimes	Macmillan Children's Books	
2007	Siobhan Dowd	A Swift Pure Cry	David Fickling and Bella Pearson	David Fickling Books	
2008	Jenny Downham	Before I Die	David Fickling	David Fickling Books	
2009	B. R. Collins	The Traitor Game	Emma Matthewson	Bloomsbury Publishing	
2010	Lucy Christopher	Stolen	Imogen Cooper	Chicken House	
2011	Jason Wallace	Out of Shadows	Charlie Sheppard	Andersen Press	
2012	Annabel Pitcher	My Sister Lives on the Mantelpiece	Fiona Kennedy	Orion	
2013	Dave Shelton	A Boy and a Bear in a Boat	David Fickling	David Fickling Books	
2014	C. J. Flood	Infinite Sky	Venetia Gosling	Simon & Schuster	
2015	Rosie Rowell	Leopold Blue	Katie Thomas	Hot Key Books	
2016	Horatio Clare, illus. by Jane Matthews	Aubrey and the Terrible Yoot	Penny Thomas	Firefly Press	
2017	M. G. Leonard	Beetle Boy	Barry Cunningham and Rachel Leyshon	Chicken House	
2018	Mitch Johnson	Kick	Rebecca Hill and Becky Walker	Usborne Publishing	
2019	Muhammad Khan	I Am Thunder	Lucy Pearse	Macmillan Children's Books	
2020	Liz Hyder	Bearmouth	Sarah Odedina	Pushkin Children's Books	
2021	Struan Murray	Orphans of the Tide	Ben Horslen	Puffin Books	
2022	Maisie Chan	Danny Chung Does Not Do Maths	Georgia Murray	Piccadilly Press	
2023	Christine Pillainayagam	Ellie Pillai Is Brown	Leah Thaxton		
2024	Nathanael Lessore	Steady for This	Ella Whiddett and Ruth Bennett		
2025	Margaret McDonald	Glasgow Boys	Alice Swan and Ama Badu	Faber & Faber	
2026	Asli Jensen	Love on Sight	Shalini Vallepur	Chicken House	

== Shortlists ==
=== 2000s ===
Year		Title	Editor(s)	Publisher	Result	Ref.
2000	Katherine Roberts	Song Quest	Barry Cunningham	The Chicken House	Winner	
2000	Dominic Barker	Sharp Stuff		Transworld	Finalist	
2000	Gus Clarke	Can We Keep It, Dad?		Andersen Press	Finalist	
2000	Richard Kidd	The Giant Goldfish Robbery		Transworld	Finalist	
2000	Paul May	Troublemakers		Transworld	Finalist	
2000	Stephen Pots	Hunting Gumnor		Egmont	Finalist	
2000	Louise Rennison	Angus, Thongs and Full-Frontal Snogging		Piccadilly Press	Finalist	
2001	Marcus Sedgwick	Floodland	Fiona Kennedy	Orion Books	Winner	
2001	Nick Manns	Control Shift		Hodder	Finalist	
2001	William Nicholson	The Wind Singer		Egmont	Finalist	
2001	Hazel Riley	Thanis		Oxford University Press	Finalist	
2002	Sally Prue	Cold Tom	Liz Cross	Oxford University Press	Winner	
2002	Emma Barnes	Jessica Haggerthwaite: Witch Dispatcher		Bloomsbury Publishing	Finalist	
2002	Adele Minchin	The Beat Goes On		Women's Press	Finalist	
2002	Bali Rai	(Un)arranged Marriage		Corgi	Finalist	
2002	Philip Reeve	Mortal Engines		Scholastic	Finalist	
2003	Kevin Brooks	Martyn Pig	Barry Cunningham	The Chicken House	Winner	
2003	Julia Bell	Massive		Pan Macmillan	Finalist	
2003	Patricia Elliott	Ice Boy		Hodder	Finalist	
2003	Richard MacSween	The Firing		Andersen Press	Finalist	
2003	Simon Mason	The Quigleys		David Fickling Books	Finalist	
2003	Livi Michael	Frank and the Black Hamster of Narkiz		Puffin Books	Finalist	
2003	Nicky Singer	Feather Boy		HarperCollins	Finalist	
2004	Mal Peet	Keeper	Paul Harrison	Walker Books	Winner	
2004	Steve Augarde	The Various		David Fickling Books	Finalist	
2004	Graham Gardner	Inventing Elliot		Dolphin	Finalist	
2004	Julie Hearn	Follow Me Down		Oxford University Press	Finalist	
2004	L. S. Matthews	Fish		Hodder	Finalist	
2004	Eleanor Updale	Montmorency		Scholastic	Finalist	
2005	Meg Rosoff	How I Live Now	Rebecca McNally	Puffin Books	Winner	
2005	Alison Allen-Gray	Unique		Oxford University Press	Finalist	
2005	Cathy Cassidy	Dizzy		Puffin Books	Finalist	
2005	Frank Cottrell-Boyce	Millions		Macmillan	Finalist	
2005	John Dougherty	Zeus on the Loose		Random House	Finalist	
2005	Michelle Paver	Wolf Brother		Orion Books	Finalist	
2005	Leslie Wilson	Last Train from Kummersdorf		Faber	Finalist	
2006	Frances Hardinge	Fly By Night	Ruth Alltimes	Macmillan Children's Books	Winner	
2006	Nicola Davies	Home		Walker Books	Finalist	
2006	Joshua Doder	A Dog Called Grk		Andersen Press	Finalist	
2006	Ann Kelley	The Burying Beetle		Luath Press	Finalist	
2006	Anthony McGowan	Hellbent		Doubleday	Finalist	
2006	Sarah Singleton	Century		Simon & Schuster	Finalist	
2006	Cat Weatherill	Barkbelly		Puffin Books	Finalist	
2007	Siobhan Dowd	A Swift Pure Cry	David Fickling and Bella Pearson	David Fickling Books	Winner	
2007	Linda Buckley-Archer	Gideon the Cutpurse		Simon & Schuster	Finalist	
2007	Charlie Fletcher	Stoneheart		Hodder	Finalist	
2007	Ally Kennen	Beast		Scholastic	Finalist	
2007	Sian Pattenden	The Awful Tale of Agatha Bilke		Short Books	Finalist	
2007	Andy Stanton	You're a Bad Man, Mr Gum		Egmont	Finalist	
2007	Tabitha Suzuma	A Note of Madness		Random House	Finalist	
2008	Jenny Downham	Before I Die	David Fickling	David Fickling Books	Winner	
2008	Atinuke	Anna Hibiscus		Walker Books	Finalist	
2008	L. Brittney	Nathan Fox: Dangerous Times		Macmillan	Finalist	
2008	Sharon Dogar	Waves		The Chicken House	Finalist	
2008	Sarah Mussi	The Door of No Return		Hodder	Finalist	
2008	Jenny Valentine	Finding Violet Park		HarperCollins	Finalist	
2009	B. R. Collins	The Traitor Game	Emma Matthewson	Bloomsbury Publishing	Winner	
2009	Emily Diamand	Flood Child (Note: Flood Child was originally published as Reavers' Ransom.)		The Chicken House	Finalist	
2009	Marie-Louise Jensen	Between Two Seas		Oxford University Press	Finalist	
2009	Katy Moran	Bloodline		Walker Books	Finalist	
2009	Patrick Ness	The Knife of Never Letting Go		Walker Books	Finalist	
2009	Sally Nicholls	Ways to Live Forever		Scholastic	Finalist	
2009	Jeremy de Quidt	The Toymaker		David Fickling Books	Finalist	

=== 2010s ===
Year		Title	Editor(s)	Publisher	Result	Ref.
2010	Lucy Christopher	Stolen	Imogen Cooper	The Chicken House	Winner	
2010	Sarwat Chadda	Devil's Kiss		Puffin Books	Finalist	
2010	Damian Kelleher	Life, Interrupted		Piccadilly Press	Finalist	
2010	Anna Perera	Guantanamo Boy		Puffin Books	Finalist	
2010	Dan Tunstall	Big and Clever		Five Leaves	Finalist	
2010	Rachel Ward	Numbers		The Chicken House	Finalist	
2010	Victor Watson	Paradise Barn		Catnip	Finalist	
2011	Jason Wallace	Out of Shadows	Charlie Sheppard	Andersen Press	Winner	
2011	J P Buxton	I am the Blade	Beverley Birch	Hachette	Finalist	
2011	Keren David	When I Was Joe	Maurice Lyon	Frances Lincoln	Finalist	
2011	Candy Gourlay	Tall Story	Bella Pearson	David Fickling Books	Finalist	
2011	Gregory Hughes	Unhooking the Moon	Roisin Heycock	Quercus	Finalist	
2011	Pat Walsh	The Crowfield Curse	Imogen Cooper	The Chicken House	Finalist	
2012	Annabel Pitcher	My Sister Lives on the Mantelpiece	Fiona Kennedy	Orion Books	Winner	
2012	Lindsey Barraclough	Long Lankin	Annie Eaton and Natalie Doherty	Bodley Head	Finalist	
2012	Phil Earle	Being Billy	Shannon Park	Puffin Books	Finalist	
2012	Lissa Evans	Small Change for Stuart	Annie Eaton and Ruth Knowles	Bodley Head	Finalist	
2012	Ali Lewis	Everybody Jam	Charlie Sheppard	Andersen Press	Finalist	
2012	Gill Lewis	Sky Hawk	Liz Cross	Oxford University Press	Finalist	
2012	Irfan Master	A Beautiful Lie	Emma Matthewson	Bloomsbury Publishing	Finalist	
2013	Dave Shelton	A Boy and a Bear in a Boat	David Fickling	David Fickling Books	Winner	
2013	S. D. Crockett	After the Snow	Emma Young	Macmillan	Finalist	
2013	Natasha Farrant	The Things We Did for Love	Julia Heydon-Wells	Faber	Finalist	
2013	Edward Hogan	Daylight Saving	Mara Bergman	Walker Books	Finalist	
2013	Wendy Meddour	A Hen in the Wardrobe	Janetta Otter-Barry	Frances Lincoln	Finalist	
2013	Andrew Prentice and Jonathan Weil	Black Arts	Simon Mason	David Fickling Books	Finalist	
2013	Lydia Syson	A World Between Us	Sarah Odedina	Hot Key Books	Finalist	
2014	C. J. Flood	Infinite Sky	Venetia Gosling	Simon & Schuster	Winner	
2014	Natasha Carthew	Winter Damage	Rebecca McNally	Bloomsbury Publishing	Finalist	
2014	Rob Lloyd Jones	Wild Boy	Mara Bergman and Lucy Early	Walker Books	Finalist	
2014	Julie Mayhew	Red Ink	Emily Thomas	Hot Key Books	Finalist	
2014	Ross Montgomery	Alex the Dog and the Unopenable Door	Rebecca Lee and Susila Baybars	Faber	Finalist	
2014	Fletcher Moss	The Poison Boy	Imogen Cooper and Barry Cunningham	The Chicken House	Finalist	
2014	Holly Smale	Geek Girl	Lizzy Clifford	HarperCollins	Finalist	
2015	Rosie Rowell	Leopold Blue	Katie Thomas	Hot Key Books	Winner	
2015	Sara Crowe	Bone Jack	Charlie Sheppard and Eloise Wilson	Andersen Press	Finalist	
2015	Clare Furniss	The Year of the Rat	Jane Griffiths	Simon & Schuster	Finalist	
2015	Giancario Gemin	Cowgirl	Kirstie Stansfield	Nosy Crow	Finalist	
2015	Sally Green	Half Bad	Ben Horslen	Puffin Books	Finalist	
2015	Non Pratt	Trouble	Annalie Grainger and Denise Johnstone-Burt	Walker Books	Finalist	
2015	Rupert Wallis	The Dark Inside	Jane Griffiths	Simon & Schuster	Finalist	
2016	Horatio Clare, illus. by Jane Matthews	Aubrey and the Terrible Yoot	Penny Thomas	Firefly Press	Winner	
2016	David Hofmeyr	Stone Rider	Ben Horslen and Tig Wallace	Penguin Random House	Finalist	
2016	Will Mabbitt, illus. by Ross Collins	The Unlikely Adventures of Mabel Jones	Ben Horslen	Penguin Random House	Finalist	
2016	David Solomon	My Brother is a Superhero	Kirsty Stansfield	Nosy Crow	Finalist	
2016	Ross Welford	Time Travelling with a Hamster	Nick Lake	HarperCollins Children’s Books	Finalist	
2016	Lisa Williamson	The Art of Being Normal	Bella Pearson	David Fickling Books	Finalist	
2017	M. G. Leonard	Beetle Boy	Barry Cunningham and Rachel Leyshon	The Chicken House	Winner	
2017	Peter Bunzi	Cogheart	Rebecca Hill	Usborne	Finalist	
2017	Amber Lee Dodd	We Are Giants	Niamh Mulvey	Quercus	Finalist	
2017	Sue Durrant	Little Bits of Sky	Kirsty Stansfield	Nosy Crow	Finalist	
2017	Stewart Foster	The Bubble Boy	Rachel Mann	Simon & Schuster	Finalist	
2017	Kiran Millwood Hargrave	The Girl of Ink and Stars	Rachel Leyshon	The Chicken House	Finalist	
2017	Martin Stewart	Riverkeep	Shannon Cullen and Sharyn November	Penguin Random House	Finalist	
2018	Mitch Johnson	Kick	Rebecca Hill and Becky Walker	Usborne Publishing	Winner	
2018	Yaba Badoe	A Jigsaw of Fire and Stars	Fiona Kennedy	Head of Zeus: Zephyr	Finalist	
2018	Sharon Cohen	The Starman and Me	Sarah Lambert	Quercus Children’s Books	Finalist	
2018	Chloe Daykin	Fish Boy	Leah Thaxton	Faber	Finalist	
2018	Elys Dolan	Knighthood for Beginners	Clare Whitston and Elv Moody	Oxford University Press	Finalist	
2018	Tony Mitton	Potter's Boy	Anthony Hinton	David Fickling Books	Finalist	
2018	Jacob Sager Weinstein	The City of Secret Rivers	Gill Evans	Walker Books	Finalist	
2019	Muhammad Khan	I Am Thunder	Lucy Pearse	Macmillan Children's Books	Winner	
2019	Sophie Anderson	The House with Chicken Legs	Rebecca Hill and Becky Walker	Usborne	Finalist	
2019	P. G. Bell	The Train to Impossible Places	Rebecca Hill and Becky Walker	Usborne	Finalist	
2019	Mel Darbon	Rosie Loves Jack	Sarah Stewart	Usborne	Finalist	
2019	Rowena House	The Goose Road	Mara Bergman	Walker Books	Finalist	
2019	Matt Killeen	Orphan Monster Spy	Sarah Stewart and Kendra Levin	Usborne	Finalist	
2019	Onjali Q Raúf	The Boy at the Back of the Class	Lena McCauley	Orion Books	Finalist	

=== 2020s ===
Year		Title	Editor(s)	Publisher	Result	Ref.
2020	Liz Hyder	Bearmouth	Sarah Odedina	Pushkin Children's Books	Winner	
2020	Humza Arshad and Henry White	Little Badman and the Invasion of the Killer Aunties	Sharan Matharu and Holly Harris	Puffin Books	Finalist	
2020	Katya Balen	The Space We're In	Lucy Mackay-Sim	Bloomsbury Publishing	Finalist	
2020	Aisha Bushby	A Pocketful of Stars	Liz Bankes and Sarah Levison	Egmont	Finalist	
2020	Holly Jackson	A Good Girl's Guide to Murder	Lindsey Heaven	Electric Monkey	Finalist	
2020	Jamie Littler	Frostheart	Naomi Colthurst	Puffin Books	Finalist	
2020	Emma Smith-Barton	The Million Pieces of Neena Gill	Naomi Colthurst	Penguin Books	Finalist	
2021	Struan Murray	Orphans of the Tide	Ben Horslen	Puffin Books	Winner	
2021	Kereen Getten	When Life Gives You Mangoes	Sara Odedina	Pushkin Press	Finalist	
2021	Finbar Hawkins	Witch	Fiona Kennedy	Zephyr	Finalist	
2021	Danielle Jawando	And the Stars Were Burning Brightly	Jane Griffiths	Simon & Schuster	Finalist	
2021	Manjeet Mann	Run, Rebel	Carmen McCullough	Penguin Books	Finalist	
2021	Elle McNicoll	A Kind of Spark	Eishar Brar	Knights Of	Finalist	
2021	Jenny Pearson	The Super Miraculous Journey of Freddie Yates	Rebecca Hill and Becky Walker	Usborne	Finalist	
2022	Maisie Chan	Danny Chung Does Not Do Maths	Georgia Murray	Piccadilly Press	Winner	
2022	Natasha Bowen	Skin of the Sea	Carmen McCullough and Tricia Lin	Penguin Books	Finalist	
2022	Femi Fadugba	The Upper World	Emma Jones, Stephanie Stein, and Asmaa Isse	Penguin Books	Finalist	
2022	Luke Palmer	Grow	Penny Thomas	Firefly Press	Finalist	
2022	Lesley Parr	The Valley of Lost Secrets	Zoë Griffiths	Bloomsbury Publishing	Finalist	
2022	Ros Roberts	Digger and Me	Ella Whiddett and Ruth Bennett	Little Tiger	Finalist	
2022	Helen Rutter	The Boy Who Made Everyone Laugh	Lauren Fortune	Scholastic	Finalist	
2022	Nadia Shireen	Grimwood	Ali Dougal	Simon & Schuster	Finalist	
2023	Christine Pillainayagam	Ellie Pillai is Brown	Leah Thaxton	Faber	Winner	
2023	Kel Duckhouse	The Bones of Me	Harriet Birkinshaw	Flying Eye Books	Finalist	
2023	Louise Finch	The Eternal Return of Clara Hart	Siobhán Parkinson	Little Island Books	Finalist	
2023	Caryl Lewis, illus. by George Ermos	Seed	Sarah Hughes	Macmillan Children’s Books	Finalist	
2023	Ann Sei Lin	Rebel Skies	Gráinne Clear	Walker Books	Finalist	
2023	Nadia Mikail	The Cats We Meet Along the Way	Bella Pearson	Guppy Books	Finalist	
2023	J P Rose	The Haunting of Tyrese Walker	Chloe Sackur	Andersen Press	Finalist	
2023	Yarrow Townsend	The Map of Leaves	Rachel Leyshon	The Chicken House	Finalist	
