= Simon Mason (author) =

British author

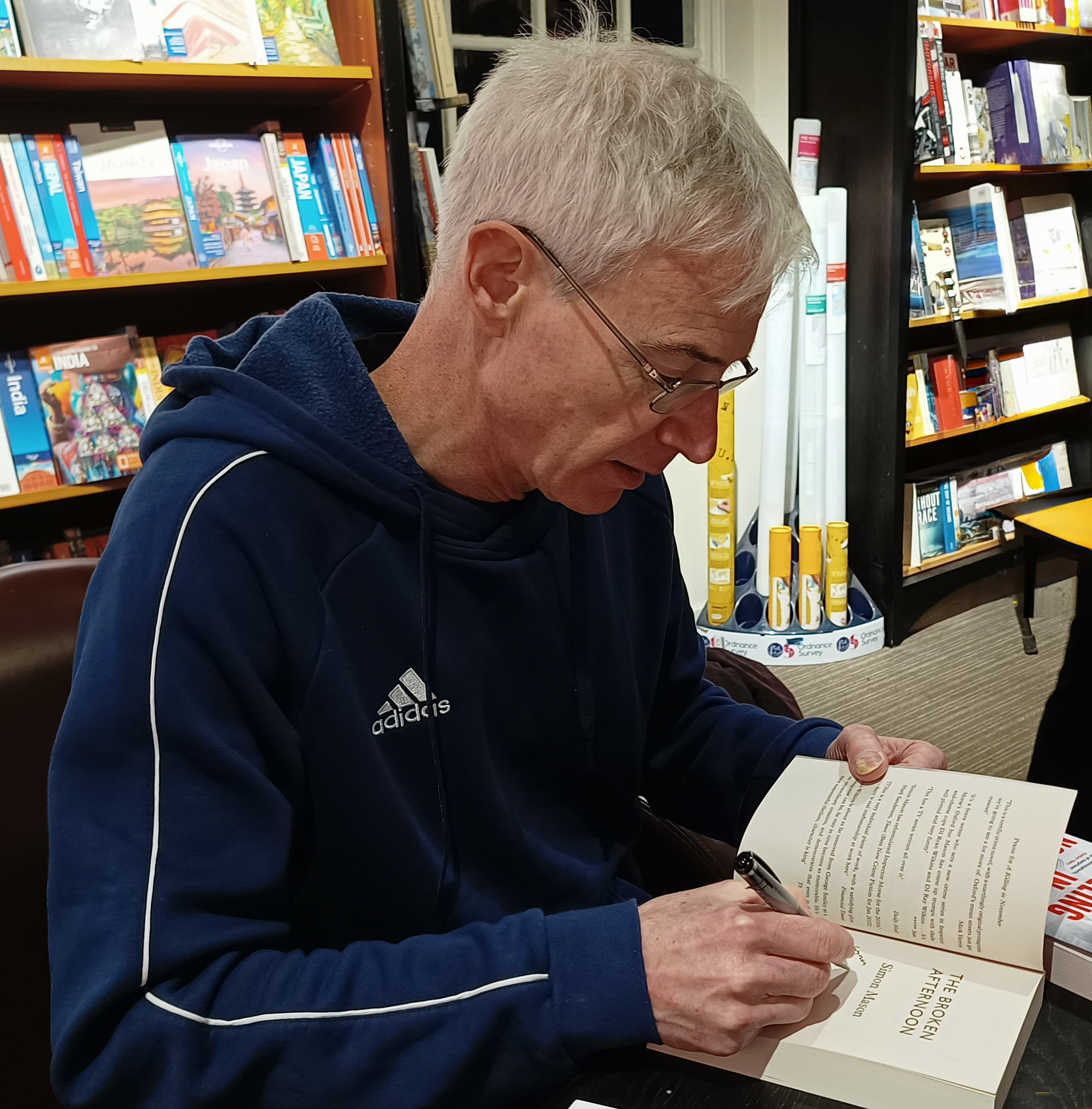
Mason in 2024

Simon Mason (born 5 February 1962) is a British author of juvenile and adult fiction, and of non-fiction.

== Biography ==
Simon Mason was born in Sheffield, Yorkshire, on 5 February 1962. His father was the footballer Cliff Mason. He was educated at local schools and studied English at Lady Margaret Hall, Oxford. During a career in publishing, he worked for a number of different companies, including Oxford University Press, Thames and Hudson, Pushkin Press and David Fickling Books, where he was managing director from 2012 to 2018. He has also taught at Oxford Brookes University, where he is Fellow of Creative Writing. From 2021 to 2023 he was a Royal Literary Fund Fellow at Exeter College, Oxford. He lives with his wife in Oxford.

== Children's and young adult fiction ==
In 2002, Mason wrote the children's series The Quigleys, about a spirited and lovable family.

The Quigleys marked the start of a series featuring the eccentric Quigley family and was short-listed for the Branford Boase Award in 2003.

- The Quigleys, 2002
  - Review, Hornbook Magazine 1 July 2002
- The Quigleys Not for Sale, 2004
- The Quigleys at Large. 2004.
  - Review, Washington Post, 7 March 2004
  - Review Hornbook Magazine, 1 September 2003
- The Quigleys in a Spin
  - Review, Hornbook Magazine, 1 March 2006
  - Review, Toronto Star, 11 June 2006

Mason's 2011 novel, Moon Pie, published by David Fickling Books was short-listed for the Guardian Children's Fiction Prize.

Julia Eccleshare, chair of the Guardian Children's Fiction Prize judging panel, said: "How love is tested, challenged and threatened, but can ultimately hold families together is at the heart of Moon Pie. Martha is used to managing her father's sometimes erratic behaviour after her mother dies. Dealing with his oddities and caring for her small brother Tug seems not much stranger than her friend Marcus's obsession with Hollywood movies. But finally, even for her, it is all just a bit too much. This is a beautifully told story that is long on affection and short on preaching."

The young adult murder mystery novel, Running Girl, published in 2014, features Garvie Smith "a combination of the eccentric and hardboiled detective types - a natural maths genius with an off-the-scale IQ who chooses to be a slacker." It was shortlisted for the 2014 Costa Children's Book Award. In 2016, the second Garvie Smith thriller, Kid Got Shot (Kid Alone in the US), was published, described in Crime Review as "clever, complex, original, and very, very absorbing". It won the 2017 Crimefest Prize for Best Crime Novel for Young Adults. The third novel in the series, Hey, Sherlock!, was published in 2019, described by Philip Pullman as "the most intriguing kind of whodunit", and welcomed by the Sunday Times as "irresistible . . . as twisty, clever and riveting as the others.".

== Adult novels ==
- The Great English Nude, published by Constable & Co in 1990, won a £2,000 Betty Trask Award in 1991 for first novels written by authors under the age of 35 in a romantic or traditional, but not experimental, style. The Great English Nude was published in the US as Portrait of the Artist with My Wife .
- Death of a Fantasist was published by Constable & Co in 1994. It was described by The Independent as "inevitably reminiscent of Martin Amis. Its well-crafted comedy gets blacker and blacker until suddenly the reader finds the balance has shifted: there is real menace in the air."
- Lives of the Dog-Stranglers was published by Jonathan Cape in 1998. It is described as "Like any suburb in the south of England, Parkside's character is formed by rumour and fantasy and everyone is the figment of his neighbour's imagination: 'We're anything they want us to be - murderers, redheads, philanderers, dog-stranglers.' This is an elegant, savage farce of suburbia."

DI Wilkins Mysteries

- A Killing in November (Riverrun, 2022) is the first novel in a crime series set in the New Hinksey suburb of Oxford, featuring a mismatched pair of detectives both called Wilkins (Ryan, who grew up on a trailer park, and the suave and sophisticated Ray). Shortlisted for the CWA Gold Dagger, it was a Sunday Times Crime Book of the Month. The Broken Afternoon (riverrun, 2023), the second book in the series, was also a Sunday Times Crime Book of the Month. Writing in the Times, Mark Sanderson said that "Simon Mason has reformulated Inspector Morse for the 2020s."
- The Broken Afternoon (Riverrun 2023) The second DI Ryan Wilkins Mystery.
  A four-year-old girl goes missing in plain sight outside her nursery in Oxford.
- Lost and Never Found (Riverrun 2024) The third DI Ryan Wilkins Mystery.
  The Wilkinses must investigate the high-profile disappearance of a celebrity.
- A Voice in the Night (Riverrun 2025) In the fourth of the DI Ryan Wilkins Mysteries, the Wilkinses contend with organized shoplifting and the seemingly unremarkable death of an elderly man.
- The Dangerous Stranger (Riverrun 2026) In the fifth installment, a boy is violently assaulted outside a refugee hotel, and a complex investigation starts. As the Wilkinses investigate the brutal crime, they realize the real story isn’t what anyone expected.

Finder Mysteries

- Missing Person: Alice (Riverrun 2024) is the first in the 'Finder' series.
- The Case of the Lonely Accountant (2024)
- The Woman Who Laughed (2025)

== Non-fiction ==
He is the author of The Rough Guide to Classic Novels, in the Rough Guides series, published in 2003. It is described as "a consummate demonstration that it is possible to celebrate the finest achievements of the human race in the arts and humanities without couching them in forbidding academic language".

Author Kate Mosse is quoted as saying, "it reads like a novel and it's partly because Simon is a really great writer... The thing that distinguishes Simon's book from the other guides that there have been in this area is he has squarely said it cannot be a classic if it's not entertaining"
