= The Night She Disappeared =

2012 young-adult novel by April Henry

- First edition
- Author: April Henry
- Language: English
- Genre: Young adult Crime & mystery
- Published: 13 March 2012 Henry Holt
- Publication place: America
- Media type: Print
- Pages: 228
- ISBN: 9780805092622
- OCLC: 740628769

The Night She Disappeared is a young-adult crime / mystery novel by American author April Henry, released on March 13, 2012 through Henry Holt and Company. In June 2012, Henry announced that the film company Tempest had optioned the rights to the novel.

== Plot ==
Drew works at Pete's Pizza with Kayla Cutler and receives a phone call from a customer named John Robertson. Before ordering he asks if Drew's colleague Gabie Klug, a part-time delivery girl is working. Drew doesn't answer his question. He sends Kayla out with the order; she does not return. The police are called to investigate. Gabie is blamed for her disappearance as she switched nights with Kayla so that she worked Wednesday. Witnesses say that it was a boy named Cody because he painted his white truck brown. Gabie finds out that John Robertson didn't want Kayla; he wanted Gabie.

== Reception ==
The novel received positive reviews. Wendy Schmalz, for Publishers Weekly, was particularly effusive, stating "it's a riveting story that many readers will finish in one sitting", finding that "each chapter is a surprise, and the tension builds steadily until the inevitable climactic face-off." Erin Wyatt, for VOYA magazine, found it to be a "plot-driven, page-turning thriller", stating that "Henry provides just enough detail to provide depth and complexity to the characters" and that "the suspense builds to a fever pitch near the end of the book." Traci Glass, for School Library Journal, called the novel a "fast-paced, gripping thriller" and that "fans of intense page-turners and those who liked Michele Jaffe's Rosebush or Lucy Christopher's Stolen will love this one." Tempering this a little, Glass also found that "the ending comes a little too fast and is too neatly tied up", though does find that, despite this, "Gabie is an intriguing protagonist." Kirkus Reviews offered a more critical viewpoint, stating that they found that the way the novel is written, including various police reports and interviews and varying character view-points, to "add interest and texture to what otherwise would be a straight genre tale". They found that "the police seem amazingly obtuse, Gabie's belief that Kayla is alive is given no realistic, clue-based hook and the third quarter [of the novel] has some pacing problems"; however also that "Gabie and Drew's budding relationship is believable, and it has a strong wingding climax followed by a feel-good ending"; concluding that the novel is "unexceptional but solid."
