= Celandine (novel) =

2006 novel by Steve Augarde

- First edition cover
- Author: Steve Augarde
- Illustrator: Steve Augarde
- Language: English
- Series: Touchstone Trilogy
- Genre: Children's, young adult, fantasy, bildungsroman
- Publisher: David Fickling Books
- Publication date: 22 August 2006
- Publication place: United Kingdom
- Pages: 496
- ISBN: 978-0-385-75048-6
- LC Class: PZ7.A9125 Cel 2006
- Preceded by: The Various
- Followed by: Winter Wood

Celandine is a children's fantasy novel by Steve Augarde. It is the second book in the Touchstone Trilogy and was first published in 2006. Celandine is set ninety years before The Various, the first book of the trilogy. It follows the adventures of Celandine (born 1901) in the years 1914–1915, at the onset of World War I. Having run away from her detested boarding school, Celandine is too afraid to go home in case she is sent back. As she seeks shelter in the Wild Wood near her home, little does she think she will encounter a world where loyalty and independence is fiercely guarded, and where danger lurks in the most unlikely of places. Celandine's troubled character finds both refuge and purpose among the secret tribes of little people that she alone believes in.

== Plot summary ==
Celandine is running away from the boarding school she was sent to by her parents to ‘pound all of the nonsense out of her’. It is her third escape attempt, after being sent back twice by her parents. She boards a train and meets a crippled soldier who appears to be no older than her brother Freddie, who died as a volunteer soldier. She also meets a nurse who upon Celandine's departure from their company exclaims “Do you know that extraordinary looking girl?”

She returns to her home farm but does not wish to enter an angry confrontation with her father. Instead, she climbs the hill and signals a small child Celandine calls Fin to appear out of nowhere. Celandine was 10 when she first saw the “little people”, the first of whom was Fin and his guardian. When Celandine told others what she saw, no one but Freddie believed her.

== The Name Celandine ==
Celandine is named after a flowering medicinal herb. It may either be Greater celandine of the poppy family, or Lesser celandine, a buttercup. The plant figures in all three volumes of the trilogy, but it is not clear from the descriptions which of the two Steve Augarde has in mind.

== Characters ==
- Celandine Howard, who is the main character of book and heroine. She is mischievous and trouble loving, much to the distress of her parents and governess. Growing up rich, she is slightly spoiled and selfish, but her heart is tender. She has light colored, wild hair, but dark solemn eyes and eyebrows.
- Freddie (Wyndham Frederick) Howard, who is Celandine's older by three years and favorite brother. He is sensitive and unselfish but unendingly brave. He loves a good adventure and was the one to suggest searching for the mysterious “small people” that Celandine saw in the trees. He also adores Celandine. He has light frizzy hair that would be like Celandine's if allowed to grow out; and light-colored eyes.
- Thos (Thomas) Howard, who is Celandine's serious older by five years brother. He is quick tempered like his father. Dark eyes and hair.

== Printed Editions ==
- UK
  - Hardcover: Celandine, David Fickling Books 2005, ISBN 0-385-60562-5
  - Paperback: Celandine, Corgi 2006, ISBN 978-0-552-54968-4
- US
  - Hardcover: Celandine, David Fickling Books 2006, ISBN 978-0-385-75048-6
  - Paperback: Celandine, Yearling Books 2006, ISBN 978-0-440-42216-7

== Translations ==
- France
  - Paperback: Celandine, trans. Jean Esch, Editions Albin Michel 2012, ISBN 978-2-226-23886-3
- Germany
  - Hardcover: Der Elfenwald, trans. Ursula Höfker, Arena Verlag 2006, ISBN 978-3-401-05828-3
  - Paperback: Der Elfenwald, trans. Ursula Höfker, Arena Verlag 2009, ISBN 978-3-401-50102-4
  - Paperback: Der Elfenwald, trans. Ursula Höfker, Arena Verlag 2011, ISBN 978-3-401-50281-6
