= A Swift Pure Cry =

2006 novel by Siobhan Dowd

- First edition cover
- Author: Siobhan Dowd
- Language: English
- Genre: Young adult
- Publisher: David Fickling Books
- Publication date: 2 March 2006
- Publication place: United Kingdom
- Pages: 320
- ISBN: 978-0-385-60970-8
- OCLC: 62475200

A Swift Pure Cry is a 2006 novel by Siobhan Dowd about a teenager named Shell who lives in County Cork, Ireland. It won the 2007 Branford Boase Award and the Eilís Dillon Award.

== Plot summary ==
A Swift Pure Cry opens a year after the mother of fifteen-year-old Michelle "Shell" Talent dies, leaving her husband and three children to cope with her death. The eldest of the children, Shell is given the responsibility to care for her younger siblings as well as continue attending school as their father changes drastically.

When a new priest, Father Rose, comes to their village, Coolbar, Shell begins to believe once again in Jesus and in her mother's spirit. However, her father is also changed by religion; he quits his job to only collect money for church drives, leaving Shell and her family in poverty. At school, Shell's only friends are Declan, the altar boy, and Bridie, another misfit teen.

As Shell feels more and more isolated from normal family life, she becomes involved with Declan, who makes her promise not to tell anyone, so he can continue seeing Bridie as well. Unfortunately, Declan abandons both girls for America, leaving Shell pregnant and alone. She manages to hide the pregnancy from her father and gives birth to a stillborn child around Christmas, whom she names Rose, for the priest.

Around the same time, another baby is found dead, killed by exposure, and Shell is under suspicion of abandoning her child. The town is in an uproar, as is the rest of Ireland, and Shell finds comfort in Father Rose's help. However, Father Rose believes Shell's father to be the baby's father and the town folk believes that Father Rose is the father.

In the end, it is revealed that Bridie was also pregnant from Declan and gave birth around the same time as Shell, but her child survived. Faced with pressure and despair, she left her child outside to die. Concluding, Shell returns to school and Father Rose is transferred to another location in Ireland for training.

== Characters ==
Shell: The fifteen-year-old main character of A Swift Pure Cry. She is intelligent, but unmotivated and is often bitter about her father's role in the family. She misses her mother and maintains religious behavior.

Trix: Shell's younger sister who attends a primary school along with Jimmy. She is very innocent and childlike, enjoying games and songs, while at the same time capable of acting mature for her age.

Jimmy: Shell's younger brother, age nine. Jimmy has his mother's talent for playing music, but is very hot-tempered at times. He, like Trix, can handle situations that are dangerous.

Mr. Talent: Shell's father. He used to be a level-headed man. However, when his wife died, he fell into alcoholism and religious collecting. Because of his alcoholic habits, he believes that he is Shell's child's father.

Father Rose: The young, twenty-five-year-old priest, new to Coolbar. He is described as having a friendly and personal manner, while at the same time able to seriously discuss religion and Christianity. The town folk do not trust him completely and find his way of teaching suspect. Because of this, his relationship with Shell is often strained.

Bridie: Shell's teenage friend. Birdie is considered to be a rebel in the school, but an outcast too. She steals regularly from the town's stores and also smokes. She also is having sex with Declan and possibly runs away to Cork. She is pregnant and it is her baby in the cave. However, she also has a big falling out with Shell.

Declan: The slightly older altar boy from Coolbar that Shell engages in a relationship. He is cheerful and playful, with a knack for creating mini poems. After sleeping with Shell for several months, he leaves her for America, where he eventually remembers Shell and writes to her. He is a player, having sex with Bridie and Shell.

Rose: Shell's stillborn baby, named after Father Rose. Half sister of the baby in the cave.

== Awards ==
- Eilís Dillon Award for "first-time children's author"
- Branford Boase Award
- Sheffield Children's Book Award
- Shortlisted for 2007 Carnegie Medal
- Shortlisted for 2006 Booktrust Teenage Prize and the Waterstone's Children's Book Prize
- Longlisted for Guardian Children's Fiction Prize
- "25 authors of the future" by Waterstones Books

== Inspiration ==
According to the author's website, A Swift Pure Cry was inspired by two separate incidents in Ireland. The first event occurred in 1984 when a fifteen-year-old girl, Ann Lovett, died from blood loss and exposure while trying to give birth on her own. Critics blamed her death on the town folk who failed to give her guidance and aid. The second incident (Kerry Babies) involved a woman in her 20s giving birth to a child, rumoured to be the result of an affair with a married man, and a baby being found stabbed to death around the same time. As in A Swift Pure Cry, controversy arose over whether the woman killed her child and if she did not, who the second child belonged to.

== Translations ==
- French: Sans un cri, lit. 'Without a Cry'. Translated by Cécile Dutheil de la Rochère. Paris: Gallimard. 2007. ISBN 9782070573356.
- German: Ein reiner Schrei. Translated by Salah Naoura. Zürich: Hier und Jetzt. 2007. ISBN 9783551358615.
- Italian: La carne di un angelo, lit. 'The Flesh of an Angel'. Translated by Alessandro Peroni. Florence: Salani. 2008. ISBN 9788884518538.
- Swedish: Ett hastigt rent rop. Translated by Helena Ridelberg. Umeå: Atrium Förlag. 2019. ISBN 9789186095864.
