= Sedgman =

Sedgman is a surname. Notable people with the surname include:

- Alethea Sedgman (born 1994), Australian sport shooter
- Frank Sedgman (born 1927), Australian tennis player
- Sam Sedgman (born 1987), English children's author
