= The Various =

2003 children's fantasy novel by Steve Augarde

- First edition cover
- Author: Steve Augarde
- Illustrator: Steve Augarde
- Language: English
- Series: Touchstone Trilogy
- Genre: Children's
- Publisher: David Fickling Books
- Publication date: 7 August 2003
- Publication place: United Kingdom
- Pages: 452 pp
- ISBN: 978-0-385-60474-1
- OCLC: 52324461
- Followed by: Celandine

The Various is a 2003 children's fantasy novel written and illustrated by Steve Augarde. It is the first book of the Touchstone Trilogy which continues with Celandine and Winter Wood. The trilogy tells the story of the hidden tribes of little people who live in a tangled forest on a hill in Somerset, and their interactions with the children at the farm on whose land the hill stands. The tribes, who call themselves the 'Various', live difficult, self-sufficient lives, always in fear of discovery by the 'Gorji', or giants, as they call the humans who now dominate the countryside.

The Various won the Nestlé Smarties Book Prize Bronze Award, was shortlisted for the Branford Boase Award and was nominated for the Carnegie Medal.

== Plot summary ==
Eleven-year old Margaret Walters, better known as Midge, is sent to stay with her Uncle Brian at Mill Farm in Somerset, England while her mother is on tour with the orchestra. She stumbles across secrets and things that have been kept from her about her childhood, which makes her wonder about where she came from. While exploring, she comes across a small winged horse named Pegs, which is trapped and injured in a barn, which is her first introduction to the hidden world of the "Royal Forest", an impenetrable thicket on a hill within the farm boundaries. Midge manages to rescue Pegs and nurses him back to health. Meanwhile, all the tribes who live in the forest, the Ickri, Naiad, Wisp, Troggles and Tinklers, unite to send a group to search for the missing horse, Pegs. The adventures of the group demonstrate the dangers posed to the Various by the Gorji world, as humans are called by the tribes, and one of them, Lumst, is killed by a ferocious tomcat named Tojo.

While Midge is accepted by the ickri Queen Ba-betts and her advisers as the savior of Pegs, despite the news she brings of her uncle's plan to sell the forest land. Meanwhile, an archer captain, Scurl, believes that she is herself a danger to the tribes and intends to kill her. Scurl and his archers, Snerk, Dregg, and Fitch, attack Mill Farm when Midge and her cousins, Katie and George, are home alone. Maglin, an ickri steward serving under Ba-Betts, finds out of Scurl's scheme and banishes him and the other archers from the royal forest.

Midge senses another presence, which is linked to a picture of her Great-great Aunt Celandine, who was around her age when she was said to be mad because she saw the Various, which nobody else ever knew about. Celandine's experience with the Various, nearly seventy to ninety years before the main story takes place, is told in Celandine, the sequel to The Various. Midge and Celandine's close bond is explored in Winter Wood.

== Characters ==
The humans, or Gorji

- Margaret Walters, known as Midge, an 11-year-old London girl
- Christine, her mother, a professional musician, second violin in an orchestra
- Brian, Christine's brother, Midge's uncle, an unsuccessful farmer
- Katie, Brian's daughter, Midge's cousin
- George, Brian's son, Midge's cousin

The Various

- Pegs, a Naiad winged horse
- Glim the archer, of the Ickri
- Ba-betts, Ickri Queen of the Various
- Maglin, Ickri General
- Scurl, captain of the South and West Wood archers
- Little-Marten, young Ickri drummer ('Woodpecker')
- Tadgemole, leader of the underground tribes, the Troggles and Tinklers
- Henty, Tadgemole's beautiful daughter
- Maven-the-Green, an ancient hag
- Grissel, Ickri hunter, one of the group sent to look for Pegs
- Spindra, Naiad horse-breeder, one of the group sent to look for Pegs
- Tod, Wisp fisher, one of the group sent to look for Pegs
- Lumst, Troggle miner, one of the group sent to look for Pegs
- Pank, Tinkler smith, one of the group sent to look for Pegs

== Reception ==
- Kirkus: "After a slow-moving start, through an impenetrably dense thicket of pseudo-Victorian language, Augarde's story finally picks up to a suspenseful if incomplete conclusion."
- Locus: "The scenario is pretty standard, but Augarde works in plenty of distinctive details about both the Various and Midge's family to keep things lively and involving."
- The Guardian: "For all that adults might find to admire in it, it is nevertheless a big, generous children's book."
- New York Times: "long on atmospherics and rolls along at an unhurried pace that might test the patience of more jaded young readers."
