= M. G. Leonard =

English children's writer

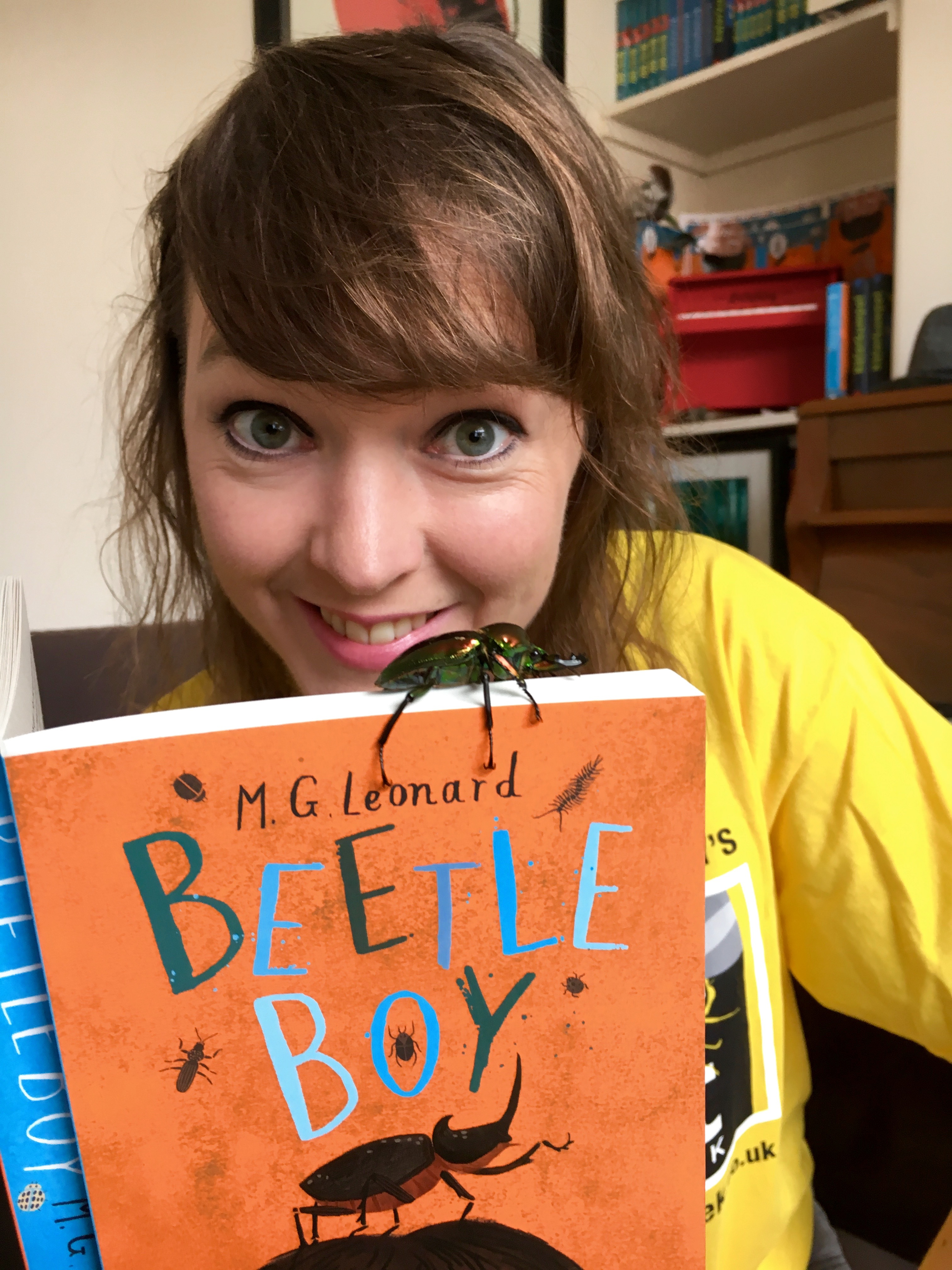
- Born: Maya Gabrielle; Torquay, Devon, England
- Occupation: Writer
- Writing career
- Genre: Children's literature
- Notable works: Beetle Boy trilogy Adventures on Trains series
- Notable awards: 2017 Branford Boase Award; 2021 Sainsbury's Children's Book Award; CrimeFest Award for Best Crime Novel for Children

Maya Gabrielle Leonard is an English writer specializing in children's literature. She is known for blending adventure and ecological themes. She writes under her pen name to fulfill a promise made to her eldest son to use his middle name (Leonard) as a pen surname. She is recognized for her critically acclaimed Beetle Boy trilogy and Adventures on Trains series.

== Early life and education ==
Leonard was born in Torquay, Devon. She studied English literature, earning a first-class honors degree and an MA in Shakespeare Studies from King's College London. Her early career was rooted in the music industry, where Leonard managed bands like The Divine Comedy and ran Setanta Records, an independent label. She later transitioned to digital media production roles with the National Theatre and Shakespeare's Globe.

== Career and writing ==
Leonard transitioned from acting to writing, publishing her first book, Beetle Boy, in 2016. The novel, part of her Beetle trilogy, became a bestseller, noted for its imaginative portrayal of beetles as companions to humans and its ecological themes. Beetle Boy won the 2017 Branford Boase Award and multiple other honors and will be adapted for television.

Leonard has also co-authored the Adventures on Trains series with Sam Sedgman, which gained acclaim for its innovative setting of mystery stories aboard trains. The series includes award-winning titles such as The Highland Falcon Thief, which received the 2020 British Book Award for Children's Fiction. The books have been optioned for a film franchise.

In 2020, it was announced that Tom MacRae is adapting Beetle Boy for a live-action/CGI returnable series, with Buccaneer co-producing. Framestore has also been attached to the project.

In September 2024, it was announced that Macmillan Children's Books had secured the rights to a new middle-grade series by Leonard, Time Keys, in a six-figure, four-book deal. The series will debut with Hunt for the Golden Scarab.

== Awards and recognition ==
- 2017 Branford Boase Award (for Beetle Boy)
- 2021 Sainsbury's Children's Book Award (for Twitch)
- CrimeFest Award for Best Crime Novel for Children (for Twitch)

Her books have been translated into over 40 languages, and her contributions extend to conservation as one of the founders of #Authors4Oceans, which advocates for reduced plastic waste.

== Bibliography ==
=== Beetle trilogy ===
- Beetle Boy (2016)
- Beetle Queen (2017)
- Battle of the Beetles (2018)

=== Adventures on Trains series ===
Co-authored with Sam Sedgman

- The Highland Falcon Thief (2020)
- Kidnap on the California Comet (2020)
- Murder on the Safari Star (2021)
- Danger at Dead Man's Pass (2021)
- Sabotage on the Solar Express (2022)
- The Arctic Railway Assassin (2022)

=== The Twitchers series ===
- Twitch (2021)
- Spark (2022)
- Clutch (2023)
- Feather (2024)

=== Time Keys series ===
- Hunt for the Golden Scarab
- The Legend of Viking Thunder
- The Impossible Gladiator
- Attack of the Sea Dogs

=== Other books ===
- The Ice Children
- The Adventures of Portly the Otter (2026)
