= Tony Mitton =

British poet and children's writer (1951–2022)

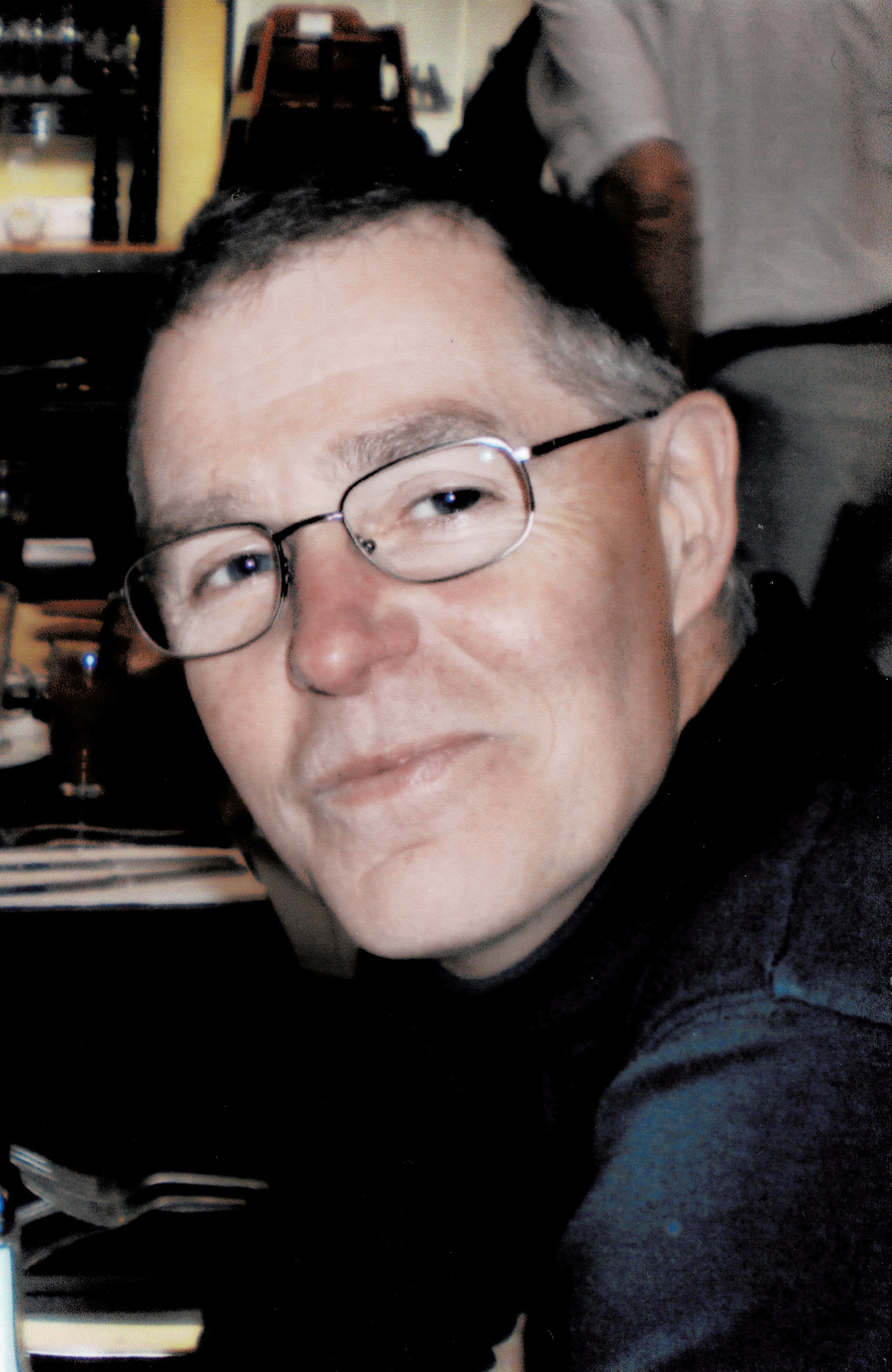
- Born: 10 January 1951; Tripoli, Libya
- Died: 18 June 2022 (aged 71); Cambridge, England
- Education: Gonville and Caius College, Cambridge
- Occupations: Poet; Children's Writer
- Notable work: Plum (2003); Wayland (2013)
- Website: www.tonymitton.co.uk

Anthony Robert Mitton (10 January 1951 – 18 June 2022) was an English writer. Originally a primary school teacher, he then became a children's poetry writer.

== Personal life and education ==
Mitton was born on 10 January 1951 in Tripoli, Libya. He was educated at Woolverstone Hall School (1961–1968), before studying English at Gonville and Caius College, Cambridge from 1969. Subsequently, he trained as a primary school teacher in the mid-1970s. He lived with his wife in Cambridge, where they raised two children. He died of leukaemia in 2022, at the age of 71.

== Professional career ==
His career as a teacher included positions as Support Teacher in Plaistow, then a full-time primary teaching post at Earith CP School near Cambridge from 1980. In 1984, after a short gap, he resumed primary school teaching as a registered supply teacher for Cambridgeshire Education Authority. In 1987, he became a permanent part-time special needs support teacher for the Cambridgeshire Special Needs Team, continuing in this post for about 15 years. In 1994, some of his first poems for children were published.

== Honours and other notable activities ==
Tony Mitton won the 2014 Centre for Literacy in Primary Education (CLPE) poetry award (now called CLIPPA) for the poem "Wayland". Before that, he won the Nottinghamshire Children's Book Award, 1997, for "Royal Raps" and the silver award at the 2000 Nestlé Smarties Book Prize (book cited below). He served as a judge for the CLPE poetry award in 2005 and 2006. His work has been included in the Children's Poetry Archive. It has also been included in anthologies such as the OUP-published Kersplosh, Kersplash, Kersplat! Funny Poems. edited by Ron Heapy. Mitton collaborated with the Hallé Orchestra, who made adaptations of several of Mitton's works (for example, their productions of "Dinosaurumpus" and "Gaia"). "Dinosaurumpus" has also been performed by the Welsh National Opera. Mitton was a Member of the Society of Authors. His archive is held by the National Centre for Children's Books in Newcastle. His first full length novel, Potter's Boy, was published in 2017.

== Reviews ==
Mitton's work has been independently reviewed in many places. For example, one of his earlier books was reviewed in The New York Times in 1999. Other reviews have appeared in Kirkus Reviews, in 2002 and 2003, as well as in the School Library Journal. 2007. Writing in The Guardian newspaper, Julia Eccleshare said in October 2003: "Tony Mitton's The Tale of Tales, illustrated by Peter Bailey (David Fickling Books, £12.99) is a wonderful piece of storytelling told seamlessly in prose and poetry which, in the best tradition of The Canterbury Tales, shows what an excellent storytelling vehicle poetry can be." Mitton was named by Teresa Cremin (2013) as someone whose work that has inspired reluctant readers. Many more reviews are listed in the Encyclopedia.com article cited above (towards the end, in the section "Biographical and Critical Sources"). Wayland was reviewed in The Times in 2013: "it is a delight to find a new picture book that should stand the test of time. The story of the craftsman Wayland, gorgeously retold by the award-winning poet Tony Mitton, makes the hairs on your neck rise up." Mitton was featured in "Books for Keeps" in 2014, "Authorgraph No.208: Tony Mitton" by Nikki Gamble, as well as in a profile in the Oxford Student in 2017. In the obituary in Poetry Nation /PN Review (267, Volume 49 Number 1), Geoffrey Pawling called him "one of Britain’s most popular and versatile children's poets".

== Books ==
Mitton's most notable, prize-winning books and poems include:

The Red and White Spotted Handkerchief: silver award at the 2000 Nestlé Smarties Book Prize.

In 2005, his verse picture book with Guy Parker-Rees, Spookyrumpus, won The Sheffield Children's Book Award, The Dundee City of Discovery Picture Book Award and The Portsmouth Picture Book award. His comic rap narrative book, Royal Raps (illus. Martin Chatterton), won the Nottinghamshire Children's Book Award in 1996.

- The Red and White Spotted Handkerchief. Illustrated by Peter Bailey. Scholastic. 2000. ISBN 0590543539.
- Plum. Illustrated by Mary Grandpré (2nd ed.). Arthur A. Levine Books. 2003. ISBN 0439364094.
- Royal Raps. Illustrated by Martin Chatterton (2nd ed.). Orchard Books. 2004. ISBN 1843627558.
- Spookyrumpus. Illustrated by Guy Parker-Rees. Orchard Books. 2005. ISBN 184362608X.
- Wayland. Illustrated by John Lawrence. David Fickling Books. 2013. ISBN 978-0857560148.
- Potter's Boy. La Vergne: David Fickling Books Ltd. 2017. ISBN 978-1-910989-34-0.

His work has been translated into many languages. See VIAF listing.

More complete listings of Mitton's works are included on the CLPE author page and the Open library author page.
