= X Isle =

2009 novel by Steve Augarde

- Front cover of first edition
- Author: Steve Augarde
- Language: English
- Genre: Young adult
- Published: 2009 (David Fickling Books)
- Media type: Print (Hardcover, Paperback) e-Book (Kindle); Audio Book (CD)
- ISBN: 0-385-75193-1

X Isle is a young adult novel by Steve Augarde first published in 2009. It is set in the future, after floods have destroyed civilization. The novel follows the experiences of a boy named Baz on his arrival at "X Isle" from the equally miserable "mainland". The book has been nominated for the Carnegie Medal.

== Plot ==
The world has been washed away in the aftermath of global devastation from floods. Mainland survivors trade goods with people from Eck's Isle who occasionally take back boys with them. Two boys from the mainland, Baz and Ray, are chosen and leave with the boat to the supposed better life.

But when they get to the island they discover conditions are harsh for the boys and that Preacher John, the head of the Eck family is a religious fanatic. After some of the work boys die and Preacher John's sermons start emphasising sacrifices to God, they decide to build a bomb and destroy the boat then return to the mainland by dinghy.

The bomb is planted on the boat but the next day Ray has gone missing, Baz will be going on the boat and the crew has decided to take the dinghy with them, leaving some to guard the boys.

On the boat, Preacher John makes Baz pray to God, his eldest son, Isaac, then intervenes and threatens to shoot his father who tells him that he planned to kill him as the ultimate sacrifice to God. Preacher John then shoots him and throws Baz overboard who lands in the dinghy. He then causes the bomb to explode, sinking the boat.

Baz manages to return to Eck's Isle, Ray reappears and after fighting with the remaining adults let them return to the mainland by the dinghy. The youngsters decide to stay and make a life on the island.

== Reception ==
Patrick Ness of the Guardian said that 'X Isle is a strong tale, well told, if perhaps lacking quite enough incident to fill 477 pages... It's a surprisingly upbeat story that boys should like.'
