= Girl, Stolen =

2010 novel by April Henry

Girl Stolen
- Author: April Henry
- Language: English
- Subject: Crime/mystery
- Genre: Young adult fiction
- Set in: Oregon
- Published: 13 March 2010
- Publication place: America
- Media type: Print
- Pages: 213
- ISBN: 9780312674755

Girl Stolen is a young adult crime novel by the American author April Henry, published in 2010 by Henry Holt and Company. It follows Cheyenne, a 16-year-old girl who is blind, has pneumonia, and is accidentally kidnapped when a stranger steals her mother's car while Cheyenne is resting in the backseat.

== Plot ==
Girl, Stolen is about Cheyenne Wilder, a 16-year-old girl who is blind and has pneumonia. Cheyenne is waiting in her stepmother's car while she's in a pharmacy when a teenage boy, Griffin, steals her stepmother's vehicle, unaware that Cheyenne is curled up in the backseat. Griffin contemplates setting Cheyenne free but decides against it and drives her home to a rundown trailer. There, his father, who is a carjacker, learns about the mishap, as well as Cheyenne's father's wealth, and decides turn this error into a ransom opportunity. However, once he realizes that Cheyenne may be able to identify him and his cronies, he contemplates killing her after he receives the ransom.

Cheyenne, overcome by her pneumonia, must win over Griffin to release her. Although Griffin believes his father will release Cheyenne once they receive the ransom, but Cheyenne isn't so sure. Instead, she decides to knock out Griffin and try her luck running through the woods. Unfortunately, Roy catches her, and in another attempt, she must drive his car to escape.

== Reception ==
Publishers Weekly called Girl, Stolen "a captivating tale", while Children's Book and Media Review's Debbie Barr referred to it as "a masterful story, full of suspense, subtlety, and surprise."

April Spisak, writing for The Bulletin of the Center for Children's Books, referred to the premise as "powerfully realistic and compelling, with one small incident [...] snowballing into a nightmare series of events that will change everyone". Spisak continued, "The pace is impeccable, becoming rapidly more frantic as Cheyenne realizes her chances for success are dwindling". Booklist's Daniel Kraus similarly highlighted the novel's "hurtling, downhill velocity". However, Kira Moody, writing for School Library Journal, found that "the book drags in places".

Multiple reviewers discussed Henry's character development, with Kraus writing, "The plot is actually of secondary concern; the relationship between Cheyenne and [...] Griffin, constitutes the novel’s central push and pull". Publishers Weekly noted that both Cheyenne and Griffin "are well-built, complex characters, trapped in their own ways by life's circumstances". Barr specifically described Griffin as "complex and sympathetic".

Reviewers were particularly impressed with how Henry handled Cheyenne's disability, with Kraus noting that Henry's "research on living with blindness pays dividends in authenticity". Kirkus Reviews found that Henry's "realistic depiction of the coping strategies and the strengths developed by the blind greatly enhances the novel, lifting it above the level of a mere escapist thriller". Spisak and Publishers Weekly pointed to examples of Cheyenne using her illness and disability to try to manipulate Griffin, as well as a way to bond with him. Some reviewers also discussed the limited focus Henry placed on Cheyenne's blindness in the novel. Spisak wrote, "Henry ably presents Cheyenne's blindness as an aspect that is no more relevant than, for example, her pneumonia as an obstacle in her current horrific situation." However, Moody argued that "the disability of the main character occasionally overshadows the story".

Kirkus Reviews concluded, "Although Cheyenne's multiple problems might feel overdone in less skilled hands, Henry handles them deftly and makes her choices work. Constantly interesting and suspenseful."

Moody reviewed the audiobook and praised narrator Kate Rudd for "bringing to life the different characters".

== Accolades ==
The American Library Association included Girl, Stolen on their 2011 list of the Best Fiction for Young Adults.
