= Sally Prue =

British author

- Education: Longdean School
- Writing career
- Language: Novelist
- Notable work: Cold Tom
- Notable awards: Branford Boase Award (2002); Nestlé Smarties Book Prize (2002)

Sally Prue is a British author known for her novel Cold Tom, which won the Branford Boase Award 2002 and the Smarties Prize Silver Award in 2002. Sally Prue has written eight novels.

== Biography ==
Sally Prue was adopted as a baby and brought up in Hertfordshire, England. She attended Nash Mills and Longdean Schools, and afterwards she began to work at a paper mill with the rest of her family.

Her first real job was as a clerk and following that as a time and motion person. She was forced to quit the job due to pregnancy with her first daughter. She has two daughters, Elizabeth and Rosalind.

Bringing up her children, she gradually became better at writing fiction and hired an agent, Elizabeth Roy. Cold Tom, her first novel, won two awards: Branford Boase Award and the Smarties Prize Silver Award in 2002. Later published novels include The Devil's Toenail (2004) and Ryland's Footsteps (2004). The Truth Sayer (2007), the first in a trilogy, was nominated for the 2007 Guardian Award.

== Bibliography ==
=== Standalone novels ===
- Song Hunter (2013)
- Cold Tom (2002)
- The Devil's Toenail (2002)
- Ryland's Footsteps (2003)
- Goldkeeper (2004)
- The Path of Finn McCool (2004)
- James and the Alien Experiment (2005)
- Wheels of War (2009)
- Ice Maiden (2011)
- Class Six and the Nits of Doom (2014)

=== The Truth Sayer Trilogy ===
- The Truth Sayer (2007)
- March of the Owlmen (2008)
- Plague of Mondays (2009)
