= L. S. Matthews =

British children's author (pen name of Laura Dron)

L. S. Matthews (born 29 August 1964) is the pen name of Laura Dron, a British children's author of several critically acclaimed novels.

== Background ==
She was born near Dudley in Worcestershire, (now West Midlands) in England, youngest of five children of parents from the South West who had moved to the industrial area for work. She attended state school there, leaving at 18 to study English literature at Goldsmiths College, University of London, where she gained a first class honours degree.

Matthews lived and worked in London for six years and has also lived in Hull in Northern England, the West Midlands, Alsace in Northern France and Hertfordshire.

Matthews currently resides in Dorset with her husband and two children.

== Publications ==
Her first novel, Fish (2003), won the Fidler Award and was also Highly Commended for the Branford Boase Award and nominated for a Carnegie Medal. Her other novels are The Outcasts (2004), A Dog For Life (2006), Lexi (2007) and After the Flood (2008). Matthews also wrote two short SEN titles, Deadly Night and The Game, which were both published in 2006.

All titles are published by Hodder & Stoughton.
