= The Gideon Trilogy =

Book series by Linda Buckley-Archer

- First edition cover of Gideon the Cutpurse
- Author: Linda Buckley-Archer
- Language: English
- Series: The Gideon Trilogy
- Genre: Children's
- Publisher: Simon & Schuster
- Publication date: 5 June 2006
- Publication place: United Kingdom
- Pages: 384
- ISBN: 978-1-4169-1655-0
- OCLC: 64555644

The Gideon Trilogy is a 2006 science fiction book series by Linda Buckley-Archer. This series has also been called The Enlightenment of Peter Schock.

== Plot introduction ==
The novel focuses on the adventures of Peter Schock and Kate Dyer in 1763 after being accidentally teleported there by an antigravity machine while chasing Molly, Kate's dog.

== Plot summary ==
Gideon Seymour, cutpurse and gentleman, hides from the villainous Tar Man. Suddenly the sky peels away like fabric and from the gaping hole fall two curious-looking children. Peter Schock and Kate Dyer have fallen straight from the twenty-first century, thanks to an experiment with an antigravity machine. Before Gideon and the children have a chance to gather their wits, the Tar Man takes off with the machine—and Kate and Peter's only chance of getting home. Soon Gideon, Kate, and Peter are swept into a journey through eighteenth-century London and form a bond that, they hope, will stand strong in the face of unfathomable treachery.

== Reception ==
The Time Travellers has been praised for its excellent description of everyday living conditions in 18th-century England, while also being an enlightening read for children.

Susan Shaver reviewing for Library Media Connection said that the novel was "full of wonderful description, unique historical English terminology, and lots of British flavor, the events of the first book in this time-travel trilogy will surely captivate and hold young readers." Melissa Moore reviewing for the School Library Journal praised the novel saying "history interweaves with science, social issues in both centuries are thrown in; yet what readers will remember most is a fast-paced plot with a cliff-hanger ending and multidimensional characters who continue to inhabit their thoughts long after the book is closed. With appeal for reluctant and advanced readers, this novel is a rare gem." Kristi Elle Jemtegaard reviewing the audiobook for Horn Book Magazine described it as "breakneck plotting, pungent descriptions studded with vivid period details (like the carpet of lice on the floor of Newgate prison), and the desperate plight of the two children trapped in another century give Doyle ample opportunity to display his dramatic skills. The last-minute change of heart that sets up the sequel in the final moments will leave listeners anxious for more." Gideon the Cutpurse was shortlisted for the 2007 Branford Boase Award.

== The Time Thief ==
Kate and Peter's father try to rescue Peter, but land in 1792, 29 years forward. Meanwhile, the Tar Man is getting used to the twenty- first century. The Tar Man finds a guide in the twenty- first century, a girl named Anjali. Tom also arrives in the twenty- first century (due to the time machine) and is found by the Tar Man. A shocking connection is discovered of two enemies. The book ends with a cliffhanger, and the time quakes have begun.

== Time Quake ==
Kate and Peter try to get back to the present with the help of Gideon; and inexplicably, the Tar Man. Meanwhile, Lord Luxon tries to change history for America to still be in British power by murdering president George Washington. Kate is growing more transparent each day until she completely disappears, taking Lord Luxon with her. In the end, Peter, Gideon, and Nathaniel go back to the first time traveling event and stop it. The Peter and Gideon once known cease to exist and everything goes back to normal. Before Gideon and Nathaniel disappear, they destroy the anti-gravity. Yet, they leave behind a few mysteries.
