= April Henry =

American author (born 1959)

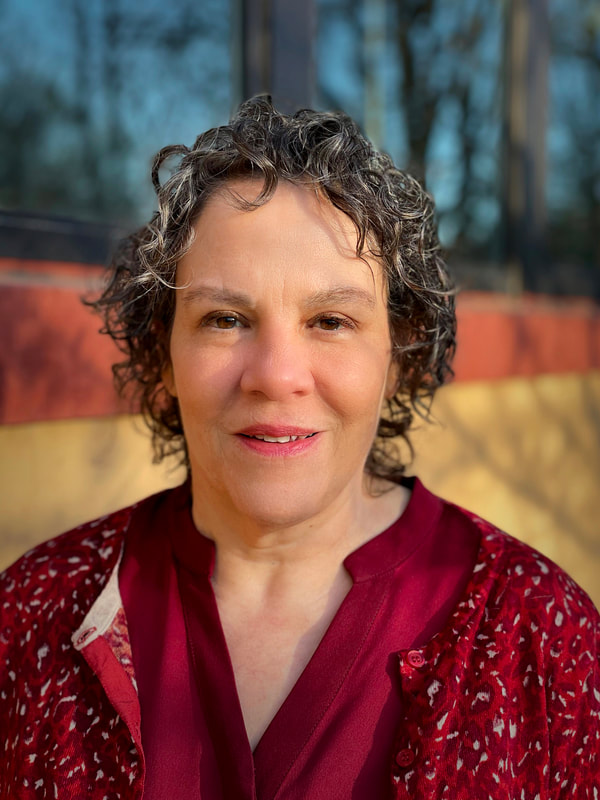
- April Henry in 2021
- Born: April 14, 1959 (age 67); Medford, Oregon, U.S.
- Occupation: Author
- Writing career
- Language: English
- Years active: 1999-present
- Genres: Mystery fiction; Thriller
- Website: aprilhenry.com

April Henry (born April 14, 1959) is an American New York Times bestselling author of mysteries, thrillers, and young adult novels.

== Early life ==
Born in Portland, Oregon, April 14, 1959, Henry grew up in the small southern Oregon city of Medford where her father, Hank Henry, was a KTVL television newscaster, and her mother, Nora Henry, was a florist.

== Career ==
Author Roald Dahl helped April Henry take her first step as a writer. When Henry was twelve, she sent Dahl a short story about a frog who loved peanut butter. Dahl had lunch with the editor of an international children's magazine and read her the story. The editor contacted her and asked to publish her story.

In 1999, Henry's first book, Circles of Confusion, was published by HarperCollins. It was short-listed for the Agatha Award and the Anthony Award. It was also chosen for the Booksense 76 list, and The Oregonian Book Club, and was a Mystery Guild Editor's Choice.

Henry's first stand-alone thriller, Learning to Fly, was published by St. Martin's Press in 2002. It was a Booksense pick, got starred reviews in Library Journal and Booklist, was named one of Library Journal's Best of 2002, and was a finalist for the Oregon Book Award. Shock Point, Henry's first young-adult thriller, was published by Putnam in 2006. It was ALA Quick Pick, a Top 10 Books for Teens nominee, a New York Library's Books for the Teen Age book, named to the Texas Tayshas list, and a finalist for Philadelphia's Young Readers Choice Award. Her next young-adult book, Torched, a thriller about a girl who goes undercover in an environmental extremist group, was published in 2009. Girl, Stolen, a young-adult thriller about a blind girl who is accidentally kidnapped by a car thief, was released by Henry Holt in October 2010. In April 2011, Henry found the blind girl whose brief kidnapping inspired Girl, Stolen. Their story was featured in Publishers Weekly.

In 2009, April Henry partnered with Lis Wiehl to collaborate on the Triple Threat Mystery series. The first book in the series, Face of Betrayal, was on the New York Times best-seller list for four weeks.

April Henry’s 2016 book, The Girl I Used to Be, was a finalist for the Edgar Award and won the Anthony Award in 2017. It was named to state award lists in Texas, Iowa, Missouri, Indiana, Nebraska, South Dakota, Iowa, and South Carolina.

April Henry had two books published in 2019. The Lonely Dead, was a YALSA Quick Pick for Reluctant Readers.

Her 2020 book, The Girl in the White Van, was a YALSA Quick Pick for Reluctant Readers and a finalist for Ohio’s Buckeye Award.

In 2021, April Henry had two books published, Playing with Fire and Eyes of the Forest. Eyes of the Forest appeared on state lists in Georgia, Missouri, and South Dakota.

2022 brought Two Truths and a Lie, which was chosen by the Junior Library Guild as a Gold Standard selection and was an Amazon Editor’s Choice for Best Young Adult. YALSA named it to the 2023 Top Ten Quick Picks for Reluctant Young Adult Readers. It received Ohio’s Teen Buckeye Book Award, 2023, Grades 9-12, and was named to Pennsylvania’s Best of 2022.

April Henry’s 2023 book was Girl Forgotten, which won the 2024 Edgar award for best young adult.It was also chosen by the Junior Library Guild as a Gold Standard selection, was a finalist for awards in Delaware and Maine, was named to the Arizona Grand Canyon Reader Award list and won the Oregon Spirit Book Award.

2024 brought Stay Dead, which has been named to state lists in California, Missouri, Texas, Maine, Indiana, and Iowa.

In 2025, When We Go Missing was published, and 2026 will see the publication of In The Blood.

== Bibliography ==
=== Claire Montrose series ===
- Circles of Confusion (1999)
- Square in the Face (2000)
- Heart-Shaped Box (2001)
- Buried Diamonds (2003)

=== Triple Threat series ===
Co-authored with Lis Wiehl

- Face of Betrayal (2009)
- Hand of Fate (2010)
- Heart of Ice (2011)
- Eyes of Justice (2012)

=== Mia Quinn series ===
Co-authored with Lis Wiehl

- A Matter of Trust (2013)
- A Deadly Business (2014)
- Lethal Beauty (2015)

=== Point Last Seen series ===
- The Body in the Woods (2014)
- Blood Will Tell (2015)

=== Girl, Stolen series ===
- Girl, Stolen (2010)
- Count All Her Bones (2017)

=== Standalone novels ===
- Learning to Fly (2002)
- Shock Point (2006)
- Breakout (2007)
- Torched (2009)
- The Night She Disappeared (2012)
- The Girl Who Was Supposed to Die (2013)
- The Girl I Used to Be (2016)
- The Lonely Dead (2019)
- Run, Hide, Fight Back (2019)
- The Girl in the White Van (2020)
- Playing with Fire (2021)
- Eyes of the Forest (2021)
- Two Truths And A Lie (2022)
- Girl Forgotten (2023)
- Stay Dead (2024)
- When We Go Missing (2025)
- In the Blood (2026)

=== Public Engagement ===
April Henry is a well known speaker, who travels all over the country speaking at schools about the importance of writing, reading, and research.
