= Cold Tom =

2002 fantasy novel by Sally Prue

- Author: Sally Prue
- Language: English
- Genre: Fantasy novel
- Publisher: Oxford University Press
- Publication date: 31 January 2002
- Publication place: United Kingdom
- Media type: Print (Hardcover, Paperback)
- Pages: 160 pp (first edition, paperback)
- ISBN: 0-19-271887-8
- OCLC: 48066457

Cold Tom is a young adult fantasy novel by British author Sally Prue, published in 2002 by Oxford University Press. In 2002, the novel won the Branford Boase Award and the Smarties Prize Silver Award.

== Plot summary ==
Tom is an elf who lives with his tribe in the woods away from the "demons" in the city. He is treated with contempt due to his clumsiness and poor hearing. Tom is aware his hearing and sight appear to be going. He almost allows a group of demons to discover the tribe and fearful runs away to the demon city, which is in fact a city of humans and is soon discovered by a young "demon" named Anna. Tom begins to quickly resent the girl, thinking that she is stubby, loud, stupid, and dumb. Also, he cannot understand Anna's attachment to her family and pet, Sophie. In essence, Anna represents everything the elves are not: ungraceful and loving. Tom, like all of the other elves, does not care about other people or animals, but simply about surviving. Later, when Tom meets Anna's half brother, Joe, things grow worse. The emotionally hardened and distant Joe sees to testing Tom's abilities. At first, Joe just tests Tom's weight and body temperature, which is under freezing. But, Joe then becomes fascinated with Tom's elfin ability to become invisible by calling on the stars. When Joe forces Tom to try to become invisible while Tom is in a weakened conditions, the tool shed Tom has been living in bursts up in flames. Tom flees, but does not get far. He is found by Anna and Joe's snooping neighbor, Edie. Edie takes Tom into her home, though he resents her help. She puts up charms to keep the murderous Tribe from Tom. Despite her protection, Tom still feels that he is going to die. Each day he finds himself growing weaker and more unlike himself. With help from Anna and Joe, Tom is able to escape from Edie's home, but he then feels back into the forests of the elves. He is met by his elfin father, Larn. Larn pierces him with a spear. Anna, Joe, and Edie find Tom dying in the woods. Edie seems aloof to this fact and tells Anna and Joe to forget about him. Joe, fascinated by an elf woman nearby, does nearly this. Anna, on the other hand, stays by Tom and tries to help him get better. It is her persistence that saves Tom from dying and helps Tom turn completely human. In the end, Edie turns out to be Tom's once-elfin aunt, Edrin. She was an outcast just as Tom was and tries to help him understand why he was different from the other elves. Anna and Joe also stay by and try to help Tom learn to be human. In the end, Tom seems accepting of the fact that he has given up the beauty of the elf world for the closeness of the human world.
