= Leslie Wilson (author) =

England-born author

Leslie Wilson is an England-born author of novels and short stories for adults and children.

She was born in 1952 in Nottingham to a German mother and an English father. She studied German at Durham University (St Aidan's College), graduating in 1974 with a 2:1 degree. Her mixed-heritage upbringing in England in the years following the Second World War is a major influence on her writing. Leslie Wilson has lived in England, Germany and Hong Kong and now lives in Berkshire with a husband and a dog. She has two daughters and a grandson.

== Awards and nominations ==
Saving Rafael was nominated for the Carnegie Medal, and shortlisted for the Lancashire Book of the Year Award and the Southern Schools Book Award.

Last Train for Kummersdorf was shortlisted for the Branford Boase Award and the Guardian Children's Book Award.

The Mountain of Immoderate Desires won the 1996 Southern Arts Literature prize.

== Publications ==
=== Adult novels ===
- Mourning is Not Permitted (1990)
- Malefice - A Novel (1992)
- The Mountain of Immoderate Desires (1994)

=== Books for young adults ===
- Last Train From Kummersdorf (2004)
- Saving Rafael (2009)
