= Barry Cunningham (publisher) =

British publisher (born 1952)

Barry Cunningham OBE (born 19 December 1952) is a British publisher, who worked for various publishers including Penguin Books and Bloomsbury before setting up Chicken House publishing in 2000. He is best known for signing J. K. Rowling and publishing Harry Potter and the Philosopher’s Stone in 1997.

== Early life and education ==
Cunningham was born on 19 December 1952 in London. He was educated at Malvern College before studying English Literature at Cambridge University.

== Career in publishing ==
Cunningham began working at Penguin in 1977 and held the position of marketing director in 1989. As marketing director for Puffin, Cunningham travelled around the UK with Roald Dahl. He later joined Bloomsbury, where he initiated Bloomsbury Children’s Books. While in this position he signed J. K. Rowling and published Harry Potter and the Philosopher’s Stone.

In 2000, Cunningham left Bloomsbury to start the Chicken House, a publisher of children’s fiction that specializes in new writers. Barry also published the books of New York Times bestselling author Cornelia Funke.

In 2010, Cunningham received an OBE in recognition of his contribution to children’s literature.

== Notable awards ==
- Awarded an OBE in 2010 for Services to the Publishing Industry.
- Winner of the Branford Boase Award in 2000 with Katherine Roberts (author of Song Quest)
- Winner of the Branford Boase Award in 2003 with Kevin Brooks (author of Martyn Pig)
- Nominated for the Branford Boase Award in 2008 with Sharon Dogar (author of Waves)
