= Aisha Bushby =

- Born: 1991 (age 34–35); Bahrain
- Education: University of Birmingham
- Years active: 2017–present

Aisha Bushby (born 1991) is a children's writer. Her work includes the middle-grade novels A Pocketful of Stars (2019), which was shortlisted for the Branford Boase Award among other accolades, and A Flash of Fireflies (2022), which won the inaugural Adrien Prize.

== Early life ==
Bushby was born in Bahrain to Kuwaiti-Canadian parents and moved to England as a child, where she lived in Birmingham, Lincolnshire and Cheltenham. She also had stints in Kuwait and Vancouver. Bushby graduated with a Bachelor of Arts (BA) in English literature and Philosophy from the University of Birmingham.

== Career ==
Bushby began her published writing career contributing a short story "Marionette Girl" to the 2017 anthology Change is Gonna Come. The anthology was named a Sunday Times Children's Book of the Week.

In 2018, Bushby signed a two book deal with Egmont, through which she published her debut middle-grade novel A Pocketful of Stars in 2019. A Pocketful of Stars was shortlisted for the Branford Boase Award and longlisted for the Carnegie Medal.

Bushby reunited with Egmont for the publication of her Moonchild trilogy, starting with Voyage of the Lost and Found in 2020. The second book City of the Sun was published in 2021.

In 2022, Bushby's middle-grade fantasy novel A Flash of Flies was published via Farshore (a HarperCollins imprint). A Flash of Fireflies won the 2023 inaugural Adrien Prize and placed third for Best Children's Book at the Diverse Book Awards.

Bushby moved to Usborne Books in 2023 for the publication of Tiny, the Secret Adventurer, the first in a children's illustrated book series, and Barrington Stoke for the publication of the witch-themed standalones Suitcase S(witch) and The Shop-Witch's Quest in 2023 and 2024. Tiny, the Secret Adventurer was longlisted for the Alligator's Mouth Award.

== Bibliography ==
=== Moonchild series ===
- Voyage of the Lost and Found (2020)
- City of the Sun (2021)

=== Tiny the Secret Adventurer series ===
- Tiny, the Secret Adventurer (2023)
- The Mystery Visitor (2024)
- Friends to the Rescue (2024)

=== Standalones ===
- A Pocketful of Stars (2019)
- A Flash of Fireflies (2022)
- Suitcase S(witch) (2023)
- The Shop-Witch's Quest (2024)

=== Short stories ===
- "Marionette Girl" in A Change is Gonna Come (2017)
- "Jedi's Attic" in The Book of Hopes (2020) edited by Katherine Rundell
- "The Dream Jar" in Faber Book of Bedtime Stories (2022)
- "Game Over" in Read, Scream, Repeat (2023), edited by Jennifer Killick

=== Reading practice ===
- The Mysterious Museum (2021)
- Magic at the Lake (2023)

== Accolades ==
Year	Award	Category	Title	Result	Ref.
2020	Carnegie Medal		A Pocketful of Stars	Longlisted	
2020	Branford Boase Award		A Pocketful of Stars	Shortlisted	
2023	Adrien Prize		A Flash of Fireflies	Won	
2023	Diverse Book Awards	Best Children's Book	A Flash of Fireflies	3rd	
