= Wendy Meddour =

British writer, illustrator and academic

- Born: 1975 (age 50–51)
- Education: University of Exeter
- Writing career
- Language: English
- Genres: Children's fiction and picture books
- Notable awards: The John C. Laurence Award

Wendy Meddour is a British writer, illustrator and academic. Her debut children's novel A Hen in the Wardrobe was published by Frances Lincoln Publishers in 2012. The book was shortlisted for the Branford Boase Award (for Outstanding First Novel) and was named one of the 'Best 50 Culturally Diverse Books since the 1950s' by The Guardian.

Meddour then published the bestselling Wendy Quill series with Oxford University Press, which has since been licensed in over ten countries. The series is based on her own childhood and was illustrated by her then twelve-year-old daughter, Mina May, making her one of the youngest professional illustrators in the world, with four published books to her name. Mina May has since made appearances on BBC Newsround and Woman's Hour.

Meddour also writes rhyming picture books; the latest titles include How the Library (Not the Prince) Saved Rapunzel (Frances Lincoln, 2014) and The Glump and the Peeble (Frances Lincoln, 2016).

== Life ==
Born in 1975, Meddour was brought up in the Welsh seaside town of Aberystwyth. She later left to study English Literature and acquired an MA and PhD in Critical and Cultural Theory which in turn led her to become an expert in Feminist Theory, Postcolonial Theory, Poststructuralism and the Nineteenth Century Novel. Meddour taught English Literature and Critical Theory at St Hilda's College, Oxford University for eight years, before becoming a children's writer and illustrator at the age of 35.

== A Hen in the Wardrobe ==
A Hen in the Wardrobe is about a young boy called Ramzi who tries to get to the bottom of his dad's sleepwalking habit. First Ramzi finds his dad climbing trees in the middle of the night, and then he goes into Ramzi's wardrobe looking for a hen. The trouble is, he's sleepwalking because he's homesick for his native Algeria. So Ramzi, Dad and Mum go back to Dad's Berber village in the desert region of North Africa, where Ramzi meets his Berber grandmother and cousins, and faces the scary Sheherazad. However, Ramzi cannot be sure if he has solved his dad's problem or what will happen when they get back home again.

The book won the John C. Laurence Award for writing that improves relations between races.

== Wendy Quill Series ==
The Wendy Quill series features the adventures and mishaps of the eponymous Wendy Quill and her friends.

== Works ==
- How the Library (Not the Prince) Saved Rapunzel (London: Frances Lincoln, October 2014)
- Dottie Blanket and the Hilltop (Cardiff: Firefly Press, October 2014)
- Series: Wendy Quill (Oxford: Oxford University Press)
  - Book I: Wendy Quill is a Crocodile's Bottom (May, 2013)
  - Book 2: Wendy Quill tries to Grow a Pet (March, 2014)
  - Book 3: Wendy Quill is Full up of Wrong (July, 2014)
- Series: Cinnamon Grove (London: Frances Lincoln)
  - Book I: A Hen in the Wardrobe (February, 2012)
  - Book II: The Black Cat Detectives (August, 2012)
