= Charlie Fletcher =

British screenwriter and author

- Born: 1960 (age 65–66); United Kingdom
- Occupations: Author, screenwriter

Charlie Fletcher (born 1960) is a British screenwriter and author. His works include the children's novel, Stoneheart.

== Biography ==
After studying English literature at university, Fletcher began his career in the film business and then progressed to the BBC where he worked in film editing.

He then went to California where he became a screenwriter, having been awarded a Warner Brothers Fellowship in Screenwriting at USC School of Cinema and TV. He wrote screenplays for TriStar, MGM, Paramount and Warner Bros. among others.

He also moved into other types of writing, including magazine features, a computer game and as a national Sunday newspaper columnist and a restaurant reviewer.

He met and married his wife, Domenica, a fellow Scot, in Los Angeles. They have two children and live in Edinburgh.

== Filmography ==
=== Cinema ===
- Fair Game (1995)
- Mean Machine (2001)

=== TV series ===
- Red Cap (2003)
- Steel River Blues (2004)
- Murder Investigation Team (2005)
- Taggart (2005)
- Afterlife (2005)
- Donovan (2006)
- Ultimate Force (2006)
- Wire in the Blood (2008)

== Novels ==
Fletcher's Stoneheart, was shortlisted for the Branford Boase Award in 2007. Stoneheart, along with Ironhand and Silvertongue make up the Stoneheart trilogy. In this trilogy there is a second reality to contemporary London, co-existing with "normal" reality, but seen by only a few people. This trilogy is about a boy who enters that second reality, and must survive in it.

Fletcher published a standalone novel, Far Rockaway, in September 2011. It is the story of a feisty young woman who is injured with her grandfather in an accident and who wakes up in a world constructed from all the classic swashbuckling adventure novels he read her as a child. She has to make her way to the castle at the end of this world in order to rescue him, knowing that only by so doing will she survive getting back in the real world. The story takes place both in this fantasy world and in the modern Manhattan ER in which doctors fight for both their lives as their family looks on.

The Oversight, the first in a series of adult novels, was published by Orbit Books in May 2014.

== Bibliography ==
- The Stoneheart Trilogy
  - Stoneheart (2006)
  - Ironhand (2007)
  - Silvertongue (2008)
- Far Rockaway (2011)
- The Oversight Trilogy
  - The Oversight (2014)
  - The Paradox (2015)
  - The Remnant (2017)
- A Boy and his Dog at the End of the World (2019) Writing as C. A. Fletcher
- Dead Water (2022) Writing as C. A. Fletcher
