= Stoneheart trilogy =

Children's book series by Charlie Fletcher

Stoneheart
- First UK edition of Stoneheart
- Author: Charlie Fletcher
- Language: English
- Genre: Children's
- Publisher: Hodder
- Publication date: 19 October 2006 (UK); 1 May 2007 (US)
- Publication place: United Kingdom
- Pages: 496 (UK); 464 (US)
- ISBN: 978-0-340-91162-4
- OCLC: 70401626
- Followed by: Ironhand

The Stoneheart trilogy is a set of three children's novels by Charlie Fletcher, published between 2006 and 2008. The three novels in the trilogy are Stoneheart, Ironhand, and Silvertongue.

The trilogy follows two children, George and Edie, as they struggle to survive a war between the animated statues of London. The war takes place in a second reality, which overlays modern London. Thus the children and statues can see and interact with the reality of the normal world, but the people in that reality are unaware of the second reality around them.

== Plots ==
=== Stoneheart ===
While on a school trip to the Natural History Museum, George breaks off the head of a stone dragon. This causes a stone pterodactyl to seemingly come alive, peeling itself off the top of the building and beginning to chase George. During the chase, George bumps into the Gunner, a statue of a World War I soldier who helps him escape the pterodactyl. He explains to George that by breaking the stone dragon, he has entered a different version of London where statues move and talk. There are many worlds and the world George has entered is one where all the statues and sculptures are Spits or Taints and are at war with each other. No one else can see what is happening to him, except Edie Laemmel, a glint. She has the power to experience past events recorded in stones by touching them. With the Gunner as a guide, George and Edie go to seek help from two Sphinx statues. After George solves a riddle, one of the Spinxes tells him to find The Black Friar. On the way to The Black Friar, George, Edie and the Gunner are attacked by a guardian Dragon statue. The Dragon cuts a mark into George's hand before the Gunner intervenes, allowing the children to escape. Once they reach The Black Friar, he identifies George as a maker, someone with a special gift for sculpting things from stone or metal. The Friar also tells them to find the 'Stone Heart' and put the broken dragon carving back to make amends for the damage George has done. But on the way the Gunner has sacrificed himself by breaking his promise sworn in the Maker's name to the Walker to try and save Edie, and ultimately falls into the clutches of the Walker. It is left to George to use his new-found gifts as a maker to rescue her. In so doing he sacrifices his own safety and is fated to take 'The Hard Way', remaining with her in this dangerous unLondon.

=== Ironhand ===
In Ironhand, the Gunner is imprisoned below the city in an old water tank. At the moment George and Edie set off to try and rescue him they are separated, as George is snatched into the air by a cat-faced gargoyle named Spout. Edie sets off on her own. George is seemingly rescued from Spout by Ariel, a spit who is also an Agent of Fate come to ensure he takes The Hard Way. She takes him to receive the challenge issued by a statue called The Last Knight. He has to fight three duels: on land, on water and in the air. He is rescued from certain death on the end of the Knight's lance by the timely arrival of Spout who snatches him into the sky. George mends Spout's broken wing, and the two form a bond. Although he has cheated death, the legacy of The Hard Way is inescapably carved into George's flesh, as three veins of marble, bronze and stone twine up his arm, each representing a duel to be fought. Each one will only stop moving fatally towards his heart as he fights and wins the duel it represents. Edie meanwhile has gone back to the Black Friar for help but, helped by a statue named Little Tragedy, tries to escape the pub when it appears the Walker has come to the door. Only when they arrive at their destination through the mirrors does it become apparent that Tragedy has betrayed her to the Walker. Edie is now trapped in a past London, the London of the Frost Fair where she once glinted herself being killed. Meanwhile, the Gunner has discovered that the Walker has killed many glints and stolen their sea-glass heart stone in his search for power. He escapes the water tank by crawling through London's underground rivers, taking the stones with him. He expects to die at midnight but survives because George stands watch on his plinth thereby taking his place.

While he does this, George experiences what all soldier statues experience every night: an hour in the trenches under bombardment during an artillery duel in World War One. While he does this, he meets a soldier with his own dead father's face and, though the soldier dies, George is able to heal his guilt at his father's death and realise he was both loved and known to love him back. When George wakes up, one of the veins of metal has disappeared from his arm. The Gunner and George are reunited, along with the Queen (Boadicea) and her daughters who have taken an interest in saving Edie. They travel through mirrors into the past to try and rescue her. Edie escapes briefly from the Walker but is recaptured, after she has buried her sea-glass heart stone to save it. He takes her to the Frost Fair, where, despite having foreseen it, Edie is unable to prevent her own death beneath the ice. George fights the Walker on the ice (his second duel) while the Gunner retrieves Edie's body. The Queen takes them all through the mirrors in her chariot but only after trying to run down the Walker, who escapes into the Outer Darkness beyond the Black Mirrors. Unseen by any of the others, an Ice Devil enters our world as the Walker exits it and follows them back to the present. Edie is revived by the power of all the stolen heart stones the Gunner saved from under the city, and she finds, among them, her mother's stone. Since there is a glimmer of fire remaining in the stone, Edie begins to believe her mother may still be alive. George has one more duel to fight before the last stone vein twines into his heart and kills him. The arrival of the Ice Devil has frozen time and the city, which is disappearing under a heavy snow fall. The ordinary people seem to have disappeared, leaving George and Edie the only normal humans in a city now only populated by warring statues.

== Characters ==
George Chapman – the protagonist, whose adventures the story follows. Branded a 'maker' during a battle with the Temple Bar Dragon.

Edie Laemmel – one of the thought to be extinct 'glints', met early on in the book, who reluctantly befriends George.

The Walker – The antagonist of the book. Cursed and now a servant of the stone, he is unable to keep still. It is strongly implied in the book that he is actually the Elizabethan occultist John Dee.

=== Spits ===
The statues that are models of humans have the spirit of that particular person inside of them, enabling them to talk. Being the 'spitting image' of that person, they are called 'Spits'. Spits are the good guys against the evil villain taints.

The Gunner – the first 'Spit' George meets in the book. The Gunner is part of the Royal Artillery Memorial which was made by Charles Sargeant Jagger and stands in Hyde Park Corner.

The Officer One of the Spits who is part of the Royal Artillery Memorial and whom George meets as he stands on the plinth of the Gunner.

The Sphinxes – Met near Cleopatra's Needle. Being half lion and half woman, there is some confusion as to whether they are Spits or Taints.

Dictionary Johnson – the statue of the first man to write down all English words and their definition, Samuel Johnson. Like Johnson himself, the statue is prone to muscle spasms and fidgeting behaviour. The statue, made by Percy Hetherington Fitzgerald is in Westminster at Aldwych & Strand behind St Clement Danes Church.

The Black Friar – enigmatic Spit whose true allegiances are unknown. The statue stands above Black Friar's Pub in Blackfriars, London.

Fusilier – The 5th Spit George Chapman meets. The Fusilier saves George from the Gridman. The Royal London Fusiliers Monument, made by Albert Toft, is on High Holborn, near Chancery Lane tube station and the regimental chapel is at St Sepulchre-without-Newgate. (Image of Royal Fusilier memorial.)

The Queen – first met in 'Ironhand' when she decides Edie needs help. Her statue consists of her, a battle chariot and her 2 daughters.

The Old Soldier – first met in 'Silvertongue' he is accompanied by the Young Soldier.

=== Taints ===
The animal and other creature statues (such as the pterodactyl and the salamanders) have no spirit inside them so cannot talk. They are called 'taints'.

The Grid Man – a metal sculpture separated into a grid, he moves part by part, just out of sync. Although a humanoid shape, it is classified as a taint. The Grid Man statue is located in High Holborn at the Chancery Lane junction

Minotaur – captures Edie but is killed by the plasticine bullet that George makes.

Spout – named by George, lives near St Pancras railway station and originally an enemy though after (in the next book) George uses his 'maker' skills to heal its wing, befriends him and fights by his side.

Temple Bar Dragon – the most detailed of all dragon sculptures. As with Spout, the dragon is against George, having a big battle with him and scarring his hand, but in the last book of the series, the Temple Bar Dragon turns over sides because of his purpose. The purpose of its construction being to defend the city, it ended up being a major part in the battle.

The Pterodactyl – the first taint that unpeeled itself from a frieze at the Natural History Museum and chased George. It was killed by The Gunner as with the salamanders.

Salamanders – three lizard-like statues that are killed by The Gunner at the War Memorial.

=== Supporting roles ===
Mr Killingbeck – George's teacher at the start of the book.

Kay – George's 'babysitter'. Lives in the flat below.

The Clocker – Another of the 'Weirded' or cursed men, unlike the Walker it is his punishment, not his choice to serve the Stone. It is his curse to watch time.

== Stoneheart reception ==
Stoneheart was shortlisted for the Branford Boase Award and longlisted for the Guardian Children's Fiction Prize. It has also been nominated for the Carnegie Medal.

Responses to Stoneheart were mixed. Several critics praised the central concept, calling it an "intriguing premise" and an "ingenious idea". The Scotsman said the book was "thrilling stuff", and The Times was highly positive, describing it as "intelligently and elegantly written, with pace and suspense, varied and convincing dialogue, and big themes of loyalty, sacrifice and emotional growth." However some reviewers felt that it was "tedious and longer than necessary" and that "the execution is flat". In particular, Kirkus Reviews criticised the action for being "disappointingly dry", and Publishers Weekly said it had a "protagonist who doesn't ring true."

== Film adaptation ==
The film rights to Stoneheart were purchased by Paramount months before the book was even released with Scott Rudin and Lorenzo di Bonaventura producing the film adaptation. On March 24, 2009, Disney was in talks for the film adaptation with Robert Zemeckis set to produce the film through ImageMovers.

== References in other media ==
- The second book in the series ("Ironhand") can be seen in the television show The Middle. The character Brick Heck can be seen reading it in the episode 'Friends, Lies and Videotape' and is amongst his pile of books in the next episode, 'Hecks on a Plane'.
