= Steve Augarde =

British author and artist

- Born: Steven Andre Augarde; 3 October 1950; Birmingham, England
- Occupations: Artist; writer; musician
- Writing career
- Genre: Children's literature
- Notable work: The Various

Steve Augarde (born 3 October 1950) is a British author and artist. He has written and illustrated several novels for children and young adults as well as over seventy picture books for younger children, including pop-up books for which he designed the paper engineering. He also designed and illustrated the Little Red Car books by Matthew Price, among others.

== Biography ==
Steven Andre Augarde was born in 1950 in Birmingham and spent many years in the West Country before moving to Yorkshire. He attended Yeovil School of Art, Somerset College of Art, and Rolle Teacher Training College. As well as producing his own books, he has worked as an illustrator and paper engineer for other authors and artists. He also provided the artwork and music for two series of the animated BBC television show Bump about a clumsy young elephant. He is a semi-pro jazz musician, playing double bass for the Gents, a four-piece jazz group.

Augarde's more recent work has been aimed at older children and young adults. The Touchstone Trilogy is a subtle fantasy which depicts fairy folk as reclusive tribes largely without magic. X Isle is a post-apocalyptic dystopian thriller. Leonardo da Vinci combines fiction and non-fiction, revealing the life and art of Leonardo da Vinci partly through the journal of a young apprentice.

The Various won a Smarties award in 2003 and was shortlisted for the Branford Boase Award. All three books of the Touchstone Trilogy and X Isle have been nominated for the Carnegie Medal.

== Selected bibliography ==
=== Touchstone Trilogy ===
- The Various (2005)
- Celandine (2006)
- Winter Wood (2008)

== Others ==
- X Isle (2009)
- Lifelines: Leonardo da Vinci (2009)

== Picture books ==
- Pig (1975)
- Barnaby Shrew, Black Dan and the Mighty Wedgwood (1979)
- Bump's Umbrella (1992)
- Tractor Trouble (1997)
- Fire Engine to the Rescue (1998)
- When I Grow Up... (2000)
- Vroom, Vroom! (2002)
- Kissing Fish (2002)
