= Stolen (Christopher novel) =

2009 novel by Lucy Christopher

- Cover of Stolen
- Author: Lucy Christopher
- Language: English
- Genre: Young adult fiction
- Published: 2009 The Chicken House
- Publication place: United Kingdom
- Media type: Print
- Pages: 304
- Awards: Branford Boase Award (2010); Southern Schools Book Award (2010)
- ISBN: 9781906427139
- Followed by: Flyaway

Stolen is the debut novel of author Lucy Christopher. It was published in the UK in 2009 and is the story of Gemma Toombs, a 16-year-old girl who is kidnapped by a 27-year-old man named Ty and taken to the middle of the Great Sandy Desert in the Australian Outback. Subtitled A Letter to My Captor, the book is told in second person narrative as a letter from Gemma to Ty.

== Plot ==
Whilst at a Bangkok airport, 16-year-old Gemma is kidnapped by 27-year-old Tyler “Ty” MacFarlane from a coffee shop after he drugs her coffee. He smuggles her away on a plane to Australia and takes her to the middle of the desert, expecting her to fall in love with him. Gemma disapproves of Ty, but after an incident she develops a soft corner for him. Ty has a nightmare about his past and shouts and screams until Gemma gets up and consoles him. Still Gemma has not entirely forgiven Ty and tries to escape by taking his vehicle but does not succeed as the truck gets stuck in the desert. Ty rescues her and takes care of her until her burns have healed. Now Gemma has started to think of Ty in a good way and Ty is happy with that. Ty wants her to realize the importance and beauty of nature which was the main reason he built this house in the middle of the desert. For this purpose he paints his entire outhouse and himself with colors that resemble nature. And this does it. That day Ty and Gemma fall asleep outside the house, on the sand itself. Gemma has now started falling for Ty. The next day Ty leaves to collect snakes as their venom is essential for the anti-venom that he is preparing. He leaves a note for Gemma about his whereabouts and Gemma goes in search of Ty behind the house near the water reserve and there a snake bites her. Ty takes Gemma to the mine site/civilization for her treatment after the anti-venom that he had preserved is out of date. Gemma asked Ty to stay with her in the hospital. He is arrested and whilst receiving treatment for her ordeal she is told that any feelings she had for Ty were due to the Stockholm syndrome.

== Characters ==
- Gemma Toombs - the 16-year-old protagonist of the novel. Originally from England, she and her parents, with whom she has a strained relationship, are on a trip to Vietnam when she is kidnapped by a young man who takes her to one of the most isolated parts of the Outback in Australia.
- Tyler "Ty" MacFarlane - the 27-year-old man who abducts Gemma. Prior to kidnapping her, Ty had been stalking Gemma for years, and decided that the only way to have her would be to drug her and take her to the middle of the Great Sandy Desert in Australia. There, he expects her to not only fall in love with him, but stay with him forever.

== Publishing history ==
Stolen was first published in the UK in 2009 by Chicken House. The first American edition was published by Scholastic in 2010. The book has been subsequently translated into French (as Lettre à mon ravisseur, Gallimard, 2010), Dutch (as Brief aan mijn ontvoerder, The House of Books, 2010), Greek (as Apagōgē, Ekdoseis Psychogios, 2010), Danish (as Stjålet: Et brev til min bortfører, Carlsen, 2011), and German (as Ich wünschte, ich könnte dich hassen, Carlsen, 2011)

== Awards ==
Awards for Stolen
Year	Award	Result	Ref.
2010	Branford Boase Award	Won	
2010	Prime Minister's Literary Awards	Shortlisted	
2010	Southern Schools Book Award	Won	
2011	Michael L. Printz Award	Honored	
2010	Gold Inky Award	Won	
	Hull Children's Book Award		
