= Liz Hyder =

English author

- Born: 1976 or 1977 (age 48–49); London, England
- Education: University of Bristol
- Occupation: Author

Liz Hyder (born 1976 or 1977) is an English author.

== Life and career ==
Hyder was born in London. She attended the University of Bristol where she studied drama. She has previously worked as a publicist for the BBC and was a freelance PR consultant.

Her debut novel, Bearmouth, was published by Pushkin Children’s Books in 2019 and aimed towards young adults. It is about a child called Newt who lives and works in a Victorian coalmine. It won the 2020 Branford Boase Award and the Waterstones Children's Book Prize for older readers. She published her second novel, The Gifts, in 2022 which is aimed towards adults. It is centered around four women and set in the Victorian era. In her 2024 young adult novel The Twelve, the search for a missing sister takes two young people into a dangerous world of Welsh folklore and magic. It won the 2025 English-language Tir na n-Og Award.
