= Christine Pillainayagam =

English writer

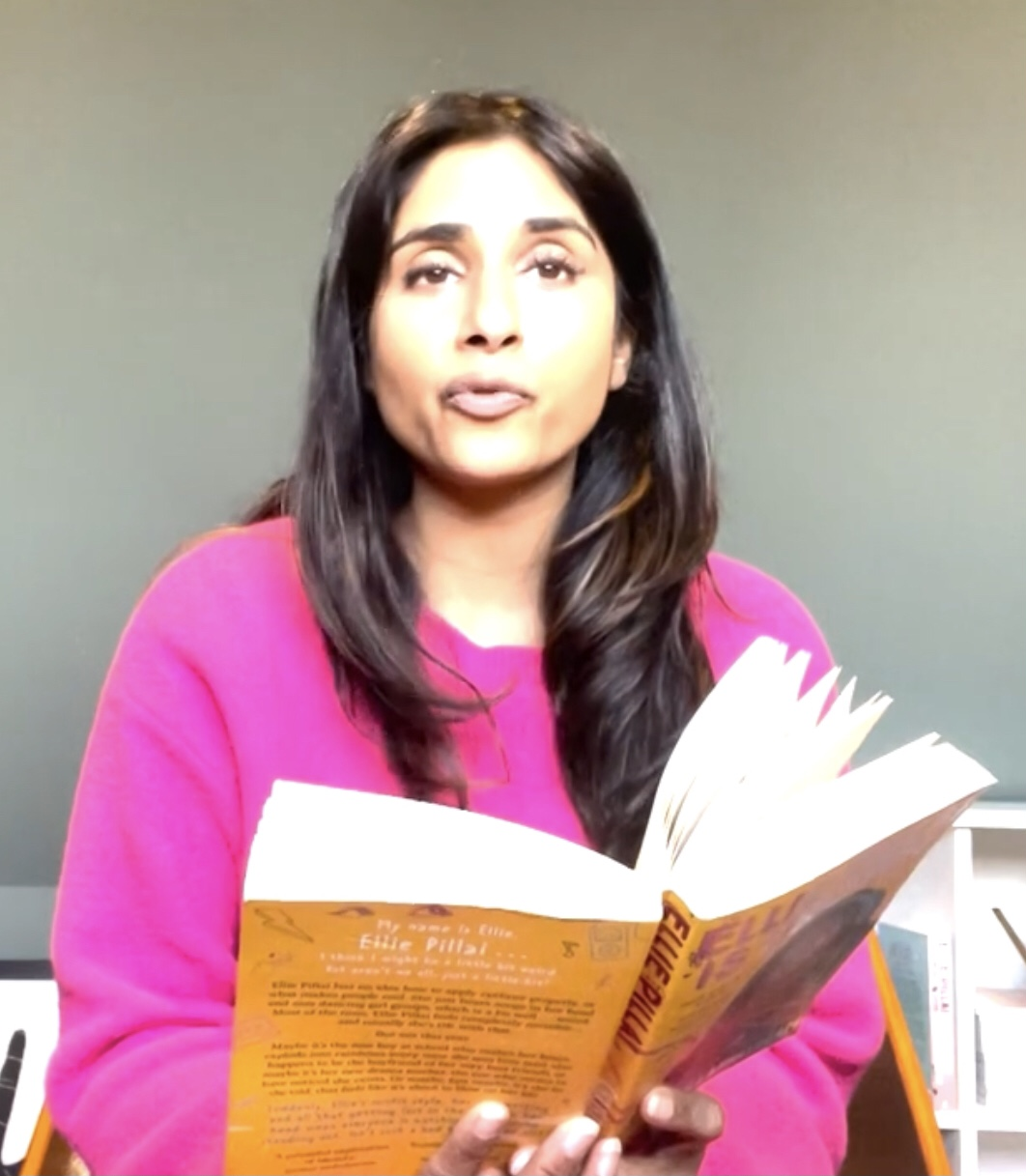
- Pillainayagam in 2023
- Born: Christine Marina Pillainayagam; 1981 (age 44–45); Norwich, England
- Years active: 2018–present
- Children: 2

Christine Marina Pillainayagam (born 1981) is an English writer. Her debut young adult (YA) novel Ellie Pillai Is Brown (2022), the first in a trilogy, won the Branford Boase Award.

== Early life ==
Pillainayagam was born in Norwich to Sri Lankan Tamil parents and grew up in Sheringham.

== Career ==
From 2018 to 2022, Pillainayagam wrote a lifestyle blog titled The Little Brown Book.

In 2021, Pillainayagam signed her first two-book deal for a coming-of-age series with Faber & Faber. The first of these titled Ellie Pillai Is Brown was published in 2022, marking Pillainayagam's debut. The novel follows the titular 15-year-old character, inspired by the author's own love of music and secondary school experiences. Ellie Pillai Is Brown won the 2023 Branford Boase Award and was shortlisted for the Waterstones Children's Book Prize and the Jhalak Prize in the Children's and Young Adult category. It also featured on the Reading Agency's Big Eurovision Read list. The second novel in the series Ellie Pillai Is (Almost) in Love was published in 2023, followed by the third and final installment Ellie Pillai Is Not Done Yet in 2024.

== Personal life ==
Pillainayagam has lived in North London and Faversham, Kent. She has two children.

== Bibliography ==
=== Ellie Pillai trilogy ===
- Ellie Pillai Is Brown (2022)
- Ellie Pillai Is (Almost) in Love (2023)
- Ellie Pillai Is Not Done Yet (2024)

=== Adult novels ===
- Chaotic Female Lead (2027)

== Accolades ==
Year	Award	Category	Title	Result	Ref
2023	Waterstones Children's Book Prize	Older Fiction	Ellie Pillai Is Brown	Shortlisted	
2023	Jhalak Prize	Children's and Young Adult	Ellie Pillai Is Brown	Shortlisted	
2023	Branford Boase Award		Ellie Pillai Is Brown	Won	
