= Beetle Boy =

2016 middle grade novel by M. G. Leonard

- First edition (UK)
- Author: M. G. Leonard
- Language: English
- Series: Beetle Trilogy
- Genre: Children's books
- Publisher: Scholastic, The Chicken House
- Publication place: US, UK
- English publication date: 23 February 2016
- Media type: Print (hardback)
- Pages: 322
- ISBN: 978-0-545-85346-0
- OCLC: 941878189

Beetle Boy is a 2016 middle grade novel written by M. G. Leonard, illustrated by Júlia Sardà, and published by The Chicken House (United Kingdom) and Scholastic (United States).

It is the first part of a trilogy, as volume 1 of the Beetle Trilogy series. Beetle Queen, the second part of the trilogy, was published in April 2017 in the UK and the third part Battle of the Beetles is published in February 2018. Beetle Boy won the Branford Boase Award in 2017, for outstanding first novel for children.

== Plot and characters ==
Kirkus Reviews summarizes the plot as "a young teen searches for his father with the assistance of unusual beetles." The book stars Darkus Cuttle, who moves in with his uncle after his father mysteriously went missing. Lucretia Cutter, the antagonist responsible for Darkus' father's disappearance, tries to kill the intelligent beetles that Darkus befriend.

== Reception ==
The Guardian in a review of Beetle Boy wrote "Why it has taken them [beetles] this long to get starring roles in a children's book is a mystery, although their appeal to younger readers is not." and concluded "The discovery that a seemingly powerless band of creatures so small and seemingly powerless can be possessed of such skill, beauty and strength should keep this gem on many a bedroom and library shelf for years to come." School Library Journal called it "An engaging story" and concluded " Educators looking for fiction that connects to and supports science curricula may find a new favorite in this." Booktrust found it "a wonderfully funny and engaging book, which is full of action, adventure and delightful illustrations." and "Perfect for fans of Roald Dahl."

Beetle Boy has also been reviewed by Booklist, The Horn Book Guide, School Library Connection, Kirkus Reviews, Publishers Weekly, and AudioFile.

Beetle Boy has been licensed to over thirty-seven international territories, becoming a best-seller in the UK and the Netherlands. It has been nominated for a number of UK literary awards including the 2017 CILIP Carnegie Medal and the UKLA award. Julia Eccleshare chose it as one of the Best Children's Books of 2016 in The Guardian and The Telegraph included it in "The 50 Best Books for Christmas 2016" and in its "Best Children's Books of 2016".

In America, Publishers Weekly selected Beetle Boy as one of the Best Twenty Middle Grade Books of 2016 and the New York Public Library chose it as one of the Best Books for Kids 2016.
