= Bridget Collins =

British author of adult and young adult fiction

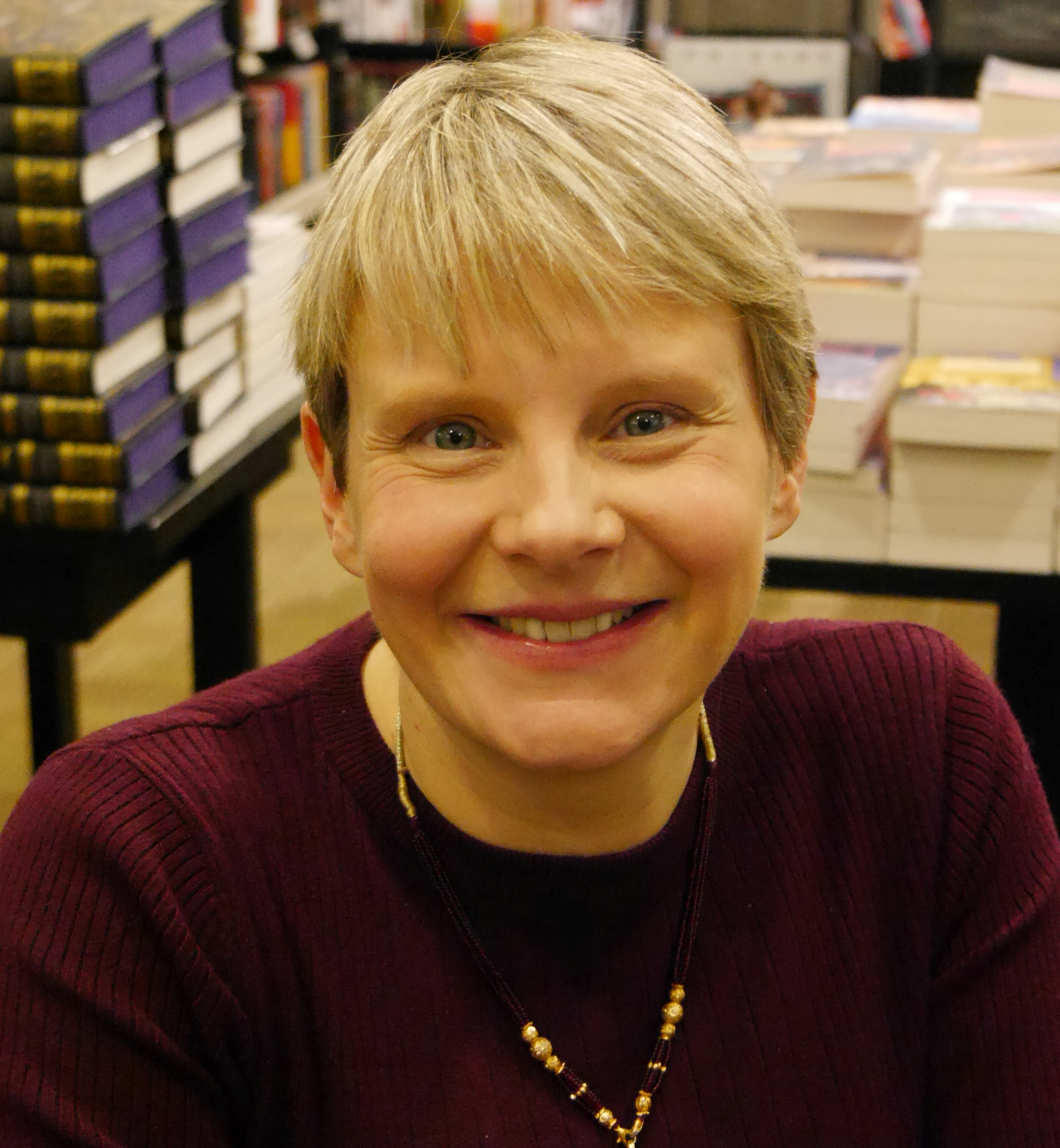
- Collins in 2019
- Born: 1981 (age 44–45); Kent, England
- Education: King's College, Cambridge, London Academy of Music and Dramatic Art
- Occupation: Author
- Years active: 2008-present
- Notable work: The Traitor Game, The Binding, The Betrayals

Bridget Rose Collins (born 1981) is a British author of adult and young adult fiction.

Collins was born in 1981 in Kent, England. She earned a degree in English at King's College, Cambridge, then trained as an actor at the London Academy of Music and Dramatic Art, and started her first novel when she was not working.

She has written seven young adult titles as B. R. Collins. Her first, The Traitor Game, won the 2009 Branford Boase Award.

Her first adult novel was published in 2019, and was shortlisted for Waterstones Book of the Year.

== Publications ==
=== Young adult titles ===
- The Traitor Game (2008)
- A Trick of the Dark (2009)
- Tyme’s End (2011)
- Gamerunner (2011)
- Mazecheat (2012)
- The Broken Road (2012)
- Love in Revolution (2013)

=== Adult fiction ===
- The Binding (2019)
- The Betrayals (2020)
- The Silence Factory (2024)
- The Naked Light (2025)
