= The Oxford Companion to Children's Literature =

Reference work about children's literature

- Author: Humphrey Carpenter, Mari Prichard
- Language: English
- Publication date: 1984

The Oxford Companion to Children's Literature is a reference work first published in 1984, with its most recent edition in 2015. The Oxford Companions is a book series providing general knowledge within a specific area, in this case, children's literature.

The first edition of Companion, by the husband-and-wife team of Humphrey Carpenter and Mari Prichard, was published by Oxford University Press in 1984. Iona and Peter Opie originally intended to write the Companion but did not complete it. Although they consulted with others, Carpenter and Prichard wrote each entry themselves. In about 2,000 entries, it covers children's books and folklore from the Commonwealth, United States, and some other countries.

Daniel Hahn's updated edition of the Companion was published in 2015. Its longest entry is on Harry Potter.
