= David Fickling =

English children's book editor and publisher

David Fickling is an English children's book editor and publisher based in Oxford. Fickling runs David Fickling Books, which became an independent publishing house in July 2013. He has published books by authors including Philip Pullman, Mark Haddon, John Boyne and Linda Newbery. He began his career at the Oxford University Press, and later worked at Transworld and Scholastic, before setting up David Fickling Books in 2000, first as an imprint with Scholastic then under Random House. It has since become an independent publishing house, working in partnership with larger publishers.

In 2004, Fickling won the British Book Awards Editor of the Year.
