= Linda Buckley-Archer =

British writer

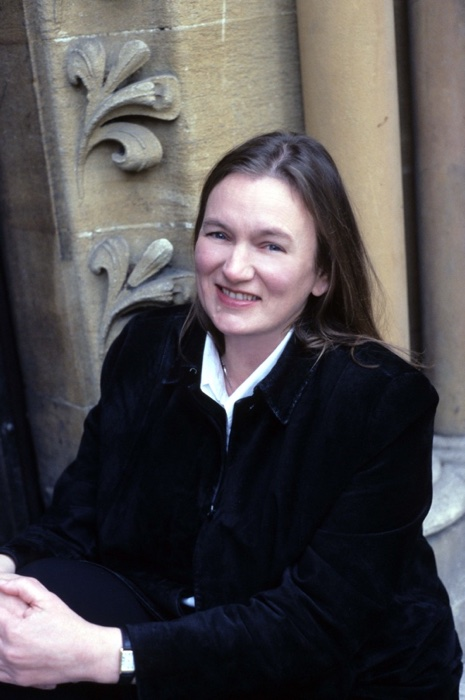
British author Linda Buckley-Archer

Linda Buckley-Archer is a London-based author and scriptwriter. She has written a number of plays and novels, including The Gideon Trilogy.

== Biography ==
Buckley-Archer was born in Sussex, but spent most of her childhood on a blackcurrant farm in Staffordshire. She now lives in London.

She has an MA in French literature and a PhD in Creative Writing from Goldsmiths, University of London, where she is also an Associate Lecturer. Buckley-Archer is a Royal Literary Fund fellow. Originally trained as a linguist, she lectured in French for some years before becoming a full-time author and scriptwriter. She has written original drama for both BBC Radio (most recently, Pearls in the Tate) and television (One Night in White Satin).

Her science fiction novel series The Gideon Trilogy, written for children and teenagers, has been translated into ten languages and has garnered two Carnegie nominations, a Branford Boase Highly Commended Distinction, and was shortlisted for several state awards in the US. It was published in the UK and US by Simon & Schuster. It was inspired by the criminal underworld of eighteenth-century London. Buckley-Archer's most recent novel The Many Lives of John Stone was written for teens and upwards and was published by Simon & Schuster in the US in 2015.

Buckley-Archer is a regular reviewer for The Guardian, and has been a judge for the Branford Boase and Guardian Children’s Fiction Prizes.

== Bibliography ==
- The Many Lives of John Stone (2015)
- The Gideon trilogy:
  - Gideon the Cutpurse (US title: The Time Travelers) (2006)
  - The Tar Man (US title: The Time Thief) (2007)
  - Time Quake (US title: The Time Quake) (2008)
