= Tabitha Suzuma =

British writer

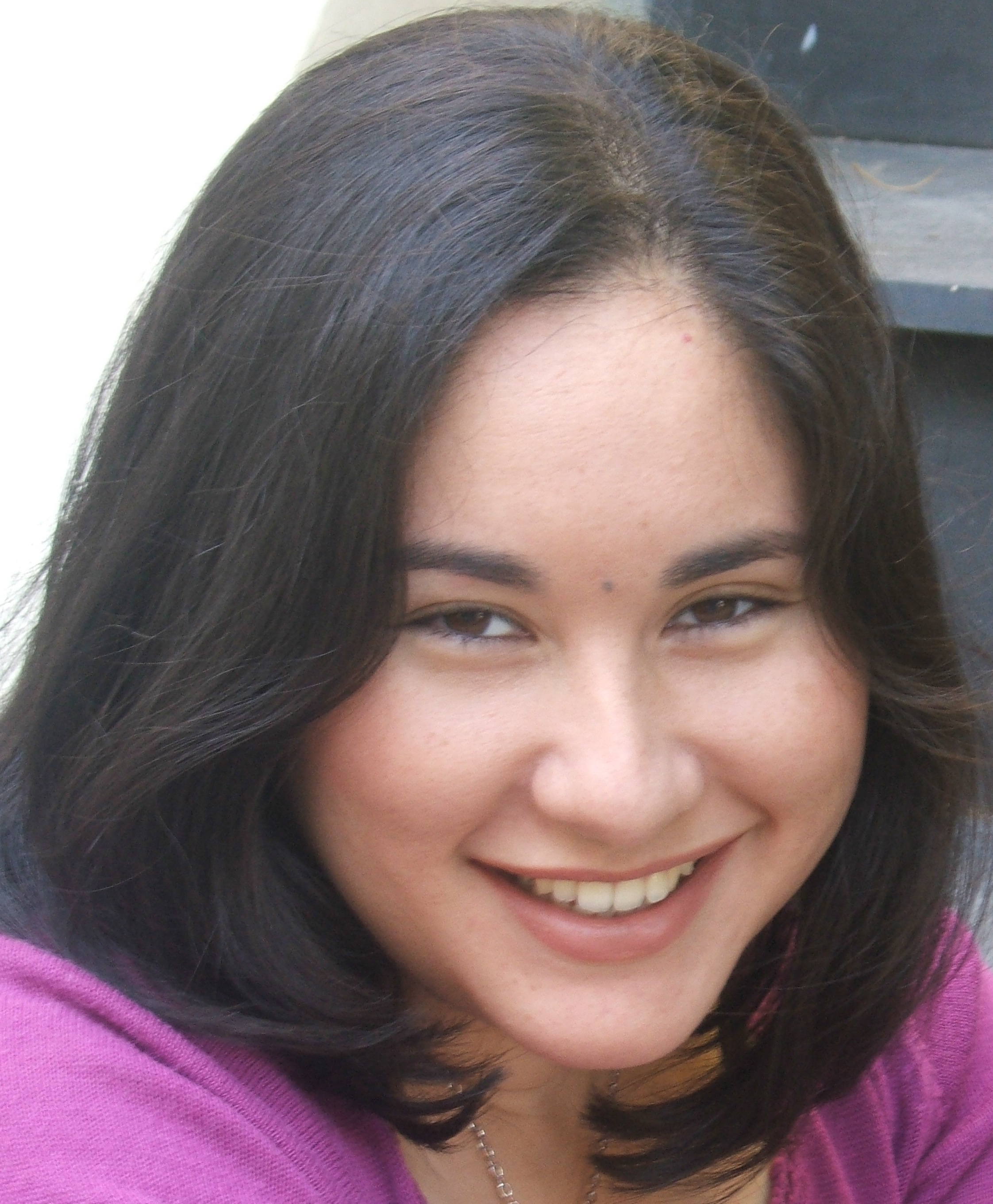
- Suzuma in 2010
- Born: Tabitha Sayo Victoria Anne Suzuma; February 2, 1975 (age 51); London, England
- Education: King's College London
- Occupation: Writer
- Writing career
- Period: 2006–present
- Genres: Fiction, Young adult fiction, Children's literature
- Website: www.tabithasuzuma.com

Tabitha Sayo Victoria Anne Suzuma is a British writer. She was born in 1975 and lives in London. She used to work as a primary school teacher and now divides her time between writing and tutoring. She is known for her novel Forbidden which is based on a taboo relationship between brother and sister.

== Biography ==
Tabitha Suzuma was born in West London in 1975 to an English mother and a Japanese father, the eldest of five children. She went to the French Lycée until age fourteen. She graduated from King's College London with a degree in French literature.

Years later, Suzuma became a teacher and wrote her first novel, A Note of Madness. She has since written five more novels for young adults. Her fifth novel, Forbidden, is an incestuous love story between a brother and sister. Her most recent novel was published in 2013.

== Bibliography ==
FORBIDDEN by Tabitha Suzuma

=== Young Adult novels ===
- A Note of Madness (Random House, 2006)
- From Where I Stand (Random House, 2007)
- A Voice in the Distance (Random House, 2008)
- Without Looking Back (Random House, 2009)
- Forbidden (Random House, 2010)
- Hurt (Random House, 2013)

== Awards ==
- 2007 A Note of Madness shortlisted for the Branford Boase Award
- 2008 From Where I Stand winner of the Young Minds Book Award
- 2008 From Where I Stand winner of the Stockport Schools Book Award
- 2008 From Where I Stand shortlisted for the North Lanarkshire Catalyst Book Award
- 2008 From Where I Stand nominated for the Waterstones Children's Book Prize
- 2008 From Where I Stand nominated for the Carnegie Medal
- 2008 Without Looking Back nominated for the Waterstones Children's Book Prize
- 2009 A Voice in the Distance nominated for the UKLA Children's Book Award
- 2008 A Voice in the Distance shortlisted for the Lancashire Children's Book of the Year
- 2009 Without Looking Back shortlisted for the Young Minds Book Award
- 2010 Without Looking Back shortlisted for the Stockport Schools Book Award
- 2011 Forbidden nominated for the Carnegie Medal
- 2011 Proibito/Forbidden winner of the Premio Speciale Cariparma for European Literature 2011
- 2015 Hurt nominated for the Carnegie Medal
