= Mara Bergman =

American writer

Mara Bergman is an American children's author, poet and editor. Born in Bronx, New York, on leap year day, she grew up in Wantagh, Long Island, and attended Wantagh High School and the University of the State of New York at Oneonta, spending her third year studying at Goldsmiths College, London. Mara moved to England in 1983, and soon began to work for the children’s publisher Walker Books. When her three children, Marissa, Eva and Jonathan, were young she decided to start writing picture books, and her awards include the BookTrust Early Years Award and the Stockport Prize. In 2014, Mara won the Mslexia Poetry Pamphlet Prize and her collection The Tailor's Three Sons and Other New York Poems was published by Seren in 2015. Her first full collection, The Disappearing Room, was published in 2018 by Arc Publications. Her children's books have been translated into Finnish, French, German, Japanese, Korean and Hebrew.

== Books ==
- Bears, Bears Everywhere, illustrated by Helen Craig Orchard Books, 1997
- Musical Beds, illustrated by Marjolein Pottie Simon & Schuster, 2002
- Glitter Kitty, illustrated by Lydia Monks Simon & Schuster, 2005
- Snip Snap!, illustrated by Nick Maland Hodder Children's Books, 2005
- Nick Mack’s Good Luck, illustrated by Jill Barton Walker Books, 2005
- Sylvie's Seahorse, illustrated by Tor Freeman Walker Books, 2006
- Oliver Who Would Not Sleep, illustrated by Nick Maland Hodder Children's Books, 2007
- Happy, illustrated by Simona Sanfilippo Evans Brothers, 2008
- Oliver Who Was Small But Mighty, illustrated by Nick Maland Hodder Children's Books, 2008
- Yum, Yum, illustrated by Nick Maland Hodder Children's Books, 2009
- Oliver Who Travelled Far and Wide, illustrated by Nick Maland Hodder Children's Books, 2009
- Lively Elizabeth, illustrated by Cassia Thomas Hodder Children's Books, 2010
- Oliver and the Noisy Baby, illustrated by Nick Maland Hodder Children's Books, 2011
- Itchy Itch Itch, illustrated by Emily Bolam Bloomsbury Children's Books, 2012
- Best Friends, illustrated by Nicola Slater Hodder Children's Books, 2014
- The Tailor's Three Sons and Other New York Poems, Seren, 2015
- Crossing Into Tamil Nadu, Templar, 2015
- The Disappearing Room, 2018
- The Tall Man and the Small Mouse, illustrated by Birgitta Sif, Walker Books, 2018
- The Night We Were Dylan Thomas

== Awards ==
- Writers Bursary from South East Arts UK, 1995-96
- Parent's Choice Award, 2005
- Stockport Children's Book Award, 2006
- BookTrust Early Years Award, 2009
- Myslexia Poetry Pamphlet Competition, 2014
- Templar Quarterly Poetry Prize, 2016
