= Sam Sedgman =

English writer and ferroequinologist

- Born: Samuel James Sedgman; 30 October 1987 (age 38)
- Education: University of Warwick; RADA; King's College London
- Years active: 2011–present
- Website: samsedgman.com

Samuel James Sedgman (born 30 October 1987) is an English writer and ferroequinologist. He began his career in theatre before gaining prominence as a children's author. His work has received a number of accolades, including a British Book Award and a Children's Book Award.

== Early life and education ==
Sedgman is from Berkshire. His father is an architect in the Reading area. Sedgman attended Wellington College, where he was a member of Ironduke and took part in theatre. He went to the 2005 Edinburgh Fringe Festival with his school. Sedgman graduated with a Bachelor of Arts (BA) in English and Creative Writing from the University of Warwick in 2009. He went on to complete a Master of Arts (MA) in Text and Performance at the Royal Academy of Dramatic Art (RADA) and also studied at King's College London.

== Career ==
Sedgman began his career theatre. He wrote the fringe dark comedy play Black and White and Red and worked for the National Theatre (NT) as a digital consultant and producer. He also hosted the NT's podcast.

Due to Sedgman's knowledge of and enthusiasm for railways, his friend M. G. Leonard invited him to collaborate on a railway-themed children's book series. Via a six-way auction in summer 2018, Macmillan Children's Books acquired the rights to publish the series titled Adventures on Trains, starting with The Highland Falcon Thief in January 2020. It was named Children's Book of the Week by Alex O'Connell of The Times. The Highland Falcon Thief won the British Book Award for Children's Fiction Book of the Year and the Children's Book Award for Younger Readers, in addition to a Books Are My Bag Readers' Award in the Children's Fiction category. Further books in the series included Kidnap on the California Comet and Murder on the Safari Star, which were both shortlisted for Best Juvenile at the Edgar Awards. The series was rounded out by Sabotage on the Solar Express and The Arctic Railway Assassin in 2022.

Sedgman published his debut non-fiction book Epic Adventures: Explore the World in 12 Amazing Train Journeys in 2022. Sam Brewster provided the book's illustrations. This was followed by Epic Cities: Take a Tour of 24 Cities in 2025.

As announced in 2022, Bloomsbury Children's acquired the rights to publish Sedgman's solo fiction debut The Clockwork Conspiracy in 2024, the first installment in a middle-grade thriller series. Sedgman first came up with the concept in 2016, inspired by the grandfather clock in his childhood home and a trip he took with his father to see Big Ben. The Clockwork Conspiracy was shortlisted for an Indie Book Award and a Books Are My Bag Readers' Award, both in the Children's Fiction category, as well as the Children's Book Award for Older Readers and the KS2 Award at the James Reckitt Hull Children's Book Awards.

== Adaptation ==
In December 2023, Kindle Entertainment optioned the rights to adapt Adventures on Trains for film.

== Bibliography ==
=== Adventures on Trains (with M. G. Leonard) ===
- The Highland Falcon Thief (2020)
- Kidnap on the California Comet (2020)
- Murder on the Safari Star (2021)
- Danger at Dead Man's Pass (2021)
- Sabotage on the Solar Express (2022)
- The Arctic Railway Assassin (2022)

=== Isaac Turner Investigates ===
- The Clockwork Conspiracy (2024)
- The Forbidden Atlas (2025)
- The Galileo Heist (2026)

=== Non-fiction ===
- Epic Adventures: Explore the World in 12 Amazing Train Journeys (2022)
- Epic Cities: Take a Tour of 24 Cities (2025)

=== Plays ===
- Black and White and Red (2011)

== Accolades ==
Year	Award	Category	Title	Result	Ref.
2020	Books Are My Bag Readers' Awards	Children's Fiction	The Highland Falcon Thief (Note: Shared with M. G. Leonard)	Won	
2021	British Book Awards	Children's Fiction Book of the Year	The Highland Falcon Thief	Won	
2022	Children's Book Award	Younger Readers	The Highland Falcon Thief	Won	
2022	Edgar Awards	Best Juvenile	Kidnap on the California Comet (Note: Shared with M. G. Leonard)	Shortlisted	
2023	Edgar Awards	Best Juvenile	Murder on the Safari Star (Note: Shared with M. G. Leonard)	Shortlisted	
2024	Indie Book Awards	Children's Fiction	The Clockwork Conspiracy	Shortlisted	
2024	Books Are My Bag Readers' Awards	Children's Fiction	The Clockwork Conspiracy	Shortlisted	
2025	James Reckitt Hull Children's Book Awards	KS2 Award	The Clockwork Conspiracy	Shortlisted	
2025	Children's Book Award	Older Readers	The Clockwork Conspiracy	Shortlisted	
2026	Edward Stanford Travel Writing Awards	Children's Travel Book of the Year	Epic Cities	Shortlisted	
