= Lucy Christopher =

British/Australian author

- Born: Wales
- Citizenship: Australian and British
- Occupation: Author
- Years active: 2009–present
- Agent(s): Greene and Heaton
- Known for: Stolen
- Website: lucychristopher.com

Lucy Christopher is a British/Australian author best known for her novel Stolen, which won the Branford Boase award 2010 in the UK, and the 2010 Gold Inky in Australia. Her second book, Flyaway, was shortlisted for the 2010 Costa Book Awards and the 2010 Waterstone's Children's Book Prize. She currently lives between Australia and the United Kingdom and has just finished her first book for an adult audience, RELEASE.

== Life ==
Lucy grew up in Australia and attended Mentone Girls' Grammar School. She works as a senior lecturer at in Creative Writing at UTAS, Tasmania. She studied for an MA in creative writing at Bath Spa University after which she became course director. She visited the school of Mexico "Instituto Verde Valle" in Guadalajara. There she gave a conference about her books.

== Bibliography ==
- Stolen (2009/2010) or in Spanish Robada una carta a mi secuestrador
- Flyaway (2012)
- The Killing Woods (2013) or in Spanish El bosque del verdugo
- Storm-wake (5 April 2018)
- Shadow (2019)
- The Queen on Our Corner (2021)
- Release (2022)

== Awards ==
- Branford Boase award
- Printz Honor Award
- Southern Schools Book Award
- Gold Inky
- Hull Children's Book Award
