= The Chicken House =

Publishing company in the United Kingdom

- Parent company: Scholastic
- Founded: 2000; 25 years ago
- Founders: Barry Cunningham and Rachel Hickman
- Country of origin: United Kingdom
- Headquarters location: Frome, Somerset
- Distribution: Bounce Sales & Marketing (UK)
- Publication types: Books
- Fiction genres: Children's literature
- Official website: www.chickenhousebooks.com

The Chicken House is a publishing company owned by Scholastic Corporation, specialising in children's fiction.

Founded in 2000 by Barry Cunningham and Rachel Hickman as Chicken House Publishing, it was bought by Scholastic in 2005. It has introduced many new successful authors, including Cornelia Funke, Roderick Gordon and Brian Williams, Kevin Brooks, Lucy Christopher, Rachel Ward, M. G. Leonard, Rachel Grinti, Kiran Millwood Hargrave and Jasbinder Bilan. It is the UK publisher of the multi-million bestselling The Maze Runner series.

== The Times/Chicken House Children’s Fiction Competition ==
The Times/Chicken House Children's Fiction Competition was launched in 2008 by Chicken House and The Times newspaper.

The annual competition is for full manuscripts suitable for readers aged between 7 and 18 by unpublished, unagented writers. The grand prize is a publishing contract worth £10,000. In 2019 a second prize was introduced to mark the competition's tenth anniversary, with a publishing contract worth £7,500 awarded to the Chairman's Choice. Terms and Conditions can be found on the Chicken House website.

Winners of the Competition in Chronological Order

- 2008: Emily Diamand, Flood Child
- 2009: Sophia Bennett, Threads
- 2010: Janet Foxley, Muncle Trogg
- 2011: Kieran Larwood, Freaks
- 2012: Fletcher Moss, Poison Boy
- 2013: Wendy Constance, Brave
- 2014: Kerr Thomson, The Sound of Whales
- 2015: Laurel Remington, The Secret Cooking Club
- 2016: Nicki Thornton, The Last Chance Hotel
- 2017: Jasbinder Bilan, Asha & the Spirit Bird
- 2018: Trudi Tweedie, The Pure Heart
- 2019: Efua Traoré, Children of the Quicksands
- 2019: Richard Pickard, The Peculiar Tale of the Tentacle Boy (Chairman's Choice)
- 2020: Varsha Shah, Adjay and the Mumbai Rail Times
- 2020: Fran Hart, The Other Ones (Chairman's Choice)
- 2021: Emily Randall, The Flood Child
- 2021: Alison Stegert, The Remarkables (IET 150 Award)
- 2022: Sarah Harrison, Eddie's Demons
- 2022: Jess Popplewell, All Hell (Chairman's Choice)
- 2023: Marisa Linton, The Pouka King
- 2023: Asli Jensen, Love On Sight (Lime Picture's Prize)

== See also ==
- Scholastic Corporation
