= Julia Eccleshare =

British journalist and critic (born 1951)

Julia Eccleshare MBE
- Born: 1951 (age 74–75); Cambridge, England, UK
- Occupations: Journalist and critic
- Awards: Eleanor Farjeon Award, 2000

Julia Eccleshare MBE (born 1951) is a British journalist and writer on the subject of children's books. She was Children's Books editor for The Guardian newspaper for more than ten years, at least from 2000, until 2016. She is also an editorial contributor and advisor for the website Love Reading 4 Kids. She is a recipient of the Eleanor Farjeon Award. She was appointed children's director of the Hay Festival in 2016.

== Life and career ==
Eccleshare was born in Cambridge, England, and grew up in North London, the third of four children of Colin Eccleshare, a publisher with Cambridge University Press, and Liz, a history teacher.

Eccleshare was children's book editor of the Times Literary Supplement from 1974 to 1978.

She served as non-fiction and picture book editor at Penguin Books children's imprint Puffin Books from 1978 to 1980, and as fiction editor at Hamish Hamilton children's books from 1980 to 1984, before returning to freelance book reviewing.

She selected hundreds of books for Children's Books of the Year from 1985 to 1993. The annual exhibition and annotated list had been established c.1970 by the National Book League (later renamed Booktrust) and had missed one year before its 1985 resumption.

Eccleshare has also served on many book award panels including the Whitbread Children's Book Award in 2001, and chaired the Nestlé Smarties Book Prize panel from 2001 to its conclusion in 2007. In 2000 she co-founded the Branford Boase Award for an outstanding novel for young people by a first-time writer, and continues to chair its panel of judges. From 2000 to 2012, she chaired the panel of three children's writers who judge the Guardian Children's Fiction Prize.

In 2000, she won the Eleanor Farjeon Award in recognition of "her outstanding contribution to children's books".

Eccleshare was children's books editor for The Guardian newspaper for more than a decade, until 2016. She has also made regular appearances on the BBC Radio 4 programmes Open Book and Front Row. In 2014, she was appointed Head of Policy and Advocacy for Public Lending Right. She was appointed Member of the Order of the British Empire (MBE) in the 2014 Birthday Honours for services to children's literature. She was an awarded an Honorary Doctor of Letters (DLitt, Hons) by the University of Worcester in 2014.

In 2016, Eccleshare was appointed director of the Children's Programme of the Hay Festival. She has also judged and chaired the judging panels of many significant children's literature prizes, including the Whitbread Children's Book Award in 2001, and chairing the Nestlé Smarties Book Prize panel from 2001 until it ended in 2007.

She is married and has four children, and lives in London.

== Books ==
Eccleshare covered the Harry Potter series for Continuum (Contemporary classics of children's literature) when four volumes were in print. Following an introduction on "major success in children's books", Enid Blyton and others, she interpreted the Potter stories (part 2) and the Potter phenomenon including its impact on writing for children (parts 3–5).

== Selected works ==
- Children's Books of the Year, 1985; 1986; 1987; 1988; 1989; 1990; 1991; 1992; 1993 (London: National Book League/Booktrust/Children's Book Foundation; in association with Andersen Press from 1988) —catalogues of the annual exhibition
- Treasure Islands: The Woman's Hour Guide to Children's Reading (BBC Books, 1988)
- British Literature for Young People: A Bibliography 1990–2000 (British Council, 2001)
- A Guide to the Harry Potter Novels (Continuum, 2002, Contemporary Classics of Children's Literature series)
- Beatrix Potter to Harry Potter: Portraits of Children's Writers (National Portrait Gallery, 2002) —catalogue of an exhibition
- The Rough Guide to books for teenagers (London: Rough Guides, 2002, ISBN 9781843531388), by Eccleshare and Nicholas Tucker —"more than 200 books reviewed"
- 1001 Children's Books You Must Read Before You Grow Up (Cassell, 2009, ISBN 9781844036714)
