= David Fickling Books =

British publishing house

- Founder: David Fickling
- Country of origin: United Kingdom
- Headquarters location: Oxford
- Publication types: books
- Official website: www.davidficklingbooks.com

David Fickling Books Ltd (DFB) is a publishing company which was founded in 1999 and became an independent publishing house in July 2013 following 12 years (2001-2013) with Scholastic and later Random House. They have published several prize-winning and bestselling books including Lyra's Oxford (from the world of His Dark Materials) by Philip Pullman, The Curious Incident of the Dog in the Night-time by Mark Haddon, The Boy in the Striped Pyjamas by John Boyne, Bing Bunny by Ted Dewan, Pants by Nick Sharratt and Giles Andreae, Before I Die by Jenny Downham, Trash by Andy Mulligan (shortly to be a major movie with script by Richard Curtis) and A Boy and a Bear in a Boat by Dave Shelton.

They are the only other publishing house to have ever won the Branford Boase Award three times, other than Chicken House’s Barry Cunningham.

DFB also works closely with The Phoenix, a weekly story comic for children which David Fickling founded.
