= 仁 =

仁 may refer to:

- Hitoshi, Japanese masculine given name
- In (Korean name)#Given name, Korean given name
- Ren (given name), Chinese and Japanese masculine given name
- Ren (philosophy)

== See also ==
- In (disambiguation)
- Ren (disambiguation)
