= Hitoshi =

- Gender: Male

Origin
- Origin: Japanese
- Meaning: Different meanings depending on the kanji used

Hitoshi (written: 仁, 均, 等, 一, 斎, 鈞, 仁志, 仁史, 人志, 仁司 or ひとし in hiragana) is a masculine Japanese given name. Notable people with the name include:

- Hitoshi Akamatsu (赤松仁司), Japanese video game designer
- Hitoshi Aoyagi (青柳 仁士; born 1978), Japanese politician
- Hitoshi Asada (浅田 均; born 1950), Japanese politician
- Hitoshi Ashida (芦田 均; 1887–1959), Japanese politician
- Hitoshi Ashinano (芦奈野 ひとし; born 1963), Japanese manga artist
- Hitoshi Doi (土井 仁志; born 1963), Japanese baseball player
- Hitoshi Fugo (普後 均; born 1947), Japanese photographer
- Hitoshi Fujie (藤江 均; born 1986), Japanese baseball player
- Hitoshi Goto (後藤 斎; born 1957), Japanese politician
- Hitoshi Hase (長谷 等; born 1973), Japanese lightweight rower
- Hitoshi Hidetada (日翔志 英忠; born 1997), Japanese sumo wrestler
- Hitoshi Igarashi (五十嵐 一; 1947—1991), Japanese scholar and murder victim
- Hitoshi Ikebe (池部 鈞; 1886–1969), Japanese painter
- Hitoshi Imamura (今村 均; 1886–1968), Japanese general
- Hitoshi Ishigaki (石垣 仁; born 1953), Japanese boxer
- Hitoshi Ishii (石井 仁司; born 1947), Japanese mathematician
- Hitoshi Iwaaki (岩明 均; born 1960), Japanese manga artist
- Hitoshi Kihara (木原 均; 1893–1986), Japanese geneticist
- Hitoshi Kikawada (黄川田 仁志; born 1970), Japanese politician
- Hitoshi Kimura (木村 仁; born 1934), Japanese politician
- Hitoshi Konno (紺野 仁; born 1934), Japanese basketball player
- Hitoshi Kumano (熊野 準; born 1991), Japanese professional wrestler
- Hitoshi Kumano-Go (熊野郷仁志; 1935–1982), Japanese mathematician
- Hitoshi Matsumoto (松本 人志; born 1963), Japanese comedian
- Hitoshi Matsushima (松島 仁; born 1980), Japanese footballer
- Hitoshi Morishita (森下 仁之) (1967–2025), Japanese footballer and manager
- Hitoshi Morishita (森下 仁志; born 1972), Japanese footballer
- Hitoshi Motoshima (本島 等; 1922–2014), Japanese politicia
- Hitoshi Murayama (村山 斉; born 1964), Japanese physicist
- Hitoshi Nagai (永井 均; born 1951), Japanese philosopher
- Hitoshi Nakamura (中村 等; born 1949), Japanese ice hockey player
- Hitoshi Nakata (中田 仁司; born 1962), Japanese footballer and manager
- Hitoshi Nakazato (中里 斉; 1936–2010), Japanese-born American painter, printmaker, muralist and educator
- Hitoshi Nanba (難波日登志), Japanese director
- Hitoshi Narita, Japanese naval architect
- Hitoshi Nomura (野村 仁; 1945–2023), Japanese contemporary artist
- Hitoshi Nozaki (野崎 一; 1922–2019), Japanese chemist
- Hitoshi Ogawa (小河 等; 1956–1992), Japanese racing driver
- Hitoshi Ogawa (wheelchair rugby) (小川 仁士; born 1994), Japanese wheelchair rugby player
- Hitoshi Okamoto (岡本 仁志), Japanese musician
- Hitoshi Okamura (岡村 均; born 1952), Japanese scientist
- Hitoshi Okino (沖野 等; 1959–2009), Japanese football player and manager
- Hitoshi Okuda (奥田 ひとし; born 1963), Japanese manga artist
- Hitoshi Ono (大野 均; born 1978), Japanese rugby union player
- Hitoshi Oshitani (押谷 仁; born 1959), Japanese university professor
- Hitoshi Saito (斉藤 仁; born 1961), Japanese judoka
- Hitoshi Saito (athlete) (齋藤 仁志; born 1986), Japanese retired track and field sprinter
- Hitoshi Sakimoto (崎元 仁; born 1969), Japanese video game composer
- Hitoshi Sasaki (佐々木 等; 1891–1982), Japanese football player and manager
- Hitoshi Sato (佐藤 仁; born 1962), Japanese former cyclist
- Hitoshi Shiota (塩田 仁史; born 1981), Japanese footballer
- Hitoshi Shirato (白戸 仁; born 1958), Japanese former professional tennis player
- Hitoshi Sogahata (曽ヶ端 準; born 1979), Japanese former professional footballer
- Hitoshi Sugai (須貝 等; born 1962), Japanese judoka
- Hitoshi Takagi (高木 均; 1925–2004), Japanese voice actor
- Hitoshi Tamura (多村 仁志; born 1977), Japanese baseball player
- Hitoshi Taneda (種田 仁; born 1971), Japanese former Nippon Professional Baseball infielder
- Hitoshi Tenma (天間 一; born 1942), Japanese boxer
- Hitoshi Tochinohana (栃乃花 仁; born 1973), Japanese sumo wrestler
- Hitoshi Tomishima (冨嶋 均; born 1964), Japanese footballer
- Hitoshi Tomizawa (富沢 ひとし), Japanese manga artist
- Hitoshi Tsukiji (築地 仁; born 1947), Japanese photographer
- Hitoshi Ueki (植木 等; 1926–2007), Japanese actor, singer, comedian and musician
- Hitoshi Uematsu (植松 仁; born 1974), Japanese short track speed skater
- Hitoshi Usui (臼井 仁志; born 1988), Japanese footballer
- Hitoshi Yamakawa (山川 均; 1880–1958), Japanese socialist

== Fictional Characters ==
- Hitoshi Shinsō (心操 人使), character from My Hero Academia
- Hitoshi Tadano (只野仁), protagonist of Tokumei Kakarichō Tadano Hitoshi

== See also ==
- 11317 Hitoshi, a main-belt asteroid
