= Crystal Mask =

2001 novel by Katherine Roberts

- First edition
- Author: Katherine Roberts
- Illustrator: James Marsh
- Language: English
- Series: The Echorium Sequence
- Genre: Fantasy
- Publisher: The Chicken House
- Publication date: August 1, 2001
- Publication place: United Kingdom
- English publication date: Aug 1, 2001
- Media type: Print (Hardback & Paperback)
- Pages: 255 (first edition, hardback)
- ISBN: 1-903434-19-X
- OCLC: 46910021
- Preceded by: Song Quest
- Followed by: Dark Quetzal

Crystal Mask is a fantasy novel by English writer Katherine Roberts. It is the second novel in The Echorium Sequence, and it is the sequel to Song Quest. The novel was first published in 2001 by the Chicken House.

is set in the world of the Isle of Echoes where the Singers live in The Echorium. The Singers have many special abilities, the most important of which is knowledge of the Songs of Power: Challa for sleep, Kashe for laughter, Shi for sadness, Aushan for fear and Yehn for death. All Singer children, called novices, learn these Songs, but if their voices do not last into adulthood they receive a mild form of Yehn which makes them forget the Songs. The Singers can also farlisten to hear over great distances, an ability enhanced by the bluestone which the Isle is made up of, and hear truth. The Singers help to keep peace on the mainland, and produce treaties to protect Half Creatures – the half-human beings with knowledge of the Songs, which include merlee (fish people), naga (water snake people) and quetzal (bird people).

During the novel Song Quest, set twenty years before Crystal Mask, the Singers encountered a powerful enemy in Khizpriest Frazhin, who harnessed the powers of a strange black crystal called the khiz to manipulate people's thoughts and memories. He attempted to destroy the Echorium by kidnapping a novice, Rialle, and was only stopped by the efforts of another novice, Kherron, who had originally been taken in by Frazhin. Although Frazhin was apparently killed by quetzal after the Battle of the Merlee at the end of Song Quest, and finished off by being sung Yehn over a distance, his body was never recovered. While the khiz was thought to be destroyed, the arrival of a girl for treatment with memories of a khiz crystal mask which steals thoughts leads the Echorium to believe that Frazhin may have survived.

== Plot summary ==
Renn, a gifted but often bullied Eight Year novice in the Echorium who can speak to Half-Creatures, is asked to assist the Singers by translating for Shaiala Two-Hoof, a wild girl brought to the Island for treatment, who claims to have been raised by centaurs. Although initially the pair argue, meeting Rialle helps to calm Shaiala and she begins to remember, enough to reveal that her memories were wiped using a mask made of khiz. Second Singer Kherron takes this excuse to insist that Shaiala and Renn leave with him to search for Frazhin, the escaped khizpriest whose body was never found. After this revelation, Rialle takes Shaiala, who was very disturbed by her recollections, and Renn to come to the cave where she lives and meet the merlee. While Shaiala swims with the merlee, Renn rejects their friendly offers and is horrified to learn that "crazy" Rialle is his mother.

The next day, Renn and Shaiala leave with Kherron on the Wavesong, heading to Southport. On the journey, Renn is irritable and offends Shaiala by refusing to believe her tales of centaurs. Kherron also gives Shaiala a bluestone necklace. Upon arrival, the group begins to explore Southport and Shaiala, despite being closely guarded by a pentad of orderlies including Frenn and Lazim, escapes, only to become lost in the rough part of the city. She is kidnapped and thrown in a cellar with several street children, and Erihan, the son of Lord Nahar, the leader of the Kalerei tribe of Horselords. The children are taken away by barge towards the Plains.

While Kherron attempts to trace Shaiala through her bluestone necklace, they rapidly lose track of the barge. Meanwhile, the children meet "Aunt Yashra", a seemingly kindly pregnant woman who asks to hear each child sing, and then chooses some to return to her "Singing Palace" while others are to be "gotten rid of". This disturbs Shaiala, who recognises Yashra, and causes friction between the children, with many of those chosen wanting to stay. However, after three days of cramped conditions, they hatch a plan to escape. Shaiala kicks a hole in the side of the boat for the children to escape through, but several are left behind as the boat begins to sink, attracting the crew's attention. Shaiala and the other remaining children are taken to Aunt Yashra's camp, where Yashra uses the khiz mask to make them passive. Shaiala remembers the mask and, with Erihan's help, escapes. Shaiala and Erihan steal Yashra's horses and head onto the Plains together to search for tracks - Erihan for Horselord's, Shaiala for centaur's.

Meanwhile, Renn is asked to track Shaiala's bluestone, as novices are more sensitive than Singers. Although they follow the barge for a few days, Renn is shocked when the bluestone is suddenly underwater, and he fears Shaiala has drowned. However, the bluestone is soon retrieved by a Half-Creature similar to a merlee, known as a naga. The Singers follow the naga upriver, and eventually arrange a meeting. The naga shows them its collection of 'sparklies' – consisting of Shaiala's bluestone, a piece of khiz and Erihan's dagger. Seeing Erihan's dagger, the Singers are attacked by Lord Nahar and the Kaleri, who have been following the Singers in their search for Erihan. After a brief confrontation, the two groups agree to work together, and the Horselords tell the Singers about the Sunless Valley, reachable only through the Pass of Silence, where they suspect the children have been taken. Renn contacts the naga again and, in exchange for the return of a 'sparkly', it tells them where it found the dagger – with Shaiala's bluestone – and where it found the khiz, in the mountains. However, it leaves before Renn can ask if it knows another way into the Sunless Valley.

Meanwhile, Shaiala and Erihan eventually track down Shaiala's herd of centaurs by the Dancing Canyons. Seeing them, Shaiala remembers why no one else had spotted them - the adults use herdstones to bend light around the herd, rendering it invisible. Shaiala offers to take herdstones to the centaur foals enslaved in the Sunless Valley, and she and Erihan travel there through underwater caves, guided by naga, within which they see khiz crystal poisoning the naga eggs. Meanwhile, the Singers attempt to get through the Pass of Silence, a pass so precarious that the slightest noise can start an avalanche. However, when they are attacked, Renn accidentally cries out, setting off an avalanche. Frenn and another orderly are killed, Kherron is captured, a crystal forced into his throat, and is taken away, and only Renn's quick thinking saves himself and the other orderlies from the second avalanche set off by the Harai guarding the Pass. Grateful, Lazim finally explains how Frazhin disappeared after the Battle of the Merlee twenty years ago, and, although those sent to find his body disappeared, he was not considered a threat after the khiz was destroyed.

While the orderlies attempt to disable to gong used to set off avalanches in the Pass of Silence - thereby allowing Lord Nahar and the Kaleri to pass through safely - Renn hides, only to be caught by Yashra as she brings in the captured street children, and be taken to the Khizalace - Yashra's stronghold. However, there is trouble in the Valley - Shaiala and Erihan have arrived to find the captured centaurs working as slaves to mine khiz, and have freed them with herdstones, leading a revolution. The angry foals storm the palace, leaving Shaiala and Erihan no choice but to follow. They get inside the Khizalace, but are soon separated from the centaurs. Instead, they find a group of street children, apparently hypnotised, and follow them to their dormitory, which is dominated by the presence of a giant khiz crystal. Although the pair quickly disable the guards, they are unable to break the crystal's hold on the children, and only just keep from succumbing themselves.

Renn is taken to see Singer Kherron in the dungeons, who is clearly badly injured by the khiz crystal in his throat. Frazhin arrives, and attempts to force Kherron to teach the children in the Khizalace the Songs of Power, scorning the Singer's attempts to break free. Frazhin threatens that if Kherron does not help him, he will harm Renn - whom Frazhin believes to be Kherron's son. It is made clear in the conversation that Yashra's unborn child is Frazhin's. Renn is taken away, but escapes from his guards when he hears of a "wild centaur girl" causing havoc in the dormitories. He hurries to find Shaiala attempting to crack the khiz with her kicks, and helps her to crack the crystal and free the children. With the Khizalace shattering around them from the blow, the Harai flee, and Shaiala and Renn hurry to free Kherron, whose voice is badly damaged from the crystal, then join the battle outside.

With the arrival of the Kaleri, the battle has turned in the Singer's favour, at least until Yashra appears and seals the gates against them with khiz power, trapping them inside. Although she seems victorious, capturing Erihan as a hostage and controlling the khiz against the Kaleri, she is distracted when Singer Kherron warns her to keep an eye on Frazhin, who is trying to escape without her. She hurries after him, and between Renn's singing and the centaur's kicks, the gates are destroyed. When the group catches up to Yashra, she is watching from the lakeshore as Frazhin on a boat in the centaur calls to the naga. Although they help him initially, they suddenly turn on him and pull him under the water. Yashra, trapped by the Singers, is offered a choice: immediate execution or life on the Echorium until her child is born followed by a course of Yehn. She chooses the Echorium, for the sake of her child, and protests before she is taken away that Frazhin's crimes are the Singer's fault, for destroying his hopes of joining them when he was a child.

After leaving the valley, Shaiala and Renn forget their earlier disagreements, and with Renn's singing to assist her, Shaiala successfully cracks rock to find her own herdstone. A songless Kherron, after reporting to the Echorium with Renn's help, admits that, while he would be glad to call himself Renn's father, Rialle had a close relationship with Frenn - who Renn was named for - and Renn's parentage is uncertain. Shaiala joins the Kaleri to learn to be a tribeswoman from Erihan's mother, and Renn returns to the Echorium, where he reconciles with Rialle and the merlee.

== Characters ==
=== Major characters ===
- Shaiala – A human child brought up by centaurs, but her tribe was ransacked and the centaur foals taken to the mines in the Sunless Valley to work for Yashra mining khiz. Later, she is brought to the Isle of Echoes, home of the Singers, for a dose of Singer healing to regain her memory that was erased, discovering that it was erased by Frazhin using khiz crystal. She travels for a short while with Renn and the Singers to Southport but becomes separated when she runs away from their grasp and ends up captured by child snatches. Escaping from her captors, she later travels with Erihan; one of the other captured children to regroup with her centaur and find Erihan's father and tribe.
- Renn – A novice singer from The Echorium who is the son of singer Rialle and Frenn. He discovers he is able to understand Shaiala's half creature language after encountering her at the Five Thousand Steps on the Isle of Echoes. Renn is unfriendly and abusive towards Shaiala showing a stubborn attitude towards her and the trip he is brought along on. Renn realises his differences with Shaiala towards the end of the story and they stop arguing. Renn is taken with Kherron on a quest to find more about Shaiala's past and the Khizpriest Frazhin. He discovers his talents and destroys the large khiz crystal at the Khizalace, destroying the mind control device that was controlling the captured children that were being held there.
- Kherron – The Second Singer of The Echorium and enemy of Lord Frazhin who has the ability to control the powers of the khiz crystal. He was also part of the previous novel in the trilogy called Song Quest as novice Kherron being one of the main characters associated with the plot. He has had a troubled past and shows this through his forceful and impatient characteristics as Second Singer.
- Erihan – The son of the Horse Lord Nahar and Prince of the Kalerei who gets captured by the Harai when he is carried downstream a river to Southport and picked by them. He makes friends with Shaiala; also from the Purple Plains and joins with her to find his father and tribe and her centaur tribe. This ultimately ends in a final quest to free the children and centaur slaves at the Khizalace.
- Nahar – The leader of the Kalerei who helps Kherron and the Singers to defeat Yashra as they share a common goal to free the children slaves and centaurs at the Khizalace which she and Frazhin are holding. He has a son named Erihan, Prince of the Kalerei who is also a main character in the novel. Lord Nahar's assistance at the Khizalace results in a victory with his army of the Kalerei and the Singers, they defeat Frazhin again and capture Yashra.
- Yashra – An evil woman who owns a mask made from khiz crystal that she uses to link and keep in contact with the half-living Lord Frazhin. She is an enemy of The Echorium who helps Frazhin enslave human children and centaurs that they use to quarry for the khiz crystal she and Frazhin need. She later has a child named Kyarra who is mentioned as the unborn child in Crystal Mask and later appears in the last novel of the trilogy Dark Quetzal.
- Frazhin – An evil male character who Yashra works with. He also features in the prequel Song Quest as the Khizpriest; manipulating the minds of others and using the khiz-crystals to detect if someone is lying, as well as other functions like wiping memories. He works with Yashra to enslave centaurs and human children for their own purposes. He is believed to have died at the end of Crystal Mask as the nagas looked to have killed him at the lake outside the Khizalace but as the sequel is written it seems he survived.

=== Minor characters ===
- Imari, Laphie and the other captured children – Imari and Laphie are characters Shaiala encounters once she is captured by the Harai in the docks of Southport. Erihan (who later becomes a major part within the novel), Imari, Laphie and Teggi are some of the more prominent children captured by Harai's men, with Teggi being the more charismatic character influencing and leading the children.
- Rafiz Longshadow – One of the captured centaurs taken to the Sunless Valley to work under the mines to collect khiz crystals for Frazhin and Yashra. A centaur friend of Shaiala who appears at the beginning in the description of one of Shaiala's flashbacks and at the end when Shaiala frees the centaurs and uses the herdstones to gain an advantage against destroying the palace.
- Kamara Silvermane – Another one of the captured centaurs taken to the Sunless Valley to work under mines. Kamara is also a friend of Shaiala's who helps the other centaurs destroy the Khizalace.
- Alaira and Geran – Both appear at the very beginning of the novel as classmates of Renn; novice singer at The Echorium. Alaira and Geran bully Renn at times specifically at the beginning they bullied him into going with them to observe a crazy being brought to The Echorium which therefore led to the discovery of his talents (being able to speak half-creature language).
- Ollaron – A teacher at The Echorium who features at the beginning of the novel, teaching Renn's class a history lesson of The Echorium. Ironically he talks about the "Battle of the Merlee" which is referring to the plotline within the prequel Song Quest when Rialle persuades the Merlee to conjure storms and destroy the ships Frazhin was bringing to the Isle of Echoes. Ollaron explains what happened to Lord Javelly from Song Quest, who apparently died from the Yehn the Singers were singing at the Pentangle on the Isle of Echoes which appears inconceivable as it is too far away to be transmitted that far but this explained as the Lord Javelly was given a trust gift by the second singer in Song Quest which ultimately killed him as the bluestone necklace the Lord was given amplified the song and killed the wearer which was Lord Javelly. Ollaron is described as an old ancient man almost as old as the events he teachers within his history lessons.
- First Singer Graia – The First Singer of The Echorium during the times of the Crystal Mask. She features in Song Quest as one of the teachers of The Echorium. She appears once in the book at the very beginning when she is in the Pentangle with the rest of the Singers trying to heal a crazy (person who is not right in the head and in this case has a loss of memory).
- Singer Rialle – No longer a full-time Singer, Rialle from Song Quest appears at the beginning during the Pentangle session and afterwards when she takes Renn and Shaiala to see her home on the Isle of Echoes which is in a cave away from The Echorium. The most likely location of this cave is probably where Kherron in Song Quest went to investigate which was a series of caves along the beach.
- Lazim – From Song Quest he has a minor part throughout the novel and travels with Second Singer Kherron and the other Singers on their quest to investigate Shaiala's story. He survived the avalanche at the Pass of Silence and helped destroy the Khizalace. He is an orderly not a singer as he joins The Echorium in Song Quest.
- Frenn – From Song Quest he also has a minor part, travelling with the Singer group on their quest. Frenn dies during the avalanche at the Pass of Silence and is later revealed as Renn's father. Frenn is not officially a Singer but an orderly.

== Major themes ==
The plot is similar to Song Quest as the story follows young novices who have the chance to adventure outside The Echorium, which is rare for their age. Crystal Mask relies on Song Quest its storyline to be understood; for example about Renn's parents and concerning the centaur tribes. Crystal Mask contains many instances of arguments and abuse towards each of the characters, such as the arguments between Renn and Shaiala with Renn's stubbornness towards Shaiala's ignorance and impatience.

Crystal Mask is based on a general plotline, involving setting off on a quest, becoming separated, and each party finding its own way to a final destination, gaining experience, acquiring allies, and overcoming difficulties along the way.

The Echorium Sequence uses themes from Ursula K. Le Guin's Earthsea and Anne McCaffrey's Pern in the sense of merlee and half creatures in conjunction with human beings and singers.

=== Half-creatures ===
The usage of half-creatures is a theme throughout The Echorium Sequence as the general plot behind each of the three novels concerns or involves half creatures or mentions of them through references. Crystal Mask focuses on centaurs, which are half creatures native to the Dancing Canyons who are enslaved by the khizpriests.

Also, the Singers have a bond with half-creatures at a young age as some novices are able to understand the half-creatures' languages, but this eventually fades as they become older, with the exception of Rialle who has retained her ability to communicate with them.

Through Crystal Mask, a symbiotic relationship is seen between the half-creatures and the Singers. At the beginning of the book, it describes how humans and half-creatures lived in harmony with each other, but the humans went back on their old ways and started to progress and forget about half creatures. The Singers were the group of people who moved away from all this to keep to their old traditions so they moved to the Isle of Echoes and this is how the mutual relationship between half-creatures and humans was kept throughout the history of the trilogy.

=== Khiz ===
Khiz plays a major part in the Crystal Mask, with the manipulation of the crystals for mind control and to erase people's memories. Yashra for example used the khiz-crystal to seduce children to come to her palace in the Sunless Valley and sing for her. Yashra and Frazhin both use khiz to keep in contact with other using masks as Frazhin is fatally injured and cannot come with her on her travels.

Khiz is also detrimental to the Singers ability to use their voice as it becomes weaker in the vicinity of khiz. Khiz also pollutes the nagas habitats, as described at the end of Crystal Mask that the khiz-crystals were polluting the nagas watercourse in the Sunless Valley.

=== Songs of Power ===
The Songs of Power were the songs used by the Singers for different situations and effects. The effects of these songs are:

- Challa – Dream Song. Most common form of healing. Puts people to sleep and helps people forget their troubles
- Kashe – Laughter Song. Wakes people up, and cures depression in them.
- Shi – Pain Song. Forces people to confront their pain and heals through tears.
- Aushan – Fear Song. Gives life to inner fears and makes people scream.
- Yehn – Death Song. Closes doors in the head. In extreme cases, leads to a form of living death.

Singers use these powers to control the environment around them and to keep peace within the region which they live in with humans and half-creatures. The songs have immense power and can only be dwarfed by the manipulation of khiz-crystals which dims the effect of the Songs.

== Allusions/references to other works ==
Crystal Mask relies on its prequel, Song Quest, for the reader to fully understand the novel's storyline. The plot, as regards Renn's true parents, can partially be explained from Song Quest with the friendship of Frenn and Rialle. Some of the main characters in Song Quest feature in Crystal Mask, following on 20 years into the future but do not have a major part within the storyline.

The setting is roughly the same as Song Quest, located at the Isle of Echoes and the shoreline of the continent to the west of the island. At the beginning is a scene set in a history lesson being taught by Singer Ollaron who refers to events 20 years in the past that occurred in the novel Song Quest. The theme of half-creatures is still apparent within Crystal Mask; like in Song Quest, they play a major part within the storyline.

== Literary criticism ==
Crystal Mask received mixed reviews with several negative comments; Goodtoread.org commented that, "The characters seem stilted, never really fulfilling their initial promise," and that it relies too much on the previous book Song Quest to truly appreciate the plot behind some of the novel.

Also, Goodtoread.org said, "The characters of Renn and Shaiala who interest the reader at first quickly become pale and flat plot devices with only occasional moments of relief and colour."

Other comments made by Goodtoread.org were, "Music clearly plays an important, almost mystical, part in the history of the story. Song is used by those trained in its use for healing, laughter, discipline, even death. There is no sign, however, of recreational music."

Kirkus Reviews said, "It is difficult to distinguish heroes and villains on the basis of either their actions or their attitudes," referring to the fact that the main characters appear aggressive and violent towards each other as well as ignorant and abusive. According to Kirkus Reviews, Erihan is the only truly appealing character within Crystal Mask, showing kindness and friendship towards Shaiala. Kirkus Reviews also said, "As the final confrontation sputters into an inconclusive anticlimax, the one interesting revelation, which might explain some contradictions, is pointlessly repudiated," referring to discovery of Renn's true parents. Kirkus Reviews concluded in their review that "Fans of the first book might enjoy the updates on favorite characters; but hardly anyone else will care. Crystal Mask fails to include any likable inhabitants."

But author Jacqueline Wilson said, "There are so many deft, exciting and original touches. I raced through it occasionally moved to tears."

The majority of reviewers raised the point that the novel was poorly concluded and lacked a climax and interest at events such as the discovery of Renn's true parents and the destruction of Yashra's palace. Reviewers pointed out that the characters lacked development with most of the speech, including arguments and abuse between the main characters. The recurring characters from Song Quest, such as Kherron, also showed similar characteristics to the prequel such as their ignorance and weak mindedness. Other comments raised were concerned with the plot, that it was too slow to start with and contained dull and plain characters bringing little interest at first. It is also noted that it is better to read the prequel before reading Crystal Mask as many of the sub-plots are not understandable from reading only the second book.

Positive comments raised were the original touches used within the book, such as the concept of Singers and half creatures which have references to other novels' work. The School Library Journal said the world she has created is original and detailed with cliff hangers and realistic responses from the characters to situations raised in the plot. The School Library Journal also said the novel had a consistent pace and mystery surrounding the plot to maintain interest, contradicting what was raised by Kirkus Reviews who stated the novel as having an "inconclusive anticlimax".

== Release details ==
- 2001, UK, The Chicken House, ISBN 1-903434-19-X, Pub date 1 Aug 2001, Hardback
- 2002, UK, The Chicken House, ISBN 1-903434-56-4, Pub date 1 Jul 2002, Paperback
