= Dark Quetzal =

2003 novel by Katherine Roberts

- First edition front cover of the paperback version
- Author: Katherine Roberts
- Language: English
- Series: The Echorium Sequence
- Genre: Fantasy
- Publisher: The Chicken House
- Publication date: 1 March, 2003
- Publication place: United Kingdom
- Media type: Print (Hardback & Paperback)
- Pages: 256 (first edition, paperback)
- ISBN: 1-903434-67-X
- OCLC: 51841395
- Preceded by: Crystal Mask

Dark Quetzal is a fantasy novel by British writer Katherine Roberts, first published in 2003 by The Chicken House. It is the final book in The Echorium Sequence and is the sequel to Crystal Mask, set 11 years after the events of that book. The main characters are Kyarra, Frazhin and Yashra's daughter who was raised as a singer, and Night Plume, a quetzal (half-man, half-bird) who has grown up under Frazhin's control.

== Plot introduction ==
Dark Quetzal is set in the world of the Isle of Echoes where the Singers live in The Echorium. The Singers have many special abilities, the most important of which is knowledge of the Songs of Power: Challa for sleep, Kashe for laughter, Shi for sadness, Aushan for fear and Yehn for death. All Singer children, called novices, learn these Songs, but if their voices do not last into adulthood they receive a mild form of Yehn which makes them forget the Songs. The Singers can also farlisten to hear over great distances, an ability enhanced by the bluestone which the Isle is made up of, and hear truth. The Singers help to keep peace on the mainland, and produce treaties to protect Half Creatures - the half-human beings with knowledge of the Songs, which include merlee (fish people), naga (water snake people), quetzal (bird people) and centaurs (horse people).

During the novel Song Quest, set thirty one years before Dark Quetzal, the Singers encountered a powerful enemy in Khizpriest Frazhin, who harnessed the powers of a strange black crystal called the khiz to manipulate people's thoughts and memories. He attempted to destroy the Echorium by kidnapping a novice, Rialle, and was only stopped by the efforts of another novice, Kherron, who had originally been taken in by Frazhin. Although thought dead for many years, he returned eleven years before Dark Quetzal, joining with Lady Yashra of the Harai to kidnap street children and enslave centaurs in an attempt to build a Khizalace school of song to rival the Echorium. They were stopped by Rialle's novice son Renn and Shaiala, a girl raised by centaurs, and it appeared that Frazhin was drowned by naga while trying to escape. Lady Yashra was captured and sung Yehn, and her unborn child by Frazhin was raised as a normal novice of the Echorium. However, suspicions are raised when first Rialle, then Frazhin's daughter Kyarra, go missing.

== Plot summary ==
Promising final year novice Kyarra is disappointed when she alone in her class is forbidden from going to the beach to try to contact the merlee about the disappearance of Rialle. Although she has moved up a year because of her promising voice, she fears that she will be rejected and turned into an orderly. Her sense of disappointment is only worsened when her best friend Caell hears the merlee, and receives a message from them that Kyarra's parents were not Singers. The merlee claim her mother is living in Windy Corner, waiting to hear from Kyarra, and together, Kyarra and Caell sneak out to find her. They arrive just in time to find Kyarra's mother being kidnapped - Kyarra is also taken, apparently expected to have come, and Caell tries to follow them with the merlee and is nearly drowned.

Meanwhile, in the Quetzal Forest, Night Plume, the black-feathered leader of a flock of quetzal, is annoyed to be sent for by the Starmaker - Frazhin, who is using the khiz to brainwash and control groups of half-creatures raised by his priests, including the merlee who sent the message to Caell. Night Plume is asked to listen to Rialle as she is fed a memory drug made from yellow flowers, and store what he hears about the Starmaker's daughter - Kyarra - in the Memoryplace, the quetzal's collective ancestral memory. He does as he is asked, but Rialle's songs begin to break the Starmaker's hold on him, and when he is released he attempts to make contact with wild quetzal, getting himself and his friend Sky Swooper in trouble. Although Frazhin still believes Night Plume is under his control, he holds Sky Swooper captive to ensure loyalty. Summoning Night Plume to the temple, Frazhin orders him and his flock to accompany Kyarra on her journey through Quetzal Forest - although Night Plume is distracted by a message in Wild Speech from Rialle imploring him to fly to the Echorium for help.

Kyarra is transported to the edge of Quetzal Forest by Asil, a famous pirate. On the journey she is watched over by Asil's daughter Jilian who, along with the rest of the pirates, wears khiz stars to protect themselves from Kyarra's singing. She also bonds with her mother, who was left helpless by the Yehn she was given and is completely incapable of caring for herself. Nevertheless, Kyarra feels very protective of her, and sings one of the pirates Shi for attempting to harm her. The group just reach the edge of the forest when they are suddenly attacked by wild quetzal. Kyarra's song helps herself, her mother and Jilian escape, but they are unexpectedly captured by Shaiala and some centaurs with herstones. Recognising Yashra, Shaiala takes the group and other captured pirates to the Kaleri.

Night Plume's flock arrives just in time to see Kyarra vanish into green light, and Night Plume realises he, unlike the enchanted quetzal, is free to travel past the edge of the Forest. He orders the flock to delay their return, and flies over the sea, but cannot find the island. Instead he lands on a ship, where he meets Caell, Renn and Kherron journeying to the mainland to search for Kyarra. When he reveals his ability to speak human speech, Kherron becomes suspicious, particularly as Night Plume admits to being raised by Frazhin. Night Plume faithfully passes on Rialle's message, including a warning that Frazhin is trying to poison the Echorium, and that he saw Kyarra vanish into green light - a sign Renn recognises as being Shaiala's work. They reach Silvertown and learn it has been poisoned - although for most residents this is not fatal - and the group encounters Lord Azri. Telling him about Frazhin, Azri agrees they must seek him out and attack, but the Singers must first fulfill their obligation to Kyarra and head to the Purple Plains to look for her.

In the Horselord's camp, Kyarra is horrified to learn of her mother's crimes, and maintains that her punishment was undeserved. WHile she is glad to hear that Yashra will be cared for by the Harai, she is horrified to learn that Jilian is to be used as bait for her father, putting her in great danger. At a meeting, the Horselords hear a prophecy from Speaks Many Tongues, an inhabitant of Quetzal Forest, warning of doom when the dark quetzal flies. As the prophecy is spoken, Frazhin's quetzal attack the camp and, in the confusion, Kyarra frees Jilian and escapes with Speaks Many Tongues into the forest. Night Plume, scouting ahead for the Singers, learns from his flock that Frazhin has punished Sky Swooper for Night Plume's disappearance. The flock attack Night Plume, and he is badly injured, although the arrival of the Singers protects him from the angry Horselords.

Kyarra, Jilian and Speaks Many Tongues journey into the forest, where Speaks Many Tongues insists on them meeting Xiancotl, the forest people's holy man, and travelling with him into the quetzal Memoryplace using yellow flowers. Before their arrival, they meet Shaiala, who has followed them with some centaurs, and she is invited to join them in the memory trance. Each girl asks a question: Shaiala successfully learns that the centaurs are uncorruptible because they do not hatch from eggs, but when Kyarra attempts to discover how to heal her mother, the memory trance is interrupted and instead she receives a summons from Frazhin. The disruption causes Xiancotl and Kyarra to pass out, and in the panic this causes Jilian, Shaiala and Kyarra escape to the centaurs. However, on Kyarra's insistence, they allow Frahin's naga to take her to him, where she hopes she will be able to subdue him with her Songs.

The Singers and the Horselords regroup and prepare to head into the Forest and attack Frazhin. Although initially concerned for Kyarra, they are appeased when Speaks Many Tongues informs them that she disappeared with Shaiala. Speaks Many Tongues warns that Frazhin is planning to use the yellow flowers gathered by Night Plume's flock to travel into the quetzal Memoryplace and replace it with one of his own making, in which Singers will no longer exist. Although most of the Singers are horrified by this, Kherron is distracted by the promise of a miracle healing potion which Speaks Many Tongues suggests might heal his voice. The next day, the army travels into the Forest and surrounds the volcano where Frazhin has made his Temple, which is beginning to erupt as he prepares to enter the Memoryplace.

With the help of the centaurs, who arrive with Shaiala and Jilian, the army breaches the crater and begins searching for Frazhin. Although Caell and Night Plume are told to wait outside, they grow restless, and make their way into the crater. Night Plume is horrified to see the bodies of the eldest and youngest quetzal, who were useless for the memory trance, along with Sky Swooper, punished for his disappearance by having her wings cut off before she was killed. Using wild speech, Night Plume breaks the memory trance on the other quetzal, and reasserts his leadership of the flock.

Kyarra is taken by Frazhin to a ball made of crystal, called the Fane. Frazhin plans to seal the pair of them inside it, and then be rolled into the volcano to protect them from the approaching Singers. Within the Fane, they will use the Memoryplace - its power heightened by the captive quetzal and the yellow flower drug sent to the Isle of the Echoes and Silvertown - to change history so that Yashra is healed and the Singers do not exist. Although reluctant, Kyarra feels she has no choice but to get into the Fane. Just as it is sealed, Caell arrives, making Kyarra believe that the memory trance has brought him back from being drowned by merlee.

Although the Singers rescue the Fane from the priests and end the volcano's eruption, they are unable to open the Fane, within which Kyarra is rapidly running out of air. Feeling they have no choice, Renn, Rialle, Caell, Night Plume and a newly healed Kherron sing Yehn, hoping that it will break Frazhin's power. Although the Fane opens, the Yehn does not affect Frazhin, and he takes Kyarra hostage before being brought down by Night Plume and Jilian. Five years later, Kyarra wakes from the Yehn with the help of the forest people's potions, and is greeted by a reformed Lady Yashra, also healed, along with Night Plume, Caell, Jilian and Rialle. Although she is initially confused, she learns that Frazhin is dead and the Half Creatures are free again. Frazhin has been revealed to be a half-Singer child who was born on the Isle, but rejected from the Echorium because of his resistance to the Songs. Kyarra resolves to learn how to become both a Singer and a Harai princess, and plans to become the Echorium's first female Second Singer.

== Characters ==
- Kyarra - A gifted novice at the Echorium who is shocked to learn that she is the daughter of Frazhin and Lady Yashra.
- Caell - Kyarra's close friend in the Echorium who can talk to Half Creatures, and later forms a close friendship with Night Plume.
- Singer Kherron - A Songless ex-Second Singer who is resentful and desperate to sing again.
- Singer Renn - The newly appointed Second Singer sent to recover Kyarra.
- Singer Graia - The First Singer of the Echorium.
- Singer Rialle - A claustrophobic Singer with a close bond to merlee who is kidnapped by Frazhin.
- Night Plume - A dark-coloured quetzal, leader of a flock under Frazhin's control, who is freed by Rialle's songs.
- Yashra - Kyarra's mother, who received Yehn for her crimes in Crystal Mask and is now helpless.
- Frazhin - A disfigured man who controls Half Creatures using khiz crystal.
- Shaiala - A Kaleri woman with a close bond to the centaurs.
- Erihan - A Kaleri prince, and later leader of the tribe.
- Lord Nahar - Erihan's father, the initial leader of the tribe.
- Xiancotl - Holy man of the forest people.
- Speaks Many Tongues - Translator for the forest people.
- Lord Zorahan - Leader of the Harai tribe.
- Lord Azri - Karchlord.
- Lianne - A novice at the Echorium who bullies Kyarra.
- Jilian - Daughter of a famous pirate, Asil, she helps to kidnap Kyarra but then befriends her.

== Reception ==
Kirkus reviewed the novel stating that it was "burdened with an oddly pedestrian nomenclature, undermines the sense of wonder, while the anticlimactic resolution is likely to leave readers vaguely dissatisfied."

== See also ==
- The Echorium
