= Ren =

Ren or REN may refer to:

== People ==
- Ren Gill, or Ren, Welsh musician
- Ren (South Korean singer), member of South Korean boy band NU'EST
- Renforshort, Canadian singer formerly known as Ren
- MC Ren, rapper from the group N.W.A.
- Ren (given name), a mostly Japanese given name, includes a list of people and fictional characters with the name
- Ren (surname) (任), Chinese surname, includes a list of people and fictional characters with the name
- Raw Egg Nationalist, British far-right influencer

== Places and buildings ==
- Ren County, in Hebei, China
- Ren, Iran, a village in Kerman Province, Iran
- Ren (building), a high-rise residential building in Seattle, Washington, United States
- Orenburg Airport, IATA code REN, civil airport in Russia

== Science and technology ==
- Renin, a gene also known as REN
- Ren, in anatomy, a kidney (from Latin)
- Ren (command), a shell command in computing
- Renanthera, abbreviated as Ren, an orchid genus
- Ringer equivalence number (REN), a number which denotes the loading effect of a telephone ringer on a telephone line

== Religion ==
- Ren, "name, identity", a part of the Ancient Egyptian concept of the soul or spirit
- Ren (philosophy), Confucian concept

== Other uses ==
- Ren (fictional weapon), an alternate term for lightsaber in the Star Wars franchise
- REN TV, a Russian free-to-air television network
- Techrules Ren, a Chinese sports car
- Redes Energéticas Nacionais (REN), Portuguese energy company

== See also ==
- Renn, a given name and surname
- Rennie (disambiguation)
