= Song Quest =

Fantasy novel by Katherine Roberts

- First edition
- Author: Katherine Roberts
- Cover artist: Harvey Parker and Alison Withey
- Language: English
- Series: The Echorium Sequence
- Genre: Fantasy Novel
- Publisher: Element Children's Books
- Publication date: 1 January, 1999
- Publication place: United Kingdom
- Media type: Print (Hardback & Paperback)
- Pages: 240 pp (first edition, hardback)
- ISBN: 1-903434-46-7
- OCLC: 46910015
- Followed by: Crystal Mask

Song Quest is a fantasy novel by Katherine Roberts. It is the first book in The Echorium Sequence, followed by Crystal Mask and Dark Quetzal. The novel was first published in 1999 by Chicken House as a hardback copy; later on in 2001, the first paperback was published. Song Quest was the winner of the Branford Boase Award in 2000 and was the first Branford Boase Award given out.

== Plot introduction ==
Song Quest is first set on the Isle of Echoes where the Singers live in The Echorium. The Singers have many special abilities, the most important of which is knowledge of the Songs of Power: Challa for sleep, Kashe for laughter, Shi for sadness, Aushan for fear and Yehn for death. All Singer children, called novices, learn these Songs, but if their voices do not last into adulthood they receive a mild form of Yehn which makes them forget the Songs. The Singers can also farlisten to hear over great distances, an ability enhanced by the bluestone which the Isle is made up of, and hear truth. The Singers help to keep peace on the mainland, and produce treaties to protect Half Creatures - the half-human beings with knowledge of the Songs, which include merlee (fish/human) and quetzal (bird people). Song Quest is about two Final Year novices who travel to the mainland - one with permission, one without - and must try to help the merlee and quetzal who are being mistreated and butchered by the Karchholders in the northern mountains.

== Plot summary ==
Singer Graia leads a class of final year novices from The Echorium to the beach, on the pretext of searching for the remains of a ship wreck. Kherron runs away from the group, eager to make his own discovery, and happens upon an injured sailor, named Cadzi, in a cave, whom he promises to help in return for a way off the Isle of Echoes. Meanwhile, Rialle, Frenn and Chissar explore the beach together until Rialle begins to feel faint and hear voices; the group quickly return to The Echorium, where First Singer Eliya tells Rialle she can hear the merlee, and asks her to leave with Second Singer Toharo on the Wavesong the next time it sails, to persuade the merlee to give the ship safe passage. While Rialle prepares for the journey, dismayed that Frenn has been taken for orderly training without saying goodbye, Kherron returns to the Echorium to try to warn the Singers about Cadzi's ship, only to storm off when he is ignored.

Rialle persuades the merlee to briefly stop the storms they have been creating, allowing both the Wavesong and Cadzi and Kherron's row boat to leave the Isle. Cadzi soon falls asleep, but Kherron finds the mainlander ship he spoke about, and persuades the captain Metz to let them on board. He quickly learns that this vessel is hunting merlee for their eggs, and it put to work extracting the eggs from the dead merlee. Rialle, meanwhile, is delighted to find Frenn has stowed away on the Wavesong, and, although she dislikes sea travel, she enjoys meeting the merlee. Briefly, she swims with the merlee and learns what has upset them: they are being hunted and kidnapped by mainlanders. However, she is soon put in danger as the merlee panic at the sight of the hunting vessel Kherron is on. Rialle is saved from drowning by Singer Toharo, but spends the remainder of the voyage unconscious.

Upon arriving in Silvertown, Toharo and Rialle - disguised as an orderly for security - begin to learn that the merlee are being captured on the orders of the Karchlord, a ruler in the mountains, and they must travel there. Kherron, after being attacked by and killing Metz and then discovering the presence of the Wavesong, agrees to travel to the mountains with the hunters, who are Karcholders working for the Karchlord. The Singers first visit Lord Javelly, who is known to be assisting the hunters, where Rialle and Frenn discover quetzal kept in cramped and filthy conditions, a sight which angers Singer Toharo. Rialle is even more appalled when, journeying up into the mountains, she discovers a pool of merlee, frozen to death.

Kherron arrives in the Karchlord's palace, where he meets Lazim - Cadzi's son, who begins to explain the Karchhold to him - and Frazhin, the Khizpriest who can force the truth out of someone with a black khiz spear. Frazhin uses the khiz to test if Kherron is a spy. Kherron then sneaks back to the priest's levels to see what happens to the merlee eggs and discovers the priests injecting them with something which they claim is medicine, but which Kherron suspects is poison. Frazhin then asks Kherron to spy on the newly arrived Singers at a banquet, and he accidentally reveals that Rialle is a Singer. At the banquet, Rialle is shocked to see one of the quetzal from Lord Javelly's palace delivered, to serve the Karchlord as entertainment - quetzal are perfect mimics. That evening, the Singers quickly fall asleep before Singer Toharo can contact the Echorium.

Rialle wakes up drugged in a cage, surrounded by quetzal. Frazhin wants to use the quetzal's mimicking power to steal her Songs and use them to attack the Isle of Echoes. Kherron is tasked with caring for Rialle, as he pretends to despise her, but secretly he promises to help her escape. However, he first asks her to heal the Karchlord Azri, who has stopped eating the priest's poison but is still ill. As soon as she tries, the noise of the quetzal summons the priests and the Challa puts the Karchlord to sleep so he cannot help. Frazhin takes Rialle away, but first she tells Kherron what songs will heal Azri.

As Rialle is led to the Isle of Echoes, becoming increasingly confused as she is repeatedly drugged, Kherron discovers Frenn, who narrowly escaped the avalanche which killed the rest of the Singer delegation and has been left with one arm and leg paralysed. Although the pair initially argue, Frenn is forced to accept that Kherron is now on his side, and Kherron proceeds to heal Azri as instructed so that he can lead a war party after Frazhin. As the war party travels to the coast, they attempt to release the captive quetzal into the forest, but the quetzal, communicating through a reluctant Kherron, insist on coming with the group to rescue the quetzal still in Frazhin's possession.

Rialle wakes up on a boat sailing for the Isle of the Echoes, and asks the merlee to delay their progress with a fog. Frahzin's ships are becalmed, giving Azri's oar-boats time to catch up. A battle begins, and with the help of the merlee and quetzal Azri is soon winning. Frazhin uses his power to push the last remaining boat towards the Isle, and then tries to force Rialle to sing. Fighting against him, she uses Aushan, making it difficult for Azri, Kherron and Frenn to approach and rescue her. When Frazhin's ship begins to sink, he pushes a bound Rialle overboard and tries to escape, only to be attacked viciously by the angry quetzal.

Azri, Kherron and Frenn return to the Isle. Azri makes a peace treaty and swears never to hunt half-creatures again, and Kherron - whom Singer Eliya has been keeping track of through farlistening - is made into a Singer and asks to sing therapy to Frenn to show how he has reformed. The day after the Karcholders leave - all except Lazim, who elects to remain on the Isle - Frenn, Kherron and lazim go down to the beach, where they find Rialle being carried to shore by the merlee. Shortly afterwards, Singer Eliya dies of exhaustion after singing Yehn to several war criminals, including Frazhin and Lord Javelly. After the funeral Eliya shares with Singer Toharo, led by the newly appointed First Singer Graia, Kherron finally apologises to Rialle and, as Frenn begins to regain use of his arm, Rialle realises that the wounds they have suffered will heal over time.

== Characters ==
- Rialle - a gifted Final Year novice in the Echorium, the best student in her class and sensitive to the half-creatures' songs.
- Kherron - a Final Year novice who resents Rialle for her singing ability, and hates The Echorium's regime.
- Frenn - a close friend to Rialle, who becomes a non-singing orderly after his voice breaks, but runs away to join her on the Wavesong. He is badly injured and partially paralysed in an avalanche.
- Frazhin - the Khizpriest, manipulator of the powerful crystal khiz who attempts to destroy The Echorium.
- Lord Azri - the Karchlord, a young man poisoned by his khizpriests using merlee eggs.
- Singer Toharo - Second Singer of The Echorium. He is sent to investigate merlee hunting and to search for the runaway Kherron. He dies in an avalanche in the Karchhold.
- Lazim - a young man in the Karchhold who befriends Kherron and helps him heal the Karchlord.
- Singer Graia - a teacher at The Echorium who later becomes First Singer.
- Singer Eliya - First Singer of The Echorium. She dies of old age at the end of the book.
- Lord Javelly - a noble owning a castle northeast of Silvertown, who helps and supplies the Khizpriest also known as Frazhin.
- Karchlord - the ruler of the Karchhold. He was poisoned by his priest.

== Reception ==
Song Quest received praise from reviewers and won the inaugural Branford Boase Award, given for debut works of children's fiction. In 2001, the critic of children's literature Victor Watson described the novel as a "compelling and at times deeply moving fantasy – slightly strained in places – in which issues of power and cruelty drive a highly imaginative narrative". Roberts' characterisation was praised by reviews from the young adult literature magazine Kliatt as well as the science fiction magazine Vector. Highlighting the development of the protagonist Rialle, Vector found the book emotionally compelling and imaginative, although the reviewer critiqued some clichés found in Robert's prose. In 2003, the journal of the Children's Book Council of Australia remarked on the "quality of imagination and writing" in the book.

The novel was reported as being out-of-print in 2011, but a reprint had been planned in 2012 via the independent publisher Catnip.

== See also ==
- Katherine Roberts
- Crystal Mask
- The Echorium Sequence
