= Spellfall =

2000 novel by Katherine Roberts

- Spellfall hardback front cover Natalie and Jo are riding on a unicorn
- Author: Katherine Roberts
- Cover artist: Paul Young
- Language: English
- Genre: Children's fantasy
- Publisher: The Chicken House
- Publication date: 19 October 2000
- Publication place: United Kingdom
- Media type: Print (hardback and paperback)
- Pages: 239 (first edition, hardcover)
- ISBN: 1-903434-02-5
- OCLC: 44785707
- Preceded by: N/A
- Followed by: N/A

Spellfall is a fantasy novel by English writer Katherine Roberts, published on 19 October 2000 by The Chicken House and aimed at pre-teens.

== Plot introduction ==
The story concerns a 12-year-old girl named Natalie who is kidnapped by a wizard named Hawk who needs her to join his spellclave (group of bonded spellmages) to receive the Power of Thirteen and invade Earthaven (an enchanted realm) to get revenge on the Spell Lords that banished him for breaking a treaty.

== Characters ==
=== Natalie Marlins ===
Natalie "Nat" Marlins is the novel's main character. She has blonde hair and green eyes, wears glasses and is said to be pretty. Her mother, the Spell Lady Atanaqui, died when she was three years old. Natalie's father, a jobless salesman, later marries Natalie's stepmother Julie, who already has a son called Timothy. Natalie and her stepbrother dislike each other. Julie and Tim left London due to the marriage, so that the family live in an English small town whose name is Millennium Green. Natalie's only friend is Jo Carter, the strongest and tallest girl of their school, where Natalie is often teased due to her visual impairment and perceived as crazy because she owns a spider named Itsy. This animal is kidnapped by Hawk and his followers to receive the opportunity to get disposal of Natalie, but the plan is unsuccessful. During the adventure, Natalie makes friends with the coeval Merlin and K'tanaqui, Lady Atanaqui's hound.

=== Merlin ===
Merlin is Hawk's downtrodden son. His mother committed suicide when he still was a baby. Hawk regards Merlin as being completely incompetent as Merlin lacks many magical skills (Hawk chose the name "Merlin" to make fun of him). Merlin is linked with a mouse since he did not manage to get associated to a merlin. He loves computers, a passion his father does not approve of. At the end of the story, Merlin makes his father disappear by transporting in a very successful way. Then Merlin stays in Earthaven to acquaint the Spell Lords with the technology, since a bigger knowledge about computers would help them to understand Oq's system better.

=== Hawk ===
Hawk is the story's villain. The malicious would-be Spell Lord feverishly looks for a person with magical skills he could abduct and whose pet his goshawk could eat, so that the person would join his spellclave as a thirteenth member and make him become a Spell Lord. Hawk has long, black hair, yellow eyes, wears a hawk feather and always carries about with him a cane with a hawk head as its knob.

Hawk caused the death of Merlin's mother by accidentally killing her pet, a sweet little canary. She then took a train to the coast and wandered on a high cliff; her dead body was discovered a few days later on the rocks. Afterwards, Merlin was put by his father into the cellar so that Merlin could not elope.

Hawk eventually gets imprisoned between the worlds by his own son.

=== Jo Carter ===
Joanne "Jo" Carter is Natalie's best and only friend and a member of the school's netball team. They became friends after somebody had stolen Natalie's glasses and been struck down by Jo a few moments later. Jo, the most athletic girl in the school, is extremely big, has brown hair dressed like a fringe and possesses, unlike Natalie, very good eyes. She has a little sister named Sarah, a freckled girl who loves to jabber and annoy Tim.

Jo convinces Natalie to learn inline skating and along with Jo's very fat and drooling dog Bilbo she goes out very early in the morning. During the lesson Natalie loses track of Jo and Bilbo as they disappear inside the fog. A little time later, Natalie is ambushed by Hawk and his followers, who inject Natalie with a tranquiliser to make her fall asleep. Hawk drowns Bilbo in a nearby river. Jo, who cannot free her friend, alerts Natalie's and her own family.

During the residual course of the story, Jo and Tim become friends, too. In the end, Jo and her sister are offered a new dog.

=== Mr Marlins ===
Mr Marlins – first name unrevealed – is Natalie's father. He drinks much beer and is constantly intoxicated. He used to work as a salesman until he lost his job, so that he always stays at home and mainly spends his time cleaning his prestigious car, which he had not been driving any more since the death of Natalie's mother. There are quite few people whom Mr Marlins has a good relationship to, a fact which will have changed by the end of the tale.

=== Julie Marlins ===
Julie Marlins is Natalie's stepmother, Mr Marlin's wife and Tim's mother. As she told her son before marrying Mr Marlins, she regards Natalie as a confused little girl and her father as being an unhappy man. Because of this attitude, she mothers Natalie inordinately, by which she neglects her son. The latter fact led to the hostility that rose between Natalie and Tim, whereby Tim behaves more aggressively and teasingly.

=== Tim ===
Timothy Lockley, "Tim" for short, is the stepbrother of Natalie and the son of Julie. He is angry with his mother's second marriage, which forced them to leave London and move to Millennium Green. Tim also detests Natalie and her father, making them responsible for his anger and terrorising his stepsister to get rid of his aggressiveness. He has made friends with a gang composed of some of his classmates; to enter that group he had to pierce his ear with an earring that looks like a skull. Tim is described to have blonde curls.

== Reception ==
The majority of reviews were positive, for example the Sunday Times said the novel was "Involving and suspenseful," and the Voice of Young Advocates "highly recommended" it.

Other positive comments came from Jean Ure who said Spellfall was, "A spellbinder! I raced enchanted through every twist and turn.", The Observer who said "A welcome and well-written addition to the sorcery genre," and the Gary Dalkin, British Science Fiction Association, who said, "...keeps the adventure, twists, turns and thrills coming at a breathless pace."

Negative points were brought up by Goodtoread.org who commented that, "You're never sure just how incompetent any of the magical characters really are, and you never really feel for any of them except Merlin. You're not sure just how seriously you're supposed to take the magical aspects of the story."
