= Characters in The Echorium Sequence =

Characters in book series by Katherine Roberts

This is a list of characters in The Echorium Sequence books by Katherine Roberts.

== Major characters ==
=== Frazhin ===
Frazhin is a significant character in Song Quest, Crystal Mask, and Dark Quetzal. The series's main antagonist, Frazhin, repeatedly attempts to destroy the Echorium with the power of khiz crystal,khiz crystal which he appears to have a special bond to. In Song Quest, Frazhin is the khizpriest of the Karch and is poisoning the Karchlord Azri to limit his power. He uses a spear made of khiz crystal to force people to tell the truth. He kidnaps Rialle and uses the quetzal's mimicking abilities to attack the Isle with her Songs. At the end of the book, he is presumed to be killed by a wild quetzal.

In Crystal Mask, Frazhin, severely disfigured by the quetzal attack, attempts to build a palace out of khiz crystal. He is assisted by Lady Yashra, his pregnant lover, and her tribe of Harai horselords, controlled by the khiz. He enslaves young centaurs to mine the khiz for him and bewitches street children with the khiz to obey him. Capturing Kherron, Frazhin threatens to harm Renn – whom he believes is Kherron's son – unless Kherron teaches the children Echorium songs. When the Khizalace is destroyed, Frazhin flees to the lake, abandoning Yashra.

In Dark Quetzal, Frazhin, now styling himself as a Starmaker, has enslaved many Half Creatures using the khiz who worship him as a god. He kidnaps Rialle and drugs her to reveal information about Yashra and his daughter Kyarra, whom he has kidnapped. He plans to use the quetzal memoryplace to change history and destroy the Singers, assisted by Kyarra. He successfully enters the Memory Trance but is stalled by the discovery that he was born in the Echorium to a Singer father and a Forest people mother, raised there until it was realized he was resistant to the Songs; at some point, he was made to forget his training and was sent away. This confuses him long enough for the Singers to open the crystal Fane he was trapped in.

Although Frazhin's crystal-fused body resists the Yehn sung to him, he is then shot with a poisoned arrow by Night Plume, stabbed by Jilian, and finished off by angry Horselords and Karchholders.

=== Singer Kherron ===
Appears as a significant character in Song Quest, Crystal Mask, and Dark Quetzal.

In Song Quest, Kherron is a hot-headed novice who resents the restrictive life of The Echorium, although he still aspires to become a Singer. He is jealous of Rialle's singing ability and is considered a bully by his classmates. He runs away from the Isle with the help of Cadzi and the merlee hunters, and makes his way to the Karch. During the journey, he has a nasty encounter with Metz, which ends in the man's death. Kherron accidentally betrays Rialle to Frazhin but then helps heal the Karchlord Azri and leads the rescue party, which leaves the Echorium. On the journey to the Echorium, he discovers he can talk to Quetzal and enlists their help. At the end of the book, he is named a Singer and helps to sing Challa to Frenn.

In Crystal Mask, Kherron is the Second Singer of The Echorium and is renowned for a fierce temper. He never believed Frazhin died in Song Quest and still harbors a grudge. He travels to the mainland with Shaiala and Renn and tracks Shaiala through her crystal when she runs away, occasionally assisted by Renn. He is shown to have maintained his friendship with Lazim and, to a lesser extent, with Frenn, and he comes to respect Renn's promise as a Singer. In the Pass of Silence, he is captured by Frazhin's men, and a khiz crystal is placed in his throat, which destroys his ability to sing. Near the end of the book, Kherron reveals that he may be Renn's father, explaining his unusual pride in Renn's abilities, but he maintains that Frenn seems a more likely candidate.

In Dark Quetzal, Kherron is a resentful ex-Second Singer whose voice has not yet healed. He is very short-tempered with most people, but he listens to Renn's advice and seems to be quite close to him. He is deeply suspicious of Dark Plume when he first arrives and is very focused on his grudge against Frazhin, although he is distracted by the suggestion of a cure for his voice. By the end of the book, his voice is healed, although he does not return to his post as Second Singer.

=== Singer Rialle ===
Appears as a significant character in Song Quest and as a minor character in Crystal Mask and Dark Quetzal. Rialle is introduced as a gifted novice who can hear the merlee, a close friend of Frenn and Chissar but envied by Kherron. She is shocked by the cruelty to Half Creatures and helps the Singers stop merlee hunting. However, she is captured by Frazhin and held in a cage for months before being drugged and taken to the Isle, where she sings to Azri. She gradually loses her grip on reality, but continues to resist Frazhin and is rescued by the merlee when she falls overboard. Her injuries are healed on the Pentangle and she becomes a Singer shortly after the book's end.

In Crystal Mask, Rialle appears briefly as Renn's mother and someone who empathizes with Shaiala. She has maintained her ability to talk to Merlee and lives in a cave on the coast so she can be close to them. She suffers from extreme claustrophobia after her imprisonment and cannot live in The Echorium. She also no longer sings on the Pentangle. It is suggested she had a long relationship with Frenn, despite his status as an orderly, although she also slept with Kherron to fulfill her duty to The Echorium.

In Dark Quetzal, Rialle is captured by Frazhin and drugged for information. Although she cannot help but confess, she uses her Songs to free Night Plume and then asks him to fly to the Isle and fetch help. She is freed as Frazhin's temple collapses, and at the end of the book, she moves to a mainland cave so she can be close to Kyarra.

=== Frenn ===
Appears as a major character in Song Quest and as a minor character in Crystal Mask. In Song Quest, he is a novice and a close friend of Rialle's who is rejected as a Singer. He runs away from orderly training to travel with her. He is nearly killed in the avalanche which destroys the rest of the Singer party, and is left paralysed down one side of his body. In spite of this, he travels with the karchlord's war party, although he maintains his distrust of Kherron. At the end of the book, he returns to orderly training partially healed by the Echorium Songs, although he still walks with a limp. In Crystal Mask, Frenn is part of the pentad protecting Kherron, Renn and Shaiala. He is killed in the Pass of Silence protecting Renn, and is later revealed to be Rialle's lover and probably Renn's father.

=== Singer Renn ===
Appears as a major character in Crystal Mask and Dark Quetzal. In Crystal Mask, he is an Eighth Year novice who has been able to hear Half Creatures for years, but hides this ability for fear of being thought crazy. He is often bullied by his classmates for his small stature and unusually good singing ability. He is initially very selfish, refusing to help Shaiala and rejecting Rialle out of fear of being thought different. He is often very antagonistic towards Shaiala, as he resents her for revealing his ability to hear Half Creatures.

In the Pass of Silence, Renn accidentally causes an avalanche which is fatal to Frenn, making him feel very guilty. However, he manages to save the other orderlies from being crushed, and then helps to attack the Khizalace. Although he is captured by Yashra, he refuses to co-operate and finds a way to escape. At the end of the book he joins forces with Shaiala to help defeat Frazhin and win her herdstone, reconciling their previous differences. He also develops a close relationship with Kherron, who may be his father, and he reconciles with Rialle and the merlee at the end of the book.

In Dark Quetzal, Renn as the newly appointed Second Singer is sent to recover the kidnapped Kyarra. He shows himself to be very open and trusting of Night Plume when he first arrives, and is suggested to have maintained his friendship with Shaiala.

=== Shaiala ===
Appears as a major character in Crystal Mask and Dark Quetzal. She was adopted by centaurs from a young age and considers herself part of the group, appearing wild to other humans, who she finds it hard to trust and often injures with powerful centaur kicks. She can initially only speak centaur language and must be translated for by Renn, but she learns gradually human speech. Before the beginning of the book she has her memories wiped by Yashra's crystal mask, and can only remember the night she was captured and the rest of the herd's foals enslaved. She is sent to The Echorium for treatment, where she begins to trust the Singers. She is hot tempered and often argues with Renn.

When the Wavesong reaches the Mainland, she runs away and tries to find the centaurs but is kidnapped again by Yashra, who Shaiala remembers from her capture and immediately hates. In captivity, she befriends Erihan and the other street children. With Erihan's help, she escapes and finds the centaur herd, who give her the herdstones needed to free the captured foals. At the end of the book, she joins forces with Renn to defeat Frazhin and find her own herdstone, allowing her to join the centaur tribe, but she instead decides to accept her human side and join the Kaleri, Erihan's tribe.

In Dark Quetzal, Shaiala is married to Erihan, although she is still friends with the centaur herd and carried her herdstone. She follows Kyarra as she runs away from the Horselord camp because she feels guilty for kicking Yashra's stomach when she was pregnant. She also fights with the centaurs to destroy Frazhin's temple.

=== Erihan ===
Appears as a major character in Crystal Mask and as a minor character Dark Quetzal. Erihan is the favourite son of Lord Nahar of the Kaleri tribe of Horselords. In Crystal Mask, he travels to Rivermeet to try to find his missing mother, but is mistaken for a street child and captured by Lady Yashra's men. In captivity, he befriends Shaiala, although he is sceptical of her claims of centaurs. They escape together and find the centaur herd as Erihan is searching for the Kaleri, and together they rescue the captured children. At the end of the book, his mother returns and Shaiala joins the Kaleri. In Dark Quetzal, he is married to Shaiala, and takes over leadership of the tribe when his father abdicates, leading the attack on Frazhin's temple.

=== Yashra ===
Appears as a major character in Crystal Mask and Dark Quetzal. In Crystal Mask, she is Frazhin's lover who assists him with building the Khizalace, enslaving centaurs and kidnapping street children. She is also leader of the Harai tribe of Horselords, who she commands to help Frazhin. She often travels out into the world where Frazhin cannot because of his disability, and at these times she stays in contact with him through a khiz crystal mask. She loves Frazhin, and hates the Echorium for leaving him so badly injured. As the leader of the Harai tribe of Horselords, she holds the title 'Lady Yashra', but she also calls herself 'Aunt Yashra' to win over kidnapped street children. At the time of this book, she is pregnant with Frazhin's child, and when captured she chooses to suffer Yehn and save her child rather than be executed.

In Dark Quetzal, Yashra has been left in a vegetative state by the Yehn and is only capable of following simple orders. In spite of this, Kyarra forms a close bond with her when they are both kidnapped, and her desire to cure her mother becomes a major motivating factor. When she is captured, the Harai agree to care for Yashra as penance for obeying her orders in Crystal Mask. At the end of the book, she has been cured by the Forest People's potions, and has resolved to live a better life and care for her daughter, who has only just recovered from Yehn. She has rejoined the Harai, and wishes to stay close to Kyarra.

=== Kyarra ===
Appears as a major character in Dark Quetzal. Kyarra is the daughter of Yashra and Frazhin, who has been raised in the Echorium as a Singer child and shows great promise. At the time of Dark Quetzal she is eleven years old and is taking her Final Year early, when she learns that her mother is "ill" and wants to see her. She sneaks out of the Echorium with her friend Caell and is shocked to see Yashra in a vegetative state. Although she initially refuses to believe that her parents are not Singers, Kyarra comes to care greatly for Yashra when they are both kidnapped on Frazhin's orders, and wishes to cure her. She also befriends Jilian, daughter of the pirate who has kidnapped her.

Kyarra cares deeply for her friends, and risks a great deal to help Jilian and her mother, eventually travelling to Frazhin's temple and entering the Memory Trance with him in the hopes of curing her mother's condition. Kyarra receives Yehn while in the Fane, and does not wake for five years, in which time Yashra is healed and resolves to care for her daughter. At the end of Dark Quetzal, Kyarra wishes to pursue her joint heritage as a Singer and as a Harai princess, and hopes to later become the first female Second Singer.

=== Caell ===
Appears as a major character in Dark Quetzal. Caell is Kyarra's close friend in the Echorium, who discovers he can talk to merlee and passes on the message from them that her mother is ill. When this results in Kyarra's kidnapping and his own near-drowning by Frazhin's merlee, he feels very guilty for the pain he caused her, and she in return believes he is dead. He travels with Renn and Kherron to the Mainland to search for her, and on the journey becomes close friends with Night Plume, who he sees as a reformed character in spite of Renn and Kherron's misgivings. At the end of the novel, he is horrified when he must help sing Yehn to Kyarra in order to save her life, and is waiting on the mainland when she later recovers.

=== Night Plume ===
Appears as a major character in Dark Quetzal. Night Plume is a dark coloured quetzal, born to Frazhin's flock and raised under the control of the khiz. He is the leader of the flock of fledglings when he is brought to see Rialle, who uses her Songs to free his mind and ask him to fly to the Isle for help. When sent to retrieve Kyarra and Yashra, Night Plume seizes his chance and reaches the Wavesong, where he makes contact with Caell.

Although he is viewed with suspicion by the Singers, particularly Kherron, Night Plume fully rejects Frazhin and tries his hardest to help the Singers retrieve Rialle and Kyarra and defeat Frazhin once and for all. This decision causes him much pain, as his close friend Sky Swooper is killed for his disobedience, and the rest of his flock, led by his friend Sun Glimmer, reject him. At the end of the book, Night Plume helps to free Frazhin's quetzal using wild speech, and then shoots Frazhin with a poisoned arrow in an attempt to kill him.

=== Jilian ===
Appears as a major character in Dark Quetzal. Jilian is the daughter of a famous pirate, Asil, and she helps him to kidnap Kyarra, acting as Kyarra and Yashra's guard on the journey. She is very hot-tempered and boasts about her fighting prowess, but she gradually befriends Kyarra. When Kyarra is captured, Jilian is too, and the Horselords plan to use her as bait for her father. Kyarra helps her to escape. At the end of the book, Jilian stabs Frazhin to prevent him from harming Kyarra, leading the attack which kills him. She then convinces her father to give up piracy, and is waiting for Kyarra when she wakes up.

== Minor characters ==
=== Recurring characters ===
- Singer Graia - Appears as a minor character in Song Quest, Crystal Mask and Dark Quetzal. At the beginning of Song Quest, she is a teacher at The Echorium who teaches Rialle and Kherron's class. At the end of the book, she is named First Singer, and remains at this post throughout the series.
- Lord Azri - Appears as a minor character in Song Quest and Dark Quetzal. In Song Quest, he was the young karchlord who was believed to be behind the hunting of merlee, but Kherron discovered he was being controlled by Frazhin using poisoned merlee eggs. Rialle attempted to heal him, but failed, and instead Kherron sang to him, healing his seizures. He then led a war party to stop Frazhin from destroying the Echorium, and forged a new treaty with the Singers. In Dark Quetzal, he and his men join forces with the Horselords to take revenge on Frazhin and destroy him once and for all.
- Lazim - Appears as a minor character in Song Quest, Crystal Mask and Dark Quetzal. Lazim is Cadzi's son and was raised in the karchhold, where he developed a close bond with horses. He befriends Kherron upon his arrival in the Karch, and helps him heal Azri. At the end of the book, he joins the Echorium as an orderly, and in each subsequent book he appears as an orderly travelling with the Singer delegation. He remains close friends with Kherron.
- Lord Nahar - Appears as a minor character in Crystal Mask and Dark Quetzal. Lord Nahar is Erihan's father, and leader of the Kaleri tribe of Horselords until he abdicates in Erihan's favour during the events of Dark Quetzal. He is strongly protective of his son, and is respected by all Horselord tribes. He occasionally calls tribal meetings in order to discuss recent events, and in Crystal Mask he leads the Horselord army in their attack on the Khizalace.
- Rafiz Longshadow - Appears as a minor character in Crystal Mask and Dark Quetzal. Rafiz Longshadow is a dark-coated centaur who is close friends with Shaiala Two Hoof and Kamara Silvermane. In Crystal Mask, he is kidnapped with the other foals and forced to mine khiz for Frazhin until Shaiala brings him a herdstone to help him turn invisible. He maintains close links with Shaiala after she leaves the herd, and helps her to capture Kyarra and Jilian in Dark Quetzal, later tracking the girls when they are taken by the forest people, and finally joining the attack on Frazhin's temple.
- Kamara Silvermane - Appears as a minor character in Crystal Mask and Dark Quetzal. Kamara Silvermane is an unusually pale-coated centaur foal who is close friends with Shaiala Two Hoof and Rafiz Longshadow. She is the first to be kidnapped by the Harai because of her bright coat, and she works in the khiz mines for Frazhin with the other foals. When Shaiala brings herdstones, Kamara leads the female foals in the most coordinated attack on the Khizalace, rescuing the more headstrong male foals. Kamara maintains close links with Shaiala after she leaves the herd, and helps her to capture Kyarra and Jilian in Dark Quetzal, later tracking the girls when they are taken by the forest people, and finally joining the attack on Frazhin's temple.

=== Characters appearing only in Song Quest ===
- Singer Toharo - Second Singer of The Echorium. He leads the party sent to investigate merlee hunting and to search for the runaway Kherron. He dies in an avalanche in the Karchhold with the rest of the Singer delegation.
- Singer Eliya - First Singer of The Echorium. She is very old at the time of the book, and eventually dies of exhaustion after singing Yehn to Frazhin.
- Lord Javelly - A noble owning a castle northeast of Silvertown, who helps Frazhin's merlee hunters. He is sung Yehn at the end of the book for breaching the Half Creature treaty.
- Chissar - A friend of Rialle and Frenn's who is in their class at the Echorium. He distrusts Kherron, and remains hostile towards him at the end of the book.
- Gilli - A classmate of Rialle, Frenn and Kherron. She is overweight and struggles with breath control, and is sent to orderly training at the same time as Frenn.
- Cadzi - A Karchholder and one of the merlee hunters who helps Kherron escape the Isle. Lazim's father.
- Metz - The captain of the merlee hunting ship, he distrusts Kherron and is killed when he attacks Kherron, although it is unclear whether his death is accidental or caused by Kherron.

=== Characters appearing only in Crystal Mask ===
- Imara - A young street child kidnapped by Yashra who is taken to the Khizalace. She is Laphie's younger sister.
- Laphie - A street child captured by Yashra and taken to the Khizalace. She is Imara's older sister.
- Teggi - A cocky street child who is rejected by Yashra and helps Shaiala and Erihan to organise an escape.
- Alaira - An Echorium classmate of Renn's who bullies him for being able to hear Merlee. Friends with Geran.
- Geran - An Echorium classmate of Renn's who bullies him for being able to hear Merlee. Friends with Alaira.
- Ollaron - An old history teacher at the Echorium. Although mentioned in both Song Quest and Dark Quetzal as a teacher, he only appears in Crystal Mask.
- The Pentad - The group of five orderlies protecting the Singer delegation. Although a Pentad is the usual form for protective orderlies, and many appear in the series, the Pentad in Crystal Mask is the only one where all the members are named: Frenn, Lazim, Anyan, Verris, and Durall. Of these five, Frenn and Durall die in an ambush in the Pass of Silence.

=== Characters appearing only in Dark Quetzal ===
- Xiancotl - Holy man of the forest people, who enters the quetzal memoryplace in order to predict the future.
- Speaks Many Tongues - Translator for the forest people, who tells the Horselords of Xiancotl's prophecy, causing panic. He later brings Kyarra, Jilian, and Shaiala to Xiancotl to join the Memory Trance.
- Hunts Like a Spider - Speaks Many Tongues' son, who travels with him and later tracks Shaiala, Kyarra, and Jilian when they escape the forest people.
- Lord Zorahan - Leader of the Harai tribe. He offers to care for Lady Yashra in penance for obeying her orders in the Sunless Valley.
- Asil - Jilian's father, the leader of the pirates who kidnaps Kyarra. He and all his crew wear khiz crystal stars to resist Songs. He later stops his piracy because of Jilian's requests.
- Blackbeard - One of Asil's crew. He attacks a helpless Yashra on the ship and is sung Shi by Kyarra as punishment, leading the other pirates to respect her Songs more.
- Lianne - A novice at the Echorium who bullies Kyarra. She later feels guilty and helps with Kyarra's treatment for Yehn.
- Sky Swooper - One of Frazhin's quetzal, a close friend of Night Plume. She is killed for his disobedience.
- Sun Glimmer - One of Frazhin's quetzal and Night Plume's second-in-command. He takes over the flock, rejecting Night Plume for leaving Frazhin, but is convinced Night Plume is right by Wild Speech during the Memory Trance.

== See also ==
- Isle of Echoes
- Katherine Roberts
- Renn, Craig Cody's girlfriend and cocaine dealer in Animal Kingdom (TV series)
- The Echorium
- The Echorium Sequence
  - Book 1: Song Quest (1999) by Katherine Roberts
  - Book 2: Crystal Mask (2001) by Katherine Roberts
  - Book 3: Dark Quetzal (2003) by Katherine Roberts
