= Ren (given name) =

Ren is a given name, most often Japanese.

== People ==
=== Single name ===
- Ren (British musician), aka Ren Gill, Welsh-born, UK-based musician
- Ren (South Korean singer), member of South Korean boy band NU'EST
- Renforshort, Canadian singer formerly known as Ren

=== Given name ===
- Ren Yano (矢野 仁), Japanese traditional calligrapher
- Ren Dokyu (道休 蓮; born 2008), Japanese model
- Shōji Ren (庄司 廉; 1887-1960), Japanese businessman
- Ren Osugi (大杉 漣; 1951–2018), Japanese actor
- Ren Sato (politician) (佐藤 錬; born 1951), Japanese politician
- Ren Sengoku (仙石 廉; born 1990), Japanese football player
- Ren Ozawa (小澤 廉; born 1991), Japanese actor
- Ren Kazahari (風張 蓮; born 1993), Japanese baseball pitcher
- Ren Wada (和田 恋; born 1995), Japanese baseball player
- Ren Ikeda (池田 廉; born 1997), Japanese footballer
- Ren Kawashiri (川尻 蓮; born 1997), Japanese singer and member of JO1
- Ren Yamamoto (footballer, born 1997) (山本 蓮}; born 1997), Japanese footballer
- Ren Meguro (目黒 蓮; born 1997), Japanese singer, actor, and member of Snow Man
- Ren Narita (成田 蓮; born 1997), Japanese wrestler
- Ren Hiramoto (平本 蓮; born 1998), Japanese mixed martial artist
- Ren Omagari (大曲 錬; born 1998), Japanese baseball player
- Ren Yamamoto (footballer, born 1999) (山本 廉}; born 1999), Japanese footballer
- Ren Nagase (永瀬廉; born 1999), Japanese singer, actor, and member of King & Prince
- Ren Kato (加藤 蓮; born 1999), Japanese footballer
- Ren Fujimura (藤村 怜; born 1999), Japanese football player
- Ren Sato (racing driver) (佐藤 蓮; born 2001), Japanese racing driver
- Ren Wyld (fl. 2020s), Australian author

== Fictional characters ==
=== Single name ===
- Ren, the titular heroine from the fantasy webseries Ren: The Girl with the Mark from Mythica Entertainment and Kate Madison
- Ren (Tsukihime), a character from the game Kagetsu Tohya and Melty Blood: Re-ACT
- Ren, son of Primus, protagonist of the animated series The Pirates of Dark Water
- Ren (Star Wars) (not to be confused with Kylo Ren), a character in the Star Wars franchise

=== Given name ===
- Ren Akiyama, a character in the tokusatsu series Kamen Rider Ryuki
- Ren Amamiya, the name used for Joker, the main protagonist, in the anime adaptation of Persona 5
- Ren Ashbell, an alias used by the protagonist of Bladedance of Elementalers, Kamito Kazehaya
- Ren Gottlieb, a character from the Australian soap Neighbours
- Ren Höek, a chihuahua from the Nickelodeon animated series The Ren & Stimpy Show
- Ren Honjo, a character from the manga, anime, and film NANA
- Ren Mihashi, main character from the manga, anime and game from Big Windup!
- Ren Jinguuji, a character from the anime, game and manga from Uta no Prince-sama
- Ren Karas, a character from the anime and manga Element Hunters
- Ren Krawler, the Darkus protagonist from the animated series Bakugan: Gundalian Invaders
- Ren, a character from the game and anime "DRAMAtical Murder"
- Ren, a character from the video game Oxenfree
- Renn Kousaka, main character from the 2008 Japanese tokusatsu television series, Go-ongers
- Ren Maka, a character from the anime Chibi Vampire
- Ren McCormack, the main character from the film Footloose
- Ren Ren Ren Nagusaran Renshia Rurunnren Nakora, heroine of DearS
- Ren Senjyu, a character from Ultraman Nexus
- Ren Sohma, the mother of Akito Sohma in the manga Fruits Basket
- Ren Stevens, a character from Even Stevens
- Ren Tsuruga, character in the manga Skip Beat
- Tao Len, sometimes romanized as Tao Ren, a character in Shaman King
- Ren Suzugamori, a character in the anime series Cardfight!! Vanguard
- Ren Hiyama, a character in the game and anime series Little Battlers Experience
- Ren Hazuki, a character in the anime series Love Live! Superstar!!
- Ren Nanahoshi, a character in the media franchise From Argonavis
- Ren Shiranami, a character in the supernatural mobile game Tokyo Debunker
- Ren Hana, a character in the Boyfriend to Death video game series

== See also ==
- Ren (surname)
- Ren (disambiguation)
