= The Seven Fabulous Wonders =

Novel series by Katherine Roberts

The Seven Fabulous Wonders is a fantasy series by Katherine Roberts currently comprising seven novels based on the Seven Wonders of the Ancient World: The Great Pyramid Robbery (2001), The Babylon Game (2002), The Amazon Temple Quest (2002), The Mausoleum Murder (2003), The Olympic Conspiracy (2004), The Colossus Crisis (2005), and The Cleopatra Curse (2006).

== The Great Pyramid Robbery (2001) ==
First edition cover of The Great Pyramid Robbery

The Great Pyramid Robbery was published 3 September 2001, and is a prequel to The Babylon Game.

The novel is about a young hemutiu called Senu and his ghostly double Red. Senu is usually the class clown and uses his Ka for playing practical jokes on his family. When Senu and a group of his friends play a dare in the hemutiu tombs, the dare goes horribly wrong when Senu and his Ka make contact with the Ka's of the dead. Senu is frightened, and runs out of the tomb before he finds out what he had done. Senu's Heka gets the attention of the Imakhu captain Nemhab. Nemheb then sends Senu to the Mertu gang the Scorpions, building Lord Khafre's pyramid. Senu is then helplessly tangled in a struggle for the two lands. After Senu battles Nemheb's Ka when trying to free red he became the Sem-Priest.

== The Babylon Game (2002) ==
First edition cover of The Babylon Game

The Babylon Game was published 4 March 2002.

The novel is set in 539 BC; inside the city of Babylon, known as the Gateway of God, is Tia, the adopted daughter of a perfume maker. She is picking herbs in the sacred Amytis garden. Next to the garden is a portion of the double defense wall surrounding the city. Tia soon discovered what is between the two walls; Sirrush, otherwise known as dragons.

Fearing for the dragon's health, she leaves them food. A touch from the dragons grants Tia great magical powers, enough to threaten or save Babylon. These will be needed, as far in the plains the Persian king Cyrus the Great, plans to capture Babylon. The secret of its salvation might just lie in the hanging gardens themselves.

== The Amazon Temple Quest (2002) ==
First edition cover of The Amazon Temple Quest

The Amazon Temple Quest was published 2 December 2002.

In the novel, Lysippe, an Amazon princess, is suffering. Her tribe has vanished and her sister has been badly wounded. The Gryphon Stone can help, but the evil Alchemist, who has taken Lysippe as his slave, is after it also. With the help of her friend Hero, who has also been enslaved, they seek sanctuary in the Temple of Artemis. There, Lysippe makes new friends and enemies. While her sister Tanis is being healed, Lysippe stays in the temple, but she sometimes ventures out resulting in finding a nymph named Smyrna. As Smyrna instructs Lysippe in Amazon ways, Lysippe is formulating a plan to rid of the Alchemist and finally be free again.

== The Mausoleum Murder (2003) ==
First edition cover of The Mausoleum Murder

The Mausoleum Murder was published 1 December 2003.

In the beginning of the story, Alexis' home Halicarnassos is at war with Macedon. As the war rages on Alexis' stepmother still wants to make the pilgrimage to the river. Alexis has the gift to turn statues that have enough gold on them into real people. This gift gets him into trouble as his stepmother has the spirit of the old king who wants to reclaim his land. Alexis meets the princess and turns her fabled chimera to life and it rampages through the city attacking all who are known as their enemies. Alexis then goes to the river and reverses his gift and is shocked when his father and his best friend are still real when all of the other statues have turned back to stone.

== The Olympic Conspiracy (2004) ==
First edition cover of The Olympic Conspiracy

The Olympic Conspiracy was published 17 September 2004.

=== Plot summary ===
The story is about the young Sosi. Sosi has a curse, that makes him half-snake. At each full moon, he is able to "shed his skin" and adopt the look of anyone he wants. When his brother, Theron, is injured, Sosi uses his curse to take his place in the Olympic games so that Theron won't be disqualified. Although his brother Theron is nasty to him, Sosi wants to find out about his curse at Olympia, and redeem himself in his family's eyes.

However, Sosi uncovers a terrorist plot at the Games. Boys competing in the Games, the favourites to win (including Theron), are all being targeted by the mysterious Warriors of Ahriman. Sosi soon discovers that the Warriors are targeting those that are sent dreams by the goddess of victory, Nike, who has manifested herself in the form of a priestess to oversee the Games.

When the priestess reveals herself, it is up to Sosi and his friends to make sure that the ones who she sent victory dreams win their events. However, when three out of the four she picked lose, she becomes extremely weak. The Warrior of Ahriman reveals his plan to sacrifice Nike to arise an army from the dead, Sosi has to embrace his curse. He turns into a snake, and calls Zeus to bring his thunderbolt down on the Warrior, just like his past incarnation, Sosipolis, did 36 years ago.

When the Warrior is defeated, fears arise that Soksi will go to the same fate as Sosipolis and be unable to change back from a snake. However, when Theron admits to everyone how much he loves his little brother (when Sosi's own mother cannot bring herself to) Sosi transforms back into his human self.

=== Characters ===
- Sosi, a snake-demon reincarnated as a Macadion. He takes his brother's place in the boy's game looking like Theon. He too is in danger.
- Theron, Soksi's brother who can't compete in the boys' games because of a javelin accident. He helps Soksi to turn back into his real form.
- Lady Alcmena, Soksi and Theron's mother who whipped Soki for shedding his skin. She is in danger when Soki comes.
- Pericles, an opponent in the Games. Also a friend. Doesn't believe Soksi-Theon's story about Soki being a snake-demon and does until the real Theon shows up. Thinks everything that happens is Rasim's fault.
- Ereitaia, Pericles' sister also the love interest of Theon. Also friend of priestess Nike
- Priestess Nike, like Soksi is a demon-child but can turn into an eagle. She has connections to humans and gets weak if her chosen favorites don't win.
- Rasim, a Persian slave who gets blamed for the terrorists. He was with three others when something happened.

== The Colossus Crisis (2005) ==
The Colossus Crisis was published 21 October 2005.

== The Cleopatra Curse (2006) ==
The Cleopatra Curse was published 3 July 2006.
