= The Echorium Sequence =

Fantasy books by Katherine Roberts

The Echorium Sequence is a fictional young adult fantasy trilogy by Katherine Roberts. The trilogy comprises Song Quest (1999), Crystal Mask (2001), and Dark Quetzal (2003) and follows the tales of The Echorium - the singers located on the Isle of Echoes. In the first book, Song Quest, the major characters are singer Rialle, and Kherron. Song Quest is followed by Crystal Mask, which focuses on singers Renn and Shaiala. Dark Quetzal, the third instalment, stars Kyarra and Caell. The trilogy follows each generation carrying on from the previous generation in each book, starting with Rialle and Kherron. The series features mythical creatures such as nāgas, centaurs, and half-creatures.

== Awards ==
Song Quest - Winner of the Branford Boase Award for 2000.

== Plot summary ==
=== Song Quest ===
In Song Quest, Rialle, a novice Singer, is asked to travel to the mainland in order to stop the hunting of Merlee and other Half Creatures, and her friend Frenn leaves orderly training to join her. As she leaves, another novice, Kherron, runs away from the Isle with the help of the merlee hunters. They discover Frazhin controlling the Karchlord with poisoned merlee eggs and keeping the other inhabitants under control using khiz ures to stop him.

=== Crystal Mask ===
Set 20 years after Song Quest, Crystal Mask introduces Rialle's son Renn as a novice at the Echorium, who must travel overseas when the arrival of Shaiala, a wild girl who claims to have been raised by centaurs, casts doubt on the long-held belief that Frazhin is dead. Between them, they discover that Frazhin, with the help of his lover Yashra, has been kidnapping children and enslaving Half Creatures in an attempt to build a khiz palace of the Songs to rival the Echorium. By combining Renn's songs with Shaiala's centaur kicks, the khiz is defeated and Yashra captured, although Frazhin disappears, presumed drowned.

=== Dark Quetzal ===
Eleven years after Crystal Mask, Kyarra, a gifted young novice, is horrified to learn from her friend Caell's discussion with the merlee that her parents were not Singers, and she falls into a trap and is kidnapped. Meanwhile, Night Plume, a dark-coloured quetzal under Frazhin's control, suddenly finds himself free after being sung to by a captured Rialle. He fetches the Singers to help while Kyarra struggles with her new identity as Frazhin and Yashra's daughter, and all the while, Frazhin grows closer to eradicating Singers forever using the quetzal Memoryplace. The characters from the series come together to stop him, and eventually, the world is put right, Frazhin is killed, and the Half Creatures are freed.

== Characters ==
- Frazhin - uses khiz crystals to manipulate humans and half-creatures. The main antagonist of the series. Features in Song Quest, Crystal Mask and Dark Quetzal.
- Singer Kherron - becomes the Second Singer of The Echorium in Crystal Mask. Features in Song Quest, Crystal Mask and Dark Quetzal.
- Singer Rialle - mother of Renn, sensitive to the songs of half-creatures, particularly merlee. Features in Song Quest, Crystal Mask, and Dark Quetzal.
- Singer Renn - son of singer Rialle. As a novice, he is able to understand half-creature speech. He features in Crystal Mask and Dark Quetzal.
- Shaiala - human child brought up by centaurs and later adopted by the Kaleri. Features in Crystal Mask and Dark Quetzal.
- Erihan - son of Horse Lord Nahar. Features in Crystal Mask and Dark Quetzal.
- Lady Yashra - mother of Kyarra. Features in Crystal Mask and Dark Quetzal.
- Singer Kyarra - Frazhin's daughter, raised on the Isle of Echoes as a novice. She features in Dark Quetzal.
- Night Plume - is a Quetzal, half-man and half-bird corrupted by Frazhin's use of the khiz crystal. Features in Dark Quetzal.

== Magic ==
Many different forms of magic are used within the series and are not always referred to as such. However, the supernatural occurrence can be roughly divided into three parts: Songs, Half Creatures, and Stones of Power.

=== Songs ===
Singers use the Songs of Power to manipulate, heal and punish those around them. There are five Songs, which are listed in The Echorium Anthem at the start of each book:

- Challa - The dream song, often used to calm people or produce healing sleep. It is considered the easiest Song to learn, and the least harmful.
- Kashe - The laughter song, used to waken people or heal through mirth.
- Shi - The crying song, used to force people to confront pain and heal through tears.
- Aushan - The fear song, used to bring hidden fears to life and punish misbehavior. The most dangerous song commonly used.
- Yehn - The death song, used to close doors in the head. In mild cases, causes people to forget, and in severe ones can create a form of 'living death'. The most dangerous of the Songs, and one only used very occasionally.

The Songs are amplified through certain materials, including bluestone, khiz and water, and have the most effect when sung to a relaxed individual by five Singers on the corners of a Pentangle. In addition to each Song's individual properties, they can all be used to contact Half Creatures and communicate over distance with bluestones. The Singers have other magical abilities related to the Songs, including listening over great distances and listening to determine if someone is lying to them.

=== Half Creatures ===
Half Creatures are half-human, half-animal sentient beings living in secluded areas of the world. All Half Creatures are protected under treaty from being hunted or enslaved, and while not all can speak aloud, they can communicate using Wild Speech with each other, and with certain Singer novices. There are four types, each with distinct abilities and ways of life.

==== Merlee ====
Merlee is half-fish, half-humans inhabiting the seas around the Isle of Echoes. They live in large shoals, each presided over by one dominant male. Their children hatch from eggs, and at a young age resemble tadpoles, which live in pouches inside their mothers. Merlee have the power to control the weather on the ocean, creating storms, mists or clear days depending on their mood and their relationship with those on the ships currently travelling. They are notoriously forgetful, and may have to be reminded several times to maintain the weather asked of them. Although they cannot speak human languages, the merlee have a close relationship with Singers, and often communicate through Wild Speech with novices on the Isle, although they are closest to Rialle, who maintained to ability to speak with them into adulthood and lives in a cave in order to remain close to them.

==== Quetzal ====
Quetzal are half-bird, half-human beings living in The Quetzal Forest. They have wings as well as arms, and beaks instead of mouths, and come in a variety of colours. They hatch from brightly coloured eggs in treetop nests, and although colourless eggs are sometimes laid, they are considered by the mothers to be unlucky and are rolled out of the nest. Quetzal naturally flock together in groups, and all quetzal share access to a collective Memoryplace, to which every quetzal can add. By accessing the Memoryplace using yellow flowers, it is possible for humans to learn about both the past and the possible futures of the world. Because of the extreme accuracy of the Memoryplace, quetzal are natural mimics. They cannot generally speak human languages except while mimicking, but under Frazhin's control Night Plume and his flock learned to speak, as well as how to produce bows and arrows fletched with their own feathers.

==== Naga ====
Naga are half-human, half-water-snake, and live in rivers and other fresh water. Their children are born from eggs in caverns near the Fall of Clouds, and all naga obsessively collect glittering objects, generally called "sparklies". They can be communicated with only through Wild Speech, and can be called to from most river banks.

==== Centaurs ====
Centaurs are half-horse, half-humans living on the Purple Plains. They live in herds ruled over by a stallion, and their horse bodies are shades of blue and purple ranging from nearly white to nearly black. They wear mare's-hair tunics on their upper bodies, and are the only Half Creatures able to communicate through human speech, although they generally use a form of Wild Speech known as Herd. Every adult in the herd carries a herdstone, and to join the herd foals must independently travel to the Dancing Canyons and extract a herdstone of their own from the rock. Centaurs can use these herdstones to bend light around themselves, rendering the herd invisible from the outside, and they used this ability to hide their existence from humans until the events of Crystal Mask. Centaurs have developed powerful kicks for hunting and defence which make them very dangerous to attack.

=== Stones of Power ===
Several forms of stone in the series are shown to have magical properties; in Dark Quetzal, these are referred to as the three Stones of Power of the Earth: the blue (bluestone), the green (herdstones) and the black (khiz crystal).

==== Bluestone ====
Bluestone is the material the Isle of Echoes is made of, and it has many properties related to the Singers. Its presence amplifies the power of the Songs, and for this reason the Echorium is constructed out of it. It can also help transmit Songs and messages over great distances: when the Second Singer travels, he often takes with him a piece of bluestone with which to contact the Echorium. Although bluestone is only found on the Isle and is considered very valuable, it is occasionally given away as a "trust gift" to those who make treaties with Singers, so that they can be sung to over a distance if the need arises.

==== Khiz ====
Khiz, sometimes called khiz-crystal or crystal, is a black crystal with many properties similar to bluestone. In addition to conducting the Songs and relaying messages over large distances, it controls and views people's thoughts and memories. Treated khiz can also help resist the Songs' power, and sap people nearby of their will. Khiz is mined primarily in The Sunless Valley in the Purple Plains, and is the weapon of choice for Frazhin. Frazhin often carries a khiz-spear with which to control people around him, and after Song Quest he uses khiz masks to hide his disfigurement, apparently replacing some of his injured body parts with khiz.

Many parts of the series revolve around the khiz. In Song Quest, the khiz was worshipped, with Frazhin as its priest, using it to control thoughts and force others to tell the truth. In Crystal Mask, Frazhin created a khiz mining operation in The Sunless Valley and built the Khizalace out of the crystal. He also used a pair of khiz masks to communicate with Yashra over long distances and to allow her to wipe people's memories, and a piece of khiz crystal was placed in Kherron's throat to disable his singing voice. In Dark Quetzal, placing khiz in nests is used to make Half Creatures loyal to Frazhin, and khiz is shown to be able to control the quetzal Memoryplace, both as a khiz spear and as the Fane, a giant ball of the crystal, which Frazhin seals himself inside.

==== Herdstones ====
Herdstones are green stones extracted from the Dancing Canyons. They can be used to bend the light around an area, rendering anyone in that area invisible from the outside. As they are very hard to extract from the rock, they are primarily used by centaurs, although one is also possessed by Shaiala.

== Locations ==
=== Isle of Echoes ===
The Isle of Echoes is a small island made entirely of bluestone and situated in the Western Sea, ten days sail from Silvertown and thirty from Southport on the Purple Plains. It is the home of the Echorium and the Singers, and therefore one of the most important locations in the series. The island is the setting for the beginning and ending of every novel except Dark Quetzal (which begins on the Isle, but ends on the Purple Plains). In addition to the Singers, the Isle of Echoes houses a number of orderlies, patients visiting the Isle for treatment, and several non-Singer villages, the largest of which is called Harbourtown, in which the main trade is fishing. The waters around the Isle are infested with merlee, and although the Singers are viewed with superstition by many mainlanders, there is a strong trade link with Silvertown based upon the Singer's therapies.

==== The Echorium ====
The Echorium is the collective name for the complex of bluestone buildings in which the Singers live. It is located in the centre of the Isle of Echoes and includes housing for Singers, novices and orderlies, classrooms, treatment cells, offices and the Pentangle. Nearby, although not technically in the Echorium, is the Birthing House.

The Pentangle is considered to be the heart of the Echorium. A five-sided bluestone chamber, it is the location for all official Songs and the focus of the Singers' power. Nearby, several treatment cells are located for those awaiting or recovering from Songs, along with stores of the Song Potion used to relax patients. Typically, those awaiting Songs are the ill from the Mainland or the Isle, awaiting treatment for their illness, but disobedient novices may be sent for punishment Songs, and occasionally, the Pentangle is used to send a punishment or healing Song via a bluestone trust gift to a distant recipient.

Important Singers may have offices near the Pentangle; the daily life of the Echorium is traditionally run by a female First Singer, while a male Second Singer represents the Echorium's interests overseas. The Second Singer usually travels on the official Echorium ship, which is known as the Wavesong. All adult Singers, with the exception of the claustrophobic Rialle, live in the Echorium, where it is easiest for them to fulfil the two main duties asked of them in repayment for their teaching on the Isle: to teach the novices of the Echorium, and to sing on the Pentangle. Singer training begins from an early age, and Singers are expected to give their children to the Echorium as novices.

These novices are born and raised in the Birthing House, then move to the Echorium when they are old enough to begin their studies. Novice classes are arranged so that the entire class begins puberty - particularly, the changes to their voice - at around the same time, in their Final Year. Crystal Mask suggests that (male) novices remain at the Echorium for nine years, and Dark Quetzal gives Kyarra, who is a year younger than the rest of her Final Year class, as eleven years old. Together, these statements suggest that novices begin classes at the age of three, but since boys in the class are expected to be older (since they enter puberty later), this figure may not be wholly accurate.

Novices attend Singer-taught classes in many subjects, including Songs, Diplomacy and History. At the end of their schooling, only those with the best voices are accepted as Singers, while the others are given a mild form of Yehn to make them forget the Songs and then are trained as orderlies. Typically, male orderlies supervise the security of the Singers, including travelling with the Second Singer in groups of five known as Pentads, while female orderlies work in the Birthing House. Orderlies and Singers alike must work for a certain number of years to repay the debt for their schooling but are free to leave The Echorium, although many choose to stay.

=== Silvertown ===
Silvertown is the nearest town to the Isle of the Echoes, approximately ten days sail away. It is a centre for trade in the region, and the beginning of the Great South trade route, which runs down the coast to Rivermeet in the Purple Plains. It features in both Song Quest and Dark Quetzal, primarily as the halfway point between the Isle of Echoes and the Karchhold. The town's inhabitants are known to be wary of both Singers and Karchholders - the former due to superstition, and the latter due to vicious raids conducted before Song Quest.

=== The Karchhold ===
The Karchhold is a kingdom in the northern mountains, which is ruled over at the time of the series by the Karchlord Azri. It is one of the main settings for Song Quest, as the base for both Frazhin, who acts as the khizpriest and head of the area's religion, and the merlee hunters wanted by the Singer delegation. The mountainous region is almost impassable, and often at risk of avalanches, in the winter. The inhabitants of the region - known as Karchholders - are known as ferocious warriors, and wear the finger bones of their dead enemies in their braided hair to show prowess in battle.

=== Purple Plains ===
To the South of Silvertown, the Purple Plains is a large, mostly empty region occupied mainly by nomadic tribes called the Horselords. The main tribes featured in the series are the Kaleri and the Harai, the latter considered untrustworthy. Although much of the region is uninhabited, some large towns on the rivers aid the Great South trade route, including Southport and Rivermeet. The Plains are the main location for Crystal Mask, in which they are the home of Shaiala Two Hoof and the location for Frazhin's Khizalace, and also appear in Dark Quetzal. The area is home to both centaurs and nagas and is a source of headstones in the Dancing Canyons and khiz crystal, in the Sunless Valley which can only be reached through underwater tunnels or through the Pass of Silence, which is prone to avalanches.

=== Quetzal Forest ===
Quetzal Forest is a large, mostly uncharted forest occupying much of the area between the Karch and the Purple Plains. As the name suggests, it is the natural habitat of the quetzal, but also provides a home for the Forest People, a mysterious race who use the unique flora of the forest to produce astounding healing potions and to see into the future by accessing the quetzal Memoryplace. The Forest is the main setting for Dark Quetzal and is the home of Night Plume's flock in Frazhin's Starmaker temple.

== See also ==
- Characters in The Echorium Sequence
