= I Am the Great Horse =

2006 novel

- Author: Katherine Roberts
- Illustrator: Tim O' Brien
- Language: English
- Genre: Young adult fantasy
- Publisher: The Chicken House
- Publication date: August 2006
- Publication place: United Kingdom
- Media type: Print (Hardback & Paperback)
- Pages: 401 (first edition, hardcover)
- ISBN: 0-439-82163-0
- OCLC: 61731246
- LC Class: PZ7.R54325 Iam 2006

I Am the Great Horse is a historical fantasy novel by English writer Katherine Roberts, published in August 2006 by The Chicken House and aimed at teens. It is about the life of Alexander the Great, told from the point of view of his horse, Bucephalus.

== Plot summary ==
The pair meet in Pella, Macedonia, and Alexander manages to be the only rider on Bucephalus after a battle in which Bucephalas lost his left eye by an enemy pike.

Katherine Roberts acknowledges that the characters Charmia and Tydeos, both grooms in the royal stable, are fictional, as is the evil horsemaster. The names of the other horses are also fictional, though the horses themselves were real enough. Prince Ochus, King Darius's son, was given a larger part than in most records, and the ghosts that Bucephalus often sees are also fictional.

When the battle-scarred horse Bucephalas allows a young Alexander and a runaway girl to sit on his back, he is bound to them forever. Bucephalas then carries the young Alexander into battle, blazing a trail to the very edge of the world in his master's search for glory and adventure. The girl, Charm, works as a lowly stable hand, who brushes away the ghosts Bucephalas sees and forgives his arrogant ways. In contrast to Alexander, however, Charm is driven by shadowy reasons to stay by his side. Through Bucephalas' perspective, history, mystery and adventure unfold.
