= Katherine Roberts (author) =

English author

- Occupation: Novelist
- Writing career
- Genre: Fantasy
- Website: katherineroberts.com

Katherine Roberts is an English author, best known for her fantasy trilogy The Echorium Sequence. She spent most of her childhood in Devon and Cornwall, England. She is the daughter of Derek Robert, an electrical engineer, and Dorothy Margaret, a teacher.

== Early life ==
Katherine Roberts spent most of her childhood in Devon and Cornwall where she was born. She first entered education at an infant school in Redruth (Cornwall), later on joining the Oldway County Primary School in Paignton (Devon) and then moving onto Torquay Grammar School for Girls (also in Devon). She graduated with a first degree in mathematics from the University of Bath. Following on from that, she has had numerous jobs associated with programming computers, looking after racehorses and a job in a pet shop.

== Writing career ==
In 1999, her first book Song Quest was published, winning the Branford Boase Award for children. She later published Crystal Mask (2001) and Dark Quetzal (2003) which were both in the same series.

In 2001, she published the first novel in The Seven Fabulous Wonders series called The Great Pyramid Robbery, which the Sunday Express said was "A terrific tale of plots, curses and evil forces set in ancient Egypt". This was followed on with The Babylon Game in 2002, which was said to be "Incredible... adventures that twist and turn and will have you spellbound on every page," by the Children's Book of the Week, South Wales Evening Post. The same year, the third book in the series, The Amazon Temple Quest, was published, and in 2003, The Mausoleum Murder was also published. Following on from this, in 2004 and 2005, The Olympic Conspiracy and The Colossus Crisis were also published within the series. The series concluded in 2006 with the seventh book, The Cleopatra Curse.

Katherine Roberts has also produced other books such as Spellfall, which The Sunday Times Children's Book of the Week said, "this magical and fantastical story from Roberts has lessons for real children about taking responsibility.", and its sequel Spell Spring (2016), and an epic novel about Alexander the Great from the horse's mouth I Am the Great Horse (2006).

She mainly writes within the fantasy genre.

Since 2014, she has been a Royal Literary Fund Fellow in universities, helping students with their academic writing.

== Bibliography ==
Katherine Roberts has written a range of books, mostly belonging to The Echorium Sequence and The Seven Fabulous Wonders series. She has also written several short stories.

=== The Echorium Sequence ===
- Song Quest (1999)
- Crystal Mask (2001)
- Dark Quetzal (2003)

=== The Seven Fabulous Wonders ===
- The Great Pyramid Robbery (2001)
- The Babylon Game (2002)
- The Amazon Temple Quest (2002)
- The Mausoleum Murder (2003)
- The Olympic Conspiracy (2004)
- The Colossus Crisis (2005)
- The Cleopatra Curse (2006)

=== Pendragon Legacy ===
- Sword of Light (2012)
- Lance of Truth (2012)
- Crown of Dreams (2013)
- Grail of Stars (2014)
- Horse of Mist (prequel) (2014)

=== Earthaven ===
- Spellfall (2001)
- Spell Spring (2016)

=== Other books ===
- I Am the Great Horse (2006)
- Magical Horses (2009)
- The Horse Who Would Be Emperor (2018)
- Mythic & Magical (2011)
- Weird & Wonderful (2012)
- Heroic & Historical (2014)

== Awards ==
- Raconteur Award (1995) - Across the Water
- Story Cellar Award (1994) - Mars Take Seed Make Man
- Grotesque Readers Award (1996) - Fatstock
- Broadsword Fiction of the Year Award (1996) - Under the Eyemoon
- Branford Boase Award (2000) - Song Quest
