= Ren Yano =

Japanese calligrapher

- 矢野 仁
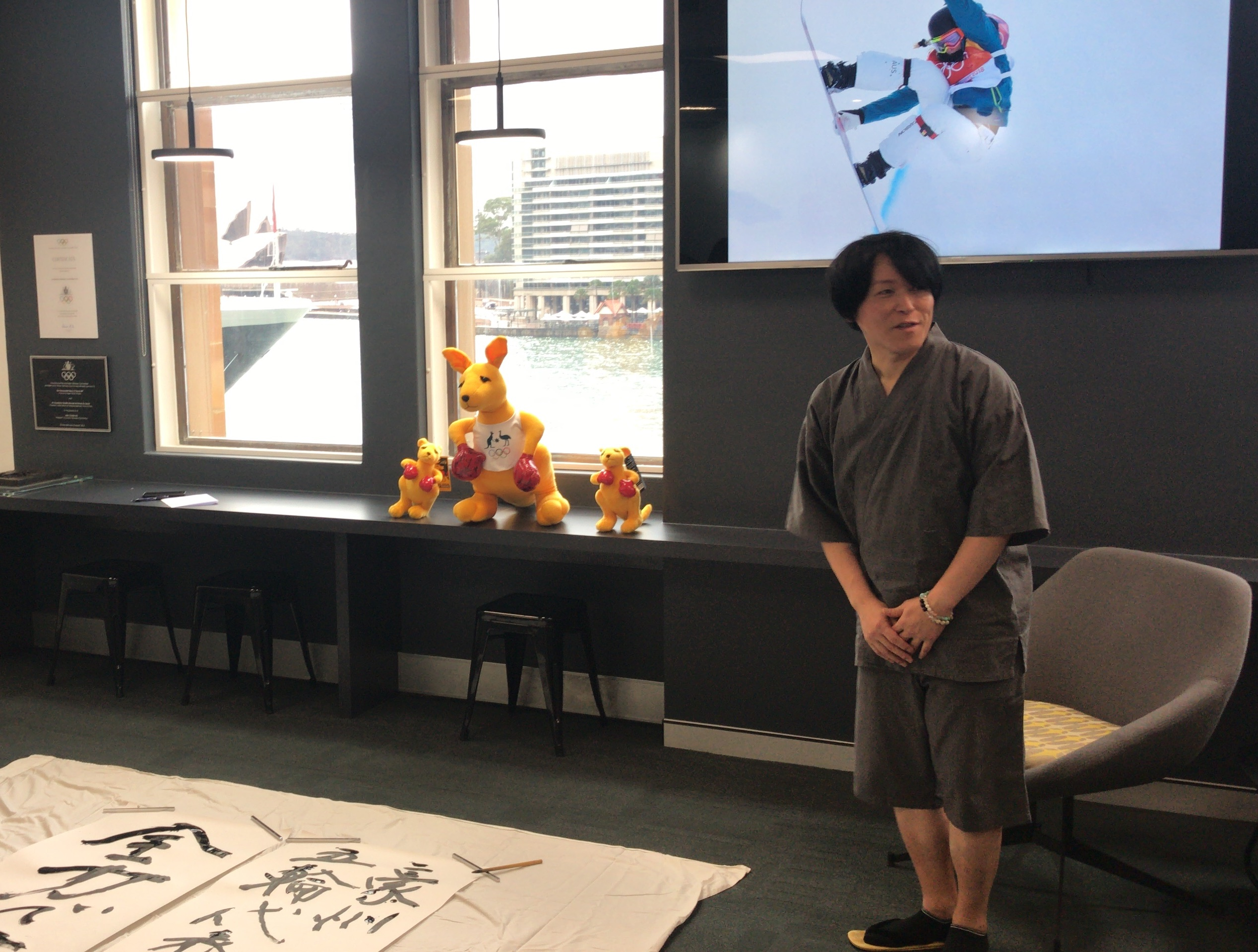
- Yan performance at AOC, March 2020
- Born: 矢野 仁之（Hitoshi Yano） 12 March
- Occupations: Artist, calligrapher; 書家
- Years active: 1990s-present

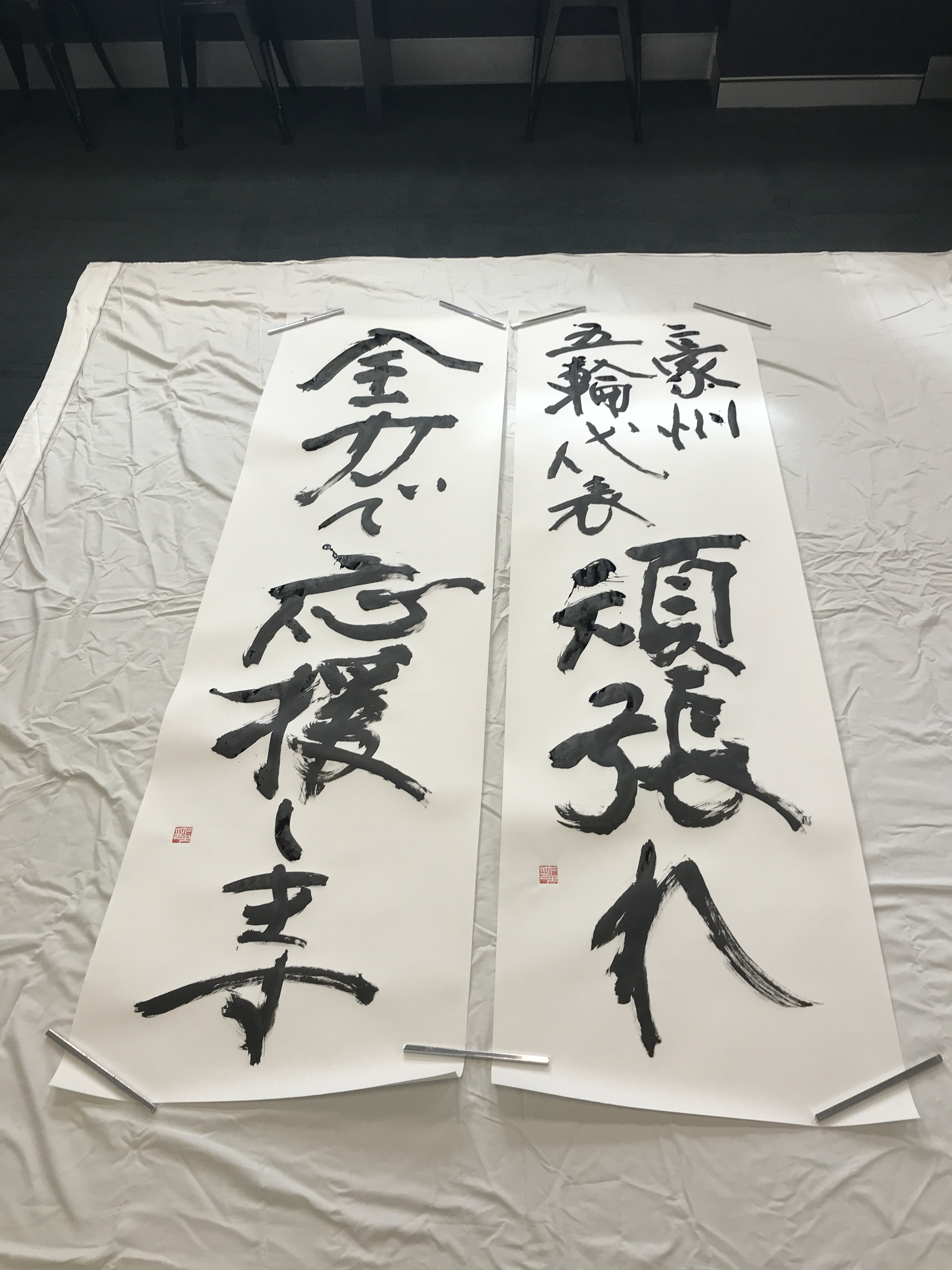
His writing at AOC 9 March 2020

Ren Yano (矢野 仁, Yano Ren; born 12 March) is a Japanese traditional calligrapher (書家) and artist.

In 2003 he obtained a permanent residence status as an artist for a special skill visa in Australia, and while teaching at RENCLUB, he is working to build a bridge between Australia and Japan through his large calligraphy performances, exhibitions, and personal exhibitions.

He has collaborated on Hollywood movies such as The Wolverine (2013) and Gods of Egypt (2016), supported performances in response to the Great East Japan Earthquake in 2011, a solo support exhibition for the Australian Forest Fire in 2019, and a performance for the 2020 Tokyo Olympic and Paralympic Games.

He has been very active with radio broadcasts on SBS in December 2013 and TV programme "Nihongo Daisuki", contributing monthly articles to the Nichigo Press since May 2008, performing at Matsuri and JAPAN EXPO since 2022 all over Sydney and holding workshops in Gojyuan in Balmaine. He has performed at the Art Gallery of NSW.

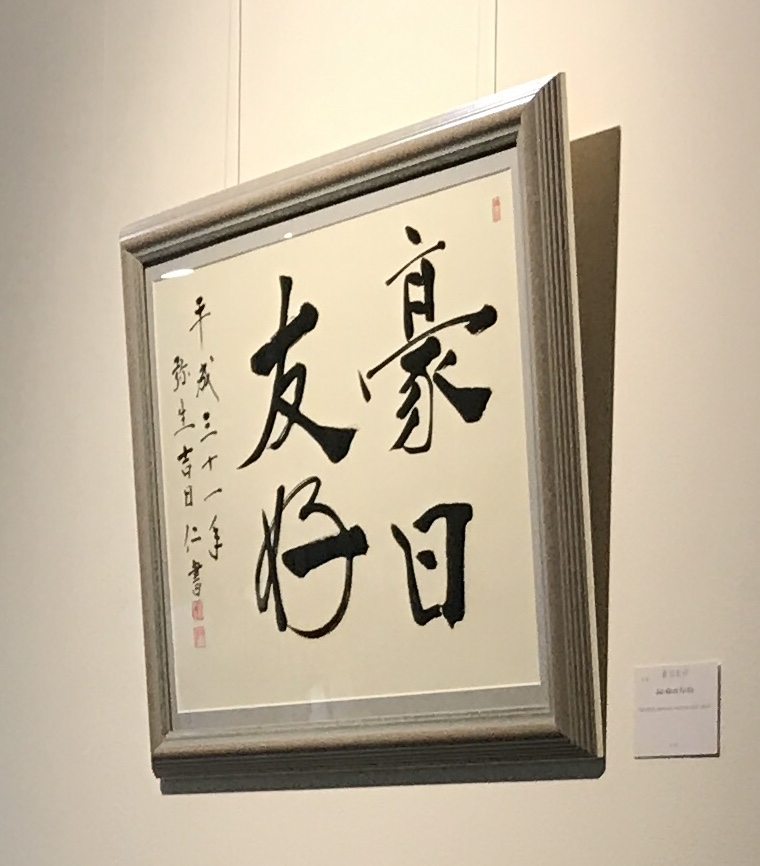
His work, A friendship between Australia and Japan.

In 2010, his work "Furusato" (Eng. Hometown) was recognised as a national property through the Ministry of Foreign Affairs, and in 2016 he received the Consul General Award. His work, "Reiwa" (令和) — which was written when the era name in Japan was changed in 2019 — is now exhibited at the official residence of the Consul General of Japan in Sydney. In 2019, he donated his work "Go-Nichi Yuuko" (豪日友好 Eng. A friendship between Australia and Japan) for the 75th annual ceremony of Cowra Breakout.

In 2020, his achievements in Australia were recognised and he was introduced as Japan's representative calligrapher in Australia to the Calligraphy section of the Japanese Cultural Directory managed by the Consulate-General of Japan in Sydney.

On 27 March 2026, he performed a large-scale calligraphy demonstration during the tea break at a conference held at the NSW Department of Education in Parramatta, commemorating the 50th anniversary of the Japan–Australia Basic Treaty of Friendship and Cooperation.
