= Hitoshi Kumano-Go =

Japanese mathematician

Hitoshi Kumano-Go (4 October 1935 – 24 August 1982) was a Japanese mathematician who specialized in partial differential equations. He is especially recognized for his work on pseudo-differential operators and Fourier integral operators.

== Life ==
Hitoshi Kumano-go was born on 4 October 1935 in Arita, Wakayama Prefecture. After finishing high school in 1954, he studied mathematics and graduated from Osaka University in 1958. He started a doctoral work at the same university under the supervision of Mitio Nagumo. He received his PhD in 1963. He was promoted to associate professor in 1967 and to full professorship in 1971. From 1967 to 1969, Kumano-go had been a visiting member at the Courant Institute of Mathematical Sciences of New York University. In May 1981 he entered Osaka University Hospital where a brain tumor was discovered. Kumano-go died on 24 August 1982 in Osaka at the age of 46.

== Work ==
Kumano-Go first studied the local and global uniqueness of the solutions of the Cauchy problem for partial differential equations. While at the Courant Institute of Mathematical Sciences, Kumano-Go collaborated with Kurt Friedrichs, Peter Lax and Louis Nirenberg among others. He made major contributions to the theory of pseudo-differential operators. Its work contributed to the construction of the fundamental solution of a first order hyperbolic partial differential equation. His treatise on pseudo differential operators was first published in Japanese in 1974 and translated into English in 1981.

Kumano-Go also made important contribution to the study of Fourier integral operators.
