= Ren, Iran =

Ren رن
- village
- Location within Iran
- Coordinates: 26°50′24″N 58°12′00″E
- Country: Iran
- Province: Kerman
- County: Qaleh Ganj
- Bakhsh: Chah Dadkhoda
- Rural District: Marz

Population (2006)
  - Total: 96
- Time zone: UTC+3:30 (IRST)
  - Summer (DST): UTC+4:30 (IRDT)
- ISO 3166 code: IRN

Ren (Persian: رن) is a village in Marz Rural District, Chah Dadkhoda District, Qaleh Ganj County, Kerman Province, Iran. In the 2006 census, it had a population of 96 people living in 16 households.
