= Frenn =

Frenn may refer to the following people:

- Chawky Frenn, American (born in Lebanon) artist, art professor and author
- George Frenn (1941–2006), American hammer thrower, weight thrower and powerlifter
- Jason Frenn (born 1966), American evangelist and author
- Frenn, a character of The Echorium Sequence (1999–2001) by Katherine Roberts
