= Hitoshi Fugo =

Japanese photographer

- 普後 均
- Born: 1947 (age 78–79); Kanagawa, Japan
- Education: Nihon University
- Occupation: Photographer
- Awards: Nobuo Ina Award (2010)
- Website: hitoshifugo.com

Hitoshi Fugo (普後 均, Fugo Hitoshi; born 1947) is a Japanese photographer.

Hitoshi Fugo is a graduate of the photography programme at Nihon University and was mentored by Eikoh Hosoe. He is mostly known for his conceptual 'On the Circle,' and 'Flying Frying Pan' series, both of which are available as books. He has exhibited at Kushiro Art Museum, Hokkaido, AKAAKA Gallery, Tokyo, Shanghai Museum, Shanghai, Miyako Yoshinaga Gallery, New York, Okayama Prefectural Museum of Art, Okayama City, Photo Gallery International, Tokyo, and Tokyo Metropolitan Museum of Photography, Tokyo.

Fugo's Flying Frying Pan was published in book form in September 1997 by Shazow Ltd., Tokyo (ISBN 978-4-916218-00-1). The collection as published has no text, but a separate insert is included with a short essay by Toshiharu Ito, professor of art history at Tama University of Art (Japanese, with an English translation by Colin Talcroft) and commentary in English by cultural historian Steven Watson (translated into Japanese, translation uncredited), as well as short biographies of Fugo, Ito, and Watson (in Japanese and English translation).

Fugo's introspective and sometimes highly abstracted series '暗転' ('Anten', or 'BLACKOUT' in English), was made during his travels to India, Nepal, and elsewhere during the 1970s, 1980s, and 1990s, was exhibited at Miyako Yoshinaga Gallery, New York, March 8-April 14, 2018.
