= Hitoshi Nakamura =

Japanese ice hockey player

Personal information
- Nationality: Japanese
- Born: 29 April 1949 (age 76) Hokkaido, Japan

Sport
- Sport: Ice hockey

Hitoshi Nakamura (中村 等, Nakamura Hitoshi; born 29 April 1949) is a Japanese ice hockey player. He competed in the men's tournaments at the 1976 Winter Olympics and the 1980 Winter Olympics.
