= Hitoshi Nomura =

Japanese contemporary artist (1945–2023)

Hitoshi Nomura (Nomura Hitoshi, 野村仁; 1945 – 3 October 2023) was a Japanese contemporary artist.

While he initially trained in sculpture, his work has developed into ephemeral, process-based and conceptual forms of artworks. The central theme of his work, around which he will experiment throughout his life, is time, and the dynamics of transformation that are linked to it, such as deterioration, evaporation, fusion. In the 1970s, he defined the theme of his work as the attempt to "represent the characteristics of time and space in equal prominence" through his art. The use of photography in his work is decisive, whether this medium is used to document his action or to "sculpt time".

== Education and early works ==
Nomura was born in 1945 in Hyōgo Prefecture. He graduated in 1967 from the Kyoto City University of Arts sculpture department. However, from his graduation exhibition, which was shown in 1969 in front of the Kyoto Municipal Museum of Art, the artist has manifested an interest in time in sculpture. This work, Tardiology (1968–69), is composed of four large boxes, stacked on top of each other as it was initially presented on 18 March 1969. In contrast to the monumental perennial works in the public space, this work was intended to collapse over time under its own weight. Tardiology's process of self-deconstruction was gradual, due to exposure to gravity. The name of the work refers, according to the artist, to the neologism of "theory of lag", highlighting the gap between current experience and the perception of time as a series of discrete events.

With his early works, such as Tardiology, Nomura began to turn away from the object per se to the passage of time, the foundations of matter and the rhythms of the universe. Persistence and repetition over long periods of time are the central characteristics of his process-oriented practice. As early as 1969, Nomura began making films and sound pieces using oxygen, dry ice and other materials that are more often associated with science than art. Rather than presenting a fully realized object in advance, Nomura consciously pursued a process of change, with the installation of the work being only "the starting point" of a structure that "gravity, wind, rain and time" will gradually break down.

== Works ==
=== Photography-as-documentation-as-artwork approach ===
Following the example of several Japanese artist collectives, such as The Play, or the mail-art group Psychophysiology Research Institute, his process-oriented practice mobilizes documentation (photographic and videographic capture, texts), in an enlarged conception of the artwork. The event that triggered his reflection was the fall of boxes containing his works stored under his eaves and exposed to the natural elements, causing the boxes deteriorated. From this experience, he began to work around the process of alteration and the theme of the passage of time, which became central to his work.

Nomura is recognized as one of the first Japanese to use photography in an artistic context. This is particularly evident in the works he produced in the late 1960s. Nomura created installations directly in natural and urban spaces and photographed them, respecting a certain interval between each shot in order to document their natural decomposition. Photography was the most effective medium for documenting the artist's ephemeral actions such as Tardiology (1968–69), a cardboard structure frozen in its collapse, Dry Ice (1970), evaporating ice cubes. In the continuation of this practice of documentation, Nomura made a report of what he could see from a public phone booth to a museum curator. This was recorded and became a sound art in Telephone Eyeshot (1970).

=== Dry Ice (1970) ===
His Dry Ice series is particularly important in the process of legitimizing documentation as a work of art by art institutions. Indeed, while the piece appears at first glance to be a gimmick of the conceptual art forms in vogue in the 1960s and 1970s, of which Nomura was aware, it differs radically in its emphasis on the physical phenomenon of fusion, of the evaporation of matter, and its role as an artist witnessing and archiving this process. Indeed, once the blocks of ice were arranged in space, on a long blackboard, the artist weighed and dated them. Then, once a photograph was taken, he would move them and re-inscribe the time and their new weight. In 1970, on the occasion of 10th International Art Exhibition of Japan (Tokyo Biennale '70) Between Man and Matter, at the Tokyo Metropolitan Art Museum, Nomura exhibited a series of 10 photographs of Dry Ice. The series was recognized as an artwork, both as an action and as a documentation, as were the works by Kawaguchi Tatsuo and Jan Dibbets in the same exhibition. At the time, few Japanese artists kept records of their performances, which they often delegated to others. The photographs of the Japanese artist group Hi Red Center cleaning the street can be cited as some of the earliest documentation of performance art. This recognition of photographic recording as an integral part of the artistic process is concomitant with the growing, though still fragile in 1970, institutionalization of contemporary art (gendai bijutsu) in Japan.

=== "Moon" score (1975–) ===
The photographic medium was also used by Nomura Hitoshi for its own qualities and as a means of sculpting time. This new perspective of work is concomitant with a new scale of observation. Indeed, in series such as "moon" score (1975–) and Earth Rotation (1978–79), Nomura uses, in addition to cameras, sophisticated telescopes and computers to record the passage of time, and the movements of stars and planets. In the Moon score series, Nomura photographed the movements of the moon each night between December 1975 and June 1979. Each night constitutes 34 shots as well as two images of a meteorological journal including the date, the moon's phase, moonrise and moonset. These images are presented as black and white contact prints as well as large scale black and white prints. Each shot has been double-exposed with several lines constituting a musical staff. Thus, some plates became musical scores (the moon materializing a musical note), were interpreted by orchestras and became autonomous musical pieces.

Sometimes the moon is not taken in focus, Nomura using neither tripod nor super-zoom, resulting in a blur of movement. For Nomura, this is all the more conducive to generating musicality.

=== Ten-Year Photobook or the Brownian Motion of Eyesight (1972–1982) ===
Between 1972 and 1982, Nomura photographed everything he could see, in his daily life, in order to make 100 feet of silver film, each month. These images were published as a series, in the form of 120 hardcover tomes, one per month, containing 21 frames in each page, and entitled Ten-Year Photobook or the Brownian Motion of Eyesight. This piece could be exhibited in different formats as well, notably as a film projection, showing then four frames per second, under the title The Brownian Motion of Eyesight. This diversity in the monstration of this piece allows Nomura to open up temporalities, to no longer privilege a single typology of temporality, neither that of the cinema, nor that of the photographic decisive moment.

=== Art and science ===
Nomura said in an interview that as a young student he loved nature and planned to study science until he "succumbed to temptation" and studied art instead. If his early work can be understood as relating to the series of far-flung experiments that have been grouped under the rubric of global conceptual art, corresponding to the phenomenon described by scholar Reiko Tomii by the term "international contemporaneity", Nomura's path was based on his own combination of art and science, seeking to blur the lines between the two disciplines.

In 1980, Nomura began making daytime exposures (Analemma series) that followed the sun across the sky; in doing so, he observed the phenomenon of the contrast between concave and convex lines over the course of a year. The photographic repetition accentuates the symbolic significance of this phenomenon of endless regeneration. As part of his interest in the sun, Nomura has been collecting asteroids for the past two decades and has also been building and racing solar-powered cars since 1993.

This exploration of Nomura towards the sun, the stars and the cosmos, is decisive for understanding the movement of his artistic approach, which links the specific with the infinite, putting perception at the center of his experiments with space, time and matter: “I’m interested in the forces of nature. My art gives my observations of those forces visible form. The Earth itself is the greatest timepiece; it is its own best timekeeper.”

== Death ==
Hitoshi Nomura died from pneumonia on 3 October 2023, at the age of 78.
