= Renn =

Renn is a both a surname and given name. Notable people with the name include:

== Surname ==
- Crystal Renn (born 1986), American model and author
- Jürgen Renn (born 1956), German science historian and physicist
- Ludwig Renn (1889–1979), German author
- Mark Renn (1952–2019), British sculptor and muralist
- Nancy Lapp (née Renn; born 1930), American archeologist, biblical scholar, and museum curator
- Olaf Renn (born 1969), German footballer
- Samuel Renn (1786–1845), English pipe organ builder and businessman
- Trey Kaufman-Renn (born 2002), American basketball player
- W. S. Renn Jr. (born 1928), American football coach

=== Fictional characters ===
- Max Renn, a leading role in the 1983 film Videodrome
- Singer Renn, in The Echorium Sequence trilogy of novels (1999–2003), by Katherine Roberts
- Renn, a major character from the prehistoric fantasy series Chronicles of Ancient Darkness

== First and middle name ==
- Amaryllis Collymore (middle name Renn; 1745 or 1750–1828), Afro-Barbadian sugar plantation and slave owner, businesswoman, and manumitted slave
- Renn Crichlow (born 1968), Canadian kayaker, canoeist, and orthopedic surgeon
- Renn Hampden (1793–1868), English Anglican clergyman and divinity professor
- Renn Hampden (died 1852), British politician
- Renn Hawkey (born 1974), American musician, songwriter, film producer, and actor
- Renn Kiriyama (born 1985), Japanese actor
- Renn Woods (born 1958), American actor, vocalist, and songwriter
- Renn (artist) is the pseudonym used by a Namibian artist exhibited at the 59th Venice Biennale in the context of the first Namibian National Participation

== See also ==
- Ren (disambiguation)
- Renn Fayre (originally Renaissance Fayre), an annual festival held at Reed College in Portland, Oregon, USA
- Rennie (disambiguation)
