= Rennie (disambiguation) =

Rennie is a surname and a given name. It may also refer to:

== Places ==
- Rennie, New South Wales, Australia, a small town
- Rennie, Manitoba, Canada, a community in the Rural Municipality of Reynolds
- Rennie Lake, Michigan, United States
- Rennie Island, Washington, United States
- Rennie, Cork, once the home of Edmund Spenser, now in ruins
- Mount Rennie, Anvers Island in the Palmer Archipelago, off Antarctica

== Other uses ==
- Rennie Football Club, an Australian rules football club in Rennie, New South Wales
- Rennie v. Klein, an American legal case about mental illness
- Rennie Memorial Medal, an Australian annual chemical science award
- Bayer's own branded antacid tablets

== See also ==
- John Rennie High School, Quebec, Canada
- Rennie Memorial Presbyterian Church, Amelia County, Virginia, United States
- Rieni, Romania, a commune
- Rini (disambiguation)
