= Wat Tyler =

Leader of the 1381 Peasants' Revolt (1341 or c. 1320 – 1381)

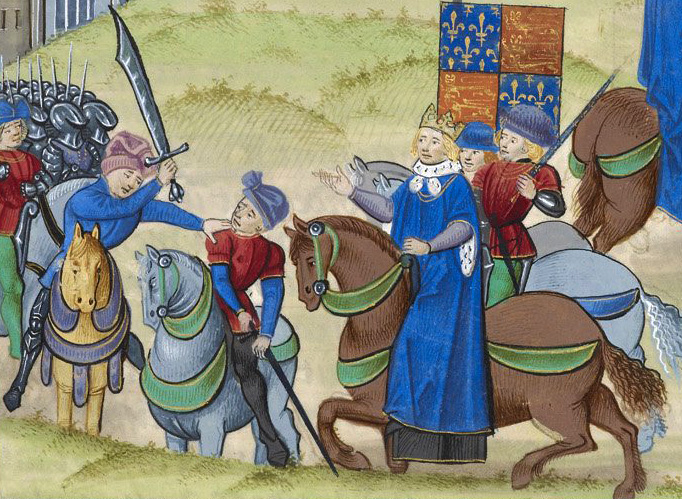
- Tyler's death (left to right: Sir William Walworth, Mayor of London (wielding sword); Wat Tyler; King Richard II; and Sir John Cavendish, esquire to the king (bearing decorated sword))
- Born: 4 January 1341 or c. 1320; Kent or Essex, England
- Died: 15 June 1381 (aged 40 or 61); London, England
- Known for: Peasants' Revolt

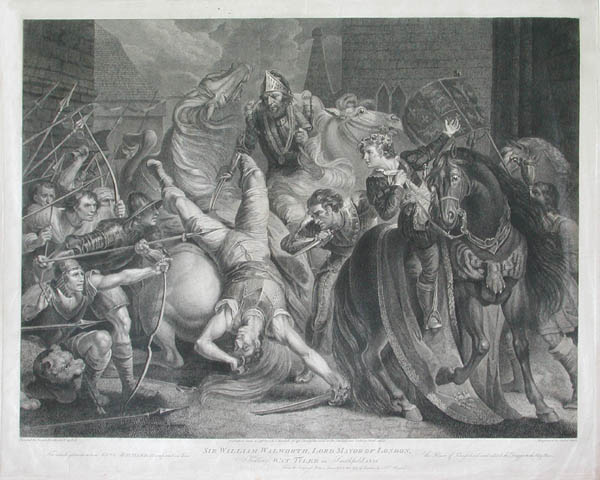
Engraving by Anker Smith

Wat Tyler (1341 or c. 1320 – 15 June 1381) was a 'working class' leader of the 1381 Peasants' Revolt in England to oppose the collection of a poll tax and to demand just and fair economic and social reforms.

== Early life ==
Little is known of Tyler's early life. Historical sources give differing years for his birth, one as early as 1320, though most historians agree that he was born around 1341. "Wat" may have been his given name (derived from the Old English name Watt), or a diminutive form of the name Walter; his original surname was unknown. The surname "Tyler" may have come from his occupation as a roof tiler, and he probably lived in Kent or Essex. He has variously been represented as coming from Deptford, Dartford and Maidstone in Kent, as well as Colchester in Essex. Several chroniclers report that he served in France during earlier campaigns of the Hundred Years War as an archer.

== Peasants' Revolt ==
The Peasants' Revolt began in May 1381, triggered by a recently imposed poll tax of four pence from every person aged fifteen and above, whether peasant or wealthy. The revolt was not only over money, as the peasants also sought increased liberty and other social reforms. They demanded that each labourer be allowed to work for the employer of his choice and sought an end to serfdom and other rigid social distinctions. Peasants rose up across England, especially in Essex and Kent, but were opposed by a significant part of English society in those regions, including nobility and wealthy religious establishments. Many peasants and labourers were inspired by the utopian teachings of John Ball, a radical priest who preached that all humans should be treated equally, as descendants of Adam and Eve, and who asked: "When Adam delved and Eve span/Who was then the gentleman?"

How Tyler became involved with the revolt is unknown, although a much later 16th-century source indicates that a man of a similar name, John Tyler, was its initiator. This account suggests that a poll-tax collector had sexually assaulted John Tyler's daughter. It is suggested the poll tax collector "pulled up his daughter's clothes to see if she arrived at the age of puberty". In revenge he killed the miscreant and triggered the insurgency. According to article "Boys of English History" from The Boy's Own Paper (1879), Tyler "slew the wretch with his hammer", presumably a tool used in his trade, after the tax collector "vilely insulted the maiden". Regardless of the veracity of that story, by June 1381, when groups of rebels from across the country converged to assault London, Wat Tyler had emerged as a leader of the Kentish forces.

On 13 June 1381 Tyler with other rebels of Kent crossed London Bridge to enter the city, as Stow recorded in his Summary and Annals. Once in the city, they attacked civil targets, destroying legal records, opening prisons, sacking homes, and killing those they thought were associated with the royal government. In response, King Richard II (then 14 years old) met the rebels on 14 June and agreed to make many concessions and to give the rebels full pardons. While some of the rebels were satisfied by the king's promises and dispersed, Tyler and his followers persisted.

== Death ==
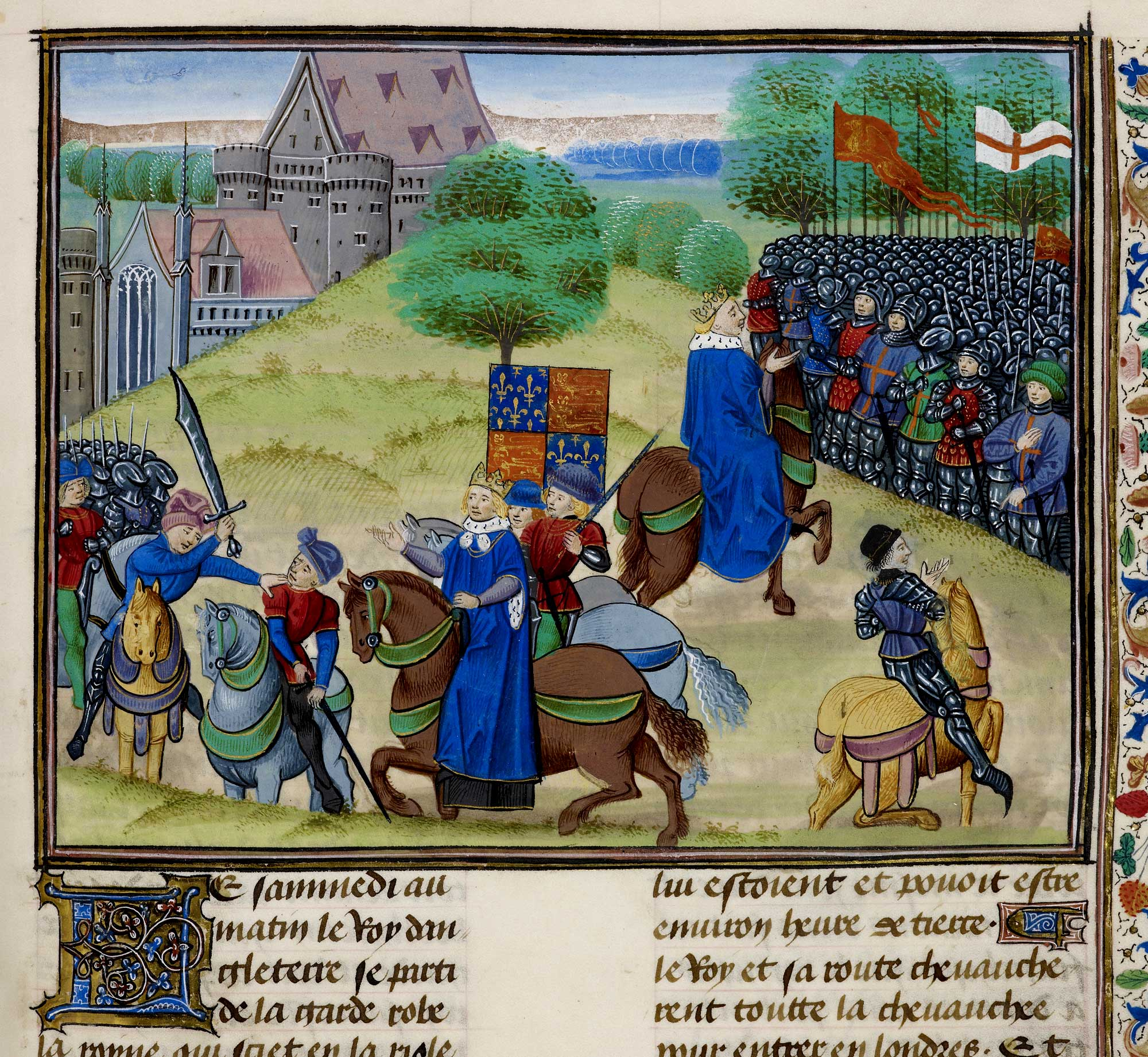
The death of Wat Tyler, illustrated in the Chronicles of Jean Froissart

On 15 June Tyler and his Kentish forces parleyed with King Richard at Smithfield outside London. There, Tyler spoke personally with the king and put forward his demands. At first, the meeting seems to have gone well, with Tyler treating the king in a friendly, if overly familiar, manner, and Richard agreeing the rebels "should have all that he could fairly grant". However, tensions quickly rose.

According to a contemporary chronicler, Tyler acted contemptuously, calling for a flagon of water to rinse his mouth "because of the great heat that he was in" and when he received the water "he rinsed his mouth in a very rude and disgusting fashion before the King's face". Sir John Newton (a servant of the king) insulted Tyler by calling him "the greatest thief and robber in all of Kent". Tyler attacked Newton but was restrained and arrested by the Lord Mayor of London, William Walworth. Tyler then attempted to stab Walworth, who was saved by his armour. Walworth slashed Tyler across the neck and head with his sword, and another of the king's servants, possibly Ralph de Standish, stabbed Tyler again, severely wounding him. Tyler managed to ride 30 yards before he fell from his horse.

In the disorder that followed, Tyler was taken to a hospital for the poor but was tracked down by Walworth, brought back to Smithfield, and by judgment of the mayor publicly beheaded. Tyler's head was placed atop a pole and carried through the city, then displayed on London Bridge. In the wake of Tyler's death, his followers were driven from London and the movement was shattered. Subsequently, Richard II revoked all the concessions he had made to the rebels, and many were hunted down and executed. That effectively ended the revolt.

== In literature and the arts ==
John Gower comments on Tyler in his 14th-century poem Vox Clamantis: "The jay's voice is wild and he has only learnt the art of speaking from the classes with whom the Latin poet is identified." A number of works in the post-medieval period have featured Tyler as protagonist, an early example being the play Wat Tyler and Jack Straw, or, The Mob Reformers (1730) first performed at Bartholomew Fair in 1730. Tyler is represented in Robert Southey's Wat Tyler, A Dramatic Poem (written 1794, published 1813).

The first novel to feature Tyler is Mrs. O'Neill's The Bondman: A Story of the Days of Wat Tyler (1833). He is the protagonist in Pierce Egan the Younger's novel Wat Tyler, or the Rebellion of 1381 (1841), a radical text published at the height of the second phase of the Chartist movement, arguing for republican government in England. A bastardized version of Egan's novel was subsequently published as The Life and Adventures of Wat Tyler: The Good and the Brave (1851). Tyler is the protagonist of the penny dreadful novel Wat Tyler; or, The King and the Apprentice, serialized in The Young Englishman's Journal in 1867. He appears as a main character in William Harrison Ainsworth's Merry England; or, Nobles and Serfs (1874). In Charles Dickens' Bleak House (1853), his name is invoked by Sir Leicester Dedlock as a cautionary example of making concessions to "some person in the lower classes". Dickens also refers to him in the novel Our Mutual Friend. He features as a sympathetic hero in the novel A Dream of John Ball (1888) by William Morris.

Tyler is mentioned in Redburn by Herman Melville and in A Connecticut Yankee in King Arthur's Court by Mark Twain. He features briefly in the historical fiction The Mediation of Ralph Hardelot (1888) by William Minto. The juvenile novel A March on London (1897) by G. A. Henty, illustrated by W.H. Margetson, depicts him briefly as a "sullen and resentful" demagogue. Long Will (1903), a novel by Florence Converse, depicts a meritorious Tyler.

The 1921 play Wat Tyler by Halcott Glover interprets Tyler as a sympathetic protester against feudal tyranny who is incited to violence by John Ball's preaching. Riot at Gravesend (1952), a novel by William Howard Woods, focuses on the combats between the rebels and the authorities. Who Then Was The Gentleman? (1963) is a novel by Charles E. Israel, that renders a courageous and charismatic Tyler. A Summer Storm (1976), a novel by Jane Lane, depicts him as a villain. The novel The Confession of Jack Straw (1991) by Simone Zelitch features Tyler as a central character. The children's novel Fire, Bed, and Bone (1997) by Henrietta Branford has Tyler as one of its characters. Tyler is the principal character in the historical novel Now is the Time (2015) by Melvyn Bragg. Tyler's story is told in an early chapter of La guerre des pauvres (2019; translated as The War of the Poor, 2021) by Éric Vuillard. Tyler is a protagonist in Doom Painting (2026) by A. K. Blakemore.

English composer Alan Bush wrote the biographical opera Wat Tyler, premiering at the Leipzig Opera in 1953. Singer-songwriter Martin Newell references Tyler and the Peasant's Revolt in his song "The Jangling Man" from the 1990 album Number Thirteen, in reference to the poll tax riots. English folk singer-songwriter Frank Turner references Tyler's negotiations at Smithfield in "Sons of Liberty" from the 2009 album Poetry of the Deed, and again mentions Tyler by name in "One Foot Before the Other" from 2011 album England Keep My Bones. Provisional IRA member and hunger striker Bobby Sands references "Wat the Tyler" and the poor men in a prison poem "The Rhythm of Time". A cultural history survey by Stephen Basdeo of Tyler's portrayals in post-medieval literature to the modern period argues that Tyler's tends to appear in popular culture at times of political stress.

The 2026 film The Uprising, directed by Paul Greengrass, dramatizes the events of the Peasants Revolt, with Cosmo Jarvis playing Wat Tyler.

== Tributes ==
A section of the A249 road passing through Maidstone is named "Wat Tyler Way" in his honour. "Tyler's Causeway" running from Newgatestreet Village towards the A1000 in Hertfordshire named for the route taken by some of his followers fleeing the capital following his death. A road on the western edge of Blackheath is called Wat Tyler Road Wat Tyler Country Park in Essex is named after him. Swindon Borough Council's Offices are in Wat Tyler House. A memorial commemorating Wat Tyler and the Great Rising of 1381 was unveiled on 15 July 2015 in Smithfield, London.

== See also ==
- John Ball and Jack Straw, other leaders of the 1381 Peasants' Revolt
- Jack Cade, leader of the 1450 Kentish Revolt
- Michael An Gof, leader of the Cornish rebellion of 1497
- Robert Kett, leader of Kett's Rebellion in 1549 in Norfolk
- Bartholomew Steer, leader of the 1596 Oxfordshire Rebellion
