= Wendy Boase =

Wendy Boase (14 October 1944 – 15 March 1999) born in Melbourne, Australia, was one of the co-founders of the children's publishing company Walker Books. She held the position of editorial director of Walker Books until her death in 1999 from cancer. The Branford Boase Award is in part named after her. Wendy Boase helped Henrietta Branford to write the novel Fire, Bed, and Bone which won the Guardian Children's Fiction Prize. She was also involved with the publication of Lucy Cousin's popular Maisy picture book series for young children.

== Personal life ==
She received a degree in Anglo-Saxon and Middle English from Sydney University. Boase married John Vigurs in 1979.
