= Bibliography of the history of the Black Death =

Bibliography of the Black Death
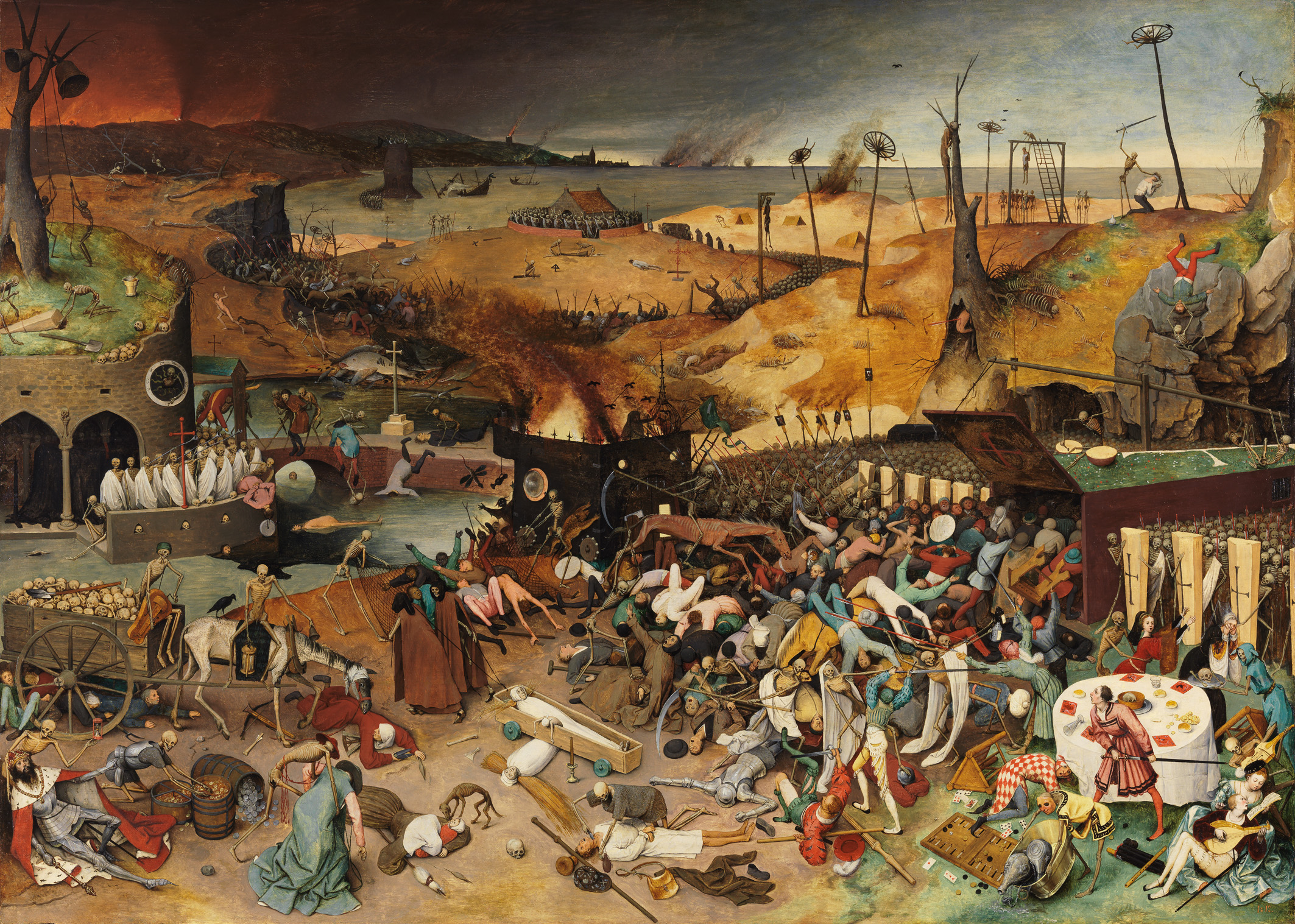
- Subject: The Black Death and the second plague pandemic
- Chronological scope: Late antiquity to the early modern period, centered on 1346–1353
- Geographic scope: Europe, the Middle East, North Africa and Central Asia
- Language: English-language scholarship, including translations
- Arrangement: Thematic
- Citation style: APA 7

The Black Death
- The spread of the Black Death in Europe, North Africa, and West Asia (1346–1353)
- Disease: Plague
- Location: Eurasia and North Africa
- Date: 1346–1353
- Deaths: 25,000,000 – 50,000,000 (estimated)

This is a bibliography of works about the Black Death. This bibliography is limited to history and excludes other disciplines.

The Black Death was a plague pandemic in Europe from 1346 to 1353. It was one of the deadliest pandemics in human history, killing up to 50 million people, roughly 30 to 60 percent of Europe's population, and about a third of the population of the Middle East. The disease was caused by the bacterium Yersinia pestis, which spreads mainly through flea bites, though it can also pass through contact with infected tissues or fluids and, in pneumonic cases, through respiratory droplets.

Bibliography contains academic level English language books (including translations) and journal articles, published mainly post World War II. (Note: Works published before World War II should be limited to areas where there is no significant post World War II books on the subject or when the work in question has significant historical merit.) Book entries may have references to reviews published in academic journals or major newspapers when these could be considered helpful. These reference reviews also function as a resource to find other works on this subject.

Works listed here are cited in the notes or bibliographies of scholarly sources. Each is published by an academic or major trade press, written by a recognized expert, or substantially reviewed in scholarly journals; borderline cases are omitted. A selection of primary sources are included. Many of the books below carry their own bibliographies; see Further reading section for longer ones, and External links section for historical sites and museums.

Citations follow APA style. (Note: Entries are in plain text APA 7 format without templates; templates are used only for reviews and notes.) Book have citations to academic journal or mainstream published reviews when available. For books only partly about the subject, give relevant chapter or section titles where useful and available. Translators of the original-language edition are included when possible. In cases where a title or name has appeared with more than one English spelling, use the most recent published form is used and a footnote documents any earlier title under which the work appeared.

== Background ==
- Campbell, B. M. S. (Ed.). (1991). Before the Black Death: Studies in the 'crisis' of the early fourteenth century. Manchester University Press.
- Duncan-Jones, R. P. (1996). The impact of the Antonine plague. Journal of Roman Archaeology, 9, 108–136. doi:10.1017/s1047759400016524
- Eisenberg, M., & Mordechai, L. (2020). The Justinianic Plague and global pandemics: The making of the plague concept. The American Historical Review, 125(5), 1632–1667. doi:10.1093/ahr/rhaa510
- Elliott, C. P. (2016). The Antonine Plague, climate change and local violence in Roman Egypt. Past & Present, 231(1), 3–31. doi:10.1093/pastj/gtv058
- Harper, K. (2015). Pandemics and passages to late antiquity: Rethinking the plague of c. 249–270 described by Cyprian. Journal of Roman Archaeology, 28, 223–260. doi:10.1017/s1047759415002470
- Harper, K. (2017). The fate of Rome: Climate, disease, and the end of an empire. Princeton University Press. JSTOR j.ctv9b2txr
- Jordan, W. C. (1996). The Great Famine: Northern Europe in the early fourteenth century. Princeton University Press. doi:10.1515/9781400822133
- Keller, M., Spyrou, M. A., Scheib, C. L., Neumann, G. U., Kröpelin, A., Haas-Gebhard, B., Päffgen, B., Haberstroh, J., Ribera i Lacomba, A., Raynaud, C., Cessford, C., Durand, R., Stadler, P., Nägele, K., Bates, J. S., Trautmann, B., Inskip, S. A., Peters, J., Robb, J. E., ... Krause, J. (2019). Ancient Yersinia pestis genomes from across Western Europe reveal early diversification during the First Pandemic (541–750). Proceedings of the National Academy of Sciences, 116(25), 12363–12372. doi:10.1073/pnas.1820447116
- Kershaw, I. (1973). The Great Famine and agrarian crisis in England 1315–1322. Past and Present, 59(1), 3–50. doi:10.1093/past/59.1.3
- Little, L. K. (Ed.). (2006). Plague and the end of antiquity: The pandemic of 541–750. Cambridge University Press. doi:10.1017/cbo9780511812934
- Mordechai, L., & Eisenberg, M. (2019). Rejecting catastrophe: The case of the Justinianic Plague. Past & Present, 244(1), 3–50. doi:10.1093/pastj/gtz009
- Mordechai, L., Eisenberg, M., Newfield, T. P., Izdebski, A., Kay, J. E., & Poinar, H. (2019). The Justinianic Plague: An inconsequential pandemic? Proceedings of the National Academy of Sciences, 116(51), 25546–25554. doi:10.1073/pnas.1903797116
- Rasmussen, S., Allentoft, M. E., Nielsen, K., Orlando, L., Sikora, M., Sjögren, K.-G., Pedersen, A. G., Schubert, M., Van Dam, A., Kapel, C. M. O., Nielsen, H. B., Brunak, S., Avetisyan, P., Epimakhov, A., Khalyapin, M. V., Gnuni, A., Kriiska, A., Lasak, I., Metspalu, M., ... Willerslev, E. (2015). Early divergent strains of Yersinia pestis in Eurasia 5,000 years ago. Cell, 163(3), 571–582. doi:10.1016/j.cell.2015.10.009
- Rosen, W. (2007). Justinian's flea: Plague, empire, and the birth of Europe. Viking.
- Sarris, P. (2002). The Justinianic plague: Origins and effects. Continuity and Change, 17(2), 169–182. doi:10.1017/s0268416002004137
- Slavin, P. (2011). The Great Bovine Pestilence and its economic and environmental consequences in England and Wales, 1318–50. The Economic History Review, 65(4), 1239–1266. doi:10.1111/j.1468-0289.2011.00625.x
- Slavin, P. (2013). Market failure during the Great Famine in England and Wales (1315–1317). Past & Present, 222(1), 9–49. doi:10.1093/pastj/gtt025
- Stathakopoulos, D. C. (2004). Famine and pestilence in the late Roman and early Byzantine Empire: A systematic survey of subsistence crises and epidemics. Ashgate.
- Wagner, D. M., Klunk, J., Harbeck, M., Devault, A., Waglechner, N., Sahl, J. W., Enk, J., Birdsell, D. N., Kuch, M., Lumibao, C., Poinar, D., Pearson, T., Fourment, M., Golding, B., Riehm, J. M., Earn, D. J. D., DeWitte, S., Rouillard, J.-M., Grupe, G., ... Poinar, H. (2014). Yersinia pestis and the Plague of Justinian 541–543 AD: A genomic analysis. The Lancet Infectious Diseases, 14(4), 319–326. doi:10.1016/s1473-3099(13)70323-2

== General histories ==
- Aberth, J. (2001). From the brink of the apocalypse: Confronting famine, war, plague, and death in the later Middle Ages. Routledge.
- Aberth, J. (2011). Plagues in world history. Rowman & Littlefield. doi:10.5771/9781442207967
- Aberth, J. (2021). The Black Death: A new history of the great mortality in Europe, 1347–1500. Oxford University Press.
- Belich, J. (2022). The world the plague made: The Black Death and the rise of Europe. Princeton University Press. JSTOR j.ctv287skgm
- Benedictow, O. J. (2021). The complete history of the Black Death. Boydell Press. doi:10.1017/9781787449312
- Byrne, J. P. (2004). The Black Death. Greenwood. doi:10.5040/9798400619557
- Byrne, J. P. (2006). Daily life during the Black Death. Greenwood. doi:10.5040/9798400636721
- Byrne, J. P. (2012). Encyclopedia of the Black Death. ABC-CLIO. doi:10.5040/9798216024781
- Cantor, N. F. (2001). In the wake of the plague: The Black Death and the world it made. Free Press.
- Gottfried, R. S. (1983). The Black Death: Natural and human disaster in medieval Europe. Free Press.
- Green, M. H. (Ed.). (2015). Pandemic disease in the medieval world: Rethinking the Black Death. Arc Humanities Press. JSTOR j.ctvmd83jc
- Harper, K. (2021). Plagues upon the Earth: Disease and the course of human history. Princeton University Press. doi:10.1515/9780691224725
- Harrison, M. (2012). Contagion: How commerce has spread disease. Yale University Press.
- Herlihy, D. (1997). The Black Death and the transformation of the West (S. K. Cohn Jr., Ed.). Harvard University Press. JSTOR j.ctvjghwgp
- Kelly, J. (2005). The great mortality: An intimate history of the Black Death, the most devastating plague of all time. HarperCollins.
- McNeill, W. H. (1976). Plagues and peoples. Anchor Press/Doubleday.
- Slack, P. (2012). Plague: A very short introduction. Oxford University Press. doi:10.1093/actrade/9780199589548.001.0001
- Tuchman, B. W. (1978). A distant mirror: The calamitous 14th century. Alfred A. Knopf.
- Ziegler, P. (1969). The Black Death. John Day.

=== Regional studies ===
- Bowsky, W. M. (1964). The impact of the Black Death upon Sienese government and society. Speculum, 39(1), 1–34. JSTOR 2850126
- Carmichael, A. G. (1986). Plague and the poor in Renaissance Florence. Cambridge University Press.
- Dols, M. W. (1977). The Black Death in the Middle East. Princeton University Press.
- Hatcher, J. (2008). The Black Death: An intimate history. Weidenfeld & Nicolson.
- Mengel, D. C. (2011). A plague on Bohemia? Mapping the Black Death. Past & Present, 211(1), 3–34. doi:10.1093/pastj/gtq069
- Platt, C. (1996). King Death: The Black Death and its aftermath in late-medieval England. UCL Press.
- Shrewsbury, J. F. D. (1970). A history of bubonic plague in the British Isles. Cambridge University Press.
- Varlik, N. (2015). Plague and empire in the early modern Mediterranean world: The Ottoman experience, 1347–1600. Cambridge University Press. doi:10.1017/cbo9781139004046
- Wray, S. K. (2009). Communities and crisis: Bologna during the Black Death. Brill. doi:10.1163/ej.9789004176348.i-300

== Social history ==
- Bailey, M. (2021). After the Black Death: Economy, society, and the law in fourteenth-century England. Oxford University Press. doi:10.1093/oso/9780198857884.001.0001
- Campbell, B. M. S. (2016). The great transition: Climate, disease and society in the late-medieval world. Cambridge University Press. doi:10.1017/cbo9781139031110
- Hatcher, J. (1977). Plague, population and the English economy, 1348–1530. Macmillan. doi:10.1007/978-1-349-03149-8
- Hatcher, J. (1994). England in the aftermath of the Black Death. Past and Present, 144(1), 3–35. doi:10.1093/past/144.1.3

=== Jews and the Black Death ===
- Barzilay, T. (2016). Early accusations of well poisoning against Jews: Medieval reality or historiographical fiction? Medieval Encounters, 22(5), 517–539. doi:10.1163/15700674-12342236
- Barzilay, T. (2022). Poisoned wells: Accusations, persecution, and minorities in medieval Europe, 1321–1422. University of Pennsylvania Press. doi:10.9783/9780812298222
- Cohn, S. K. (2007). The Black Death and the burning of Jews. Past & Present, 196(1), 3–36. doi:10.1093/pastj/gtm005
- Colet, A., Muntané i Santiveri, J. X., Ruíz Ventura, J., Saula, O., Subirà de Galdàcano, M. E., & Jáuregui, C. (2014). The Black Death and its consequences for the Jewish community in Tàrrega: Lessons from history and archeology. The Medieval Globe, 1(1), 63–96. doi:10.17302/tmg.1-1.4
- Einbinder, S. L. (2018). After the Black Death: Plague and commemoration among Iberian Jews. University of Pennsylvania Press. doi:10.9783/9780812295214
- Finley, T., & Koyama, M. (2018). Plague, politics, and pogroms: The Black Death, the rule of law, and the persecution of Jews in the Holy Roman Empire. The Journal of Law and Economics, 61(2), 253–277. doi:10.1086/699016
- Foa, A. (2000). The Jews of Europe after the Black Death (A. Grover, Trans.). University of California Press.
- Jedwab, R., Johnson, N. D., & Koyama, M. (2019). Negative shocks and mass persecutions: Evidence from the Black Death. Journal of Economic Growth, 24(4), 345–395. doi:10.1007/s10887-019-09167-1
- Nirenberg, D. (1996). Communities of violence: Persecution of minorities in the Middle Ages. Princeton University Press.
- Voigtländer, N., & Voth, H.-J. (2012). Persecution perpetuated: The medieval origins of anti-Semitic violence in Nazi Germany. The Quarterly Journal of Economics, 127(3), 1339–1392. doi:10.1093/qje/qjs019

== Medicine and science ==
- Aberth, J. (2021). Doctoring the Black Death: Medieval Europe's medical response to plague. Rowman & Littlefield. doi:10.5040/9798881821302
- Bos, K. I., Schuenemann, V. J., Golding, G. B., Burbano, H. A., Waglechner, N., Coombes, B. K., McPhee, J. B., DeWitte, S. N., Meyer, M., Schmedes, S., Wood, J., Earn, D. J. D., Herring, D. A., Bauer, P., Poinar, H. N., & Krause, J. (2011). A draft genome of Yersinia pestis from victims of the Black Death. Nature, 478(7370), 506–510. doi:10.1038/nature10549
- Cohn, S. K., Jr. (2002a). The Black Death: End of a paradigm. The American Historical Review, 107(3), 703–738. doi:10.1086/532493
- Cohn, S. K., Jr. (2002b). The Black Death transformed: Disease and culture in early Renaissance Europe. Arnold.
- Dean, K. R., Krauer, F., Walløe, L., Lingjærde, O. C., Bramanti, B., Stenseth, N. C., & Schmid, B. V. (2018). Human ectoparasites and the spread of plague in Europe during the Second Pandemic. Proceedings of the National Academy of Sciences, 115(6), 1304–1309. doi:10.1073/pnas.1715640115
- Green, M. H. (2020). The four Black Deaths. The American Historical Review, 125(5), 1601–1631. doi:10.1093/ahr/rhaa511
- Haensch, S., Bianucci, R., Signoli, M., Rajerison, M., Schultz, M., Kacki, S., Vermunt, M., Weston, D. A., Hurst, D., Achtman, M., Carniel, E., & Bramanti, B. (2010). Distinct clones of Yersinia pestis caused the Black Death. PLoS Pathogens, 6(10), e1001134. doi:10.1371/journal.ppat.1001134
- Klunk, J., Vilgalys, T. P., Demeure, C. E., Cheng, X., Shiratori, M., Madej, J., Beau, R., Elli, D., Patino, M. I., Redfern, R., DeWitte, S. N., Gamble, J. A., Boldsen, J. L., Carmichael, A., Varlik, N., Eaton, K., Grenier, J.-C., Golding, G. B., Devault, A., ... Barreiro, L. B. (2022). Evolution of immune genes is associated with the Black Death. Nature, 611(7935), 312–319. doi:10.1038/s41586-022-05349-x
- Nutton, V. (Ed.). (2008). Pestilential complexities: Understanding medieval plague. Wellcome Trust Centre for the History of Medicine at UCL.
- Scott, S., & Duncan, C. J. (2001). Biology of plagues: Evidence from historical populations. Cambridge University Press. doi:10.1017/cbo9780511542527
- Spyrou, M. A., Musralina, L., Gnecchi Ruscone, G. A., Kocher, A., Borbone, P.-G., Khartanovich, V. I., Buzhilova, A., Djansugurova, L., Bos, K. I., Kühnert, D., Haak, W., Slavin, P., & Krause, J. (2022). The source of the Black Death in fourteenth-century central Eurasia. Nature, 606(7915), 718–724. doi:10.1038/s41586-022-04800-3
- Theilmann, J., & Cate, F. (2007). A plague of plagues: The problem of plague diagnosis in medieval England. The Journal of Interdisciplinary History, 37(3), 371–393. doi:10.1162/jinh.2007.37.3.371
- Twigg, G. (1984). The Black Death: A biological reappraisal. Batsford.

== Primary sources ==
- Aberth, J. (2005). The Black Death: The great mortality of 1348–1350: A brief history with documents. Palgrave Macmillan. doi:10.1007/978-1-137-10349-9
- Horrox, R. (Trans. & Ed.). (1994). The Black Death. Manchester University Press.
- Marcus, J. R. (1999). The Jew in the medieval world: A source book, 315–1791. Hebrew Union College Press. JSTOR j.ctvd58td4 (Original work published 1938)

== See also ==
- Black Death
- Black Death in England
- Consequences of the Black Death
- Crisis of the late Middle Ages
- Danse Macabre
- Flagellant
- Great Famine of 1315–1317
- List of epidemics and pandemics
- Persecution of Jews during the Black Death
- Plague of Justinian
- Second plague pandemic
- Third plague pandemic
