= St John's Fields =

Medieval fields near London

St John's Fields, London, were fields owned by the church of St John of Clerkenwell and were used as a gathering point outside the city walls of medieval London.

In 1381 the rebels involved with the Peasants' Revolt marched to the fields to meet Wat Tyler. On 1 March 1461 Edward Plantaganent 4th Duke of York and Earl of March was declared King there and assumed the title of Edward IV, the first Yorkist King of England.

The fields are now built over and form part of Clerkenwell.
