= John Ball Primary School =

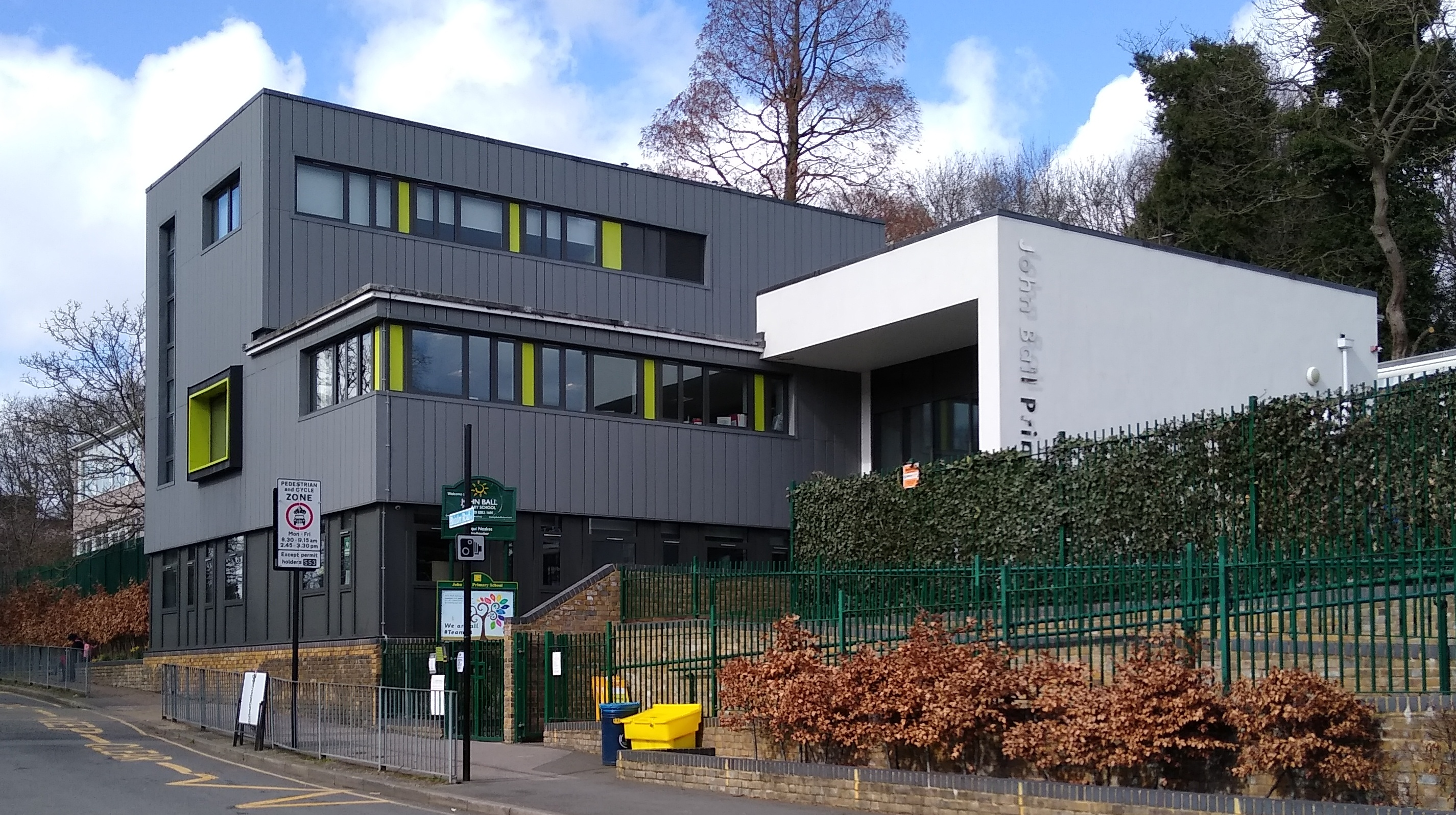

Location
- Southvale Road; Blackheath, London, SE3 0TP; England
- Coordinates: 51.4661°N 0.0057°E

Information
- Type: Community primary school
- Motto: Achievement, ambition and progress for all...
- Established: 1953
- Local authority: Lewisham London Borough Council
- Department for Education URN: 100709 Tables
- Ofsted: Reports
- Head teacher: Jacqui Noakes
- Gender: Mixed
- Age range: 3–11
- Enrolment: 636 (2019)
- Capacity: 670
- Website: www.johnball.lewisham.sch.uk

John Ball Primary School is a 3–11 mixed, community primary school in Blackheath, London, England. It is named after the 14th century Lollard priest, John Ball, who preached to participants in the Peasants' Revolt on Blackheath.

== History ==
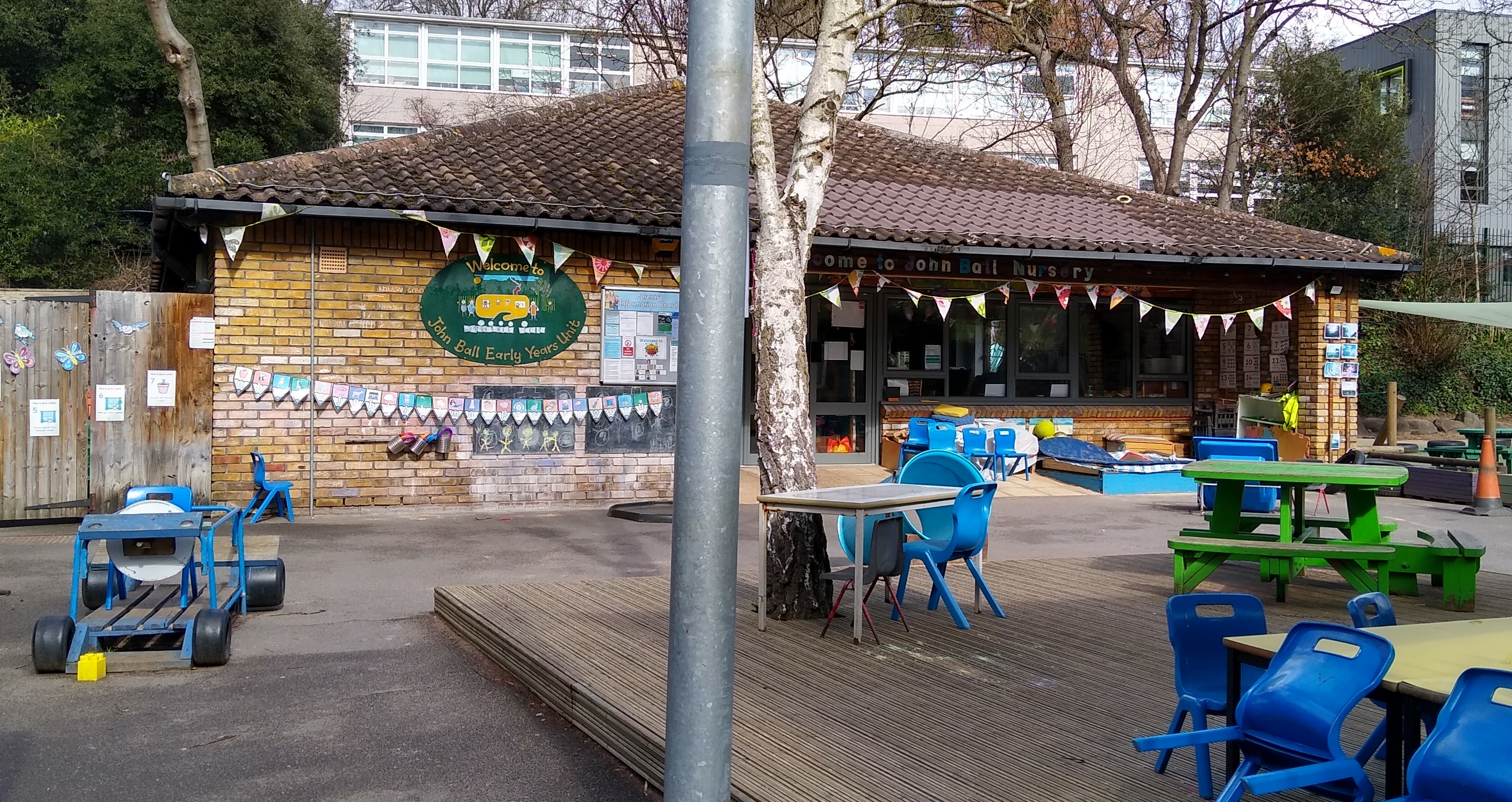
Early Years unit

The main building was opened in 1953, and a purpose-built Early Years Unit was added in early 2001. In 2010, a new Music block was opened, and a new Year 6 block opened in 2011.

In 2014/5 a £4.5M building project was completed to permanently expand the school to 3 forms of entry. This involved the building of a new admin and central facilities block, a wing of 5 new classrooms, the extension of a new classroom to the Early Years building. The outdoor play space, nursery class, and small hall were also refurbished. The school also brought in a bulge class of reception children in Sept 2015, meaning a 120 pupil year group.

== Uniform ==
John Ball Primary School is unusual among British schools for not having a required school uniform. However, students can purchase sweatshirts, polo shirts, tee shirts, book bags, and gym bags with the school logo on.

== Demographics ==
Around 44% of students are white British. Approximately 20% of pupils speak English as an additional language and 18% of pupils were eligible for free school meals. In 2010, 20.4% of pupils had special educational needs.

== Notable alumni ==
- Jude Law, actor
- Dominic Cooper, actor
