= A Dream of John Ball =

1888 novel by William Morris

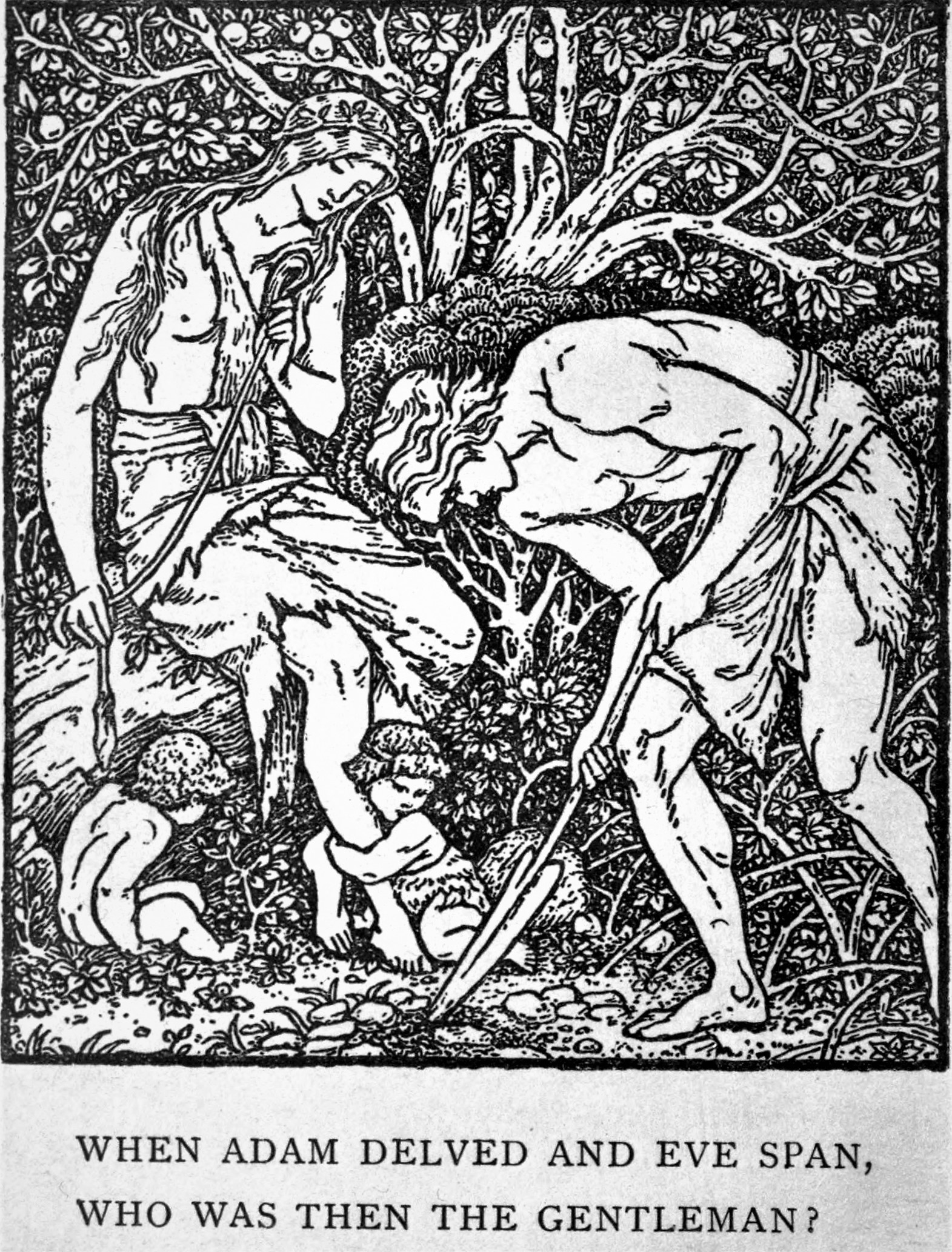
- Burne-Jones' illustration which was used in the 1888 edition.
- Author: William Morris
- Illustrator: Edward Burne-Jones (frontispiece)
- Language: English
- Genre: Historical fantasy Science fiction Time travel
- Published: 1888
- Publication place: United Kingdom
- Media type: Print (Hardcover & Paperback) & E-book
- Pages: c. 300 pp (may change depending on the publisher and the size of the text)

A Dream of John Ball (1888) is a novel by English author William Morris about the Great Revolt of 1381, conventionally called "the Peasants' Revolt". It features the rebel priest John Ball, who was accused of being a Lollard. He is famed for his question "When Adam delved and Eve span, who was then the gentleman?"

== Depiction of the Middle Ages ==
Morris draws on Froissart for information on the fourteenth century, but has a different attitude towards the revolting peasants from the chronicler who, Sir Walter Scott once remarked, had "marvelous little sympathy" for the "villain churls." Morris was also aware of interpretations of the Peasants' Revolt as representing a socialist tradition. In 1884 he had written an article in which he stated that "we need make no mistake about the cause for which Wat Tyler and his worthier associate John Ball fell; they were fighting against the fleecing then in fashion, viz.; serfdom or villeinage, which was already beginning to wane before the advance of the industrial gilds."

The novel describes a dream and time travel encounter between the medieval and modern worlds, thus contrasting the ethics of medieval and contemporary culture. A time-traveller tells Ball of the decline of feudalism and the rise of the Industrial Revolution. Ball realizes that in the nineteenth century his hopes for an egalitarian society have yet to be fulfilled. When Ball asks why his dreams of an egalitarian society have not come to pass, the narrator replies, "Now I tell thee that in the days to come poor men shall be able to become lords and masters and do-nothings; and oft will it be seen that they shall do so; and it shall be even for that cause that their eyes shall be blinded to the robbing of themselves by others, because they shall hope in their souls that they may each live to rob others: and this shall be the very safeguard of all rule and law in those days.”

A parallel can be drawn with the novel's close contemporary—A Connecticut Yankee in King Arthur's Court (1889) by Mark Twain. Unlike Twain's novel, which depicted early-Medieval England as a violent and chaotic Dark Age, Morris depicts the Middle Ages in a positive light, seeing it as a golden, if brief, period when peasants were prosperous and happy and guilds protected workers from exploitation. This positive portrayal of the Medieval period is a recurring theme in Morris' literary and artistic oeuvre, from the largely pastoral and craftsman based economies of the prose romances, to his similar dream vision of Britain's utopian future, News from Nowhere (1890).

== Publication history ==
The story was originally published in serial format in the socialist weekly The Commonweal, November 13, 1886 - January 22, 1887. It appeared in book form in 1888, alongside the short story "A King's Lesson" (also originally published in The Commonweal, September 18, 1886). The book includes an illustration by Morris' friend Sir Edward Coley Burne-Jones. Burne-Jones (who did not share Morris's socialist views) depicts Adam digging and Eve spinning with two infants at her feet.

Kelmscott, Morris's private press, published, in 1892, A Dream of John Ball and A King's Lesson. Burne-Jones' illustration is used as the frontispiece.

== See also ==
- A Connecticut Yankee in King Arthur's Court (1889) by Mark Twain
- Looking Backward (1888), by Edward Bellamy
