= The Fated Sky =

1996 novel by Henrietta Branford

- First edition
- Author: Henrietta Branford
- Cover artist: Peter Sutton
- Language: English
- Series: N/A
- Subject: Vikings -- Fiction
- Genre: Historical fiction
- Publisher: Hodder Children's Books
- Publication date: 1996
- Publication place: UK
- Media type: Book
- Pages: 151
- ISBN: 978-0-340-66102-4
- OCLC: 37988574

The Fated Sky is the title of a historical novel for young adults by English author Henrietta Branford, first published in Great Britain in 1996 by Hodder Children's Books. Set in Norway and Iceland during the Viking period, it depicts the stirring but bleak existence of Dark Age Europeans at a time of insecurity and constant threat from raiders. The story follows a young woman called Ran from the time she loses her mother in a wolf attack, and a subsequent attempt to kill her as a human sacrifice, to her escape with a blind harper, Toki, to a new life in Iceland. Even there however the threat of sudden violence hangs over small and isolated farming communities. The book does not dwell on bloodshed but is honest about the hardship, unpredictability and cruelty of the period, showing even sympathetic central characters as not immune to painful death. Moral choices are also at times difficult.

The book was noted as one of the ten best "romance" novels for young adults in 2000.
