= Economic consequences of population decline =

Demographic statistical analysis

Population decline has many potential effects on individual and national economy. The single best gauge of economic success is growth in GDP per capita, not GDP. GDP per capita is an approximate indicator of average living standards, for individual prosperity. Therefore, whether population decline has a positive or negative economic impact on a country's citizens depends on the rate of growth of GDP per capita, or alternatively, GDP growth relative to the rate of decline in the population.

== Background ==
The simplest expression for the size of a country's economy is

GDP = total population × GDP/person

GDP/person is also known as GDP per capita or per capita GDP. This term is a simple definition of economic productivity as well as individual standard of living.

The real change in total GDP is defined as the change in population plus the real change in GDP/capita. The table below shows that historically, for every major region of the world, both of these have been positive. This explains the enormous economic growth around the world brought on by the industrial revolution. However, the two columns on the right also show that, for every region, population growth in the future will decline and, in some regions, go negative. The table also shows that two major economies, Japan and Germany, may face the same conditions.

Average annual growth rates (%) of population, per capita GDP, and GDP for various time periods
Region	1820–2010			2015–20	2045–50
Region	Pop	GDP/cap	GDP	Pop	Pop
Western Europe	0.6	1.4	2.0	0.4	−0.2
Eastern Europe	0.6	1.2	1.8	−0.1	−0.4
Former USSR	0.9	1.1	2.0	na	na
Western offshoots*	1.8	1.6	3.5		
Northern America				0.8	0.2
Latin America & the Caribbean	1.8	1.3	3.0	0.9	0.2
Asia	0.9	1.3	2.2	0.9	0.2
Africa	1.4	0.8	2.1	2.7	1.6
World	1.0	1.3	2.3	1.1	0.5
Germany				0.3	−0.3
Japan				−0.3	−0.7

* Western offshoots are USA, Canada, Australia, and New Zealand

Because

GDP = total population × GDP/person,

as populations grow more slowly, assuming no changes in growth of GDP/person, GDP will also grow more slowly.

== If per capita GDP increase is less than the decrease in total population ==
The equation above shows that if the decline in total population is not matched by an equal or greater increase in productivity (GDP/capita), and if that condition continues from one calendar quarter to the next, it follows that a country would experience a decline in GDP, known as an economic recession.

The possible impacts of a declining population that leads to permanent recession are:

1. Decline in basic services and infrastructure. If the GDP of a community declines, there is less demand for basic services such as hotels, restaurants and shops. The employment in these sectors then suffers. A falling GDP also implies a falling tax base that would support basic infrastructure such as police, fire and electricity. The government may be forced to abandon some of this infrastructure, like bus and railroad lines, and combine school districts, hospitals and even townships in order to maintain some level of economies of scale.
2. Rise in dependency ratio. Dependency ratio is the ratio of those not in the labor force (the dependent part ages 0 to 14 and 65+) and those in the labor force (the productive part ages 15 to 64). It is used to measure the pressure on the productive population. Population decline caused by sub-replacement fertility rates means that every generation will be smaller than the one before it. Combined with longer life spans the result can be an increase in the dependency ratio which can put increased economic pressure on the work force. With the exception of Africa, dependency ratios are forecast to increase everywhere in the world by the end of the 21st century.
3. Crisis in end of life care for the elderly. A falling population caused by sub-replacement fertility and/or longer life spans means that the growing size of the retired population relative to the size of the labor force, known as population ageing, may cause a crisis in end of life care for the elderly because of insufficient caregivers for them.
4. Difficulties in funding entitlement programs. Population decline can impact the funding for programs for retirees if the ratio of working age population to the retired population declines. For example, in Japan, there were 5.8 workers for every retiree in 1990 vs 2.3 in 2017 and a projected 1.4 in 2050. Also, according to new research (2019) China's main state pension fund will run out of money by 2035 as the available workforce shrinks due to effects of that country's one-child policy. With the exception of Africa, this trend prevails, to a greater or lesser extent, everywhere else in the world.
5. Decline in military strength. Big countries, with large populations, assuming technology and other things being equal, tend to have greater military power than small countries with small populations. In addition to lowering working age population, population decline will also lower the military age population, and therefore military power.
6. Decline in innovation. A falling population also lowers the rate of innovation, since change tends to come from younger workers and entrepreneurs.
7. Strain on mental health. Population decline may harm a population's mental health (or morale) if it causes permanent recession and a concomitant decline in basic services and infrastructure.
8. Deflation. A recent (2014) study found substantial deflationary pressures from Japan's ageing population.
9. Unemployment. A Slovenian study from 2015 found that population ageing leads to higher rates of unemployment and less entrepreneurial activity.

== If GDP per capita increase is greater than population decrease ==
The single best gauge of economic success is growth in GDP per person, not total GDP. GDP per person, also known as GDP per capita, is a simple definition of individual economic productivity as well as a rough proxy for average living standards, for individual prosperity.

If a nation can focus on increasing the productivity of its citizens, that improvement in economic output will help increase its GDP. It will also increase the average standard of living of its people because higher economic output per person usually produces higher household incomes. By increasing its GDP per capita, a country can therefore increase its average living standard even though its population growth is low or even negative, and if it can increase GDP per capita faster than its population is declining, it can also increase its total GDP.

Consider for example Japan. As the table below shows, even though Japan's population declined 2.0% during the period 2012-2022, its per capita GDP, a rough approximation of the overall productivity of the Japanese people, rose by about 7.5%, a much greater increase than the 2.0% decrease in its population. As a result its GDP still grew by 4.7%, and the increase in GDP per capita produced a higher standard of living for the Japanese people.

	2012	2022	% chg
Population (millions)	127.6	125.1	-2.0
GDP/Capita (thousands 2015 US$)	33.5	36.0	7.5
GDP (trillions 2015 US$)	4.3	4.5	4.7

The UN projects that Japan's population decline will accelerate to about −0.7% per year in the 2040–2045 time period. This means that for Japan's GDP to grow during that period, per capita GDP growth must be greater than 0.7% per year.

One analysis of data for forty countries shows that while low fertility will indeed challenge government programs and very low fertility undermines living standards, moderately low fertility and population decline favor the broader material standard of living.

== See also ==
- Dependency ratio
- Pensions crisis
