= Consequences of the Black Death =

Aftermath of the pandemic

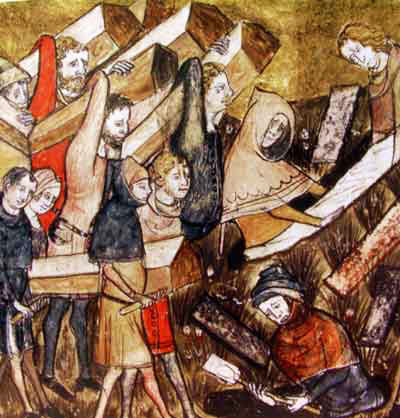
Citizens of Tournai bury plague victims. Detail of a miniature from "The Chronicles of Gilles Li Muisis" (1272–1352). Bibliothèque royale de Belgique, MS 13076–77, f. 24v.

The Black Death peaked in Europe between 1348 and 1350, with an estimated third of the continent's population ultimately succumbing to the disease. Often simply referred to as "The Plague", the Black Death had both immediate and long-term effects on human population across the world as one of the most devastating pandemics in human history, including a series of biological, social, economic, political and religious upheavals that had profound effects on the course of world history, especially European history. Symptoms of the Bubonic Plague included painful and enlarged or swollen lymph nodes, headaches, chills, fatigue, vomiting, and fevers, and within 3 to 5 days, 80% of the victims would be dead. Historians estimate that it reduced the total world population from 475 million to between 350 and 375 million. In most parts of Europe, it took nearly 80 years for population sizes to recover, and in some areas, it took more than 150 years.

From the perspective of many of the survivors, the effect of the plague may have been ultimately favourable, as the massive reduction of the workforce meant their labour was suddenly in higher demand. R. H. Hilton has argued that the English peasants who survived found their situation to be much improved. For many Europeans, the 15th century was a golden age of prosperity and new opportunities. The land was plentiful, wages were high and serfdom had all but disappeared. A century later, as population growth resumed, the lower classes once again faced deprivation and famine.

== Death toll ==
Figures for the death toll vary widely by area and from source to source, and estimates are frequently revised as historical research brings new discoveries to light. Most scholars estimate that the Black Death killed up to 75 million people in the 14th century, at a time when the entire world population was still less than 500 million. Even where the historical record is considered reliable, only rough estimates of the total number of deaths from the plague are possible.

=== Europe ===
Europe suffered an especially significant death toll from the plague. Modern estimates range between roughly one third and one half of the total European population in the five-year period of 1347 to 1351 died during which the most severely-affected areas may have lost up to 80% of the population. Contemporary chronicler Jean Froissart estimated the toll to be one-third, which modern scholars consider less an accurate assessment than an allusion to the Book of Revelation meant to suggest the scope of the plague. Deaths were not evenly distributed across Europe, and some areas were affected very little, but others were all but entirely depopulated.

The Black Death hit the culture of towns and cities disproportionately hard although rural areas, where most of the population lived at the time, were also significantly affected. Larger cities were the worst off, as population densities and close living quarters made disease transmission easier. Cities were also strikingly filthy, infested with lice, fleas, and rats, and subject to diseases caused by malnutrition and poor hygiene. The population of the city of Florence was reduced from between 110,000 and 120,000 inhabitants in 1338 to 50,000 in 1351. In the cities of Hamburg and Bremen, 60–70% of the inhabitants died. In Provence, Dauphiné, and Normandy, historians observe a decrease of 60% of fiscal hearths. In some regions, two thirds of the population was annihilated. In the town of Givry, in the Bourgogne region of France, the local friar, who used to note 28–29 funerals a year, recorded 649 deaths in 1348, half of them in September. About half the population of Perpignan died over the course of several months (only two of the eight physicians survived the plague). Over 60% of Norway's population died between 1348 and 1350. London may have lost two thirds of its population during the 1348–49 outbreak; England as a whole may have lost 70% of its population, which declined from 7 million before the plague to 2 million in 1400. A study by archaeologist and historian Scott C. Lomax suggested that mortality in Nottingham, England, was approximately 60%.

Some places, including the Kingdom of Poland, parts of Hungary, the Brabant region, Hainaut, and Limbourg (in modern Belgium), as well as Santiago de Compostela, were unaffected for unknown reasons. Some historians have assumed that the presence of resistant blood groups in the local population helped them resist infection, but the regions were touched by the second plague outbreak in 1360–1363 (the "little mortality") and later during the numerous resurgences of the plague (in 1366–1369, 1374–75, 1400, 1407 etc.). Other areas escaping the plague were isolated in mountainous regions such as the Pyrenees.

All social classes were affected, but the lower classes, living together in unhealthy places, were most vulnerable. Alfonso XI of Castile was the highest-ranking European monarch to die from the plague. Joan II of Navarre, daughter of Louis X of France and Margaret of Burgundy, also died. Peter IV of Aragon lost his wife, Eleanor, as well as his daughter and a niece in six months. Joan of England, daughter of Edward III, died in Bordeaux on her way to Castile to marry Alfonso's son Pedro. The Byzantine emperor John VI Kantakouzenos lost one of his sons, while in the France, Bonne of Luxembourg, the wife of the future John II of France, died. Simeon of Moscow, his two sons, and his brother likely died of the plague, along with Theognostus, the head of the Russian Church.

=== Asia ===
Estimates of the demographic effect of the plague in Asia are based on population figures during the time and estimates of the disease's toll on population centers. The most severe outbreak of plague, in the Chinese province of Hubei in 1334, claimed up to 80% of the population. China had several epidemics and famines from 1200 to the 1350s and its population decreased from an estimated 125 million to 65 million in the late 14th century.

The precise demographic effect of the disease in the Middle East is very difficult to calculate. Mortality was particularly high in rural areas, including significant areas of Gaza and Syria. Many rural people fled, leaving their fields and crops, and entire rural provinces are recorded as being totally depopulated. Surviving records in some cities reveal a devastating number of deaths. The 1348 outbreak in Gaza left an estimated 10,000 people dead, and Aleppo recorded a death rate of 500 per day during the same year. In Damascus, at the disease's peak in September and October 1348, a thousand deaths were recorded every day, with overall mortality estimated at between 25 and 38 percent. Syria had lost a total of 400,000 people when the epidemic subsided, in March 1349. In contrast to some higher mortality estimates in Asia and Europe, scholars such as John Fields of Trinity College, Dublin, believe the mortality rate in the Middle East to have been less than one third of the total population, with higher rates in selected areas. An Estimate by Dols (Princeton University, 1977), estimates a mortality rate of around 50% in Egypt and 33.3% throughout the Middle East.

== Social, environmental, and economic effects ==
Because 14th-century healers were at a loss to explain the cause of the Black Death, many Europeans believed supernatural forces, earthquakes, and malicious conspiracies were credible explanations for the plague's emergence. No one in the 14th century considered rat control a way to ward off the plague, and people began to believe that only God's anger could produce such horrific displays of suffering and death. Giovanni Boccaccio, an Italian writer and poet of the era, questioned whether it was sent by God for their correction, or if it came through the influence of the heavenly bodies. Christians accused Jews of poisoning public water supplies and alleged that Jews were making an effort to ruin European civilization. The spreading of those rumours led to the complete destruction of entire Jewish towns. In February 1349, 2,000 Jews were murdered in Strasbourg. In August that year, the Jewish communities of Mainz and Cologne were murdered.

Where government authorities were concerned, most monarchs instituted measures that prohibited exports of foodstuffs, condemned black market speculators, set price controls on grain and outlawed large-scale fishing. At best, those proved mostly unenforceable; at worst, they contributed to a continental downward spiral. The hardest-hit lands, like England, were unable to buy grain abroad from France because of the prohibition and from most of the rest of the grain producers because of crop failures from shortage of labour. Any grain that could be shipped was eventually taken by pirates or looters to be sold on the black market. Meanwhile, many of the largest countries, most notably England and Scotland, had been at war, using up much of their treasury which exacerbated inflation. In 1337, on the eve of the first wave of the Black Death, England and France went to war in what would become known as the Hundred Years' War. Malnutrition, poverty, disease and hunger, coupled with war, growing inflation and other economic concerns, made Europe in the mid-14th century ripe for tragedy.

The historian Walter Scheidel contends that waves of plague following the initial outbreak of the Black Death had a levelling effect, which changed the ratio of land to labour by reducing the value of the former and boosting that of the latter, which lowered economic inequality by making landowners and employers less well-off and improved the lot of the workers: "the observed improvement in living standards of the laboring population was rooted in the suffering and premature death of tens of millions over the course of several generations". The levelling effect was reversed by a "demographic recovery that resulted in renewed population pressure". On the other hand, in the quarter-century after the Black Death, many labourers, artisans, and craftsmen, those living from money-wages alone, suffer a reduction in real incomes in England from rampant inflation. In 1357, a third of property in London was unused because of a severe outbreak in 1348–49. However, for reasons still debated, population levels declined after the Black Death's first outbreak until around 1420 and did not begin to rise again until 1470 and so the initial Black Death event on its own does not entirely provide a satisfactory explanation to that extended period of decline in prosperity. See medieval demography for a more complete treatment of this issue and current theories on why improvements in living standards took longer to evolve.

The trade disruptions in the Mongol Empire caused by the Black Death was one of the reasons for its collapse.

=== Peasantry ===
The great population loss brought favorable results to the surviving peasants in England and the rest of Western Europe. There was increased social mobility, as depopulation further eroded the peasants' already-weakened obligations to remain on their traditional holdings. Seigneurialism never recovered. Land was plentiful, wages high, and serfdom had all but disappeared. It was possible to move about and rise higher in life. Younger sons and women especially benefited. As population growth resumed, however, peasants again faced deprivation and famine.

In Eastern Europe, by contrast, renewed stringency of laws tied the remaining peasantry more tightly to the land than ever before through serfdom.

Furthermore, the plague's great population reduction brought cheaper land prices; more food for the average peasant; and a relatively large increase in per capita income among the peasantry, if not immediately, in the coming century. Since the plague left vast areas of farmland untended, they were made available for pasture and put more meat on the market. The consumption of meat and dairy products went up, as did the export of beef and butter from the Low Countries, Scandinavia and northern Germany. However, the upper class often attempted to stop the changes, initially in Western Europe and more forcefully and successfully in Eastern Europe, by instituting sumptuary laws. They regulated what people (particularly of the peasant class) could wear so that nobles could ensure that peasants did not begin to dress and act as a higher-class member with their increased wealth. Another tactic was to fix prices and wages so that peasants could not demand more with increasing value. In England, the Statute of Labourers 1351 was enforced, which stated that no peasant could ask for more wages than in 1346. That was met with varying success depending on the amount of rebellion it inspired. Such a law was one of the causes of the 1381 Peasants' Revolt in England.

The rapid development of the use was probably one of the consequences of the Black Death during which many landowning nobles died and left their realty to their widows and minor orphans.

=== Urban workers ===
In the wake of the drastic population decline brought on by the plague, wages shot up, and labourers could move to new localities in response to wage offers. Local and royal authorities in Western Europe instituted wage controls. The government controls sought to freeze wages at the old levels before the Black Death. Within England, for example, the Ordinance of Labourers, enacted in 1349, and the Statute of Labourers, enacted in 1351, restricted both wage increases and the relocation of workers. If workers attempted to leave their current post, employers were given the right to have them imprisoned. The statute was poorly enforced in most areas, and farm wages in England on average doubled between 1350 and 1450, but they were then static until the late 19th century.

Cohn, comparing numerous countries, argues that the laws were not designed primarily to freeze wages. Instead, he says that the energetic local and royal measures to control labour and artisans' prices were responses to elite fears of the greed and the possible new powers of the lesser classes that had gained new freedom. Cohn continues that the laws reflected the anxiety that followed the Black Death's new horrors of mass mortality and destruction and from elite anxiety about manifestations, such as the flagellant movement and the persecution of Jews, Catalans (in Sicily) and beggars.

=== Labour-saving adaptations ===
The Black Death encouraged innovation of labour-saving technologies, leading to higher productivity. There was also a shift from grain farming to animal husbandry. Grain farming was very labor-intensive, but animal husbandry needed only a shepherd and a few dogs and pastureland.

By 1200, virtually all of the Mediterranean basin and most of northern Germany had been deforested and cultivated. Indigenous flora and fauna were replaced by domestic grasses and animals, and domestic woodlands were lost. With depopulation, the process was reversed. Much of the primeval vegetation returned, and abandoned fields and pastures were reforested.

=== Changing land-contracts and end of serfdom ===
Plague brought an eventual end of serfdom in Western Europe. The manorial system was already in trouble, but the Black Death assured its demise throughout much of Western and Central Europe by 1500. Severe depopulation and migration of the village to cities caused an acute shortage of agricultural labourers. Many villages were abandoned. In England, more than 1300 villages were deserted between 1350 and 1500. Wages of labourers were high, but the rise in nominal wages after the Black Death was swamped by inflation and so real wages fell.

Labour was in such a short supply that landlords were forced to give better terms of tenure. That resulted in much lower rents in Western Europe. By 1500, a new form of tenure called copyhold became prevalent in Europe. In copyhold, both a landlord and peasant made their best business deal, whereby the peasant got use of the land and the landlord got a fixed annual payment, and both possessed a copy of the tenure agreement. Serfdom did not end everywhere and lingered in parts of Western Europe and was introduced to Eastern Europe only after the Black Death.

There was also a change in inheritance law. Before the plague, only sons, especially the eldest son, inherited the ancestral property. After the Plague, all sons and daughters started to inherit property.

=== Persecutions ===
Renewed religious fervor and fanaticism came in the wake of the Black Death. Some Europeans targeted "groups such as Jews, friars, foreigners, beggars, pilgrims" lepers and Romani, who were thought to have caused the crisis.

Differences in cultural and lifestyle practices also led to persecution. As the plague swept across Europe in the mid-14th century, annihilating more than half the population, Jews became scapegoats, partly because better hygiene among Jewish communities and their isolation in ghettos meant that Jews were less affected. Accusations spread that Jews had caused the disease by deliberately poisoning wells. Mobs attacked Jewish settlements across Europe; by 1351, 60 major and 150 smaller Jewish communities had been destroyed, and more than 350 separate massacres had occurred.

According to Joseph P. Byrne, women also faced persecution during the Black Death. Muslim women in Cairo became scapegoats when the plague struck. Byrne writes that in 1438, the sultan of Cairo was informed by his religious lawyers, that the arrival of the plague was "Allah's punishment for the sin of fornication" and that in accordance with that theory, a law was set in place stating that women were not allowed to make public appearances, as "they may tempt men into sin". Byrne describes that law as being lifted only when "the wealthy complained that their female servants could not shop for food".

=== Religion ===
The Black Death hit the monasteries very hard because of their proximity with the sick who sought refuge there. That left a severe shortage of clergy after the epidemic cycle. Eventually, the losses were replaced by hasty and inexperienced clergy members, many of whom knew little of the rigours of their predecessors. New colleges were opened at established universities, and the training process was sped up. The shortage of priests opened new opportunities for laywomen to assume more extensive and more important service roles in the local parish.

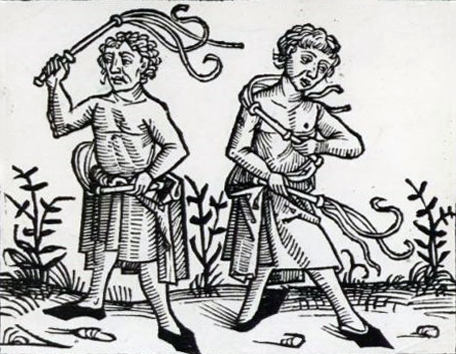
Woodcut of flagellants (Nuremberg Chronicle, 1493)

Flagellants practiced self-flogging (whipping of oneself) to atone for sins. The movement became popular after the Black Death. It may be that the flagellants' later involvement in hedonism was an effort to accelerate, to absorb God's wrath and to shorten the time with which others suffered. More likely, the focus of attention and popularity of their cause contributed to a sense that the world itself was ending and that their individual actions were of no consequence.

Reformers rarely pointed to failures on the part of the Church in dealing with the catastrophe.

== Cultural effects ==
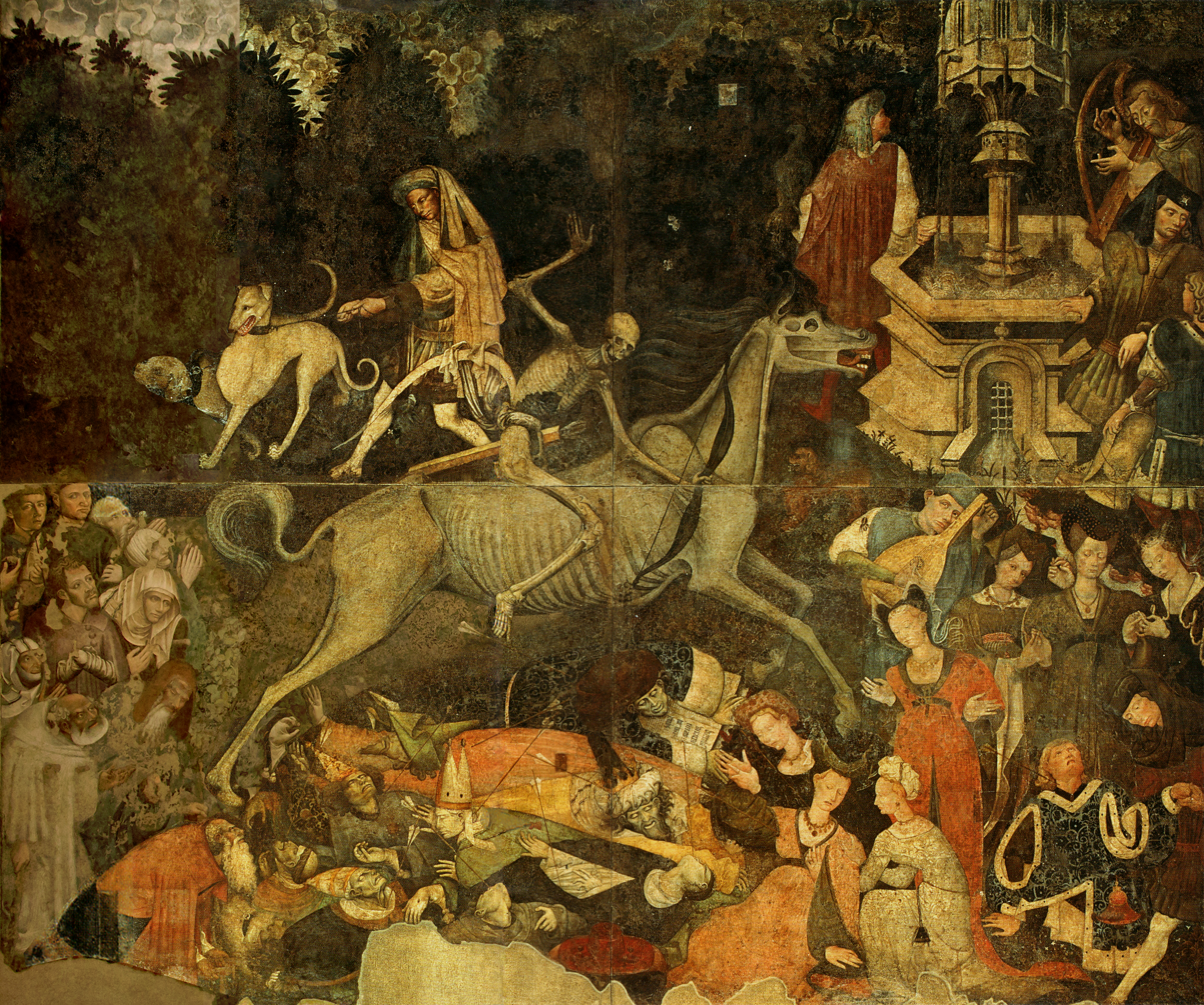
The Triumph of Death (1446)

The Black Death had profound effects on art and literature. After 1350, European culture in general turned very morbid. The general mood was one of pessimism, and contemporary art turned dark with representations of death. The widespread image of the "dance of death" showed death (a skeleton) choosing victims at random. The skeletons in the dance of death or danse macabre paintings often are of different social classes dancing together, representing how no amount of wealth can save one from death. The painting motif was first found as fresco on a wall in a Paris cemetery and emphasizes how the living will someday join the dead. Many of the most graphic depictions come from writers such as Boccaccio and Petrarch. Peire Lunel de Montech, writing about 1348 in the lyric style long out of fashion, composed the following sorrowful sirventes "Meravilhar no·s devo pas las gens" during the height of the plague in Toulouse:

They died by the hundreds, both day and night, and all were thrown in... ditches and covered with earth. And as soon as those ditches were filled, more were dug. And I, Agnolo di Tura... buried my five children with my own hands.... And so many died that all believed it was the end of the world.

=== Literary influences ===
Boccaccio wrote:

How many valiant men, how many fair ladies, breakfast with their kinfolk and the same night supped with their ancestors in the next world! The condition of the people was pitiable to behold. They sickened by the thousands daily, and died unattended and without help. Many died in the open street, others dying in their houses, made it known by the stench of their rotting bodies. Consecrated churchyards did not suffice for the burial of the vast multitude of bodies, which were heaped by the hundreds in vast trenches, like goods in a ship's hold and covered with a little earth.

Another common painting motif that originated from the Black Death was called "three living meet the three dead", which depicts three living people encountering three corpses, reminding the living of their inevitable fate.

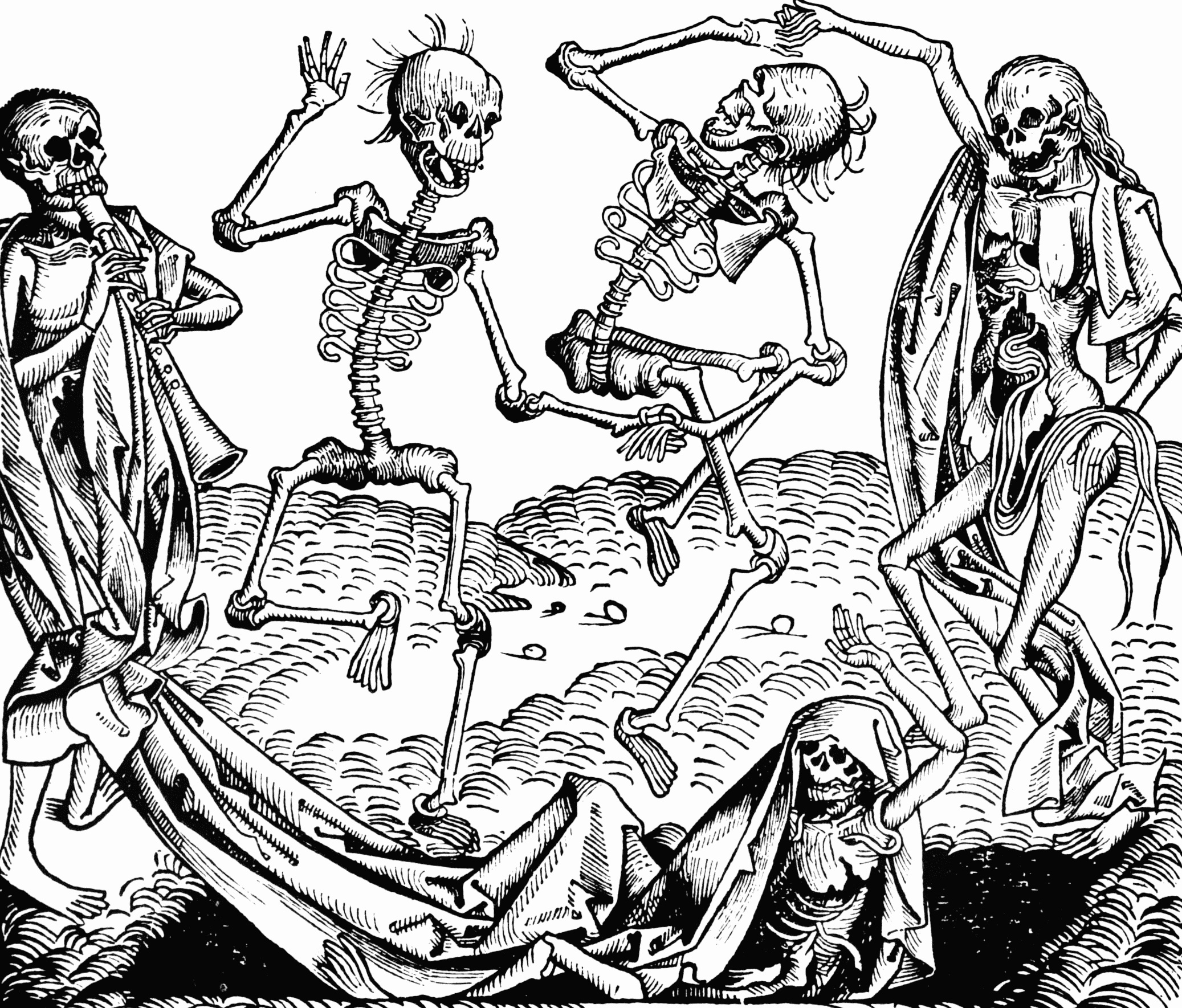
Danse Macabre from the Nuremberg Chronicle (1493)

=== Medicine ===
Although the Black Death highlighted the shortcomings of medical science in the Middle Ages, it also led to positive changes in the field of medicine. As described by David Herlihy in The Black Death and the Transformation of the West, more emphasis was placed on "anatomical investigations" after the Black Death. The way that individuals studied the human body notably changed and became a process that dealt more directly with the human body in varied states of sickness and health. Furthermore, the importance of surgeons became more evident.

A theory put forth by Stephen O'Brien is that the Black Death is likely responsible by natural selection for the high frequency of the CCR5-Δ32 genetic defect in people of European descent. The gene affects T cell function and provides protection against HIV, smallpox and possibly plague, but for the last, no explanation exists on how it would do that. However, that is now challenged since the CCR5-Δ32 gene has been found to be just as common in Bronze Age tissue samples.

=== Architecture ===
The Black Death also inspired European architecture to move in two different directions: (1) a revival of Greco-Roman styles, and (2) a further elaboration of the Gothic style. Late medieval churches had impressive structures centred on verticality in which one's eye is drawn up towards the high ceiling. The basic Gothic style was revamped with elaborate decoration in the late medieval period. Sculptors in Italian city-states emulated the work of their Roman forefathers, and sculptors in Northern Europe, no doubt inspired by the devastation they had witnessed, gave way to a heightened expression of emotion and an emphasis on individual differences. A tough realism came forth in architecture as in literature. Images of intense sorrow, decaying corpses and individuals with faults as well as virtues emerged. North of the Alps, painting reached a pinnacle of precise realism with Early Dutch painting by artists such as Jan van Eyck (c. 1390 – 1441). The natural world was reproduced in those works with meticulous detail whose realism was not unlike photography.

== See also ==
- Economic consequences of population decline
- Impact of the COVID-19 pandemic
