= John Ball (priest) =

English rebel and priest (c. 1338–1381)

- Medieval drawing of John Ball giving hope to Wat Tyler's rebels
- Born: c. 1338; Peldon, Essex, Kingdom of England
- Died: 15 July 1381 (aged 42/43); St Albans, Kingdom of England
- Occupation: Priest
- Known for: Peasants' Revolt

John Ball (c. 1338 – 15 July 1381) was an English priest who took a prominent part in the Peasants' Revolt of 1381. Although he is often associated with John Wycliffe and the Lollard movement, Ball was actively preaching "articles contrary to the faith of the church" at least a decade before Wycliffe started attracting attention.

== Biography ==
It is possible that John Ball was the son of William and Joan Ball of Peldon near Colchester. He was born c. 1338 and it has been suggested that his name is first mentioned in the Colchester Court Rolls of 30 January 1352, when, on coming of age in 1350, he acknowledged the tenancy of a tenement between East and West Stockwell Street in the town. Whether this is the John Ball from the Peasants' Revolt is not clear and others see this among the "speculative attempts" at reconstructing Ball's early life.

Ball trained as a priest in York and referred to himself, according to Thomas Walsingham, as "Seynte Marie priest of York". He later moved to Norwich and to Colchester. At that time, England was exhausted by death on a massive scale and crippling taxes. The Black Death in England was followed by years of war, which had to be paid for. The population was nearly halved by disease, and overworked, and onerous flat-rate poll taxes were imposed.

His utterances brought him into conflict with Simon of Sudbury, Archbishop of Canterbury, and he was thrown in prison on several occasions. He also appears to have been excommunicated; owing to which, in 1366 it was forbidden for anyone to hear him preach. These measures, however, did not moderate his opinions, nor diminish his popularity, and he took to speaking to parishioners in churchyards after official services.

Ball was imprisoned in Maidstone, Kent, at the time of the 1381 Revolt. What is recorded of his adult life comes from hostile sources emanating from the religious and political social order. He is said to have gained considerable fame as a roving preacher without a parish or any link to the established order by expounding the doctrines of John Wycliffe, and especially by his insistence on social equality. He delivered radical sermons in many places, including Ashen, Billericay, Bocking, Braintree, Cressing Temple, Dedham, Coggeshall, Fobbing, Goldhanger, Great Baddow, Little Henny, Stisted and Waltham.

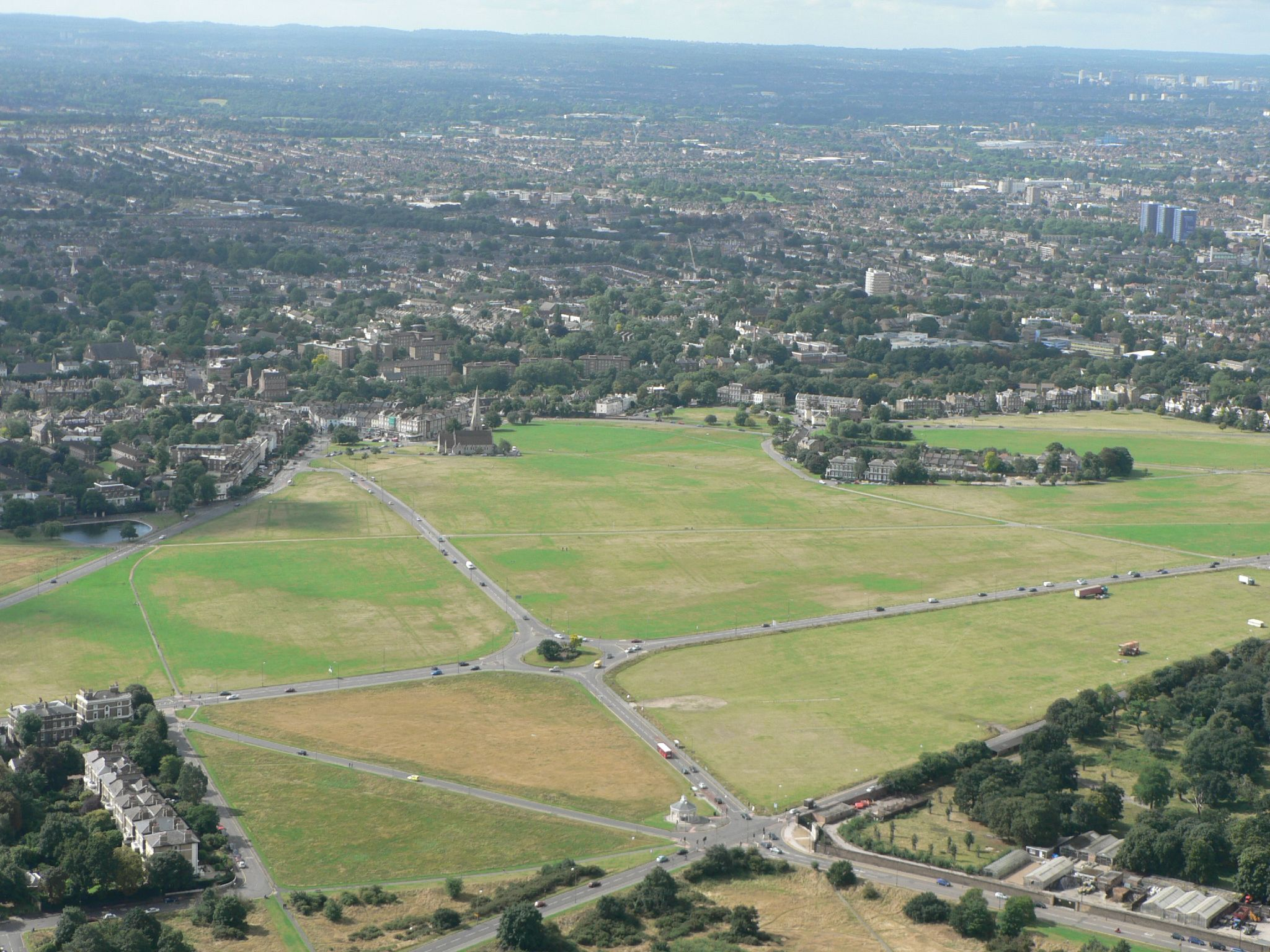
A modern aerial view of Blackheath looking south

Shortly after the Peasants' Revolt began, Ball was released by the Kentish rebels from his prison. He preached to them at Blackheath (the peasants' rendezvous to the south of Greenwich) in an open-air sermon that included the following:

When Adam delved and Eve span, (Note: Delved meaning dug the fields, and span meaning spun fabric (or flax).) Who was then the gentleman? From the beginning all men by nature were created alike, and our bondage or servitude came in by the unjust oppression of naughty (Note: "Naughty" then having a stronger sense of "evil, malicious".) men. For if God would have had any bondmen from the beginning, He would have appointed who should be bond, and who free. And therefore I exhort you to consider that now the time is come, appointed to us by God, in which ye may (if ye will) cast off the yoke of bondage, and recover liberty.

When the rebels had dispersed, Ball was taken prisoner at Coventry, given a trial in which, unlike most, he was permitted to speak. He was hanged, drawn and quartered at St Albans in the presence of King Richard II on 15 July 1381. His head was displayed stuck on a pike on London Bridge, and the quarters of his body were displayed at four different towns. Called by Froissart "the mad priest of Kent," Ball seems to have possessed the gift of rhyme. He voiced the feelings of a section of the discontented lower orders of society at that time, who chafed at villeinage and the lords' rights of unpaid labour, or corvée.

== John Ball in popular culture ==
Historian James Crossley has shown that Ball was largely portrayed negatively for four centuries after his death in theological works, plays, poems, and popular histories. After the 1790s, Ball became a hero for radicals, revolutionaries, socialists, and communists as well as becoming a more respected figure in English history and a recurring figure in novels.

Ball is also mentioned at John Gower's Vox Clamantis line 793. Morley translates this as:

Ball was the preacher, the prophet and teacher, inspired by a spirit of hell,
And every fool advanced in his school, to be taught as the devil thought well.

Ball appears as a character in the anonymous play The Life and Death of Jack Straw, published in London in 1593, which deals with the events of the Peasants' Revolt.

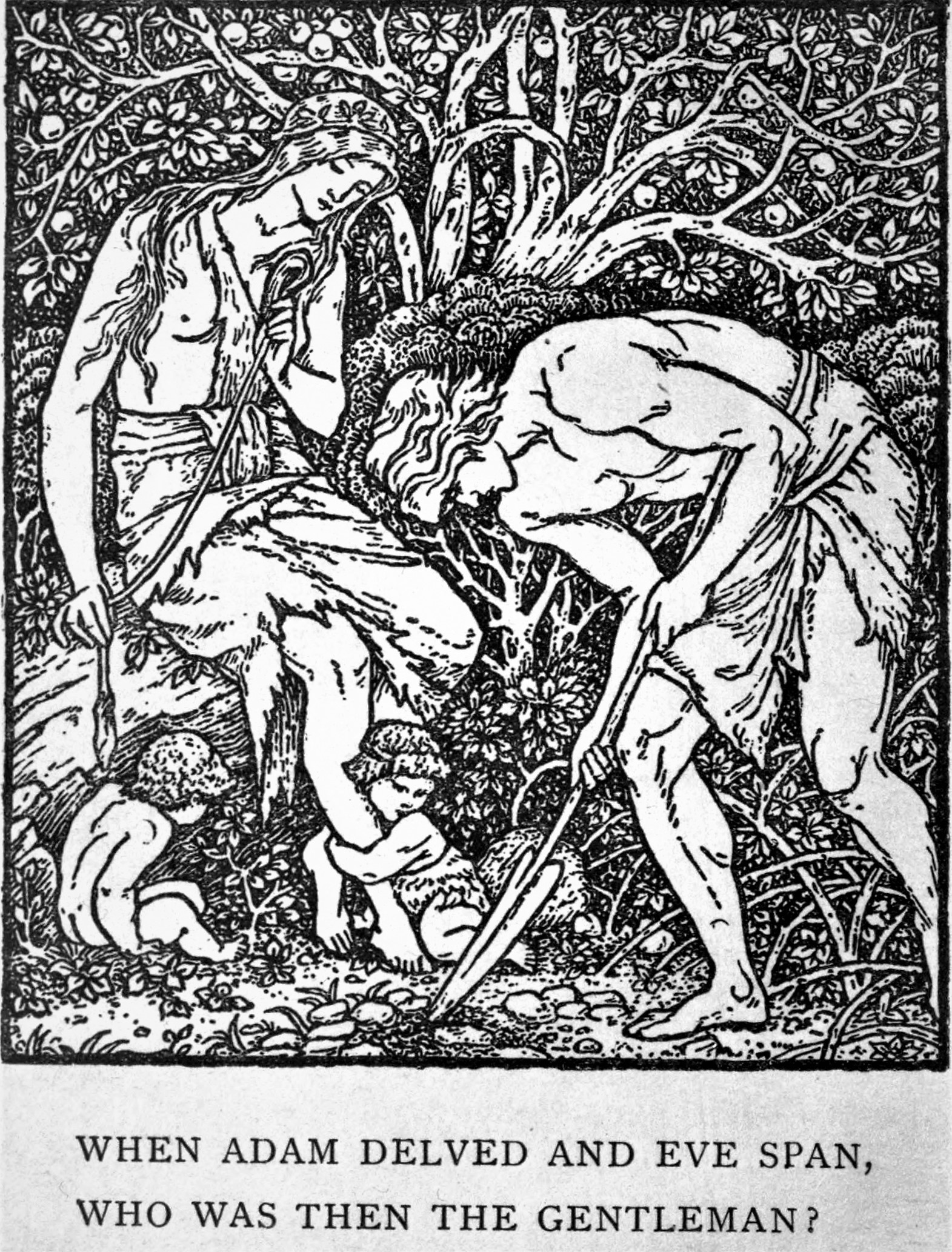
Illustration from title page to William Morris's A Dream of John Ball (1888)

William Morris wrote a short story called "A Dream of John Ball", which was serialised in The Commonweal between November 1886 and February 1887. It was published in book form in 1888.

Ball appears in the historical novel Robert Annys: A Poor Priest (1901) by Annie Nathan Meyer. Ball appears as a sympathetic character in the novel Long Will (1903) by Florence Converse.

There is a steep hill on the A5199 road in Leicestershire, between Shearsby and Husbands Bosworth, that is colloquially called "John Ball Hill".

A chapel at the parish church of Thaxted in Essex was dedicated to John Ball under the Anglo-Catholic socialist vicar, Conrad Noel (1910–1942).

Bedfordshire on Sunday, a free local newspaper based in Bedford, ran a weekly column by a fictional journalist called "John Ball's Diary", which featured behind-the-scenes life in the office of the newspaper. The column was written by members of the editorial staff.

John Ball appears in the 1954 historical novel Katherine by Anya Seton.

Ball made an appearance in the Newbery Medal-winning 2002 novel Crispin: The Cross of Lead. He was a priest, as he usually is, and was assisting a character by the name of Bear in the Peasants' Revolt of 1381.

John Ball is referenced several times in T. H. White's The Once and Future King, most prominently in the fourth book, The Candle in the Wind. In the final chapter (14), King Arthur muses on his failure to unite England. Arthur tries to understand what forces are at work that make mankind fight wars and references the "communism" of John Ball as a precursor to Mordred's Thrashers.

John Ball's line, "When Adam delved and Eve span, Who was then the gentleman?" serves as the epigraph to Zadie Smith's 2012 novel NW, which follows characters who grew up on a council estate in northwest London.

In Act V Scene 1 of Hamlet, Shakespeare has the Gravedigger (First Clown) discuss the line "When Adam delved and Eve span, Who was then the gentleman?" with a bit of a reversed sense: in Adam's time there were none but gentlemen.

First Clown: ... Come, my spade. There is no ancient gentleman but gardeners, ditchers, and grave-makers: they hold up Adam's profession.

Second Clown: Was he a gentleman?

First Clown: He was the first that ever bore arms.

Second Clown: Why, he had none.

First Clown: What, art a heathen? How dost thou understand the Scripture? The
Scripture says 'Adam digged:' could he dig without arms?

English songwriter Sydney Carter wrote an eponymously titled song about Ball that has been recorded by a number of artists. "Sing John Ball" is regularly performed in the UK by folk musicians including The Young'uns, The Melrose Quartet, and in 2015 the group Sweet Liberties performed the song in the Houses of Parliament.

In the 2026 film The Uprising, Ball is played by Jamie Bell.

== See also ==
- John Ball Primary School, Blackheath
