= Henrietta Branford =

English children's writer

- Born: 12 January 1946
- Died: 23 April 1999 (aged 53)
- Occupation: novelist
- Spouses: Paul Carter
- Writing career
- Years active: 1986-1999
- Genres: Children's Fiction
- Notable works: The Fated Sky, Fire, Bed and Bone
- Notable awards: Guardian Children's Fiction Prize; 1998 Fire, Bed and Bone; Nestlé Smarties Book Prize; 1997 Fire, Bed and Bone – Bronze; Nestlé Smarties Book Prize; 1994 Dimanche Diller

Henrietta Diana Primrose Longstaff Branford (12 January 1946 – 23 April 1999) was an English author of children's books. Her greatest success was Fire, Bed and Bone (1997), a historical novel set during the English peasants' revolt of 1381. For that she won the Guardian Children's Fiction Prize, a once-in-a-lifetime book award judged by a panel of British children's writers, and she was a highly commended runner up for the Carnegie Medal from the Library Association, recognising the year's best children's book by a British subject. (Note: Today there are usually eight books on the Carnegie shortlist. According to CCSU, some runners up through 2002 were Commended (from 1954) or Highly Commended (from 1966); the Highly Commended distinction became approximately annual in 1979. There were about 160 commendations of both kinds in 49 years including Branford (highly commended) and J. K. Rowling for 1997. • In effect, the librarians named Fire, Bed and Bone and Harry Potter and the Philosopher's Stone second and third to River Boy by Tim Bowler.)

== Biography ==
Branford was born in India, and raised in an isolated part of the New Forest in Hampshire, where she learned about animals and learned to ride a horse. After living in many other places she moved to Southampton in 1980 with her husband Paul Carter, a photographer, and their three children.

Branford had a variety of jobs: as a nanny, in shops, hotels and offices, and for a charity helping elderly people in South London. She trained as a community and youth worker at Goldsmiths' College from 1970 to 1972 but didn't enjoy it. She started writing as a career when she was 40 and in the thirteen years before her death she wrote 25 books for children from toddlers to teens. Her first novel was Royal Blunder. The Fated Sky and Fire, Bed and Bone are two notable others.

Branford was diagnosed with breast cancer in December 1997. Subsequently, she endured chemotherapy and three operations but her cancer was too vigorous to be treated effectively. She died at home in Southampton on 23 April 1999.

== Legacy ==
After her death, two annual awards were created by Julia Eccleshare (Children's Book Editor at The Guardian) and Anne Marley (head of Children's, Youth & Schools Services for Hampshire Library & Information Service). The Branford Boase Award for first time writers commemorates both Branford and her editor Wendy Boase who also died of cancer in 1999. The Henrietta Branford Writing Competition for children was conceived by Branford who did not have time to establish it.

== Selected works ==
- Royal Blunder (1990)
- Royal Blunder and the Haunted House (1990)
- Clare's Summer (1993)
- Dimanche Diller (1994)
- Dimanche Diller in Danger (1994)
- Someone Somewhere (1995)
- The Theft of Thor's Hammer (1995)
- Nightmare Neighbours (1995)
- Dimanche Diller at Sea (1996)
- Spacebaby (1996)
- The Fated Sky (1996)
- Fire, Bed, and Bone (1997)
- Chance of Safety (1998)
- Myths and Legends (1998)
- White Wolf (1998)
- Prospers Mountain (1999)
- Dipper's Island (1999)
- Ruby Red (1999)
- Little Pig Figwort (2000 posthumously)
