= Fire, Bed, and Bone =

1997 children's novel by Henrietta Branford

Fire, Bed and Bone
- Author: Henrietta Branford
- Cover artist: Helen Schulman
- Language: English
- Genre: Children's historical novel
- Publisher: Walker Books
- Publication date: 1997
- Publication place: United Kingdom
- Media type: Print (hardcover & paperback)
- Pages: 127 pp (first edition)
- ISBN: 0744554845
- OCLC: 789628635
- LC Class: PZ7.B737385 Fi 1998

Fire, Bed, and Bone by Henrietta Branford is a historical novel for older children set at the time of the Peasants' Revolt. It was published by Walker Books in 1997. Branford won the annual Guardian Children's Fiction Prize, a once-in-a-lifetime book award judged by a panel of British children's writers.

Walker's North American division Candlewick Press published the first U.S. edition in 1998.

== Plot summary ==
The story is narrated by a nameless hunting dog, as witness to the English Peasants' Revolt of 1381. She does her best to survive while trying to raise her own puppy Fleabane after the others were brutally mauled to death by a wild cat, tracking her captive owners Rufus and Comfort as they are tried for heresy. Branford's martianist technique (see Craig Raine) creates a more primal narrative voice in contrast with the suspected response of the reader, but themes including maternal affection and honour unite man and dog.

One catalog summary:

"In 1381 in England, a hunting dog recounts what happens to his beloved master Rufus and his family when they are arrested on suspicion of being part of the peasants' rebellion led by Wat Tyler and the preacher John Ball."

== Awards ==
Beside winning the Guardian Prize, Branford was a commended runner up for the annual Carnegie Medal from the Library Association, recognising the year's best children's book by a British subject. (Note: Since 1995 there are usually eight books on the Carnegie shortlist. According to CCSU, some runners up through 2002 were Commended (from 1955) or Highly Commended (from 1966); the Highly Commended distinction became approximately annual in 1979. There were about 160 commendations of both kinds in 48 years including Branford (highly commended) and J. K. Rowling in 1997.) Fire, Bed, and Bone also made the Kliatt Editors' Choice and Voice of Youth Advocates Non Fiction Honor List.

== See also ==
- List of peasant revolts
- Consequences of the Black Death
