= List of works by Margaret Mahy =

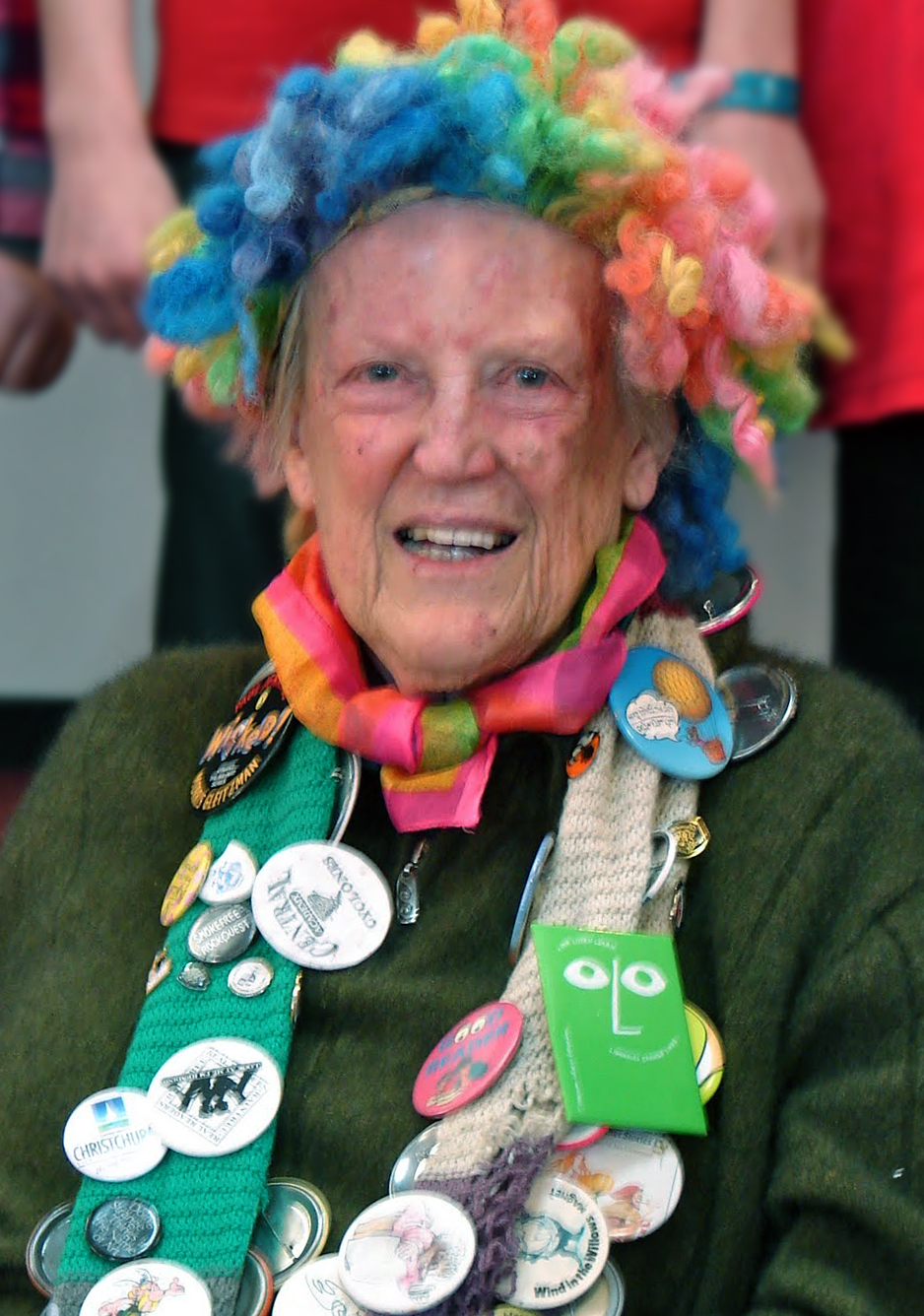
Margaret Mahy, with her characteristic rainbow wig, at the Kaiapoi Club, 2011

Margaret Mahy of New Zealand wrote more than 100 picture books, 40 novels and 20 short story collections, among other works.

== Books ==
Variant titles are given in parentheses, prefaced by "U.S." for titles of US editions, otherwise by "also".

Title	Illustrator	Publisher	Year	Notes	
A Lion in the Meadow	Jenny Williams ISBN 0460057812	J.M. Dent & Sons; Franklin Watts	1969	Winner of the Esther Glen Award (1970)	
The Dragon of an Ordinary Family	Helen Oxenbury ISBN 0434950009	William Heinemann Ltd; Franklin Watts	1969	Oxenbury won the Greenaway Medal (Note: The Kate Greenaway Medal and Carnegie Medal are companion annual book awards by the British librarians (CILIP, formerly the Library Association). They recognise the year's best children's books published in the UK, judged for illustration and writing respectively. Mahy won two Carnegie Medals and wrote the text for one Greenaway winner, illustrated by Helen Oxenbury (all when the awards were open only to British subjects).)	
Pillycock's Shop	Carol Barker ISBN 0234774738	Dobson Books Ltd; Franklin Watts	1969		
Mrs Discombobulous	Jan Brychta ISBN 0460057960	Dent; Watts	1969		
The Procession	Charles Mozley ISBN 0460057804	Dent; Watts	1969		
Sailor Jack and the 20 Orphans	Robert Bartelt	Dent	1970		
The Little Witch	Charles Mozley ISBN 0531018628	Dent; Franklin Watts	1970		
The Princess and the Clown	Carol Barker	Franklin Watts & Dobson	1971		
The Boy with Two Shadows	Jenny Williams	Dent	1971		
The First Margaret Mahy Story Book	Shirley Hughes	Dent	1972	Winner of the Esther Glen Award (1973)	
The Man Whose Mother was a Pirate	Brian Froud	Dent	1972	Also published in 1985 with Margaret Chamberlain as illustrator.	
17 Kings and 42 Elephants	Charles Mozley ISBN 0460058584	Dent	1972	Also published in 1987 with Patricia MacCarthy as illustrator.	
The Railway Engine and the Hairy Brigands	Brian Froud	Dent	1973		
The Second Margaret Mahy Story Book	Shirley Hughes	Dent	1973		
Clancy's Cabin	Trevor Stubley	Dent	1974		
The Bus Under the Leaves	Margery Gill	Dent	1974		
The Rare Spotted Birthday Party	Belinda Lyon	Franklin Watts	1974		
Stepmother	Terry Burton	Franklin Watts	1974		
Rooms to Let (US Rooms for Rent)	Jenny Williams	Dent	1974	Published in the US by Franklin Watts.	
The Witch in the Cherry Tree	Jenny Williams	Dent	1974		
Ultra-violet Catastrophe!: the Unexpected Walk with Great-Uncle Magnus Pringle	Brian Froud	Dent	1975		
New Zealand: Yesterday and Today		Franklin Watts	1975		
The Third Margaret Mahy Story Book	Shirley Hughes	Dent	1975		
The Great Millionaire Kidnap	Jan Brychta	Dent	1975		
The Boy Who was Followed Home	Steven Kellogg	Franklin Watts	1975		
Leaf Magic	Jenny Williams	Dent	1976		
David's Witch Doctor	Jim Russell	Watts	1976		
The Wind Between the Stars	Brian Froud	J.M. Dent & Sons	1976		C
Look under V	Deirdre Gardiner	School Publications Branch, Dept. of Education	1977		
Non-stop Nonsense	Quentin Blake	J.M. Dent & Sons	1977		
The Pirate Uncle	Mary Dinsdale	J.M. Dent & Sons	1977		
The Great Piratical Rumbustification & The Librarian and the Robbers	Quentin Blake	J.M. Dent; David R. Godine, Publisher	1978; 1986		C
Raging Robots and Unruly Uncles	Peter Stevenson	Dent/Harper & Row	1981		sfn
The Haunting		Dent	1982	Winner of the Carnegie Medal (1982) and the Esther Glen Award (1983)	sfn
The Chewing-gum Rescue and Other Stories	Jan Ormerod	Dent	1982		
The Pirates' Mixed-up Voyage: Dark Doings in the Thousand Islands	Margaret Chamberlain	Dent	1983		sfn
The Birthday Burglar & A Very Wicked Headmistress	Margaret Chamberlain	Dent	1984		
The Changeover: a Supernatural Romance		Dent	1984	Winner of the Carnegie Medal (1984) and the Esther Glen Award (1985)	sfn
The Dragon's Birthday	Philip Webb	Shortland	1984		
Leaf Magic and Five Other Favourites	Margaret Chamberlain	J.M. Dent & Sons	1984		C
The Man Whose Mother Was a Pirate	Margaret Chamberlain	Viking Kestrel	1985	Also published in 1972 with Brian Froud as illustrator.	
The Catalogue of the Universe		Dent	1985	Winner of the Phoenix Award (2005)	
Jam: a True Story	Helen Craig	Dent	1985		
The Downhill Crocodile Whizz and Other Stories	Ian Newsham	J.M. Dent & Sons	1986		C
The Tricksters		J.M. Dent & Sons	1986	Honor Book at the Phoenix Awards (2006)	sfn
Aliens in the Family		Scholastic	1986		sfn
The Girl Who Washed in Moonlight	Robyn Belton	Heinemann	1987		
Chocolate Porridge and Other Stories	Shirley Hughes	J.M. Dent & Sons	1987		
Memory		Dent	1987	Shortlisted for the Esther Glen Award (1988), winner of the Phoenix Award (2007)	
The Boy Who Bounced and Other Magic Tales	Shirley Hughes	Puffin	1988		C
The Door in the Air and Other Stories	Diana Catchpole	Dent	1988		C
The Blood-and-thunder Adventure on Hurricane Peak	Wendy Smith	Dent	1989	Shortlisted for the Esther Glen Award (1990)	sfn
The Great White Man-Eating Shark: A Cautionary Tale	Jonathan Allen	Dent/Holiday House	1989		
The Tin Can Band and Other Poems	Honey de Lacey	Dent	1989		
The Seven Chinese Brothers	Jean and Mou-sien Tseng	Macmillan/Scholastic	1989		
Making friends	Wendy Smith	Dent/M.K. McElderry Books	1990		
The Pumpkin Man and the Crafty Creeper	Helen Craig	Jonathan Cape	1990		
Dangerous Spaces		Hamish Hamilton	1991	Shortlisted in the Fiction category of the AIM Children's Book Awards (1992)	sfn
Bubble Trouble and Other Poems and Stories	Tony Ross	Hamish Hamilton	1991		
Keeping House	Wendy Smith	Hamish Hamilton/Simon & Schuster Books For Young Readers	1991		C
The Horrendous Hullabaloo	Patricia MacCarthy	Hamish Hamilton	1992		
Under-runners		Hamish Hamilton/Viking	1992	Winner of the Esther Glen Award (1993) and shortlisted in the Junior Fiction category of the AIM Children's Book Awards (1993)	
The Girl With the Green Ear: Stories about Magic in Nature	Shirley Hughes	A.A. Knopf	1992		C
The Good Fortunes Gang	John Farman	Doubleday	1993	Cousins quarter series, book 1	
A Fortunate Name	Marion Young	Delacorte	1993	Cousins quarter series, book 2	
A Fortune Branches Out	John Farman	Doubleday	1993	Cousins quarter series, book 3	
Tangled Fortunes	John Farman	Doubleday	1994	Cousins quarter series, book 4	
The Three-legged Cat	Jonathan Allen	Hamish Hamilton	1993		
A Busy Day for a Good Grandmother	Margaret Chamberlain	Hamish Hamilton	1993		
The Greatest Show Off Earth	Wendy Smith	Hamish Hamilton	1994	Shortlisted for the Esther Glen Award (1995)	sfn
The Dragon's Telephone	Christine Ross	Telecom New Zealand	1994		
The Rattlebang Picnic	Steven Kellogg	Dial Books	1994		
The Christmas Tree Tangle	Anthony Kerins	Hamish Hamilton	1994		
The Big Black Bulging Bump	Robert Staermose	Scholastic	1995		
Tingleberries, Tuckertubs and Telephones: a Tale of Love and Ice-cream	Robert Staermose	Hamish Hamilton	1995	Shortlisted for the Esther Glen Award (1996)	
The Other Side of Silence		Hamish Hamilton/Viking	1995	Shortlisted for the Esther Glen Award (1997)	
Boom, Baby, Boom, Boom!	Patricia MacCarthy	Hamish Hamilton	1996		
The Five Sisters	Patricia MacCarthy	Hamish Hamilton	1996		
Questions Kids Ask Margaret Mahy		Scholastic	1996		
Beaten by a Balloon	Jonathan Allen	Hamish Hamilton/Penguin	1997		
Operation Terror	Ron Tiner	Puffin	1997	(listed in some places with the incorrect title Operator Terror)	
The Horribly Haunted School	Robert Staermose	Hamish Hamilton	1997		sfn
A Summery Saturday Morning	Selina Young	Hamish Hamilton	1998	Winner of Book of the Year and the Picture Book category at the New Zealand Post Children's Book Awards (1999)	
Down in the Dump with Dinsmore	Stephen Axelsen	Puffin	1999	In the Kiwi Bites series. In the Junior Fiction category of the Storylines Notable Books List (2000)	
Don't read this! and Other Tales of the Unnatural	Thé Tjong-Khing	Front Street	1998	A collection of ghost stories and "spooky tales" for children by several authors. Mahy wrote the first story, Fingers on the Back of the Neck.	
A Villain's Night Out	Harry Horse	Puffin	1999	Winner of an Honour Award in the Junior Fiction category of the New Zealand Post Children's Book Awards (2000). Included in the Junior Fiction category of the Storylines Notable Books List (2000)	
Simply Delicious!	Jonathan Allen	Frances Lincoln	1999		
24 hours		Margaret K. McElderry Books/Collins	2000	Winner of the Esther Glen Award, an Honour Award in the Senior Fiction category at the New Zealand Post Children's Book Awards, and included in the Senior Fiction category of the Storylines Notable Books List (all 2001)	
Down the Dragon's Tongue	Patricia MacCarthy	Frances Lincoln	2000	Included in the Picture Book category of the Storylines Notable Books List (2002)	
A Dissolving Ghost: Essays and More		Victoria University Press	2000		
The Riddle of the Frozen Phantom	Chris Mould	Collins	2001	Winner of an Honour Award in the Senior Fiction category at the New Zealand Post Children's Book Awards, and included in the Senior Fiction category of the Storylines Notable Books List (both 2002)	sfn
Dashing Dog!	Sarah Garland	Frances Lincoln	2002	Included in the Picture Book category of the Storylines Notable Books List (2003)	
Alchemy		CollinsFlamingo	2002	Winner of the Senior Fiction category at the New Zealand Post Children's Book Awards, shortlisted for the Esther Glen Award, and included in the Senior Fiction category of the Storylines Notable Books List (all 2003)	sfn
Zerelda's Horses	Gabriella Klepatski	Puffin	2005	In the Kiwi Bites series	
Maddigan's Fantasia (also Maddigan's Quest)		HarperCollins	2005	Shortlisted in the Junior Fiction category of the New Zealand Post Children's Book Awards, and included in the Junior Fiction category of the Storylines Notable Books List (both 2006).	sfn
Kaitangata Twitch		Allen & Unwin	2005	Winner of an Honour Award in the Senior Fiction category of the New Zealand Post Children's Book Awards, and included in the Senior Fiction category of the Storylines Notable Books List (both 2006).	
Portable Ghosts		HarperCollins	2006		
Down the Back of the Chair	Polly Dunbar	Frances Lincoln	2006	Special Mention in the Picture Books category of the Storylines Notable Books List (2007)	
Family Surprises	Lyn Kriegler	Puffin	2006	In the Kiwi Bites series	
Bubble Trouble	Polly Dunbar	Frances Lincoln	2008	Picture Book winner at the Boston Globe–Horn Book Awards (2009)	
The Magician of Hoad (also Heriot)		HarperCollins	2008		sfn
Awesome Aotearoa: Margaret Mahy's History of New Zealand	Trace Hodgson	AUT University Media	2009		
The Dark Blue 100-ride Bus Ticket		HarperCollins	2009		sfn
The Word Witch: the Magical Verse of Margaret Mahy edited by Tessa Duder,	David Elliot	HarperCollins	2009	Winner of an Honour Award in the Picture Book category of the New Zealand Post Book Awards.	
Organ Music		Gecko Press	2010	Included in the Young Adult Fiction category of the Storylines Notable Books List (2011)	sfn
The Moon and Farmer McPhee	David Elliot	Random House	2010	Winner of the Book of the Year Award, and the Picture Book category, at the New Zealand Post Children's Book Awards; and included in the Picture Book category of the Storylines Notable Books List (2011)	
The Margaret Mahy Treasury: Eleven Favourite Stories from the Marvellous Margaret Mahy		Puffin	2011		
Footsteps Through the Fog	Gavin Bishop	Puffin	2012	Authors' royalties will be donated to the Royal New Zealand Foundation of the Blind. Due for publication on 24 October 2012, as of August 2012.	
The Green Bath	Steven Kellogg	Arthur A. Levine Books	2013		
Tale of a tail	Tony Ross	Orion Children's Books	2014	Commissioned by Polish photographer Tomasz Gudzowaty, this posthumously published novel was loosely inspired by the character of his real-life animal friend.	

== Television ==
Series/title	Episode(s)	Role(s)	Year	Notes
Woolly Valley	All	Writer	1982	
Cuckoo Land	All	Creator/writer	1986	
The Haunting of Barney Palmer	N/A (television film)	Writer/original author	1986	Based on Mahy's 1982 novel, The Haunting
Aliens in the Family	All	Original author	1987	Based on Mahy's 1986 novel of the same name.
Dramarama	The Horrible Story	Original author	1987	
Playbus	The Princess and the Clown & Thunderstorms and Rainbows	Original author	1988	
Strangers	All	Creator/writer	1989	Gold Medal – Young Programme (Ages 7–12) at the 1990 New York Film Festival
Country Kiwi and the Cool City Cat	All	co-writer	1989	
Typhon's People	All	Writer	1993	
The Magical World of Margaret Mahy	All	Creator/original author	1994	
Made in New Zealand – Margaret Mahy	N/A (documentary)	Subject	2004	
Maddigan's Quest	All	Creator/writer	2005	Accompanied by her 2005 novel, Maddigan's Fantasia. Best Children's Programme and various other awards and nominations at the 2007 Air New Zealand Screen Awards. Bronze Medal – Youth Television Programme (ages 7–12), and Best Art Direction – Television Section at the 2006 New York Festival, and nominated for Best Direction. Nominated for Best Children's/Youth Programme at the 2006 Qantas Television Awards.
A Tall Long Faced Tale	N/A (documentary)	Subject	2008	
Kaitangata Twitch	All	Original author	2010	Best Children's/Youth Programme at the 2011 Aotearoa Film & Television Awards. Platinum Remi Award (Mini-series category) at 2010 WorldFest-Houston. Various awards and nominations at the 2010 Qantas Film and TV Awards. Nominated in 7–11-year-old Fiction category at 2010 Prix Jeunesse (Germany).
Kaitangata Twitch	Episode One	Associate producer/cameo	2010	Best Children's/Youth Programme at the 2011 Aotearoa Film & Television Awards. Platinum Remi Award (Mini-series category) at 2010 WorldFest-Houston. Various awards and nominations at the 2010 Qantas Film and TV Awards. Nominated in 7–11-year-old Fiction category at 2010 Prix Jeunesse (Germany).
