= Phoenix Award =

English-language children's literature award

The Phoenix Award annually recognizes one English-language children's book published twenty years earlier that did not then win a major literary award. It is named for the mythical bird phoenix that is reborn from its own ashes, signifying the book's rise from relative obscurity.

The award was established and is conferred by the Children's Literature Association (ChLA), a nonprofit organization based in the United States whose mission is to advance "the serious study of children's literature". The winner is selected by an elected committee of five ChLA members, from nominations by members and outsiders. The token is a brass statue.

The inaugural, 1985 Phoenix Award recognized The Mark of the Horse Lord by Rosemary Sutcliff (Oxford, 1965). Beginning 1989, as many as two runners-up have been designated "Honor Books", with 34 named for the 29 years to 2017. (Note: See multiple sources for identification of all winners and honor books 1985 to 2018 (as of June 2017): winners and honor books tables 1985 to 2009 brochure 1985 to 2012 top page archived 2012 top page archived 2013 newsletter 2012.2 newsletter 2013.2 current top page)

A parallel award for children's picture books, the Phoenix Picture Book Award was approved in 2010 and inaugurated in 2013. There are two awards if the writer and illustrator are different people. "Books are considered not only for the quality of their illustrations, but for the way pictures and text work together to tell a story (whether fact or fiction). Wordless books are judged on the ability of the pictures alone to convey a story."

== Phoenix Award winners ==
There have been 35 Award winners and 35 Honor Books announced since 1985 (1965 to 1998 publications).

Phoenix Award 1985 to present
Year	Author	Title	Result	Ref.
1985	Rosemary Sutcliff	The Mark of the Horse Lord	Winner	
1986	Robert J. Burch	Queenie Peavy	Winner	
1987	Leon Garfield	Smith	Winner	
1988	Erik Christian Haugaard	The Rider and his Horse	Winner	
1989 (Note: Honor books were instituted in 1989.)	Helen Cresswell	The Night Watchmen	Winner	
1989	Milton Meltzer	Brother Can You Spare a Dime?	Honor	
1989	Adrienne Richard	Pistol	Honor	
1990	Sylvia Engdahl	Enchantress from the Stars	Winner	
1990	William Mayne	Ravensgill	Honor	
1990	Scott O'Dell	Sing Down the Moon	Honor	
1991	Jane Gardam	A Long Way from Verona	Winner	
1991	Ursula K. Le Guin	The Tombs of Atuan	Honor	
1991	William Mayne	A Game of Dark	Honor	
1992	Mollie Hunter	A Sound of Chariots	Winner	
1993	Nina Bawden	Carrie's War	Winner	
1993	E.L. Konigsburg	A Proud Taste for Scarlet and Miniver	Honor	
1994	Katherine Paterson	Of Nightingales That Weep	Winner	
1994	James Lincoln Collier and Christopher Collier	My Brother Sam is Dead	Honor	
1994	Sharon Bell Mathis	Listen for the Fig Tree	Honor	
1995	Laurence Yep	Dragonwings	Winner	
1995	Natalie Babbitt	Tuck Everlasting	Honor	
1996	Alan Garner	The Stone Book	Winner	
1996	William Steig	Abel's Island	Honor	
1997	Robert Cormier	I Am the Cheese	Winner	
1998	Jill Paton Walsh	A Chance Child	Winner	
1998	Robin McKinley	Beauty	Honor	
1998	Doris Orgel	The Devil in Vienna	Honor	
1999	E.L. Konigsburg	Throwing Shadows	Winner	
1999	Rosa Guy	The Disappearance	Honor	
1999	Ouida Sebestyen	Words by Heart	Honor	
2000 (Note: Seven acceptance speeches have been published online in one of two locations: Monica Hughes, 2000; Peter Dickinson, 2001; Zibby Oneal, 2002; Berlie Doherty, 2004; Peter Dickinson, 2008; Virginia Euwer Wolff, 2011; and Karen Hesse, 2012.)	Monica Hughes	Keeper of the Isis Light	Winner	
2000	Jane Langton	The Fledgling	Honor	
2001	Peter Dickinson	The Seventh Raven	Winner	
2001	Kathryn Lasky	The Night Journey	Honor	
2002	Zibby Oneal	A Formal Feeling	Winner	
2002	Clayton Bess	Story for a Black Night	Honor	
2003	Ivan Southall	The Long Night Watch	Winner	
2003	Cynthia Voigt	A Solitary Blue	Honor	
2004	Berlie Doherty	White Peak Farm	Winner	
2004	Brian Doyle	Angel Square	Honor	
2005	Margaret Mahy	The Catalogue of the Universe	Winner	
2005	Diana Wynne Jones	Fire and Hemlock	Honor	
2006	Diana Wynne Jones	Howl's Moving Castle	Winner	
2006	Margaret Mahy	The Tricksters	Honor	
2006	Philip Pullman	The Shadow in the Plate	Honor	
2007	Margaret Mahy	Memory	Winner	
2007	Sheila Gordon	Waiting for the Rain	Honor	
2008	Peter Dickinson	Eva	Winner	
2008	Jane Yolen	The Devil's Arithmetic	Honor	
2009	Francesca Lia Block	Weetzie Bat	Winner	
2009	Sylvia Cassedy	Lucie Babbidge’s House	Honor	
2010	Rosemary Sutcliff	The Shining Company	Winner	
2011	Virginia Euwer Wolff	The Mozart Season	Winner	
2011	Mary Downing Hahn	Stepping on the Cracks	Honor	
2011	Eloise McGraw	The Striped Ships	Honor	
2012	Karen Hesse	Letters from Rifka	Winner	
2012	Michael Dorris	Morning Girl	Honor	
2012	Frances Temple	Taste of Salt: A Story of Modern Haiti	Honor	
2013	Gaye Hiçyilmaz	The Frozen Waterfall	Winner	
2013	Walter Dean Myers	Malcolm X: By Any Means Necessary	Honor	
2014	Gary Soto	Jesse	Winner	
2014	Graham Salisbury	Under the Blood Red Sun	Honor	
2015	Kyoko Mori	One Bird	Winner	
2016	Andrew Clements	Frindle	Winner	
2017	James Heneghan	Wish Me Luck	Winner	
2017	Paul Fleischman	Seedfolks	Honor	
2017	Naomi Shihab Nye	Habibi	Honor	
2018	Elizabeth Partridge	Restless Spirit: The Life and Work of Dorothea Lange	Winner	
2019	Louise Erdrich	The Birchbark House	Winner	
2019	Connie Porter	Imani All Mine	Honor	
2020	Carolyn Coman	Many Stones	Winner	
2020	Walter Dean Myers	145th Street: Short Stories	Honor	
2021	Alyssa Brugman	Finding Grace	Winner	
2021	Chris Crutcher	Whale Talk	Honor	
2021	Tony Johnston	Any Small Goodness	Honor	
2022	Julie Otsuka	When the Emperor Was Divine	Winner	
2022	Linda Sue Park	When My Name Was Keoko	Honor	
2023	Tim Tingle	Walking the Choctaw Road	Winner	
2023	Richard Maurer	The Wright Sister: Katharine Wright and Her Famous Brothers	Honor	

== Multiple awards ==
As of 2021, there have been three two-time winners of the Phoenix Award:

- Rosemary Sutcliff, 1985, 2010
- Peter Dickinson, 2001, 2008
- Margaret Mahy, 2005, 2007

Mahy of New Zealand was also a runner up in 2006.

Several of the winners have also received the British Carnegie Medal for other books: Sutcliff (1959); Garner (1967); Garfield (1970); Southall (1971); Hunter (1974); Dickinson (1979, 1980); Mahy (1982, 1984); Doherty (1986, 1991).

Three of the winners have also won the American Newbery Medal for other books: Konigsburg (1968 and 1997); Paterson (1978, 1981); Hesse (1998).

== Picture Book Award winners ==
The Phoenix Picture Book Award was first given in 2013, for books originally published in 1993.

Phoenix Picture Book Award, 2013 to present
Year	Author	Title	Result	Ref.
2013	Kevin Henkes	Owen	Winner	
2013	Denise Fleming	In the Small, Small Pond	Honor	
2014	Raymond Briggs	The Bear	Winner	
2014	Anne Isaacs, illus. by Paul O. Zelinsky	Swamp Angel	Honor	
2014	Peggy Rathmann	Good Night, Gorilla	Honor	
2015	Sara Fanelli	My Map Book	Winner	
2015	Kady MacDonald Denton	Would They Love a Lion?	Honor	
2015	Charlotte Zolotow, illus. by Stefano Vitale	When the Wind Stops (revised and newly illustrated, 1995) (Note: The version of When the Wind Stops, written by Zolotow and illustrated by Vitale, eligible for the award was published by HarperCollins in 1995: OCLC 731251488. The original edition, written by Zolotow and edited by Ursula Nordstrom, was published in 1962 with illustrations by Howard Knotts (Harper & Row, OCLC 427201792) and by Joe Lasker (Abelard-Schuman, OCLC 680167163).)	Honor	
2016	Molly Bang	Goose	Winner	
2016	Julius Lester, illus. by Jerry Pinkney	Sam and the Tigers	Honor	
2017	Mary McKenna Siddals, illus. by Petra Mathers	Tell Me a Season	Winner	
2017	Demi	One Grain of Rice: A Mathematical Tale	Honor	
2018	Robert D. San Souci and Brian Pinkney	Cendrillon: A Caribbean Cinderella	Winner	
2018	Jacqueline Preiss Weitzman, illus. by Robin Preiss Glasser	You Can’t Take A Balloon Into the Metropolitan Museum	Honor	
2019	Christopher Myers	Black Cat	Winner	
2019	Amy Littlesuger, illus. by Floyd Cooper	Tree of Hope	Honor	
2020	Shaun Tan	The Lost Thing	Winner	
2020	Christopher Myers	Wings	Honor	
2021	Grace Lin	Dim Sum for Everyone!	Winner	
2021	Francisco X. Alarcón, illus. by Maya Christina Gonzalez	Iguanas in the Snow and Other Winter Poems/Iguanas en la nieve y otros poemas de inviero	Honor	
2021	Shaun Tan	The Red Tree	Honor	
2022	Allen Say	Home of the Brave	Winner	
2022	Lauren Child, illus. by Maya Christina Gonzalez	Who’s Afraid of The Big Bad Book?	Honor	
2022	Mordicai Gerstein	What Charlie Heard	Honor	
2022	Julius Lester, illus. by Joe Cepeda	Why Heaven is Far Away	Honor	
2023	Marla Frazee	Roller Coaster	Winner	
2023	Yuyi Morales	Just a Minute: A Trickster Tale and Counting Book	Honor	
2023	Jerdine Nolen, illus. by Kadir Nelson	Thunder Rose	Honor	
