= Handles (novel) =

1983 children's novel by Jan Mark

- First edition
- Author: Jan Mark
- Illustrator: David Parkins
- Language: English
- Genre: Children's realist novel
- Publisher: Kestrel Books
- Publication date: 26 October 1983
- Publication place: United Kingdom
- Media type: Print (hardcover; paperback)
- Pages: 156 pp (first edition)
- ISBN: 0722658575
- OCLC: 11358458
- LC Class: PZ7.M33924 Han 1985

Handles is a realistic children's novel by Jan Mark, first published in 1983 by Kestrel Books of Harmondsworth, London, with illustrations by David Parkins. Set in the Norfolk countryside, it features a city girl on holiday, who loves motorcycles. Nicholas Tucker calls it "a happy, optimistic work"; Erica escapes "mean-minded relatives" for the "anarchic motorbike-repair outfit in a nearby town".

Mark and Handles won the annual Carnegie Medal from the Library Association, recognising the year's best children's book by a British subject. Thus she became the third writer with two such honors (of seven through 2012), having won the 1976 Medal for her debut novel Thunder and Lightnings. Also set in the Norfolk countryside, it features two boys who love aeroplanes.

Atheneum Books published the first U.S. edition in 1985, retaining the Parkins illustrations.

== Title ==
"Handles" in this book are names with a special significance, a symbol of self-discovery or growing into oneself. The title also plays on the "handles" by which a motorcycle is steered, a symbol of control.

== Plot introduction ==
Erica Timperley, a city girl who loves motorcycles, is bored with her holiday in Norfolk where her Uncle and Aunt grow acres of vegetables. Then she sees a cat with false teeth and discovers Mercury Motor Cycles, an unusual motorcycle repair shop down an alley. There she meets the enigmatic young man "Elsie" Wainwright, who allows her the honour of helping out in the workshop. Apart from beginning to learn the trade, Erica learns a whole new arcane vocabulary and meets an array of curious characters including Bunny and Bill Birdcycle. Eventually she gets a "handle" of her own, and by the end of the summer is determined to become a mechanic.

== Literary significance and reception ==
The realism of Handles has been particularly commended.

From Reading for Enjoyment: 12–15: "This is a richly comic tale ... Jan Mark knows how young people think and talk."

From the New York Times review: "Jan Mark stretches the range of children's books ... she provides for young people the combination of fine prose and strong realism generally reserved for adults."

In Tucker's obituary view more than twenty years later, Handles was a "happy, optimistic work" in which the heroine found in the motorbike-repair shop "the company and interests she had always longed for". This was in marked contrast to three of Mark's earlier works, young adult science-fiction novels set in "a hopeless future", which some critics regarded as "too gloomy for a young audience".

== See also ==
Awards
Preceded by The Haunting	Carnegie Medal recipient 1983	Succeeded by The Changeover
