= Five Little Ducks =

Children's song and finger play

"Five Little Ducks" is an American nursery rhyme. The rhyme also has an associated finger play. Canadian children's folk singer Raffi released it as a single from the Rise and Shine (1982) album. Denise Fleming's 2016 picture book 5 Little Ducks tells a reimagined version of the song. The Wiggles would also release it on their Wake Up Jeff album.

== Lyrics and music ==
Like all folk songs, the exact wording varies. A common variant is:

Five little ducks went swimming one day,
Over the hills and far away.
Mother duck said, "quack quack quack quack,"
But only four little ducks came back.

Four little ducks went swimming one day,
Over the hills and far away.
Mother duck said, "quack quack quack quack,"
But only three little ducks came back.

Three little ducks went swimming one day,
Over the hills and far away.
Mother duck said, "quack quack quack quack,"
But only two little ducks came back.

Two little ducks went swimming one day,
Over the hills and far away.
Mother duck said, "quack quack quack quack,"
But only one little duck came back.

One little duck went swimming one day,
Over the hills and far away.
Mother duck said, "quack quack quack quack,"
But no little duck came back.

Sad mother duck went swimming one day,
Over the hills and far away.
The sad mother duck cried, "quack quack quack,"
And all of the five little ducks came back!

Hold up five fingers
Wave hand as if going up and down a hill
Make opening and closing motion with hand, as if a beak
Hold up four fingers

Repeat actions,
using the corresponding number of fingers
as the numbers count down.

== Music ==
On some recordings of the song, the tune of the lullaby "Hush, Little Baby" is used.

== Translations ==
- German: "Fünf kleine Enten"
- French: "Cinq petits canards"
- Italian: "Cinque paperelle"
- Japanese: "5羽の小さなアヒル"
- Korean: "다섯 마리의 작은 오리"
- Portuguese: "Cinco patinhos"
- Spanish: "Cinco patitos"

== See also ==
- List of playground songs
