= Alchemy (novel) =

2004 novel by Margaret Mahy

- Book cover of 2004 paperback edition
- Author: Margaret Mahy
- Language: English
- Genre: Fantasy novel
- Publisher: CollinsFlamingo
- Publication date: November 4, 2004
- Publication place: New Zealand
- Pages: 271
- ISBN: 978-0-00-713135-8
- OCLC: 55076927
- Preceded by: 24 Hours
- Followed by: Don't Read This!

Alchemy (2004) is a novel for older children by New Zealand author Margaret Mahy.

== Plot summary ==
Roland, a 7th former who has been caught shoplifting, is given an unusual assignment: to spy on a mysterious girl in his class who is studying alchemy. Jess Ferret is an eccentric girl who likes playing with words. However, an enemy from the boy's past wants the girl's power and is using him for information. Roland eventually finds out that he is not unlike Jess and her abilities, but gets them both into a situation which endangers their lives.

== Themes ==
Alchemy has similar themes to two other books by Mahy, The Changeover and The Haunting.

According to Kirkus Reviews, the novel explores the importance of "friendship, family, and the value of everyday life" and contains elements included in some of Mahy's other young adult novels, including "the supernatural presence, the young protagonists with untested powers, the tribute to love and everyday family life, and rich language". Publishers Weekly similarly stated that Mahy "displays her knack for expressing family tensions via supernatural events" throughout the novel.

== Reception ==
Alchemy won the senior fiction section of the 2003 New Zealand Post Children's Book Awards.

Kirkus Reviews found that the novel "offers a thrilling ride", though they stated that "too much is explained and the resolution is quick after a carefully developed plot". Publishers Weekly similarly called Alchemy an "uneven but often gripping novel", noting that " some readers may chafe at the lengthy set-up and the disproportionately hasty wrap-up".
