= Lion in the Meadow =

Lion in the Meadow may refer to:

- A Lion in the Meadow, a 1969 children's book
- "Lion in the Meadow" (Succession), a 2021 episode of the series Succession
