= Enough Is Too Much Already =

1988 children's book by Jan Mark

First edition (publ. Bodley Head)

Enough Is Too Much Already is a short story collection for teenagers by Jan Mark, published in 1988.

The short stories are written entirely in dialogue. They revolve around the exploits of Nazzer, Nina, and Maurice, three sixth form students who are re-sitting their GCSE examinations at school. Other characters include Lisa Pestall, a girl who is yearned after by Nazzer and Maurice, and Nidsworth, an aspiring sixth form eccentric. The spectre of unemployment hangs over the characters, and the book does a good job of evoking re-sit culture and sixth form culture in British schools in the 1980s.

The stories are set in Norwich, England.
