= The Language of Goldfish =

1980 book by Zibby Oneal

- First edition
- Author: Zibby Oneal
- Language: English
- Genre: Young adult fiction
- Publisher: Viking Press
- Publication date: April 14, 1980
- Publication place: United States
- Media type: Print (Hardcover)
- Pages: 179
- ISBN: 9780670417858 (hardcover edition)

The Language of Goldfish is a young adult novel by Zibby Oneal, first published in 1980. It chronicles the mental breakdown of a young teenage girl. Oneal wrote the book in pieces over the course of five years.

== Plot summary ==
Carrie Stokes, age 13, is suffering a mental breakdown due to her fear of change. She is growing up without realizing it, or perhaps blatantly ignoring it, until it gets too hard for her to pretend that everything is the same as it was when she was a young girl. Carrie is a skilled artist and takes lessons with the art teacher at her school. Carrie's parents do not show much support for Carrie's passion for art; every time Carrie shows her parents an art piece, they seem unimpressed. Moira, Carrie's older sister, is a constant reminder that she inevitably has to grow up. She has an anxiety disorder because she is worried about the social graces and rites of passage – such as going to school dances – that growing up entails.

== Reception ==
Laura Berman of the Detroit Free Press found the book "simple and quietly powerful", and suggested that although its language was simple, its content was not. William Menke of the Vincennes Sun-Commercial felt that the protagonist was "hauntingly real" and remarked on Oneal's ability to conjure the feeling of leaving childhood behind. In the St. Louis Post-Dispatch, Arielle North described it as a "strong contender for the Newberry Award". Peter Roop of The Post-Crescent described it as a "carefully constructed and convincing book". Andrea Deakin of the Richmond Review recommended it as a "moving and positive book, which deserves a wide audience". Stephanie Loer of The Boston Globe found it "honest [and] understanding".
