= List of playground songs =

"Row, Row, Row Your Boat"

This is a list of English-language playground songs.

Playground songs are often rhymed lyrics that are sung. Most do not have clear origin, were invented by children and spread through their interactions such as on playgrounds.

== List ==
- "99 Bottles of Beer"
- "Baby Bumblebee"
- "The Burning of the School"
- "Chinese, Japanese, dirty knees"
- "Circle Circle Dot Dot"
- "Comet"
- "Do-Re-Mi"
- "Five Little Ducks"
- "Five Little Monkeys"
- "Great Green Gobs of Greasy, Grimy Gopher Guts"
- "Head, Shoulders, Knees and Toes"
- "Horsey Horsey"
- "If You're Happy and You Know It"
- "I'm a Little Teapot"
- "K-I-S-S-I-N-G"
- "Jingle Bells Batman Smells"
- "London Bridge Is Falling Down"
- "London's Burning"
- "Michael Finnegan"
- "Miss Susie"
- "My Ding-a-Ling"
- "One, Two, Buckle My Shoe"
- "One, Two, Three, Four, Five"
- "On Top of Old Smokey"
- "Fast Food Song" (a song using the names of several fast food franchises)
- "Popeye the Sailor Man" (theme song from the 20th-century cartoon series)
- "Ring Around the Rosie"
- "Row, Row, Row Your Boat"
- "Sea Lion Woman"
- "See Saw Margery Daw"
- "Singing To The Bus Driver"
- "Stella Ella Ola"
- "Ten Green Bottles"
- "The Song That Never Ends"
- "There Was an Old Lady Who Swallowed a Fly"
- "This Old Man" ("Knick-Knack Paddywhack")

== See also ==
- List of nursery rhymes
- Counting-out game
