= Jan Mark =

English writer (1943–2006)

- Born: Janet Marjorie Brisland; 22 June 1943; Welwyn Garden City, England
- Died: 16 January 2006 (aged 62); Oxford, England
- Writing career
- Genres: Children's and young adult
- Notable works: Thunder and Lightnings (1976), Handles (1983)
- Notable awards: Carnegie Medal

Jan Mark (22 June 1943 – 16 January 2006) was a British writer best known for children's books. In all she wrote more than fifty novels and plays and many anthologised short stories. She won the annual Carnegie Medal from the Library Association, recognising the year's best children's book by a British subject, both for Thunder and Lightnings (1976) and for Handles (1983). She was also a "Highly Commended" runner-up for Nothing To Be Afraid Of (1980).

== Life ==
Janet Marjorie Brisland was born in Welwyn Garden City, Hertfordshire, and was raised and educated in Ashford in Kent. She was a secondary school teacher between 1965 and 1971 and became a full-time writer in 1974. She was married once and divorced, and was survived by her daughter Isobel and son Alex.

Mark is known for acutely observed short stories that are concise and show an imaginative use of language. She also wrote novels about seemingly ordinary children in contemporary settings, such as Thunder and Lightnings, as well as science fiction novels set in their own universes with their own rules, such as The Ennead. Her last works include the young adult novels The Eclipse of the Century and Useful Idiots.

The title of Thunder and Lightnings, a story set in rural Norfolk, is a reference to the British RAF jet fighter the English Electric Lightning and in turn inspired the name of a website documenting Cold War British military aircraft.

Jan Mark was popular in Flanders, Belgium, where she participated in an educational project to stimulate teachers of English into using teenage fiction in the classroom. Her Flemish friends devoted a website to her and to her work.

Jan Mark died suddenly at her home in Oxford from meningitis-related septicaemia in January 2006, aged 62.

== Selected works ==
- King John and the Abbot (2006), ISBN 978-1-84299-385-9
- Voyager (2006) the sequel to Riding Tycho, ISBN 978-0-333-99774-1
- Turbulence (2005) ISBN 0-340-86099-5
- Robin Hood All at Sea (2005), ISBN 1-842-99332-1
- Riding Tycho (2005), ISBN 0-340-91320-7
- Useful Idiots (2004), ISBN 0-385-75023-4
- The Eclipse of the Century (1999), ISBN 0-439-01482-4
- Mr Dickens Hits Town (1999), ISBN 0-88776-468-1
- The Midas Touch (1999), ISBN 0-7636-0488-7
- My Frog and I (1997), ISBN 1-903285-97-6
- The Tale of Tobias (1996), ISBN 1-56402-692-2
- They Do Things Differently There (1994), ISBN 0-09-941397-3
- Fun With Mrs Thumb (1993), ISBN 1-56402-247-1
- Enough Is Too Much Already (1988), ISBN 0-370-31094-2
- Zeno Was Here (1988), ISBN 0-374-29664-2
- Fun (1988), ISBN 0-670-82457-7
- Trouble Half-way (1986), ISBN 0-689-31210-5
- Fur (1986), ISBN 0-7445-0478-3
- Handles (1985), ISBN 0-689-31140-0
- Feet and Other Stories (1983), ISBN 0-7226-5839-7
- Aquarius (1982), ISBN 0-689-31051-X
- The Dead Letter Box (1982), ISBN 0-241-10804-7
- Nothing To Be Afraid Of (1981), ISBN 0-06-024087-3
- Hairs in the Palm of the Hand (1981), ISBN 0-7226-5728-5
- Divide and Rule (1980), ISBN 0-690-04012-1
- The Ennead (1978), ISBN 0-690-03872-0
- Under the Autumn Garden (1977), ISBN 0-7226-5347-6
- Thunder and Lightnings (1976), ISBN 0-690-03901-8
