= Invitation to the Game =

1990 novel by Monica Hughes

- First edition
- Author: Monica Hughes
- Cover artist: Laura Fernandez
- Language: English
- Genre: Science fiction novel
- Publisher: HarperCollins
- Publication date: 1990
- Publication place: Canada
- Media type: Print (hardback & paperback)
- Pages: 192
- ISBN: 0-00-639365-9
- OCLC: 56752172

Invitation to the Game is a science-fiction book written by Monica Hughes. It has recently been published as The Game.

The book is a hard science fiction dystopian novel set in 2154, a time when machines and robots perform most jobs and children go to government schools. Because of this, very few people are employed, with many people living on a social welfare system for support. The unemployed people have nothing to look forward to, except various illicit drugs. Some have formed gangs, some are shown to be agitating for political reform (in chapter 5, there is a reference to leaflets being printed up), and many are involved in organized crime of some form or another. The government, possibly the only government in existence at this point, is shown to have complete control over its citizens by restricting the unemployed to designated areas (DAs), and having similar control over the working class.

The working-class people are taught to hate the unemployed citizens, while the unemployed generally want money and employment, in a classic class struggle.

The story is told from the perspective of Lisse, a recent graduate of a government school.

== Plot summary ==
Lisse and her friends are unemployed sixteen year olds after graduating from a respected private government run school, and are dumped in the city along with nearly a hundred others at different locations, called Designated Areas or DAs. At the local Unemployed Rehab Center, the reality of their new lives is spelled out for them. They cannot leave their designated area unless they have a travel pass, something that is apparently quite rare. If they are caught outside their DA, they will be arrested by the Thought Police. As Unemployed, Lisse and her friends receive a monthly stipend of credits that they can only use at Government controlled food stores. Government controlled clothing stores are apparently free for the unemployed, and provide clothing in fantastic and garish colors and styles, a sharp contrast to the drab and simple clothes most employed workers wear. The group speculates that it's to make the unemployed stick out more in their colorless surroundings. Things like travel passes and non food related purchases are restricted to the employed, though it seems that both groups use the same type of credits, since unemployeds can make things to sell to the employed masses, and there is no mention of having to exchange one set of credits for another. The Unemployment center provides the monthly credit stipend, a free dining room that supplies 3 simple meals a day, a dorm that can be used for a very limited amount of time, and locations of rent free housing that the unemployed are allowed to live in. Lisse's group decides to stick together and, by claiming to be a "corporation" that makes things for the employed to buy, are allowed to move into a warehouse. Since they aren't allowed to buy anything but food and cleaning supplies, the unemployed must "scrounge" for everything else they would need, like bedding, furniture, cooking supplies, electronic devices that can be repurposed into other things.

They discover that by day, the area they live in is an unsafe place. By night, however, the unemployed residents come out and are active. Coffee bars, tea houses and discos are open and active at night, along with foot traffic, in colors that make what Lisse's group is wearing look like worker clothes. Lisse and her friends spend several evenings trying to fit into their new world and meet other unemployed groups after they realize that this is their life now. Karen, Trent, Katie, Paul and Alden all have skills that aren't easily translated into the very simplistic lifestyle of the unemployed. They are the catalyst of venturing out into the night to find out how the other unemployed groups spend their lives in their new reality.

The thought police quickly step in to quell any large problems or disputes. For their own safety, they study karate from Katie, one of the housemates. The local library has old fashioned books to help them learn other self-preservation skills to protect themselves and their home. Lisse finds many books of interest there, as she can lose herself in the fantasy of fiction and daydreams of a better life, a better world. Each of the housemates try to add their expertise to the home and keep their group busy. Brad uses his carpentry and mechanical skills, along with materials the group scrounges to turn their warehouse into a protected "castle". Scylla uses her artistic ability to paint murals on the walls of fantastic landscapes and outlandish scenes of fantasy, to help lessen the dreariness of their new existence. They also sell her paintings and Brad's toys to the employed to help bolster the meagre credits they receive every month. On one of their nightly excursions, Lisse and her friends hear of a mysterious 'game', called "The Game" with capital letters. It is known that participants can only be selected, and that anyone who requests to join will always be declined. In the unsafe night, they encounter a suspicious man named Charlie, who offers Lisse's friend and housemate Alden a partnership. Charlie wants to use Alden's skills in chemistry to create mind altering substances and offers the group money, travel and protection. Realizing that Charlie is a powerful gang leader, Alden refuses to help and is attacked on his way home. Thankfully his friends were watching and were able to help before Alden was seriously hurt. The thought police arrive very quickly and arrest Charlie's thugs, but Lisse's group manages to get away. This incident and earlier encounters with other young, unemployed people drive home the helplessness of their existence.

One day, the group gets invited to "The Game", which turns out to be a virtual-reality, full-world simulation. They are given electronic passes and have to travel by train to where The Game is taking place. During the journey, they are treated disdainfully by the employed workers they encounter. Once at The Game's location, they lay on couches and enter the simulated world of The Game. This simulation feels very real and is based in an outdoor wilderness environment and the aim seems to be survival in this different climate. Having little else to look forward to in their lives, the group focuses on training and information gathering during their time between Game sessions. They develop a schedule of regular exercise (consisting of jogging, weight-training and karate), search for information in the local library, and discuss their experiences and motivations with each other. As they progress in The Game, they find that they have a need for a doctor and someone with agricultural knowledge after a game session is ended after their ignorance endangers the group. During their sessions in The Game, they are always brought back to reality if they experience danger, such as eating poisoned berries. Rich and Benta, people they knew from school re-enter their lives, filling those needs, although they initially believe this to be a coincidence. Discovering that their lives and their families lives have been ruined for a "game", Rich and Benta are originally very angry and wish that they had never been remembered by their schoolmates. However, after their next Game session, both Rich and Benta realize what an opportunity The Game is, and their sessions keep them interested and fully invested in the group. In the real world, the group records everything that happens in The Game, mapping the areas they find and keeping track of the flora and fauna they encounter. They also speculate what they would win if they won The Game, thinking about prizes of credits to buy anything they like, including travel.

After a year of training, The Game session abruptly changes and they find themselves with a different initial experience, although they are placed in the same world. They discover that they are not awakened when they are in danger of hurting themselves. At first, they think this means they have progressed to a new, higher level of The Game – but then start to realize that they are never going to "wake up" and they are to stay in their new home forever. Next, they believe they have been sent to another country – but recognize that this cannot be true when they realize the moon wasn't visible. They stay up at night to look at the stars, whose position in the sky makes them discover that they are in a totally different part of the galaxy. This planet is very different from Earth – colorful, fresh, and quiet. This is a new opportunity to create a world without the problems that have destroyed the old: health, political trouble, pollution, unemployment and most of all, the Robots. The Robots had taken over almost every job that had originally been performed by humans, creating a lack of employment that the government wasn't able to stop.

They come to realize that The Game was a kind of training program meant to prepare their group, and others like them, for an off-world colonizing project – a project designed to halt the massive overpopulation their world is suffering. The different start of this phase of The Game, which they thought was a new level, was in fact their transportation to the new world, where they have been left forever. Lisse starts to remember them landing in an egg-like structure. They retrace their steps and rediscover the landing site – this confirms that they have been transported, and that their memories had been tampered with. Eventually, they christen the new world "Prize" – ironically at first – as their new life there is what they have won in The Game.

It is hinted that part of the reason such a group of people were unemployable out of school was to help in the colonization of other worlds, since each seed group would need a variety of talents. Indeed, an early portion of the book reinforces this supposition, as it explains that the prestigious school from which Lisse and her friends graduated once had a 90% job-placement rate, which is now a mere 10% – possibly suggesting that the most qualified graduates are being placed within the Game system rather than the workforce.

Lisse and her group encounter and integrate with another group; they all eventually pair off into relationships. Lisse explains that her original group could not intermarry as they are too close and feel like family. The book ends with Lisse making paper to write a story to the unborn baby she is revealed to be carrying, which she thinks will be a girl – the first child born on Prize.

The first sentence she writes is the first of the book; by this literary device, it is revealed that the book itself is Lisse's recounting of these events of her life.

== Critical reception ==
Invitation to the Game won the Hal Clement Award as the year's best science fiction novel for young adults.
