= Monica Hughes =

British Canadian children's writer

- Born: November 3, 1925; Liverpool, England
- Died: March 7, 2003 (aged 77); Edmonton, Alberta, Canada
- Occupation: Writer
- Spouse: Glen Hughes
- Children: Elizabeth, Adrienne, Russell, Thomas
- Writing career
- Period: 1974–2002
- Genres: Children's science fiction, adventure, and historical fiction
- Notable works: The Keeper of the Isis Light; and its sequels

Monica Hughes OC (November 3, 1925 – March 7, 2003) was an English-Canadian author of books for children and young adults, especially science fiction. She also wrote adventure and historical novels set in Canada, and the text for some children's picture books. She may be known best for the Isis trilogy of young-adult science fiction novels (1980–1982).

== Life ==
Monica Hughes lived in many different countries, including Egypt, Scotland, England and Zimbabwe. She was the daughter of Phylis Fry and E.L Ince. Both her parents worked at the University of Liverpool, where her father was a mathematician and her mother a biologist.

In her school years, her teachers always encouraged her to write and join essay-writing competitions. Hughes attended Edinburgh University from 1942 to 1943. Hughes' academic studies were interrupted as a result of World War II. She joined the Military service, the Women's Royal Naval Service, from the years 1943–1946, cracking German codes. After returning from the war, Hughes went back to university to study Meteorology. She married Glen Hughes on April 22, 1957, and together they had four children.

Before becoming a writer, Hughes had many other careers. She was a dress designer in London, England, and Bulawayo, Zimbabwe between 1948–1949. She was also a bank clerk in 1951, and a laboratory technician from 1952 to 1957.

Having written over 35 books for young people, Monica Hughes is known as one of Canada's best writers for children and young adults. Many of her books are science fiction. Monica Hughes has repeatedly been called "Canada's finest writer of science fiction for children", by critic Sarah Ellis in The Horn Book Magazine.

When not writing or not in school, Hughes was said to enjoy swimming, walking, gardening and beachcombing.

== Writer ==
Hughes wrote about 40 books including more than 20 that the ISFDB covers as speculative fiction novels. Although she spent a large part of her life writing, she was almost fifty when her first book was published. That was Gold-Fever Trail: A Klondike Adventure, a Canadian historical novel (see Klondike Gold Rush).

The Isis trilogy comprises The Keeper of the Isis Light and two sequels, originally published by Hamish Hamilton of London, from 1980 to 1982. Accepting the Phoenix Award for Keeper twenty years later, Hughes discussed her writing process in general and for that work specifically.

WorldCat reports that Invitation to the Game (Toronto: HarperCollins, 1990) is her work most widely held in participating libraries, by a wide margin. It is a dystopian novel set on Earth in year 2154.

Her last book was The Maze (2002). It features a female protagonist and two bullies magically placed in a maze, where they all depend on her for rescue.

== Awards ==
The Keeper of the Isis Light won the 2000 Phoenix Award from the Children's Literature Association as the best English-language children's book that did not win a major award when it was originally published twenty years earlier. That prize is named for the mythical bird phoenix, which is reborn from its ashes, to suggest the book's rise from obscurity.

Invitation to the Game (Toronto: HarperCollins, 1990) won the Hal Clement Award as the year's best science fiction novel for young adults.

Hughes also won the Vicky Metcalf Award, Alberta Culture Juvenile Novel Award, Bay's Beaver Award, and Alberta R. Ross Annett Award.

== Works ==
- Gold Fever Trail: A Klondike Adventure, 1974, a Canadian historical novel
- Crisis on Conshelf Ten, 1975 (Crisis on Conshelf Ten 1)
- The Ghost Dance Caper, 1978
- Earthdark, 1977 (Crisis on Conshelf Ten 2)
- The Tomorrow City, 1978
- Beyond the Dark River, 1979
- The Keeper of the Isis Light, 1980 (Isis 1)
- The Guardian of Isis, 1981 (Isis 2)
- The Isis Pedlar, 1982 (Isis 3)
- Ring-Rise Ring-Set, 1982
- The Beckoning Lights, 1982
- The Treasure of the Long Sault, 1982, illustrated by Richard A. Conroy
- Hunter in the Dark, 1982
- My Name Is Paula Popowich!, 1983, illus. Leoung O'Young
- Space Trap, 1983
- Devil on My Back, 1984 (Arc One 1)
- Sandwriter, 1985 (Sandwriter 1)
- The Dream Catcher, 1986 (Arc One 2)
- Blaine's Way, 1986, a Canadian historical novel
- Log Jam, 1987
- Spirit River, 1988
- The Promise, 1989 (Sandwriter 2)
- The Refuge, 1989
- Invitation to the Game, 1990
- "The Iron-Barred Door", short story in In Context Anthology Two, 1990
- The Crystal Drop, 1992
- Little Fingerling: a Japanese folktale, 1992, retold by Hughes, illus. Brenda Clark —30-page picture book
- A Handful of Seeds, 1993, illus. Luis Garay —32-page picture book
- The Golden Aquarians, 1995
- Castle Tourmandyne, 1995
- Where Have You Been, Billy Boy?, 1995
- The Dirty Car, 1996, illus. Julie Park —16-page picture book
- Lost at the School Fair, 1996
- The Seven Magpies, 1996
- The Faces of Fear, 1997
- Skyways: Copymasters, 1998, by Betty Root and Hughes —resource pack of ten books
- The Story Box, 1998
- What If...?: Amazing Stories selected by Monica Hughes, 1998
- The Other Place, 1999
- Storm Warning, 2000
- The Maze, 2002
