= Crisis on Conshelf Ten =

1975 science fiction novel by Monica Hughes

First edition (publ.Hamish Hamilton)

Crisis on Conshelf Ten is a science fiction novel written by Monica Hughes for young adults, published in 1975. It was her debut sci-fi novel.

== Plot summary ==
Kepler Masterman, a 15‑year‑old raised on the Moon, travels to Earth with his father—the Moon Governor—who is attending a UN summit to seek better treatment for lunar colonists. Struggling with Earth’s stronger gravity, Kepler faints frequently and suffers nosebleeds. To help him adjust and train in a lighter environment, Kepler’s father sends him to live in the undersea colony Conshelf Ten with his aunt and uncle. There he reconnects with his cousin Jon and meets Hilary, Jon’s girlfriend.

Conshelf Ten appears well-run at first—built around kelp harvesting and controlled aquaculture—but Kepler soon realizes it's suffering earnestly under exploitation by land-based governments and corporate entities. The Moon itself endures a similar colonial relationship, relying heavily on Earth without self-sufficiency. Kepler uncovers a small movement of “gillmen,” humans surgically altered to live underwater (gillers). These individuals are marginalized and largely hidden by the colony.

Facing persistent injustice, Hilary and the gillers begin a campaign of sabotage and violent action. Kepler sympathizes with their cause, yet fears their methods could wreck not only the colonies but also undermine his father’s diplomatic mission. Amid growing unrest, Kepler is framed for acts of environmental sabotage that threaten the colony’s food source. Now, besides clearing his name, he must navigate the tension between supporting just reform and stopping destructive violence.

Facing serious personal risk, Kepler works to expose the exploitative systems and avert wider conflict. The novel explores themes such as colonialism, resource abuse, political activism vs. violent resistance, communication breakdown, and the ethical dimensions of human transformation.
