= The Ramsay Scallop =

1994 book by Frances Temple

- Cover of The Ramsay Scallop
- Author: Frances Temple
- Cover artist: Bryan Leister
- Language: English
- Genre: Young Adult; Historical romance
- Publisher: HarperTrophy
- Publication date: 1994
- Publication place: United States
- Media type: Print (Paperback)
- Pages: 310 pages
- ISBN: 978-0-06-440601-7
- OCLC: 33884905

The Ramsay Scallop is a young adult historical romance written by Frances Temple. It is set around 1300 AD, and involves a pilgrimage to the shrine of St. James of Compostella. The novel was first published in 1994.

== Plot summary ==
The Ramsay Scallop has two main characters, Thomas of Thornham and Elenor of Ramsay. They were betrothed to each other when they were young. When Thomas returns broken and disillusioned from the Crusades, he finds the idea of marriage and lordship overwhelming. Elenor dreads the idea of marriage to Thomas, both because she does not like him and because she is afraid of bearing children. She is afraid to bear children because her mother died giving birth to her. Father Gregory sends both of them on a religious pilgrimage to Santiago, Spain, to put the record of Ramsay's sins on the shrine of Saint James. Both of them are relieved because the pilgrimage means the delay of their marriage and a last chance for adventure. On their special pilgrimage, they meet different people, and discover the glorious possibilities of the world around them and within each other. At the end of the book, both of them get married, and they understand each other very well. Both of them realize that people can change and that nobody will be the same.

=== Main characters ===
- Elenor of Ramsay
- Thomas of Thornham
- Father Gregory
- Etienne
- Marthe
- Friar Paul
- Carla
- Guilliamette
- Pipeau
- Martinel
- Jean-Loup
