= Story for a Black Night =

1982 novel by Robert Locke

- First edition
- Author: Clayton Bess
- Language: English
- Set in: Africa
- Publisher: Houghton Mifflin Company, Lookout Press
- Publication date: 1982
- Publication place: United States
- Media type: print
- ISBN: 0618494839
- Website: http://webpages.csus.edu/~boblocke/bess/story.html

Story for a Black Night (ISBN 0618494839) is a 1982 family drama novel by Robert Locke, under the pseudonym Clayton Bess, set in Africa. It won the 2002 Phoenix Award Honor Book award.

== Plot ==
A 40-year-old man tells a story of his childhood, when he was ten, living with his sister, mother and grandmother. When strangers left a baby with smallpox at the house, the family is affected by the disease.

== Reception ==
The book was included in the University of Chicago's Center for Children's Books' volume "The Best in Children's Books: The University of Chicago Guide to Children's Literature, 1979-1984", which called it "a stunning first novel", "taut and tender, deftly structured, vivid".

There is also a link to the efforts of Rose-Marie Vassallo-Villaneau in her two translations into French. After the English version won the Phoenix Honor Award in 2002 for a book that has endured, she decided that she wanted to do a second translation, this time attempting her own French West African dialect.

== Awards ==
- 1982 California Book Awards - (silver) First Novel
- “A Contribution of Cultural Significance” - the Southern California Council on Literature for Children and Young People
- Family Circle - Best Book for Kids
- 2002 Phoenix Award Honor Book

== Play ==
Also from this main page is a link to the 2014 one-act play "PURE HEART in Black of Night" with the author now using his playwright's name Robert Locke.
