= Hunter in the Dark =

1982 novel by Monica Hughes

- First US edition (Atheneum Books)
- Author: Monica Hughes
- Language: English
- Genre: Children's novel
- Publisher: Clarke, Irwin & company (Toronto)
- Publication date: 1982
- Publication place: Canada
- Media type: Print
- Pages: 144 pp
- ISBN: 978-07-7201372-9
- OCLC: 15907501

Hunter in the Dark is a young adult novel by Monica Hughes, first published in 1982 and has been the subject of school study. It is about a boy with leukemia who goes on a hunting expedition.

== Plot summary ==
Mike Rankin, an athletic teenager from a wealthy family, is eager to obtain his big game license to go deer hunting. After suddenly collapsing on the basketball court and being diagnosed with leukemia, he remains determined not to let this hinder his dream hunting trip. He embarks on a journey that forces him to confront the fears overwhelming his life.

== Awards ==
- 1982 - R. Ross Annett Award for Children’s Literature (Writers' Guild of Alberta)
- 1983 - Canadian Library Association, Young Adult Canadian Book Award
- 1983 - American Library Association, Best Books for Young Adults

== Reception ==
"This sensitive and wise story above all excels in resonant dialogue."
