= The Keeper of the Isis Light =

1980 novel by Monica Hughes

- First edition
- Author: Monica Hughes
- Language: English
- Series: Isis trilogy
- Genre: Young-adult science fiction
- Publisher: Hamish Hamilton
- Publication date: 1980
- Publication place: England
- Media type: Print (hardcover, paperback)
- Pages: 136 (first edition)
- ISBN: 978-0-241-10405-7
- OCLC: 472738189
- LC Class: PZ7.H87364 Ke 1980
- Followed by: The Guardian of Isis

The Keeper of the Isis Light is a science fiction novel for young adults by Monica Hughes, published by Hamish Hamilton in 1980. It is the first of three books in the Isis series, or The Isis Trilogy in its omnibus edition. They are set in the distant future on the planet Isis, which revolves around the F5 (yellow-white) star Ra in the constellation Indus (all fictitious).

Keeper won the 2000 Phoenix Award from the Children's Literature Association as the best English-language children's book that did not win a major award when it was originally published twenty years earlier. The award is named for the mythical bird phoenix, which is reborn from its ashes, to suggest the book's rise from obscurity.

Atheneum Books published the first U.S. edition under its Argo Books imprint in 1981.

WorldCat libraries report holding early Danish, German, and Swedish-language editions and a 2002 French-language edition.

== Plot summary ==
Olwen is a young human woman living on the planet Isis as the keeper of the Light (a navigation beacon). Her parents having died, her only companion is a robotic DaCoP (Data Collector and Processor), called Guardian. On Olwen's 16th birthday (10th on Isis), the Guardian tells her that settlers are coming from Earth to Cascade Valley. Olwen is in distress thinking that these settlers will ruin her perfect world.

Guardian explains that she must wear a special protective suit to protect her from the viruses and bacteria the settlers might be carrying. One of the younger settlers, Mark London, falls in love with Olwen, and Olwen wishes Guardian to allow her to see Mark without her suit. Guardian refuses.

One day, Mark overhears Guardian discussing some of Olwen's blood samples with Dr. MacDonald and he thinks Olwen might be in trouble so he climbs up towards her house. When he sees Olwen, he suffers an accident and falls from the top of Lighthouse Mesa. This turns out to be because of his shock at Olwen's appearance under the suit.

Later, Guardian tells Olwen the truth about the death of her parents, and his subsequent care of her as her mother wished. To keep Olwen safe, he changed her genetically, so the ultraviolet rays from Isis' sun, Ra, would not harm her, allowing her to climb to Isis' mountain heights. Shocked at the realization that Mark fell because of her, Olwen tries to enjoy playing with her favourite pet, a dragon-like native animal called Hobbit, when Hobbit is shot by hunting settlers. In rage, Olwen chases the Hunters back to the village. When the settlers see Olwen, they are disgusted by her appearance. Olwen refuses to wear the suit and vows to never go down into Cascade Valley again.

During a sudden solar storm, Olwen rescues a young settler boy, Jody, who was outside in the midst of the storm. The settlers do not know how to react to Olwen saving Jody.

The story ends with Olwen deciding to leave Cascade Valley, and live in isolation with Guardian.

== Themes ==
Accepting the Phoenix Award for Keeper twenty years later, Hughes discussed her writing process in general and specifically for that work. The theme she set out to explore was loneliness. Would one human being living alone from a very young age truly feel lonely? That theme had been inspired by an Edmonton Journal description of the boy in the bubble: "David is a three-year-old who has never known a mother's kiss or the touch of a bare human hand. He lives in a plastic bubble ..." (1 October 1974). Only after five years, she saw how to ask "Are you lonely?" in a science fiction story.

Hughes believed that she learned the answer in the course of writing and expressed it "in the last few words of the book when Olwen realizes that after her death Guardian will be alone. He says, "You must not be distressed. After all, I am no human. DaCops do not have the capacity to be lonely". Olwen watches him leave the room and whispers, "Poor Guardian". For Guardian is not human. I felt I had made the necessary statement. I knew, by the last line, what the book was about. Pain, including the pain of loneliness, is an essential part of the human condition."

Only after a school visit to talk about the book with third-grade children (ages about 8–9), when a girl explained "how bad she felt about the attitude of the colonists to Olwen’s physical appearance" —only then the author saw the theme, "prejudice and the damage it can cause, not only to the recipient, but also to the instigator."
