= The Isis Pedlar =

1982 novel by Monica Hughes

- First edition (Canada)
- Author: Monica Hughes
- Cover artist: John Goslar
- Language: English
- Series: Isis trilogy
- Genre: Young-adult science fiction
- Publisher: Hamish Hamilton (UK)Fleet Books (Canada)
- Publication date: 1982
- Publication place: United Kingdom
- Media type: Print (hardcover, paperback)
- Pages: 121
- ISBN: 0-241-10834-9
- OCLC: 59164775
- LC Class: PZ7.H87364 Is 1983 (first U.S. ed., LCCN 83-2630)
- Preceded by: The Guardian of Isis

The Isis Pedlar is a young adult science fiction novel by Monica Hughes, the third in the Isis series, following The Guardian of Isis. It was first published in 1982.

The book takes place in the distant future on the fictional world of Isis. Nine years have passed since the events of The Guardian of Isis. Mark London and Olwen are now dead.

== Plot summary ==
The leader of the colony is Roger London, Mark London's son. London seems to be nothing like his father, however. Mike Flynn, a Galactic wanderer, spots Isis, and plans to corrupt the inhabitants to obtain the precious firestones. He promises them a Forever Machine, which will supply them with a lifetime of ambrosia, which means they will never have to work for their food again. His daughter, Moira, however, knows that he is simply lying, and tries to stop Mike's evil plans with the help of David N'Kumo, great grandson of Jody N'Kumo. When David and Moira succeed, Jody N'Kumo becomes president, instead of Roger London. Moira decides to stay on Isis, and Guardian, goes with Mike Flynn. Things look much brighter for a future for Isis.
