= The Great White Man-Eating Shark: A Cautionary Tale =

1989 book by Margaret Mahy

- Cover
- Author: Margaret Mahy
- Illustrator: Jonathan Allen
- Language: English
- Genre: Picture book
- Publisher: Dial Press
- Publication date: 1989
- Publication place: New Zealand
- Media type: Print
- Pages: 32
- ISBN: 978-0-8037-0749-8

The Great White Man-Eating Shark: A Cautionary Tale is a 1989 picture book by Margaret Mahy and illustrated by Jonathan Allen. It was adapted into an award-winning 1991 animated short film.

== Plot ==
Norvin, a boy who closely resembles a shark, grows tired of bumping into people while swimming at a local beach called Caramel Cove. In an effort to scare them off, he crafts a dorsal fin out of plastic and pretends to be a shark. When the beachgoers keep returning to the water, Norvin tries the same trick again, but eventually, he attracts the attention of a female shark, who proposes marriage and threatens to bite him if he refuses. A net is erected to keep sharks out of Caramel Cove, but Norvin is left too frightened to swim again for a long time.

== Reception ==
A Publishers Weekly review states, "Mahy's amusing tongue-in-cheek tale meets its match in Allen's droll drawings. Norvin's wonderfully shifty eyes and the vivid expressions on the faces of his victims are certain to tickle funnybones". The picture book was used as an example of irony within children's books in the book Books in the Life of a Child.

The book was adapted into a 1991 animated short film with the same title. The film was nominated for Best Animated Short at the 1992 Chicago International Children's Film Festival. It won Best Children's Animated Production at the Ottawa International Animation Festival, the CINE Golden Eagle Award in 1992, and the Bronze Medal from New York Festivals.
