= Turbulence (Mark novel) =

2005 children's novel by Jan Mark

- First edition (publ. Hodder)
- Author: Jan Mark
- Language: English
- Publisher: Hodder Children's Books
- Publication date: 2005

Turbulence is a 2005 children's novel by Jan Mark. It was shortlisted for the Carnegie Medal. The review by Mal Peet in The Guardian described it as "a dark-tinted comedy of modern manners".

== Plot summary ==
Turbulence relates the story of Clay, a sixteen-year-old girl on the verge of taking her GCSEs. She has a brother, called Jamze, who grunts rather than talks, a little sister who always has to be the centre of attention, a dad who she watches Westerns with, a gran who likes horror films, and a mum who invites The Stranger To Dinner. The stranger's name is Sandor, and he is suave, sophisticated, and ingratiating. One by one, Clay's family and friends find themselves sucked into his life and its many dramas, and it is this situation that makes for much of the turbulence that the title refers to.
