= Robert H. Locke =

American author (1944–2020)

Robert Locke (December 30, 1944 – April 24, 2020), sometimes known by the pseudonym Clayton Bess was an American writer, playwright, and librarian.

== Personal life and death ==
Robert Locke spent three years in Liberia as part of the Peace Corps.

Locke died on April 24, 2020, at the age of 75.

== Works ==
- Books
  - Story for a Black Night (1982)
  - The Truth About the Moon (1984)
  - Tracks (1986)
  - Mayday Rampage (1993)
  - Big Man and the Burn-Out
- Stage plays
  - Rose Jewel and Harmony
  - On Daddy's Birthday
  - The Dolly
  - Murder and Edna Redrum

== Awards and honors ==
- 1982 California Book Awards – (silver) First Novel
- 1987 Best Book for Young Adults – American Library Association
- "A Contribution of Cultural Significance" – the Southern California Council on Literature for Children and Young People
- Family Circle – Best Book for Kids
- 2002 Phoenix Award Honor Book
