= In the Small, Small Pond =

Book by Denise Fleming

- Author: Denise Fleming
- Illustrator: Fleming
- Language: English
- Genre: Children's Literature
- Publisher: Henry Holt and Company, Inc.
- Publication date: 15 September 1993
- Publication place: United States
- Media type: Children's Picture book (hardcover)
- Pages: 32 pp
- ISBN: 978-0-8050-2264-3

In the Small, Small Pond is a 1994 Caldecott Honor Book written and illustrated by Denise Fleming. It is the sequel to Fleming's In the Tall, Tall Grass (1991). In 2001, the film was adapted into an animated short narrated by Laura Dern and released by Weston Woods Studios, Inc.

== Awards and reception ==
Kirkus praised In the Small, Small Pond for its unique rhyme scheme and artful design, especially its paper and typography “… in bold black, beautifully integrated into art created in the process of making paper from pulp dyed in brilliant colors.” In 2013, the Phoenix Picture Book Award selected In the Small, Small Pond as runner-up to its annual award given to a children's book published twenty years ago that did not receive a major award.
