= The Dream Catcher (novel) =

- First edition (publ. Julia MacRae)
- Author: Monica Hughes
- Language: English
- Publisher: Julia MacRae
- Publication date: 1986
- ISBN: 0-86203-241-5 (first edition)
- LC Class: PZ7.H87364 Dr

The Dream Catcher is a 1986 young adult dystopian fiction novel by Monica Hughes.
