= The Guardian of Isis =

1981 novel by Monica Hughes

- First edition
- Author: Monica Hughes
- Cover artist: John Gosler
- Language: English
- Series: Isis trilogy
- Genre: Young-adult science fiction
- Publisher: Hamish Hamilton
- Publication date: 1981
- Publication place: United Kingdom
- Media type: Print (hardcover, paperback)
- Pages: 140
- ISBN: 0-241-10597-8
- OCLC: 15905244
- LC Class: "in process" (first ed., LCCN 82-116637); PZ7.H87364 Gu 1982 (first U.S. ed., 81-10837)
- Preceded by: The Keeper of the Isis Light
- Followed by: The Isis Pedlar

The Guardian of Isis is a young adult novel by Monica Hughes, and is the sequel to The Keeper of the Isis Light. The story takes place on the fictional world of Isis. It is set 55 years after the first book, and now two more generations have been born.

== Plot summary ==
Mark London is now president of the settlement. He has forced the people to abandon all technology and become a simple, agricultural community full of taboos. Upper Isis is now a forbidden zone, because, so they believe, the Guardian put a curse on the mountains, imprisoning the people in their own valley. One boy, Jody N'Kumo, grandson of one of the original settlers, breaks one of the most sacred taboos, and is banished to the land of Guardian, although everyone knows he is simply being sent to his death. However, Jody does not die, and discovers a place called Bamboo Valley. There he meets the Lady Olwen, who was the Keeper of the Isis Light in the times before the colony, and learns the truth about the history of Isis.
