= Sylvia Engdahl =

American science-fiction novelist (born 1933)

- Born: November 24, 1933 (age 92); Los Angeles, California, U.S.
- Occupation: Writer
- Writing career
- Notable awards: Christopher Award (1973); Phoenix Award (1990)
- Website: "Sylvia Engdahl". Archived from the original on 2025-10-09.

Sylvia Louise Engdahl (born November 24, 1933) is an American writer, known best for science fiction. Her debut novel Enchantress from the Stars, published by Atheneum Books in 1970, was the 1971 Newbery Honor Book (see Newbery Medal), was a Geffen Award finalist in 2008, Best Translated YA Book, and she won the Phoenix Award for that work twenty years later.

== Biography ==
Engdahl was born in Los Angeles, California. The Internet Speculative Fiction Database lists 11 books by Engdahl that were published from 1970 to 1981, including two anthologies she edited and three nonfiction books. Her first six books were all published by Atheneum Books. From 1985 to 1995 she taught graduate courses for Connected Education, a pioneer in online education. She lives in Oregon.

In August 2007, Engdahl published a new adult science fiction/visionary fiction novel, Stewards of the Flame: The Hidden Flame Book 1, which she followed with Promise of the Flame: The Hidden Flame Book 2 (September 2009). She followed this duopoly with a trilogy that can be read separately, Defender of the Flame: The Rising Flame Book 1 (April 2013), Herald of the Flame: The Rising Flame Book 2 (October 2014), and her most recent novel, Envoy of the Flame: The Rising Flame Book 3 (June 2021).

== Selected works ==
Among 73 Library of Congress Online Catalog records of books created by Engdahl through 2014 (which may include multiple editions of some), all but the first 16 are nonfiction anthologies she edited while working as a freelance editor.

=== Science fiction novels ===
Engdahl wrote six science fiction novels published from 1970 to 1981 by Atheneum, all of which have been republished in the 21st century. Her latest novels, a duology published in 2007 and 2009 and a trilogy published in 2013, 2014, and 2021 respectively, are adult science fiction, not YA.

- Enchantress from the Stars (1970), illustrated by Rodney Shackell
- Journey Between Worlds (1970), illustrated by James and Ruth McCrea – updated 2006
- The Far Side of Evil (1971), illustrated by Richard Cuffari – updated 2003
- This Star Shall Abide (1972), illustrated by Richard Cuffari (UK title, Heritage of the Star)
- Beyond the Tomorrow Mountains (1973), illustrated by Richard Cuffari
- The Doors of the Universe (1981)
- Children of the Star (2000) – omnibus edition of the Star trilogy: This Star Shall Abide, Beyond the Tomorrow Mountains, and The Doors of the Universe, published as adult SF (the three books had been issued as young adult SF)
- Stewards of the Flame (2007) – first in an adult science fiction duology, The Hidden Flame
- Promise of the Flame (2009)
- Defender of the Flame (2013) - first in an adult science fiction trilogy, The Rising Flame
- Herald of the Flame (2014)
- Envoy of the Flame (2021)

=== Other ===
- Planet-girded Suns: The Long History of Belief in Exoplanets—revised edition (2012), illustrated by Richard Cuffari
- Universe ahead: stories of the future (1975), selected and introduced by Engdahl and Rick Roberson, illustrated by Richard Cuffari
- Anywhere, Anywhen: stories of tomorrow (1976), edited by Engdahl
- Subnuclear Zoo: new discoveries in high energy physics (1977), by Engdahl and Roberson
- Tool for Tomorrow: new knowledge about genes (1979), by Engdahl and Roberson
- Our World Is Earth (1979) - picture book

== Awards ==
- Enchantress from the Stars is the 1971 Newbery Honor Book (see Newbery Medal).
- Enchantress from the Stars was a Geffen Award finalist in 2008, Best Translated YA Book.
- Enchantress from the Stars also won the 1990 Phoenix Award. The latter, from the Children's Literature Association, designated the best English-language children's book that did not win a major award when it was originally published twenty years earlier. It is named for the mythical bird phoenix, which is reborn from its ashes, to suggest the book's rise from obscurity.
- This Star Shall Abide won the 1973 Christopher Award.
- Stewards of the Flame won a bronze medal in the 2008 Independent Publisher (IPPY) Book Awards.

Runners-up and book lists

Enchantress from the Stars has also been runner-up for a few awards and has been named to several book lists.

- 1970: Junior Literary Guild selection; ALA Notable Children's Books
- 1971: Horn Book Fanfare; Newbery Honor
- 1998: New York Public Library 100 Favorite Children's Books
- 2001: Teen People Book Club selection
- 2002: Book Sense Book of the Year finalist, Rediscovery category; CBC Not Just For Children Anymore, Classics category; CCBC Choices
- 2004: ALA Popular Paperbacks for Young Adults
