= The Witch in the Cherry Tree =

Children's book

- Author: Margaret Mahy
- Illustrator: Jenny Williams
- Language: English
- Genre: Children's book
- Publisher: Dent
- Publication date: 1974
- Publication place: New Zealand

The Witch in the Cherry Tree is a children's book written by the New Zealand author Margaret Mahy.
