= 5 Little Ducks =

Children's picture book by Denise Fleming

- Cover of 5 Little Ducks
- Author: Denise Fleming
- Illustrator: Denise Fleming
- Language: English
- Genre: Children's picture book Nursery rhyme Fiction
- Published: 2016 (Beach Lane Books)
- Publication place: USA
- Media type: Print (paperback)
- Pages: 40 (unpaginated)
- ISBN: 9781481424226
- OCLC: 897632447

5 Little Ducks is a 2016 children's picture book by Caldecott Honor recipient Denise Fleming based on the nursery rhyme of the same name.

== Plot ==
Over the course of a week, the ducks go off on a daily adventure with one less returning home each day. On Saturday, they respond to Papa Duck's call, so they can have a day of rest on Sunday, as decided by Mama Duck.

== Reception ==
A review in The Horn Book Magazine of 5 Little Ducks wrote, "Here’s a journey worth taking, filled with the wonder and grandeur of the natural world alongside practical information such as counting and days of the week." Kirkus Reviews in a star review commended Fleming's illustrations and her rewording of the story.

5 Little Ducks has also been reviewed by Booklist, School Library Journal, Publishers Weekly, The Bulletin of the Center for Children's Books, The Wall Street Journal, and the Oneota Reading Journal.

It also appears on picture book reading lists.

It was recognized by the Cooperative Children's Book Council (CCBC).
