= Mama Cat Has Three Kittens =

Children's picture book by Denise Fleming

- Author: Denise Fleming
- Illustrator: Denise Fleming
- Cover artist: Denise Fleming
- Language: English
- Genre: Children's picture book
- Published: 1998 (Henry Holt)
- Publication place: USA
- Media type: Print (hardback)
- Pages: 32 (unpaginated)
- ISBN: 9780805057454
- OCLC: 38356455

Mama Cat Has Three Kittens is a 1998 children's picture book, written and illustrated by Denise Fleming. It is about a mother cat and her three kittens: Fluffy and Skinny who are well behaved, and imitate their mother, and Boris, who naps until the other three rest when he becomes boisterous.

== Reception ==
A review in Kirkus Reviews of Mama Cat Has Three Kittens wrote "The story is charming, but remains almost incidental to Fleming’s eye-rattling artwork in which cotton pulp is transformed into color-drenched handmade paper", and Booklist noted "The text is minimal yet strong, with a repetitive aspect that is perfect for the very young."

Mama Cat Has Three Kittens has also been reviewed by Publishers Weekly, School Library Journal, Horn Book Guides, and the Cooperative Children's Book Center.

It is a 1999 ALA Notable Children's Book, a 1999 Charlotte Zolotow Award commended book, and a 1998 CCBC Choices book.
