= Grab Hands and Run =

1995 book by Frances Temple

- Author: (United States) Frances Temple
- Language: English
- Publisher: HarperTrophy
- Publication date: May 1995
- Publication place: United States
- Media type: Print (hardback & paperback)
- Pages: 165

Grab Hands and Run is a fictional adaptation of a true story written by Frances Temple. The book is written at a fourth-grade level aimed at audiences aged 8 to 13.

== Plot details ==
While growing up, Temple's family sheltered a refugee mother and her two children. The story focuses on the 12-year-old Felipe and his younger sister Romy who flee from the difficult political situation in El Salvador because Felipe's father Jacinto has disappeared. The family had previously developed a contingency plan for such an event which called for them to flee to Canada, which they went through Guatemala, Mexico and the United States. The book focuses on the children having to learn not to provoke the anger of government officials and other people in power. As their trip progresses they realize how precious a home and an intact family are. They finally reach Canada but they find out from a religious man that their father was killed.

== Reception ==
Kirkus Reviews found Grab Hands and Run, "Well wrought, authentic, and compelling", while Publishers Weekly saw that, "Temple's characters are wholly credible" and "Temple's novel may well lead the curious to research the country and politics that inspired her fictional account."
