= The Other Place (novel) =

1999 novel by Monica Hughes

- Author: Monica Hughes
- Language: English
- Genre: Young adult
- Publisher: HarperCollins
- Publication date: August 19, 1999
- Publication place: Canada
- Pages: 192 pp
- ISBN: 0-00-648176-0
- OCLC: 44883856
- LC Class: PZ7.H87364 Ot 1999

The Other Place is a young adult novel written by Monica Hughes, first published in 1999.

It was nominated for the 2000 Silver Birch Award.

== Plot ==
16-year-old Alison Fairweather and her family are living in a not-so-distant future when they are taken from their homes and forced to stay in a penal colony, Habitat W, for five years because of a crime against WOGPO, the World Government. Within a month, Gordie Fairweather, Alison's 8-year-old brother, starts having dreams about "Xanadu", a paradise he believes existed behind the walls of their prison. Gordie succeeds in finding Xanadu, and Alison follows him.

In Xanadu, Gordie and Alison meet Jay, the supposed leader of Xanadu. Alison finds that all of Xanadu's inhabitants, besides Jay, are young children. At first, the children do not approve of Alison because of her age, but they become familiar with Alison, and accept her.

One day, when Alison and the children are eating dinner, Alison catches sight of a wild-looking young woman her age. She discovers that the woman is Kristin, her long-lost friend, who was among the inhabitants of the Habitats. Kristin was not accepted as part of the "Xanadu Family", and has been living in Xanadu, but as an outcast. Kristin does not like Jay, so she and Alison try to follow Jay into his underground home, which he stays in at night.

Kristin and Alison find that Jay was the one calling the children to go to Xanadu, and for each child he named the paradise differently. They also find out that Jay was the one who had the idea of Xanadu, which was originally the "Botany Bay Project". Jay catches Kristin and Alison, but still lets them stay in Xanadu, both as regular inhabitants.

The children living in Xanadu learn to adapt, and Jay is pleased. Also, Jay reveals to Alison and Kristin that he is really a psychologist. As soon as everyone in Xanadu learns to become a real community, Jay leaves to tell WOGPO that everyone in the prison has died. Xanadu is therefore renamed "Jay's World".

== Reception ==
Teacher Librarian called it a "very imaginative tale for fantasy fans."
