= Margaret Mahy Playground =

Playground in Christchurch, New Zealand

Coordinates: 43°31′42″S 172°38′27″E

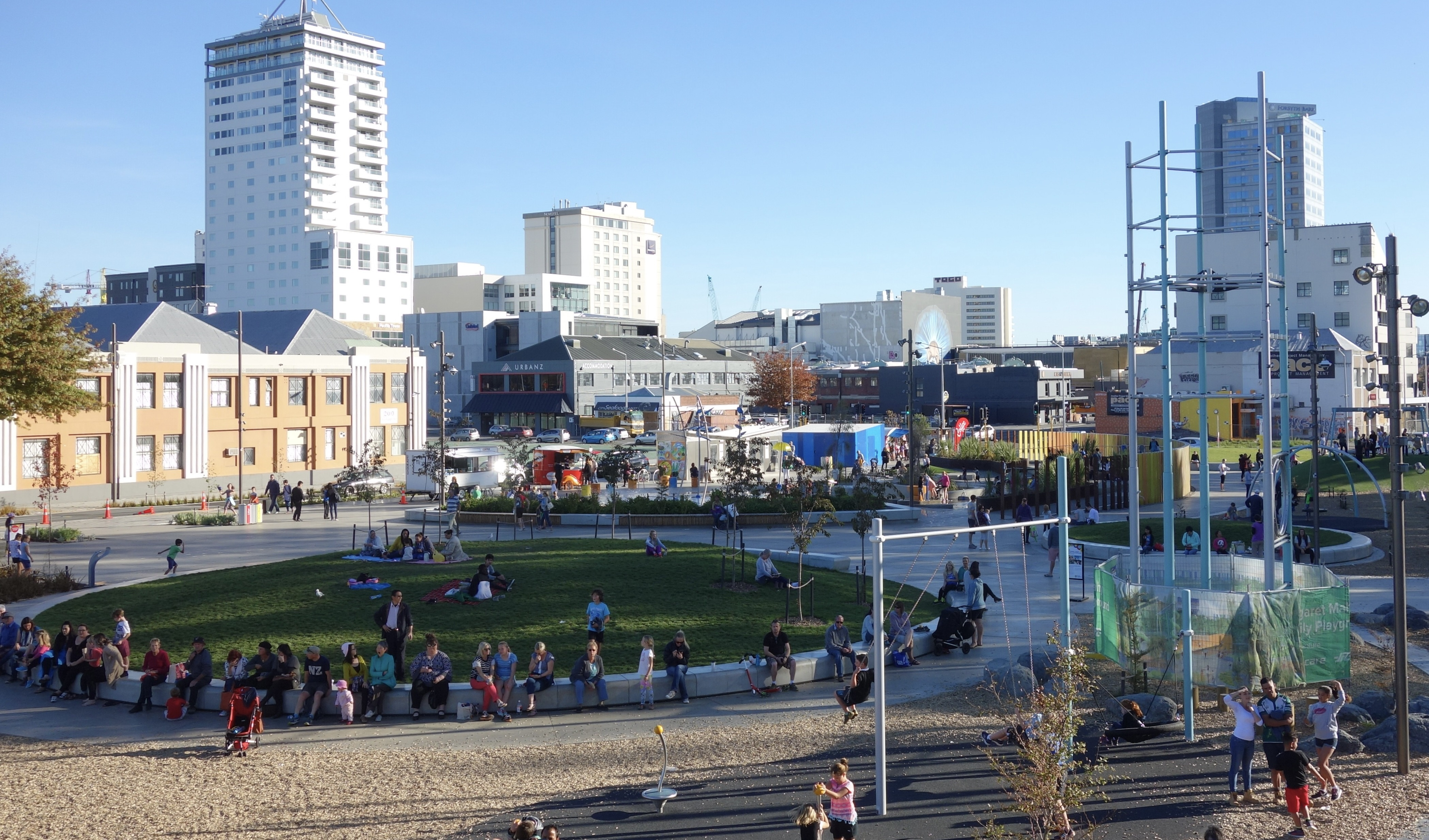
Margaret Mahy Playground in 2016

The Margaret Mahy Playground – Tākaro ā Poi is a playground in the Christchurch Central City on the banks of the Avon River.

Following the 2011 Christchurch earthquake, the government's Recovery Plan had a "city-wide family playground" as one of the elements of the East Frame. The playground opened on 22 December 2015, and it is the largest playground in the Southern Hemisphere. A week prior to the opening, the Canterbury Earthquake Recovery Authority (CERA) issued a press release reporting that the playground had cost NZ$3m to build, and the local newspaper, The Press, reported this with the headline "$3m playground ready to open". But within days, it became clear that the amount publicised by CERA was only a part of the cost; The Press reported that the total project cost exceeded NZ$40m, with NZ$19.6m for land purchase, NZ$1.3m for demolition of buildings, and NZ$20m for land development, including NZ$3m for the playground itself.

The concept for the playground is based on deliberate but managed risk, with the project manager stating: "We accept more risk now in our playgrounds than we had 20 years ago." Having mostly received an enthusiastic response from the public, there was criticism that such an expensive playground did not cater better for children with physical disabilities. The playground is named for Margaret Mahy, New Zealand's famous children's author. After it was reported in January 2016 that the slide got so hot during sunny summer days that it blistered fingers, shade sails were installed. In April 2016, it was reported that additional adventure equipment for the playground had been ordered: climbing towers and "curly whirly slides". An 8 metres (26 ft) spiral slide from one of the towers opened on 26 June and The Press reported "screams of terror and excitement". Two weeks later, the towers and the slide were closed again "over safety concerns".

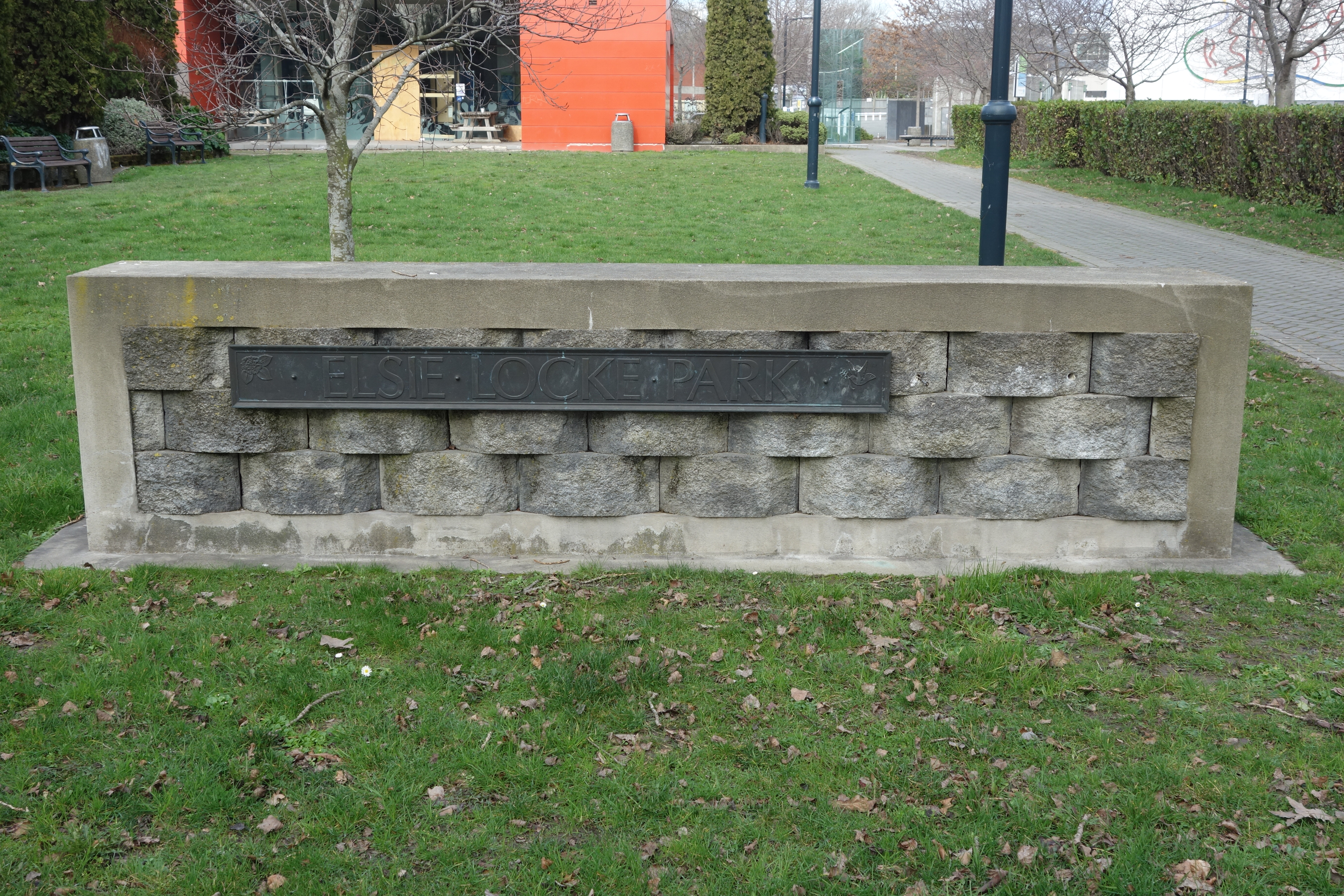
Elsie Locke Park in July 2013

The land incorporates the previous Elsie Locke Park, which was named after the famous activist in 1997 and was Christchurch's only park named after a resident during their lifetime.
