= The Cow Who Clucked =

Book by Denise Fleming

- Author: Denise Fleming
- Illustrator: Fleming
- Language: English
- Genre: children's books picture books
- Publisher: Henry Holt and Company
- Publication date: 2006
- Publication place: United States

The Cow Who Clucked is the title of a children's picture book written by American illustrator Denise Fleming. It was published in 2006 by Henry Holt and Company.

== Summary ==
The narrative revolves around Nelly, a cow who clucks instead of moos after she dreams that she is a mother hen. She spends the day searching for her missing moo and attempting to replicate it. When Nelly asks each farm animal if they have seen her moo, the animals response varies such as "maa, maa" and "quack quack".

== Reception ==
- A Common Sense Media review says, "Subtleties hidden in the background will emerge. Even when families tire of the story, they'll be drawn back to this book by its artistry."
- A Mensha Library review says, "Like the writing, they are simple but masterful. Share this book with toddlers through preschoolers in units about sounds, farms, cows, animals, etc. There are so many uses for this one, and it is another great read aloud from a true master."
- It was reviewed by Horn Book Magazine.
