= Hairs in the Palm of the Hand =

1981 children's novel by Jan Mark

Hairs in the Palm of the Hand is a children's book by British author Jan Mark, published in 1981. It consists of two novellas, Time and the Hour and Chutzpah.

== Time and the Hour ==
The story takes place at an all boys' school with one particular class called 1x. One of the students, Martin Bennett is keeping a record of how much time is being wasted and saved during each school day for fun.

When school troublemaker Addison realizes what Martin is up to, him and some of the other classmates Forbes, Hopkins, Luckhurst and Traill decide to make a wager of how much they can save and waste during the next week with Martin being the bookmaker and Forbes being his supervisor, despite the Deputy Headmaster issuing a gambling ban.

Whoever won would collect his winnings at the 125 bus stop, if it came out even, no one would win.

The next week becomes chaotic mostly with Hopkins (who bet wasting 49 minutes) and Addison (who bet saving 15 minutes) trying to win their bets by incidents and distractions, whilst annoying quite a lot of their teachers.

However eventually all the teachers find out what's going on, especially when Martin accidentally hands in the time wasting sheet instead of his test paper to one of the teachers Mr. Holland by mistake and after a fire drill, no one ends up winning the wager much to Addison's annoyance.

== Chutzpah ==
The story is about a teenage girl called Eileen Skeates who decides to visit a mixed comprehensive named Shepway school. She causes a lot of chaos during her visit and turns the school into an uproar.

Her actions include giving out false names of Julie Smith, Susan Tucker and Deborah Clark when challenged by several teachers, introducing the third year girls to feminist politics and encouraging the sixth form to squat in an unused classroom.

She meets a girl called Lisa Donovan, who thinks she's barmy because of her carefree attitude and the way she keeps causing trouble. Later after a long chat with each other, the teachers realize what Eileen has been up to and one of them catch her. Whilst being taken to the Headmaster's office, she escapes after the teacher is trying to deal with the sixth form incident that Eileen had caused which allows the girl to sneak away. After saying goodbye to Lisa who is with a few other girls she met and telling them why she came to their school, Eileen goes back home.
