= Enchantress from the Stars =

1970 novel by Sylvia Engdahl

- First edition cover
- Author: Sylvia Engdahl
- Genre: Young adult science fiction
- Publisher: Atheneum Books
- Publication date: January 1, 1970
- Awards: Newbery Honor (1971); Phoenix Award (1990)
- ISBN: 978-0-43937489-7

Enchantress from the Stars is a young adult science fiction novel by Sylvia Engdahl published by Atheneum Books in 1970. It was her first book and is set in the Anthropology Service universe (1970 to 1981). Its sequel The Far Side of Evil (1971) features the same heroine, Elana, and the two are sometimes called the Elana series, although the sequel is quite different in tone.

Enchantress was a runner up for the 1971 Newbery Medal, the American Library Association award to the previous year's best children's book by a U.S. author. It won the 1990 Phoenix Award from the Children's Literature Association as the best English-language children's book that did not win a major award when it was originally published twenty years earlier. The award is named for the mythical bird phoenix, which is reborn from its ashes, to suggest the book's rise from obscurity. A new American hardcover edition was issued by Walker and Company in 2001 with a foreword by Lois Lowry and an afterword by the author. Next year it was a finalist for the Book Sense Book of the Year Award in the Rediscovery category.

== Background ==
Engdahl wrote parts of Enchantress in the 1950s; many concepts in the novel date from that time, prior to Star Trek and other 1960s science fiction. In a 1997 journal article, "Enchantress from the Stars: Sylvia Louise Engdahl, Star Trek and Science Fiction", Carol Littlejohn writes that many of the themes and concepts in the novel (such as the peaceful exploration of space without interfering in the history of other planets) are similar to those in Star Trek. However, the author notes that her characters take the rule of non-intervention much more seriously than does Star Trek's crew of the spaceship Enterprise.

== Plot summary ==
Elana belongs to a peaceful, technologically advanced, space-faring civilization called the "Federation", which monitors worlds which are still "maturing", allowing them to grow without any sort of contact or intervention. Elana stows away on a ship in order to accompany her father on a mission to Andrecia where intervention has been deemed necessary because a technologically advanced empire (The Imperial Exploration Corps) has invaded the planet in order to take advantage of its resources. In order to lead a young woodcutter (a native of that planet) against the Corps (without exposing him to the truth about either alien civilization), Elana takes on the role of an enchantress. She trains him and his brother in psychokinesis in an effort to get the Imperial Corps to leave Andrecia peacefully. She also gives him various tools, leading him to believe that they are magical.
