= The Ennead (novel) =

1978 science fiction novel by Jan Mark

- First edition (UK)
- Author: Jan Mark
- Language: English
- Publication date: 1978

The Ennead is a novel by Jan Mark published in 1978 by Viking Kestrel in the UK and Thomas Y. Crowell in the US.

== Plot summary ==
The Ennead is a novel set on the planet Erato, whose provincial inhabitants seek to control overpopulation by limiting the population and restricting immigration from the nearby planet Euterpe.

== Reception ==
Kirkus Reviews states "though the playing out of her theme follows a standard outline, Mark's characters (including several memorable minor ones) are compellingly distinct, and her grim, dead-end village as real as the next one down the pike."

Greg Costikyan reviewed The Ennead in Ares Magazine #2 and commented that "The Ennead is not a nice novel; don't read it to the kiddies. It is, however, cleanly written, witty, and profoundly moving."

== Reviews ==
- Review by Pamela Cleaver (1979) in Foundation, #16 May 1979
- Review by Barbara Krasnoff (1980) in Future Life, June 1980
- Review by Richard E. Geis (1980) in Science Fiction Review, August 1980
- Kliatt
