= Tonight, by Sea =

Book Cover

Tonight, by Sea is a young adult novel written by Frances Temple, published in 1995. It is set in Haiti after the overthrow of liberal president Jean-Bertrand Aristide in 1991. It was published by HarperTrophy.

== Plot summary ==
This is a story about a family's dramatic escape from Haiti by sea which also shows the political and economic issues involved.

Paulie lives in Haiti with her Grann and her uncle, the village coffin maker who has turned his skills to boat building to escape the brutality and starvation that has taken over his homeland. Paulie and other neighbors help with the clandestine project, building the boat Seek Life.

The narrative centers on Paulie, a young girl forced to emigrate from Haiti at the urging of her uncle, who frames the journey as a search for safety and freedom. The departure requires Paulie to leave her familiar environment, including her friend Karyl and her local community. To facilitate the escape, the wooden houses in Paulie's village are dismantled to provide the lumber necessary for the construction of a boat.

Paulie wants to stay and fight. She wants to talk to the reporters from Miami and tell the truth, like Karyl's brother, Jean-Desir. But the macoutes come with their guns and knives to stop them. When Jean-Desir is murdered, Paulie must face the truth: before the soldiers come back to take the boat, they must all leave—tonight, by sea.
