= The Catalogue of the Universe =

1985 romance novel by Margaret Mahy

- First edition
- Author: Margaret Mahy
- Language: English
- Genre: Young adult romance novel
- Publisher: J. M. Dent & Sons
- Publication date: 1985
- Publication place: United Kingdom
- Media type: Print
- Pages: 185 pp (first edition)
- ISBN: 9780460062244
- OCLC: 59234763

The Catalogue of the Universe is a romance novel for young adults by the New Zealand writer Margaret Mahy, first published by J. M. Dent in 1985.

The book follows the evolving relationship between two teenagers: nerdy intellectual Tycho Potter and high school princess Angela May, who despite their differences are best friends. The plot centers around Tycho's observation that things which look as though they "ought" to be simple and symmetric really have a "wobble" to them. This is poignantly demonstrated when Angela's romantic dreams about her father (whom she never knew) are shattered when she actually meets him.

The book won the Phoenix Award in 2005.

== Plot summary ==
Angela May wakes in her bedroom to find her mother, Dido, in the garden trimming the grass using a scythe. Angela calls out to her mother and asks her to share the story of how she and her father met, and her subsequent birth. Dido shares the story of how she was in love with a married man, and he with her, but he could not leave his family. However, Dido did not want to be left with nothing, so became pregnant with Angela. Angela asks if Dido would want to be with him now, but her mother dismisses the notion.

Meanwhile, at Tycho's house his family receive a phone call from his sister Africa, who has had a fight with her husband and wishes to leave him. However, before the family have a chance to go collect her, she rings up having changed her mind. Richard, Tycho's brother, teases Tycho about his “girlfriend” Angela but Tycho insists they are just friends. Angela does indeed come to see Tycho that morning, under the pretence of him offering her a lift to a school event. Angela wishes to play truant but Tycho refuses.

After they have finished, Angela insists the two go somewhere because she has something important to show Tycho. She takes him to an expensive cafe where they wait, though Angela will not tell Tycho what for. Eventually a man enters the establishment and Tycho immediately notices the resemblance between him and Angela - his is in fact Roland Chase, Angela's father, and owner of a large company. Angela stands up and her father, previously unaware she was there, catches sight of her. He does not look pleased.

Angela decides to go and see Roland Chase and confront him. Tycho tries to dissuade her, but eventually agrees to drive her there and wait for her. Her father sees her waiting for him, and takes her into his office. However the meeting does not go well. Roland Chase implies that she may not even be his daughter, as her mother had been involved with many men. He has never thought about her and never given the family any money, even though Dido had claimed he had. it also turns out that he is not married and has no official children.

Whilst Angela is there, Roland Chase's mother (and Angela's biological grandmother) bursts into the office, insisting on seeing her son. Roland introduces the two, and the grandmother seems interested in learning more about Angela. It turns out the two share the same name. Angela is still upset and angry, and leaves.

Angela calls her mother at work and tells her what has happened. Angela is extremely angry and tells her mother to drive her car off the dangerous road that the two live on. Tycho finds her in a telephone box. She refuses to tell him what has happened, and so Tycho gives her some money and leaves her be.

Tycho returns home, where he uses the excuse of wanting to see the occultation of two of Jupiter's moons to get out of going to his sister's for a party that evening. After they have left, he calls Dido, but Angela has not returned yet. He later receives a call from Richard telling him that his father was taken ill, and the family would be staying the night at Africa's.

After hanging up, Tycho turns to find Angela in his house, looking a mess. She tells him how after the meeting with her father, she wanted to do something to make her feel degraded. She went to a rough bar, where she had a man buy her several Fallen Angel cocktails. Leaving the bar she went with him to the river bank intending to have sex with him, but she changed her mind and ran off through the river.

Angela then reveals to Tycho that she is a virgin, something that not many people would think about her. They discuss why she had kept this a secret, and she said she liked having something about herself other people did not know. Tycho sends her to go and phone her mother, but on the way to Angela sees a present that she had bought Tycho on the table. It is her own T-shirt bearing the legend "The Ionians Rule". This is her way of telling Tycho that she wishes to be with him, and the two spend the night together.

In the morning the two remember they had not called Dido and are unable to get a response when they try. They decide to walk to Angela's house, as Tycho does not have the car and no buses run on a Sunday. As they are walking up the road they see a car veer off the bridge and down the slope and Angela believes this may be her mother's car. They run off down the slope to investigate.

However the vehicle was actually that of Angela's neighbours Phil and Jerry Cherry. Phil had been thrown clear, but Jerry was trapped inside the vehicle. Tycho manages to get Jerry clear, but only just, and the car explodes. Dido then arrives and an ambulance soon follows. Tycho, who received burns when saving Jerry, is taken to hospital as well, and Angela leaves with her mother.

Arriving home, Tycho finds that his sister Africa and her child are there. She has been having an affair and has now left her husband. A reporter turns up at the door, and suddenly the family realise Tycho is actually injured, and want to know what has happened.

At home, Angela receives a phone call from her paternal grandmother, who wishes to get to know her better, but Angela is not interested. Dido tells Angela that her grandmother had actually given her money to have an abortion, which Dido had instead used to buy things for a newborn. Tycho comes to visit her and Angela asks him not to tell Dido about their relationship, but the way the two behave makes it obvious.

== Awards ==
The Catalogue of the Universe won the 2005 Phoenix Award from the Children's Literature Association as the best English-language children's book that did not a major award when it was originally published twenty years earlier. It is named for the mythical bird phoenix, which is reborn from its ashes, to suggest the book's rise from obscurity.
