= The Changeover =

1984 young adult novel by Margaret Mahy

- First edition
- Author: Margaret Mahy
- Cover artist: Bruce Hogarth (depicted)
- Language: English
- Genre: Young adult fantasy, supernatural fiction
- Publisher: J. M. Dent & Sons
- Publication date: 1 May 1984
- Publication place: New Zealand
- Media type: Print (hardcover)
- Pages: 214 pp (first edition)
- ISBN: 0-460-06153-4
- OCLC: 12449148
- LC Class: PZ7.M2773 Ch 1984

The Changeover: a Supernatural Romance is a low fantasy novel for young adults by Margaret Mahy, published in 1984 by J. M. Dent in the U.K. It is set in Christchurch in the author's native New Zealand.

Mahy and The Changeover won the annual Carnegie Medal from the Library Association, recognising the year's best children's book by a British subject. Thus she became the fourth writer with two such honours (of seven through 2012), having won the 1982 Medal for The Haunting.

Atheneum Books published a U.S. edition within the year.

WorldCat reports that The Changeover is Mahy's novel most widely held in participating libraries, second among all her works behind a picture book collaboration, The Seven Chinese Brothers (1989).

== Plot introduction ==
The Changeover is set in a fairly new suburb of Christchurch called Gardendale; Mahy had renamed the suburb of Bishopdale for her book. It has a fairy-tale plot, with a devoted sister risking her life to save her bewitched brother. In some respects a coming-of-age story, it is also an unconventional romance between an aloof and difficult boy who happens to be a male witch and a strong-willed, psychically sensitive schoolgirl.

== Plot summary ==
Laura Chant has one of her "warnings", a premonition that something is about to happen, but is forced to ignore it and go to school as usual. On the way home, she and her younger brother Jacko encounter the sinister Carmody Braque, who 'playfully' stamps Jacko's hand, the stamp appearing as an image of his face.

As Jacko becomes increasingly ill, Laura believes he has been possessed. She seeks the help of Sorensen "Sorry" Carlisle, recognized by her as a witch in hiding though to others he seems just a painfully well-behaved school prefect who photographs birds as a hobby. She learns that Braque is an ancient being who consumes the life force of others to keep himself alive. Sorry's grandmother Winter, one of a long line of witches, recommends that Laura should "changeover" from her normal life, to become a witch or "woman of the moon" herself. She would then be in a position to trick an unwary Braque into putting himself in her power. Although warned that the changeover can be dangerous, Laura is determined to save her brother, now very near death.

Laura experiences the changeover as a spirit journey through a dark forest, which is also at the same time Gardendale. The Carlisle witches help her through it, for their own reasons, and she emerges from the perilous passage with the power of nature and imagination awakened in her.

Taking Sorensen along to mask her new power, Laura confronts Braque and succeeds in gaining power over him and breaking his hold on Jacko. At first intending to make the evil entity suffer, she rejects the dark temptation and instead ends his unnatural existence.

== Characters ==
- Laura Chant, a 14-year-old schoolgirl who lives in Gardendale, a suburb of Christchurch, and is sensitive to the supernatural
- Jacko Chant, Laura's 3-year-old brother
- Kate Chant, Laura's mother, manager of a bookshop in the Gardendale Mall
- Stephen Chant, Laura and Jacko's father, who lives in the north
- Julia Chant, Stephen's new wife, pregnant with their first child
- Mrs Fangboner, Jacko's babysitter
- Chris Holly, Kate's new boyfriend, first seen as a customer at the bookshop, a Canadian librarian working at the Christchurch Central Library
- Sorensen Carlisle, known as Sorry, an 18-year-old prefect at Laura's school, a male witch. Fostered as a baby, he returned to the Carlisle home aged 16
- Miryam Carlisle, Sorenson's mother, a witch
- Winter Carlisle, Miryam's mother, a witch
- Carmody Braque, a vampiric lemur masquerading as an antique dealer

== Literary significance and reception ==
The novel was awarded the Carnegie Medal for 1984 and was also the ALA Best Book for Young Adults, the School Library Journal Best Book of the Year, the Booklist Editor's Choice and a Boston Globe-Horn Honour Book.

It was described by The Guardian as "a seamless combination of supernatural thriller and entirely authentic teenage story", and by the School Library Journal as "an extraordinarily rich and sensitive novel" with a beautiful but ornate style. In the re-release of the novel in 2007, the author notes the book's significance as having been both her first young adult novel and the first in which she effectively evoked the New Zealand setting. She also observes its lack of adolescent idiom, which gives it a timeless quality. It is recommended by several reading books, particularly for teenage girls.

The Changeover has been the subject of scholarly essays, especially dealing with its fairy tale elements.

== Film adaptation ==
A feature film based on the novel, starring Timothy Spall, Melanie Lynskey, Lucy Lawless, Nicholas Galitzine, Erana James and Kate Harcourt, was released in New Zealand on 28 September 2017.

Awards
Preceded by Handles	Carnegie Medal recipient 1984	Succeeded by Storm
