= Frances Temple =

American writer

Frances Temple (August 15, 1945 – July 5, 1995) was a primary school teacher, a writer of award-winning children's stories and young adult novels and illustrator. Her carefully researched novels focus on the political and economic travails of young people across the globe. Her works have dealt with poverty and oppression in contemporary El Salvador, two novels cover strife in contemporary Haiti, one is a retelling of a folk tale from Jamaica and two novels — part of a projected trilogy — are set in the Middle Ages, in Spain and Morocco.

== Biography ==
Frances Nolting Temple was born on August 15, 1945, in Washington, DC. She grew up in Virginia, France and Vietnam as the daughter of the former U.S. ambassador to Vietnam, Frederick Nolting, Jr. She was in the Peace Corps in Jamaica and Ethiopia from 1969 to 1971. She died on July 5, 1995, from a heart attack.

== Awards and recognition ==
In 1993, Taste of Salt: A Story of Modern Haiti was awarded the Jane Addams Children's Book Award for a Book for Older Children.

Tonight, by Sea was the 1995 winner of The Americas Award, given by the Consortium of Latin American Studies Programs (CLASP).

The Frances Nolting Temple Prize for Teaching was established in 1996 at Hobart and William Smith Colleges "to recognize her dedication to teaching, children, and the human spirit".

== Books ==
- Frances Temple, Taste of Salt: A Story of Modern Haiti (1992)
- Frances Temple, Grab Hands and Run (1993)
- Charles A. Temple, Ruth Nathan, Frances Temple, The Beginnings of Writing (1993)
- Frances Temple, The Ramsay Scallop (1994)
- Frances Temple, Tiger Soup: An Anansi Story from Jamaica (1994)
- Frances Temple, Tonight, by Sea (1995)
- Frances Temple, The Beduins' Gazelle (1996)
