= Thunder and Lightnings =

1976 children's novel by Jan Mark

- First edition
- Author: Jan Mark
- Illustrator: Jim Russell
- Language: English
- Genre: Children's realist novel
- Publisher: Kestrel Books
- Publication date: April 1976
- Publication place: United Kingdom
- Media type: Print
- Pages: 174 pp (first edition)
- ISBN: 0-7226-5195-3
- OCLC: 16292884
- LC Class: PZ7.M33924 Th 1979

Thunder and Lightnings is a realistic children's novel by Jan Mark, published in 1976 by Kestrel Books of Harmondsworth in London, with illustrations by Jim Russell. Set in Norfolk, it features a developing friendship between two boys who share an interest in aeroplanes, living near RAF Coltishall during the months in 1974 when the Royal Air Force is phasing out its English Electric Lightning fighters and introducing the SEPECAT Jaguar.

Mark won the annual Carnegie Medal from the Library Association, recognising the year's best children's book by a British subject. She also won a prize for children's novels by new writers, sponsored by The Guardian newspaper. (Note: This was not the venerable Guardian Children's Fiction Prize (1966 to present), which annually recognises a book by someone who has not yet won the award; Jan Mark never won that. Evidently it was co-sponsored by a publisher; 2006 obituaries in The Guardian and The Independent named it "Kestrel/Guardian" and "Penguin/Guardian" respectively.)

Atheneum Books published the first U.S. edition in 1979, retaining the Russell illustrations.

== Origins ==
Jan and Neil Mark and their daughter Isobel moved to Norfolk in 1973 and lived "directly under a flight-path, with Lightning fighters from RAF Coltishall taking off 200 feet above the roof". According to her obituary in The Guardian, she wrote her debut novel Thunder and Lightnings for "the Kestrel/Guardian prize for a children's novel by a previously unpublished writer", and won it.

== Plot summary ==
Andrew Mitchell moves to Tiler's Cottage in East Anglia. He goes to his new school and meets Victor Skelton in General Studies class. The two slowly become friends and do things together, including going to RAF Coltishall to see the aeroplanes, which are English Electric Lightnings. Victor is devastated when he discovers that his beloved Lightnings are to be replaced with Jaguars.

== Notes ==
Awards
Preceded by The Machine Gunners	Carnegie Medal recipient 1976	Succeeded by The Turbulent Term of Tyke Tiler
