= Denise Fleming =

American writer

Denise K. Fleming (January 31, 1950) is an American creator of children's picture books. She was born in Toledo, Ohio. She graduated in illustration (after a change from advertising design) from Kendall College of Art and Design in Grand Rapids, Michigan.

Her first book, In the Tall, Tall Grass, was published by Henry Holt and Company in 1991. According to one library summary, "Rhymed text (crunch, munch, caterpillars lunch) presents a toddler's view of creatures found in the grass from lunchtime till nightfall, such as bees, ants, and moles." It was critically well received and its sequel, In the Small, Small Pond (Holt, 1993), was a runner-up for the 1994 Caldecott Medal.

Twenty years later, In the Small, Small Pond was runner-up for the inaugural, 2013 Phoenix Picture Book Award. The Phoenix Awards recognize the best children's books published twenty years earlier that did not win major contemporary awards.

Her other books include The Cow Who Clucked, The First Day of Winter, Underground, and 5 Little Ducks.

== Awards and honors ==
underGROUND is a Junior Library Guild book.

Awards and honors for Fleming's writing
Year	Title	Award/Honor	Result	Ref.
1994	In the Small, Small Pond	Caldecott Medal	Runner-up	
1998	Time to Sleep	Charlotte Zolotow Award	Commended	
1999	Mama Cat Has Three Kittens	Charlotte Zolotow Award	Commended	
2003	Alphabet Under Construction	ALSC Notable Children's Books	Selection	
2004	Buster	Charlotte Zolotow Award	Commended	
2013	In the Small, Small Pond	Phoenix Picture Book Award	Runner-up	
2013	underGROUND	Charlotte Zolotow Award	Commended	

== Publications ==
- In the Tall, Tall Grass (1991)
- Count! (1992)
- Lunch (1992)
- In the Small, Small Pond (1993)
- Barnyard Banter (1994)
- Where Once There Was a Wood (1996)
- Time to Sleep (1997)
- Mama Cat Has Three Kittens (1998)
- The Everything Book (2000)
- Pumpkin Eye (2001)
- Alphabet Under Construction (2002)
- Buster (2003)
- The First Day of Winter (2005)
- The Cow Who Clucked (2006)
- Beetle Bop (2007)
- Buster Goes to Cowboy Camp (2008)
- Sleepy, Oh So Sleepy (2010)
- SHOUT! Shout it out! (2011)
- underGROUND (2012)
- Go, Shapes, Go! (2013)
- Maggie and Michael Get Dressed (2016)
- 5 Little Ducks (2016)
- This Is the Nest That Robin Built (2018)
