= Taste of Salt =

1992 young adult novel by Frances Temple

Taste of Salt: A Story of Modern Haiti
- Author: Frances Temple
- Language: English
- Genre: Young adult novel
- Published: 1992
- Publication place: United States
- The novel features a young boy, Djo, and his experiences in Haiti, including his survival and encounters with street gangsters, known as Macoutes, as well as Jean-Bertrand Aristide's influence on the story.

Taste of Salt: A Story of Modern Haiti is a 1992 young adult novel written by Frances Temple. It is set in Haiti, and although most of the characters and events are fictional, the background is real, and Jean-Bertrand Aristide is a real person. The story tells about a young boy, Djo, who is injured in a hospital bombing by the street gangsters, or Macoutes. This book is not just about political events in Haiti; it also has many parts about discovering hope, faith, and trust.

== Plot ==
The story starts with Djo in the hospital. Jeremie has been sent by Titid (Aristide) to tape Djo as he tells his life story. Djo talks about his life from the beginning since he was a child. The story continues with his various jobs, the poverty in Haiti, how Djo had to work as a slave.

The second part of the story has to do with Jeremie. Jeremie is a girl who has been educated in a nun school. She always wanted to work her way out of the slums of Haiti and live somewhere else. After she meets Djo and listens to his story, she realizes she must stay in Haiti and try to make Haiti a better place.

The third part returns to Djo's story. Djo continues from where he left off at part one and talks about his life leading up to being hospitalized. This includes how he escaped from slavery, and his escapades with Titid leading up to the firebombing.

== Reception ==
Publishers Weekly called Taste of Salt an "arresting first novel [that] presents a powerful fictional portrait of the poverty and oppression in contemporary Haiti". They highlighted how Temple "successfully created a martyr for the people" with the character Djo, as well as how "his narrative contains a smattering of social and political insights as well as excerpts from Aristide's motivational writings and speeches".

Kirkus Reviews referred to the novel as "poignant", noting that it is "doubly so, considering subsequent events". They further wrote, "In voodoo lore, a pinch of salt can give a zombie self-awareness and escape; here, Temple offers such a taste while celebrating the revolutionary movement that has given the Haitian people a taste of escape from oppression."
