= Zibby Oneal =

American writer (1934–2025)

- Born: Mary Elizabeth Bisgard; March 17, 1934 Omaha, Nebraska
- Died: January 23, 2025 (aged 90) Ann Arbor, Michigan
- Education: Stanford University; University of Michigan, BA English 1968
- Period: 1971–2016
- Notable works: The Language of Goldfish

Zibby Oneal (born Mary Elizabeth Bisgard; March 17, 1934 – January 23, 2025) was an American author of young adult fiction. Raised in Omaha and based in Ann Arbor, Michigan for much of her life, Oneal is known for a series of three novels published in the 1980s that address topics of mental health, grief, and identity.

== Biography ==
Mary Elizabeth Bisgard was born on March 17, 1934 in Omaha, Nebraska, the daughter of Dr. James Dewey Bisgard and Mary Elizabeth Dowling Bisgard. Nicknamed "Zibby" from before birth, Bisgard attended fourth grade through high school at Brownell Hall, a private girls' school in Omaha. As a child, she developed a preference for character-driven storytelling in response to her grandfather's love of adventure fiction, which she viewed as too plot-driven.

Bisgard studied English at Stanford University, following through on her desire to leave Omaha and seek a coeducational, high-quality university. She left her studies at Stanford in 1954 and married Robert Oneal in 1955, after meeting him at a wedding in Omaha. Robert's medical residency brought the couple to Boston, where Zibby took night courses at Boston University. They moved to Ann Arbor, Michigan in 1957, where Robert started a private plastic surgery practice.

The couple's two children were born in Ann Arbor in 1958 and 1960, and Oneal finished her bachelor of arts degree in English at the University of Michigan in 1968. In 1971, she began as a lecturer in the university's College of Literature, Science, and the Arts, teaching Great Books.

Oneal's first book, War Work, is a semi-autobiographical novel about the United States home front during World War II. Oneal wrote War Work as a commentary on the Vietnam War anti-war movement, writing in 1983 that "Children are different now. They're amazed that anyone could ever have believed in war." War Work won the 1972 Friends of American Writers Young People's Literature Award.

In the early 1980s, Oneal wrote three young adult novels addressing issues of mental health, grief, and identity. The Language of Goldfish (1980) and A Formal Feeling (1982) were described by Contemporary Literary Criticism as "candid, unsentimental portrayals of teenagers with emotional difficulties." In Summer Light (1985) discusses the relationship between a father and daughter whose identities are in conflict. All three works place some of their storylines on islands, which Oneal described in a 1986 interview as her "responsibility to make children understand that adolescence is a self-absorbed world."

In the late 1980s, Oneal published an illustrated biography of Grandma Moses, her first non-fiction work. Her final book was Paralyzing Summer: The True Story of the Ann Arbor V.A. Hospital Poisonings and Deaths (2016), an account of the 1975 Ann Arbor Hospital murders written with surgeon S. Martin Lindenauer. Oneal died on January 23, 2025 at her home in Ann Arbor.

== Selected works ==
- Oneal, Zibby (1971). War Work. Illustrated by George Porter. New York: Viking Press. ISBN 978-0-670-75000-9.
- — (1972). The Improbable Adventures of Marvelous O'Hara Soapstone. Illustrated by Paul Galdone. New York: Viking Press. ISBN 978-0-670-39424-1.
- — (1980). The Language of Goldfish. New York: Viking Press. ISBN 978-0-670-41785-8.
- — (1983). A Formal Feeling. New York: Ballantine. ISBN 978-0-670-32488-0.
- — (1985). In Summer Light. New York: Viking Kestrel. ISBN 978-0-670-80784-0.
- — (1987). Grandma Moses, Painter of Rural America. Illustrated by Donna Ruff. New York: Puffin Books. ISBN 978-0-14-032220-0.
- —; Lindenauer, S. Martin (2016). Paralyzing Summer: The True Story of the Ann Arbor V.A. Hospital Poisonings and Deaths. Ann Arbor: University of Michigan Press. ISBN 978-0-472-05321-6.
