= Margaret Mahy =

New Zealand children's writer (1936–2012)

Margaret Mahy ONZ
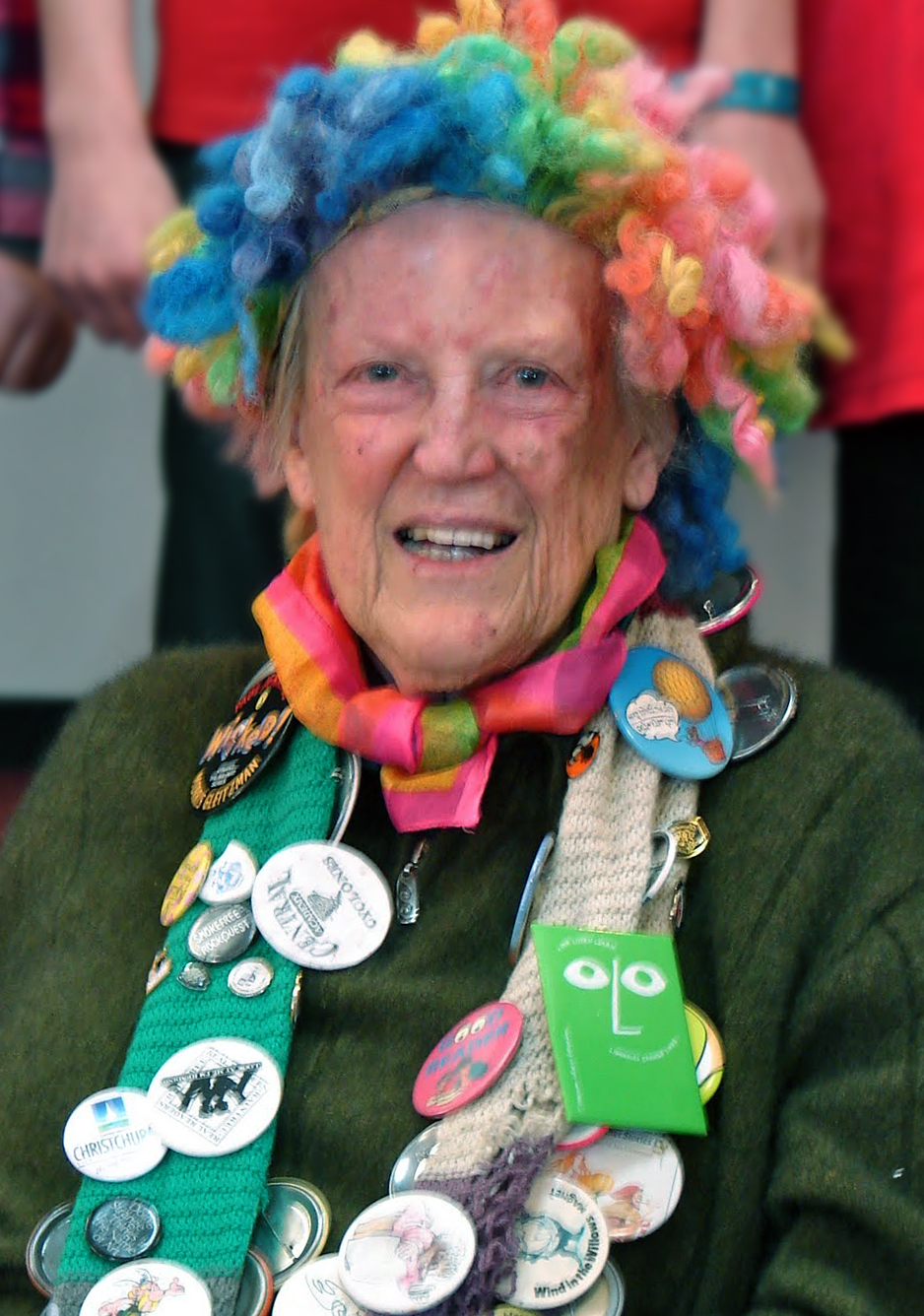
- Mahy, with her characteristic rainbow wig, at the Kaiapoi Club, July 2011
- Born: 21 March 1936; Whakatāne, New Zealand
- Died: 23 July 2012 (aged 76); Christchurch, New Zealand
- Occupations: Writer, librarian
- Writing career
- Language: English
- Period: 1969–2012
- Genres: Children's picture books, supernatural fiction
- Notable works: A Lion in the Meadow; The Haunting; The Changeover
- Notable awards: Carnegie Medal; 1982, 1984; Hans Christian Andersen Award for Writing; 2006

Margaret Mahy ONZ (21 March 1936 – 23 July 2012) was a New Zealand author of children's and young adult books. Many of her story plots have strong supernatural elements but her writing concentrates on the themes of human relationships and growing up. She wrote more than 100 picture books, 40 novels and 20 collections of short stories. At her death she was one of thirty writers to win the biennial, international Hans Christian Andersen Medal for her "lasting contribution to children's literature".

Mahy won the annual Carnegie Medal twice. It recognises the year's best children's book by a British subject, and she won for both The Haunting (1982) and The Changeover (1984). (As of 2012 just seven writers have won two Carnegies, none three.) She was also a highly commended runner up for Memory (1987). (Note: Today there are usually eight books on the Carnegie shortlist. CCSU lists 32 "Highly Commended" runners up from 1966 to 2002 but only three before 1979 when the distinction became approximately annual. From 1979 there were 29 "HC" books in 24 years including Mahy alone in 1987.)

Among her children's books, A Lion in the Meadow and The Seven Chinese Brothers and The Man Whose Mother was a Pirate are considered national classics. Her novels have been translated into Te Reo Māori, German, French, Spanish, Dutch, Norwegian, Danish, Swedish, Finnish, Italian, Japanese, Catalan and Afrikaans. In addition, some stories have been translated into Russian, Chinese and Icelandic.

The Margaret Mahy Playground in the Christchurch Central City is named in her honour.

== Early life ==
Mahy was born in 1936, the eldest of five children. She was raised in her birthplace of Whakatāne. Her father, Francis George Mahy, was a bridge builder and often told his children adventure stories which later influenced Mahy's writing. Mahy's mother Helen Penlington was a teacher. She was regarded as a 'slow learner', and particularly hated mathematics. Her first published story was "Harry is Bad", written at age seven (published in the children's page of the Bay of Plenty Beacon). Later she showed it to children when she visited schools, to let them know that they could write stories at any age.

She went to the local high school, where she was acknowledged as a talented swimmer.

== Education ==
Mahy completed her B.A. at Auckland University College (1952–1954) and Canterbury University College, graduating in 1955. In 1956 she trained at the New Zealand Library School, Wellington as a librarian.

== Personal life ==
From around 1965, Mahy lived at Governors Bay on the Banks Peninsula, Canterbury, in the South Island of New Zealand. She was a solo mother and raised two daughters there. At age 62, Mahy had her right shoulder tattooed with the picture of a skull with a rose in its teeth. She was writing about a person being tattooed and considered the tattoo research to enable her to describe the experience convincingly.

In 2007, Mahy adopted a cavoodle puppy she named Honey, because of her colour. Mahy died at the Nurse Maude Hospice in St Albans, Christchurch on 23 July 2012, aged 76. She had been diagnosed with an inoperable cancerous jaw tumour in April 2012 and had been moved to a hospice about nine days before her death.

Her final book Tale of a Tail, published posthumously in 2014, was commissioned by Polish photographer Tomasz Gudzowaty.

== Career ==
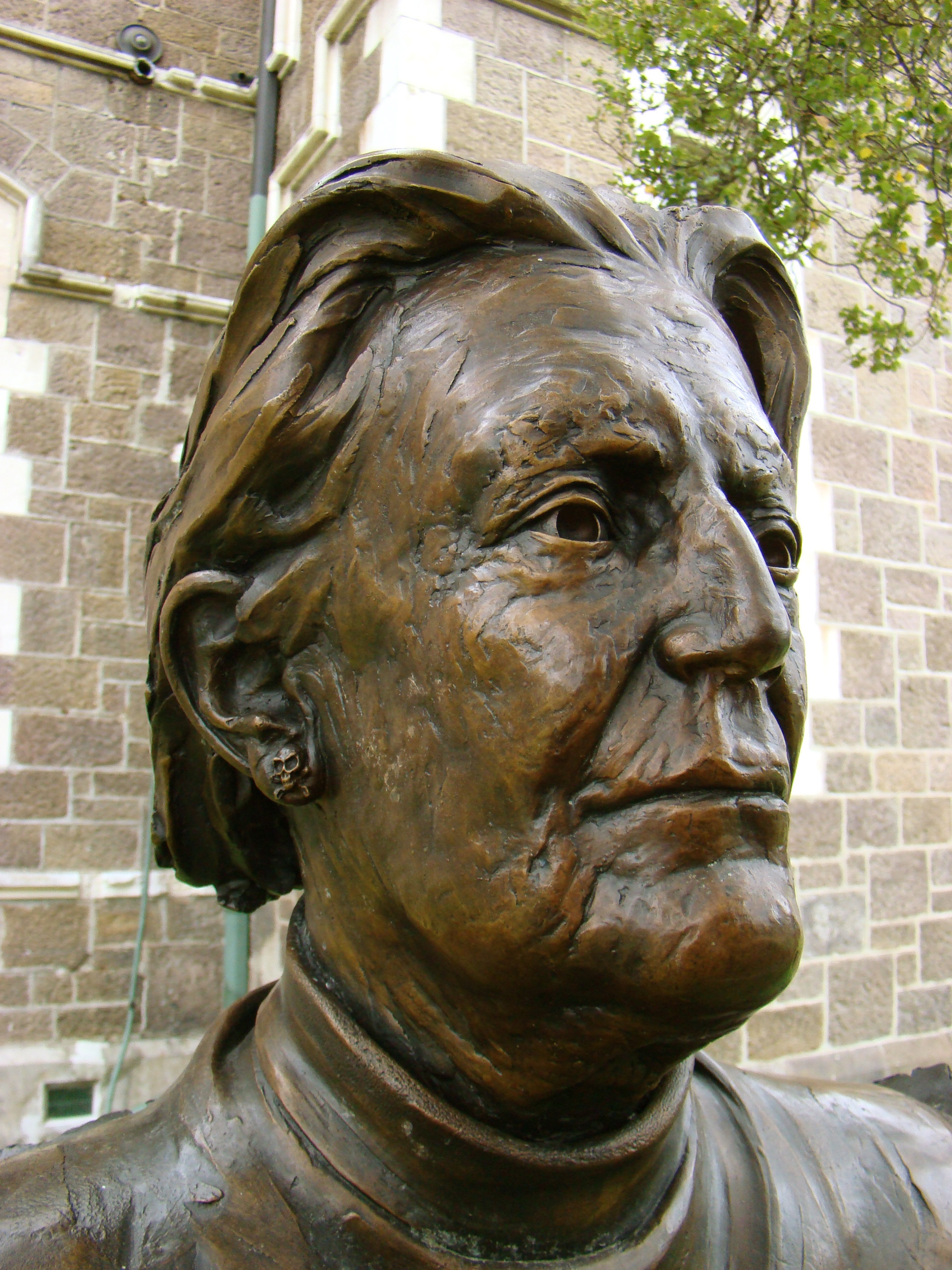
Bronze bust of Margaret Mahy, part of the Twelve Local Heroes sculpture

She worked as a librarian in Petone, the School Library Service in Christchurch, and in 1976 was appointed Children's Librarian at Canterbury Public Library. During this time many of her stories were published in the New Zealand School Journal and her first book saw her become known internationally. A Lion in the Meadow was a School Journal story from 1965. It was published in 1969 by J.M. Dent in the U.K. and Franklin Watts in the U.S., as a large-format picture book illustrated by Jenny Williams. Also in 1969, William Heinemann Ltd and Watts published another large-format picture book, The Dragon of an Ordinary Family with illustrations by Helen Oxenbury, who won the Greenaway Medal from the British librarians recognising the year's best illustrated children's book. There were three others in that same year. (Note: U.S. Library of Congress catalogue records cover ten 1969 books written by Mahy, all evidently large-format picture books (22/23cm x 28/29cm, 26pp to 42pp). They are the British and American editions of five titles with five illustrators and three British publishers, all published by Watts in the U.S.)

Mahy wrote several fantasy novels, including The Haunting and The Changeover.

Mahy became a full-time writer in 1980. She went on to win numerous book awards and honours for her contributions to New Zealand and to children's literature. One was an honorary Doctor of Letters from the University of Canterbury. In 1985 she established the Margaret Mahy Fees Scholarship at the University of Canterbury.

The Margaret Mahy Medal Award was established by the New Zealand Children's Book Foundation in 1991 to provide recognition of excellence in children's literature, publishing and literacy in New Zealand.

On 6 February 1993, Mahy was appointed a Member of the Order of New Zealand, for her contributions to children's literature. In March 2009 she was commemorated as one of the Twelve Local Heroes and a bronze bust of her was unveiled outside the Christchurch Arts Centre.

In 2010 her book Kaitangata Twitch was adapted for television and aired on Māori Television. Directed by Yvonne Mackay and produced by The Production Shed.TV, the series includes a cameo appearance by Margaret Mahy in a library scene.

== Awards ==
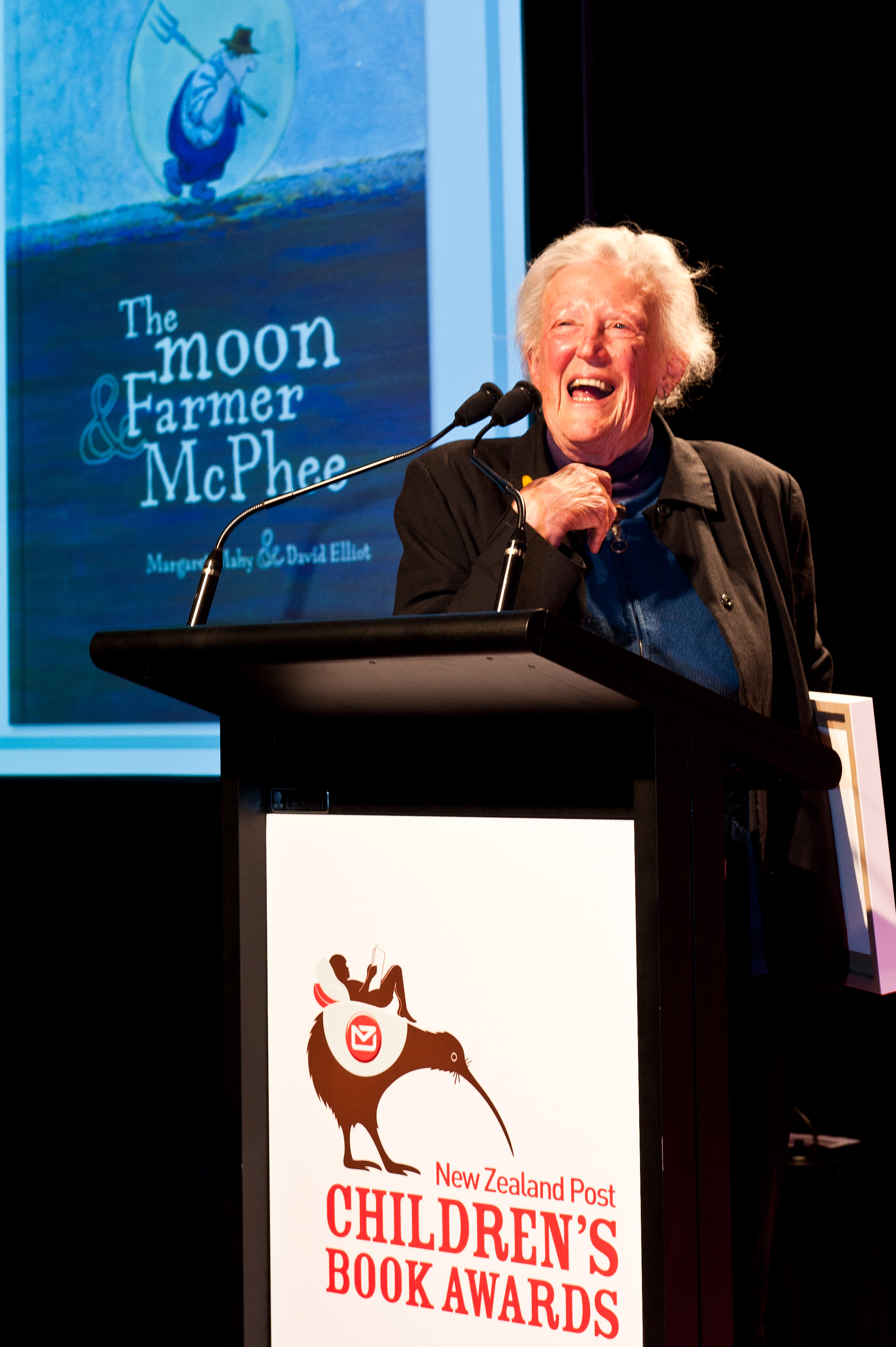
Mahy and her winning book The Moon & Farmer McPhee at the 2011 New Zealand Post Children's Book Awards

The biennial Hans Christian Andersen Award conferred by the International Board on Books for Young People is the highest recognition available to a writer or illustrator of children's books. Mahy received the writing award in 2006. Jury president Jeffrey Garrett wrote in the press release:

In awarding the 2006 Hans Christian Andersen Medal for Writing to Margaret Mahy, the jury has recognized one of the world's most original re-inventors of language. Mahy's language is rich in poetic imagery, magic, and supernatural elements. Her oeuvre provides a vast, numinous, but intensely personal metaphorical arena for the expression and experience of childhood and adolescence. Equally important, however, are her rhymes and poems for children. Mahy's works are known to children and young adults all over the world.

Mahy won the Carnegie Medal in 1982 for The Haunting. In 1984 she won the medal again for The Changeover. In 2005 she won the Phoenix Award for The Catalogue of the Universe.

The Margaret Mahy Award, named for Mahy, is presented annually to "a person who has made a significant contribution to the broad field of children's literature and literacy". Mahy was the first recipient of the award in 1991. Lectures by the winners are published, the standard of which was set by Mahy's inaugural lecture, Surprising Moments.

In 2013, the top prize for young adult fiction at the New Zealand Post Children's Book Awards was renamed the Margaret Mahy Book of the Year award. Also in 2013, a playground based on her work was commissioned to be built in Christchurch's East Frame.

Some other awards:

- Italian Premier Grafico Award, The Wind Between the Stars, 1976
- Dutch Silver Pencil Award, The Boy Who Was Followed Home, 1977
- New Zealand Post Children's Book Awards, Best Young Adult Novel, 2003, Alchemy
- Prime Minister's Awards for Literary Achievement (2005)
- Phoenix Award, 2005, The Catalogue of the Universe (1985)
- Phoenix Award runner-up (Honor Book), 2006, The Tricksters
- Sir Julius Vogel Award, 2006, for services to New Zealand science fiction and fantasy
- Phoenix Award, 2007, Memory
- New Zealand Post Children's Book Awards, Children's Book of the Year, 2011, The Moon and Farmer McPhee—picture book written by Mahy and illustrated by David Elliot

The Phoenix Award from the Children's Literature Association designates the best English-language children's book that did not win a major award when it was originally published twenty years earlier. It is named for the mythical bird phoenix, which is reborn from its ashes, to suggest the book's rise from obscurity. Mahy is one of three authors to win it twice (1985 to 2012).

== Works ==
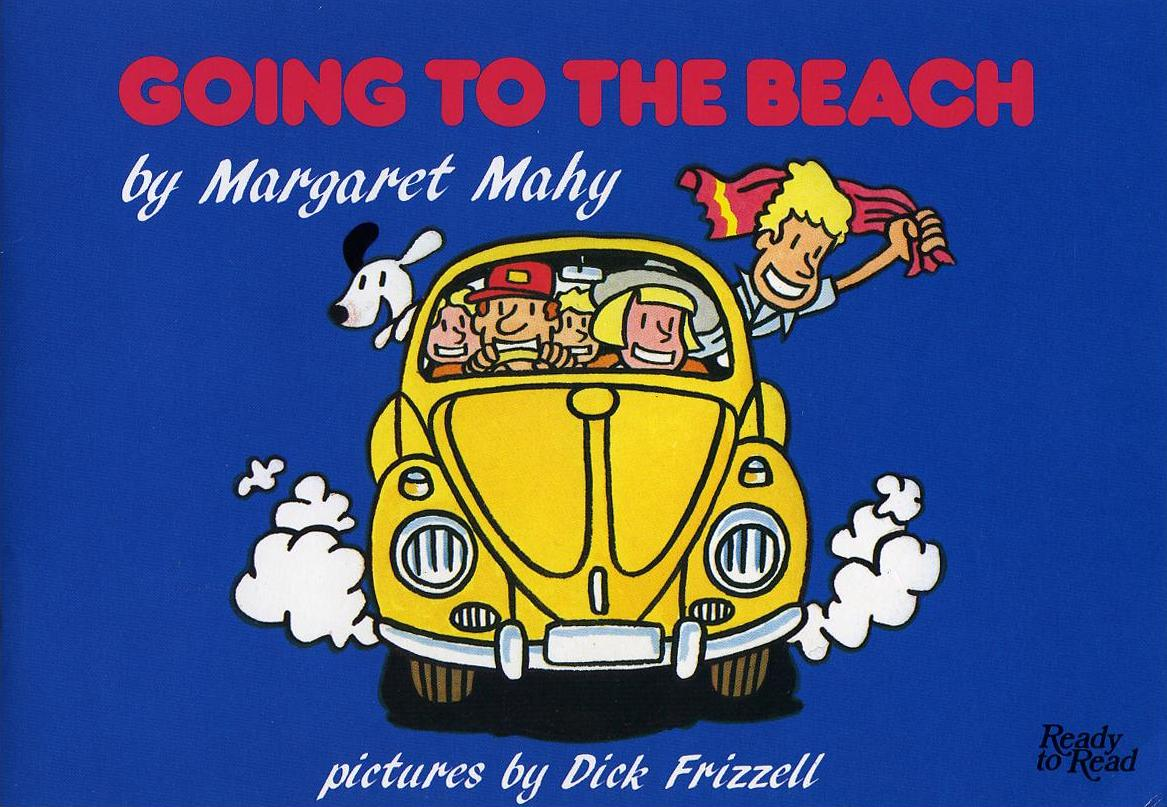
Going to the Beach, a book written by Mahy

Mahy wrote more than 100 picture books, 40 novels and 20 collections of short stories published between 1969 and 2014.
