= A Lion in the Meadow =

1969 children's book by Margaret Mahy

- Author: Margaret Mahy
- Illustrator: Jenny Williams
- Language: English
- Genre: Children's book
- Publisher: J.M. Dent & Sons; Franklin Watts
- Publication date: 1969
- Publication place: New Zealand
- Pages: 28
- ISBN: 0460057812

A Lion in the Meadow is the first children's book written by the New Zealand author Margaret Mahy. Illustrations were done by London artist Jenny Williams. The book was first published in 1969 and won the 1975 Esther Glen Award. It was also one of the books chosen to accompany Mahy's 2002 Hans Christian Andersen Award nomination. The book was reissued in 1989 with a more upbeat ending.

== Plot ==
A Lion in the Meadow follows a little boy who notices a lion living in a meadow behind his house. He attempts to warn his mother, but she dismisses his claims as "nonsense". She tells him to enter the meadow to see for himself that there is no lion, but he is afraid to.

She decides to humour him by making up a story of her own, giving him a matchbox and claiming there is a dragon inside which will chase the lion away. However, the story turns out to be true and the lion is chased into the broom cupboard, where he reveals that he can talk and lives on apples. The boy and the lion decide to play in a separate meadow where the dragon is not.

== Art ==
The art work utilises distinctive swirls, shapes and colours that emphasise the story's themes of innocence and creativity. The illustrations and choices of colour reflect the little boy's imagination and are mirrored by the mother's clothes and interior decor in the house.

== Themes ==
The theme of the story is focused on the idea of over parenting, and taking a over bearing stance on child development; one where the parent tries to limit and restrict the imagination of the child.
