= The Haunting (Mahy novel) =

1982 children's novel by Margaret Mahy

- First edition
- Author: Margaret Mahy
- Language: English
- Genre: Children's supernatural fiction, ghost story
- Publisher: J. M. Dent
- Publication date: August 1982
- Publication place: New Zealand
- Media type: Print
- Pages: 135 pp (first edition)
- ISBN: 0-460-06097-X
- OCLC: 476531256
- LC Class: PZ7.M2773 Hau

The Haunting is a low fantasy novel for children written by Margaret Mahy of New Zealand and published in 1982, including a U.K. edition by J. M. Dent. Atheneum published the first U.S. edition in 1983.

Mahy won the annual Carnegie Medal from the Library Association, recognising the year's best children's book by a British subject.

The Haunting of Barney Palmer, a New Zealand movie based on the book, was released in 1987.

== Plot introduction ==
Barney Palmer, a shy eight-year-old boy, discovers that one person in each generation of his family has had supernatural gifts – and this generation it seems to be him. He believes he is haunted by the ghost of an uncle he never met, and is oppressed by his fate. However, his sister Tabitha is determined to help him.

== Essays ==
- Symposium papers including: "Some Operations of Truth: A personal response to Margaret Mahy's The Haunting" by John McKenzie, a paper presented at a Margaret Mahy Symposium in Christchurch in 2006.
- "Feminism, Freud and the Fairytale: Reading Margaret Mahy's The Haunting" by C. Marquis, Landfall, No. 162, 1987 pp. 186–205.

Awards
Preceded by The Scarecrows	Carnegie Medal recipient 1982	Succeeded by Handles
