= The Boy Lost in the Maze =

2021 novel by Katya Balen

- First edition cover
- Author: Joseph Coelho
- Illustrator: Kate Milner
- Genre: Young adult novel, Verse novel
- Publisher: Otter-Barry Books, Candlewick Press
- Publication date: 2022
- Pages: 320
- Awards: Carnegie Medal for Writing
- ISBN: 9781913074333

The Boy Lost in the Maze is a young adult novel in verse by English poet and children's author Joseph Coelho, published by Otter-Barry Books in 2022. It won the 2024 Carnegie Medal.

== Plot summary ==
The novel is a dual coming-of-age story. It is written from two points of view: that of Theseus, the ancient Greek hero, and that of Theo, a biracial London teenager. Both are boys on a quest to find their father. While Theseus enters the Labyrinth of the Minotaur, Theo also finds himself on a confusing maze-like trail.

== Reception ==
The Boy Lost in the Maze was awarded the 2024 Carnegie Medal for Writing. It was the first time the Medal had been awarded to a Black British writer. It was also the first time the Medal had been awarded to the Children's Laureate: Coelho was Children's Laureate between 2022 and 2024.

Maura Farrelly, Chair of Judges for the Yoto Carnegies 2024, said of the novel: "It is [a] multi-layered immersive read which is playful in its language and construction and is as architectural as the mythical maze itself." Another judge described it as "embroidered with beautifully descriptive language".

Kirkus Reviews characterized the novel as "thoughtful and well-executed".

Clive Barnes, in a review for Books for Keeps, had some reservations about the stylistic choices but added, "It is, nevertheless, a daring and powerful text, supported by Kate Milner's black and white illustrations".

Awards
| Preceded by The Blue Book of Nebo | Carnegie Medal recipient 2024 | Succeeded by Glasgow Boys |
