= Carnegie Medal for Writing =

Annual award for writing a children's book published in the UK

The Carnegie Medal for Writing
- Awarded for: Outstanding new English-language book for children or young adults
- Sponsored by: Scholastic, ALCS
- Reward: £5,000
- First award: 1936; 90 years ago
- Final award: Active
- Website: carnegies.co.uk

The Carnegie Medal for Writing, established in 1936 as the Carnegie Medal, is an annual British literary award for English-language books for children or young adults. It is conferred upon the author by the Chartered Institute of Library and Information Professionals (CILIP), who in 2016 called it "the UK's oldest and most prestigious book award for children's writing".

Nominated books must be written in English and first published in the UK during the preceding school year (September to August). Until 1969, the award was limited to books by British authors first published in England. The first non-British medalist was Australian author Ivan Southall for Josh (1972). The original rules also prohibited winning authors from future consideration. The first author to win a second Carnegie Medal was Peter Dickinson in 1981, who won consecutively for Tulku and City of Gold. As of 2024, eight authors had received the Medal more than once.

The winner is awarded a gold medal and £500 worth of books donated to the winner's chosen library. In addition, since 2016 the winner has received a £5,000 cash prize from the Colin Mears bequest.

== History ==
The Medal is named after the Scottish-born American philanthropist Andrew Carnegie (1835–1919), who founded more than 2,800 libraries in the English-speaking world, including at least one in more than half of British library authorities. It was established in 1936 by the British Library Association, to celebrate the centenary of Carnegie's birth, and inaugurated in 1937 with the award to Arthur Ransome for Pigeon Post (1936) and the identification of two "commended" books. This first Medal was dated 1936, but since 2007 the award has been dated by its year of presentation, not year of publication.

In 1955, the Kate Greenaway Medal, for "distinguished illustration in a book for children", was established as a companion to the Carnegie Medal.

Both awards were established and administered by the Library Association, which was succeeded by the Chartered Institute of Library and Information Professionals (CILIP) in 2002. In 2022, the two awards were renamed to the Carnegie Medal for Writing and the Carnegie Medal for Illustration.

From 2022 to 2024, the award was sponsored by the audio technology company Yoto and was called the Yoto Carnegie Medal for Writing. As of 2025 the awards are sponsored by Scholastic and the Authors' Licensing and Collecting Society (ALCS).

Since 2019 two Shadowers' Choice Awards have been given, for writing and illustration, chosen by young people in school and library reading groups who "shadow" the judging process.

== Process ==
CILIP members may nominate books each September and October, with the full list of valid nominations published in November. The longlist, chosen by the judges from the nominated books, is published in February. The judging panel comprises 12 children's librarians, all of whom are members of CILIP's Youth Libraries Group (YLG). The shortlist is announced in March and the winner in June.

Titles must be English-language works first published in the UK during the preceding year (1 September to 31 August). According to CILIP, "all categories of books, including poetry, non-fiction and graphic novels, in print or ebook format, for children and young people are eligible". Multiple-author anthologies are excluded; however, co-authored single works are eligible.

Young people from across the UK take part in shadowing groups organised by secondary schools and public libraries, to read and discuss the shortlisted books.

CILIP instructs the judging panel to consider plot, characterisation, and style. Furthermore, it states that "the book that wins the Carnegie Medal should be a book of outstanding literary quality. The whole work should provide pleasure, not merely from the surface enjoyment of a good read, but also the deeper subconscious satisfaction of having gone through a vicarious, but at the time of reading, a real experience that is retained afterwards."

A diversity review in 2018 led to changes in the nomination and judging process to promote better representation of ethnic minority authors and books.

== Winners ==
From 1936 to 2025, 86 medals were awarded. No eligible book published in 1943, 1945, or 1966 was considered suitable by the judging panel.

From 2007 onward, the medals are dated by the year of presentation. Before this, they were dated by the calendar year of their British publication.

Forty-one winning books were illustrated in their first editions, including every one during the first three decades. Six from 1936 to 1953 were illustrated or co-illustrated by their authors; none since then.

Carnegie Medal winners
Year	Author	Title	Publisher	Ref.
1936	Arthur Ransome	Pigeon Post	Jonathan Cape	
1937 (Note: This book was named to the 70th Anniversary Top Ten in 2007.)	Eve Garnett	The Family from One End Street	Frederick Muller	
1938	Noel Streatfeild	The Circus Is Coming	J. M. Dent	
1939	Eleanor Doorly	The Radium Woman	Heinemann	
1940	Kitty Barne	Visitors from London	J. M. Dent	
1941	Mary Treadgold	We Couldn't Leave Dinah	Jonathan Cape	
1942	BB	The Little Grey Men	Eyre & Spottiswoode	
1943	(Prize withheld as no book considered suitable)			
1944	Eric Linklater	The Wind on the Moon	Macmillan	
1945	(Prize withheld as no book considered suitable)			
1946	Elizabeth Goudge	The Little White Horse	University of London	
1947	Walter de la Mare	Collected Stories for Children	Faber	
1948	Richard Armstrong	Sea Change	J. M. Dent	
1949	Agnes Allen illus. Agnes and Jack Allen (Note: The first two Medal-winning books were illustrated by their authors, as were four others to 1953 (six of the first sixteen winners), but none since then.)	The Story of Your Home		
1950	Elfrida Vipont	The Lark on the Wing	Oxford University Press	
1951	Cynthia Harnett illus. by the author	The Wool-Pack	Methuen	
1952	Mary Norton	The Borrowers	J. M. Dent	
1953	Edward Osmond illus. by the author	A Valley Grows Up	Oxford University Press	
1954	Ronald Welch (Felton Ronald Oliver)	Knight Crusader	Oxford University Press	
1955	Eleanor Farjeon	The Little Bookroom	Oxford University Press	
1956	C. S. Lewis	The Last Battle	The Bodley Head	
1957	William Mayne	A Grass Rope	Oxford University Press	
1958	Philippa Pearce	Tom's Midnight Garden	Oxford University Press	
1959	Rosemary Sutcliff	The Lantern Bearers	Oxford University Press	
1960	Ian Wolfran Cornwall illus. Marjorie Maitland Howard	The Making of Man	Phoenix House	
1961	Lucy M. Boston	A Stranger at Green Knowe	Faber	
1962	Pauline Clarke	The Twelve and the Genii	Faber	
1963	Hester Burton	Time of Trial	Oxford University Press	
1964	Sheena Porter	Nordy Bank	Oxford University Press	
1965	Philip Turner	The Grange at High Force	Oxford University Press	
1966	(Prize withheld as no book considered suitable (Note: Although no medal was awarded, one book was "Highly commended", the first time this designation was used.))			
1967	Alan Garner	The Owl Service	Collins	
1968	Rosemary Harris	The Moon in the Cloud	Faber	
1969	K. M. Peyton	The Edge of the Cloud	Oxford University Press	
1970	Leon Garfield and Edward Blishen illustrated by Charles Keeping	The God Beneath the Sea	Longman	
1971	Ivan Southall	Josh	Angus & Robertson	
1972	Richard Adams	Watership Down	Rex Collings	
1973	Penelope Lively	The Ghost of Thomas Kempe	Heinemann	
1974	Mollie Hunter	The Stronghold	Hamish Hamilton	
1975	Robert Westall	The Machine Gunners	Macmillan	
1976	Jan Mark	Thunder and Lightnings	Kestrel	
1977	Gene Kemp	The Turbulent Term of Tyke Tiler	Faber	
1978	David Rees	The Exeter Blitz	Hamish Hamilton	
1979	Peter Dickinson	Tulku	Gollancz	
1980	Peter Dickinson illus. Michael Foreman	City of Gold and other stories from the Old Testament	Gollancz	
1981	Robert Westall	The Scarecrows	Chatto & Windus	
1982	Margaret Mahy	The Haunting	J. M. Dent	
1983	Jan Mark	Handles	Kestrel	
1984	Margaret Mahy	The Changeover	J. M. Dent	
1985	Kevin Crossley-Holland illus. Alan Marks	Storm	Heinemann	
1986	Berlie Doherty	Granny Was a Buffer Girl	Methuen	
1987	Susan Price	The Ghost Drum	Faber	
1988	Geraldine McCaughrean	A Pack of Lies	Oxford University Press	
1989	Anne Fine	Goggle-Eyes	Hamish Hamilton	
1990	Gillian Cross	Wolf	Oxford University Press	
1991	Berlie Doherty	Dear Nobody	Hamish Hamilton	
1992	Anne Fine	Flour Babies	Hamish Hamilton	
1993	Robert Swindells	Stone Cold	Hamish Hamilton	
1994	Theresa Breslin	Whispers in the Graveyard	Methuen	
1995	Philip Pullman	Northern Lights	Scholastic	
1996	Melvin Burgess	Junk	Andersen Press	
1997	Tim Bowler	River Boy	Oxford University Press	
1998	David Almond illus. Adam Fisher	Skellig	Hodder & Stoughton	
1999	Aidan Chambers	Postcards from No Man's Land	The Bodley Head	
2000	Beverley Naidoo	The Other Side of Truth	Puffin	
2001	Terry Pratchett	The Amazing Maurice and his Educated Rodents	Doubleday	
2002	Sharon Creech	Ruby Holler	Bloomsbury	
2003	Jennifer Donnelly	A Gathering Light	Bloomsbury	
2004	Frank Cottrell Boyce	Millions	Macmillan	
2005	Mal Peet	Tamar	Walker Books	
2006	(The award date is the year of publication before 2006, the year of presentation after 2006.)			
2007	Meg Rosoff	Just in Case	Penguin	
2008	Philip Reeve	Here Lies Arthur	Scholastic	
2009	Siobhan Dowd	Bog Child	David Fickling	
2010	Neil Gaiman two illustrators (Note: Dave McKean illustrated the UK Adult edition and the US edition of The Graveyard Book, while Chris Riddell illustrated the UK Children's edition, all published in October 2008. Riddell was shortlisted for the companion Kate Greenaway Medal, recognising the year's best illustration.)	The Graveyard Book	Bloomsbury	
2011	Patrick Ness	Monsters of Men	Walker Books	
2012	Patrick Ness illustrated by Jim Kay	A Monster Calls	Walker Books	
2013	Sally Gardner	Maggot Moon	Hot Key Books	
2014	Kevin Brooks	The Bunker Diary	Penguin Books	
2015	Tanya Landman	Buffalo Soldier	Walker Books	
2016	Sarah Crossan	One	Bloomsbury Children's	
2017	Ruta Sepetys	Salt to the Sea	Penguin Books	
2018	Geraldine McCaughrean illustrated by Jane Milloy	Where the World Ends	Usborne Publishing	
2019	Elizabeth Acevedo	The Poet X	HarperTeen	
2020	Anthony McGowan	Lark	Barrington Stoke	
2021	Jason Reynolds	Look Both Ways	Knights Of	
2022	Katya Balen	October, October	Bloomsbury	
2023	Manon Steffan Ros	The Blue Book of Nebo	Firefly Press	
2024	Joseph Coelho	The Boy Lost in the Maze	Otter-Barry Books	
2025	Margaret McDonald	Glasgow Boys	Faber	
2026	Beth O'Brien	Wolf Siren	HarperCollins Children’s Books	

== Carnegie of Carnegies ==
To commemorate the 70th anniversary of the Carnegie Medal in 2007, CILIP created a 'Living Archive' on the Carnegie Medal website with information about each of the winning books and conducted a poll to identify the nation's favourite Carnegie Medal winner, to be named the "Carnegie of Carnegies". The winner, announced on 21 June 2007 at the British Library, was Northern Lights by Philip Pullman (1995). It was the expected winner, garnering 40% of the votes in the UK, and 36% worldwide.

70th Anniversary Top Ten

- David Almond, Skellig, (Hodder, 1998)
- Melvin Burgess, Junk, (Penguin, 1996)
- Kevin Crossley-Holland, Storm, (Egmont, 1985)
- Jennifer Donnelly, A Gathering Light, (Bloomsbury, 2003)
- Alan Garner, The Owl Service, (HarperCollins, 1967)
- Eve Garnett, The Family from One End Street, (Penguin, 1937)
- Mary Norton, The Borrowers, (Penguin, 1952)
- Philippa Pearce, Tom's Midnight Garden, (Oxford, 1958)
- Philip Pullman, Northern Lights, (Scholastic, 1995)
- Robert Westall, The Machine Gunners, (Macmillan, 1975)

Northern Lights, with 40% of the public vote, was followed by 16% for Tom's Midnight Garden by Philippa Pearce and 8% for Skellig by David Almond. As those three books had won the 70-year-old Medal in its year 60, year 23, and year 63, some commentary observed that Tom's Midnight Garden had passed a test of time that the others had not yet faced.

== Honorees ==
Before 2007, the selection process for the award was structured such that the year in which the award was given aligned with the year of publication for the books being considered. The books would be nominated and chosen during the year following their release, with the winners being announced and the medals presented in the early months of the subsequent year.

=== 1930s ===
Medal winners and commended titles, 1936-1939
Year	Author	Title	Publisher	Result	Ref.
1936	Arthur Ransome	Pigeon Post	Jonathan Cape	Winner	
1936	Howard Spring	Sampson's Circus		Commended	
1936	Noel Streatfeild	Ballet Shoes		Commended	
1937	Eve Garnett	The Family from One End Street	Frederick Muller	Winner	
1938	Noel Streatfeild	The Circus Is Coming	J. M. Dent	Winner	
1939	Eleanor Doorly	The Radium Woman	Heinemann	Winner	

=== 1940s ===
Medal winners and commended titles, 1940-1949
Year	Author	Title	Publisher	Result	Ref.
1940	Kitty Barne	Visitors from London	J. M. Dent	Winner	
1941	Mary Treadgold	We Couldn't Leave Dinah	Jonathan Cape	Winner	
1942	BB	The Little Grey Men	Eyre & Spottiswoode	Winner	
1943	Prize withheld as no book considered suitable				
1944	Eric Linklater	The Wind on the Moon	Macmillan	Winner	
1945	Prize withheld as no book considered suitable				
1946	Elizabeth Goudge	The Little White Horse	University of London	Winner	
1947	Walter de la Mare	Collected Stories for Children	Faber & Faber	Winner	
1948	Richard Armstrong	Sea Change	J. M. Dent	Winner	
1949	Agnes Allen, illus. Agnes and Jack Allen	The Story of Your Home	Faber & Faber	Winner	

=== 1950s ===
Medal winners and commended titles, 1950-1959
Year	Author	Title	Publisher	Result	Ref.
1950	Elfrida Vipont	The Lark on the Wing	Oxford University Press	Winner	
1951	Cynthia Harnett	The Wool-Pack	Methuen Publishing	Winner	
1952	Mary Norton	The Borrowers	J. M. Dent	Winner	
1953	Edward Osmond	A Valley Grows Up	Oxford University Press	Winner	
1954 (Note: The special commendation to Harold Jones in 1955 for his 1954 illustration of Lavender's Blue was "a major reason" for the Library Association to establish the Kate Greenaway Medal that year; no 1955 work was judged worthy in 1956, so the Medal was actually inaugurated one year later.)	Ronald Welch	Knight Crusader	Oxford University Press	Winner	
1954	Harold Jones and Kathleen Lines	Lavender's Blue: A Book of Nursery Rhymes		Special commendation	
1954	Lucy M. Boston	Children of Green Knowe		Commended	
1954	Nicholas Stuart Gray	Over the Hills to Fabylon		Commended	
1954	C. S. Lewis	The Horse and His Boy		Commended	
1954	Barbara Leonie Picard	The Lady of the Linden Tree		Commended	
1954	James Reeves	English Fables and Fairy Stories		Commended	
1954	Rosemary Sutcliff	The Eagle of the Ninth		Commended	
1955	Eleanor Farjeon	The Little Bookroom	Oxford University Press	Winner	
1955	Lancelot Hogben	Man Must Measure: The Wonderful World of Mathematics		Commended	
1955	Margaret Jowett	Candidate for Fame		Commended	
1955	Jo Manton	The Story of Albert Schweitzer		Commended	
1955	William Mayne	A Swarm in May		Commended	
1955	A. Philippa Pearce	Minnow on the Say		Commended	
1956	C. S. Lewis	The Last Battle	The Bodley Head	Winner	
1956	Rumer Godden	The Fairy Doll		Commended	
1956	William Mayne	Choristers' Cake		Commended	
1956	William Mayne	The Member for the Marsh		Commended	
1956	Barbara Leonie Picard	Ransom for a Knight		Commended	
1956	Ian Serraillier	The Silver Sword		Commended	
1956	Rosemary Sutcliff	The Shield Ring		Commended	
1957	William Mayne	A Grass Rope	Oxford University Press	Winner	
1957	Gillian Avery	The Warden's Niece		Commended	
1957	Anne Barrett	Sogberd's Grove		Commended	
1957	Antonia Forest	Falconer's Lure		Commended	
1957	William Mayne	The Blue Boat		Commended	
1957	Katharine Savage	The Story of the Second World War		Commended	
1957	Rosemary Sutcliff	The Silver Branch		Commended	
1958	Philippa Pearce	Tom's Midnight Garden	Oxford University Press	Winner	
1958	Lucy M. Boston	The Chimneys of Green Knowe		Commended	
1958	Rosemary Sutcliff	Warrior Scarlet		Commended	
1959	Rosemary Sutcliff	The Lantern Bearers	Oxford University Press	Winner	
1959	Cynthia Harnett	The Load of Unicorn		Commended	
1959	Mary Norton	The Borrowers Afloat		Commended	
1959	Margery Sharp	The Rescuers		Commended	
1959	John Verney	Friday's Tunnel		Commended	
1959	Andres Young	Quiet as Moss: 36 Poems		Commended	

=== 1960s ===
Medal winners and commended titles, 1960-1969
Year	Author	Title	Publisher	Result	Ref.
1960	Ian Wolfran Cornwall, illus. by Marjorie Maitland Howard	The Making of Man	Phoenix House	Winner	
1960	Hester Burton	The Great Gale		Commended	
1960	Robert Graves	The Penny Fiddle		Commended	
1960	Frederick Grice	The Bonny Pit Laddie		Commended	
1960	Mary K. Harris	Seraphina		Commended	
1960	Ian Serraillier	The Ivory Horn		Commended	
1961	Lucy M. Boston	A Stranger at Green Knowe	Faber & Faber	Winner	
1961	Antonia Forest	Peter's Room		Commended	
1961	Rumer Godden	Miss Happiness and Miss Flower		Commended	
1961	James Reeves	Ragged Robin		Commended	
1961	John Verney	February's Road		Commended	
1962	Pauline Clarke	The Twelve and the Genii	Faber & Faber	Winner	
1962	Gillian Avery	The Greatest Gresham		Commended	
1962	Hester Burton	Castors Away		Commended	
1962	Samuel E. Ellacott	Armour and Blade		Commended	
1962	Penelope Farmer	The Summer Birds		Commended	
1962	Jo Manton	The Story of John Keats		Commended	
1962	K. M. Peyton	Windfall		Commended	
1963	Hester Burton	Time of Trial	Oxford University Press	Winner	
1963	Eric Allan	The Latchkey Children		Commended	
1963	Ralph Arnold	Kings, Bishops, Knights, and Pawns: Life in a Feudal Society		Commended	
1963	Margaret J. Baker	Castaway Christmas		Commended	
1963	Antonia Forest	The Thursday Kidnapping		Commended	
1963	John Rowe Townsend	Hell's Edge		Commended	
1964	Sheena Porter	Nordy Bank	Oxford University Press	Winner	
1964	Eric S. de Mare	London's Riverside		Commended	
1964	Jenny Grace Fyson	The Three Brothers of Ur		Commended	
1964	C. Walter Hodges	Namesake		Commended	
1964	K. M. Peyton	The Maplin Bird		Commended	
1965	Philip Turner	The Grange at High Force	Oxford University Press	Winner	
1965	Alan Garner	Elidor		Commended	
1965	Jenny Grace Fyson	The Journey of the Eldest Son		Commended	
1965	Mary K. Harris	The Bus Girls		Commended	
1965	C. Headington	The Orchestra and Its Instruments		Commended	
1965	K. M. Peyton	The Plan for Birdmarsh		Commended	
1965	Barbara Leonie Picard	One is One		Commended	
1966	Prize withheld as no book considered suitable				
1966	Norman Denny and Josephine Filmer-Sankey	The Bayeux Tapestry: The Story of the Norman Conquest, 1066		Highly commended	
1966	Helen Griffith	The Wild Horse of Santander		Commended	
1966	K. M. Peyton	Thunder in the Sky		Commended	
1966	Morna Stuart	Marassa and Midnight		Commended	
1967	Alan Garner	The Owl Service	Collins	Winner	
1967	Henry Treece	The Dream Time		Highly commended	
1967	Helen Cresswell	The Piemakers		Commended	
1967	Leon Garfield	Smith		Commended	
1967	K. M. Peyton	Flambards		Commended	
1968	Rosemary Harris	The Moon in the Cloud	Faber & Faber	Winner	
1968	Joan Aiken	The Whispering Mountain		Commended	
1968	Margaret Balderson	When Jays Fly to Barbmo		Commended	
1968	Leon Garfield	Black Jack		Commended	
1969	K. M. Peyton	The Edge of the Cloud	Oxford University Press	Winner	
1969	Helen Cresswell	The Night Watchman		Commended	
1969	K. M. Peyton	Flambards in Summer		Commended	
1969	John Rowe Townsend	The Intruder		Commended	

=== 1970s ===
Medal winners and commended titles, 1970-1979
Year	Author	Title	Publisher	Result	Ref.
1970	Leon Garfield and Edward Blishen, illus. by Charles Keeping	The God Beneath the Sea	Longman	Winner	
1970	Peter Dickinson	The Devil's Children		Commended	
1970	Leon Garfield	The Drummer Boy		Commended	
1970	William Mayne	Ravensgill		Commended	
1971	Ivan Southall	Josh	Angus & Robertson	Winner	
1971	Gillian Avery	A Likely Lad		Commended	
1971	Helen Cresswell	Up the Pier		Commended	
1971	Rosemary Sutcliff	Tristan and Iseult		Commended	
1972	Richard Adams	Watership Down	Rex Collings	Winner	
1972	Peter Dickinson	The Dancing Bear		Commended	
1972	Emma Smith	No Way of Telling		Commended	
1973	Penelope Lively	The Ghost of Thomas Kempe	Heinemann	Winner	
1973	Nina Bawden	Carrie's War		Commended	
1973	Susan Cooper	The Dark Is Rising		Commended	
1973	Helen Cresswell	The Bongleweed		Commended	
1974	Mollie Hunter	The Stronghold	Hamish Hamilton	Winner	
1974	Ian Ribbons	The Battle of Gettysburg, 1–3 July 1963	Oxford University Press	Highly commended	
1974	Winifred Cawley	Gran at Coalgate		Commended	
1974	Jill Paton Walsh	The Emperor's Winding Sheet		Commended	
1975	Robert Westall	The Machine Gunners	Macmillan	Winner	
1975	Susan Cooper	The Grey King		Commended	
1975	Diana Wynne Jones	Dogsbody		Commended	
1976	Jan Mark	Thunder and Lightnings	Kestrel	Winner	
1976	Peter Dickinson	The Blue Hawk		Commended	
1977	Gene Kemp	The Turbulent Term of Tyke Tiler	Faber & Faber	Winner	
1977	Peter Carter	Under Goliath		Commended	
1977	Diana Wynne Jones	Charmed Life		Commended	
1977	Philippa Pearce	The Shadow-Cage and Other Tales of the Supernatural		Commended	
1978	David Rees	The Exeter Blitz	Hamish Hamilton	Winner	
1979	Peter Dickinson	Tulku	Gollancz	Winner	
1979	Sheila Sancha	The Castle Story		Highly commended	
1979	Bernard Ashley	A Wild Kind of Justice		Commended	
1979	Philippa Pearce	The Battle of Bubble and Squeak		Commended	
1979	Robert Westall	The Devil on the Road		Commended	

=== 1980s ===
Medal winners and commended titles, 1980-1989
Year	Author	Title	Publisher	Result	Ref.
1980	Peter Dickinson, illus. by Michael Foreman	City of Gold and other stories from the Old Testament	Gollancz	Winner	
1980	Jan Mark	Nothing To Be Afraid Of		Highly commended	
1980	John Branfield	The Fox in Winter		Commended	
1980	Jan Needle	A Sense of Shame		Commended	
1981	Robert Westall	The Scarecrows	Chatto & Windus	Winner	
1981	Jane Gardam	The Hollow Land		Highly commended	
1981	Jane Gardam	Bridget and William		Commended	
1981	Michelle Magorian	Goodnight Mister Tom		Commended	
1982	Margaret Mahy	The Haunting	J. M. Dent	Winner	
1982	Gillian Cross	The Dark Behind the Curtain		Highly commended	
1982	Tim Kennemore	Wall of Words		Commended	
1983	Jan Mark	Handles	Kestrel	Winner	
1983	James Watson	Talking in Whispers		Highly commended	
1983	Philippa Pearce	The Way to Sattin Shore		Commended	
1983	Patricia Wrightson	A Little Fear		Commended	
1984	Margaret Mahy	The Changeover	J. M. Dent	Winner	
1984	Robert Swindells	Brother in the Land	Oxford University Press	Highly commended	
1985	Kevin Crossley-Holland, illus. Alan Marks	Storm	Heinemann	Winner	
1985	Janni Howker	Nature of the Beast		Highly commended	
1986	Berlie Doherty	Granny Was a Buffer Girl	Methuen Publishing	Winner	
1986	Janni Howker	Isaac Campion		Highly commended	
1986	Bernard Ashley	Running Scared		Commended	
1986	Gillian Cross	Chartbreaker		Commended	
1986	Andrew Taylor	Coal House		Commended	
1987	Susan Price	The Ghost Drum	Faber & Faber	Winner	
1987	Margaret Mahy	Memory		Highly commended	
1987	Eileen Dunlop	The House on the Hill		Commended	
1987	Monica Furlong	Wise Child		Commended	
1987	Michael Morpurgo	King of the Cloud Forests		Commended	
1988	Geraldine McCaughrean	A Pack of Lies	Oxford University Press	Winner	
1988	Gillian Cross	A Map of Nowhere		Highly commended	
1988	Peter Dickinson	Eva	Gollancz	Highly commended	
1988	Elizabeth Laird	Red Sky in the Morning		Highly commended	
1988	Vivien Alcock	The Monster Garden		Commended	
1988	Judy Allen	Awaiting Developments		Commended	
1988	Diana Wynne Jones	The Lives of Christopher Chant		Commended	
1989	Anne Fine	Goggle-Eyes	Hamish Hamilton	Winner	
1989	Anne Fine, illus. by Philippe Dupasquier	Bill's New Frock	Egmont	Highly commended	
1989	Carole Lloyd	The Charlie Barber Treatment		Highly commended	
1989	Vivien Alcock	The Trial of Anna Cotman		Commended	

=== 1990s ===
Medal winners and commended titles, 1990-1999
Year	Author	Title	Publisher	Result	Ref.
1990	Gillian Cross	Wolf	Oxford University Press	Winner	
1990	Melvin Burgess	The Cry of the Wolf	Andersen Press	Highly commended	
1990	Robert Westall	The Kingdom by the Sea		Highly commended	
1990	Theresa Tomlinson	Riding the Waves		Commended	
1991	Berlie Doherty	Dear Nobody	Hamish Hamilton	Winner	
1991	Jacqueline Wilson, illus. by Nick Sharratt	The Story of Tracy Beaker	Doubleday	Highly commended	
1991	Annie Dalton	Real Tilly Beany		Commended	
1991	Garry Kilworth	The Drowners		Commended	
1992	Anne Fine	Flour Babies	Hamish Hamilton	Winner	
1992	Robert Westall	Gulf		Highly commended	
1992	Peter Dickinson	A Bone from a Dry Sea		Commended	
1992	Gillian Cross	The Great Elephant Chase		Commended	
1993	Robert Swindells	Stone Cold	Hamish Hamilton	Winner	
1993	Melvin Burgess	The Baby and Fly Pie		Highly commended	
1993	Jenny Nimmo	The Stone Mouse		Highly commended	
1993	Anne Merrick	Someone Came Knocking		Commended	
1994	Theresa Breslin	Whispers in the Graveyard	Methuen Young Books	Winner	
1994	Berlie Doherty	Willa And Old Miss Annie		Highly commended	
1994	Lesley Howarth	Maphead		Highly commended	
1995	Philip Pullman	Northern Lights	Scholastic Point	Winner	
1995	Jacqueline Wilson	Double Act		Highly commended	
1995	Susan Gates	Raider		Commended	
1996	Melvin Burgess	Junk	Andersen Press	Winner	
1996	Anne Fine	The Tulip Touch		Highly commended	
1996	Terry Pratchett	Johnny and the Bomb		Commended	
1997	Tim Bowler	River Boy	Oxford University Press	Winner	
1997	Henrietta Branford	Fire, Bed, and Bone		Highly commended	
1997	J. K. Rowling	Harry Potter And The Philosopher's Stone		Commended	
1998	David Almond	Skellig	Hodder Children's Books	Winner	
1999	Aidan Chambers	Postcards from No Man's Land	The Bodley Head	Winner	

=== 2000s ===
Beginning in 2003, commendations were not presented, only short and longlists; only the shortlists are presented below.

Medal honorees, 2000-2009
Year	Author	Title	Publisher	Age	Result	Ref.
2000	Beverley Naidoo	The Other Side of Truth	Puffin Books		Winner	
2000	Adèle Geras	Troy			Highly commended	
2000	Philip Pullman	The Amber Spyglass			Highly commended	
2000	Melvin Burgess	The Ghost Behind The Wall			Commended	
2001	Terry Pratchett	The Amazing Maurice and His Educated Rodents	Doubleday		Winner	
2001	Geraldine McCaughrean	Stop The Train			Highly commended	
2001	Sharon Creech	Love That Dog			Commended	
2002	Sharon Creech	Ruby Holler	HarperCollins		Winner	
2002	Anne Fine	Up On Cloud Nine			Highly commended	
2003	Jennifer Donnelly	A Gathering Light	Bloomsbury	12+	Winner	
2003	David Almond	The Fire-Eaters	Hooder	10+	Shortlist	
2003	Mark Haddon	The Curious Incident of the Dog in the Night-Time	David Fickling	12+	Shortlist	
2003	Elizabeth Laird	The Garbage King	Macmillan	10+	Shortlist	
2003	Michael Morpurgo	Private Peaceful	Collins Publishers	10+	Shortlist	
2003	Linda Newbery	Sisterland	David Fickling	13+	Shortlist	
2004	Frank Cottrell-Boyce	Millions	Macmillan	9+	Winner	
2004	Anne Cassidy	Looking for JJ	Scholastic	13+	Shortlist	
2004	Gennifer Choldenko	Al Capone Does My Shirts	Bloomsbury	11+	Shortlist	
2004	Sharon Creech	Heartbeat	Bloomsbury	10+	Shortlist	
2004	Eva Ibbotson	The Star of Kazan	Macmillan	10+	Shortlist	
2004	Philip Pullman	The Scarecrow and His Servant	Doubleday	8+	Shortlist	
2005	Mal Peet	Tamar	Walker Books	14+	Winner	
2005	David Almond	Clay	Hooder	11+	Shortlist	
2005	Frank Cottrell-Boyce	Framed	Macmillan	9+	Shortlist	
2005	Jan Mark	Turbulence	Hooder	12+	Shortlist	
2005	Geraldine McCaughrean	The White Darkness	Oxford University Press	12+	Shortlist	
2007 (Note: Prior to 2007, the award year aligned with eligible books' year of publication; in 2007 and later years, the award year followed eligible books' year of publication.)	Meg Rosoff	Just in Case	Penguin	14+	Winner	
2007	Kevin Brooks	The Road of the Dead	The Chicken House	14+	Shortlist	
2007	Siobhan Dowd	A Swift Pure Cry	David Fickling	13+	Shortlist	
2007	Anne Fine	The Road of Bones	Doubleday	12+	Shortlist	
2007	Ally Kennen	Beast	Marion Lloyd	12+	Shortlist	
2007	Marcus Sedgwick	My Swordhand is Singing	Orion	10+	Shortlist	
2008	Philip Reeve	Here Lies Arthur	Scholastic	12+	Winner	
2008	Kevin Crossley-Holland	Gatty's Tale	Orion	10+	Shortlist	
2008	Linzi Glass	Ruby Red	Penguin	12+	Shortlist	
2008	Elizabeth Laird	Crusade	Macmillan	10+	Shortlist	
2008	Tanya Landman	Apache: Girl Warrior	Walker	12+	Shortlist	
2008	Meg Rosoff	What I Was	Penguin	12+	Shortlist	
2008	Jenny Valentine	Finding Violet Park	HarperCollins	12+	Shortlist	
2009	Siobhan Dowd	Bog Child	David Fickling	12+	Winner	
2009	Kevin Brooks	Black Rabbit Summer	Puffin	14+	Shortlist	
2009	Eoin Colfer	Airman	Puffin	9+	Shortlist	
2009	Frank Cottrell-Boyce	Cosmic	Macmillan	8+	Shortlist	
2009	Keith Gray	Ostrich Boys	Definitions	12+	Shortlist	
2009	Patrick Ness	The Knife of Never Letting Go	Walker	14+	Shortlist	
2009	Kate Thompson	Creature of the Night	Bodley Head	14+	Shortlist	

=== 2010s ===
Winning and shortlisted books, 2010-2019
Year	Author	Title	Publisher	Age	Result	Ref.
2010	Neil Gaiman, illus. by Dave McKean and Chris Riddell	The Graveyard Book	Bloomsbury	9+	Winner	
2010	Laurie Halse Anderson	Chains	Bloomsbury	11+	Shortlist	
2010	Helen Grant	The Vanishing of Katharina Linden	Penguin	14+	Shortlist	
2010	Julie Hearn	Rowan the Strange	Oxford University Press	12+	Shortlist	
2010	Patrick Ness	The Ask and the Answer	Walker	14+	Shortlist	
2010	Terry Pratchett	Nation	Doubleday	11+	Shortlist	
2010	Philip Reeve	Fever Crumb	Scholastic	9+	Shortlist	
2010	Marcus Sedgwick	Revolver	Orion	12+	Shortlist	
2011	Patrick Ness	Monsters of Men	Walker	14+	Winner	
2011	Theresa Breslin	Prisoner of the Inquisition	Doubleday	12+	Shortlist	
2011	Geraldine McCaughrean	The Death-Defying Pepper Roux	Oxford University Press	10+	Shortlist	
2011	Meg Rosoff	The Bride's Farewell	Puffin	12+	Shortlist	
2011	Marcus Sedgwick	White Crow	Orion	12+	Shortlist	
2011	Jason Wallace	Out of Shadows	Andersen Press	14+	Shortlist	
2012	Patrick Ness	A Monster Calls	Walker	9+	Winner	
2012	David Almond	My Name is Mina	Hodder	9+	Shortlist	
2012	Lissa Evans	Small Change for Stuart	Doubleday	8+	Shortlist	
2012	Sonya Hartnett	The Midnight Zoo	Walker	9+	Shortlist	
2012	Ali Lewis	Everybody Jam	Andersen Press	12+	Shortlist	
2012	Andy Mulligan	Trash	David Fickling Books	12+	Shortlist	
2012	Annabel Pitcher	My Sister Lives on the Mantelpiece	Orion	10+	Shortlist	
2012	Ruta Sepetys	Between Shades of Grey	Puffin	12+	Shortlist	
2013	Sally Gardner	Maggot Moon	Hot Key Books	11+	Winner	
2013	Sarah Crossan	The Weight of Water	Bloomsbury	9+	Shortlist	
2013	Roddy Doyle	A Greyhound of a Girl	Marion Lloyd Books	9+	Shortlist	
2013	Nick Lake	In Darkness	Bloomsbury	13+	Shortlist	
2013	R. J. Palacio	Wonder	Bodley Head	10+	Shortlist	
2013	Marcus Sedgwick	Midwinterblood	Indigo	11+	Shortlist	
2013	Dave Shelton	A Boy and a Bear in a Boat	David Fickling Books	8+	Shortlist	
2013	Elizabeth Wein	Code Name Verity	Electric Monkey	13+	Shortlist	
2014	Kevin Brooks	The Bunker Diary (Note: The award to Brooks roused some controversy because of the bleak nature of the novel.)	Puffin	14+	Winner	
2014	Julie Berry	All the Truth That's in Me	Templar	14+	Shortlist	
2014	Rachel Campbell-Johnston	The Child's Elephant	David Fickling Books	11+	Shortlist	
2014	Susan Cooper	Ghost Hawk	Bodley Head	11+	Shortlist	
2014	Anne Fine	Blood Family	Doubleday	14+	Shortlist	
2014	Katherine Rundell	Rooftoppers	Faber & Faber	11+	Shortlist	
2014	Rebecca Stead	Liar & Spy	Andersen Press	9+	Shortlist	
2014	William Sutcliffe	The Wall	Bloomsbury	11+	Shortlist	
2015	Tanya Landman	Buffalo Soldier	Walker	14+	Winner	
2015	Brian Conaghan	When Mr Dog Bites	Bloomsbury	14+	Shortlist	
2015	Sarah Crossan	Apple and Rain	Bloomsbury	11+	Shortlist	
2015	Sally Gardner	Tinder	Orion	11+	Shortlist	
2015	Frances Hardinge	Cuckoo Song	Macmillan	11+	Shortlist	
2015	Elizabeth Laird	The Fastest Boy in the World	Macmillan	9+	Shortlist	
2015	Geraldine McCaughrean	The Middle of Nowhere	Usborne	11+	Shortlist	
2015	Patrick Ness	More Than This	Walker	14+	Shortlist	
2016	Sarah Crossan	One	Bloomsbury		Winner	
2016	Frances Hardinge	The Lie Tree	Macmillan		Shortlist	
2016	Nick Lake	There Will Be Lies	Bloomsbury		Shortlist	
2016	Patrick Ness	The Rest of Us Just Live Here	Walker		Shortlist	
2016	Kate Saunders	Five Children on the Western Front	Faber & Faber		Shortlist	
2016	Marcus Sedgwick	The Ghosts of Heaven	Indigo		Shortlist	
2016	Robin Talley	Lies We Tell Ourselves	HarperCollins		Shortlist	
2016	Jenny Valentine	Fire Colour One	HarperCollins		Shortlist	
2017	Ruta Sepetys	Salt to the Sea	Puffin		Winner	
2017	Frank Cottrell-Boyce	Sputnik's Guide to Life on Earth	Pan Macmillan		Shortlist	
2017	Zana Fraillon	The Bone Sparrow (Note: The Bone Sparrow received an Amnesty CILIP Honour commendation.)	Orion Children's Books		Shortlist	
2017	Bonnie-Sue Hitchcock	The Smell of Other People's Houses	Faber & Faber		Shortlist	
2017	Glenda Millard	The Stars at Oktober Bend	Old Barn Books		Shortlist	
2017	Mal Peet and Meg Rosoff	Beck	Walker		Shortlist	
2017	Philip Reeve	Railhead	Oxford University Press		Shortlist	
2017	Lauren Wolk	Wolf Hollow	Corgi		Shortlist	
2018	Geraldine McCaughrean, illus. by Jane Milloy	Where the World Ends	Usborne		Winner	
2018	Lissa Evans	Wed Wabbit	David Fickling Books		Shortlist	
2018	Will Hill	After the Fire	Usborne		Shortlist	
2018	Anthony McGowan	Rook	Barrington Stoke		Shortlist	
2018	Patrick Ness	Release	Walker		Shortlist	
2018	Marcus Sedgwick	Saint Death	Orion		Shortlist	
2018	Angie Thomas	The Hate U Give (Note: The Hate U Give received an Amnesty CILIP Honour commendation.)	Walker		Shortlist	
2018	Lauren Wolk	Beyond the Bright Sea	Corgi		Shortlist	
2019	Elizabeth Acevedo	The Poet X	Harper Teen		Winner and Shadowers' Choice Winner	
2019	Kwame Alexander, illus. by Dawud Anyabwile	Rebound	Andersen Press		Shortlist	
2019	Sophie Anderson, illus. by Elisa Paganelli	The House with Chicken Legs	Usborne		Shortlist	
2019	Candy Gourlay	Bone Talk	David Fickling Books		Shortlist	
2019	Frances Hardinge	A Skinful of Shadows	Macmillan Children's Books		Shortlist	
2019	Sally Nicholls	Things a Bright Girl Can Do	Andersen Press		Shortlist	
2019	Jason Reynolds	Long Way Down	Faber Child		Shortlist	
2019	Kate Saunders	The Land of Neverendings	Faber Child		Shortlist	

=== 2020s ===
Medal winners and Shortlists, 2020-2029
Year	Author	Title	Publisher	Result	Ref.
2020	Anthony McGowan	Lark	Barrington Stoke	Winner	
2020	Dean Atta, illus. by Anshika Khullar	The Black Flamingo	Hachette Children's Group	Shortlist and Shadowers' Choice Winner	
2020	Nick Lake	Nowhere on Earth	Hachette Children's Group	Shortlist	
2020	Randy Ribay	Patron Saints of Nothing	Little Tiger	Shortlist	
2020	Annet Schaap, trans. by Laura Watkinson	Lampie	Pushkin Children's Books	Shortlist	
2020	Marcus Sedgwick and Julian Sedgwick, illus. by Alexis Deacon	Voyages in the Underworld of Orpheus Black	Walker	Shortlist	
2020	Angie Thomas	On the Come Up	Walker	Shortlist	
2020	Chris Vick	Girl. Boy. Sea.	Head of Zeus	Shortlist	
2021	Jason Reynolds	Look Both Ways	Knights Of	Winner	
2021	Manjeet Mann	Run, Rebel	Penguin	Shortlist and Shadowers' Choice Winner	
2021	Elizabeth Acevedo	Clap When You Land	Hot Key Books	Shortlist	
2021	Sophie Anderson, illus. by Kathrin Honesta	The Girl Who Speaks Bear	Usborne	Shortlist	
2021	Joseph Coelho, illus. by Kate Milner	The Girl Who Became A Tree	Otter-Barry Books	Shortlist	
2021	Marie-Louise Fitzpatrick	On Midnight Beach	Faber & Faber	Shortlist	
2021	Ruta Sepetys	The Fountains of Silence	Penguin	Shortlist	
2021	Lauren Wolk	Echo Mountain	Penguin	Shortlist	
2022	Katya Balen, illus. by Angela Harding	October, October	Bloomsbury	Winner and Shadowers' Choice Winner	
2022	Sue Divin	Guard Your Heart	Pan Macmillan	Shortlist	
2022	Phil Earle	When the Sky Falls	Andersen Press	Shortlist	
2022	Bonnie-Sue Hitchcock	Everyone Dies Famous in a Small Town	Faber & Faber	Shortlist	
2022	Manjeet Mann	The Crossing	Penguin	Shortlist	
2022	Julian Sedgwick, illus. by Chie Kutsuwada	Tsunami Girl	Guppy Publishing	Shortlist	
2022	Alex Wheatle	Cane Warriors	Andersen Press	Shortlist	
2022	Ibi Zoboi and Yusef Salaam	Punching the Air	HarperCollins	Shortlist	
2023	Manon Steffan Ros	The Blue Book of Nebo	Firefly Press	Winner	
2023	Ruta Sepetys	I Must Betray You	Hodder Children's Books	Shortlist and Shadowers' Choice Winner	
2023	Katya Balen	The Light in Everything	Bloomsbury Children’s Books	Shortlist	
2023	Sita Brahmachari	When Shadows Fall	Little Tiger	Shortlist	
2023	Jessie Burton	Medusa	Bloomsbury Children’s Books	Shortlist	
2023	Louise Finch	The Eternal Return of Clara Hart	Little Island	Shortlist	
2023	Patrice Lawrence	Needle	Barrington Stoke	Shortlist	
2024	Joseph Coelho, illus. by Kate Milner	The Boy Lost in the Maze	Otter-Barry Books	Winner	
2024	Tia Fisher	Crossing the Line	Bonnier	Shortlist and Shadowers' Choice Winner	
2024	Kwame Alexander	The Door of No Return	Andersen	Shortlist	
2024	Zillah Bethell	The Song Walker	Usborne	Shortlist	
2024	Sophie Cameron	Away with Words	Little Tiger	Shortlist	
2024	Nicola Davies, illus. by Petr Horáček	Choose Love	Graffeg	Shortlist	
2024	Hiba Noor Khan	Safiyyah's War	Andersen	Shortlist	
2024	Nathanael Lessore	Steady for This	Bonnier	Shortlist	
2025	Margaret McDonald	Glasgow Boys	Faber Children's	Winner	
2025	Nathanael Lessore	King of Nothing	Bonnier	Shortlist and Shadowers' Choice Winner	
2025	Brian Conaghan	Treacle Town	Andersen Press	Shortlist	
2025	Claire Furniss	The Things We Leave Behind	Simon & Schuster	Shortlist	
2025	Matt Goodfellow, illus. by Joe Todd-Stanton	The Final Year	Otter-Barry Books	Shortlist	
2025	Kelly McCaughrain	Little Bang	Walker	Shortlist	
2025	Blessing Musariri	All That It Ever Meant	Zephyr	Shortlist	
2025	Luke Palmer	Play	Firefly Press	Shortlist	
2026	Beth O'Brien	Wolf Siren	Faber Children's	Winner and Shadowers' Choice Winner	
2026	Katya Balen	Ghostlines	Bloomsbury Children's	Shortlist	
2026	Tia Fisher	Not Going to Plan	Hotkey	Shortlist	
2026	Rob Harrell	Popcorn	Picadilly	Shortlist	
2026	William Hussey	The Boy I Love	Andersen Press	Shortlist	
2026	Patrick Ness, illus. by Tim Miller	Chronicles of a Lizard Nobody	Walker	Shortlist	
2026	Jason Reynolds	Twenty-Four Seconds from Now	Faber	Shortlist	
2026	J. P. Rose	Birdie	Andersen Press	Shortlist	

== Repeat honorees ==
Eight authors have won two Carnegie Medals, which was prohibited for many years. Additionally, several authors have been shortlisted and/or commended multiple times.

The table below provides a list of authors who have been honoured, sorted first by number of honors and the rank of the honor (e.g., win is higher than commendation), then by the authors' last name. For the sake of ease, shortlists are considered of equal rank to commendations, though lower than high commendations. The table was last updated in September 2026.

Repeat honorees
Author	Wins	High commendations	Commendations	Shortlists
Anne Fine	2 (1989, 1992)	3 (1989, 1996, 2002)		2 (2007, 2014)
Robert Westall	2 (1975, 1981)	2 (1990, 1992)		1 (2007) (Note: Westfall's The Machine Gunners was shortlisted for the 2007 Carnegie of Carnegie's award.)
Peter Dickinson	2 (1979, 1980)	1 (1988)	4 (1970, 1972, 1976, 1992)	
Geraldine McCaughrean	2 (1988, 2018)	1 (2001)		3 (2005, 2011, 2015)
Jan Mark	2 (1976, 1983)	1 (1980)		1 (2005)
Berlie Doherty	2 (1986, 1991)	1 (1994)		
Margaret Mahy	2 (1982, 1984)	1 (1987)		
Patrick Ness	2 (2011, 2012)			5 (2009, 2010, 2015, 2016, 2018, 2026)
K. M. Peyton	1 (1969)	6 (1962, 1964, 1965, 1966, 1967, 1969)		
William Mayne	1 (1957)	5 (1955, 1956, 1957, 1970) (Note: Two of Mayne's books were highly commended in 1956.)		
Rosemary Sutcliff	1 (1959)	5 (1954, 1956, 1957, 1958, 1971)		
Gillian Cross	1 (1990)	4 (1982, 1986, 1988, 1992)		
Melvin Burgess	1 (1996)	3 (1990, 1993, 2000)		2 (1996, 2007) (Note: Burgess's Junk was shortlisted for the 2007 Carnegie of Carnegies.)
Philippa Pearce	1 (1958)	3 (1977, 1979, 1983)		1 (2007) (Note: Pearce's Tom's Midnight Garden was selected for the 2007 Carnegie of Carnegie Top 10.)
Leon Garfield	1 (1970)	3 (1967, 1968, 1970)		
Lucy M. Boston	1 (1961)	2 (1954, 1958)		
Hester Burton	1 (1963)	2 (1960, 1962)		
Philip Pullman	1 (1995)	1 (2000)		2 (2004, 2007) (Note: Pullman's Northern Lights was selected for the 2007 Carnegie of Carnegie's Top 10.)
Sharon Creech	1 (2002)	1 (2001)		1 (2004)
Alan Garner	1 (1967)	1 (1965)		1 (2007) (Note: Westfall's The Machine Gunners was selected for the 2007 Carnegie of Carnegie's award.)
Mary Norton	1 (1952)	1 (1959)		1 (2007) (Note: Norton's The Borrowers was selected for the 2007 Carnegie of Carnegie's Top 10.)
Terry Pratchett	1 (2008)	1 (1996)		1 (2010)
Cynthia Harnett	1 (1951)	1 (1959)		
C. S. Lewis	1 (1956)	1 (1954)		
Noel Streatfeild	1 (1938)	1 (1936)		
Robert Swindells	1 (1993)	1 (1984)		
David Almond	1 (1998)			4 (2003, 2005, 2007, 2012) (Note: Almond's Skellig was shortlisted for the 2007 Carnegie of Carnegie's award.)
Frank Cottrell-Boyce	1 (2004)			3 (2005, 2009, 2017)
Ruta Sepetys	1 (2017)			3 (2012, 2021, 2023)
Kevin Brooks	1 (2014)			2 (2007, 2009)
Sarah Crossan	1 (2016)			2 (2013, 2015)
Kevin Crossley-Holland	1 (1985)			2 (1985, 2008) (Note: Crossley-Holland's Storm was shortlisted for the 2007 Carnegie of Carnegie award.)
Philip Reeve	1 (2008)			2 (2010, 2017)
Meg Rosoff	1 (2007)			2 (2008, 2011)
Katya Balen	1 (2022)			2 (2023, 2026)
Theresa Breslin	1 (1994)			1 (2011)
Siobhan Dowd	1 (2009)			1 (2007)
Sally Gardner	1 (2013)			1 (2015)
Tanya Landman	1 (2015)			1 (2008)
Anthony McGowan	1 (2020)			1 (2018)
Mal Peet	1 (2005)			1 (2017)
Jason Reynolds	1 (2021)			12 (2019, 2026)
Helen Cresswell		4 (1969, 1971, 1973, 1967)		
Gillian Avery		3 (1957, 1962, 1971)		
Antonia Forest		3 (1957, 1961, 1963)		
Diana Wynne Jones		3 (1975, 1977, 1988)		
Barbara Leonie Picard		3 (1954, 1956, 1965)		
Susan Cooper		2 (1973, 1975)		1 (2014)
Vivien Alcock		2 (1988, 1989)		
Bernard Ashley		2 (1979, 1986)		
Jenny Grace Fyson		2 (1964, 1965)		
Rumer Godden		2 (1956, 1961)		
Mary K. Harris		2 (1960, 1965)		
Janni Howker		2 (1985, 1986)		
Jo Manton		2 (1955, 1962)		
James Reeves		2 (1954, 1961)		
Ian Serraillier		2 (1956, 1960)		
John Rowe Townsend		2 (1963, 1969)		
John Verney		2 (1959, 1961)		
Jacqueline Wilson		2 (1991, 1995)		
Elizabeth Laird		1 (1988)		3 (2003, 2008, 2015)
Jane Gardam		1 (1981)	1 (1981)	
Michael Morpurgo		1 (1987)		1 (2003)
Marcus Sedgwick				7 (2007, 2010, 2011, 2013, 2016, 2018, 2020)
Frances Hardinge				3 (2015, 2016, 2019)
Nick Lake				3 (2013, 2016, 2020)
Lauren Wolk				3 (2017, 2018, 2021)
Elizabeth Acevedo				2 (2019, 2021)
Sophie Anderson				2 (2019, 2021)
Lissa Evans				2 (2012, 2018)
Bonnie-Sue Hitchcock				2 (2017, 2022)
Manjeet Mann				2 (2021, 2022)
Kate Saunders				2 (2016, 2019)
Angie Thomas				2 (2018, 2020)
Jenny Valentine				2 (2008, 2016)
Joseph Coelho	1 (2024)			1 (2021)
Nathanael Lessore				2 (2024, 2025)

== Multiple award recipients ==
Six books have won both the Carnegie Medal and the annual Guardian Children's Fiction Prize, which was inaugurated 1967.(Dates are years of UK publication, and Carnegie award dates before 2006.)

- Alan Garner, The Owl Service (1967)
- Richard Adams, Watership Down (1972)
- Geraldine McCaughrean, A Pack of Lies (1988)
- Anne Fine, Goggle-Eyes (1989)
- Philip Pullman, His Dark Materials 1: Northern Lights (1995)
- Melvin Burgess, Junk (1996)

Only A Monster Calls, written by Patrick Ness and illustrated by Jim Kay, has won both the Carnegie and Greenaway Medals (2012).

Only The Graveyard Book by Neil Gaiman (2009) has won both the Carnegie Medal and the equivalent American award, the Newbery Medal.

Sharon Creech, who won the Carnegie for Ruby Holler (2002), previously won the Newbery and two UK awards for Walk Two Moons (1994).

Four writers have won both the Carnegie and the US Michael L. Printz Award. The Printz Award is an American Library Association literary award that annually recognises the "best book written for teens, based entirely on its literary merit". The four writers are David Almond, Aidan Chambers, Geraldine McCaughrean, and Meg Rosoff. Chambers alone has won both for the same book, the 1999 Carnegie and 2003 Printz for the novel Postcards from No Man's Land.

In its scope, books for children or young adults, the British Carnegie corresponds to the American Newbery and Printz awards.

== See also ==
- Carnegie Medal for Illustration
- Children's Laureate
- Blue Peter Book Awards
- Guardian Children's Fiction Prize
- Nestlé Smarties Book Prize
- Newbery Medal, the primary American Library Association annual children's book award
- Michael L. Printz Award, the primary ALA annual young adult book award
