= Barbara Leonie Picard =

British children's writer

- Born: 17 December 1917; Richmond-upon-Thames, London, England
- Died: 15 December 2011 (aged 93)
- Occupation: Writer
- Writing career
- Genres: Children's historical fiction, myth and legend, fairy tale

Barbara Leonie Picard (17 December 1917 – 15 December 2011) was a British writer of children's books, best known for historical fiction and for retellings of ancient myths and medieval legends. Her works were meticulously researched. She also wrote original fairy tales. Three of her books were commended runners up for the annual British Carnegie Medal, one collection of her fairy tales and two historical novels. (Note: Today there are usually eight books on the Carnegie shortlist. According to CCSU, there were about 160 commendations of two kinds in 49 years from 1954 to 2002, including six each for 1954, 1956, and 1965.)

== Biography ==
Picard was born in Richmond-upon-Thames, a borough of London, and lived for some time in a rented cottage outside Seaford, East Sussex, with her mother. Her mother was raised in Venezuela, moved to Britain, and married a French soldier who had been sent to London as a consul. The marriage faltered early and Picard saw her father only fleetingly as a child. Although Picard was raised by her mother, her father supported the family and wrote to her all his life.

When I was a small child, polite people said of me that I was shy; I never was, I was merely unsociable. When I was grown up, they called me reserved; I was, but only because I was unsociable. Now that I am old, they speak of me as a recluse: and I am a recluse–because I am still unsociable.

— Barbara Leonie Picard, Something about the Author Autobiography Series, V. 10, p. 229-30

Educated by a governess until the age of nine, Picard was not acquainted with children until she went to prep school. She had three happy years until she was placed in a boarding school in Berkshire where she made no friends. As an old woman, she explained that she had been and remained always "unsociable" (see box). Although she earned high academic honours, she left school at age 16, deciding to write rather than enter university. She trained as a librarian in Eastbourne and during that time also taught herself Greek. During the Second World War she was a volunteer fire-watcher, spending her time at night on top of the library roof writing literary fairy tales for her own amusement. Readings were broadcast on British Radio Children's Hour in 1947 and fifty original fairy tales were eventually published, primarily by Oxford University Press beginning in 1949.

Early in the 1950s Picard moved from her mother's home to nearby Lewes. She continued working during the day and writing in the evening. After publishing a second collection of her stories, Oxford suggested that she try retelling ancient Greek mythology for children. Picard did so, beginning with The Odyssey of Homer in 1952; later she heard that it was appreciated by the famous interpreter of Greek myths, Robert Graves. She followed that with Tales of the Norse Gods and Heroes (1953), Stories of King Arthur and his Knights (1955), and French Legends, Tales, and Fairy Stories (1955). Picard refrained from writing in a poetic style and her prose stayed faithful to the ferocity of the original works. A decade later, she retold material from south and west Asia. One retrospective account cited her retellings generally for the "resonant, almost ceremonial language she uses to convey both story and feeling. Her narratives have the ring of tales told by skald and bard, and her choice of words would fill great halls."

Meanwhile, the third and last Oxford volume of her original stories was published in 1954, The Lady of the Linden Tree. For that work she was one of six commended runners up for the 1954 Carnegie Medal, a distinction the Library Association introduced that year.

Picard's first novel, Ransom for a Knight (1956), was historical fiction set in the 14th century. It features a 10-year-old girl, a knight's daughter, who hears of her father's death in Scotland and leaves her Sussex home to find the truth behind his disappearance. Illustrated by C. Walter Hodges, Ransom for a Knight was popular with girl readers who related to the spirited female heroine of the story. It earned her second Carnegie commendation but narrowly missed winning. The story of a missing or distant parent would be a recurring theme for Picard, mirroring her own childhood.

In 1965, seven more of her 1940s fairy tales were published by Harrap as The Goldfinch Garden. The last two saw the light in 1968. That same year, another historical novel set in the 14th century, One is One (1965) earned her third Carnegie commendation.

Encyclopædia Britannica names Picard one of ten foremost members of a "new English school" of children's historical fiction, "stressing conscientious scholarship, realism, honesty, social awareness, and general disdain for mere swash and buckle, [which] produced work that completely eclipsed the rusty tradition of Marryat and George Alfred Henty."

Late in her career Picard become increasingly solitary—a recluse, she admitted (see box). Her work came to be neglected and she was forced to raise £5,000 to see her final novel, The Deceivers, published in 1996.

== Books ==
- The Mermaid and the Simpleton (Oxford, 1949), illustrated by Philip Gough —15 original fairy tales ‡
- The Faun and the Woodcutter's Daughter (Oxford, 1951), illus. Charles Stewart —14 original fairy tales ‡
- The Odyssey of Homer (1952), illus. Joan Kiddell-Monroe
- Tales of the Norse Gods and Heroes (1953), illus. Joan Kiddell-Monroe
- The Lady of the Linden Tree (Oxford, 1954), illus. Charles Stewart —12 original fairy tales ‡
- Stories of King Arthur and his Knights (1955), illus. Roy Morgan
- French Legends, Tales, and Fairy Stories (1955), illus. Joan Kiddell-Monroe
- Ransom for a Knight (1956), illus. C. Walter Hodges
- German Hero-Sagas and Folk-Tales (1958), illus. Joan Kiddell-Monroe
- The Iliad of Homer (1960), illus. Joan Kiddell-Monroe
- Tales of the British People (1961), illus. Eric Fraser
- The Tower and the Traitors (1961), illus. William Stobbs
- Lost John: A Young Outlaw in the Forest of Arden (1962), illus. Charles Keeping
- Hero-tales from the British Isles (1963), illus. John G. Galsworthy
- One is One (1965), illus. Victor Ambrus
- The Goldfinch Garden: Seven Tales (Harrap & Co, 1965), illus. Anne Linton —7 original fairy tales ‡
- Celtic tales: Legends of tall warriors & old enchantments (1965), illus. John G. Galsworthy
- The Young Pretenders (1966), illus. Victor Ambrus
- Twice Seven Tales (Kaye & Ward Ltd, 1968), illus. Victor Ambrus —The Lady of the Linden Tree plus two more original fairy tales ‡
- The Story of the Pandavas, retold from the Mahøabhøarata (1968), illus. Charles Stewart
- Tales of Ancient Persia, retold from the Shah-Nama of Firdausi (1972), illus. Victor Ambrus
- Three ancient Kings: Gilgamesh, Hrolf Kraki, Conary (1972), illus. Philip Gough
- Selected Fairy Tales (1994), illus. Julia Cobbold —16 of the 50 previously published original fairy tales ‡
- The Deceivers (1997)
- The Midsummer Bride (Oxford, 1999), illus. Alan Marks, a picture book edition of one story from Selected Fairy Tales ‡

‡ Fifty original fairy tales that Picard wrote in the 1940s were published in five volumes with four illustrators and three publishers, 1949 to 1968. Years later Oxford published Selected Fairy Tales, her 16 favourites of the 41 that had appeared in the three early Oxford volumes.
