= Storm (novella) =

1985 children's book by Kevin Crossley-Holland

- Cover of new edition (Heinemann, 2001)
- Author: Kevin Crossley-Holland
- Illustrator: Alan Marks
- Cover artist: Marks
- Language: English
- Genre: Children's supernatural fiction, ghost story
- Publisher: Heinemann
- Publication date: 7 August 1985
- Publication place: United Kingdom
- Media type: Print (hardcover)
- Pages: 42 pp (first edition)
- ISBN: 0-435-00101-9
- OCLC: 12637640
- LC Class: PZ7.C88284 St 1989

Storm is a novella and picture book written by Kevin Crossley-Holland, illustrated by Alan Marks, and published by Heinemann in 1985. It was the first children's book for Marks. The story features modern cottagers near a marshland with a renowned ghost. The younger daughter must cross the marsh alone in a family emergency, with telephone service down during a storm,.

Crossley-Holland won the annual Carnegie Medal from the Library Association, recognising the year's outstanding children's book by a British author. For the 70th anniversary of the Medal in 2007, Storm was named one of the top ten winning works, selected by a panel to compose the ballot for a public election of the nation's favourite.

Barron's published a first US and Canadian edition in 1989, retaining the Marks illustrations.

== Summaries ==
"On a wild, stormy night, Annie is offered a ride by a tall, silent horseman. She overcomes her fear of the ghost who is said to haunt the lonely road and accepts the ride—but who is this mysterious stranger?" --library catalogue summary

"Annie knows the secrets of the great marsh. She's even heard about its ghost. On a terrible night, when Annie must brave the storm alone, not even she knows what to expect." --CILIP summary

== Audience ==
In a capsule summary for the 70-year Carnegie celebration (2007), the British librarians recommend Storm for ages six and up. That is an audience two years younger than any others of the anniversary top ten; the recommendations range from ages 6+ to 14+.

Storm is a chapter book, a picture book whose text is considered primary. One recent publisher Egmont (2001) calls its so-called Bananas books "designed for independent reading" by early readers. The more advanced such as Storm are recommended for children making the transition from Key Stage 1 (the first two years of British primary education) to Key Stage 2.

During the 1970s and early 1980s there had been some discussion of the readership served by the Carnegie Medal; some children's librarians had expressed concern that it recognised books for teenage readers almost exclusively. Thus the award to Storm was seen as a move to redress the imbalance. Indeed, published in Heinemann's "Banana Book" line, Storm may be considered the first book for early readers to win the Carnegie Medal.

== Significance ==
Despite the young audience, Storm is not a simple story. The language is deceptively simple: no difficult words are used but the effect is poetic and moving, and the ideas conveyed are anything but simple. Is it a ghost story? Is it a folk legend? Crossley-Holland is a folklore scholar and brings elements of the folk tale, and of the legends of the East Anglian country where he lived at the time, into this 42-page story of Annie and her adventure on a wild stormy night.

== See also ==
Awards
Preceded by The Changeover	Carnegie Medal recipient 1985	Succeeded by Granny Was a Buffer Girl
