= Edward Pyddoke =

Edward Whately Pyddoke (1909 – 8 September 1976) was a British archaeologist, antiquarian, and author on archaeological and related subjects, who served as Secretary and Registrar for the University of London Institute of Archaeology.

== Early life and education ==
Pyddoke was the elder son of Henry Whately Pyddoke, of Bonnyrigg, Tonbridge, Kent, formerly of Oxhill, Loughton, Essex, and Edith, daughter of Major John Wilson, of the Scots Greys. He had an elder sister, Silvia (1908–1961), who served as consultant anaesthetist to the hospitals in Maidstone, and a younger brother, John (1917-2000). Henry Pyddoke was involved in the social reform activities undertaken by Toynbee Hall, founded by Samuel Barnett, at whose request he undertook an investigation in the winter of 1894 into the casual ward system, involving over six hundred interviews. The Pyddoke family were minor gentry, originally gunmakers named Whately (also Whateley) who through a marriage in the 1700s inherited the estate of the Piddock family (including The Austins, at Handsworth, Staffordshire) and adopted that family's name.

He was educated at Tonbridge School in Kent, then at the University of London Institute of Archaeology in their first cohort of students for the Postgraduate Diploma of Prehistoric Archaeology, in 1946/ 7; amongst the five other students were Grace Simpson and Nancy Sandars. Based at St John's Lodge, Regent's Park, London, and started by Sir Mortimer Wheeler, they were taught by eminent archaeologists including V. Gordon Childe, Kathleen Kenyon, F. E. Zeuner, and Stuart Piggott. He took the examinations in 1948, and was awarded the Diploma. Whilst a student, Pyddoke was appointed a part-time assistant in the Department of European Archaeology, responsible for "arranging and cataloguing the relevant section of the collection".

== Career ==
Pyddoke was a motoring enthusiast, building cars raced at Brooklands with the Bolster brothers, with whom he had been at school; after leaving Tonbridge, he went to work at SU Carburettors in Birmingham. He subsequently worked for the Anglo-American Oil Company in 1939 and for the Bank of England Exchange Control prior to his archaeological studies; from 1948 to 1951, he was curator at the Barbican House museum at Lewes, Sussex, before in 1951 taking over from Dr Ian Cornwall as Secretary and Registrar at the University of London Institute of Archaeology, serving in this capacity until 1955.

Pyddoke wrote and co-wrote several works, including Stratification for the Archaeologist (1961), a "systematic treatment of soils" in which he "emphasized the geologic and geographic context of archaeological sites and... the importance of understanding natural formation processes to interpreting the archaeological record", and What is Archaeology? (1965). He also collaborated with his Institute of Archaeology colleagues Henry W. M. Hodges (lecturer in Archaeological Technology) and Marjorie Maitland Howard, who provided illustrations, on Ancient Britons: How they lived (1969), which "recreate[d] life in the British Isles from the Old Stone Age to the Roman invasions". He was editor, in 1963, of The Scientist and Archaeology, with contributions from Richard J. C. Atkinson, Kenneth Oakley, Edward Thomas Hall, Henry Hodges, and others, a "useful compact book" highlighting how "the biological and physical sciences can enlighten [archaeologists'] interpretations from artifacts and excavation data".

Pyddoke was a Fellow of the Society of Antiquaries of London; he challenged "with some authority, and with the use of some scientific terminology" the theory that William Shakespeare was buried close to the bank of the River Avon.

== Personal life ==
In 1936, Pyddoke married Ruth Alfreda Worsell Martin; they had one daughter. They lived at Northumberland Mansions, Luxborough Street, City of Westminster. He died on 8 September 1976.
