= Glasgow Boys =

Glasgow Boys may refer to:

- The Glasgow Boys, a group of artists, part of the Glasgow School
- Glasgow Boys (novel), a 2024 young adult novel by Margaret McDonald
