= Agnes Allen =

Agnes Allen may refer to:

- Agnes Allen (baseball)
- Agnes Allen (author)
