= Sea Change (Armstrong novel) =

1948 children's adventure novel by Richard Armstrong

- Cover of first edition
- Author: Richard Armstrong
- Illustrator: Michel Leszczynski
- Language: English
- Genre: Children's realistic novel, sea story
- Publisher: J. M. Dent
- Publication date: 1948
- Publication place: United Kingdom
- Media type: Print (hardcover, paperback)
- Pages: 222 pp (first edition)
- OCLC: 1116022

Sea Change is a realistic children's adventure novel by Richard Armstrong, first published by Dent in 1948 with line drawings by Michel Leszczynski and promoted as "A novel for boys". Set on a contemporary cargo ship, it features a sixteen-year-old apprentice in the British Merchant Navy who has completed one year at sea, of four years required. He is working towards his second mate's ticket, but has mixed feelings about the life.

Armstrong had served 17 years in the Merchant Service, in "tramps, steamers, liners, colliers and tankers" after World War I, beginning at the same age. He and Sea Change won the annual Carnegie Medal from the Library Association, recognising the year's best children's book by a British subject.

== Plot summary ==
Cam Renton has been an apprentice seaman for a year when he arrives at Liverpool to join the crew of the Langdale, a cargo ship heading for Barbados and the Spanish Main. He is working towards becoming an officer and someday captain of his own ship. Because he is dissatisfied with the progress of his training, he asks the Chief Mate for assignment to one of the night watches rather than to routine day-work. The mate gives him short shrift, and during the outward voyage the two are at odds.

Rankling under a sense of injustice, Cam devises a scheme to make the mate think he is haunted by a whistling poltergeist. However, he soon realises this is childish and futile.

When they reach the Caribbean, Cam takes a rare opportunity to go ashore at Boca del Sol, a fictional seaport. He and his bunkmate Rusty find themselves in the local prison after a misunderstanding. Cam executes a daring escape, but Captain Carey already has the matter well in hand, and he tells Cam a few home truths showing him that he is getting an excellent training in seamanship, thanks to the mate.

Afterward Cam starts to work and study in earnest, and his knowledge of navigation and semaphore are put to use when he becomes part of a skeleton crew aboard a salvaged derelict.

== Characters ==
- Campbell "Cam" Renton, a sixteen-year-old apprentice seaman
- "Rusty" Roberts, his fellow apprentice and bunkmate
- Captain Carey, captain of the Langdale, a cargo ship with a complement of thirty-eight crew members
- Andy, chief mate of the Langdale
- "Happy" Hartland, the cheerful Cornish second mate
- The third mate
- The bosun
- "Chippy" Rasmussan, a gentle Scandinavian giant, the ship's carpenter
- The ship's cook, a talented banjo player
- "Calamity" Calston, an able seaman with a penchant for predicting disaster at every turn
- "Bandy" Boscombe, an able seaman
- "Taffy", a Welsh sailor
- The commandant of the fort and its soldiers at Boca del Sol

== Themes and literary significance ==
Sea Change was the first book specifically for boys to win the Carnegie Medal. All the characters are male and the story is set almost entirely in the traditionally masculine environment of a ship at sea. Further, Cam's family is not mentioned, nor do any of the characters refer to life ashore. The focus is firmly on the work of the ship and the interactions between crew members.

Michele Gill places Sea Change in a Late Victorian tradition of didactic adventure books inculcating manly values (Victorian masculinity). She notes the emphasis on the trustworthy adults who guide the boy's training. "The novel suggests the continuance of a set of attributes which define manliness as well as maintaining the status quo within a society recovering from the upheaval of a World War."

From another perspective, Marcus Crouch sees the book as breaking drastically with the tradition of sea stories through its uncompromising realism. "In its unobtrusive way this was a revolutionary book ... It substituted for romance a robust facing of reality." He identifies Armstrong's intention to give the reader a sense of his own power, a confidence in his ability to live a full life in the real world, to provide in effect an "admirable textbook for life". What makes the book a true novel, though, is Armstrong's exposition and analysis of character. As well as having a command of the details of shipboard life, Armstrong has a profound understanding of how a young man thinks, and skilfully shows Cam's essential decency and his struggle to come to terms with the world he finds himself in.

== Realistic geography, history, and science ==
The Langdale travels from Liverpool past the Azores, to the Barbados capital Bridgetown, Trinidad, the Venezuela coast, Curaçao and Cuba. The places are described from shipboard – the only place Cam goes ashore is the fictional Venezuelan port of Boca del Sol.

The outward cargo is assorted manufactured goods. For the return voyage they load up with sugar at Cárdenas, one of Cuba's principal sugar ports.

They experience gales in the Atlantic Ocean, a tropical storm in the Caribbean, and enough baking heat to cause a fire in the hold. On the way home the salvaged vessel Arno makes landfall at Bishop Rock, Isles of Scilly before docking at Falmouth, Cornwall.

Reference is made to the pirates and buccaneers of the Spanish Main, notably the English Sir Francis Drake.

As the novel predates satellite navigation by several decades, the Langdale uses celestial navigation and a successful voyage depends on accurate sextant readings and mathematical calculation unaided by calculators. The method is explained at some length.

== See also ==
Awards
Preceded by Collected Stories for Children	Carnegie Medal recipient 1948	Succeeded by The Story of Your Home
