= Manjeet Mann =

Actress and writer

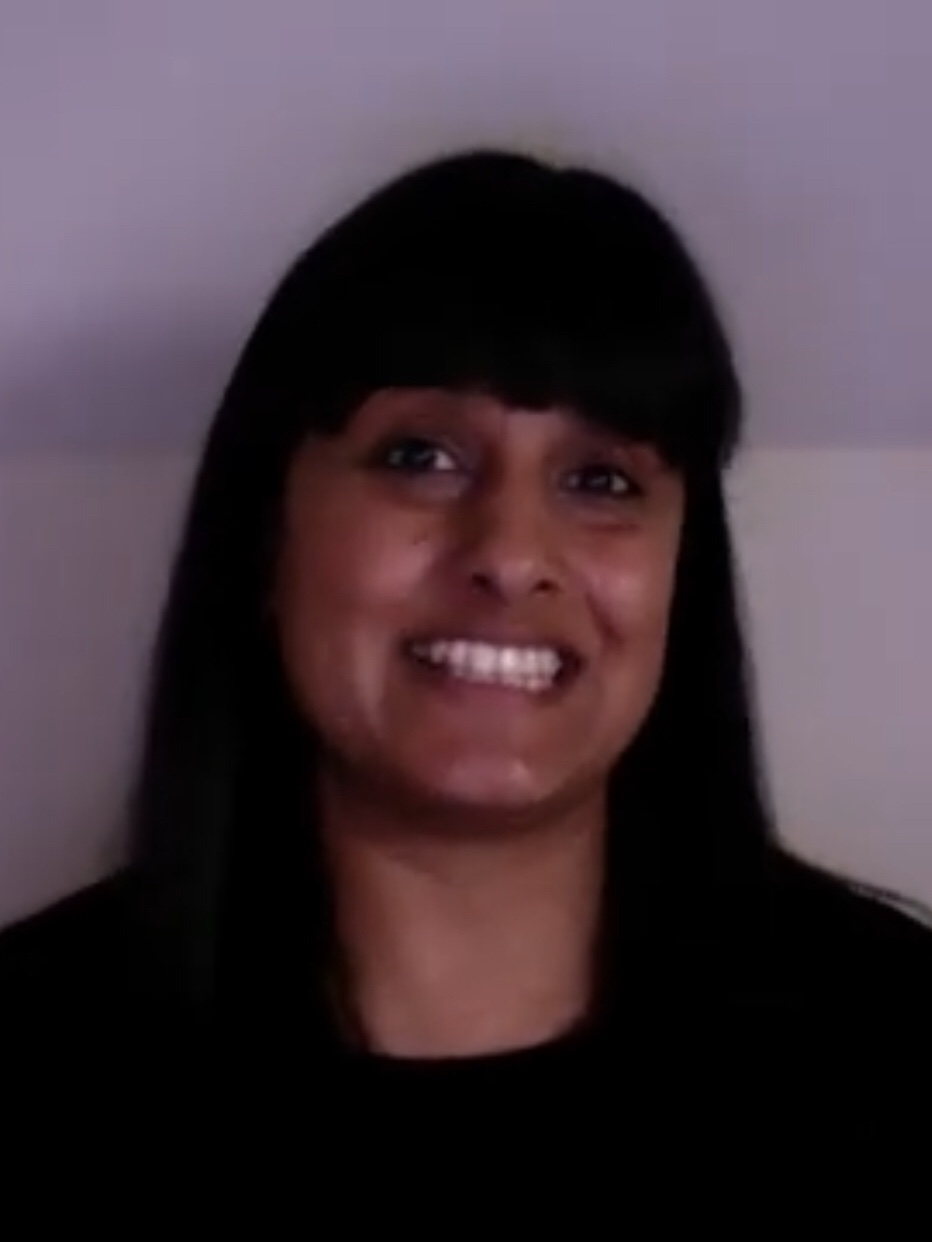
- Mann in 2022
- Education: Coventry University
- Occupations: Actress and author
- Partner: Joseph Coelho
- Writing career
- Notable awards: Costa Book Award for Children's Book (2022)
- Website: manjeetmann.com

Manjeet Mann is an actress and writer. Her novel The Crossing won the 2022 Costa Book Award for Children's Book.

== Early life ==
Mann grew up in a working class family in Walsall. She studied performing arts at Coventry University.

== Career ==
Mann started her career as an actress before turning her hand to writing.

Mann's first novel, Run Rebel, was released in 2020 and was shortlisted for the Carnegie Medal and received the Shadowers’ Choice Award for Carnegie Medal and the UKLA Book Award for Ages 11–14+; it was shortlisted for and won several other awards. She later adapted the novel into a play, directed by Tessa Walker and produced by Pilot Theatre. The play was nominated for two 2025 Offies for: Creation for Mann and receiving Best Production. Her second novel, The Crossing, was published in 2021. It won the 2021 Costa Book Award for Children's Book and was shortlisted for numerous other awards including the Carnegie Medal.

Mann later published two children's picture books. The first, Small's Big Dream, illustrated by Amanda Quartey, was published in 2022, and the second, Whirly Twirly Me, also illustrated by Amanda Quartey, was published in summer 2023.

== Personal life ==
Mann lives in Edinburgh with her partner Joseph Coelho.

== Awards and honours ==
Awards for Mann's writing
| Year | Title | Award | Result | Ref. |
|---|---|---|---|---|
| 2021 | The Crossing | Costa Book Award for Children's Book | Winner | |
| | Run, Rebel | Branford Boase Award | Shortlist | |
| | Run, Rebel | Carnegie Medal | Shortlist | |
| | Run, Rebel | Centre for Literacy in Primary Poetry Award | Shortlist | |
| | Run, Rebel | Shadowers’ Choice Award for Carnegie Medal | Winner | |
| | Run, Rebel | UKLA Book Awards: Ages 11–14+ | Winner | |
| | Run, Rebel | Sheffield Children's Book Awards:YA Category | Winner | |
| | Run, Rebel | Diverse Book Award YA category | Winner | |
| 2022 | The Crossing | Sheffield Children's Book Awards: YA Category | Winner | |
| | The Crossing | Sheffield Children’s Book Award: Overall | Winner | |
| | The Crossing | Centre for Literacy in Primary Poetry Award | Shortlist | [7] |
| | The Crossing | Carnegie Medal | Shortlist | |
| | The Crossing | Jhalak Prize: Children's & YA | Shortlist | |
| | The Crossing | Waterstones Children's Book Prize for Older Fiction | Shortlist | |
| | The Crossing | Diverse Book Awards | Shortlist | |
| | The Crossing | YA Book Prize | Shortlist | |
| 2023 | The Crossing | UKLA Book Awards: Ages 11–14+ | Winner | |
| 2023 | Small's Big Dream | UKLA Book Awards: Ages 3–6+ | Shortlist | |
| | Small's Big Dream | Diverse Book Awards: Picture Book Category | Shortlist | |
| | Small's Big Dream | Diverse Book Awards: Picture Book Category Readers Choice Award | Winner | |
| 2025 | Run, Rebel (stage adaptation) | Offie for Creation Offie nomination for Production | Finalist Winner | |
| 2026 | ROAR | Jhalak Prize: Children's & YA | Shortlist | |
| 2026 | ROAR | Diverse Book Awards YA Category | Shortlist | |

=== Children's picture books ===
- Small's Big Dream, illustrated by Amanda Quartey (2022)
- Whirly Twirly Me, illustrated by Amanda Quartey (2023)
- Magic, Magic, Everywhere, illustrated by Noopur Thakur (2024)

=== Young adult novels ===
- Run, Rebel (2020)
- The Crossing (2021)
- Roar (2025)
