= Agnes Allen (author) =

English author of children's books (1898–1958)

- Allen in the 1940s
- Born: 1898; England, United Kingdom
- Died: 1958 (aged 59–60)
- Occupation: Author
- Known for: Children's books, Winner of the Carnegie Medal
- Notable work: The Story of Your Home; The Story of the Village; The Story of Our Parliament; The Story of the Highway; The Story of Clothes
- Spouse: Jack Allen
- Awards: Carnegie Medal (1949)

Agnes Allen (1898–1958) was an English author of children's books. She won the Carnegie Medal for British children's books in 1949 for The Story of Your Home, a non-fiction book that traces the history of homes in the British Isles, from caves to castles to skyscrapers. It was the second non-fiction book to win the Carnegie Medal, and featured detailed line drawings by Allen and her husband, Jack.

Agnes Allen's Story series began with The Story of the Village in 1947. She wrote a number of other books in this series, mainly about social history and art. They included The Story of Our Parliament (1949), The Story of the Highway (1950) and The Story of Clothes (1955). Her four-book series entitled Living in History took a comprehensive approach to particular eras rather than looking at one aspect throughout the ages.
