= Raider (novel) =

1995 children's novel by Susan Gates

- First edition (publ. Oxford University Press)
- Author: Susan Gates
- Publisher: Oxford University Press
- Publication date: January 1, 1995
- ISBN: 9780192716446

Raider is a 1995 children's novel by Susan Gates. It was shortlisted for the Carnegie Medal and the Guardian Children's Fiction Award.

The novel is about an investigation by the two main characters (Flora and Maddy) into the mystery surrounding the death of a boy who fell into the sea from the Arctic Raider, a deep-sea trawler, many years before.
