= Henry W. M. Hodges =

British archaeologist and academic

Henry Woolmington Mackenzie Hodges (19 July 1920 – 19 May 1997) was a British archaeologist and academic who taught at Queen's University, Belfast, the University of London Institute of Archaeology, and Queen's University, Kingston, Ontario. He played a crucial role in the developing field of archaeological conservation and the study of ancient artifacts, and the establishment of conservation training programmes in the U.K. and Canada. He also published books on, and contributed to journals dedicated to, his areas of expertise.

== Early life and education ==
Hodges was born at Deddington, Oxfordshire, the son of general practitioner George Montague Williams Hodges and Barbara (née Webber), Hodges went up to St John's College, Cambridge in 1938 to study human pathology, but his studies were interrupted by the onset of the Second World War, and he left in 1940.

== Career ==
Hodges served in the Royal Naval Air Branch, flying as an observer in Swordfishes with the Atlantic Convoys until he was invalided out with tuberculosis. He taught at a preparatory school from 1946 to 1949, but again suffered from tuberculosis and spent a year in hospital recuperating. At this time he developed an interest in archaeology, and when recovered studied at the University of London Institute of Archaeology from 1951 to 1953 for the Postgraduate Diploma in Prehistoric Archaeology. Having completed his studies there, Hodges was appointed assistant lecturer in archaeology at Queen's University, Belfast, where he began experimental work in early technology and developed his interest in conservation. From 1957, he was lecturer in Archaeological Technology at the University of London Institute of Archaeology, working alongside Ione Gedye, who had started the teaching of conservation there. By the late 1950s conservation was coming into its own as a discipline, having previously been the responsibility of chemists and specialized restorers; the International Institute for Conservation was established in the early 1950s (Hodges would become a Fellow in 1960, serve as Treasurer from 1971 to 1974, and Secretary General from 1988 to 1994, being awarded an Honorary Fellowship at his retirement in recognition of his contributions to the field). Gedye and Hodges combined the study of chemistry, archaeology, and ancient materials and technology with methods of conservation treatment, alongside practical work on excavated and museum objects. Hodges's focus on researching ancient technology led to a series of annual lectures given to archaeologists and conservators, and presentation of his research in two books- Artifacts: An Introduction to Early Materials and Technology (1964), widely respected as a "clear and well-organized" "indispensable" "classic text" and Technology in the Ancient World (1970).

Having established an international reputation, Hodges was invited to become Professor of Artifacts Conservation at Queen's University, Kingston, Ontario, Canada; there, he succeeded in linking archaeological conservation with an existing programme dedicated to preservation of paper and paintings. From 1977 he served as Director of the Art Conservation Program at the university. He returned to the U.K. in 1987, and lived at Burwash, East Sussex.

Hodges wrote and contributed to numerous books and publications; aside from his major works, Artifacts and Technology in the Ancient World, he also produced Pottery: A Technical History (1972), collaborated with his Institute of Archaeology colleagues Edward Pyddoke and Marjorie Maitland Howard on Ancient Britons: How They Lived in 1969, which "recreate[d] life in the British Isles from the Old Stone Age to the Roman invasions", and produced a successor to Technology in the Ancient World with Technology in the Medieval World. His contributions to journals include: in 1958, "The Bronze Age Moulds of the British Isles, part I: Scotland and the North of England- Moulds of Stone and Clay", in Sibrium, vol. 4, pp. 129–36, and in 1960 "part II: England and Wales- Moulds of Stone and Bronze" in vol. 5, pp. 153–62; in 1987, he wrote on conservation treatment of ceramics in the field for In Situ Archaeological Conservation, of which he was editor. He also participated in excavations, such as that in 1953 at Castle Hill, Thurgarton, Nottinghamshire, a report on which Hodges produced for Transactions of the Thoroton Society in 1954, which included a stone coffin and examined pottery sherds that had been excavated from the Neolithic causewayed enclosure at Windmill Hill, Avebury, Wiltshire by Alexander Keiller, producing a report on his findings.

== Personal life ==
In 1965, he married (Bernadette) Jane Davies; they had a son and a daughter.
