= Janni Howker =

British writer of young adult and children's literature

Janni Howker is a British writer of adult and children's fiction who has adapted her own books for the screen. She has worked across the UK running creative writing workshops for adults and children, and is involved in several arts development programmes.

== Life ==
Howker was born in Cyprus to a British military family with Lancashire roots. She lives in a cottage near the "very remote" Scottish border, and several of her books are set in the region, which she calls "my inspiration". The most important may be Martin Farrell, which features a boy caught in the midst of the bloody feuds of the Border Reivers.

== Awards ==
The Nature of the Beast won the 1985 Whitbread Children's Book Award.

For The Nature of the Beast and again next year for Isaac Campion in 1986, Howker was a highly commended runner-up for the annual Carnegie Medals from the Library Association, recognising the year's best children's book by a British subject. (From 1979 to 2002 the distinction was approximately annual, with 29 high commendations in a 24-year period including Howker alone for both 1985 and 1986.)

- International Reading Award
- Tom-Gallon Award
- Observer Teenage Fiction Award
- Somerset Maugham Award

== Works ==
The U.S. review service Kirkus Reviews covered at least three of Howker's books (‡). Badger on the Barge and The Topiary Garden garnered starred reviews and the service called Isaac Campion "another glowing novel" and "unforgettable".

=== Novels ===
- The Nature of the Beast (Julia MacRae Books, 1985)
- Isaac Campion (MacRae, 1986)‡
- Martin Farrell (MacRae, 1994)

=== Short fiction ===
- Badger on the Barge (MacRae, 1984)‡ —collection of five stories (200pp), short-listed for both the Whitbread Children's Book Award and the Carnegie Medal
- The Topiary Garden (MacRae, 1993)‡ —one story from Badger on the Barge, illustrated by Anthony Browne (64pp)
- Walk with a Wolf (Walker, 1997) —children's picture book illustrated by Sarah Fox-Davies
- "Mud" —short story
