= The Lark on the Wing =

1950 children's novel by Elfrida Vipont

- First edition cover
- Author: Elfrida Vipont
- Publisher: Oxford University Press
- Publication date: January 1, 1950
- Award: Carnegie Medal (literary award) (1950)

The Lark on the Wing is a 1950 children's novel by Elfrida Vipont. A sequel to her 1948 The Lark in the Morn, it was published by Oxford University Press.

== Synopsis ==
After Kit Haverard's father dies, leaving her destitute, she follows her dream of becoming a professional singer.

== Reception ==
The Lark on the Wing won the Carnegie Medal for books published in 1950.

Kirkus Reviews considered that Kit's "growth as a woman and as a singer is developed with the same warmth that runs through the first book" and noted the character of singing instructor Papa Andreas as being "particularly rememberable [sic]", observing that the "characters tower over the events in their isolated lives."

Awards
Preceded by The Story of Your Home	Carnegie Medal recipient 1950	Succeeded by The Wool-Pack
