= Mary K. Harris =

British children's author (1905–1966)

Mary Kathleen Harris
- Born: 22 September 1905; Harrow, Middlesex, England
- Died: 2 June 1966 (aged 60); Watford, Hertfordshire, England
- Occupation: Writer
- Writing career
- Period: 1941–1966
- Genre: Children's literature
- Notable work: The Bus Girls

Mary Kathleen Harris (22 September 1905 – 2 June 1966) was a British children's writer who was commended twice for the Carnegie Medal, for The Bus Girls and Seraphina. Harris was notable for trying to revive girls' school stories by introducing new realism and restraint into the writing.

== Biography ==
Harris was born in Harrow, Middlesex in 1905, to Roland Edward Harris and Mary Mackey Harris. The family was artistic and she considered becoming a painter before turning to writing. She was educated at Harrow County School for Girls. She was a Catholic. She died in Watford in 1966.

Her first children's book, Gretel at St. Bride's, a story about a refugee from Nazi Germany at a British boarding school, was published in 1941. Several of her books were school stories and some were religious in nature. Her final book was published posthumously.

== Bibliography ==
- Gretel at St. Bride's, 1941
- The Wolf, 1946
- The Niche over the Door, 1948
- Fear at My Heart, 1951
- Henrietta of St. Hilary's, 1953
- Thomas, 1956
- My Darling from the Lion's Mouth, 1956 (US title I Am Julie)
- A Safe Lodging, 1957
- Emily and the Headmistress, 1958
- Lucia Wilmot, 1959
- Elizabeth, 1961
- Penny's Way, 1963
- Helena: A Patron Saint Book, 1964
- The Bus Girls, 1964
- Seraphina, 1965
- Jessica on Her Own, 1967
