= Nathanael Lessore =

English author

- Born: 1990 (age 35–36); Camberwell, London, England
- Education: University of East London
- Years active: 2022–present

Nathanael Leon T. Lessore (born 1990) is an English author of children's and young adult literature. His work has earned a number of accolades, including the Branford Boase Award, a Waterstones Children's Book Prize and a Jhalak Prize.

== Early life ==
Lessore was born one of eight in Camberwell, South London to a French father and a Malagasy mother and grew up on the North Peckham Estate. Lessore attended St Thomas the Apostle College. After leaving, he worked various jobs and started writing at age 24 while working in a call centre. Lessore completed a year-long foundation course and graduated with a degree in Creative Writing from the University of East London. He worked in marketing before pursuing writing professionally.

== Career ==
During the COVID-19 lockdown, Lessore reworked the three chapters he started for his dissertation. Via a four-way auction and two-book deal in 2022, Hot Key Books (a Bonnier imprint) acquired the rights to publish Lessore's debut novel Steady for This in 2023. Steady for This won the Branford Boase Award. It was also shortlisted for a Jhalak Prize and the Carnegie Medal.

This was followed by Lessore's second novel King of Nothing in 2024. King of Nothing won the Waterstones Children's Book Prize for Older Readers, the Jhalak Prize in the Children's and Young Adult category, and the Carnegie Medal's Shadowers' Choice Award.

Announced in 2024, Little Tiger acquired the rights to publish Lessore's middle grade Not My Superpower series illustrated by Simran Singh. In addition, Lessore reunited with Hot Key Books for the publication of What Happens Online in 2025. What Happens Online was shortlisted for a Books Are My Bag Readers' Awards and a British Audio Award.

In 2026, Lessore was nominated for the Ruth Rendell Award. His next teen novel Against All Odds featured on the 2026 World Book Day list.

== Bibliography ==
=== Standalone ===
- Steady for This (2023) (released as Dropping Beats in the U.S.)
- King of Nothing (2024)
- What Happens Online (2025)
- Against All Odds (2026)
- Like A Brother (2026)

=== Not My Superpower ===
- Solving Crime is NOT My Superpower (2025)
- Time Travel Is NOT My Superpower (2025)

== Accolades ==
Year	Award	Category	Title	Result	Ref.
2024	Jhalak Prize	Children's and Young Adult	Steady for This	Shortlisted	
2024	Carnegie Medal		Steady for This	Shortlisted	
2024	Branford Boase Award		Steady for This	Won	
2025	Waterstones Children's Book Prize	Older Readers	King of Nothing	Won	
2025	Jhalak Prize	Children's and Young Adult	King of Nothing	Won	
2025	Carnegie Medal	Shadowers' Choice Award	King of Nothing	Won	
2025	Books Are My Bag Readers' Awards	Young Adult Fiction	What Happens Online	Shortlisted	
2025	British Audio Awards	Best Audiobook: Young Adult	What Happens Online	Shortlisted	
2026	ALCS Annual Awards	Ruth Rendell Award		Shortlisted	
