= The Wool-Pack =

1951 novel by Cynthia Harnett

- Front cover of the first edition
- Author: Cynthia Harnett
- Illustrator: Cynthia Harnett
- Language: English
- Genre: Children's historical novel
- Publisher: Methuen
- Publication date: 25 October 1951
- Publication place: United Kingdom
- Media type: Print (hardcover)
- Pages: 184 pp (first edition)
- OCLC: 621582
- LC Class: PZ7.H228 Wo; PZ7.H228 Ni

The Wool-Pack is a children's historical novel written and illustrated by Cynthia Harnett, published by Methuen in 1951. It was the first published of four children's novels that Harnett set in 15th-century England. She won the annual Carnegie Medal from the Library Association, recognising it as the year's best children's book by a British subject.

G. P. Putnam's Sons published the first U.S. edition in 1953, entitled Nicholas and the Wool-Pack: an adventure story of the Middle Ages, an inaccurate title as it is based in the time of Henry Tudor. In 1984 it was reissued under yet another title, The Merchant's Mark (Minneapolis: Lerner). Both American editions retained Harnett's illustrations.

A television miniseries based on the story was broadcast by the BBC in 1970.

== Plot summary ==
Set in the Cotswolds near Burford, Oxfordshire, The Wool-Pack begins in 1493 when Nicholas Fetterlock, the twelve-year-old son of a rich wool merchant, learns from his father that he is betrothed to Cecily Bradshaw, the daughter of a rich cloth merchant. Within the guild, Nicholas discovers the work of swindlers who could ruin his father's business. Nicholas, Cecily, and a friend determine to stop them.

== Critical reception ==
Kirkus Reviews called the first U.S. edition (Putnam, 1953) "attractively bound and accurately illustrated". It credited the story with "the feeling of early renaissance unity".

== Adaptation ==
The Wool Pack was adapted by the BBC as a 90-minute film entitled A Stranger on the Hills, televised in 1970 as a three-part series for children. It starred Raymond Millross as Nicholas Fetterlock, with Godfrey Quigley and Thelma Barlow as his parents. The series was filmed by the BBC in Bristol.

== See also ==
- History of wool industry
- Timeline of clothing and textiles technology
- Worshipful Company of Drapers

Awards
| Preceded by The Lark on the Wing | Carnegie Medal recipient 1951 | Succeeded by The Borrowers |
