= Margaret McDonald (writer) =

Scottish author

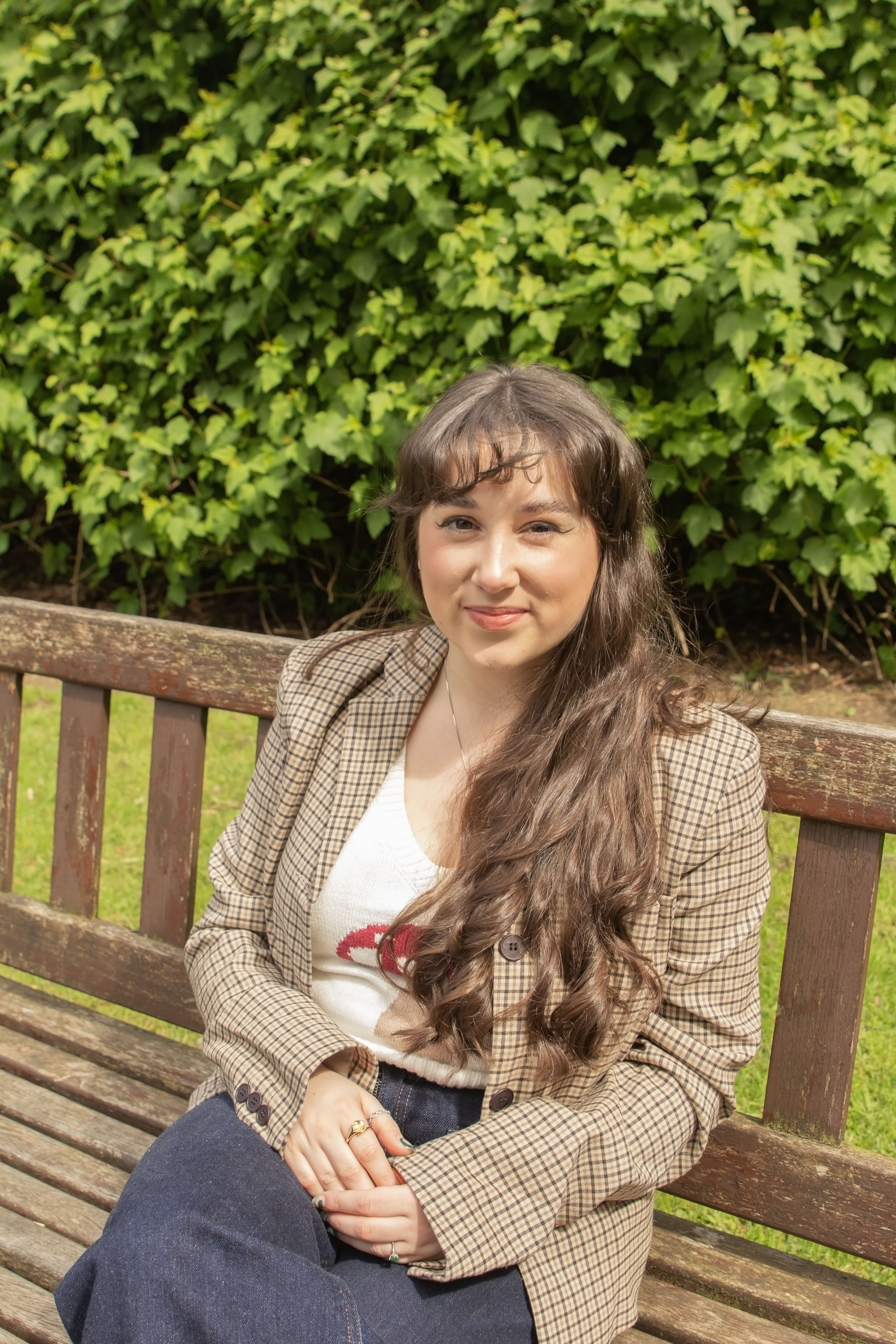
Author Margaret McDonald

Margaret McDonald is a Scottish author who lives in Glasgow. In 2025, she became the youngest winner of the Carnegie Medal for Writing for her young adult novel Glasgow Boys.

== Early life and education ==
Margaret McDonald was born in Glasgow, Scotland. She was raised in East Kilbride, South Lanarkshire. She is from a working-class background and her family speaks Scots.

McDonald became passionate about creative writing through writing fan fiction and short stories as a teenager. She went on to graduate from the University of Strathclyde with a Bachelor's degree in Creative Writing with English, followed by a Master's degree in English Literature from the University of Glasgow.

== Career ==
McDonald began writing her debut novel Glasgow Boys in 2017 while recovering from an operation related to her Crohn's disease. She began to work seriously on the novel after graduating from the University of Strathclyde in July 2020; the Covid-19 lockdown was underway, and McDonald used the time to focus on her writing as she was shielding due to being high-risk. She contacted approximately 60 agents before finding representation.

Glasgow Boys was published by Faber & Faber in 2024. It won McDonald the Carnegie Medal for Writing, making her, at 27 years old, its youngest ever winner. She donated her £5000 winnings to Action for Children. She also won the Branford Boase Award and UKLA Book Award that year, and was shortlisted for the YA Book Prize and the Waterstones Children’s Book Prize.

McDonald's upcoming novel, Sunshine Quarry, is about four friends caught in a storm in the Scottish Highlands.

McDonald has previously worked in the NHS as a vaccine assistant and administrative assistant.
