= Marryat =

Marryat or Marryatt is a surname. It may refer to:

== Marryat ==
- Augusta Marryat (c. 1828–1899), British children's writer and illustrator
- Charles Marryat (1827–1906), Dean of Adelaide from 1887 to 1906
- Emilia Marryat (1835–1875), English author of children's books
- Frank Marryat (1826–1855), sailor, artist, and author
- Frederick Marryat (1792–1848), English Royal Navy officer, a novelist, and an acquaintance of Charles Dickens
- Florence Marryat (1833–1899), British author and actress
- George Selwyn Marryat (1840–1896), British country gentleman and angler
- Horace Marryat (1818–1887), English traveler and author
- Joseph Marryat (1757–1824), English businessman and British member of Parliament for Horsham
- Thomas Marryat (1730–1792), English physician, medical writer and wit
- Zephaniah Marryat (1684–1754), English nonconformist minister

== Marryatt ==
- Arthur A. Marryatt (1873–1949), New Zealand sports administrator
- Carlos Marryatt (born 1968), New Zealand cyclist
- Tony Marryatt (born 1954), New Zealand civil servant

== See also ==
- J. T. Marryat Hornsby (1857–1921), New Zealand politician
