= Marjorie Maitland Howard =

Modeller, sculptor, and book illustrator (1898–1983)

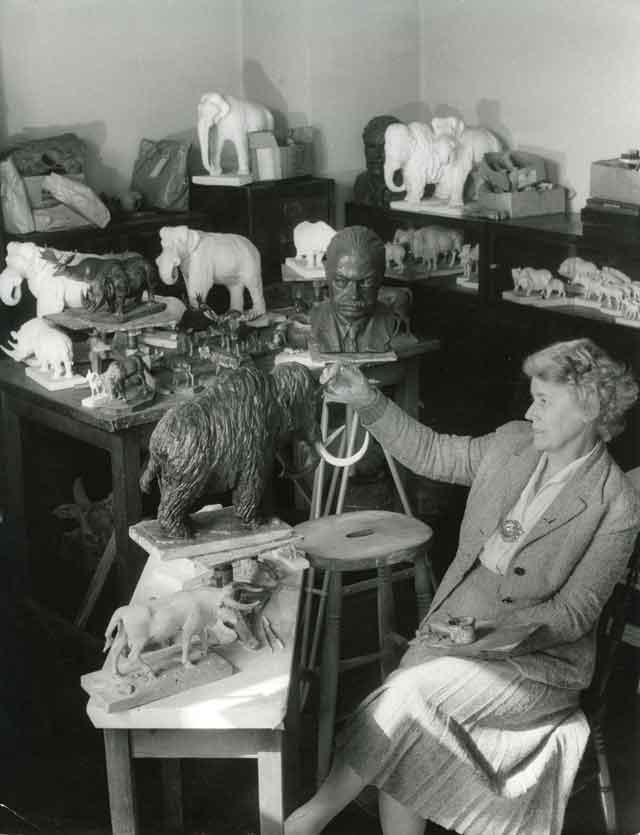
- Marjorie Maitland Howard, pictured around 1958, with her bust of V. Gordon Childe and models created for Frederick Zeuner.
- Born: Margaret Maitland Howard; 31 July 1898; Barnet, United Kingdom
- Died: 31 August 1983 (aged 85)
- Education: Royal Academy School of Art
- Occupations: Modeller, sculptor, book illustrator
- Employer: Institute of Archaeology

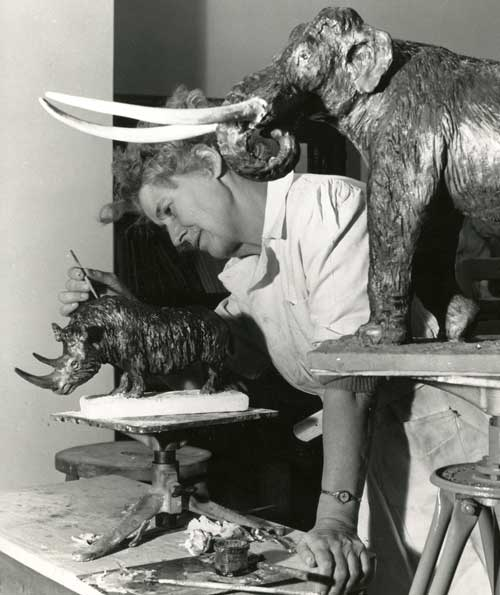

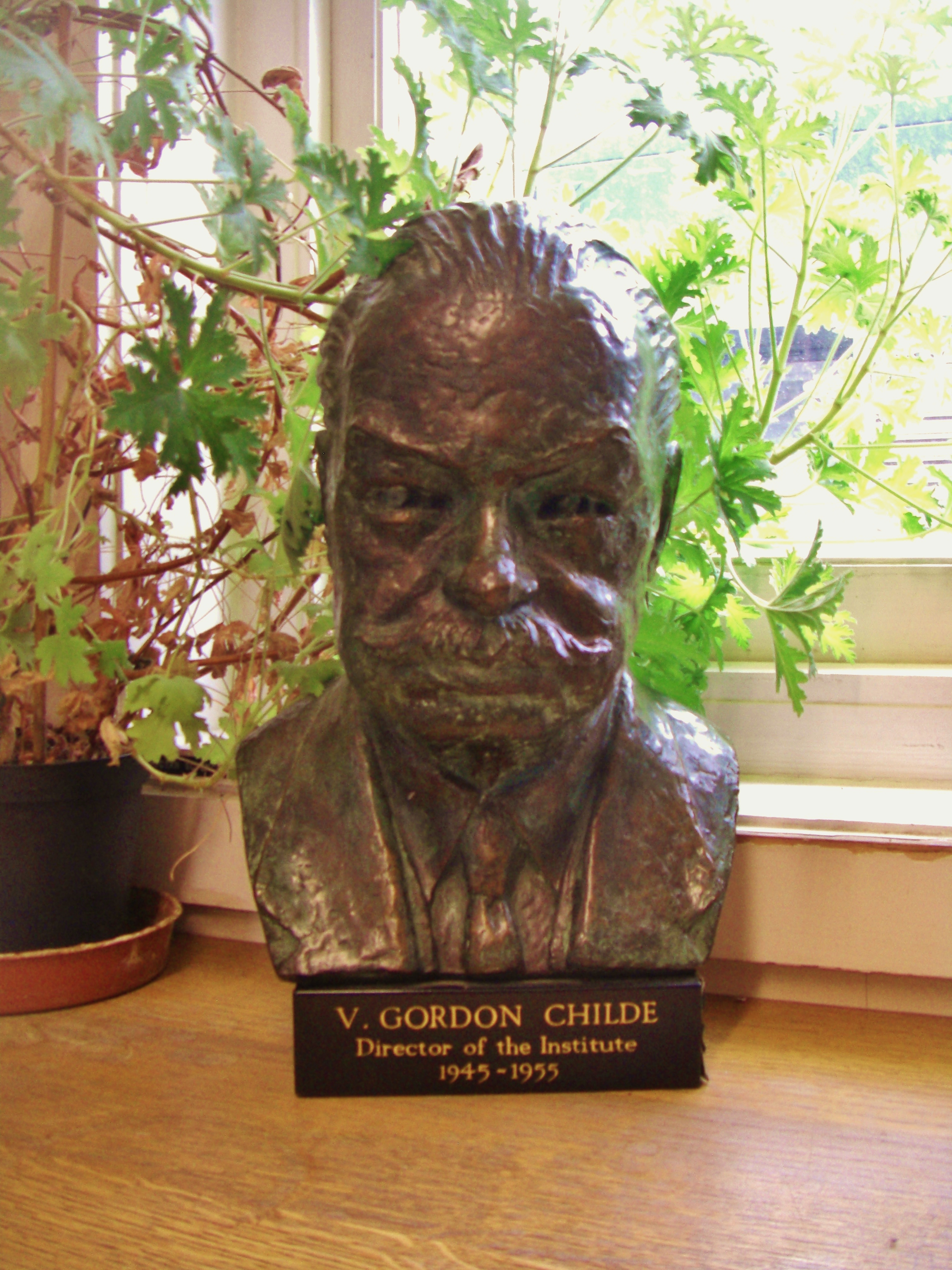
Bust of V. Gordon Childe. Marjorie Howard, c. 1958. Institute of Archaeology library, London.

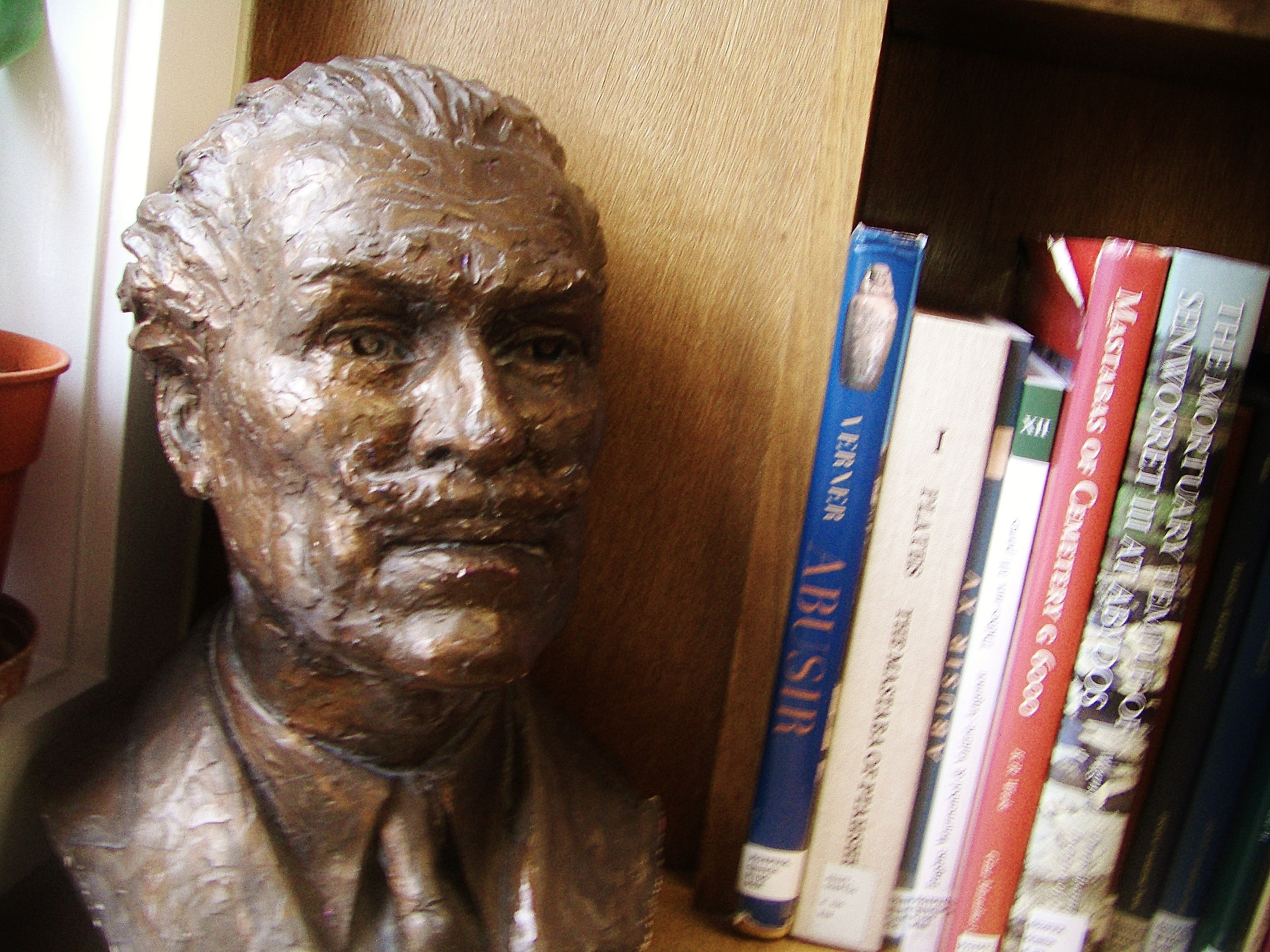
A bust of Mortimer Wheeler in the Institute of Archaeology library. Probably the bust made by Marjorie Howard.

Margaret Maitland Howard, professionally and commonly known as Marjorie Maitland Howard (31 July 1898 – 31 August 1983) was a versatile modeller, sculptor, and book illustrator who was associated with the Institute of Archaeology in London where she worked from 1948 to 1960.

== Early life ==
Daughter of artist and civil servant Henry James Howard, Margaret (she was always however known as "Marjorie") Maitland Howard was born 31 July 1898 in Barnet, and grew up at Sutton, Surrey, where she spent most of her life. She was educated at the Royal Academy School of Art from 1917, and exhibited regularly between 1923 and 1935 at the Academy's summer exhibitions.

== Career ==
Howard had an early career in book illustration, producing an illustrated edition of the Fables of Aesop that was published by John Lane at The Bodley Head in 1926. She also illustrated Elizabeth Ward's Who goes to the wood (Lutterworth, 1940).

In 1946, she illustrated Frederick Zeuner's Dating the past: An introduction to geochronology which went through several editions and was still in print in 1970.

From 1948 until her retirement in 1960, she worked at the Institute of Archaeology, now part of University College London. She created models for Frederick Zeuner to use in his lectures and busts of V. Gordon Childe (c.1958) and Mortimer Wheeler.

In 1956, she supervised archaeological work at Balawat for the British Institute for the Study of Iraq and subsequently prepared drawings of the Balawat Gates.

== Later life ==
After her retirement from the Institute of Archaeology she continued to illustrate books, collaborating particularly with Ian Wolfran Cornwall on his series of books about the prehistoric world. She died 31 August 1983.

== Selected books illustrated by Marjorie Maitland Howard ==
- Fables of Æsop. John Lane, The Bodley Head, London, 1926.
- Who goes to the wood. Lutterworth, London, 1940. (Text by Fay Inchfawn, pseud. Elizabeth Rebecca Ward.)
- Dating the past: An introduction to geochronology. Methuen, London, 1946. (Text by Frederick Zeuner)
- The making of man. Phoenix House, London, 1960. (Text by Ian Wolfran Cornwall)
- Animal ancestors. Phoenix House, London, 1964. (Text by Sonia Cole)
- The world of ancient man. Phoenix House, London, 1964. (Text by Ian Wolfran Cornwall)
- Hunter's half-moon. J Baker, London, 1967. (Text by Ian Wolfran Cornwall)
- Prehistoric animals and their hunters. Faber & Faber, London, 1968. (Text by Ian Wolfran Cornwall)
- Ancient Britons. John Baker, London, 1969. (Text by Henry Hodges and Edward Pyddoke) ISBN 0212998463

== See also ==
- Archaeological illustration
