= Arthur A. Marryatt =

New Zealand sports administrator

Arthur Albert Marryatt (1873 – 23 November 1949) was a New Zealand sports administrator, who represented New Zealand on the International Olympic Committee from 1919 to 1923, when he was replaced by Joseph Firth.

He was an accountant, and was three times President of the New Zealand Amateur Athletic Association.

He was born in Milton, Otago, but had resided in Wellington for more than 40 years when he died in Wellington Hospital in his 76th year.
