= Glasgow Boys (novel) =

2024 novel by Margaret McDonald

- First edition cover
- Author: Margaret McDonald
- Genre: Young adult novel
- Set in: Glasgow
- Publisher: Faber & Faber
- Publication date: 2 May 2024
- Pages: 352
- Awards: Carnegie Medal for Writing; Branford Boase Award; UKLA Book Award
- ISBN: 9780571382972
- Website: Glasgow Boys at Faber

Glasgow Boys is a young adult novel by Scottish novelist Margaret McDonald, published by Faber & Faber in 2024. It was awarded the 2025 Carnegie Medal.

== Plot summary ==
The novel is set in Glasgow, a major city in Scotland. It is a dual narrative, alternating the voices of Finlay (18), who has just aged out of the care system, and Banjo (17), who is beginning with a new foster family.

== Awards ==
Glasgow Boys was awarded the 2025 Carnegie Medal for Writing, the author being the youngest ever recipient of the award. In her acceptance speech, McDonald stressed her desire to highlight "the difficulties of making your way through a world that is essentially not built for you".

The novel also won the 2025 Branford Boase Award as a debut young adult novel.

In the 2025 UKLA Book Awards, chosen by teachers, Glasgow Boys was the winner in the 11 to 14+ section.

== Reception ==
In a review for Books for Keeps, Joy Court describes Glasgow Boys as an outstanding novel "on every measure" and "gorgeously written". She says the author "portrays a refreshingly nuanced and authentic view of the care system" and in particular praises the characterisation.

Awards
Preceded by The Boy Lost in the Maze	Carnegie Medal recipient 2025	Succeeded by Wolf Siren
