= Children's Laureate =

Award for children's literature

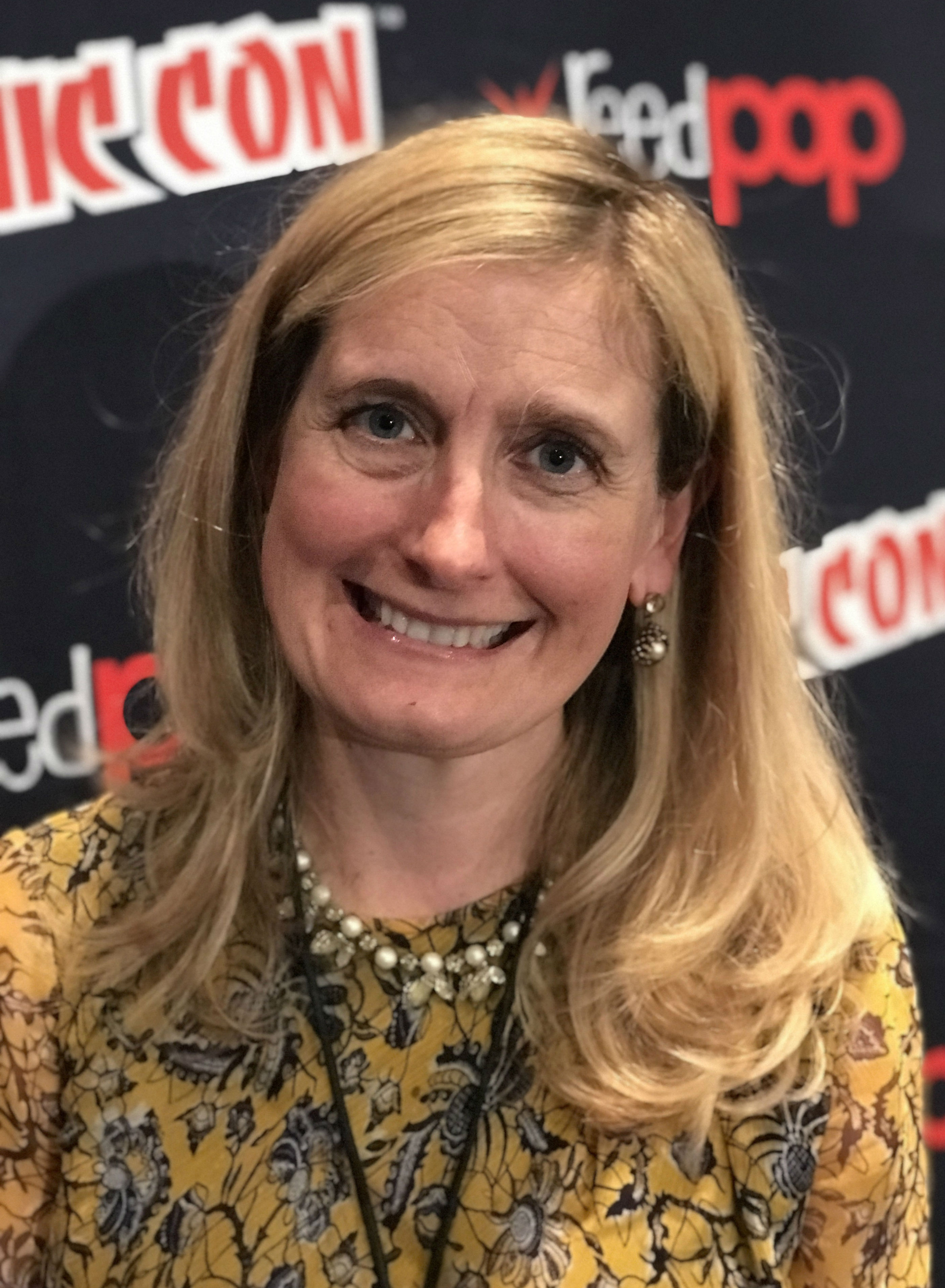
Cressida Cowell, the 2019–2022 Laureate

Children's Laureate, now known as the Waterstones Children's Laureate, is a position awarded in the United Kingdom once every two years to a "writer or illustrator of children's books to celebrate outstanding achievement in their field". The role promotes the importance of children's literature, reading, creativity and storytelling while promoting the right of every child to enjoy a lifetime of books and stories. Each Laureate uses their tenure to focus on an aspect of children's books – these have included poetry, storytelling, readers with disabilities and illustration.

The aim of the Waterstones Children's Laureateship is to celebrate and promote creativity and storytelling, and to inspire all children to read a rich and diverse range of stories. The Laureateship also promotes the importance of children's books, reading and champions the right of every child to enjoy a life rich in books and stories. The post stemmed from a discussion between the poet laureate Ted Hughes and children's writer Michael Morpurgo. The Waterstones Children's Laureate receives a £30,000 bursary and an inscribed silver medal.

The main sponsor of the Waterstones Children's Laureate is Waterstones, with additional funding from Arts Council England and support from children's publishers. A selection panel considers nominations from a range of organisations representing librarians and sellers, including the International Board on Books for Young People. The Waterstones Children's Laureate is managed by BookTrust, who supports the Laureate and organise events.

The post is currently held by Patrice Lawrence.

== UK officeholders ==
No.	Image	Name	Term	Notes
1		Quentin Blake	1999–2001	Blake was appointed the first UK Children's Laureate in 1999. He highlighted the art and joy of illustration and also came up with the idea for the arts charity The Quentin Blake Centre for Illustration. In 2000 he published Laureate's Progress, "a kind of diary in pictures".
2		Anne Fine	2001–2003	Fine promoted the importance of children's reading and was dedicated to raising the profile of libraries. During her time as Children's Laureate she also launched the My Home Library scheme, encouraging children to build their own libraries at home.
3		Michael Morpurgo	2003–2005	Nearly five years after conceiving the idea of the Waterstones Children's Laureate, Morpurgo took on the role. During his term, He toured schools to promote “literature before literacy” and encouraged children to find or rediscover the joy of reading and creative writing.
4		Jacqueline Wilson	2005–2007	Wilson encouraged children their parents and carers to read out loud together. She toured the UK and Ireland, speaking to over 40,000 children and adults, and developed the book Great Books to Read Aloud. Judges chaired by Shami Chakrabarti, director of pressure group Liberty
5		Michael Rosen	2007–2009	Rosen's emphasis was children's poetry during his term. He developed online resources for teachers including video tips, book recommendations and advice for making classrooms more poetry friendly.
6		Anthony Browne	2009–2011	Browne focused on the development of visual literacy for his tenure. His biggest project, The Shape Game, brought together 45 writers, artists, illustrators and celebrities to create artwork to raise money for children's charity Rainbow Trust. Judges chaired by Andrew Motion, Poet Laureate from 1999 to 2009
7		Julia Donaldson	2011–2013	During her tenure Donaldson did a six-week library tour, visiting 38 libraries to celebrate libraries as a precious community resource at a time when many were under threat. Another of her priorities was celebrating performance and projects including workshops for deaf children, developing an interactive website with resources.
8		Malorie Blackman	2013–2015	Blackman's major project was setting up the YA Lit Con (YALC), the first large-scale public literature convention dedicated entirely to teen and Young Adult books in the UK. It is now an annual event.
9		Chris Riddell	2015–2017	Riddell focused on the celebration of illustration and doodling – encouraging children to doodle every day with the Doodle A Day book, and toured the UK visiting schools, bookshops and festivals.
10		Lauren Child	2017–2019	Author-illustrator Child championed children's creativity by encouraging them to make the time to look around and ‘stare into space’. She also developed online resources to help nurture creativity and encourage children to start their own creative projects.
11		Cressida Cowell	2019–2022	Cowell's two-year term was focused on encouraging every child to read for fun. She created a ten-point charter outlining what she believed every child should have a right to. This included access to new books in schools, libraries and bookshops, to own their own book and to be creative for at least 15 minutes a week. She is the longest-serving Laureate, after having her term extended by one year due to the impact of the COVID-19 pandemic.
12		Joseph Coelho	2022–2024	
13		Frank Cottrell Boyce	2024–2026	
14		Patrice Lawrence	2026–2028	

== Comparable offices elsewhere ==
=== Australia ===
In 2008, an Australian Children's Literature Alliance was founded to select and appoints an annual Australian Children's Laureate. In fact, the first year saw two writers sharing the role. Boori Monty Pryor and Alison Lester were announced in Adelaide in December 2011, with Noni Hazlehurst as patron.

=== Ireland ===
Ireland has a Laureate na nÓg, a two-year office inaugurated by the Arts Council of Ireland in May 2010. The Arts Council of Northern Ireland is one supporter.

=== The Netherlands ===
From 2013, every two years, the Dutch Reading Foundation appoints a well-known children's books author as an ambassador for children's literature. Since 2017, this 'Kinderboekenambassadeur' has a seat in his special embassy in the Children's Book Museum in The Hague.

=== Sweden ===
The Swedish Arts Council appoints an author as "Ambassador for reading", Läsamabassadör, for a two-year office since 2011. The ambassador is announced at Gothenburg Book Fair by the Swedish Minister of Culture. As part of the tenure, the ambassador help communicate to children about books and reading.

=== United States ===
In January 2008, the Library of Congress inaugurated its National Ambassador for Young People's Literature scheme, as the U.S. equivalent of the Children's Laureate. The inaugural Ambassador was Jon Scieszka. A similar honour is awarded bi-annually by the Poetry Foundation for the Young People's Poet Laureate.

== See also ==
- Blue Peter Book Awards
- Carnegie Medal
- Comics Laureate
- Guardian Award
- Kate Greenaway Medal
- Nestlé Smarties Book Prize
- Children's Laureate Wales
