= The Story of Your Home =

Nonfiction children's book by Agnes Allen

- Front cover of first edition
- Author: Agnes Allen
- Illustrator: Agnes and Jack Allen
- Language: English
- Series: The Story of ...
- Subject: Housing in Britain from prehistory to present, Architecture
- Publisher: Faber and Faber
- Publication date: 1949; 1972, New edition
- Publication place: United Kingdom
- Media type: Print (hardcover)
- Pages: 184 pp (first edition); 188 pp (1972)
- ISBN: 0571047181 (1972)
- OCLC: 1122863
- Dewey Decimal: 301.5/4/0942
- LC Class: GT285 .A79 1972

The Story of Your Home is a non-fiction book for children about domestic architecture and domestic life in Great Britain from cave dwellings to blocks of flats. It was written by Agnes Allen, illustrated by the author and her husband Jack, and published by Faber in 1949. Agnes Allen won the annual Carnegie Medal recognising the year's best children's book by a British subject.

The Story of Your Home was one of several sequels to The Story of the Village (Faber, 1947), by Agnes Allen alone.

== Origins ==
Agnes Allen attributes the inspiration for this book to her young son's curiosity about the old Elizabethan houses in the Oxfordshire village where they lived in the summer of 1943. She realized "that thousands of children, like himself, were growing up in brick-built houses in which one turned a tap if one needed water, pressed a switch to flood a room with light, struck a match if one wanted to light a fire." Because of this, she conceived the idea of a children's book that would "describe the ordinary homes of ordinary people at different periods, right back to the days when almost everything that made up the home, including the very house itself, was there only as a result of the personal exertions of the men and woman who made up the household."

The period in which this book was published has been described as the great age of the non-fictional series. These series, sometimes by a single author, sometimes by multiple authors under a general banner, were produced by publishers with an eye to selling particularly to schools and libraries. Accounts of British social history were particularly in tune with the national regeneration of the post-war years. The dust jacket of The Story of Your Home addressed the school market directly, saying: "It is especially suitable for the upper forms of a Secondary Modern School, where it could be used as a History or Social Studies reading book, as a model and reference book for project work, and as a general reference or library book."

Agnes Allen's Story series began with The Story of the Village in 1947. She wrote a number of other books in this series, mainly about social history and art. They included The Story of Our Parliament (1949), The Story of the Highway (1950) and The Story of Clothes (1955). Her four-book series entitled Living in History took a comprehensive approach to particular eras rather than looking at one aspect throughout the ages.

== Contents ==
The Story of Your Home is addressed to British children, and uses only examples from British and Irish architecture and archaeological sites to develop its subject. It looks at the houses ordinary people lived in, as well as castles and mansions. It covers not only buildings, but also furniture, crafts, the layout of villages and towns, and the way people lived in general. Architectural details such as the development of roofs and windows are described side by side with changes in fashion and amusements and the origins of terms such as "by hook or by crook" and "humble pie". Advances in firefighting are also chronicled.

The earliest dwellings mentioned are Pin Hole in Derbyshire and Kent's Cavern near Torquay — these and other cave-dwellings are described as "the very earliest human homes in this country that we know anything about." Other chapters describe homes of different periods, including Iron Age roundhouses, mediaeval manors, Tudor mansions, later country houses and terraced houses, and, bringing it up to date, the blocks of flats and suburban homes of the post-war period.

=== Chapters ===
1. The Very First Homes
2. Man Makes Himself a House
3. The House Changes Its Shape
4. How the House Developed
5. The Manor House
6. The Town House in the Middle Ages
7. Life in the Castle and the Great House
8. More about the Way Medieval People Lived
9. Sixteenth-century Mansions
10. Secret Hiding-Places
11. Smaller Houses in the Sixteenth Century
12. Seventeenth- and Eighteenth-Century Houses
13. Inside the New Houses
14. The Home Great-Grandmamma Lived In
15. Homes of To-Day

=== Illustrations ===
The Story of Your Home has over one hundred black-and-white illustrations, including the floor plans of some buildings. The illustrations were a collaborative effort between the author and her husband, Jack Allen. They are mainly simplified sketches of typical exteriors and interiors which complement the text and form an integral part of the book. There are also some imaginative — although well-researched — recreations of earlier times such as the illustration of a prehistoric lake village.

== Reception and literary significance ==
Agnes Allen won the annual Carnegie Medal for The Story of Your Home. The premier award for British children's books has honoured only a handful of nonfiction works and not many sequels.

The Story of Your Home was the best received of the Story series, which was described as "competently written, if a little dull, and reasonably well-documented."

Its educational merit was stressed: "Any parent, relative or friend wishing to stimulate the historical sense of a young person, could not do better - if he can bear to part with the book himself - than to make a gift of it."

== See also ==
Awards
Preceded by Sea Change	Carnegie Medal recipient 1949	Succeeded by The Lark on the Wing
