= Joseph Coelho =

British poet and children's book author

Joseph Coelho OBE FRSL
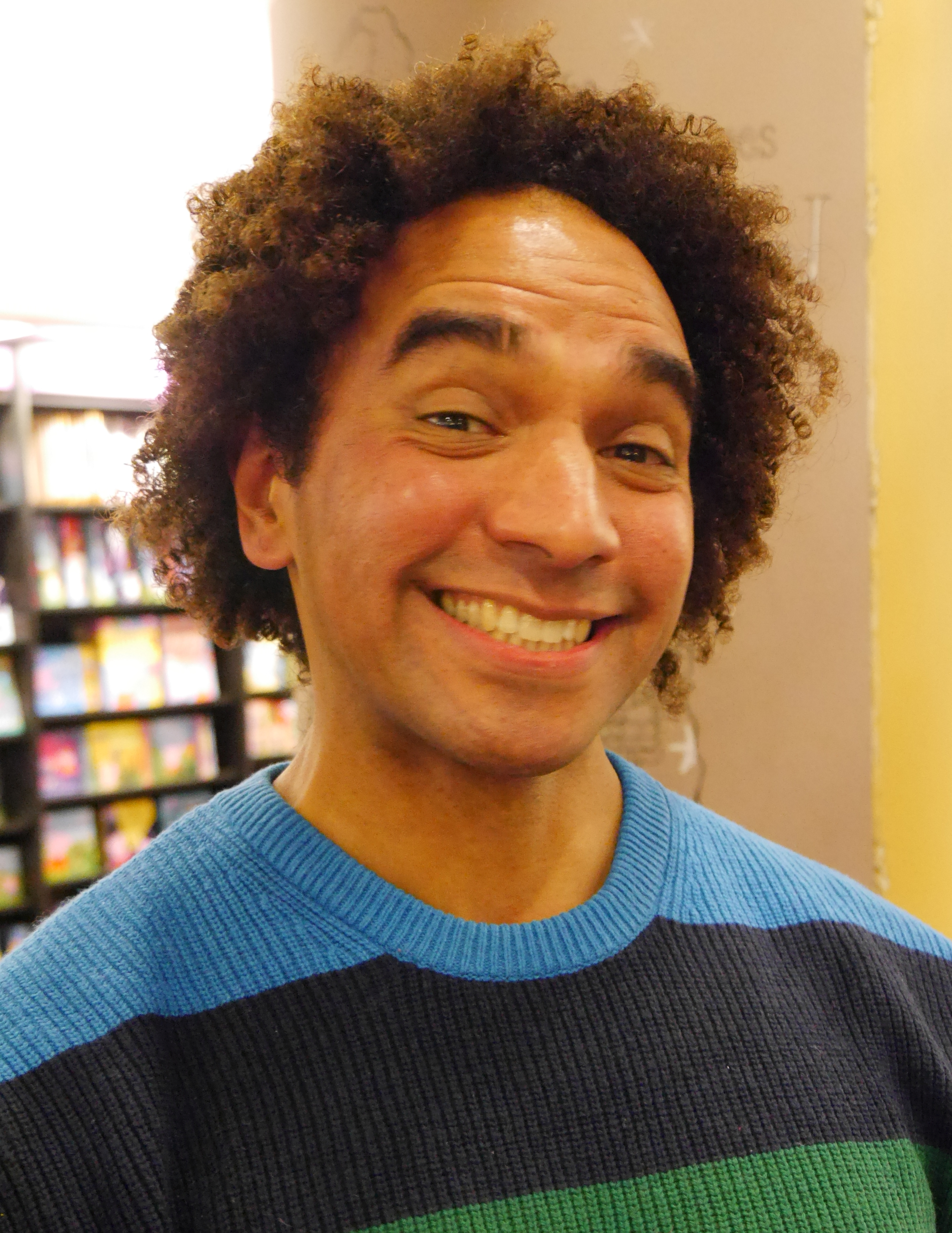
- Coelho in Waterstones, Piccadilly, 2022
- Born: Joseph Aaron Coelho; Roehampton, England
- Education: University College London
- Occupations: Poet and children's book author
- Known for: Children's Laureate 2022–2024
- Notable work: The Boy Lost in the Maze
- Partner: Manjeet Mann
- Awards: Carnegie Medal, 2024
- Website: thepoetryofjosephcoelho.com

Joseph Aaron Coelho OBE FRSL is a British poet and children's book author who was Children's Laureate from 2022 to 2024. In 2023, he was elected a Fellow of the Royal Society of Literature. In 2024, he was announced the winner of the Carnegie Medal for his YA novel The Boy Lost in the Maze.

== Personal life and education ==
Coelho grew up in a tower block in Roehampton, England, the son of a single parent. He became interested in poetry when Jean "Binta" Breeze visited his school whilst Coelho was in sixth form. He took A-Levels in Theatre Studies, English, Chemistry, History and an A/S in Archaeology. Coelho was an undergraduate student in archaeology at University College London (UCL). During his university days, he directed plays at UCL, after which he took various jobs, including working at Camden Council.

Coehlo lives in Edinburgh with his partner Manjeet Mann.

== Career ==
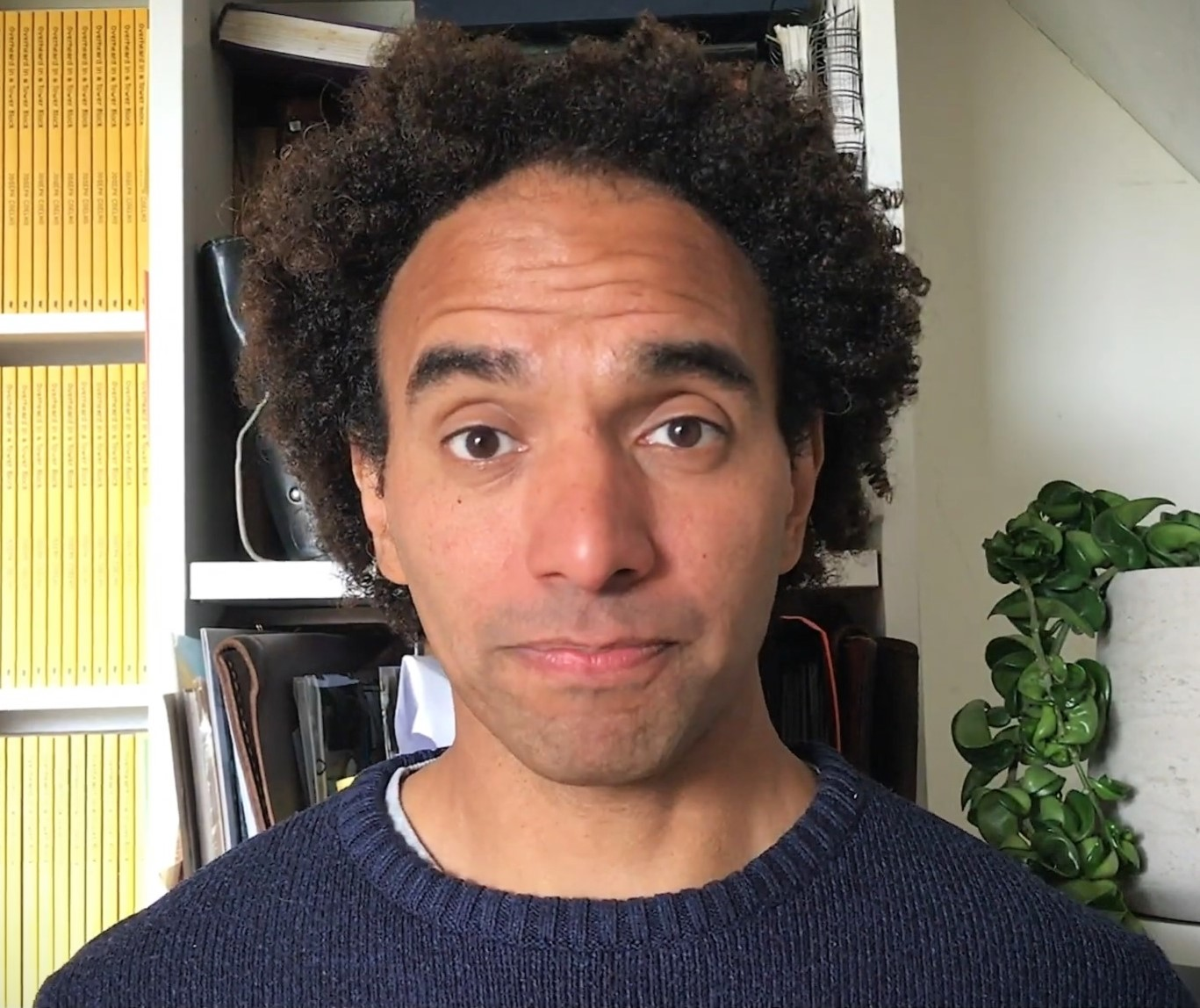
Coelho in 2020

Coelho started performing poetry with performance poetry organisation Apples and Snakes in 2002, performing on the London Poetry Scene. Coelho has a long history in theatre both on stage and behind the scenes, which began as a youth at Group 64 in Putney. After university, Coelho worked with many companies behind the scenes, including the Lyric Theatre Hammersmith, the Unicorn Theatre, Half Moon Theatre, Talawa Theatre Company, Oily Cart, and Theatre Centre.

Coelho is also a playwright and has written plays for the following companies:

- Wordpepper Theatre / Half Moon Theatre: Pop-Up Flashback and The PoetryJoe Show
- Polka Theatre: Goldilocks and the Three Bears, co-written with Jonathon Lloyd
- Half Moon Theatre: Fairytales Gone Bad: Grannylocks / The Monstrous Duckling
- Half Moon Theatre: Fairytales Gone Bad: Zombie-rella / Blood Red Hood
- Unicorn Theatre: Bye Bye Planet Earth
- Islington Community Theatre: Chicken Shop
- The Spark Children's Festival: Tree Child
- Pied Piper Theatre Company: Robin's Winter Adventure, co-written with Tina Williams
- The Little Angel Theatre: The Wishing Tree
- Tutti Frutti Productions: Jack Frost and The Search for Winter

Before being published, Coelho worked extensively in schools, engaging young people with literacy through the medium of poetry, running sessions through Performance Poetry Organisation Apples and Snakes, The Poetry Society, and Creative Partnerships. Coelho often runs CPD sessions with teachers, sharing ways to engage young people with poetry.

At the London Book Fair in 2012, Coelho met Janetta Otter-Barry, the founder of Otter-Barry books. This interaction launched Coelho's career as an author and published poet. In 2014 Coelho published Werewolf Club Rules, a poetry anthology which was awarded the Centre for Literacy in Primary Poetry Award. Coelho's second independent collection, Overheard in a Tower Block, was shortlisted for the Centre for Literacy in Primary Poetry Award in 2018.

Coelho has written numerous books for young people, spanning picture books, middle-grade and YA. His debut picture book Luna Loves Library Day, with Fiona Lumbers, was nominated for the 2018 Kate Greenaway Medal and chosen as one of the nation's top 25 stories to share by World Book Day UK.

Coelho's debut YA verse novel, The Girl Who Became a Tree, about a girl numbed by grief, was shortlisted for the CILIP Carnegie Medal and the CILIP Kate Greenaway Medal and received a Special Mention for the 2021 Bologna Ragazzi Poetry Award.

Coelho is a children's author and poet who is committed to making the reading and writing of poetry accessible to all. As part of these efforts, in 2018, he created resources for Key Stage 1 and Key Stage 2 students on understanding poetry. The resources included a series of videos explaining the different formats of poetry, how to perform poetry and how to interpret poetry.

In 2022, Coelho was appointed the Children's Laureate. He has said that poetry was often what people turned to in times of need, “because we instinctively know, deep down in our core, that poetry transcends”. He looks to improve diversity amongst the authors and illustrators on UK bookshelves. As part of his tenure as Children's Laureate, he focused on various different projects, Poetry Prompts, Bookmaker Like You and the Library Marathon. He launched Poetry Prompts, a set of online writing activities to inspire people to write their own poetry. Additionally, he started a programme called Bookmaker Like You, celebrating the authors, illustrators and publishers who underpin book creation. As part of the Library Marathon, Coelho visited a library in every local authority across the United Kingdom. He was succeeded as Children's Laureate in July 2024 by Frank Cottrell-Boyce.

His YA verse novel The Boy Lost in the Maze, which uses the legend of the Minotaur in a tale of a teenager searching for his biological father, was the winner of the 2024 Carnegie Medal for Writing and has received international acclaim, appearing on the White Raven Book list - Munich, The IBBY UK Honour Books List and was awarded The Extraordinary Book of 2023 by The International Children's Literature Festival of Berlin.

Coelho was appointed Officer of the Order of the British Empire (OBE) in the 2024 Birthday Honours for services to the Arts, to Children's Reading and to Literature.

Coelho was awarded the title of Honorary Doctor of Letters by the University of Roehampton in 2025. This recognition celebrates his significant contributions to literature and the arts.

== Publications ==
=== Picture books ===
- Luna Loves Library Day, with illustrator Fiona Lumbers (nominated for the 2018 Greenaway Medal)
- Luna Loves Art, with illustrator Fiona Lumbers
- Luna Loves Dance, with illustrator Fiona Lumbers
- Luna Loves World Book Day, with illustrator Fiona Lumbers
- The Hairdo That Got Away, with illustrator Fiona Lumbers
- If All The World Were…, with illustrator Allison Colpoys (winner of the Independent Bookshop Week Book Award 2019)
- My Beautiful Voice, with illustrator Allison Colpoys (winner of the Indie Book Awards 2022)
- No Longer Alone, with illustrator Robyn Wilson-Owen
- Our Tower, with illustrator Richard Johnson
- Thank You, with illustrator Sam Usher

=== Middle-Grade ===
- Fairy Tales Gone Bad - Zombierella, illustrated by Freya Hartas
- Fairy Tales Gone Bad - Frankenstiltskin, illustrated by Freya Hartas
- Fairy Tales Gone Bad - Creeping Beauty, illustrated by Freya Hartas
- Run, Friend, Run! Illustrated by Davide Ortu

=== Short-Stories ===
- "Hope Hunter", in The Book of Hopes, ed. Katherine Rundell
- "Amelia St-Claire and the Long Armed Killer", in Happy Here, introduced by Sharna Jackson
- “Underlay Underlings”, in Read Scream Repeat, curated by Jennifer Killick

=== Poetry ===
- Werewolf Club Rules, illustrated by John O'Leary
  - Winner of the CLPE CLIPPA Poetry Award 2015
- Overheard in a Tower Block, illustrated by Kate Milner
  - Long-listed for the 2018 Carnegie Medal
  - Shortlisted for the CLPE Poetry Award 2018
  - Long-listed for the 2019 UKLA Book Awards
- A Year of Nature Poems, Illustrated by Kelly Louise Judd
- Poems Aloud, illustrated by Daniel Gray-Barnett
- Smile Out Loud, illustrated by Daniel Gray-Barnett
- Blow a Kiss Catch a Kiss, illustrated by Nicola Killen
- How to Write Poems, illustrated by Matt Robertson

=== Young Adult ===
- The Girl Who Became a Tree
  - Shortlisted for the CILIP Carnegie Medal and the CILIP Kate Greenaway Medal
  - Special Mention for the 2021 Bologna Ragazzi Poetry Award
- The Boy Lost in the Maze, Illustrated by Kate Milner
  - Winner of the Carnegie Medal in 2024

Cultural offices
Preceded by Cressida Cowell	Children's Laureate of the United Kingdom; 2022–2024	Succeeded by Frank Cottrell-Boyce
