= I. W. Cornwall =

British archaeologist, academic and author (1909–1994)

Ian Wolfran Cornwall (28 November 1909 – 18 November 1994) was a British archaeologist, academic and author. After working for the United Kingdom in their censorship department from 1939 to 1945, Cornwall began working for the University of London as a secretary in 1948. Years later, Cornwall starting teaching archaeology at London in 1951 and continued to teach at the university until 1974. While at London, Cornwall was part of a 1954 skeletal excavation at Tell es-Sultan, Jericho. He also took part at excavations held at York and Knossos during the late 1950s. As an author, Cornwall wrote several books during the late 1950s to early 1970s. Of his works, The Making of Man received the 1961 Carnegie Medal.

== Early life and education ==
Cornwall was born in Coonoor, India on 28 November 1909.He was the son of Surgeon Lieutenant Colonel John Wolfran Cornwall of Indian Medical Service and Effie Esme Sinclair. After he attended school in Berkshire, England as a teenager, Cornwall went to St John's College, Cambridge and the University of London for his post-secondary studies between the 1930s to 1950s.

== Career ==
For his first job, Cornwall sold vacuum cleaners. Other jobs that Cornwall held during the 1930s included working as a teacher and making pharmaceutical drugs. From 1939 to 1945, Cornwall worked in the censorship department for the Ministry of Information. In 1948, Cornwall began his tenure at the archaeology department of London University. He started out as a secretary before beginning his teaching career in 1951. While at London, Cornwall became a reader in 1966 for their archaeology department. In 1974, Cornwall ended his tenure at London.

At London, Cornwall worked as an archaeologist during a 1954 excavation of partial human skeletons in Tell es-Sultan. At Tell es-Sultan, Cornwall sketched the overlapping bones found in each layer and identified which parts of the body they belonged to. In his 1956 paper, Cornwall theorised about the burial and exhumation practices that occurred with the Tell es-Sultan skeletons. Other excavation research that Cornwall took part in the late 1950s include sites in York and Knossos.

As a textbook author, Cornwall first published Bones for the Archaeologist in 1956 and its sequel Soils for the Archaeologist in 1958. During the 1960s, some of Cornwall's books included The World of Ancient Man in 1964 and Prehistoric Animals and their Hunters in 1968. For children, Cornwall first released The Making of Man in 1960 before the release of Hunters Half Moon in 1967. His final book was the 1970 publication Ice Ages: Their Nature and Effects. Of his children's works, The Making of Man received the Carnegie Medal in 1961.

== Death and personal life ==
Cornwall died on 18 November 1994. He was married twice and had two children.
