= Alan Marks =

English artist and illustrator

- Born: 1957 (age 68–69); London, England
- Occupations: Artist and illustrator

Alan Marks (London, 1957) is an English artist and illustrator.

Marks studied at the Medway College of Art and design from 1976 to 1977, and at the Bath Academy of Art from 1977 to 1980. He briefly taught at the Bath Academy and at Southampton Art College. Since then, he has worked in magazines before turning to illustrating children's books. He is praised for his "warm, attractive pictures," and for his use of watercolor. He has illustrated books for many children's authors, including Kevin Crossley-Holland and Jane Goodall.
