= Nick Podehl =

American voice actor

Nick Podehl is an American voice actor. He has narrated more than 250 audiobooks, for which he has received 14 Earphone Awards and 2 Odyssey Award honors.

== Biography ==
Podehl graduated from Grand Valley State University, where he studied Communications and Theatre. While at Grand Valley State University, he performed in multiple theatre productions.

He presently lives near Grand Rapids, Michigan with his wife and two daughters.

== Awards and honors ==
=== Awards ===
Year	Title	Author	Award	Result	Ref.
2010	Masters of Disaster (2010)	Gary Paulsen	Earphone Award	Winner	
2010	The Ask and the Answer (2009)	Patrick Ness	Earphone Award	Winner	
2010	The Knife of Never Letting Go (2008)	Patrick Ness	Earphone Award	Winner	
2010	Swim the Fly (2010)	Don Calame	Earphone Award	Winner	
2010	Zombies vs. Unicorns (2010)	Holly Black and Justine Larbalestier (eds.)	Earphone Award	Winner	
2011	Carter's Big Break (2010)	Brent Crawford	Earphone Award	Winner	
2011	The Knife of Never Letting Go (2008)	Patrick Ness	Amazing Audiobooks for Young Adults	Top 10	
2011	The Knife of Never Letting Go (2008)	Patrick Ness	Odyssey Award	Honor	
2011	Will Grayson, Will Grayson (2010)	John Green and David Levithan	Amazing Audiobooks for Young Adults	Top 10	
2011	Will Grayson, Will Grayson (2010)	John Green and David Levithan	Odyssey Award	Honor	
2011	The Wise Man's Fear (2011)	Patrick Rothfuss	Earphone Award	Winner	
2012	Carter's Big Break (2010)	Brent Crawford	Amazing Audiobooks for Young Adults	Top 10	
2012	October Mourning: A Song for Matthew Shepard (2012)	Lesléa Newman	Earphone Award	Winner	
2013	More Than This (2002)	Patrick Ness	Earphone Award	Winner	
2013	Personal Effects	E. M. Kokie	Amazing Audiobooks for Young Adults	Top 10	
2013	Wonder	R.J. Palacio	Amazing Audiobooks for Young Adults	Top 10	
2013	The Wonder of Aging: A New Approach to Embracing Life After Fifty (2013)	Michael Gurian	Earphone Award	Winner	
2013	Yesterday's Echo (2013)	Matt Coyle	Earphone Award	Winner	
2014	The Boundless (2014)	Kenneth Oppel	Earphone Award	Winner	
2014	The Curse of the Buttons (2014)	Anne Ylvisaker	Earphone Award	Winner	
2015	Fat Boy vs. the Cheerleaders	Geoff Herbach	Amazing Audiobooks for Young Adults	Top 10	
2016	The Consequence Of Seduction (2016)	Rachel Van Dyken	Earphone Award	Winner	
2017	The Brink: Stories	Austin Bunn	Audie Award for Short Stories or Collections	Winner	
2017	Forgiving My Daughter’s Killer	Kate Grosmaire and Nancy French	Audie Award for Faith-Based Fiction and Nonfiction	Finalist	

=== Honors ===
Year	Title	Author	Honor	Ref.
2010	The Killer's Cousin	Nancy Werlin	Amazing Audiobooks for Young Adults	
2010	Will Grayson, Will Grayson (2010)	John Green and David Levithan	Booklist Editors' Choice: Media	
2011	Beat the Band	Don Calame	Amazing Audiobooks for Young Adults	
2011	The Knife of Never Letting Go (2008)	Patrick Ness	Notable Children's Recordings	
2011	Seth Baumgartner’s Love Manifesto	Eric Luper	Amazing Audiobooks for Young Adults	
2011	Swim the Fly	Don Calame	Amazing Audiobooks for Young Adults	
2011	Will Grayson, Will Grayson (2010)	John Green and David Levithan	Notable Children's Recordings	
2012	The Ask and the Answer (2009)	Patrick Ness	Amazing Audiobooks for Young Adults	
2012	After Ever After	Jordan Sonnenblick	Amazing Audiobooks for Young Adults	
2012	Bruiser	Neal Shusterman	Amazing Audiobooks for Young Adults	
2012	Paintings from the Cave	Gary Paulsen	Amazing Audiobooks for Young Adults	
2012	Wonder	R.J. Palacio	Booklist Editors' Choice: Media	
2012	Zombies vs. Unicorns (2010)	Holly Black and Justine Larbalestier (eds.)	Amazing Audiobooks for Young Adults	
2013	Dancing Carl	Gary Paulsen	Amazing Audiobooks for Young Adults	
2013	Doll Bones	Holly Black	AudioFile Best Children's Titles	
2013	October Mourning: A Song for Matthew Shepard (2012)	Lesléa Newman	Amazing Audiobooks for Young Adults	
2013	Wonder	R.J. Palacio	Notable Children's Recordings	
2014	The Boundless (2014)	Kenneth Oppel	AudioFile Best Children's Titles	
2014	Crazy Dangerous	Andrew Klavan	Amazing Audiobooks for Young Adults	
2015	The Boundless (2014)	Kenneth Oppel	Notable Children's Recordings	
2015	The Liar's Wife (2014)	Mary Gordon	Booklist Editors' Choice: Audio for Adults	
2015	Sway	Kat Spears	Amazing Audiobooks for Young Adults	
2016	The Consequence Of Seduction (2016)	Rachel Van Dyken	AudioFile Best Romance Titles	
2018	Benjamin Franklin You’ve Got Mail by	Adam Mansbach and Alan Zweibel	Amazing Audiobooks for Young Adults	
2018	Who Killed Christopher Goodman?	Allan Wolf	Amazing Audiobooks for Young Adults	

== Filmography ==
Year	Title	Role
2007	Surviving Grandpop	John Thompson
2009	Already Happened	Johnny
2012	The 13th Warning	Narrator
2012	Three Faces of Me	Narrator
2018	How to Catch A Turkey	Narrator
