= An Almond for a Parrot =

2016 novel by Sally Gardner

- First edition
- Author: Sally Gardner (under pseudonym Wray Delaney)
- Language: English
- Genre: novel
- Publisher: HQ
- Publication date: 2016
- Publication place: United Kingdom
- Media type: Print
- Pages: 416
- ISBN: 0-00-818256-6

An Almond for a Parrot was published in 2016 by English author Sally Gardner (who writes children’s fiction) under the pseudonym Wray Delaney, this is an adult novel set in London in 1756, and has been described as an erotic fairytale. It takes its title from a tract by Elizabethan writer Thomas Nashe.

As remarked in The Guardian, "Historians estimate that one in five women worked as prostitutes in 18th‑century London. Delaney takes care to outline the abuse, assault, disease and abandonment that are also often the courtesan’s lot."

== Dedication ==
'For my mother, Nina Lowry.'

== Fleet Marriages ==
An explanation of the Fleet Marriages is highlighted in the foreword, where customs are observed in the Fleet Prison. A marriage ceremony is performed by 'disreputable and dissolute' clergymen (mostly in prisoners for debt) in eliciting a fee for the service without 'questions asked or stipulations made'. Such a marriage is part of the key to the novel itself.

== Plot ==
Initially set in Newgate Prison, pregnant Tully Truegood is charged with murder where she looks back on her life with her various incarnations as an orphan, whore and possibly murderer. Tully is able to see ghosts and more troubling is her ability for others to see them. Much of the story is set in a high-class brothel where Tully is groomed to be a successful courtesan.

== Reception ==
- Rowan Pelling writing in The Guardian is positive: "this is not a novel you read for its plot, so much as for its detours and set pieces, such as the resurrection of the dead during Tully’s trial... It’s a rococo affair, with Scheherazade-like diversions, much cross-dressing and rags-to-riches scenarios. The sex scenes are plentiful, unabashed and delivered in period parlance. Tully’s pleasure in her awakening body and ability to pleasure others is infectious. By the end of this novel you will have glimpsed more mounds and maypoles than on any village green, while Delaney’s portrait of gossipy, decadent coffee house London is a pleasure in itself."
- Ani Johnson in www.thebookbag.co.uk also praises the novel "Tully has a lot going on in her life and a shadow of great menace and danger lurking over it. She is growing while we watch, learning about human nature and her own background as much as, if not more than, her profession. Sally/Wray also provides a window on the plight of women and the politics tied up with the choice or necessity to go into prostitution. The residents of the Fairy House may have started out avoiding poverty but they come over as being in a very fortunate position compared to those out on the street or in a similar line of work but without the House's protection or scruples. Indeed, the ethos and realities within their world make fascinating reading. In some ways this book could be the literary love child of Sarah Waters and John Cleland (author of Fanny Hill) with the subtle fantasy dash of Karen Maitland yet it also feels fresh and original. This means that Wray Delaney has written a debut adult story that will generate discussing as well as entertainment, and that's not a bad thing at all."
- Katherine McLaughlin writing in SciFiNow is more restrained "it must be said that the ghosts almost feel like a secondary consideration. Though many appear, few stick in the memory aside from a young girl named Pretty Poppet whose tragic demise is truly upsetting. The manifestations become mildly repetitive as their yarns unfold and they lack a certain spookiness with the atmosphere feeling more mysterious than chilling. Towards the end, a cheap twist involving male homosexuality leaves an entirely icky residue, which is strange considering the lesbian arcs are so gracefully handled"
