= British Book Awards Children's Book of the Year =

British literary award

The British Book Awards Children's Book of the Year is a British literary award, given annually to works of children's literature as part of the British Book Awards (known as the Nibbies). It was established in 1996, replacing the British Illustrated Children's Book of the Year and British Children's Author of the Year categories.

It is currently sponsored by WHSmith, although it was previously sponsored by Red House (who also sponsor the Red House Children's Book Award). Formerly called the "British Children's Book Award", it was renamed to "Children's Book of the Year" in 2010.

== Winners ==
| Year | Author | Title | Publisher | Ref. |
|---|---|---|---|---|
| 1996 | Alison Sage ed. | The Hutchinson Treasury of Children's Literature | Hutchinson | |
| 1997 | Philip Pullman | Northern Lights | Scholastic | |
| 1998 | J. K. Rowling | Harry Potter and the Philosopher's Stone | Bloomsbury | |
| 1999 | J. K. Rowling | Harry Potter and the Chamber of Secrets | Bloomsbury | |
| 2000 | Jacqueline Wilson | The Illustrated Mum | Doubleday | |
| 2001 | Philip Pullman | The Amber Spyglass | Scholastic | |
| 2002 | Eoin Colfer | Artemis Fowl | Viking/Puffin | |
| 2003 | Jacqueline Wilson | Girls in Tears | Corgi Children's | |
| 2004 | Mark Haddon | The Curious Incident of the Dog in the Night-Time | David Fickling | |
| 2005 | Julia Donaldson and Axel Scheffler | The Gruffalo's Child | Macmillan Children's Books | |
| 2006 | Anthony Horowitz | Ark Angel | Walker Books | |
| 2007 | Ricky Gervais | Flanimals of the Deep | Faber & Faber | |
| 2008 | Francesca Simon | Horrid Henry and the Abominable Snowman | Orion Children's Books | |
| 2009 | Stephenie Meyer | Breaking Dawn | Little, Brown | |
| 2010 | Julia Donaldson and Axel Scheffler | Zog | Alison Green | |
| 2011 | Patrick Ness | A Monster Calls | Walker Books | |
| 2012 | David Walliams | Ratburger | HarperCollins | |
| 2013 | David Walliams | Demon Dentist | HarperCollins | |
| 2014 | David Walliams | Awful Auntie | HarperCollins | |
| 2015 | No award | | | |
| 2016 | No award | | | |

2017–present
| Year | Name | Title |
|---|---|---|
| 2017 | Kiran Millwood Hargrave | The Girl of Ink & Stars |
| 2018 | Robert Macfarlane and Jackie Morris | The Lost Words |
| 2018 | Angie Thomas | The Hate U Give |
| 2019 | WINNER RETRACTED | |
| 2020 | Holly Jackson | A Good Girl's Guide to Murder |

== Shortlists ==
=== 2006 ===
- Ark Angel by Anthony Horowitz (winner)
- I, Coriander by Sally Gardner
- SilverFin by Charlie Higson
- Eldest by Christopher Paolini
- ...and that's when it fell off in my hand by Louise Rennison
- Wizardology: The Book of the Secrets of Merlin by Dugald Steer

=== 2007 ===
- Flanimals of the Deep by Ricky Gervais (winner)
- The Boy in the Striped Pyjamas by John Boyne
- The Incredible Book Eating Boy by Oliver Jeffers
- Peter Pan in Scarlet by Geraldine McCaughrean
- Wintersmith by Terry Pratchett
- Horrid Henry and the Football Fiend by Francesca Simon (author) and Tony Ross (illustrator)

=== 2008 ===
- Horrid Henry and the Abominable Snowman by Francesca Simon (author) and Tony Ross (illustrator) (winner)
- That's Not My Penguin by Fiona Watte
- Katie Price's Perfect Ponies by Katie Price
- Born to Run by Michael Morpurgo
- Kiss by Jacqueline Wilson

== British Children's Author of the Year ==
The British Children's Author of the Year Award was given annually to authors of children's literature as part of the British Book Awards. It was established in 1990 and awarded for the last time in 1995. During the 1996 British Book Awards both it and the Illustrated Children's Book of the Year award were replaced by the Children's Book of the Year category.

=== Winners ===
| Year | Name |
|---|---|
| 1990 | Roald Dahl |
| 1991 | Anne Fine |
| 1992 | Dick King-Smith |
| 1993 | Raymond Briggs |
| 1994 | Anne Fine |
| 1995 | Janet and Allan Ahlberg |

== British Illustrated Children's Book of the Year ==
The British Illustrated Children's Book of the Year Award was given annually to illustrated works of children's literature as part of the British Book Awards. It was established in 1991 and awarded for the last time in 1995. For the 1996 British Book Awards both it and the Children's Author of the Year award were replaced by the Children's Book of the Year category.

=== Winners ===
| Year | Name | Title |
|---|---|---|
| 1991 | Nicola Bayley | The Mousehole Cat |
| 1992 | Martin Waddell (ill. Helen Oxenbury) | Farmer Duck |
| 1993 | Mick Inkpen | Penguin Small |
| 1994 | Babette Cole | Mummy Laid an Egg |
| 1995 | Jay Young | The Amazing Pop-Up Science Book |
