= David Prentiss =

David Prentiss may refer to:

- David Prentiss (Mayor/President), fictional character in the Chaos Walking trilogy
- Davy Prentiss, Jr., fictional character in the Chaos Walking trilogy
- David Prentiss (filmmaker), writer of Dr. Terror's Gallery of Horrors

== See also ==
- David Prentis, General Secretary of UNISON
- David Prentice (disambiguation)
