= I, Coriander =

2005 young adult novel by Sally Gardner

- First edition
- Author: Sally Gardner
- Illustrator: Lydia Corry
- Language: English
- Genre: Children's
- Publisher: Orion Children's Books
- Publication date: 4 August 2005
- Publication place: United Kingdom
- Pages: 320 pp
- ISBN: 978-1-84255-290-2
- OCLC: 59878419
- Dewey Decimal: 823.914 22
- LC Class: MLCS 2006/45011

I, Coriander is a 2005 young adult novel by Sally Gardner, a historical fantasy set in London at the time of the Puritan Commonwealth. The novel traces the time period of the beheading of Charles the 1st through the Restoration of Charles the 2nd. It won the Nestlé Children's Book Prize Gold Award. It was also shortlisted for the British Children's Book of the Year and the Stockton Children's Book of the Year, as well as longlisted for the Carnegie Medal.

== Plot summary ==
The novel tells the story of a seventeenth-century girl named Coriander. Coriander Hobie is born the daughter of a wealthy merchant living on the Thames a few years before the English Civil War. The Novel is told in her voice of what she remembers of her early childhood. She pays little attention to the political intrigue around her, only to her mother's special medicines she gives to the neighbours, and to the fairy stories her mother tells her in her room full of murals of golden creatures. She is happy until she receives a present of silver shoes which her mother forbids her to wear and stores above a wardrobe with a stuffed alligator which scares Coriander into leaving it alone for sometime. True to any mischievous child's antics, Coriander slips on the pair of silver shoes. The first time she wears them she experiences hallucinations and disappears on a bridge with the family servant only to reappear shaken minutes later. Her mother insists that the shoes be put out of her reach, though Coriander begs for them back. On Coriander's ninth birthday her mother gives in and lets Coriander have the shoes. Shortly after, an evil raven flies into their house and though Coriander does not understand why, shortly thereafter her mother dies. While her father grieves it is hinted at that her mother may not have been from the human world, and possessed a magical fairy relic that might have saved her life. He hides this relic beside the stuffed alligator where Coriander's shoes were once kept.

The neighbours start talking as the wheels of the world continue to turn and Coriander's father is branded a Royalist and his late wife a witch so to avoid scrutiny falling on Coriander, he remarries. The woman he chooses is a rotund devout Puritan woman named Maud Leggs who immediately begins to change Coriander's life. Though her stepmother brings the child of her previous marriage, Hester, who dearly loves Coriander, it is not enough to make up for Maud's cruel treatment of Coriander. Coriander's father is away longer and longer on business as Cromwell comes to power and a warrant is put out for his arrest. To escape the Roundheads, he flees to France and she is left with her stepmother and stepsister. Without Coriander's father there to protect her and the household, Maud takes total control and sells all their nice furniture, scrubs all the paintings from Coriander's room and invites a cruel Puritan Preacher to live with them. The preacher and Maud continue to abuse Coriander and tell her she must take on a more Christian name, Ann. They beat her whenever she refuses to use the name. They soon dismiss Coriander's favourite servant who, apart from Hester, had been her only remaining friend. After Coriander hides a doll in the cupboard, her stepmother is furious with her and cuts her hair. The preacher (Arise Fell) and Maud unleash their fury and lock Coriander in a red chest in the hopes that she will suffocate.

Coriander is instead transported to the Fairies' world where she is helped along by an old man (Medlar) who claims to have known her parents. Coriander travels in the Fairy world as a little blue light invisible to all others but the old man who shows her that her mother was really the Fairy Princess, daughter of the Fairy King. Before her mother fled the Fairy world for the human world, her father remarried a dark fairy who became Queen Rosemore and sought to steal her mother's fairy shadow, her source of her power. Now Rosemore schemes for her daughter to marry a fairy prince, Tycho, who wants nothing to do with her. Coriander inadvertently meets Tycho and tells him to resist Rosemore and fight back, despite the threat that Rosemore will turn him into a fox and have giants hunt him if he refuses.

All too soon for Coriander's taste she wakes up from Fairy World in the chest in her father's house to find the police and a once sympathetic neighbour coming to find what they think will be her bones. In the human world years had passed, though Coriander felt she was only gone for a little more than a day. Coriander is liberated from the house and now lives with the neighbour, a kind tailor and his apprentice who is in love with Hester, but they were unable to save Hester at the time. Coriander barely has time to adjust to the new world she has woken up in a teenage body much bigger and different than the one she was used to, and she is afraid for Tycho, with whom she has fallen in love, when the tailor's apprentice warns her that Maud and the preacher are on the verge of killing Hester as they once tried to do to Coriander.

Coriander disguises herself as a boy and breaks into her own home with the tailor's apprentice to rescue Hester, only to overhear the Queen Rosemore meeting with the preacher and Maud, angry that Coriander is not dead yet and her mother's shadow is not hers. They escape with Hester but Coriander resolves to go back for her shadow.

Once Hester recovers somewhat, Coriander agrees to write down her story as Hester cannot read or write and in much the same way that Coriander is writing her own story of the book, she writes Hester's account of her miserable childhood.

Coriander decides she will not let Rosemore win, and must go back to the house to claim her mother's shadow that was rightfully hers. She returns to the house in her disguise and finds that the stuffed alligator has come to life with her mother's magic and is guarding the shadow from the preacher and Maud. Coriander is able to approach the alligator without fear and when she takes her mother's shadow she is transported to the fairy world again. She is there in the dead of winter now, and Tycho has become a fox, still on the run from the giants for refusing to marry Rosemore's daughter. Coriander finds him, impaled with arrows and spends the night in a barn crying over his body. When morning comes she awakes to find the fox gone, but Tycho has been restored as a human for the day, albeit shaggy and bedraggled as he will once again become a fox.

Coriander faces Rosmore and does not give up the shadow. Tycho becomes fully human again and confesses his love to Coriander and invites her to stay with him in his kingdom. She loves him but she refuses as she feels it is her duty to return to her father. In the human world a year has passed and Hester has a child. Edmund Bedwell proposes to Coriander but she refuses as she is still in love with Tycho and is miserable without him. One day when she goes out for a walk she sees him and rushes into his arms.
