= Maggot Moon =

2012 young adult novel by Sally Gardner

- Author: Sally Gardner
- Illustrator: Julian Crouch
- Genre: Young adult fiction, dystopian fiction
- Publisher: Candlewick Press
- Publication date: February 12, 2013
- Media type: Print (hardcover, paperback)
- Awards: Carnegie Medal; Costa Book Award for Children's book
- ISBN: 9780763665531

Maggot Moon is a young adult novel written by Sally Gardner, illustrated by Julian Crouch, and published February 12, 2013 by Candlewick Press. The book takes place in an alternate timeline of 1956 as the characters live in "The Motherland," telling a tale of what could have happened had the Nazis won the Second World War.

In 2013, the book won the Carnegie Medal.

== Reception ==
Maggot Moon received starred reviews from Publishers Weekly, The Horn Book, and Booklist, as well as positive reviews from The School Librarian, The Bulletin of the Center for Children's Books, and School Library Journal.

Publishers Weekly wrote, "Parts of the story are very hard to read—early on, a classmate is beaten to death by a teacher in the schoolyard—but the violence asks readers to consider what the world would be like if certain events in history had turned out differently." They continue the review, noting that "Gardner does a masterful job of portraying Standish’s dyslexia through the linguistic swerves of his narration, and although the ending is pure heartbreak, she leaves readers with a hopeful message about the power of one boy to stand up to evil."

Writing for The Horn Book, Deirdre Baker noted that the "tale has the terse, energetic tension of poetry" and the main characters' "phrases and sentences roll out with irony, tenderness, horror, or love, but always vividly."

Margaret Pemberton, writing for The School Librarian, stated, "This is one of those ‘Wow’ books that come along now and then," noting that Gardner has written a "true classic."

Kirkus reviewed the book poorly, explaining, "Despite short chapters and simple vocabulary and syntax, the detailed, sadistic violence makes this is a poor choice for younger readers, while oversimplified characters, a feeble setting and inauthentic science make it a tough sell for older ones." They finished the review by saying, "Despite intentions, this tale never connects past to present, resulting in a book with a message but no resonance."

Beyond popular media, Maggot Moon has been discussed in academic journals for its multimodality.

Awards for Maggot Moon
| Year | Award | Result | Ref. |
|---|---|---|---|
| 2012 | Costa Book Award for Children's Book | Winner | |
| 2013 | Carnegie Medal | Winner | |
| 2014 | Michael L. Printz Award | Honor | |
| 2014 | American Library Association's Amazing Audiobooks for Young Adults | Selection | |

Awards
| Preceded by A Monster Calls | Carnegie Medal recipient 2013 | Succeeded by The Bunker Diary |
