= Chaos Walking (film) =

2021 film by Doug Liman

- Theatrical release poster
- Directed by: Doug Liman
- Screenplay by: Patrick Ness; Christopher Ford
- Based on: The Knife of Never Letting Go by Patrick Ness
- Produced by: Doug Davison; Allison Shearmur; Erwin Stoff; Alison Winter
- Starring: Daisy Ridley; Tom Holland; Mads Mikkelsen; Demián Bichir; Cynthia Erivo; Nick Jonas; David Oyelowo
- Cinematography: Ben Seresin
- Edited by: Doc Crotzer
- Music by: Marco Beltrami; Brandon Roberts
- Production companies: TIK Films; Quadrant Pictures; Allison Shearmur Productions; 3 Arts Entertainment; Hercules Film Fund; Bron Creative
- Distributed by: Lionsgate
- Release dates: February 24, 2021 (South Korea); March 5, 2021 (United States)
- Running time: 109 minutes
- Country: United States
- Language: English
- Budget: $100–125 million
- Box office: $27 million

Chaos Walking is a 2021 American dystopian science-fiction action-thriller film directed by Doug Liman and written by Patrick Ness and Christopher Ford. It is based on Ness's science fiction trilogy Chaos Walking, adapting its first book, 2008's The Knife of Never Letting Go. It stars Daisy Ridley, Tom Holland, Mads Mikkelsen, Demián Bichir, Cynthia Erivo, Nick Jonas and David Oyelowo. It follows a young man who lives in a dystopian world without women, where all living creatures can hear each other's thoughts in streams of images, words, and sounds, called "Noise". When a woman crash-lands on the planet, he protects her from danger.

Announced in 2011, the film underwent several rewrites based on an initial draft by Charlie Kaufman, with Jamie Linden, John Lee Hancock, Gary Spinelli, Lindsey Beer, Ford and Ness revising it further. Liman was later announced as director in 2016, and principal photography began in 2017. Originally set to release on March 1, 2019, it was removed from the schedule to accommodate the film's reshoots in April 2019 after poor test screenings.

The film premiered in South Korea on February 24, 2021, and in the United States on March 5, 2021. It received generally negative reviews from critics who derided the lack of character development and overall execution. The film was also labeled a box office bomb, grossing $27.1 million worldwide against a $100‒125 million budget, resulting in a massive write-down for Lionsgate.

== Plot ==
In 2257 AD, on the colony planet New World, the male colonists have been afflicted with the Noise, a condition which causes everyone to see and hear each other's thoughts. The colonists were at war with the native humanoid species referred to as The Spackle, which killed the female colonists, while half the men survived.

Todd Hewitt lives in Prentisstown with his adoptive fathers, Ben Moore and Cillian Boyd. Other residents include the preacher Aaron, the town's mayor David Prentiss, and his son Davy. Prentiss (David) has learned to control his Noise, making his thoughts difficult to see and hear.

A spaceship that lost contact with the First Colony approaches New World and a scout ship is sent to investigate the planet, but crashes. Todd discovers someone stealing and chases the thief, only to come upon the crash site.

Returning to town, Todd tries to keep quiet, but the others hear and see his thoughts about the crashed ship. They head to investigate the crash scene but find no survivors. Todd eventually meets Viola, the ship's only survivor, and is shocked to see a girl, as he has never seen one before.

The men from Prentisstown capture Viola and bring her to the mayor, who questions her. Prentiss leaves to speak to the men and leaves Davy in charge of watching her. Davy toys with one of Viola's gadgets, which inadvertently shoots holes in the walls, allowing Viola to escape.

As she does, Viola overhears Prentiss talking about preventing her from contacting the colony's mothership, intercepting their landing, killing them while they are still under cryosleep, and scavenging the ship.

Viola hides in Todd's family's barn, where Todd finds her. He tries to keep her hidden when one of Prentiss's men arrives looking for her. Ben tells Todd about Farbranch, a settlement where Viola might be safe.

Viola escapes, with Todd following. Prentiss and the men arrive at the farm, demanding her back, claiming she is a spy. Davy kills Cillian, and Ben is forced to join them.

Meanwhile, Todd catches up to Viola and they travel to Farbranch, accompanied by Todd's dog Manchee. En route, she reveals she is from a Colony Ship carrying over four thousand passengers and her parents were too ill for the journey from Earth to New World.

When they encounter a Spackle, Todd attempts to kill it, but Viola stops him as it does not appear to be dangerous. They arrive at Farbranch, a town inhabited by men, women, and children, some of whom are displeased with Todd's presence, as he is from Prentisstown.

Todd has his mother's diary, which Viola reads to him as he is illiterate. It reveals that the women were not killed by the Spackle, but rather by the Prentisstown men. They could not stand not knowing the thoughts of the women who could hear theirs, which drove them crazy.

Prentiss and his men arrive. Ben tries to get Todd to surrender Viola, but he is upset with him for lying. Ben uses his Noise to distract Prentiss and his men with an image of Viola, while Todd and Viola escape. Aaron chases after them. They come upon a boat, but as they escape, Aaron drowns Manchee.

The next day, Viola and Todd arrive at the ruins of the first colony ship. There, they try to send a signal to her colony ship, but the antenna is damaged, so he attempts to repair it. When Prentiss and his men arrive, Todd surrenders, as he is holding Ben hostage. Aaron attempts to kill Viola, who immolates him with one of her gadgets.

Todd appears, but Prentiss shoots Ben. He goes to him and Ben slips him a knife. Todd engages Prentiss, who uses illusions of himself to distract Todd and shoots him. Before he can finish him off, Todd uses illusions of his mother and other women, calling Prentiss a coward. Viola pushes Prentiss off the cliff to his death.

The colony ship appears in the sky, causing Davy and the remaining Prentisstown men to flee. Todd wakes up in the colony ship's medical room. Viola says she has learned to love his planet and shows him the new colonies her people are building. When they are standing close together, Todd wonders if she's going to kiss him; she smiles and walks away.

== Cast ==
- Daisy Ridley as Viola Eade
- Tom Holland as Todd Hewitt
- Mads Mikkelsen as Mayor David Prentiss
- Demián Bichir as Ben Moore
- Cynthia Erivo as Mathilde 'Hildy'
- Nick Jonas as David 'Davy' Prentiss, Jr.
- Ray McKinnon as Matthew Lyle
- Kurt Sutter as Cillian Boyd
- David Oyelowo as Aaron
- Bethany Anne Lind as Karyssa Hewitt
- Camren Bicondova as Lola Eade

Additionally, dog actors Wiston and Lamborghini both portray Manchee the Dog. Óscar Jaenada was cast as Wilf, but all of his scenes were eventually cut from the film. Harrison Osterfield also makes an uncredited appearance as a man from Farbranch.

== Production ==
=== Development and casting ===
In October 2011, Lionsgate acquired worldwide distribution rights for a film adaptation of Patrick Ness's Chaos Walking trilogy, to be produced by Doug Davison's production company Quadrant Pictures. In 2012, Lionsgate hired Charlie Kaufman to write the first draft of the screenplay. Kaufman subsequently left, a fact he himself confirmed during a Q&A panel at the 2016 Karlovy Vary International Film Festival. His draft was later revised by Jamie Linden, Lindsey Beer, Gary Spinelli, John Lee Hancock, Christopher Ford and Ness himself. Deadline reported in 2013 that Robert Zemeckis was being considered as director, but this did not eventuate. By June 10, 2016, Doug Liman was in talks to direct the film. On August 4, 2016, it was reported that Daisy Ridley had joined the cast. She was a fan of the books, and it was announced she would play Viola. On November 28, 2016, Tom Holland joined the cast to play Todd.

On July 20, 2017, it was announced that Mads Mikkelsen had joined the cast for the film, as the villainous mayor. Demián Bichir, Kurt Sutter, Nick Jonas and David Oyelowo joined the cast in August 2017. Cynthia Erivo joined in September 2017. In October 2017, Óscar Jaenada joined the cast.

=== Filming ===
Principal photography began in Saint-Paulin, Quebec (Le Baluchon Eco-resort) and Montreal, Quebec on August 7, 2017, with additional financing from Bron Creative. Filming also took place in Scotland and Iceland. Principal photography wrapped up in November 2017.

In April 2018, it was reported that several weeks of reshoots were scheduled for late 2018 or early 2019, following poor test screenings. Owing to Ridley's filming commitments to Star Wars: The Rise of Skywalker and Holland's to Spider-Man: Far From Home, the reshoots could not begin until April 2019, with Fede Álvarez directing. The reshoots took place in Atlanta and lasted through May, adding an additional $15 million to the film's budget and bringing the total cost to $100 million. In September 2020, Ness and Ford were given final credit for the screenplay.

== Release ==
=== Theatrical ===
The film premiered in the United States on March 5, 2021, with an additional IMAX release, following a debut theatrical release in South Korea on February 24, 2021. It was previously scheduled to be released on March 1, 2019, but it was delayed to accommodate the film's reshoots. It was then scheduled to be released on January 22, 2021, but was delayed again to March due to the COVID-19 pandemic.

=== Home media ===
A month after the film's theatrical release in North America, it was released on PVOD on April 2, 2021, in both the United States and the United Kingdom, where theaters were closed due to lockdown in response to COVID-19 surges. It streamed on Hulu on August 27, 2021, and its Blu-ray copies were released on May 25, 2021, featuring 45 minutes of deleted scenes.

== Reception ==
=== Box office ===
The film grossed $13.3 million in the United States and Canada, and $13.8 million in other territories, for a worldwide total of $27.1 million, against a production budget of $100 million.

In North America, it was released alongside Raya and the Last Dragon and Boogie, and made $1.3 million from 1,980 theaters on its first day of release. It went on to debut to $3.7 million, finishing third at the box office. Deadline Hollywood wrote that the film was "poised to lose money" for Lionsgate, and Lionsgate "has already written off the pic's loss." The film made $2.3 million (–40%) in its second weekend, remaining in third. After its third weekend, where it grossed $1.2 million, Variety said that the film would "result in a massive write-down for the studio."

In South Korea, the film grossed $503,140 in its opening weekend, finishing fifth at the box office.

=== Critical response ===
Early reviews for the film criticized it for "poor execution and conventional, underdeveloped characters." Review aggregator website Rotten Tomatoes reports that 21% of 153 critics have given the film a positive review, with an average rating of 4.5/10. The site's critics consensus reads: "Chaos Walking sets out on a potentially interesting path, but this dystopian adventure badly bungles its premise and limps toward the finish." According to Metacritic, which calculated a weighted average score of 38 out of 100 based on 32 critics, the film received "generally unfavorable" reviews. Audiences polled by CinemaScore gave the film an average grade of "B" on an A+ to F scale, while PostTrak reported 70% of audience members gave it a positive score, with 43% saying they would definitely recommend it.

Writing for IndieWire, David Ehrlich gave the film a grade of C− and said, "Despite its strange conceit and a few buried hints as to what a more courageous film might have done with it, the movie version of the first Chaos Walking book (published as The Knife of Never Letting Go) is such a dull and ordinary thing that it can't help but get engulfed by the shadow of its own missed potential." Peter Debruge of Variety said that the film "quickly wears out its welcome", and wrote: "When it comes to confrontations, the movie wimps out, putting more effort into New World-building than in the largely generic characters who populate it."
