= Monsters of Men =

2010 novel by Patrick Ness

- Front cover of first edition
- Author: Patrick Ness
- Language: English
- Series: Chaos Walking #3
- Genre: Young-adult, science fiction
- Publisher: Walker Books (UK); Candlewick Press (US)
- Publication date: 3 May 2010; 28 September 2010 (US)
- Publication place: UK
- Media type: Print (hardcover & trade paper), audio CD
- Pages: 602 (first edition)
- ISBN: 978-1-4063-1027-6
- OCLC: 501398023
- LC Class: PZ7.N43843 Mon 2010
- Preceded by: The Ask and the Answer

Monsters of Men is a young adult science fiction novel by Patrick Ness, published by Walker Books in May 2010. It is the third book of the Chaos Walking trilogy inaugurated two years earlier by The Knife of Never Letting Go. Walker's U.S. division Candlewick Press published hardcover and audiobook editions within the calendar year.

Ness won the annual Carnegie Medal from CILIP, recognising the year's best new book for children or young adults published in the U.K.

The title is taken from previous dialogue in the series; "War makes monsters of men" is said in Knife, which both Todd and Viola later quote.

== Plot summary ==
An army of Spackle marches on New Prentisstown from one direction, and the forces of The Answer from the other. Mayor Prentiss has been freed by Todd to help defend the city, while Viola attempts to warn incoming settlers.

Prentiss' army and the Spackle's engage in combat. Viola and Mistress Coyle confer with Bradley and Simone, the scout ship pilots; Coyle wants to use the ship's missiles to destroy Prentiss. Prentiss' army pushes the Spackle army back into the forest. 1017, now named "The Return", has made his way to the Spackle camp. He is the only surviving slave and seeks revenge on Todd and the settlers.

The Spackle dam off the river to block the water supply and attack Prentiss' camp. Coyle attempts to manipulate Viola to use the scout ship, and when Todd is in danger, she launches a missile that kills most Spackle warriors. The Return argues with The Sky, the leader of the Spackle, demanding more attacks. The Sky refuses but reveals a captured, hibernating Ben, Todd's adoptive father. The Sky promises Ben to The Return if the two armies reach peace. The Spackle begin attacking the town at random. During a raid, Todd knocks Prentiss unconscious and takes over. Prentiss praises him for having such ability.

Prentiss' army without water, and The Answer without food, are forced into a peace talk. The two groups work together – Prentiss lures Spackle and The Answer provides bombs. Angry that Prentiss undermines her, Coyle sends a bomb into the Spackle stronghold. The Spackle respond with a message to send two people to meet the next morning.

Viola and Bradley are sent to negotiate with the Spackle. The Return attempts to murder Viola in revenge, but stops when he sees the ID band on her arm, sympathising. Although the peace talks are successful, the Spackle launch a surprise attack on Prentiss and Todd the next day. Prentiss, planning ahead, had already set up his artillery and soldiers. After killing the attacking Spackle, The Sky surrenders. The Return goes to kill Ben, angered by both the surrender and his inability to kill Viola. The Sky meets him there, and watches as The Return fails to murder Ben. Ben wakes.

During a speech, Mistress Coyle reveals a suicide bomb, intent on killing Prentiss. Todd inadvertently saves him. Later, Ben and The Return arrive. Todd, overwhelmed by happiness, rejoins Ben and leaves Prentiss' side. The settlers plan to settle peace, leaving Todd and Prentiss alone. Angered by Todd's decision to leave his side, Prentiss captures him and steals the scout ship. Prentiss launches flammable fuel at the forest, killing many Spackle, including The Sky who passes leadership to The Return.

Prentiss lands at the ocean and ties up Todd in a nearby church, while Viola rides in hopes of rescuing him. Prentiss is being driven mad by all of New World's Noise, a side-effect of his experiments. Todd escapes and they Noise-fight by the ocean. Viola arrives and helps overpower Prentiss. Todd begins to force Prentiss into the ocean. Prentiss, realizing his immorality, walks into the waters himself and dies.

The Return arrives and mistakes Todd for Prentiss, shooting him in the chest. Todd dies, driving Viola to threaten shooting The Return. The Return accepts his death, but Ben then swears he can hear Todd's Noise return.

The Spackle attempt to cure Todd with their medicine. The Return apologizes but Viola does not forgive, and continues to read Todd's mother's journal to him, hoping he will hear and come back. While in the coma, Todd enters his old memories – at his school, at Farbranch - but also human and Spackle memories from all over New World. He searches for Viola, unsure who she is, where she is. Every now and then, he hears extracts from the diary and begs Viola to keep calling for him.

== Reception ==
Critical reception has been largely positive. The Bookseller said the novel was "breathtaking" and noted that it was "innovative, intense writing at its incendiary best". 3:AM Magazine praised Ness, compared him to Philip Pullman, Robert Cormier, and Paul Zindel, and called the series "too good for the Young Adult strapline."

Beside winning the 2011 Carnegie Medal, Monsters of Men made the Arthur C. Clarke Award shortlist.

== See also ==
Awards
| Preceded by The Graveyard Book | Carnegie Medal recipient 2011 | Succeeded by A Monster Calls |
