= Sally Gardner =

British children's writer and illustrator

Sally Gardner is a British children's literature writer and illustrator. She won both the Costa Book Award for Children's Book and the Carnegie Medal for Maggot Moon (Hot Key Books, 2012). Under her pseudonym Wray Delaney she has also written adult novels.

== Life ==
Sally Gardner is the daughter of two lawyers. She was raised in Birmingham; her parents separated and later divorced when she was five. Her mother, Nina Lowry, was a barrister and judge at the Old Bailey.

Gardner recalls being badly bullied in school, even being nicknamed 'Silly Sally' on account of her then undiagnosed dyslexia. She was formally diagnosed with severe dyslexia at 12 and didn't learn to read until she was 14, with the first book she read in full being Wuthering Heights. Noticed by teachers for her creative flair, she did very well in art college and then in drama college, and worked as a theatre set designer before turning to illustration and writing. She lives in London. In 2019 Sally became an Ambassador for audiobook charity Listening Books.

She has stated she developed a shopping addiction after taking dopamine agonist drugs prescribed for her restless legs syndrome.

Gardner was elected a Fellow of the Royal Society of Literature (FRSL) in 2025.

== Writer ==
Her first book as a writer was published by Orion Books in 1993: The Little Nut Tree, a children's picture book that she also illustrated. Her first full-length novel was a breakthrough, as I, Coriander won the Nestlé Smarties Book Prize in 2005 (reader category 9–11 years). It is set in Cromwellian London and tells the story of Coriander, the unhappy daughter of a silk merchant.

The Red Necklace: A story of the French Revolution and its sequel The Silver Blade are set primarily in France during the Revolution and the Reign of Terror, also in contemporary London. They feature an aristocratic girl and a gypsy boy who are 12 and 14 years old when the story opens. The boy Yann has been trained to assist a stage magician but has or develops genuine magic powers; a starred review (unusually good) by the American service Kirkus Reviews labels even The Red Necklace fantasy.

The Double Shadow is historical fantasy that opens in 1937 Britain. Tinder (2013) is a historical novel set during the Thirty Years' War.

Maggot Moon (2012) won the Carnegie Medal from the CILIP, which annually recognises the best new book for children or young adults published in the UK. The alternate history is set in 1950s England during the space race, under the thumb of the so-called Motherland. Kirkus says the unnamed "Motherland's distinguishing features scream "Nazi Germany"" and suggests that we "call it Auschwitz lite". Its reviewer judged that the book must fail between younger and older readers: on the one hand, "short chapters and simple vocabulary and syntax ... oversimplified characters, a feeble setting and inauthentic science"; on the other hand, brutal content. Three months later it was recommended for ages 11+ by the panel of British librarians that named it to the Carnegie Medal shortlist with the comment: "A stunning book with an underdog hero, Maggot Moon offers a powerful depiction of an utterly convincing and frightening dystopia. With clever plotting, conspiracy theory and a truly original concept at the heart of it, this is a real tour de force without a hint of sentimentality." The inspiration for Maggot Moon comes from Moon landing conspiracies and her research on "what if histories".

In 2016 she wrote her first adult novel, entitled An Almond for a Parrot, which The Guardian called 'an irresistible erotic fairytale'.

== Children's books ==
=== As writer and illustrator ===
- The Little Nut Tree (Orion Books, 1993)
- My Little Princess (1994)
- A Book of Princesses (Orion, 1997) – classic fairy tales retold †
- The Strongest Girl in the World (1999) ‡
- The Fairy Catalogue: everything you need to make a fairy tale (2000)
- The Smallest Girl Ever (2000) ‡
- The Boy Who Could Fly (2001) ‡
- The Glass Heart: a tale of three princesses (2001)
- Mama, Don't Go Out Tonight (2002)
- The Invisible Boy (2002) ‡
- Boolar's Big Day Out (2003)
- Fairy Shopping (2003)
- The Boy with the Magic Numbers (2003)
- The Countess's Calamity (2003)
- I, Coriander (2005)
- A Hoof in the Door (2005)
- The Boy with the Lightning Feet (2006)
- The Red Necklace (2007)

(†) Five classic fairy tales retold and illustrated by Gardner in A Book of Princesses (1997) were reissued by Orion in 2011, singly, as the Magical Princesses series: Cinderella; The Frog Prince; The Princess and the Pea; Sleeping Beauty; Snow White.

(‡) The Magical Children series, originally published by Dolphin Paperbacks, comprises "stories about ordinary children who suddenly develop magical powers". OCLC 69020874

=== As writer only ===
- I, Coriander (2005)
- Lucy Willow (2006)
- The Red Necklace: A Story of the French Revolution (2007)
- The Silver Blade (2008) (sequel to The Red Necklace)
- The Double Shadow (2011)
- Maggot Moon (2012), illus. Julian Crouch
- Tinder (2013), illus. David Roberts
- The Door That Led to Where (2015)
- My Side of the Diamond (2017), illus. Nat Barlex
- The Snow Song (2020)

Wings & Co: The Fairy Detective Agency
illustrated by David Roberts and published by Orion
- Operation Bunny (2012)
- Three Pickled Herrings (2012)
- The Vanishing of Billy Buckle (2013)
- The Matchbox Mysteries (2014)
- The Flying Carpet Thief (2017)
- Murder of Mrs Mop (forthcoming)

=== As illustrator only ===
- Robert and the Giant (Hamish Hamilton, 1990), by Marjorie Newman
- Suzi, Sam, George & Alice (1993), Beverley Birch
- Playtime Rhymes (1995)
- Gynormous!: The Ultimate Book of Giants (1996), Adrian Mitchell
- Hello? Is Anybody There? (1997), Jostein Gaarder, 144 pp. – orig. Hallo? Er det noen her? (in Norwegian), 1996 OCLC 222263518
- The Real Fairy Storybook (1998), Georgie Adams
- Polly's Running Away Book (2000), Frances Thomas
- Polly's Absolutely Worst Birthday Ever (2001), Thomas
- Polly's Really Secret Diary (2002), Thomas

== Adult novels under pseudonym of Wray Delaney ==
- An Almond for a Parrot (2016)
- The Beauty of the Wolf (2019)

== Awards and nominations ==
- 2003 The Countess's Calamity, Nestlé Children's Book Prize bronze runner-up and Kids' Club Award winner, ages 6–8 years
- 2005 I, Coriander, winner Nestlé Children's Book Prize, ages 9–11 years
- 2006 I, Coriander, shortlisted for the National Book Awards, Children's Book of the Year
- 2007 I, Coriander, shortlisted for the Stockton Children's Book of the Year
- 2012 Maggot Moon, Costa Book Awards, Children's Book
- 2013 Maggot Moon, Carnegie Medal
