= The Red Necklace =

Book by Sally Gardner

- First edition, 2007
- Author: Sally Gardner
- Cover artist: Lydia Corry (portrait of boy)
- Series: French Revolution
- Genre: Young-adult historical novel
- Publisher: Orion Children's Books
- Publication date: 4 October 2007
- Publication place: United Kingdom
- Media type: Print (hardcover)
- Pages: viii + 376 pp
- ISBN: 1-84255-574-X
- OCLC: 148313489
- LC Class: PZ7.G179335 Red 2008
- Followed by: The Silver Blade

The Red Necklace is a young adult historical novel by Sally Gardner, published by Orion in 2007. It is a story of the French Revolution, interwoven with Roma magic. The audiobook is narrated by Tom Hiddleston.

The Silver Blade (Orion, 2008) is a sequel set during the Reign of Terror. US editions were published by Dial Press in 2008 and 2009.

== Plot ==
The story is principally set in and near Paris between 1789 and 1792. Yannick "Yann" Margoza, an orphaned Romani boy, who can throw his voice, read minds and predict the future, works in the Théâtre du Temple, with his guardians Topolain, a magician, and Têtu, a little person, who can move objects with his mind.

The trio is invited by the mysterious and sinister Count Kalliovski to perform at the chateau of the Marquis de Villeduval for him and his guests. Unbeknownst to them, Count Kalliovski is an old enemy from Têtu and Topolain's past. They run into him in the library of the chateau but it is too late for them to escape, so they decided to leave the bullet catch out of the performance. During one trick with the pierrot, Yann has a disturbing premonition in which the guests are all carrying their bloodied severed heads. Têtu and Topolain hurriedly try to end the show but Kalliovski insists on performing the bullet catch. He tampers with the pistol, which instantly kills Topolain.

While hiding from Kalliovski, Yann meets the Marquis' abused and neglected daughter Sido, and is instantly smitten by her. After escaping back to Paris with Sido's help , Têtu warns Yann he is in grave danger and insists he travel to London. Yann is bitter about this but reluctantly agrees.

Têtu's friend, Monsieur Cordell, arranges for Yann to stay with Henry and Juliette Laxton in London, who happen to be Sido's maternal aunt and uncle. Têtu reveals to Cordell that Kalliovski is actually Yann's biological father. Many years ago when he and Topolain worked in a circus with Yann's mother, Anis, Kalliovski had become obsessed with her but murdered her after she rejected him.

While trying to get Yann to safety, Têtu is shot by Kalliovski's henchman, Milkeye, while Yann is smuggled out of the country by Cordell and Mr Tull.

Despite the Laxtons' kindness to him, Yann is unhappy and homesick. After attempting to run away, he rescues a poor but eccentric actor named Mr Trippen from being robbed by throwing his voice to distract the thugs. Mr. Laxton eventually apologises to Yann and employs Trippen as his new tutor.

During Yann's absence, the political situation in France worsens with the impending threat of The French Revolution. Maître Tardieu, the Marquis' lawyer visits him one day warning him that he is bankrupt, and delivers a letter from Kalliovski demanding him to repay his debts, while also asking for Sido's hand in marriage. The Marquis initially refuses until he is threatened with a cryptic warning: "Remember your wife." Unwilling to suffer Kalliovski's wrath, he reluctantly agrees. Sido is understandably horrified by this arrangement, but is powerless to defy both Kalliovski and the Marquis.

During her father's fête one night, she overhears a heated conversation between the Marquis and his friend, Madame Perrien. Fearful for her life, she begs him to lend her money to repay her debts to Kalliovski. However, the Marquis refuses and ignores her warning that his own dealings with the Count will backfire. Perrien is indeed later murdered by Kalliovski, much to the Marquis' horror. He gradually descends further and further into madness.

The chateau is soon destroyed by a mob, prompting Sido and her father to escape through a secret tunnel with the help of their servants and are given refuge by another friend of the Marquis, the Duchesse de Lamantes.

Over the next few years, Yann gradually adapts to English society, but seems to have lost his gift to throw his voice and read minds. He becomes keen to learn about Têtu's telekinetic abilities, known as the 'threads of light'. One day, he meets a Romani family: Talo Cooper, his wife Orlenda, and his grandfather, Tobias. After Orlenda reads his fortune, Tobias successfully teaches Yann how to see and control the threads of light and gives him a magic talisman.

Yann soon receives news from Cordell that Têtu is alive. At the same time, the body of an old acquaintance of the Marquis is found by the Thames, prompting Yann suspicions about Kalliovski's involvement after Cordell notices his necklace around the victim's neck.

When word reaches Yann and the Laxtons that Kalliovski intends on making Sido his bride, he promptly returns to France in the hopes of rescuing her and reuniting with Têtu.

Upon Yann's return to Paris, he visits his old home, now renamed the Théâtre de la Liberté, and reunites with Têtu, Didier, the caretaker of the theatre, and Monsieur Aulard, the manager. Têtu is overjoyed to see him, and that he too can now see the threads of light, before finally revealing him the truth about his parentage.

Yann and Sido are briefly reunited and realises that he can read her mind. He tries to persuade her to forget about the Marquis and come back to England with him. She explains her situation including her forced-engagement to Kalliovski, and that the Duchesse had advised her and her father to find Mr. Tull who would smuggle them out of the country. Yann, however, remembers his encounter with Tull the night he was smuggled out of France and warns Sido not to trust him. He and Têtu later meet with Maître Tardieu who informs them that the Marquis wrote instructing him to end Sido's betrothal, but when he informed Kalliovski he received no reply. He gives them a bag of jewels that belonged to Sido's late mother, Isabelle Gautier, and Armand de Villeduval, the Marquis' half brother. Upon noticing seven familiar red garnets, Têtu realises that Isabelle and Armand were murdered by Kalliovski at the Marquis' request.

Yann attempts to see Sido again the next day but is too late as she and the Marquis have already been captured by Tull who was working for Kalliovski.

Sido falls ill and is visited in the night by Kalliovksi who attempts to coerce her into marrying him. Yann and Maître Tardieu visit her the next and again try to persuade her to leave. However, the ever gentle and good-hearted Sido cannot bring herself to abandon her insane and helpless father. After she is taken away, Maître Tardieu reveals that Isabelle and Armand were lovers –therefore, Sido is not the daughter of the Marquis, but of Isabelle and Armand; the pair had been attempting to elope to London with a three-year-old Sido at the time of their murder. This gives Yann and Têtu an idea that might help change Sido's mind.

They invite Kalliovski to a performance with a pierrot to distract him while Yann and Didier attempt to break into his apartment to find the love letters from Sido's parents. He discovers a room full of automatons made from Kalliovski's murdered victims, dubbed 'The Sisters Macabre' which he uses to hide all his secrets. He also discovers that Kalliovski can manipulate the 'Threads of Darkness'. Milkeye suddenly emerges and shoots Yann in the shoulder. Although weak, he uses his new magic abilities to make the Sisters Macabre talk. One of them opens a draw in their chest revealing the letters from Sido's parents and Kalliovski's 'Book of Tears' containing all the names of those who had borrowed money from him. He passes out but is rescued by Didier and taken back to the theatre where Têtu treats his wound.

Meanwhile, Sido finally decides that the Marquis isn't worth trying to help and that should Yann come for her, she will go with him. She is put on trial but declared innocent by pure luck right at the last minute. Amidst the chaos of the bloodshed, she's suddenly kidnapped by Kalliovski. Didier manages to stop their carriage by drawing a mob to it, allowing him and Yann to rescue Sido.

Yann confesses that although he loves her, her real family are waiting for her in London as he is staying behind to help more aristocrats escape from France. Sido doesn't want to be separated from Yann again but reluctantly agrees and he gives her his talisman as a token of his love.

Kalliovski is revealed to have survived the ordeal, sickened and enraged that he was defeated by a son he never wanted, he vows vengeance.

== Character list ==
- Yannick "Yann" Margoza – A young Romani boy with telepathic powers. An orphan, he is raised on the road amongst travelling entertainers, but is forced to flee to England and be raised by Sido's aunt and uncle after his band of roadsmen are murdered by Kalliovski. Due to his grief, he loses his powers, but later regains them when he returns to France, only to find that he cannot read any other mind except that of Sido, the girl he loves. Like Têtu and Topolain, he has telekinetic powers known as the 'threads of light.' He learns to improve his powers with the help of a Romani family, the Coopers. It is later revealed that he is Kalliovski's son, although he and Têtu firmly believe he is the spirit child of Anis and her late husband who died before Yann was born. He is fourteen at the beginning and seventeen at the end of the book.
- Sidonie "Sido" de Villeduval – The neglected, unloved only daughter of the pompous, idiot Marquis de Villeduval. She is twelve years old at the start of the book and fifteen at the conclusion making her two years younger than Yann. Although maybe too timid and kind for her own good, she is a brave and resourceful girl who simply wants to be loved. She has a limp in her left leg due to a carriage accident that killed her parents when she was three. She is described as being quite beautiful like a china doll, with porcelain skin, black hair and "bewitching" blue eyes. She helps Yann and Têtu escape from Count Kalliovski early in the novel and the two fall in love. Later it is revealed that her true parents are Isabelle Gautier and Armand de Villeduval, the Marquis' half brother. Kalliovski's main objective for coveting Sido is primarily to gain her inheritance as well as revenge on her late mother who had rejected his advances, much like Yannick's mother, Anis.
- Têtu – A Romani dwarf, who raised Yann. He and Topolain know the truth about Kalliovski, and was a very close friend of Yannick's mother, Anis. He loves Yann dearly as if he were his own. He too can work the threads of light which he also uses to aid in Sido's rescue.
- Count Kallivoski – Later "Citizen Kalliovski", an evil, murderous nobleman and the main antagonist of the novel. He frequently distributes vast loans to financially troubled aristocrats of France, asking them for their most incriminating secrets in return, and using these to blackmail his debtors into obeying him. If their debts aren't paid or they refuse to obey him, he murders them. He constantly makes advances on young Sido and blackmails the Marquis into agreeing to their betrothal. He kidnaps her near the end of the book but she is rescued by Yann. It is revealed that years ago, he lusted after both Yann's mother, Anis, as well as Sido's mother, Isabelle, but killed them both after they rejected him. Kalliovski's designs on Sido partially serve as revenge on her late mother, while also gaining her inheritance. Giving that Sido was the only survivor of the assassination and that Kalliovski prevented the Laxtons from adopting her, it is implied that he already had designs on her, even from a young age. He constantly keeps his loyal Irish Wolfhound, Balthazar, by his side.
- The Marquis de Villeduval – Sido's callous, stupid, foppish father who has bankrupted himself due to his incessant squandering of the family fortune, and owes an immense sum to Count Kalliovski, who threatens to reveal the Marquis' darkest secrets to the world unless the Marquis relinquishes Sido to him. The Marquis, caring nothing for Sido, wants to be rid of her, but also wishes to claim the inheritance left to her by her late grandfather in order to clear his debts. He is later driven to insanity after a mob of revolutionaries burn down his chateau and meets his end shortly after being arrested. Unbeknownst to Sido, The Marquis is really her uncle and responsible for the accident that injured her and killed her parents when she was a child.
- Henry and Juliette Laxton – Sido's maternal aunt and uncle who take Yann in after he arrives in London. The couple is unable to have children and want more than anything in the world to meet their niece. Like the majority of the characters, they dislike the Marquis and Kalliovski for causing Isabelle so much misery when she was alive and preventing them from adopting Sido after her death. They are eventually united with her at the end of the book. Juliette is described as bearing a striking resemblance to her niece.
- Jacques Topolain – A magician who helped raised Yannick. Although vain and cowardly at times, he is kind and loyal. He is murdered by Kalliovski after he lets it slip that he recognises him.
- Maître Tardieu – The mole-like lawyer and financial advisor to the de Villeduval family for over thirty years. Although devoted to the late elder Marquis and his late younger son, Armand, he despises the current Marquis for his cruelty and extravagance. He constantly warns the Marquis that he is in financial ruin, but the Marquis refuses to take heed. However, he holds Sido in high esteem and recognises her as a "true de Villeduval", due to her bravery and intelligence. He reveals in-depth knowledge of the de Villeduval family to the protagonists, namely that Armand de Villeduval and Isabelle Gautier were lovers, and assists Yann in rescuing Sido.
- Didier – The caretaker of the Théâtre du Temple (later the Théâtre de la Liberté) who helps Têtu and Yann save Sido.
- Monsieur Aulard – The manager of the Théâtre du Temple who also aids in Sido's rescue.
- The Coopers – Tobias, his grandson, Talo, and his wife Orlenda: A Romani family whom Yann makes a connection with and teach him how to use his magic.
- Mr. Trippen – A poor but eccentric and friendly actor whom Yann rescues from a robbery. He develops a friendship with the boy and is later employed as his tutor.
- Milkeye – Kalliovski's top henchman
- Armand de Villeduval and Isabelle Gautier – (both deceased) Armand was the Marquis de Villeduval's younger half-brother, their father's favourite child and was widely renowned for being kind-hearted, generous, intelligent and brave, unlike the selfish and malicious Marquis. Isabelle was wed to the Marquis in an arranged marriage; she and Armand however became lovers and Sido is their child. Isabelle was pursued by Kalliovski, but she rejected him and thus endangered her life. The Marquis, upon discovering their affair, schemed with Kalliovski to have them both murdered.
- The Elder Marquis de Villeduval – The deceased father of the current Marquis and the late Armand de Villeduval. The late Marquis was, unlike his eldest son, a kind-hearted man, and favoured the similarly compassionate Armand over his cruel and wasteful elder son. The Elder Marquis died broken-hearted after Armand was killed. The Elder Marquis knew that Armand and Isabelle Gautier were lovers, and bequeathed an enormous fortune to Sido for her to inherit upon her wedding day. His first wife, according to Maître Tardieu, died in an asylum after going insane; the current Marquis de Villeduval inherited his madness from her.

== The title ==
The title refers to the murder signature of Count Kalliovski, who puts round the necks of all his murder victims a necklace of red garnets strung on a thin red ribbon. The effect of the necklace is to make it look as if the wearer's throat has been cut.
