= David Prentice (disambiguation) =

David Prentice (1936–2014) was an English artist and art teacher.

David Prentice is also the name of:

- David R. Prentice (born 1943), American artist

== See also ==
- David Prentiss (disambiguation)
- Dave Prentis, trade unionist
