= The Countess's Calamity =

2003 children's book by Sally Gardner

- Author: Sally Gardner
- Illustrator: Sally Gardner
- Language: English
- Genre: Children's
- Publisher: Bloomsbury
- Publication date: 7 April 2003
- Publication place: United Kingdom
- Pages: 96 pp
- ISBN: 978-0-7475-5940-5
- OCLC: 59364102

The Countess's Calamity is a 2003 children's book written and illustrated by Sally Gardner. It won the Nestlé Smarties Book Prize Bronze Award. It is the first of the Tales from the Box series about sentient toys.

== Plot summary ==
After a box of toys is abandoned at a park, the intervention of some friendly mice helps the toys go on with their lives. One of the dolls, the Countess, has trouble adapting.
