= A Monster Calls =

2011 novel by Patrick Ness

- First edition cover
- Author: Patrick Ness (from an original idea by Siobhan Dowd)
- Illustrator: Jim Kay
- Cover artist: Jim Kay
- Language: English
- Genre: Fantasy
- Publisher: Walker Books
- Publication date: 5 May 2011
- Publication place: United Kingdom
- Media type: Print (hardcover)
- Pages: 214 pp (first edition); 152 pp (pdf edition)
- ISBN: 978-1-4063-1152-5
- OCLC: 754586643
- LC Class: PZ7.N43843 Mok 2011

A Monster Calls is a low fantasy novel written for young adults by Patrick Ness, adapted from an original idea by Siobhan Dowd, illustrated by Jim Kay and published by Walker Books in 2011. Set in present-day England, it features a boy who struggles to cope with the consequences of his mother's illness. He is repeatedly visited in the middle of the night by a monster who tells stories. Dowd was terminally ill with cancer when she came up with the idea for the story, and died before she could write it.

Ness and Kay respectively won the Carnegie Medal and the Kate Greenaway Medal in 2012, the "year's best" children's literary awards from the Chartered Institute of Library and Information Professionals (CILIP). A Monster Calls is the only book to have won both awards.

The novel was later adapted into a 2016 film and 2018 stage production of the same name.

== Origin ==
Siobhan Dowd conceived the novel while she had cancer. She discussed it and contracted to write it with editor Denise Johnstone-Burt at Walker Books, who also worked with Patrick Ness. After Dowd's death in August 2007, Walker arranged for Ness to write the story. Later, Walker and Ness arranged for Jim Kay to illustrate it, but Ness and Kay did not meet until after it was published in May 2011.

After winning the Carnegie Medal, Ness discussed the writing with The Guardian:

I wouldn't have taken it on if I didn't have complete freedom to go wherever I needed to go with it. If I'd felt hampered at all – again, even for very good reasons – then that harms the story, I think. And I did this not for egomaniacal reasons, that my decisions were somehow automatically right or some such nonsense, but because I know that this is what Siobhan would have done. She would have set it free, let it grow and change, and so I wasn't trying to guess what she might have written, I was merely following the same process she would have followed, which is a different thing.
...
I always say it felt like a really private conversation between me and her, and that mostly it was me saying, "Just look what we're getting away with."

Kay was selected based on illustrating one scene, solicited by art director Ben Norland:

Due to other commitments I had a weekend to produce an image, and I very hastily created the scene of the Monster leaning against the house. It was a technique I hadn't tried before, dictated to some degree by the time constraints, which in hindsight may have helped.
...
I imagine the story as a moving film or piece of theatre, and I start building the props and setting the scenery around the characters. I love the atmosphere, and I guess that's what I wanted to contribute. If I'd been left alone I would have avoided all of the key scenes, I was nervous about dealing with them, but Ben was fantastic in giving the book structure and, thankfully, insisting that I should tackle the explosive, energetic elements of the book.

== Plot ==
Thirteen-year-old Conor O'Malley awakens from the same nightmare he has been experiencing for the past few months, "the one with the darkness and the wind and the screaming."

At 12:07 AM, seven minutes after midnight, a voice calls to him from outside his bedroom window, which overlooks an old church and its graveyard sheltered by a yew tree. Walking to the window, Conor meets the monster who called, a towering mass of branches and leaves formed in a human shape from the yew tree. The monster is intrigued that Conor is not afraid of it and insists that Conor summoned it. The monster claims to be a version of the Green Man and warns that it will tell Conor three true stories, after which Conor must tell a story of his own, about the events of his nightmare.

Between its tales, which aim to demonstrate the complications inherent in humans, it is revealed that Conor's mother is undergoing treatment and has been afflicted with a terminal illness for the past year. Conor is isolated and alone. His father uses his new family in the United States as an excuse to be detached and unsupportive. His distant relationship with his pushy and cold grandmother provides no comfort either. Conor is a victim of bullying at school and he has distanced himself from all social contact other than that of the monster. As the story progresses, his mother's condition worsens and Conor's encounters with the monster have escalating consequences. The story also mentions an alleged "Pit Monster" and "Sky Monster".

At the end of the book the reader finds out why the monster has been coming and about the nightmare Conor fears: Conor holds onto his mother's arms, gripping her tightly as she is about to fall off a cliff. Conor loosens his grip, lets his mother fall purposely, though he could have held on to her longer. The monster came for Conor to confess the truth to his mother about how he wanted her to die so she did not have to suffer and he would not feel isolated, and ending the pain for both of them. By doing so, Conor could finally let his mother go. At 12:07 am, the time the monster usually arrived, Conor's mother died.

=== The Four Stories ===
The first story

An old king who has lost his entire family, except a young grandson, remarries a beautiful young woman many claim to be a witch. He dies before the young prince has come of age, leaving the step-grandmother as regent. She rules well and fairly, but—not wanting to hand over the kingdom—plots to marry the prince and remain queen.

The prince, who has a lover, runs away with his chosen bride, planning to flee to the neighboring kingdom. There they will marry and wait out the time until he's of age to claim the throne. They stop and sleep under the yew tree (the monster), but in the morning, the young woman is dead, having been murdered, and the shocked young prince is covered in blood. He reasons to the villagers that the queen must have killed his bride out of jealousy in order to keep her throne. Enraged, the commoners rally around the prince to storm the castle, and the monster follows. They capture the queen and condemn her to burn at the stake.

The monster arrives to snatch her from the fire and carry her away to a far-off land where she lives out the rest of her life. While disagreeable and a witch, she was not the one who had killed the girl. The prince had murdered her under the yew tree in order to inspire his people to back him into rebellion against the queen.

This story also discusses the need for humans to lie to themselves, such as the prince who wholeheartedly believes that the queen is responsible for his fiancée's death despite her being murdered by his hand, and their willingness to believe those lies for their own comfort and happiness.

The second story

A greedy, ill-tempered apothecary who follows the old traditions and beliefs constantly pesters a parson to allow him to cut down the yew tree in the churchyard and use it for medicinal ingredients. The apothecary becomes less and less popular and is nearly ruined, aided by the apothecary's own foul nature and the parson's active condemnation of him from the pulpit.

When a sickness sweeps the land and many die, the parson goes to the apothecary and asks him to save the lives of his two ill daughters after all other resources are exhausted. When the apothecary asks why he should help a man who has turned people away from his skills and denied him the yew tree, his best source of healing ingredients, the parson begs. The parson promises to give him the yew tree and deliver the parishioners to him as patients. In response to the parson's promise to revoke his beliefs and give up everything if only his daughters are healed, the apothecary says that he cannot help the parson and the girls die.

The monster awakens from the yew tree to destroy the parson's house and raze it to the ground as punishment. While the apothecary was a nasty, greedy man, he was a healer and would have saved many, including the girls, if the parson had given him the yew tree when first asked. The parson, however, was a man who lived by belief, but had none of his own, and changed his beliefs as it suited him. His disbelief of the apothecary's skill caused many to die, even his children. The healing traditions followed by the apothecary require belief in order to work; without the parson's, the apothecary was unable to treat the two girls.

At the end of the story, Conor participates as the monster destroys the parson's house, only to wake and discover that he has vandalized his grandmother's sitting room, shattering many valuable and beloved items beyond repair.

The third story

There was a man who was invisible because no one ever saw him. Tired of this, he summoned the monster to ensure no one forgot to see him again. The monster made them see, but there are harder things than being invisible. As this story is told, Conor is briefly possessed by the monster and physically and violently assaults Harry, the school bully, throwing him across the dining hall, putting the boy in the hospital.

The fourth story

Conor must confront his nightmare to tell the fourth story or face being engulfed by smoke and flames.

The church around the yew tree is destroyed and the land underneath Conor's mother's feet collapses, and she almost falls into the dark abyss. Conor holds onto his mother desperately but she eventually falls into the hole. The monster tells Conor to speak the truth but he refuses. The monster yells at Conor, calling for the truth until Conor finally yells that he wishes it was all over.

Although Conor loved his mother, he knew from the very beginning that she was going to die. He couldn't bear to not know when she would be gone and part of him, a selfish, very human part, simply wanted all the suffering to end. After Conor faces his truth his grandmother finds him and takes him to his dying mother's bedside at the hospital.

The fourth story ends with a young boy clinging tightly to his mother.

== Reception ==
A Monster Calls received widespread acclaim. Philip Pullman, author of the fantasy trilogy His Dark Materials, praised the novel as "compelling ... powerful and impressive", Similarly, The New York Times critic Jessica Bruder wrote "this is one profoundly sad story" and called the novel "a potent piece of art," applauding Kay's illustrations. Daniel Hahn from The Independent also praised A Monster Calls, saying that it was "brave and beautiful, full of compassion," and that "the result trembles with life." Publishers Weekly gave it a starred review and called it "a singular masterpiece."

=== Awards ===
Ness won the Carnegie Medal for writing and Kay won the Greenaway Medal for illustration, recognising the year's best work published in the UK. The double win alone is unprecedented in more than fifty years since the illustration award was established. A Monster Calls also won the British Children's Book of the Year, voted by an "academy of 750 book industry experts"; the Red House Children's Book Award, overall, a national award voted by British children; and the Kitschies Red Tentacle award for speculative fiction, best novel published in the UK. In the U.S., the American Library Association magazine Booklist named it the "Top of the List" for 2011 youth fiction.

Daily newspapers including The Independent, Chicago Sun-Times, and The Wall Street Journal named it in their year-end "Best" lists.

== Film adaptation ==
On 5 March 2014, Focus Features purchased the film rights to the book and at the time committed $20 million in P&A (prints and advertising) to release the movie. On 9 April 2014, it was announced that a film based on the book would be released by Focus Features on 14 October 2016. The film was directed by Juan Antonio Bayona and written by the book's author Patrick Ness. On 23 April 2014, Felicity Jones joined the film to play the boy's mother. On 8 May, Liam Neeson joined the film to voice the Monster. On 18 August, Sigourney Weaver joined to play the boy's grandmother. On 19 August, Toby Kebbell also joined the film to play the boy's father.

The film premiered on 10 September 2016 at the 2016 Toronto International Film Festival. It was released in Spain on 7 October 2016 and was released in the United States on 5 January 2017.

== Stage adaptation ==
On 24 October 2017, Patrick Ness announced via Instagram that a stage adaptation was being made. Sally Cookson was later announced as the director, with Adam Peck as Dramaturg (Writer in the Room) and Miranda Cromwell as associate director. The play won an Olivier Award in 2019 for Best Entertainment and Family. The play was previewed at the Bristol Old Vic on 7 July before having its first run at The Old Vic, as part of their 200th anniversary season, from 17 July.

Awards
| Preceded by Monsters of Men | Carnegie Medal recipient 2012 | Succeeded by Maggot Moon |
