= Chaos Walking =

Young adult sci-fi series by Patrick Ness

- Cover of the 1st book in the trilogy, The Knife of Never Letting Go
- The Knife of Never Letting Go; The Ask and the Answer; Monsters of Men
- Author: Patrick Ness
- Cover artist: Lynne Condellon (design); John Picacio (painting)
- Country: United Kingdom
- Language: English
- Genre: Young adult science fiction, dystopian adventure
- Publisher: Walker Books
- Published: 2008–2010
- Media type: Print (hardcover and paperback), e-book, audiobook
- No. of books: 3

Chaos Walking is a young adult science fiction series written by American-British novelist Patrick Ness. It is set in a dystopian world where all living creatures can hear each other's thoughts in a stream of images, words, and sounds called Noise. The series is named after a line in the first book: "The Noise is a man unfiltered, and without a filter, a man is just chaos walking." The series consists of a trilogy of novels and three short stories.

The three novels feature two adolescents, Todd Hewitt and Viola Eade, who encounter various moral issues and high stakes as the planet around them erupts into war. The Knife of Never Letting Go (2008) begins with Todd being forced to flee his town after discovering a patch of silence, free of Noise. In the second book, The Ask and the Answer (2009), tensions rise as a civil war between two opposing factions forms, and in the final book, Monsters of Men (2010), the indigenous species of New World rebels against the humans just as a ship full of new settlers is set to arrive on the planet. The first novel is narrated entirely by Todd, the second is told through the viewpoints of both Todd and Viola, and the third book is narrated by Todd, Viola and The Return.

The series has won almost every major children's fiction award in the UK, including the 2008 Guardian award, the James Tiptree, Jr. Award, and the Costa Children's Book Award. Monsters of Men won the Carnegie Medal in 2011. It has been praised for its handling of themes such as gender politics, redemption, the meaning of war, and the unclear distinction between good and evil, all threaded through its complex, fast-paced narrative.

In 2024, Ness announced a sequel trilogy with the series title New World. The first book, Piper at the Gates of Dusk was published in 2026.

== Conception ==
Ness claims that the idea for Chaos Walking came from "one really serious idea and one fairly stupid idea": how information overload affects youth, and how most fictional talking dogs "never actually talk like [how] I think dogs would actually talk". Ness planned the series as a trilogy from the start, deciding to theme Knife about flight, Ask about tyranny and Monsters about war.

== Series ==
=== The Knife of Never Letting Go ===
The Knife of Never Letting Go begins shortly before Todd Hewitt is to come of age and become a man. In Prentisstown, Todd has been brought up to believe that Noise is a result of a Spackle-created germ that killed all the women and unleashed Noise on the remaining men. After discovering a patch of silence out in the swamp, his surrogate parents immediately tell him that he has to run, leaving him with only a map of New World, his loyal yet mildly irritating dog Manchee, a message, and many unanswered questions. He soon discovers the source of the silence: a girl, named Viola. The two must hurry to warn other settlements of Prentisstown's preparations for war and escape Aaron, an insane preacher, as Mayor Prentiss prepares an army for conquest.

=== The Ask and the Answer ===
Following on from the events of the first book, The Ask and the Answer starts with the separation of Todd and Viola as they find out that the Mayor has reached Haven before them. Todd is locked up and forced to work with Davy Prentiss Jr. to overlook enslaved Spackle, while Viola undertakes an apprenticeship from a renowned healer, Mistress Coyle. However, Mistress Coyle also leads a terrorist organisation, the Answer, to retaliate against 'President' Prentiss, which drives Viola and Todd apart as they become further involved in the opposing factions.

=== Monsters of Men ===
In the final book of the Chaos Walking trilogy, a world-ending war erupts as three armies march into New Prentisstown. New World is in chaos as the Spackle and the settlers go to war, urged on by Mayor Prentiss and a rebel Spackle, 1017. Todd and Viola refuse to give up on each other or what they believe in, but to survive requires making difficult choices. The protagonists find that their decisions have dire consequences, and the stakes only get higher as all three sides fight for what they believe is right. Themes that were explored in previous books are finally brought to a head: whether redemption is possible, whether the lives of few are worth the lives of many, and what it takes to grow up in a world full of monstrous decisions.

=== Short stories ===
Ness has published three short stories set in the world of Chaos Walking. "The New World" was first published as a free download on 29 June 2009; "The Wide, Wide Sea" and "Snowscape" were published for free online on 16 May 2013. Each story is intended as a companion piece to the novels: "The New World" is intended to be read after The Knife of Never Letting Go; "The Wide, Wide Sea" after The Ask and the Answer; and "Snowscape" after Monsters of Men. The short stories were included in the 2013 UK editions of the novels.

==== The New World ====
"The New World" is a short prequel to the trilogy, detailing the events that led up to Viola's scout ship crashing into New World, before she met Todd Hewitt.

==== The Wide, Wide Sea ====
A prequel to the novels, "The Wide, Wide Sea" is set before the Spackle War during the last days of the fishing village Horizon. The story tells of a relationship between a teenage villager and a Spackle.

==== Snowscape ====
"Snowscape" is set after the events of Monsters of Men and is narrated by Lee. In the story, Lee and Wilf join an exploration party of new settlers travelling to the planet's northern frontier.

== Setting ==
Chaos Walking is set on a planet called New World, which was colonised by a small group of religiously devout settlers from Old World (possibly Earth) twenty three years prior to the beginning of The Knife of Never Letting Go. New World is the home of the native, intelligent Spackle as well as giant sea creatures. New World was originally colonised to make "a new way of life, one clean and simple and honest and good". In particular, the colonists aimed to establish a church that would leave behind corruption in favour of purity. However, the germ, present in the planet's atmosphere, posed several problems that halted the development of this vision. A second ship convoy, under the assumption that the first did not survive, arrives at New World at the end of Monsters of Men.

=== Prentisstown ===
In the beginning, it is under the assumption that Prentisstown, populated only by males, is the sole human settlement on New World, and that all females were killed by a biological warfare disease during the war against New World's intelligent native species, called the Spackle. However, this is proved false with the revelation of the town's true history. Near the end of book one, it is discovered that all Prentisstown women had been killed in an act of insanity after the Spackle War, fuelled by the town mayor (Prentiss) and a deranged priest (Aaron).

Men following Prentisstown's mayor originally aimed to take over New World as revenge for being isolated for their crimes, accepting Mayor Prentiss as their absolute leader. As the series concludes countless of Prentiss' followers are killed, effectively cannon fodder in the final apocalyptic war against the Spackle. Countless Spackle, too, are killed, though the reader gains far deeper insight into their way of life and organisation, mainly through the authorial voices of The Sky and The Return. By now war is in Prentiss' hands serving now not so much the aim of revenge for past acts, but the satiation of his megalomaniacal desire for absolute control of the planet. This control, however, comes at the price of absolute knowledge, a Faustian burden that is in the end too great to bear.

=== Haven ===
Being the largest settlement on New World, Haven was the leading developer of technology and research. They had developed a cure for the Noise, and were the last town to be taken over by Prentisstown, to whom they surrendered. At the end of The Knife of Never Letting Go, the town was renamed New Prentisstown, and Mayor Prentiss quickly assumed the role of President. Prior to this, the residents of Haven had captured and kept Spackle as servants, The Burden, who have all been killed, aside from 1017. This spurred the war that took place in the final book, Monsters of Men.

== Characters ==
- Todd Hewitt: The protagonist of the series. He is forced to flee from Prentisstown after discovering a 'hole' in the Noise. Brought up by his surrogate parents, Ben and Cillian, Todd was kept unaware of Prentisstown's true history until the end of the first book. Throughout the novels, he is faced with difficult moral decisions, and is known as "the boy who can't kill." He nearly dies in the last book, though he is revived.
- Viola Eade: The second protagonist of the series. Crash-landed on New World with her parents during a scouting mission sent ahead by a group of new settlers. She meets Todd when he detects her silence (on New World, women have no Noise) and they end up travelling together to warn the incoming settlers about the Mayor's gathering army. She later becomes one of the narrating characters starting from book two.
- Manchee: Todd's pet dog. A gift from Cillian for Todd's twelfth birthday, his thoughts are audible because of the Noise germ. He is Todd's closest friend, and follows Todd unconditionally after they escape Prentisstown. He dies at the hands of Preacher Aaron.
- Ben Moore: Ben is Todd's adoptive father who was a friend of his mother's. He and Cillian raised Todd and helped him escape when he discovered that it was possible to escape the Noise. He later rejoined him and told him and Viola the truth about Prentisstown. He is a great source of hope for Todd, and he ultimately stops him from becoming like the Mayor. Like Mayor Prentiss, he can hear all noise in the world, though he is more controlled.
- 1017/The Return: A Spackle who grew up domesticated in Haven. He is introduced in The Ask and the Answer. As a captive of The Ask's army, 1017 grows angry and vengeful, directing this hate at Todd (known to him as The Knife) due to Todd's lack of action on his moral beliefs. Later named 'The Return' when he arrives at the Spackle settlement, he eventually gathers a rebellion against the human settlers.
- Mayor David Prentiss: The series' main antagonist. He is the mastermind behind the takeover, and later becomes self-proclaimed President of New World. He is extremely charismatic and manipulative, often choosing to play mind games instead of resorting to brute force. He learns to control his Noise, and can even use it as a weapon. Despite his cruelties, a running theme throughout the trilogy is whether or not he can be redeemed. He becomes sea monster food after being able to hear all noise in the planet drives him insane.
- Mistress Nicola Coyle: The leader of the Answer. She sets up a camp away from Haven, committed to removing Mayor Prentiss from power. She enlists Viola's help and shows members of the Answer how to set off homemade bombs. Although she does not resort to torture, she is just as manipulative and calculating as Mayor Prentiss. While she calls herself a freedom fighter, the members of The Ask label her as a terrorist. Despite being the head of an organisation with just intentions, she is willing to do anything to end the Mayor's regime, even at the cost of sacrificing lives, including her own. She eventually blows herself up.
- Davy Prentiss: Mayor Prentiss' son. He begins as an antagonist, but as the story progresses it is revealed he craves his father's praise and attention, something he rarely receives. He also becomes more friendly with Todd, returning his stolen mother's book. During a standoff between the Mayor and Todd, Davy attempts to intervene but Todd threatens to shoot him unless the Mayor backs down. The Mayor reveals that he would not care anyway, and shoots Davy himself. He dies asking for Todd's forgiveness, revealing that he shot Ben.
- The Sky: The leader of the spackle who hears their entire population's noise. He is killed by Mayor Prentiss during the peace talks, conferring his leadership to 1017.
- Angharrad: Todd's horse.
- Acorn: Davy's horse. It had an alternate name for her, Deadfall.

== Reception ==
The Chaos Walking novels have been critically acclaimed.

On the overall series, the Costa Prize Judges said that they were "convinced that this is a major achievement in the making", while the Guardian stated that "I would press Patrick Ness’s Chaos Walking trilogy urgently on anyone, anyone at all. It is extraordinary". In their review of the final book, Publishers Weekly called the series "one of the most important works of young adult science fiction in recent years." Robert Dunbar wrote in The Guardian that the series "will almost certainly come to be seen as one of the outstanding literary achievements of the present century, whether viewed as fiction for the young or for a wider readership."

The Knife of Never Letting Go was received with near universal praise for its originality and narration from critics such as Ian Chipman from Booklist and Megan Honig from the School Library Journal. It went on to win several awards and recognitions, including the Guardian Award, and the 2008 James Tiptree, Jr. Award.

The second book was also received well, with praise from Publishers Weekly, Children's Literature and Kirkus Reviews, all noting the excellent plot and cast. It was named as one of "the best YA science fiction novels of the year" by Publishers Weekly while Kirkus called the characters "heartbreakingly real" and praised the questions brought up about "the meaning of war and the price of peace." The book won the 2009 Costa children's fiction prize and was recognised widely for its success.

The third book, Monsters of Men, has received greatly positive reviews and won the 2011 Carnegie Medal. It was also nominated for the Arthur C. Clarke award for best science fiction novel, only the second time that a young adult novel made it on to the shortlist.

All three books were shortlisted for the Carnegie Book Award.

== Film adaptation ==
Lionsgate acquired worldwide distribution rights to a film adaptation of the Chaos Walking trilogy, which was produced by Doug Davison's production company Quadrant Pictures. Allison Shearmur and Davison produced, Doug Liman directed, and Daisy Ridley starred in the film alongside Tom Holland, Mads Mikkelsen and Nick Jonas. The screenplay was originally going to be written by Ness, Charlie Kaufman and John Lee Hancock, but Kaufman dropped out of the project before it was released, because of creative differences. Shooting started in August 2017 in Montreal. The original release date was intended to be 1 March 2019, however this was postponed until 22 January 2021, to accommodate for reshoots, after test screenings came with poor reception. The release was postponed once again, to March 5, 2021, due to the COVID-19 pandemic.

The film released on 5 March 2021, to generally negative reviews. Many critics noted that the film did not live up to the source material from the books.
