= More than This (novel) =

2013 young adult novel by Patrick Ness

More Than This
- Author: Patrick Ness
- Language: English
- Genre: Young adult novel
- Publisher: Candlewick Press
- Publication date: 5 September 2013
- Publication place: United Kingdom
- Media type: Print, ebook
- Pages: 480 pp (first edition)
- ISBN: 978-0-7636-6258-5

More Than This is a young adult novel by Patrick Ness, published by Candlewick Press in 2013. It follows a teenage boy named Seth who, after drowning in the ocean, wakes up alone on a desolate suburban English street in what he believes to be hell.

== Plot ==
The book begins with a 16-year-old boy, Seth Wearing, drowning. He finds himself in what he assumes is a hell made for him, as it resembles the Southern English town he was born in before moving to America but is completely abandoned. (The town's exact location is never stated, but it is within commuting distance of London.) Whenever he sleeps, he flashes back to events in his life. Seth remembers that when he was eight, he was left alone by his mother with his four-year-old brother, Owen. An escaped convict, let into the house by Seth, kidnapped Owen for three days. This left him with psychological damage and prompted the family's move to Halfmarket, a small coastal town in Washington, USA. Also described is Seth's secret homosexual relationship with male friend, Gudmund.

In Seth's old bedroom, he finds an open coffin containing "conductive tape" and tubes, which he woke up in before fleeing. Later, Seth sees a black van driving through town. A girl, Regine, and a boy, Tomasz, prevent him from getting close to it, telling him that they must hide from what they call the Driver. They too had died and awoken in coffins.

Regine tells Seth her theory – on account of the world's decline the entire population decided to enter a simulated recreation (indistinguishable from reality) permanently, with automated coffins carrying out bodily functions. Therefore, the place they occupy is the real world. Global issues mentioned include fires, climate change, wars, epidemics, economic chaos and closures of European borders. The three children woke up in the real world because, while dying, they each knocked a system connection implant on the back of their heads. Seth wonders if more coffins are stored in the prison near his house, and decides to go there against the others' warnings.

At the prison, Seth does find thousands of people in coffins, including his parents (but not Owen). By the next day, Seth recalls the true course of his life – in reality, Owen was killed by the convict. His parents, unable to bear their grief, entered the online world permanently in a process called Lethe. Although the kidnapping could not be wiped from their memories, the death could, allowing them to resume their lives believing Owen was found and living with a digital replacement of him. The prototype's flaws were concealed by the "psychological damage" he had supposedly undergone. Soon after, world events led all of the human race to enter Lethe. Seth also reveals to the others that his own death was not accidental, instead he had committed suicide after he and Gudmund were outed and their relationship forcibly ended.

The Driver seizes and reconnects Regine to a coffin, placing her back in Lethe so that she can die properly. Once rescued by Seth and Tomasz, Regine claims that she remembered the real world while she was back online. Seth theorises that the gas from a particular tube numbs their memories, so if they do not inhale it, they can connect to the simulation while still remembering the real world. If Seth could be reinserted just before his death, he could choose not to go through with it, travel between both worlds and share the truth.

The three set out to Seth's coffin, but are stopped by the Driver. A violent fight follows in which Seth is stabbed by the Driver. Inexplicably, the Driver itself heals Seth. Tomasz, not realising this, uses the Driver's baton to destroy it. Seth takes to his coffin, and finally says, "I'm ready."

== Reception ==
More Than This was reviewed favourably by critics and readers. Martin Chilton of The Daily Telegraph describes the novel as "an impressively challenging and philosophical book for young adults," capturing "ambiguity and bewilderment of being young and the uncertainty of what will happen to any of us next in life." Tony Bradman of The Guardian concurred, writing: "Seth is a terrific exemplar of the eternal teenage desire for there to be, in the words of the novel's title, 'more than this'". As of early March 2015, the book scores 4.04 out of 5 stars on the social reading site Goodreads. John Green's review of More Than This is printed on the front cover of the book. Green comments, "Just read it."
