= Nina Lowry =

British barrister and judge

- Born: Noreen Margaret Collins; 6 September 1925; Hampstead, London, United Kingdom
- Died: 30 March 2017 (aged 91); Hammersmith, London, United Kingdom
- Education: Birmingham University
- Occupations: Barrister; Judge

Noreen Margaret Lowry (née Collins, 6 September 1925 – 30 March 2017) was a British barrister and judge at the Old Bailey, where she was the first permanent female judge.

== Early life ==
Noreen Margaret Collins was born on 6 September 1925 at 82 Adelaide Road in Hampstead, London. Noreen was the eldest daughter of John Edmund Collins (1895–1971), a paint salesman, and Hilda Grace (née Gregory) (1901–1984).

Collins was educated at Bedford High School, a private school for girls aged 7 to 18 in Bedford, England. Collins was awarded a place at Lady Margaret Hall, Oxford, but wartime regulations prevented her from taking up the offer. Collins instead read law at the University of Birmingham.

== Personal life ==
Collins married Edward Lucas Gardner (1912–2001), a barrister and recorder, in 1950. They had a son and also a daughter, the writer Sally Gardner. Noreen's marriage to Gardner was dissolved in 1962. Noreen married Richard John Lowry (1924–2001), a barrister, on 24 April 1963.
