= The Knife of Never Letting Go =

2008 novel by Patrick Ness

- First edition cover
- Author: Patrick Ness
- Language: English
- Series: Chaos Walking #1
- Genre: Young-adult, science fiction
- Publisher: Walker Books
- Publication date: 5 May 2008
- Publication place: United Kingdom
- Pages: 496
- ISBN: 978-1-4063-1025-2
- OCLC: 233261939
- Followed by: The Ask and the Answer

The Knife of Never Letting Go is a young adult science fiction novel written by British American author Patrick Ness. It was published by Walker Books on 5 May 2008. It is the first book in the Chaos Walking series, followed by The Ask and the Answer and Monsters of Men. The story follows Todd Hewitt, a 12-year-old boy who runs away from Prentisstown, a town where everyone can hear everyone else's thoughts.

The novel was celebrated by critics and won annual awards including the Booktrust Teenage Prize, the Guardian Award, and the James Tiptree, Jr. Award. The Knife was Ness's first work for teens and young adults. According to The Guardian coverage of its award, Ness "turned to children's fiction after he had the idea for a world where it is impossible to escape information overload, and knew it was right for teenagers."

A film adaptation of the novel, titled Chaos Walking, was released on 5 March 2021.

== Plot ==
Todd Hewitt is the only boy left in Prentisstown, a small settlement on New World – an alien planet recently colonized by humans. Todd is within days of his thirteenth birthday, the age at which all Prentisstown boys become men.

Todd has been told all the women and nearly all the men on New World were killed in a war with the Spackle – the planet’s native inhabitants – and that Prentisstown is the last remaining settlement. The Spackle are blamed for the release of the Noise germ, a virus that is purportedly fatal to all women. As a side effect of the virus, the remaining men on New World can hear each other’s (and animals') thoughts in an ever-present “Noise”.

One day Todd and his dog, Manchee, discover a "hole in the Noise" in the swamp. When Todd explains this patch of silence to his adoptive parents, Ben and Cillian, his Noise accidentally projects the discovery to the entire town, forcing Ben and Cillian to accelerate their plan to have Todd escape Prentisstown, which they had been planning for his entire life. Todd reluctantly flees to the swamp with Manchee, where he discovers the source of the hole in the Noise: Viola, a girl whose scout ship crash-landed on New World. Todd, Manchee and Viola are attacked by Aaron, the town preacher, but escape when Aaron is mauled by a crocodile. Aided by a map inside Todd's mother's diary, the three travel towards Farbranch, another settlement.

Hildy, a woman from Farbranch, finds Todd and Viola and reveals that the Noise germ is not fatal and does not affect women at all – no women have Noise. She takes the three to her settlement. At nightfall, Mayor Prentiss and his men arrive and burn down the town, killing all those who will not join their army. Todd, Viola, and Manchee flee for Haven, where a rumoured cure for Noise exists. They also hope to find a transmission tower to contact Viola's people, a second wave of settlers.

After days on the road they are found by Davy, Mayor Prentiss’s son. Todd tries to kill him but is unable to follow through. Instead, he ties Davy up before heading off for Haven with Viola. En route, Todd, Viola and Manchee find a live Spackle. Todd is shocked, believing all Spackle were wiped out in the war. Todd kills the Spackle but instantly regrets it. Aaron finds them, stabs Todd, and kidnaps Viola. Todd pursues Viola and Aaron and, using Manchee as a distraction, attempts to rescue Viola. The plan fails, and Todd and Viola flee on a boat, leaving Manchee behind, who is killed by Aaron. Todd passes out from his wounds.

Days later, Todd wakes up under a care of a doctor in another settlement, where Todd encounters Ben hiding in the outskirts of town. Later, Ben explains the truth: the Noise germ is a natural contagion of the planet, not an attack by the Spackle. Men driven mad by Noise and who resented women’s ability to remain silent murdered all women in Prentisstown. For their crimes, Prentisstown was exiled by New World, and if any men were to leave the town, they would be executed.

Ben, Todd, and Viola continue toward Haven, but Davy finds them again. Ben distracts Davy to allow Todd and Viola to run, who are cornered by Aaron in a cavern near a waterfall by Haven. Todd realises that the Prentisstown process of becoming a man involves murdering someone. Aaron thinks of himself as a symbolic sacrifice for the last boy in Prentisstown and tries to provoke Todd into killing him. To stop Aaron from succeeding, Viola stabs him in the neck. He falls into the waterfall and dies.

Davy again intercepts Todd and Viola on their way to Haven, shooting Viola. Todd subdues Davy and carries a dying Viola to Haven to get help, but Mayor Prentiss is already there to greet them. After Haven surrendered without a fight, the Mayor declares himself President of New World. With no other choice, Todd surrenders to the Mayor to save Viola.

== Setting ==
The Knife of Never Letting Go is set in a town that has been taken over by a small group of religious settlers from Old World, in a town near a swamp. Although the settlers have some advanced technology, they are mostly subsistence farmers. The rural setting has been compared to the worlds of the Adventures of Huckleberry Finn and The Night of the Hunter.

== Reception ==
The Knife of Never Letting Go has received greatly positive reviews. Ian Chipman from Booklist gave the novel a starred review, praising the "pure inventiveness and excitement" of Ness's narrative, and supporting the book's characters, adding that "the cliffhanger ending is as effective as a shot to the gut".

Frank Cottrell-Boyce, writing for The Guardian, praised the novel's opening, and added that the rest of the book "lives up to the thrill of that first sentence". The Sunday Telegraph also praised the book, describing it as "furiously paced, terrifying, exhilarating and heartbreaking" and calling it a book that "haunts your imagination". The Times called it "a stunning debut" and "as compelling as it is original".

Similarly, Nicholas Tucker of The Independent wrote that The Knife of Never Letting Go "sets a high standard", while the Chicago Tribune labelled the novel as "a read-alone, stay-up-way-too-late book".

=== Awards ===
| Year | Award | Result | Ref |
|---|---|---|---|
| 2008 | Booktrust Teenage Prize | Won | |
| 2008 | Guardian Award | Won | |
| 2008 | James Tiptree, Jr. Award | Won | |
| 2009 | Carnegie Medal | Shortlisted | |
| 2009 | Manchester Book Award | Longlisted | |

== Film adaptation ==
In 2011, Lionsgate bought the rights to adapt the Chaos Walking trilogy for film. The president of Lionsgate, Joe Drake, said the decision was made because "a sense of urgency and momentum permeates these stories – it makes the books ones you can't put down, and will make the movies ones you can't miss on the big screen".

In 2011, it was announced that Chaos Walking: The Knife of Never Letting Go would be produced by Doug Davison while Jamie Linden would be writing and Doug Liman was in negotiations to direct the film. On 5 August 2016 it was announced that Tom Holland and Daisy Ridley would star in the adaptation.

The screenplay was written by Ness, Charlie Kaufman, and John Lee Hancock, and was directed by Doug Liman. Shooting started in August 2017. The release date was 1 March 2019, but was delayed because of both COVID-19 and reshoots. The film was theatrically released in the US on 5 March 2021.
