= The Ask and the Answer =

2009 young-adult science fiction novel by Patrick Ness

- First edition cover
- Author: Patrick Ness
- Language: English
- Series: Chaos Walking
- Genre: Young-adult, science fiction
- Publisher: Walker Books
- Publication date: 4 May 2009
- Publication place: United Kingdom
- Pages: 519 (1st ed)
- ISBN: 978-1-4063-1026-9 (1st ed)
- OCLC: 310156536
- Preceded by: The Knife of Never Letting Go
- Followed by: Monsters of Men

The Ask and the Answer is a 2009 young-adult science fiction novel written by British-American author Patrick Ness. It was published on 4 May 2009 by Walker Books. It is the second book in the Chaos Walking series, preceded by The Knife of Never Letting Go and followed by Monsters of Men. The story follows Todd Hewitt, a 13-year-old boy held captive by the mayor of New Prentisstown.

== Plot summary ==
Todd Hewitt is captured by the Mayor's army in Haven, renamed New Prentisstown. He is forced to live in the town's clock tower with the previous Mayor, Con Ledger. Ledger explains that Haven discovered a cure for Noise, but Mayor Prentiss (now President Prentiss) has confiscated it for sole use by leaders of New Prentisstown. He has separated the males and females, and imprisoned all domestic Spackle who live in the town.

Viola awakens in a clinic staffed by female healers for her gunshot wound. She meets Mistress Coyle, the head of the facility, who has previous political and activist ties.

Todd is made to work with the enslaved Spackle of New Prentisstown with Davy Prentiss, fearing for Viola’s safety if he refuses. Todd is disgusted at the treatment of the Spackle while Davy is proud of his authority. As the Spackle speak via Noise, cure has been placed into the Spackle's food to prevent communication.

Viola recovers enough to help Coyle and begins an apprenticeship as a healer. One night Coyle and other healers disappear, leading some women out of New Prentisstown to form a resistance movement reconvened from the time of the Spackle War, known as "The Answer", to carry out bombings in the city.

Davy and Todd receive orders to brand the Spackle with numbered metal bands. During the branding, Davy strangles a Spackle with a band, killing it, to Todd’s horror.

During a bombing in the Spackle reserve, Todd saves a Spackle branded with the number 1017, who is ungrateful. Prentiss sets up "The Ask", a counter-intelligence unit, responsible for capturing and torturing suspected members of The Answer for information. Todd and Davy are promoted into this unit.

Coyle recruits Viola into The Answer, who feels compelled to join, knowing about Prentiss's tortures. Viola befriends Lee, an older teenager intent on avenging his family taken by The Ask.

After another bombing, Todd finds that all the Spackle were killed in a genocide except 1017, who attacks Todd before leaving. Led to believe that The Answer was responsible for the Spackle massacre, Todd agrees to willingly join Prentiss, who teaches Todd a chant to calm his Noise.

Todd and Davy form a tentative friendship, with Davy returning Todd's mother's stolen diary. Meanwhile, Viola learns of a planned bombing in New Prentisstown that could harm Todd. Viola and Lee arrive at the tower to rescue him. Ledger then appears, armed, revealing his secret loyalty to Prentiss. While threatening them, he finds a self-arming bomb in Viola's bag. Ledger attempts to dispose of it, instead killing himself and injuring Todd, Viola and Lee, who are then captured by Prentiss.

Viola is interrogated for information about where The Answer will attack from, with Todd watching from a soundproof room. Unable to watch Viola being tortured, Todd reveals that The Answer is attacking from the south. Prentiss leaves to organise his army. Todd formulates a plan to stop Prentiss with the help of dissenters from Prentiss’s army.

Todd and the dissenters rescue Lee and Viola. Lee runs to warn The Answer while the others go to stop Prentiss. At the cathedral, Prentiss disables the entire group with his Noise and captures Viola. Prentiss still wants Todd to join him despite his betrayal. Prentiss reveals that he has never taken the cure, instead training his Noise via the chant to silence, which also allows him to control others with his mind. Davy arrives to tell his father that The Answer army is coming, and requires orders.

A second scout ship, like the one Viola crashed in, appears above New Prentisstown. Todd holds Davy at gunpoint, threatening to kill him if Prentiss does not release Viola. Prentiss shoots Davy, mortally wounding him. Davy reveals that he had accidentally shot Ben, Todd's guardian. He begs for forgiveness but dies before Todd can answer.

In anger, Todd uses his own Noise as a weapon with Viola's name to overcome Prentiss. He ties him up in the cathedral while Viola goes to meet with the scout ship. A horn sounds to warn of an army of Spackle marching towards the city, seeking revenge for the genocide. With no alternative, Todd releases Prentiss to enlist help.

== Reception ==
The Ask and the Answer received largely positive reviews from critics. Publishers Weekly praised the brilliant cast, and believed it to be "among the best YA science fiction novels of the year", including it in their best books of 2009, while Anita Barnes Lowen from Children's Literature labelled the book "a stunning not-to-be-missed science fiction adventure." The Independent on Sunday said that "... it is every bit as ambitious as the first book but the ambition is easily matched by the execution, with powerful prose and tight plotting that pull the reader on at a terrifying speed."

Kirkus Reviews noted that the plot was "breathless... with heartbreakingly real characters" and the Costa Book Awards 2009 judges recognised the novel as "a strikingly original and compelling work."

=== Awards ===
Year	Award	Result	Ref
2009	Costa Children's Book Award	Won	
2009	Booktrust Teenage Prize	Longlisted	
2009	UKLA Children's Book Award	Longlisted	
2010	Carnegie Medal	Shortlisted	
