= Patrick Ness =

American-British writer (born 1971)

Patrick Ness FRSL
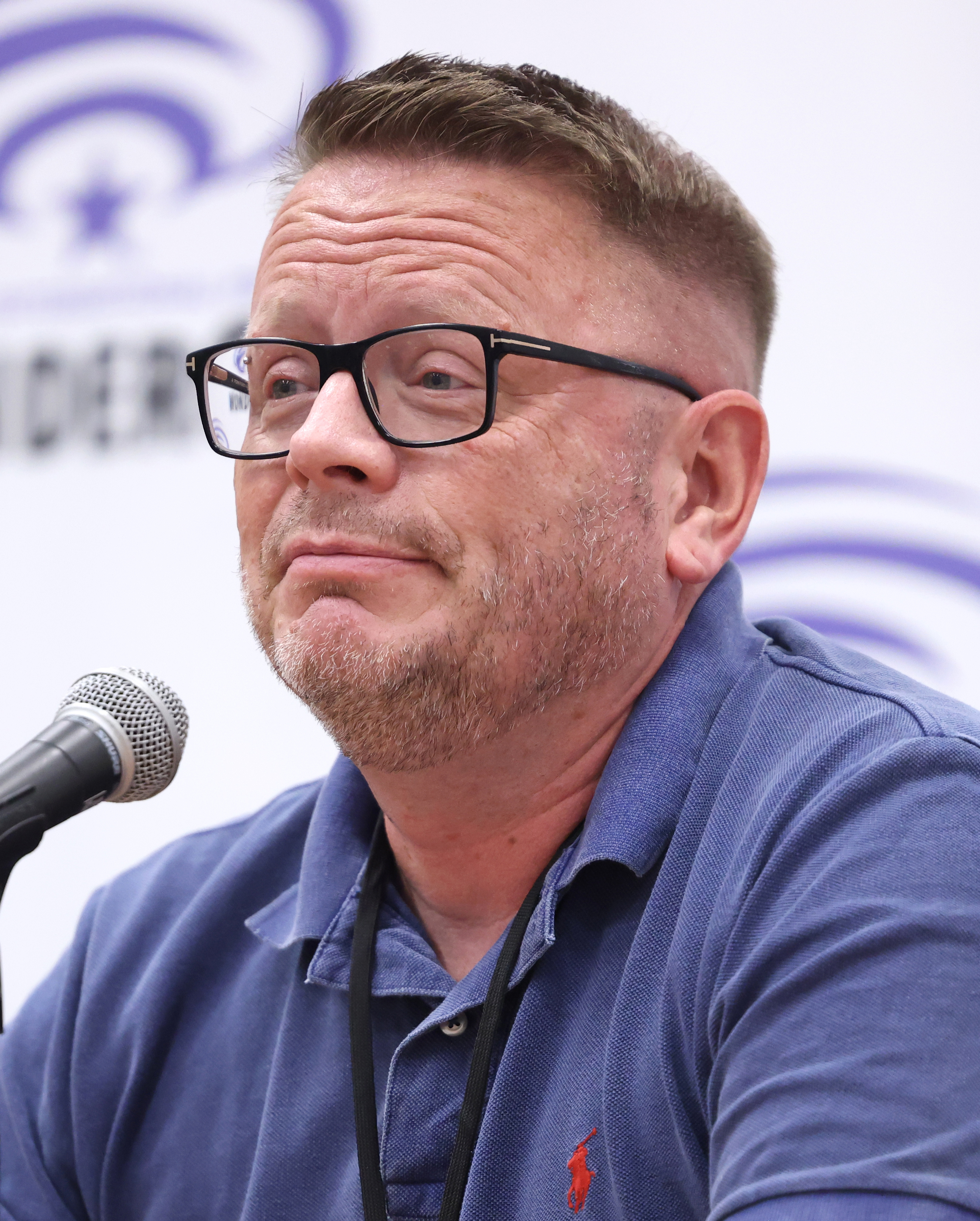
- Ness in 2025
- Born: 17 October 1971 (age 54); Fort Belvoir, Virginia, U.S.
- Education: University of Southern California
- Occupations: Author; writer; producer
- Spouses: Unknown (m. 2013, divorced) Nick Coveney (m. 2022)
- Writing career
- Genre: Young adult
- Notable works: Chaos Walking; A Monster Calls

Patrick Ness FRSL (born 17 October 1971) is an American-British author, journalist, lecturer, and screenwriter. Born in the United States, Ness moved to London and holds dual citizenship. He is best known for his books for young adults, including the Chaos Walking (2008–2010) trilogy and A Monster Calls (2011).

Ness won the annual Carnegie Medal in 2011 and in 2012, for Monsters of Men and A Monster Calls. (Note: The publication years defining the two Carnegie Medals were September to August 2009/2010 and 2010/2011, approximately the latest completed school years.) He is one of seven writers to win two Medals, and the second to win consecutively.

He wrote the screenplay of the 2016 film adaptation of A Monster Calls, and was the creator and writer of the Doctor Who spin-off series Class.

== Early life ==
Ness was born near the Fort Belvoir Army base, near Alexandria, Virginia, where his father was a Sergeant in the US Army. They moved to Hawaii, where he lived until he was six, then spent the next ten years in Washington, before moving to Los Angeles. Ness studied English Literature at the University of Southern California. As a teenager, Ness had OCD.

After graduating, he worked as corporate writer for a cable company. He published his first story in Genre in 1997 and was working on his first novel when he moved to London in 1999.

== Career ==
Ness's first novel, The Crash of Hennington, was published in 2003, and was followed by his short story collection, Topics About Which I Know Nothing, in 2004.

Ness's first young adult novel was The Knife of Never Letting Go. It won the Guardian Children's Fiction Prize in 2008. The book was followed by The Ask and the Answer, and Monsters of Men. Together, the three books make up the Chaos Walking trilogy. Ness has also written three short stories set in the Chaos Walking universe; the prequels "The New World" and "The Wide, Wide Sea", and "Snowscape", which is set after the events of Monsters of Men. The short stories are available as free-to-download ebooks, and have been included in the 2013 UK print editions of the novels.

A Monster Calls originated with the Irish writer, Siobhan Dowd, who had been diagnosed with cancer and was unable to complete the story before she died in 2007. Dowd and Ness shared an editor at Walker Books, Denise Johnstone-Burt, and after Dowd's death, Walker arranged for Ness to complete the story from her notes. Ness says his only guideline was to write a book he thought Dowd would have liked. Jim Kay was hired to illustrate the book, and the two completed the book without meeting. Ness won the Carnegie and Kay won the companion Kate Greenaway Medal, the first time one book has won both medals.

Ness was the author of Tip of the Tongue, an e-short featuring the Fifth Doctor and Nyssa as part Puffin's eleven Doctor Who e-shorts in honour of the show's 50th anniversary, released on 23 May 2013.

His fourth young adult novel, More Than This, was published on 5 September 2013. It later made the Carnegie Medal shortlist of 2015.

The Crane Wife, Ness's third novel for adults, was published on 30 December 2014.

In 2014, Ness delivered the keynote speech at the Children's and Young Adult Program of the Berlin International Literature Festival.

The Rest of Us Just Live Here was published 25 August 2015 in the UK, Ireland, Australia, and New Zealand, and 5 October 2015 in Canada and the United States.

On 1 October 2015, the BBC announced that Ness would be writing a Doctor Who spin-off entitled Class. The resulting eight-part series aired on BBC Three's online channel toward the end of 2016. The BBC cancelled Class after one series, A later series of audio dramas produced by Big Finish Productions also feature the characters.

Release, was published on 4 May 2017, described by Ness as a "private and intense book" inspired more by his personal feelings than any before it.

In June 2021, Ness was said to be preparing a prequel script to the Napoleonic sea adventure movie Master and Commander: The Far Side of the World, based on the works of Patrick O'Brian.

In March 2025, Ness's first book for adults in over a decade, Meridian, was announced, to be published in spring 2027 by Canongate Books. Later that month, Ness was attached to write the screenplay for an adaptation of The Count of Monte Cristo, starring and produced by Regé-Jean Page.

== Personal life ==
Ness was naturalised as a British citizen in 2005. He entered into a civil partnership with his partner in 2006, less than two months after the Civil Partnership Act came into force. In February 2023, Patrick disclosed on Instagram that he had married Nick Coveney in Las Vegas in October 2022. He also stated that within the previous "4 or 5 years" he had divorced.

Ness taught creative writing at the University of Oxford and has written and reviewed for The Daily Telegraph, The Times Literary Supplement, The Sunday Telegraph and The Guardian. He has been a Fellow of the Royal Literary Fund, and was the first Writer in Residence for BookTrust.

In 2023, Ness was elected a Fellow of the Royal Society of Literature.

== Awards ==
Year	Title	Award	Category	Result	Ref
2008	The Knife of Never Letting Go	Booktrust Teenage Prize	—	Won	
2008	The Knife of Never Letting Go	Guardian Children's Fiction Prize	—	Won	
2008	The Knife of Never Letting Go	Tiptree Award	—	Won	
2009	The Knife of Never Letting Go	Carnegie Medal	—	Shortlisted	
2009	The Ask and the Answer	Costa Book Award	Children's Book	Won	
2010	The Ask and the Answer	Carnegie Medal	—	Shortlisted	
2011	Monsters of Men	Arthur C. Clarke Award	—	Shortlisted	
2011	Monsters of Men	Carnegie Medal	—	Won	
2015	More Than This	Carnegie Medal	—	Shortlisted	
2016	The Rest of Us Just Live Here	Carnegie Medal	—	Shortlisted	
2016	The Rest of Us Just Live Here	YA Book Prize	—		
2017	The Rest of Us Just Live Here	Rhode Island Teen Book Award	—		
2018	The Rest of Us Just Live Here	Lincoln Award	—		
2018	Release	Carnegie Medal	—	Shortlisted	
2024	Chronicles of a Lizard Nobody	Nero Book Award	Children's fiction	Shortlisted	
2026	Chronicles of a Lizard Nobody	Carnegie Medal	—	Shortlisted	

The Rest of Us Just Live Here received many awards, including six starred reviews and the Kirkus Best Book of the Year.

== Works ==
=== Novels ===
- —— (2003). The Crash of Hennington.
- —— (2013). The Crane Wife (hardcover ed.). Canongate Books. pp. 1–311. ISBN 978-0857868718.

=== Novels for young adults ===
==== Chaos Walking series ====
1. The Knife of Never Letting Go (2008)
2. The Ask and the Answer (2009)
3. Monsters of Men (2010)
- Short stories
  1.5. "The New World" (2009)
  2.5. "The Wide, Wide Sea" (2013)
  3.5. "Snowscape" (2013)

==== The New World Trilogy ====
1. Piper at the Gates of Dusk (Spring 2026)

==== Standalone ====
- —— (2011). A Monster Calls (paperback 1st ed.). Walker Books. pp. 1–215. ISBN 978-1406334906.
- —— (2013). More Than This (hardcover ed.). Walker Books. pp. 1–480. ISBN 978-1406331158.
- —— (2015). The Rest of Us Just Live Here (hardcover 1st ed.). Walker Books. pp. 1–348. ISBN 978-1406331165.
- —— (2017). Release (paperback 1st ed.). Walker Books. pp. 1–287. ISBN 978-1406377279. (2017)
- —— (2018). And the Ocean Was Our Sky (hardcover 1st ed.). Walker Books. pp. 1–160. ISBN 978-1406383560.
- —— (2020). Burn (hardcover 1st ed.). Walker Books. pp. 1–383. ISBN 978-1406375503.
- —— (2023). Different for Boys (Hardcover ed.). Walker Books. pp. 1–104. ISBN 978-1536228892.
- —— (2024). Chronicles of a Lizard Nobody (Hardcover ed.). Walker Books. pp. 1–208. ISBN 978-1536235937.
- —— (2025). Chronicles of a Lizard Nobody: The Hat of Great Importance (Hardcover ed.). Walker Books. pp. 1–208. ISBN 978-1536241266.

=== Short stories ===
- "Different for Boys", collected in Losing it (2010)
- "Doctor Who: Tip of the Tongue" (2013), collected in Thirteen Doctors, 13 Stories (2019)
- "This Whole Demoing Thing", collected in Monstrous Affections: An Anthology of Beastly Tales, ed. Kelly Link and Gavin J. Grant (2014)

==== Collections ====
- Topics About Which I Know Nothing (2004), collection of 11 short stories:
  "Implied Violence", "The Way All Trends Do", "Ponce de Leon is a Retired Married Couple From Toronto", "Jesus' Elbows and Other Christian Urban Myths", "Quis Custodiet Ipsos Custodes?", "Sydney is a City of Jaywalkers", "2,115 Opportunities", "The Motivations of Sally Rae Wentworth, Amazon", "The Seventh International Military War Games Dance Committee Quadrennial Competition and Jamboree", "The Gifted", "Now That You've Died"

== Filmography ==
Year	Title	Credited as		Notes	Ref.
Year	Title	Writer	Executive Producer	Notes	Ref.
2016	A Monster Calls	Yes	Yes	Based on his novel A Monster Calls (2011)	
2016	Class	Yes	Yes	Doctor Who television spin-off; also creator (8 episodes)	
2021	Chaos Walking	Yes		Co-screenwriter (with Christopher Ford). Based on his novel The Knife of Never Letting Go.	

== External links/sources ==
- Official website
- Patrick Ness at British Council: Literature
- Patrick Ness at the Internet Speculative Fiction Database
- Patrick Ness at the Library of Congress, with 8 library catalogue records
- The Knife Of Never Letting Go, chapter one
- Opening speech by Ness at the children and youth program of the International Literature Festival Berlin
