= Pilot Theatre =

Pilot Theatre is an Arts Council England funded theatre company based in York, England. It was founded in 1981 by students from Bretton Hall College in Wakefield. The company was based in Wakefield and Castleford before moving to York in 2001.

== History ==
The company is now based at York Guildhall. It tours work in the UK and internationally. As of July 2016, the company's artistic direction is led by Esther Richardson. The previous artistic director, Marcus Romer, who wrote, directed, and shaped the identity of the company since 1995, has since moved on to establish Arts Beacon.

In 1998, Pilot Theatre embarked on their first mid-scale UK tour with their production of Lord of the Flies, which went on to win the company numerous awards and great critical acclaim. Since then the company has developed links with theatres around the country, in particular York Theatre Royal where they were residents.

They were part of the EU Culture 2000 funded programme called Magic-Net along with twelve other countries across Europe, and in 2009, they became the UK partner for the European project Platform 11+, which engaged 13 theatres in 12 European countries to create new pieces of theatre for 11 to 15-year-olds. This has opened the door for international touring and collaborations. In 2011 the company toured to Milan, Dresden and Argentina and in 2012 hosted companies from around the EU at a week-long event in York as well as visiting the Czech Republic.

They produced the International Indian Film Academy Awards opening sequence for stage and TV in 2007 at Sheffield Arena. This was in partnership with their new collaborators, Kit Monkman and Tom Wexler from KMA, who are also based in York.

Pilot Theatre has also advocated for using digital technologies within the arts. This has grown through their annual hosting of the Shift Happens conference, which explored new digital technologies and possible uses for them within the arts sector. In 2011 Pilot Theatre hosted the first ever TEDx York event in conjunction with Science City York. Working with online video experts Kinura, Pilot Theatre delivered the multichannel livestream of the world-famous York Mystery Plays in August 2012 as part of their involvement in the BBC and Arts Council England funded project The Space.

In the same year, Pilot began a large scale cooperation project funded by the European Commission under their European Culture Funding Stream Creative Europe. This project, entitled PLATFORM shift+, consists of 11 partners from 9 countries—ten theatres and a university.

In 2014, they began work on the Boomerang – Documents of Poverty and Hope project. This is one of 12 successful projects being run by the European Commission under their Cooperation project with Third Countries — European Culture Funding Stream. Pilot Theatre is working with five other theatres; the Australian Theatre for Young People, Sydney; Dynamo Theatre, Montreal; Presentation House Theatre, Vancouver; Elsinor Theatre, Milan; and O Bando Theatre, Portugal, on the issue of migration and its impact on young people across continents.

Continuing Pilot's history of International work, they are currently a partnering organisation on PlayOn!, a cooperation project announced by the European Commission under their Culture Funding Stream Creative Europe, which will run from 2019 – 2023. PlayOn! was initiated by 9 theatres with experience in the use of digital technologies and a university with high digital expertise. 8 universities from the creative digital sector are associated partners in order to facilitate access to technical knowledge.

The company won the Excellence in Touring award and was a finalist for Best Show for Children and Young People at the UK Theatre Awards 2019 for their stage production of Malorie Blackman's novel Noughts and Crosses, adapted by Sabrina Mahfouz. They won three Manchester Evening News awards for Lord of the Flies, by William Golding, adapted by Nigel Williams, and Beautiful Thing, by Jonathan Harvey. Other work includes Sing yer heart out for the lads, by Roy Williams, Road by Jim Cartwright, Bloodtide by Melvin Burgess, The Beauty Queen of Leenane by Martin McDonagh, Kiss of the Spider Woman by Manuel Puig, Mirad a Boy from Bosnia by Ad de Bont, Rumble Fish by S.E. Hinton, Look Back In Anger by John Osborne, The Elephant Man by Bernard Pomerance, Fungus the Bogeyman by Raymond Briggs, The Twits by Roald Dahl and Looking for JJ and Antigone.

They won the Manchester Evening News Award for best production for their tour of Lord of the Flies in 2001. The production was revived and a tour took place in 2008.

Pilot Theatre have embraced new technologies both on and off-stage. They built their production of Looking for JJ on MySpace and have the first UK Theatre hub in Second Life.
