= Knife (disambiguation) =

A knife is a sharpened hand tool.

Knife or knives may also refer to:

== Tools/weapons ==
- Blade
- dao, single-bladed Chinese swords
- Knife (envelope)

== Music ==
- The Knife, a Swedish electronic music duo
- Knife (album), by Aztec Camera
- The Knife (Goldfinger album)
- The Knife (The Knife album)
- "Knife" (Grizzly Bear song)
- "The Knife" (song), by Genesis
- "Knife", a song by Rockwell from Somebody's Watching Me
- "Knife", a song by Enhypen from The Sin: Vanish
- "The Knife", a song by Maggie Rogers from Heard It in a Past Life
- "Knives", a song by 10 Years from Minus the Machine
- "Knives", a song by Kim Petras from Turn Off the Light
- "Knives", a song by Shrubbies from Memphis in Texas
- "Knives", a song by Therapy? from Troublegum

== Film and television ==
- The Knife (1961 film), a Dutch film
- The Knife (1967 film), a Yugoslav film
- The Knife (1999 film), a Yugoslav film
- The Knife (2024 film), an American psychological drama film
- "Knives" (Babylon 5), TV series episode
- Knife, TV series character from Annoying Orange

== Books ==
- Knife (novel), a 2019 novel by Jo Nesbø
- Knife: Meditations After an Attempted Murder, a 2024 memoir by Salman Rushdie
- Knife, a 2009 novel by R. J. Anderson and the first novel in the Faery Rebels series
- The Knife, a 1961 novel by Hal Ellson

== Other uses ==
- Duncan McCoshan, cartoonist in the Knife and Packer team
- "The Knife", nickname of Martin de Knijff, Swedish gambler
- The Knife, nickname for Yellowknife, Northwest Territories, Canada

== See also ==
- Knife River (disambiguation)
- Mack the Knife (disambiguation)
