= Concorde Book Award =

Annual prize for children's literature

The Concorde Book Award is an annual prize for children's literature awarded by South Gloucestershire secondary school students. It may be compared with the United Kingdom's Children's Book Award, a national children's literature prize awarded through voting by children.

A group of South Gloucestershire school and public librarians founded the Concorde Book Award in the 2007–2008 school year, with the first award ceremony being held in 2008. Each year, secondary school students in South Gloucestershire are invited to nominate a recently published book for the award longlist. A small panel of librarians selects six books from the longlist to form the Concorde Book Award shortlist, which is announced in early fall.

Once the shortlist is announced, students may join reading groups at their school or public library to read and discuss the novels on the shortlist, before casting their vote for a winner. Voting is held on World Book Day, which is celebrated in March in the United Kingdom, though other countries typically observe it in April.

== List of winning and shortlisted books ==
Concorde Book Award
Year	Author	Title	Honor	Reference
2020	Onjali Q. Raúf	The Boy at the Back of the Class	Winner	
2020	Tracy Darnton	The Truth About Lies	Shortlisted	
2020	Sophie Green	Potkin and Stubbs	Shortlisted	
2020	Kate Saunders	The Land of Neverendings	Shortlisted	
2020	Gabriel Dylan	Whiteout	Shortlisted	
2020	Ali Sparkes	Thunderstruck	Shortlisted	
2019	Karen M. McManus	One of Us is Lying	Winner	
2019	Lisa Heathfield	Paper Butterflies	Winner	
2019	Helena Duggan	A Place Called Perfect	Shortlisted	
2019	R. J. Anderson	A Pocket Full of Murder	Shortlisted	
2019	Mitch Johnson	Kick	Shortlisted	
2019	Katherine Rundell	The Explorer	Shortlisted	
2018	Sarwat Chadda writing as Joshua Khan	Shadow Magic	Winner	
2018	Oli White	Generation Next	Shortlisted	
2018	Kathryn Evans	More of Me	Shortlisted	
2018	Sophie Cleverly	Scarlett and Ivy: The Lost Twin	Shortlisted	
2018	Zana Fraillon	The Bone Sparrow	Shortlisted	
2018	Ross Wellford	Time Travelling with a Hamster	Shortlisted	
2017	Robin Talley	Lies We Tell Ourselves	Winner	
2017	M G Leonard	Beetle Boy	Shortlisted	
2017	Ali Sparkes	Car-Jacked	Shortlisted	
2017	Chris Columbus	House of Secrets	Shortlisted	
2017	Robin Stevens	Murder Most Unladylike	Shortlisted	
2017	Andy Lane	Night Break (Young Sherlock Holmes #8)	Shortlisted	
2016	Emma Pass	The Fearless	Winner	
2016	Sarah Crossan	Apple and Rain	Shortlisted	
2016	Benjamin Zephaniah	Terror Kid	Shortlisted	
2016	Marcus Sedgwick	She is not Invisible	Shortlisted	
2016	Rob Lloyd Jones	Wild Boy	Shortlisted	
2016	Rob Stevens	Would the Real Stanley Carrot Please Stand Up?	Shortlisted	
2015	Gillian Cross	After Tomorrow	Winner	
2015	J.A. Buckle	Half My Facebook Friends are Ferrets	Shortlisted	
2015	Katherine Rundell	Rooftoppers	Shortlisted	
2015	David Levithan	Every Day (2012)	Shortlisted	
2015	Steve Feasey	Mutant City	Shortlisted	
2015	Holly Goldberg Sloan	Counting by 7s	Shortlisted	
2014	Terri Terry	Slated	Winner	
2014	Jon Mayhew	The Bonehill Curse	Shortlisted	
2014	David Walliams	Gangsta Granny	Shortlisted	
2014	Sally Gardner	Maggot Moon	Shortlisted	
2014	R.J. Palacio	Wonder	Shortlisted	
2014	Liz Pichon	Everything's Amazing (Sort Of)	Shortlisted	
2013	Alexander Gordon-Smith	The Fury	Winner	
2013	Gareth P. Jones	Space Crime Conspiracy	Shortlisted	
2013	Ally Kennen	Bullet Boys	Shortlisted	
2013	Panama Oxridge	Justin Thyme	Shortlisted	
2013	Jon Mayhew	Demon Collector	Shortlisted	
2013	Mark Robson	The Devil’s Triangle	Shortlisted	
2012	Suzanne Collins	The Hunger Games	Winner	
2012	Terence Blacker	Missing, Believed Crazy	Shortlisted	
2012	Rachel Ward	Numbers	Shortlisted	
2012	Anthony Horowitz	Scorpia Rising	Shortlisted	
2012	Michelle Harrison	The Thirteen Treasures	Shortlisted	
2012	Andy Mulligan	Trash	Shortlisted	
2011	R.J. Anderson	Knife	Winner	
2011	Narinder Dhami	Bang, Bang, You're Dead!	Shortlisted	
2011	Ali Sparkes	Frozen in Time	Shortlisted	
2011	Keith Mansfield	Johnny Mackintosh and the Spirit of London	Shortlisted	
2011	Suzanne LaFleur	Love, Aubrey	Shortlisted	
2011	Michael Morpurgo	Running Wild	Shortlisted	
2010	Frank Cottrell Boyce	Cosmic	Winner	
2010	Sophie McKenzie	Blood Ties	Shortlisted	
2010	Anne Cassidy	Forget Me Not	Shortlisted	
2010	Michelle Magorian	Just Henry	Shortlisted	
2010	Steve Voake	The Starlight Conspiracy	Shortlisted	
2009	Sally Nicholls	Ways To Live Forever	Winner	
2009	F.E. Higgins	The Black Book of Secrets	Shortlisted	
2009	Stuart Hill	Blade of Fire	Shortlisted	
2009	Jenny Valentine	Broken Soup	Shortlisted	
2009	Tim Bowler	Frozen Fire	Shortlisted	
2008	Anthony Horowitz	Raven's Gate	Winner	
2008	Michael Morpurgo	Alone on a Wide Wide Sea	Shortlisted	
2008	John Boyne	The Boy in the Striped Pyjamas	Shortlisted	
2008	Steve Voake	The Dreamwalker's Child	Shortlisted	
2008	Louis Sachar	Small Steps	Shortlisted	

== See also ==
- Blue Peter Book Awards
- Carnegie Medal
- Children's Laureate
- Kate Greenaway Medal
- Nestle Smarties Book Prize
- Red House Children's Book Award
