= Knife and Fork =

Knife and Fork, Fork & Knife, Knife-Fork, may refer to:

== Cutlery and utensils ==
- Knife and fork, two pieces of cutlery that are commonly used together
- A combination eating utensil, sometimes called a 'knork', a fork-knife, a knife-fork, a combination of fork and knife; a variant of the spork/splayd utensil
- Greek for "cutlery" (Greek: μαχαιροπήρουνο, romanized: /maçeɾoˈpiɾuno/, lit. 'fork-knife'), a dvandva

== Arts, entertainment, media ==
- Fork & Knife, a 2018 film starring Rosaline Elbay
- Fortnite, a videogame nicknamed "Forkknife"
  - Fortnite Battle Royale, nicknamed "Fork Knife"

=== Music ===
- The Fork and Knife (2026), an upcoming album by Skepta
- 'kNIFE & fORK', a band founded by Eric Drew Feldman

==== Songs ====
- "A Knife and a Fork", a 1966 song by Kip Anderson, later covered by Dave Edmunds and Rockpile
- "Knife and Fork", a song by Stan Ridgway from the 1966 album Black Diamond
- "(Fork and Knife)", a 2007 single by Brand New

== Masonry ==
- knife and fork, a symbol of the Masons; see History of Freemasonry
- Knife and Fork Club, a secretive Masonic club; see Paul Elliott Martin, James H. McBirney

== Places ==
- Knife and Fork Inn, Atlantic City, New Jersey, United States
- Knife & Fork Delicatessen, Massachusetts Avenue Parking Shops, Washington, D.C., USA
- Knife and Fork Tavern, Bridgeville, Delaware, USA; a 19th-century tavern owned by Charles Polk Jr. (1788–1857)
- Knife + Fork, NYC, NYS, USA; see List of Chopped episodes (seasons 1–20)
- Knife and Fork Gastropub, San Antonio, Texas, USA; see List of Restaurant: Impossible episodes

== Other ==
- Knife & Fork, a food annual from The Daily Progress, Charlottesville, Virginia, USA

== See also ==
- Knife and Fork in New York, a 1948 restaurant guide by Alexander Lawton Mackall
- "Knife Fork Spoon", a sculpture by William Parry, exhibited at the International Museum of Dinnerware Design, Kingston, New York State, USA
- Fork, Knife and Spoon (FR006), a 1998 album by 'The Agency' from Fiddler Records
- Fork Knife Spoon, a 2004 record by Hewhocorrupts
- "Kašika, viljuška, nož" (Serbian: Spoon, Fork, Knife), a 2000 song by Urgh! (band) off the album Sumo
- All pages with titles containing "Knife" and "Fork"
- Knife (disambiguation)
- Fork (disambiguation)
