= Kit Monkman =

Artist and filmmaker

Kit Monkman is an artist and filmmaker known for his work with KMA and for directing the experimental feature film, Macbeth (2018).

== Public Art ==
From 2005 to 2017 Kit Monkman worked with Tom Wexler on a series of interactive installations which transformed numerous public spaces, from London's Trafalgar Square to Shanghai's Bund, into impromptu theatrical arenas in which the distinction between performer and audience was blurred.

The first large-scale work, Flock, was commissioned by London's Institute of Contemporary Arts (ICA) in 2007 and described by the ICA's then director, Ekow Eshun, as "a whole new realm for 'live' artistic experience"

2010's, Congregation represented the UK Pavilion at the Shanghai World Expo that year. Following its debut in Shanghai, Congregation has been staged seven other times including performances at Tate Britain in London also in 2010, a 2014 performance at Market Square in Pittsburgh, Pennsylvania, and most recently in 2016 in the town of Enschede in the Netherlands.

A 2020 work People We Love was presented in York Minster in 2021 and has its US premiere in Pittsburgh in April 2022.

== Film ==
Kit Monkman has also directed two experimental feature films, the first a co-direction with Marcus Romer of Universal Picture's 2014 visually experimental The Knife that Killed Me, and Macbeth (2018), an entirely green-screen adaptation of Shakespeare's tragedy.

Screen Rant placed the film number two in a list of 10 Shakespeare Screen Adaptations You Probably Haven't Watched (But Definitely Should), "Considering how stunning it is, Kit Monkman's 2018 adaptation of Macbeth has flown remarkably under the radar. It does not even have a consensus on Rotten Tomatoes yet. .... A visually captivating marvel of the big (and the green) screen, this Macbeth is not to be missed."
