= Bloodtide =

Bloodtide may refer to:

- Bloodtide (audio drama), a 2001 audio drama based on the British TV series Doctor Who
- Bloodtide (novel), a 1999 novel by Melvin Burgess
- Blood Tide, a 1982 British film directed by Richard Jefferies
- Bloodtide (comics), a supervillain from Marvel Comics
