= Midget (disambiguation) =

Midget is a term for a person of unusually short stature that is considered by some to be pejorative.

== Arts, entertainment, and media ==
- Midget (band), a band
- Midget (novel), a novel by Tim Bowler
- The Midgets, an album by Joe Newman

== Sports ==
- Midget car racing, a racing class of relatively small automobiles
- Midget wrestling, wrestlers who are dwarves or people of short stature
- Midget (ice hockey), an U18 age category in minor hockey
- Midget Wolgast (1910–1955), a world flyweight boxing champion

== Transportation ==
- Daihatsu Midget, a car
- MG Midget, a car
- Mikoyan-Gurevich MiG-15UTI, an aircraft
- Midget submarine, any submarine under 150 tons
