= Buried Thunder =

Young adult novel by Tim Bowler

- 2011 Hardback Edition Cover
- Author: Tim Bowler
- Language: English
- Genre: Young adult
- Publisher: Oxford University Press
- Publication date: 3 February 2011
- Publication place: United Kingdom
- Media type: Print (Hardback)
- Pages: 255
- ISBN: 978-0-19-272838-8
- OCLC: 663438178

Buried Thunder is a young adult novel written by British author Tim Bowler. It was first published in 2011 in the UK. It is a psychological thriller whose central character is a fourteen-year-old girl called Maya who has just moved to the countryside with her parents and brother. She senses an evil presence in the hotel where they are living and makes a horrific discovery in the forest nearby.
