= Kite (novel) =

1997 young adult novel by Melvin Burgess

- First edition cover
- Author: Melvin Burgess
- Illustrator: Ken Brown
- Publisher: Andersen Press
- Publication date: December 11, 1997
- ISBN: 978-0-862-64737-7

Kite is a 1997 young adult novel about red kites written by British author Melvin Burgess and illustrated by Ken Brown. It contains 15 chapters.

== Plot summary ==
When Taylor Mase steals a red kite egg, he is not expecting it to hatch out — but it does. Taylor feels an urge to protect the fragile baby bird, which faces many hazards, including Taylor's own father, a gamekeeper.

== Publishing Information ==
- Kite (Hardcover ed.). Andersen Press. 1997. ISBN 978-0-862-64737-7.
