= Fungus the Bogeyman =

1977 children's picture book by Raymond Briggs

- First edition
- Author: Raymond Briggs
- Illustrator: Raymond Briggs
- Genre: Children's
- Published: 1977 at Hamish Hamilton
- Publication place: United Kingdom
- Pages: 42
- ISBN: 0-241-89553-7
- OCLC: 4035276
- Dewey Decimal: 741.5/942 19
- LC Class: PN6737.B7 F8

Fungus the Bogeyman is a 1977 children's picture book by British artist Raymond Briggs. It follows one day in the life of the title character, a working class Bogeyman with the mundane job of scaring human beings. The character and all related properties are now owned by Studiocanal.

== Plot ==
The book follows a typical day for Fungus the Bogeyman, starting when he wakes up and ending just before he falls asleep. As his day progresses, he undergoes a mild existential crisis, pondering what his seemingly pointless job of scaring surface people is really for. He is a member of the Bogey society, which is very similar to British society, but Bogeymen enjoy things which humans (called Drycleaners because of their contrasting environmental preferences) would not be comfortable around; for example darkness, damp, cold and over-ripe food. The book depicts the mundane details of Bogey life in loving detail, with definitions of Bogey slang and numerous annotations concerning the myths, pets, hobbies, literature, clothing and food of the Bogeys.

Much of the humour derives from word play. For example, Bogeymen are shown to enjoy eating and sharing flies in a similar way to human cigarettes; one brand of fly is the "strong French Gallwasp", a pun on the cigarette Gauloises.

== Adaptations ==
Over a period of decades, a number of attempts were made to make a film from the book, which was difficult given its lack of an actual plot. In 2002 the BBC began work on a three-part TV comedy series, which ultimately aired in November 2004 and is available as a DVD, starring Clare Thomas as Jessica White, Martin Clunes as her father and Mak Wilson as Fungus. This Gala Films production with screenplay by author Mark Haddon, featuring live-action humans and animated Bogeys, was nominated for five awards. It tells of how Jessica, a human teenager, finds her way into Bogeydom and meets Fungus and his family. The family has an addition, a daughter named Mucus, and Fungus' son Mould (who featured in the original book) is a teenager going through a rebellious phase: cleaning things instead of dirtying them.

A three-part adaptation, featuring Timothy Spall as the title character, aired on Sky1 in December 2015 and was partly shot at West London Film Studios. This adaption also starred Marc Warren, Keeley Hawes, Joanna Scanlan, Jimmy Akingbola, Paul Kaye, and also Victoria Wood in her final television role before her death in April 2016. It was produced by Andy Serkis's motion-capture studio, The Imaginarium, with Serkis also as the narrator.

A stage production, based on the book, was performed at artsdepot in North London between November 2007 and August 2008. A co-production with Pilot Theatre, the show was directed and adapted by Marcus Romer and designed by Ali Allen.

The book also inspired the song "Bogey Music" by Paul McCartney, which was released on McCartney II. The liner notes state this inspiration, and also claims the song "is the first record made by 'dry cleaners' for the expanding Bogey market."

== TV series ==
- Fungus the Bogeyman (Original) (28 November – 12 December 2004)
- Fungus the Bogeyman (Revival) (27 – 29 December 2015)
