= Faery Rebels =

Fantasy novel series

- The first edition for the first book, Knife
- Knife (2009); Rebel (2009); Arrow (2011)
- Author: R. J. Anderson
- Country: United Kingdom
- Language: English
- Publisher: Orchard Books (UK); HarperCollins (US); Enclave Publishing (US)
- Published in English: 2009–2011
- Media type: Print, e-book
- No. of books: 3
- Website: http://www.rj-anderson.com/books/

Faery Rebels, also known as No Ordinary Fairy Tale, is a three-book fantasy series by Canadian author R. J. Anderson. Each book of the series centers around a faery who must venture out of their island to save the faery race.

The first novel in the series, Knife, was published in the United Kingdom by Orchard Books on 8 January 2009. Subsequent books in the series were Rebel (2009) and Arrow (2011). Knife was also published in the United States through HarperCollins and was re-titled Faery Rebels: Spell Hunter. HarperCollins also re-titled the second book, Rebel, which they released as Wayfarer in 2010. These books would later receive another United States release through Enclave Publishing in 2015, where they were released under their original UK book titles but with a new series title, No Ordinary Fairy Tale.

Anderson later released a separate series set in the same universe, Ivy of the Delve, which consists of two books, Swift and Nomad.

== Synopsis ==
=== Knife ===
Knife is a young faery hunter. The faery race is dying off and Knife is convinced that humanity may hold the key to saving them from almost certain extinction as their magic is slowly disappearing, and will not last much longer. However her Queen is adamant that faeries and humans should never mix. Despite this, Knife defies her ruler, meeting and befriending the paraplegic artist Paul McCormick, to whom she is instantly and inexplicably drawn.

=== Rebel ===
Linden is a teenage faery that must venture out into the human world to find a way to save her people, as she is one of the few among them with any usable knowledge of the outside world. In the process she meets Timothy, who was taken in by his cousin, Paul McCormick, and his wife Peri, after his boarding school suspends him. Timothy has a gift for guitar music, something that placed him into the path of some faeries keen on taking it from him. Linden manages to save him, only for this to make the both of them a target.

=== Arrow ===
Rhosmari is a young faery that has led a peaceful, yet sheltered existence, as her home lies on one of several islands that are free of any human contact. Apart from a group who have already left to help the rebel group, her people want little to do with the faeries from the mainland and their politics, but Rhosmari leaves alone to retrieve a precious artefact, the Stone of Naming, in the hopes that its retrieval could prevent them getting drawn into the fray. This proves to be easier said than done, as the young faery quickly experiences major culture shock due to the many differences between the mainland and the remote islands. Things grow worse when the evil Empress sets her sights on enslaving Rhosmari's people.

== Critical reception ==
Critical reception for the series has been mostly positive. Knife was widely praised for its story and imagination, and Strange Horizons commented that the relationship between Paul and Knife worked especially well as it "manages to be both completely individually theirs and also more universally that of a couple of any kind, needing to negotiate their differences—of background, experience or just habit—with flexibility and generosity of spirit." NATE Classroom wrote a mostly favourable review of Knife, writing "The setting of the story lacks the intricacy of a fully built fantasy world that readers may be seeking. Instead it relies on the relationship between the characters to draw in the reader. It is a spellbinding fairytale dark enough to keep any boy or girl totally engrossed from beginning to end."

School Librarian gave Rebel a favourable review, praising it for its complexity and stating that it "is a book to enchant anyone who loves a fairy story." The Horn Book Guide and the School Library Journal echoed similar sentiments, with the School Library Journal writing that "Awkwardly out of place Christian doctrine may distract some readers, but, all in all, this is an enjoyable story that will appeal to fantasy fans."

=== Awards and nominations ===
- CLA Book of the Year for Children Award (2010, nominee – Knife)
- Concorde Book Award (2010, won – Knife)
- Carnegie Medal (2010, nominee – Knife)
- Christy Award (2015, Young Adult Category finalist – "Rebel")

== Flight and Flame Trilogy ==
In 2012 Anderson published Swift through Orchard Books. Its sequel, Nomad, followed in 2014 and a final book, Torch, in 2021. The series is set within the same universe as the Faery Rebels series but is considered to be separate.

=== Swift ===
Swift follows Ivy, a Cornish piskey born without wings. Years earlier her mother went missing during the Lighting ceremony, an important event within her clan that marked the first time Ivy went outside of the tin mine her clan calls home. Her father assumes that she was stolen away by spriggans and becomes emotionally and physically distant from his children, leaving Ivy to assume their daily care. When another faery goes missing the clan is sure that it is due to the spriggans. Ivy eventually meets Martin, a man who seems to offer a solution to her issues but has secrets that could prove dangerous to the clan – especially as they suspect him to be a spriggan responsible for the disappearances.

=== Nomad ===
Ivy has been exiled from her home due to the jealousy of her clan's queen, Betony. She's not alone, as the half spriggan, half faery Martin is with her. Together they must find a way to successfully convince the others that they are slowly being poisoned while also trying to figure out the cause for Ivy's strange dreams.

=== Torch ===
Facing treachery and betrayal, Ivy attempts to find a way to unite the magical folk of Cornwall to protect herself, Martin and everyone she loves at the evil piskey queen's hand.
