= Doing It (novel) =

Novel by Melvin Burgess

- First edition cover (with image of condom)
- Author: Melvin Burgess
- Language: English
- Genre: Young adult novel
- Publisher: Andersen Press
- Publication date: 28 April 2003
- Publication place: United Kingdom
- Media type: Print (Hardback & Paperback)
- Pages: 336 pp (first edition, hardback)
- ISBN: 0-14-101803-8 (Paperback)
- OCLC: 56455688

Doing It is a young adult novel by author Melvin Burgess published in 2003. It is a story about the experiences of a group of English teenagers and their discovery of sex. It is told from the point of view of several young men and women as they learn about love, relationships, and loss.

== Plot ==
The plot revolves around a group of British teenagers: Dino, who is the most popular guy at school, and his two best friends, Ben and Jonathon. Dino really likes a beautiful girl named Jackie, the most popular girl in school, but she is unwilling to give him what he wants. This gives Dino the chance to get it from another girl behind Jackie's back. Yet problems arise in Dino's family that cause him to realize sex may not be what he needs. Jonathon likes Deborah, but she is overweight; fearing condemnation from his friends and because of a disgusting looking bump on his penis, he fears showing his true feelings. Ben has been secretly seeing his teacher, Miss Young. He used to love it, but now it overwhelms him. Ben tries to break it off in order to pursue a girl his own age but it causes big trouble for him and Miss Young.

== Reception ==
Reception to the book was generally favourable, with discussion of the subject matter being controversial for some.

In 2003 the author Anne Fine, the Children's Laureate, tried to use her influence to persuade Doing It's publisher to withdraw it on the grounds of obscenity, but it was not withdrawn, and the controversy increased its sales.

== Awards and nominations ==
- Won the Los Angeles Times Book Prize for Young Adult Fiction in 2004
- Named to the New York Public Library Books for the Teenage list

== TV series adaptation ==
The book was adapted as a TV series under the title Life As We Know It, which, although critically acclaimed, was cancelled.
