= Esther Richardson =

British theatre director and script editor (born 1974)

- Born: Esther Richardson; 1974 (age 51–52)
- Occupations: Theatre director, playwright, script editor, screenwriter, film director
- Years active: 1990–present

Esther Richardson (born 1974) is a British theatre director and script editor. She directed an adaptation of Stephen Poliakoff's Breaking the Silence, and A Pair of Pinters. In 2016, she was appointed the artistic director of Pilot Theatre.

== Biography ==
Richardson was born in Manchester. She attended Bristol University, where she studied English. She earned her master's in theatre arts from Goldsmiths, University of London. She began working with the Royal Shakespeare Company as a literary assistant in 2000. She began working on the Theatre Writing Partnership (TWP), which allowed her to discover new play writers. TWP won the Peggy Ramsay award for Momentum in 2004. In 2007, she quit working with TWP, and began working with Derby LIVE, Nottingham Playhouse, Royal and Derngate, the Soho Theatre and the Cast Theater in Doncaster, directing its first show, The Glee Club in 2013.

In 2011, Richardson and Andy Barrett created Skybus, which is a play that took place on a bus running between Derby and the East Midlands Airport. Richardson was the director, and the play takes the form of "eavesdropped" conversations between characters heading to the airport.

Her film, The Cake, was selected for the Moscow International Film Festival, Rushes Soho Shorts and was one of the UK finalists for the Women in Film and Television International Short Film Showcase.

During the European recession, Richardson gathered stories from across Europe in 2013, collecting testimonies about how austerity has impacted people's lives. The project was called All Across Europe and Richardson planned to develop a theatre piece based on what she collected.

In 2016, she was appointed the artistic director of Pilot Theatre.

== Selected stage credits ==
- Noughts and Crosses 2019 UK Tour (director)
- Private Lives (2016) Mercury Theatre (director).
- Blood (2015) Belgrade Theatre (director).
- Dancehall (2015) The Cast in Doncaster (director).
- How to Breathe (2015) Nottingham Playhouse (director).
- Glory Dazed (2014), Right Up Our Street (director).
- The Glee Club (2013) The Cast in Doncaster (director).
- Be My Baby (2011), Derby LIVE (director).
- Skybus (2011) Derby LIVE (director).
- Bones (2010) Fifth Word / Derby LIVE (director).
- Town (2010) Royal & Derngate (director).
- The Dumb Waiter (2010) Derby LIVE (director).
- A Kind of Alaska (2010) Derby LIVE (director).
- Everything Must Go! (2009) Soho Theatre (co-director).
- Wasteland (2009) New Perspectives/Derby LIVE (director).
- Breaking the Silence (2008) Nottingham Playhouse (director).
- I Capuleti e i Monetecchi (2007) Pimlico Opera at The Lowry (director).
- Earl of Mo'Bay (2006) Theatre Writing Partnership (director).
- Satin 'n' Steel (2005) Nottingham Playhouse (director).
- Momentum Project and Festival (2004) Lakeside Arts Centre (director).

== Film work ==
- Wings (2011) Anthem Films (director).
- The Cake (2011) Anthem Films.
