= Dragon's Rock =

1995 novel by Tim Bowler

- First edition
- Author: Tim Bowler
- Language: English
- Genre: Young adult
- Publisher: Oxford University Press
- Publication date: 1995
- Publication place: United Kingdom
- Media type: Print (Paperback)
- Pages: 160
- ISBN: 978-0-19-275036-5

Dragon's Rock is a novel for young adults by British author Tim Bowler, first published in 1995. The Times Educational Supplement described it as a nightmarish chiller.

The events take place in Devon. Toby and Benjamin are opposites and have no affection for each other, so when Benjamin arrives to spend the holidays with Toby's family the stage is set for intense confrontation. Benjamin knows he should not have taken the stone from Dragon's Rock. Ever since then, he has had the same terrifying nightmare of the dragon chasing him, breath like a furnace, roaring in fury, racing faster, faster. He decides to return to Dragon's Rock and replace the stone - maybe then he will be left in peace. But once there, he realises just what a powerful force is at work, and that he is no longer the only person tormented by this fearsome, dangerous beast.
