= River Boy =

1997 young adult novel by Tim Bowler

- First edition
- Author: Tim Bowler
- Cover artist: Jason Friend
- Language: English
- Genre: Young-adult novel, supernatural fiction
- Publisher: Oxford University Press
- Publication date: 1997
- Publication place: United Kingdom
- Media type: Print
- Pages: 135 pp (first edition)
- ISBN: 978-0-19-271756-6
- OCLC: 787800429

River Boy is a young adult novel by Tim Bowler, published by Oxford in 1997. It is the story of a teenage girl facing the prospect of bereavement. Bowler won the annual Carnegie Medal, recognising the year's best children's book by a British subject. River Boy also won the 1999 Angus Book Award.

Margaret K. McElderry Books (Simon & Schuster) published the first U.S. edition in 2000 (ISBN 0-689-82908-6).

== Plot summary ==
Fifteen-year-old Jess, a dedicated swimmer, dotes on her grandfather, a fiercely independent and cantankerous artist. When he falls ill, he insists on returning to the isolated valley where he lived as a child to finish his last painting, a haunting landscape called 'River Boy'. Jess is desperately trying to cope with the knowledge that her grandfather is dying, but she does her best to help him finish the painting that is so important to him.

While exploring the valley, Jess feels a strange presence and sees a mysterious boy in the river, now there, now gone. When she eventually meets the boy, he gives her some surprising advice that leads to the painting being finished against everyone's expectations. In return, he challenges her to join him in swimming down the river from the source to the sea, over forty miles. Jess refuses, saying she must stay with her grandfather, and watches him dive from the waterfall into the river. Soon after, hearing about her grandfather as a boy, she has a sudden revelation, and she swims after the boy to the mouth of the river, where he is waiting for her before finally disappearing. Jess then learns that her grandfather has died peacefully, leaving her his painting of the 'River Boy', which she now realizes is both a landscape and a portrait of the boy she met – a self-portrait.

== Characters ==
- Jessica (Jess), a fifteen-year-old dedicated swimmer
- Grandpa, an artist at the end of his life
- Dad, his son, Jess's father
- Mum, Jess's mother
- Alfred, a garrulous neighbour who knew "Grandpa" when he was young
- The river boy

== Literary significance and reception ==
Susan Cooper described the novel as "a poem, as well as a very moving novel", saying that "A river is a natural metaphor for life and death and Tim Bowler uses it to wonderful effect in this lovely simple story."

Reviews in the national newspapers praised the novel's atmosphere and subject matter:

- "River Boy is strong on mood and atmosphere. It deals with death unpretentiously and unsentimentally, investigating the final stages with dignity and calm." –The Guardian
- "A lyrical story of bereavement that manages not to be effete thanks to credible and courageous characters and a plot that involves mystery and tension." –The Sunday Times
- "The atmosphere is haunting, the sense of the power beyond ourselves, strong and silent, and the mystery of the natural world, woodlands and airy hills and sliding, glittering water are beautifully suggested, as is the strength - oh, subject most rare - of familial love." –The Spectator

In announcing the award of the 1997 Carnegie Medal, the judges said: "This extremely fine novel was a clear winner... River Boy has all the hallmarks of a classic - it deepens with re-reading, and takes the reader on a journey. You are not the same person at the end of this book".

In the U.S., Kirkus Reviews criticised the novel sharply, concluding: "Thoughtful readers will easily predict that the elusive boy is Grandpa and that the death will be timed to coincide with the boy reaching the sea. Readers who do not, though, may tire of the repetitious family dithering over an old man who is tyrannical, emotionally remote, and self-absorbed. Sadly, his decline makes for reading more painful than engrossing."

== See also ==
Awards
Preceded by Junk	Carnegie Medal recipient 1997	Succeeded by Skellig
