= Shadows (novel) =

1999 novel by Tim Bowler

- First edition
- Author: Tim Bowler
- Language: English
- Genre: Young adult
- Publisher: Oxford University Press
- Publication date: 1999
- Publication place: United Kingdom
- Media type: Print (Paperback)
- Pages: 192
- ISBN: 978-0-19-275455-4

Shadows is a 1999 novel written by British author Tim Bowler. It tells the story of Jamie, a 16-year-old living in Ashingford who used to enjoy playing squash. It is revealed in the book that he stopped liking the sport after his family moved to Ashingford.

Jamie is under pressure from his father to succeed. In the competitive world of squash, his dad is determined that Jamie should succeed where he failed. The emotional and physical bullying that Jamie has to endure makes him recoil into himself until he feels backed into a corner and doesn't know where to turn.

But Jamie doesn't share his father's single-minded ambition and is desperate to escape from the verbal and physical abuse that follows when he fails. Then Jamie finds the girl hiding in his shed, and in helping her to escape from her past and the danger that is pursuing her, he is able to put his own problems in perspective and realize that he must come out of the shadows and face up to his father.

The Young Telegraph described the novel as having "lots of pace, action and a couple of shocking twists!"

== Awards ==
- 2000 Angus Book Award
- 2000 Lancashire Children's Book of the Year Award
