= Kathryn Evans (writer) =

British young adult author (born 1969)

- Born: Vivienne Kathryn Hodgkiss; January 1969 (age 57); Portsmouth, England
- Education: Bangor University
- Spouse: Nick Evans (m. 1993)
- Children: 2
- Website: kathrynevans.ink

Vivienne Kathryn Evans (née Hodgkiss; born January 1969) is an English young adult (YA) novelist, public speaker and farmer. Her debut novel More of Me (2016) won the Edinburgh Book Festival's First Book Award and a Crystal Kite Award. Her second novel Beauty Sleep (2019) earned a CrimeFest Award.

== Early life ==
Evans was born and grew up a "Navy kid" in Portsmouth with three siblings. She lost her mother at a young age. Evans graduated with a Bachelor of Arts (BA) in Drama from Bangor University in 1990.

== Career ==
Upon graduating university, Evans moved to Sussex and landed her first job working backstage in the green room of Chichester Festival Theatre. Needing to make ends meet, Evans was simultaneously introduced to the farming industry by her then-future husband Nick. The pair started off growing vegetables at Almodington Nurseries before setting up their own strawberry farm in Sidlesham.

At the recommendation of Natascha Biebow, Evans joined the Society of Children's Book Writers and Illustrators (SCBWI) circa 2002, where she honed her writing skills.

In 2016 via Usborne Books, Evans published her debut young adult (YA) science fiction novel More of Me, about a teenager Teva Webb who replicates herself every birthday, leaving the previous versions of herself stuck at that age. The novel had a U.S. publication in 2017 via Amulet Books (an Abrams Books imprint). More of Me won the 2016 Edinburgh International Book Festival First Book Award and the 2017 Crystal Kite Award in the UK and Ireland category, and was also shortlisted for the 2018 Concorde Book Award.

Evans reunited with Usborne for the publication of her second novel Beauty Sleep, a YA thriller re-telling of Sleeping Beauty about a girl named Laura who wakes up after being frozen for forty years. Beauty Sleep won Best Crime Novel for Young Adults at the 2020 CrimeFest Awards and the Portsmouth Book Award. The novel was also shortlisted for UCLan Publishing's Steam Children's Book Prize in the YA category and Lancashire Book of the Year.

In addition, Evans has worked with the BBC on educational programming. She presented a GCSE English language educational short film with poet Theresa Lola for BBC Bitesize.

== Influences ==
Evans has praised the children's literature of Candy Gourlay, Michael Morpurgo, Jeanne Willis, Catherine Johnson and Matt Haig.

== Personal life ==
At university, Evans met her husband Nick, an agriculture student from a farming background. The couple live on their Sidlesham farm, where they raised their son and daughter in a Georgian style farm house, which Evans designed and built in 2001.

== Bibliography ==
- More of Me (2016)
- Beauty Sleep (2019)

== Accolades ==
Year	Award	Category	Title	Result	Ref
2016	Edinburgh International Book Festival	First Book Award	More of Me	Won	
2017	Crystal Kite Award	UK / Ireland	More of Me	Won	
2018	Concorde Book Award		More of Me	Shortlisted	
2020	STEAM Children's Book Prize	YA	Beauty Sleep	Shortlisted	
2020	Portsmouth Book Award		Beauty Sleep	Won	
2020	CrimeFest Awards	Best Crime Novel for Young Adults	Beauty Sleep	Won	
2020	Lancashire Book of the Year		Beauty Sleep	Shortlisted	
