= Bloodchild (novel) =

2009 novel by Tim Bowler

- 2009 Paperback Edition Cover
- Author: Tim Bowler
- Language: English
- Genre: Young adult
- Publisher: Oxford University Press
- Publication date: 4 June 2009
- Publication place: United Kingdom
- Media type: Print (Paperback)
- Pages: 352
- ISBN: 978-0-19-272871-5
- OCLC: 317251445

Bloodchild is a young adult novel written by British author Tim Bowler. It was originally published in 2008 in the UK. Bloodchild opens with a startling scene of visionary sensation. A boy lies dying in a deserted country lane. As he slips away, he sees almost abstract blocks of colour, as vivid and monumental as a Rothko painting. A deep blue ocean is sucking him under; misty red faces are swirling like shadows around him; and a girl with blue eyes as wide as the ocean is commanding him back to life.

Against all the odds he survives – but with an almost total loss of memory. He does not even know himself. And that is not all. At night he is tormented by visions, in the daytime by hostile strangers. Why does he have so many enemies? And who is the strange child who seems to have a story to tell him? Something has happened in this town, something terrifying. Will can sense it but he can't work out what it was. Perhaps the old Will knew. But that was before the accident. The new Will must search for the answers again – and this is a dangerous task. For the town has a secret and there are those who will do everything in their power to preserve it. Even kill.
