= Susie Hargreaves =

British executive

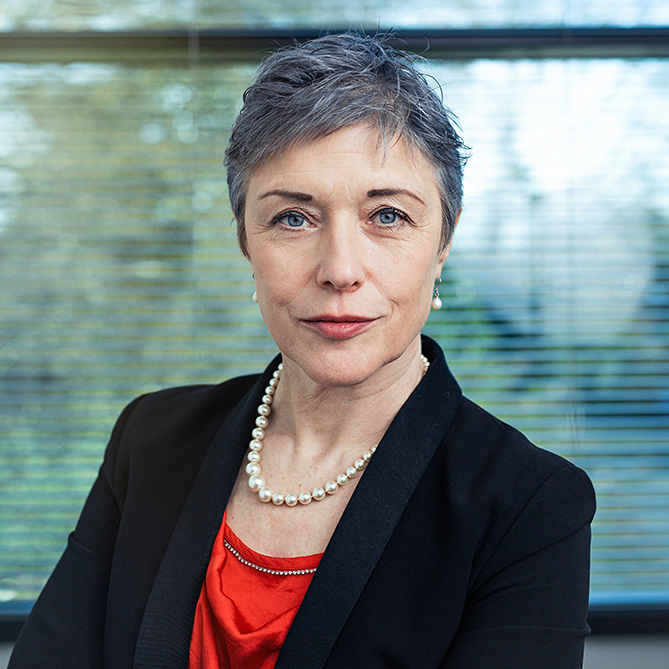

Susie Hargreaves OBE is a British executive who works in the charity sector. She was Chief Executive officer of the Internet Watch Foundation.

== Early life ==
Susan Elizabeth Nuttgens was born in 1962 in Yorkshire to Patrick John Nuttgens, architecture lecturer, and Bridget Badenoch. Her grandfather was stained-glass artist Joseph Edward Nuttgens. Her siblings include Giles Nuttgens, cinematographer, Sandy Nuttgens, composer, and Peg Alexander, broadcaster. Her first marriage, to D N Hargreaves, was in 1983.

Hargreaves was raised in Yorkshire, in a family of nine.

== Career ==
Hargreaves has held a number of executive positions in the arts, including general manager of Red Ladder Theatre Company, deputy director of Watermans Arts Centre, and CEO of Audiences Yorkshire. In 2002, she founded CultureWorks UK, a business development company. In November 2008, she became CEO of the Society of Dyers and Colourists.

Since her appointment in September 2011, she has been CEO of the Internet Watch Foundation, until her departure on July 2024. She is a director of the UK Safer Internet Centre.

== Personal life ==
She is married to actor and director Marcus Romer; they have two children.

== Honours ==
Hargreaves was a finalist for a European Women of Achievement Award in 2004, as Executive of the Year in the 2017 ISPA Awards, and in the 2018 European CEO Awards. In 2006, she was awarded a Clore Leadership Fellowship.

In 2016, she was awarded an OBE for Services to Child Online Protection in the Queen's Birthday Honours.
