= Starseeker =

Novel by Tim Bowler

- First edition
- Author: Tim Bowler
- Language: English
- Genre: Young adult
- Publisher: Oxford University Press
- Publication date: 2002
- Publication place: United Kingdom
- Media type: Print (Paperback)
- Pages: 336
- ISBN: 978-0-19-275591-9
- OCLC: 316424819

Starseeker is a young adult novel written by British author Tim Bowler. It was originally published in 2002 in the UK.

== Characters ==
Luke Stanton is the main character in Starseeker. The book begins with Luke just about to break into Mrs Little's house. He has been threatened and bullied to do this by a group of local boys from his village. In the house, he finds a terrified girl and flees without stealing anything.

== Plot ==
Luke is an extremely gifted pianist, like his father who died two years previously. He is struggling to come to terms with his grief and sense of loss. And when he tries to break into the house again, Mrs Little confronts him. She insists that he help the frightened girl, who is not only blind but also has learning difficulties. Luke's returns to play music for the girl; his playing soothes and calms her. But he becomes aware that Mrs Little kidnapped her and Luke helps to reunite her with her parents. Skin, the leader of the gang, expects Luke to produce valuable items from the house. Skin becomes increasingly violent towards Luke leading to a near fatal attack.
