= The Ghost Behind the Wall =

First edition

The Ghost Behind The Wall is a supernatural fiction novel for young adults by the British author Melvin Burgess, published by Andersen Press in 2000 (ISBN 0862644925). Set in London, it features a boy who pretends to be a ghost in the ventilation system of his home apartment building and discovers a real ghost.

Burgess and The Ghost were a commended runner up (Note: According to CCSU, there were about 160 commendations of two kinds in 49 years from 1954 to 2002, including Burgess and two others (both highly commended) for 2000.) for the annual Carnegie Medal from the Library Association, recognising the year's best children's book by a British subject.

Henry Holt published the first U.S. edition in 2003 (ISBN 0-8050-7149-0).

WorldCat libraries report Korean and Italian-language editions.
