= The Cry of the Wolf =

1990 novel by Melvin Burgess

- First edition cover
- Author: Melvin Burgess
- Language: English
- Genre: Young adult fiction
- Publisher: Andersen Press
- Publication date: 1990
- Publication place: United Kingdom
- Media type: Print
- Pages: 145 p.
- ISBN: 9781849393751
- OCLC: 795757428

The Cry of the Wolf is a novel for children or young adults, written by Melvin Burgess and published by Andersen Press in 1990 (ISBN 1849393753). Set on the island of Great Britain, it features a grey wolf raised partly by humans after learning only a little from its mother before her death, and the hunter who killed her and is obsessed with personally eliminating the species from the wild.

The Cry of the Wolf was Burgess's first novel. He was a highly commended runner up for the annual Carnegie Medal from the Library Association, recognising the year's best children's book by a British subject. (Note: Since 1995 there are usually eight books on the Carnegie shortlist. According to CCSU some runners up through were Commended (from 1955) or Highly Commended (from 1966). There were 29 high commendations in the last 24 years including Burgess and Robert Westall for 1990.)

Tambourine Books published the first United States edition in 1992. Translations have been published in Danish, Dutch, Norwegian, French, Spanish, Lithuanian and Slovenian languages.

== Plot summary ==
Tagline:
Always before, he had been the Hunter. Now he had been the prey and he had survived. He would live. He would kill again.

The book tells the story of a man who tries to kill the last wild wolves in England, and the wolf, raised among humans, who will try to strike back. There are still wolves in England and only a few people know it. One of those people is an obsessive, half-mad, extremely able hunter who was determined to have the honour of killing the last wolf in England. The last wolf cubs are born short minutes before the slaughter begins. The female, called Silver, survives, wounded by The Hunter, only long enough to teach her sole surviving cub a few skills before she too is killed by the man. The cub, Greycub, is reared by Ben and his family and, being a social animal, waits in vain for the sound or scent of a remaining wolf. This is not to be for he is the last wolf in England. Regretfully leaving his human friends, he roams for years searching for a sign of his species, although that is unsuccessful. But what he does find is the Hunter. Greycub tries to kill the Hunter and finally gets to be in the position of the hunter and kills The Hunter.
