= Storm Catchers =

Novel by Tim Bowler

- First edition
- Author: Tim Bowler
- Language: English
- Genre: Young adult
- Publisher: Oxford University Press
- Publication date: 30 June 2001
- Publication place: United Kingdom
- Media type: Print (Paperback)
- Pages: 352
- ISBN: 978-0-19-275445-5

Storm Catchers is a 2001 young adult novel by Tim Bowler about a kidnapping in the middle of a storm.

== Plot ==
The story follows 13-year-old Ella Parnell as she is being kidnapped. Finding a ransom note, her 15-year-old brother, Fin Parnell, sets out to find her as he feels guilty leaving her unprotected with his 3-year-old Brother, Sam Parnell. As the story progresses, the novel changes the narration between Ella, Fin, and Sam.

The story begins on a stormy night in the fictional English village of Polvellan. Fin leaves Ella with Sam to go see his friend Billy Meade's new computer. A stranger then breaks into the home. Ella hears the noise and quickly hides Sam in a cupboard before being kidnapped and taken to a seaside cave. When their parents return, they find a ransom note from the kidnapper that says "Tell a soul and she'll be dead. We'll be in touch." The kidnapper then calls the parents and tells them to send Fin to the fictional Pengrig Lighthouse with $200,000.

Fin then builds a pendulum with a gold ring and some of Ella's hair, which strangely only responds to Sam. The Parnells then row their boat to the largest of the Fury Islands and find Ella and a boy lying on a rock. Ella explains that the boy was so guilty of kidnapping her that he shot himself.

The kidnapper was Ricky Prescott, who Peter Parnell admits was the secret child of an affair with Linda, an employee at a grocery store. He also admits to having a second child named Imogen, who fell off a cliff and died after being scared of Peter while he was painting a portrait. Ricky blamed Peter and decided to kidnap Ella for vengeance.

Peter then admits to being blackmailed for years by Kelman who threatened to expose the affair with photographic evidence if he refused to continue to pay him. Susan, Ella, and Fin are devastated by the news, and the family dynamic between them changes forever. Ricky survives his gunshot wound, the lighthouse collapses into the sea, and Ella kisses Fin on the cheek as they walk back home.

== Characters ==
- Ella Parnell: she was kidnapped in the middle of a storm.
- Fin Parnell: Ella's older brother.
- Sam Parnell: Ella and Fin's little brother, who hallucinates about things.
- Peter Parnell: Sam, Ella, and Fin's dad.
- Susan Parnell: Sam, Ella, and Fin's mother.
- Billy Meade: Fin's best friend.
- Angela Meade: Ella's best friend.
- Mr. Meade: Peter's friend, and Billy and Angela's dad.
- Mrs. Meade: Susan's friend, and Billy and Angela's mum.
- Ricky Prescott: the kidnapper, Imogen's older brother
- Imogen Prescott: Peter Parnell's and Lindy Prescott's daughter, whom Sam hallucinates about
- Lindy Prescott: who Fin's dad has an affair with; mother of Ricky and Imogen
