= Junk (novel) =

1996 novel by Melvin Burgess

- Front cover of first edition
- Author: Melvin Burgess
- Language: English
- Genre: Young adult fiction, realist novel
- Publisher: Andersen Press
- Publication date: 14 November 1996
- Publication place: United Kingdom
- Media type: Print (hardcover & paperback)
- Pages: 278 pp (first edition)
- ISBN: 0-86264-632-4
- OCLC: 37873825
- LC Class: PZ7.B9166 Ju 1996; PZ7.B9166 Sm 1997

Junk, known as Smack in the US, is a realistic novel for young adults, written by British author Melvin Burgess and published in 1996 by Andersen in the UK. Set on the streets of Bristol, England, it features two runaway teenagers who join a group of squatters, where they fall into heroin addiction and embrace anarchism. Both critically and commercially, it is the best received of Burgess' novels. Yet it was unusually controversial at first, criticised negatively for its 'how-to' aspect, or its dark realism, or its moral relativism.

Burgess won the annual Carnegie Medal from the Library Association, recognising the year's outstanding children's book by a British author. For the 70th anniversary of the Medal, in 2007, Junk was named one of the Top 10 winning works, selected by a panel to compose the ballot for a public election of the all-time favourite. Junk also won the Guardian Children's Fiction Prize, a similar award that authors may not win twice; it is the latest of six books to win both awards. (Note: Alternatively, six authors have won the Carnegie Medal for their Guardian Prize-winning books. Professional librarians confer the Carnegie and select the winner from all British children's books. The Guardian newspaper's prize winner is selected by British children's writers, "peers" of the author who has not yet won it, for one children's (age 7+) or young-adult fiction book. Details regarding author and publisher nationality have varied.)

In the US, Henry Holt published the novel in 1997 as Smack — another slang term for heroin.

== Plot summary ==
Junk is told in the first person, with each chapter having a different character narrating. At the beginning of the story, fourteen-year old Gemma Brogan is spending time with David 'Tar' Lawson, a boy of the same age. Tar is a victim of physical abuse at the hands of his father, and — as he later realises — emotional abuse from his mother. Both of his parents are alcoholics. After a particularly violent incident, he decides to run away to Bristol, even though he knows no-one there and has no money. Gemma, despite having loving (albeit strict) parents, also decides to leave home and join Tar in Bristol shortly afterwards.

In Bristol, Tar sleeps rough, interacting regularly only with Skolly, a local newsagent who likes his naive, trusting attitude. Skolly eventually introduces Tar to Richard, an absent-minded, vegan anarchist, who opens up abandoned houses for use as squats. Tar joins Richard and his friends Vonny, an eighteen-year old 'motherly' woman; and her boyfriend Jerry, who is described as a bit useless. Between them, the young adults support Tar financially in order to keep him safe and away from his father, even though it is illegal. Gemma comes 'to visit', intending to stay. Vonny is frustrated by this, as she does not see it as the same situation; they are protecting Tar, but Gemma is unafraid and merely wants a more 'interesting' life. Vonny reluctantly allows Gemma to remain with them, but she insists that both teenagers notify their families from a telephone box that they are safe. Tar is happy with their situation, but Gemma gradually grows more restless, wanting to find some people their own age.

The adults decide after a few weeks that Gemma must return home. Richard holds a 'farewell' party in the abandoned house and, to Vonny's chagrin, he invites Lily and Rob, a couple whom she suspects to be on hard drugs. Gemma is enamoured with Lily from the moment she sees her. The two girls connect instantly, and Lily invites the pair to stay the night with them. Whilst they are there, Lily and Rob encourage Gemma and Tar to smoke heroin with them, and they do, believing that only smoking it will not get them addicted. The pair are subsequently invited to live with Lily and Rob, and they do.

Tar and Gemma live with Lily and Rob for a long time, and in the early days, it is all fun. They have frequent parties, shoplift to feed themselves, and heat their house with fuel from skips. They know all the local squatters and drug-users, becoming particularly close to Sally, another girl their age. However, their heroin-smoking habit quickly turns into long-term addiction. Eventually, the girls become prostitutes to fund their habit.

After an event involving a friend who overdoses at their home, the police arrest Tar. He is sent to a drug rehabilitation centre as an alternative to prison, and receives treatment. Through counselling, he also faces some of the trauma he has endured. He leaves the centre clean, determined to stay off drugs, but he uses heroin almost immediately once he arrives back at the squat.

Lily, who does not work in the massage parlours as Gemma and Sally do, and instead works on the street with the protection of Rob, discovers she is pregnant. She decides to keep the baby, and the five of them vow to get clean. They travel to Wales, with the aim of getting themselves away from heroin and detoxing in a safe environment. However, the trip quickly falls apart. Rob and Sally both smuggle some heroin along with them, Tar hitchhikes back to Bristol on the second day, and Lily discovers Rob's heroin and injects some herself. Gemma initially resists, but once she realises she is the only one still trying to stop using drugs, she starts using them again. They return to Bristol, scared by what they have realised about their addictions: that they truly cannot stop just because they want to.

In time, Lily has the baby and continues to inject heroin whilst the baby is breastfeeding. Meanwhile, Rob starts cottaging himself in public toilets, to fund their habit. Tar has totally changed; the naive, joyful person he once was, has been replaced by someone who lies to and steals from his friends and even from Gemma. Both boys become drug dealers. They have a traumatic experience when they discover a friend and his girlfriend dead after overdosing. However, they do nothing to alert the authorities, instead just stealing their drug stash.

The catalyst comes when Gemma realises that she, too, is pregnant. After a particularly vulnerable moment with Lily, who non-verbally admits she is overwhelmed, Gemma realises that she cannot let the same thing happen to her own baby. She leaves the house in the middle of the night and phones the police, telling them the address of the house and that it is being used to deal drugs. Tar, Rob and Lily are arrested, and Tar takes the rap again, which means he is given a custodial sentence. Meanwhile, Gemma locates Vonny and asks for her help. She allows Vonny to get in touch with her parents, who come to the hospital where she has been admitted with severe withdrawal symptoms. For the first time in three-and-a-half years, the Brogans are reunited with their daughter, who asks to come home.

Gemma returns to live in her hometown drug-free. She gives birth to her daughter Oona, whilst waiting for Tar to come out of prison. However, once he is released, Gemma realises that she no longer feels the same way about Tar, and they end their relationship. The reader learns that Tar ends up forcing his way into Gemma's home and hits her at least once, in a bleak repetition of his own father's behaviour. Gemma remains free of heroin, once she has gone through withdrawal, whereas Tar finds it much more difficult and slips several times, even though he is on methadone. The story ends with Tar having a new girlfriend and seeing Oona occasionally whilst lamenting the life he lost, still craving heroin and still holding onto the hope that Gemma will one day agree to renew their romantic relationship.

== Characters in Junk ==
David 'Tar' Lawson
Fourteen years old at the start of the book. Abused by his father, he is never proud of taking drugs but becomes a heroin addict after discovering that the drug helps him forget the abuse he has endured.
Gemma Brogan
Tar's girlfriend, a rebellious fourteen-year-old who runs away with him. She later becomes a heroin addict and a prostitute.
Richard
An anarchist and left-wing activist who helps Gemma and Tar find somewhere to live. He is in his twenties.
Vonny
An eighteen-year-old anarchist who lives with Richard and Jerry, who ultimately helps Gemma along the path to rehabilitation.
Jerry
Boyfriend of Vonny, lives with Richard and Vonny in the squat.
Lily
A fifteen-year-old heroin addict who takes a liking to Gemma. She grew up in the care system, and it is hinted that she, too, suffered abuse.
Rob
A sixteen-year-old addict boyfriend of Lily. He has had a transient upbringing.
Sally
A good friend of Lily and Rob, also addicted to heroin.
Mr and Mrs Brogan
Gemma's parents.
Mr and Mrs Lawson
Tar's parents.
Skolly
A tobacconist who introduces Tar to Richard. He later pays for sexual services from Gemma, although he does not realise who she is.

== Film, TV or theatrical adaptations ==
Junk has been adapted for the theatre by John Retallack (published by Methuen ISBN 0-413-73840-X). It was also made into a television drama in 1999, as part of the BBC's Scene series for teenagers.

Junk has also been revised as of 2003, with the new title of Smack, and it is often used as a thesis basis for drama (GCSE and A level) examinations.

== See also ==
- Trainspotting, a 1993 novel
- Trainspotting, a 1996 film
- Homelessness in England

== Notes ==
Awards
| Preceded by Northern Lights | Carnegie Medal recipient 1996 | Succeeded by River Boy |
