= Apocalypse (Bowler novel) =

2004 novel by Tim Bowler

- Front cover of paperback edition
- Author: Tim Bowler
- Language: English
- Genre: Young adult
- Publisher: Oxford University Press
- Publication date: October 7, 2004
- Publication place: United Kingdom
- Media type: Print (Paperback)
- Pages: 352 pp
- ISBN: 978-0-19-271926-3
- OCLC: 56643452

Apocalypse is a young adult novel written by British author Tim Bowler. It was originally released in 2004 in the UK. The book deals with teenage Kit trying to find his parents after a storm blows them onto an island in which the local community is hostile and a mysterious man who resembles him in every detail (with the exception of age) in a series of events that turn his world upside down.

It was nominated for the 2004 Carnegie Medal.

== Plot summary ==
The book begins with a group of people (later revealed to be ancestors of the Skaerlanders) attacking a mysterious man on a rock. The man does not flinch as he is beaten to death and thrown off a cliff.

The story then moves into the present, with a family of three on board a yacht on a sailing voyage. The protagonist, Kit, and his parents, Jim and Sarah Warren, are taking a final voyage on their yacht, the Windflower. Once a wealthy family, Kit's father has recently declared bankruptcy, and their yacht will have to be sold when they return. However, they are flung into a nasty storm and lose all their equipment's signal. During which time, Kit picks a small carved boat out of the water and glimpses a man who resembles him in every single way, except age. They run aground on a mysterious island and find it difficult to get their yacht back to sea. Kit goes exploring and sees the man he saw at sea again, as well as a young girl about his age, who quickly disappears. As Kit is exploring he experiences cold spots that he is certain is not the wind. A large wave hits the rocks nearby and washes the man into the sea. Kit is surprised and very confused. He returns to the boat and tells his parents about his findings. They do not believe him, however.

To prove his point(that there are inhabitants of the island), Kit takes them up a mountain nearby. They find a small village over it and go over to it to ask for some help. However, when they arrive, the villagers react with hostility, especially when they notice Kit. They pull out some clubs and charge at them. However, an elderly man with some authority reprimands the leader, Brand, and questions the family. Despite their description of their predicament, the man is unhelpful and contemptuous towards them. He tells them that they have 24 hours of safety, so the family leaves the village and quickly go back to their vessel. They pack up and prepare to leave.

Meanwhile, Kit goes off exploring and notices the girl from the day before again. He chases her and loses her. However, after a bit of searching, he finds her pinned against a rock with a couple of men. The more muscular of the two is attempting to rape her. Kit attacks them and manages to free the girl, who runs away and jumps off a nearby cliff. Kit goes back to his boat and takes his dingy to sail around the island. He finds the girl again and manages to run aground. He meets the girl and follows her to her hideout. She tells him the names of several villagers and that her name is Ula, the two who attacked her were called Uddi and Zak, the old man was called Torin and the eldest woman is called Wyn. She also explains that the island is called Skaer and that it is going to suffer an Apocalypse (come to an end), as everything is dying on the island and the women are all infertile.

Kit returns to his yacht and discovers that the tent is slashed open and his mother and father are both missing. He searches, but cannot find them, so he returns to the nearby village to confront the Islanders. However, he is attacked and chased by the angry Islanders, whose attention is briefly diverted by the same man. Ula, however, appears and provides Kit with enough cover to allow him to escape. He follows her back to her cave. Ula explains to Kit that the Islanders are a religious community who believe themselves to be Torchbearers to God and that they will be saved from the Devil. The Devil is apparently the man Kit keeps seeing. She leaves him for a moment to find his parents. He leaves the cave and goes round to the back of the island, where he sees the man building a cairn and is forced to help. However, they are attacked by the Islanders. Windflower is destroyed by the flaming torches of the Islanders. Kit manages to escape, but is knocked out when he is touched by the strange man on the chest.

Ula manages to get him to the safety of a cave by the time he regains consciousness four days later. She reveals that the man had forced all the islanders to leave. Wyn has stayed behind. Ula and Kit go down to confront her, during which time, Ula reveals that Uddi is Wyn's son and hates Ula because she had killed his brother (who had raped her). She tells Kit that his parents are in the church nearby and are starving to death. He goes up to the church and discovers that she was lying - Uddi and Zak and Brand are in there. The men attack him and manage to pin him down and strip him naked. They then torture him and attempt to get him to tell them where the Devil was. He does not know, so they hang him in a crucifix position against a very rough wall. His back is grazed horribly and his body sags under his own weight. Kit is left to die and Ula is captured. The man, however, releases him and gives him some water. Then he takes Kit and jumps into the water with him to get to a boat. The remaining islanders appear and attack them. The man insists on rowing the boat himself, but is bludgeoned to death by the Islanders. A wave suddenly appears and threatens to drown them all. Kit manages to escape and he and Ula return to shore, with the island now empty.

They climb a hill to get back to the village, when they run into Torin, who had also sheltered in a cave. He insults them while throwing stones at a nearby cairn. He tells Kit that his parents are on a rock nearby and are starving to death. Ula enquires on her own parents. Torin tells her that her mother died at childbirth and that her father was worse than the mother, who lied and concealed his evil from the community. When Ula asks when her father died, Torin responds "Even as you watch," and throws himself to his death. She is filled with grief and buries Torin in a cairn nearby. Kit makes plans to go to the rock and find his parents. They return to the village and Ula gives the weak Kit some food.

Later that night, Kit wakes up and cannot find Ula. Despite his searches, he still cannot find her. However, she quickly returns and explains that she had gone to get his dingy, Splinters. However, she reveals that she cannot come with him, as she wants to be the last Skaerlander to die on the island before the Apocalypse arrives. Kit accepts her decision but notices that the two are suddenly speaking stiffly and awkwardly. Ula then passionately kisses Kit. She helps him out of his clothes, strips her own off and the two make love.

The next day, Kit and Ula part and Kit sets off for the rock that Torin had told him about. He reaches it and finds his parents barely alive. He helps them into the dingy and they set off for land. Two days later, they meet with a fishing boat and are rescued. Kit learns from the Skipper's daughter that the island is now known as Cairn Island. After about a day of rest and a lot of catering to suddenly, they lose all radio contact, just like at the beginning and the story ends with the Apocalypse suddenly happening. However Kit remembers Ula's advice to 'Love as much as you can' and tells himself that together they can stop the apocalypse.

== Reception ==
School Library Journal said the novel is "beautifully written and its themes are intriguing", although they also said that "[t]he unsettling climax may disappoint some readers who prefer rational endings".
