= Marcus Romer =

British actor and director

- Education: Leeds University
- Occupations: Actor, director, playwright, screenwriter
- Years active: 1995–present
- Spouse: Susie Hargreaves

Marcus Romer is a British actor, director and screenwriter.

Romer wrote and directed the 2014 feature film The Knife That Killed Me. He was the artistic director of Pilot Theatre in York, England from 1993 - 2016.

== Directing ==
=== Theatre ===
As a stage director, Romer has won three Manchester Evening News Theatre Awards for productions of Lord of the Flies, and Beautiful Thing (2005). Other directing work includes Sing Yer Heart Out For the Lads, by Roy Williams, Road by Jim Cartwright, Bloodtide by Melvin Burgess, The Beauty Queen of Leenane by Martin McDonagh, Kiss of the Spider Woman by Manuel Puig, Mirad a Boy from Bosnia by Ad de Bont, Rumble Fish by S. E. Hinton, Look Back in Anger by John Osborne, The Elephant Man by Bernard Pomerance, Fungus the Bogeyman by Raymond Briggs, The Twits by Roald Dahl and Looking for JJ by Anne Cassidy which won the TMA award in 2008 for best production for young people.

He has directed work at York Theatre Royal, Lyric Hammersmith, Octagon Theatre, Bolton, the Unicorn, London, Swan Theatre, Worcester, Harrogate Theatre and Oldham Coliseum as well as directing work that has toured to Nottingham Playhouse, West Yorkshire Playhouse, Birmingham Rep, Leicester Haymarket Theatre, Richmond Theatre, London, Artsdepot, Contact Theatre, Liverpool Playhouse, Liverpool Everyman, Haymarket Theatre, Jersey Opera House, Belfast Grand Theatre, Northampton, Sheffield Lyceum, Wakefield Theatre Royal and Winchester Theatre Royal.

Romer directed a 2014 Pilot Theatre version of Antigone adapted as a contemporary street drama by Roy Williams. It premiered on 22 September 2014 at the Derby Theatre and received positive reviews.

In July 2018 Romer co-directed a new production for National Theatre Wales. 'As Long As The Heart Beats' This production formed part of the National Health Service's 70th birthday celebration festival in 2018. Wales Arts Review

== Screen and play writing ==
He is a published playwright; his work includes Rumble Fish, (published by Dramatic Publishing USA), Out of Their Heads, Taken without Consent, (translated as Crash Kids in Germany), Looking for JJ, Fungus the Bogeyman and Bloodtide.
