= Bloodtide (novel) =

1999 novel by Melvin Burgess

- First edition cover (publ. Andersen Press)
- Author: Melvin Burgess
- Publisher: Andersen Press
- Publication date: 1999
- Pages: 371
- ISBN: 9780862648336 (Hardcover)

Bloodtide is a Young Adult novel by Melvin Burgess, first published by Andersen Press Limited in 1999. It is based upon the first part of the Icelandic "Volsunga Saga". It received positive reviews from The Guardian, Kirkus Reviews, and Publishers Weekly, and was followed in 2007 by a sequel, Bloodsong. The book combines science fiction and fantasy,

== Premise ==
The book deals with two warring gangs, named the Volsons and the Connors. Each controls a large portion of London, since the city was blockaded from the outside world. Val, head of the Volsons, wishes for peace between the two and offers his daughter Signy as Conor's wife in order to broker a treaty. His hopes are to unite London and destroy the half-men who occupy the outer rim of London. Once they have been destroyed, he wishes to rise up against the rest of the world and claim it all in the name of the Volson clan. They are opposed by humans, half-men and the Gods, who have recently begun to reappear throughout the world.

== Plot summary ==
This story takes place in the future, where London is a wasteland where two clans war. The two main characters of this story are twins Siggy and Signy. They are the children of Val Volson, leader of the largest territory that was once London. Val wishes for peace and believes the only way to do so is to unite London under one ruler. He offers his daughter Signy as Conor's wife, in order to show his complete commitment to the Treaty. Conor agrees and shows his trust, by visiting the Volson's territory. The visit goes as planned until a banquet is interrupted by an unusual guest. A believed spy, who was strung up by his ankle returns to life and shows it was not a one time trick, as he crashes down head first from thirty or so feet up. After returning to life for the second time he walks up and down the hall. He acknowledges only Siggy and Signy, before plunging a knife deep into a believed to be unbreakable substance. All others try, but no matter how hard they pull, the knife remains within the wall. But one person knows he is the chosen one. Siggy (who wishes for anything but the responsibility of leadership) removes the knife with ease, as his father acknowledges that it was a gift from Odin himself, blessing the treaty in his own way. Conor wishes to have the knife himself and asks Siggy, claiming that as the guest of honour he is entitled. But Siggy refuses, even going so far as to plunge it into wood. But Conor cannot remove it and laughs it off, before leaving with Signy. Signy is disappointed with Siggy for not giving the knife to Conor and heads to Conor's territory annoyed at her brother.

Conor and Signy are happy together, and everything seems to be perfect. Although she is disappointed at being kept in a tower (which Conor assures her is for her own protection), she is still happy because she loves Conor. During a half-man hunt, Signy makes a shocking discovery. The half-men are not what they are reputed to be. After being cornered by a hyena-man, she is informed that Conor wishes to kill her family and claim London for his own. The hyena-man surprises her further by giving her a kitten named Cherry (who is said to have more than one shape), before leaping to the ground and meeting his end by Conor's convoy. After over a year within Conor's territory, her family come to visit. They come (as expected) heavily armed but are caught off guard by Conor's surprise attack. He has betrayed them. Val is killed and the three brothers are forced to surrender. The Volsons are taken to Conor's lair, being disrespected by the guards and townspeople as they go. After a few days of torture, Conor has them left out to die in the half-men lands. Their fate is to be dinner of a berserk pig who roams nearby. First Hadrian is eaten, then Ben. Before long only Siggy remains. Siggy wishes for death, but knows somehow that it is not to be. Signy (following being hamstrung under Conor's orders) discovers that her kitten Cherry is a shapeshifter. She informs her master that Siggy is still alive and in the hopes of pleasing Signy, rushes to his aide. Cherry helps him escape from the pig, before ensuring he is found by Melanie (another pig-woman). Melanie originally intends to sell him as a slave or at worst eat him. But she quickly begins to like Siggy and decides to help him recuperate. She helps his wounds heal and assists in his convalescence. Before long Siggy is back to normal and has struck up a deep friendship with Melanie. Signy has become bitter and twisted and begins to think of nothing but her revenge against Conor. Signy realizes that Conor desperately wants her to have a baby, but she does not want it to be his. Instead, Signy changes shapes with Cherry. She changes into a bird and goes to meet Siggy. She seduces him and has him bear her a child unknowingly. When Signy has the baby, she pretends to have it kidnapped and lets rebel troops clone it. The original baby is named Victor, and the cloned one is named Styr. The cloned one is given special features, making it stronger, faster, and designed for war.

== Reviews ==
Julie Eccleshare, writing in The Guardian, gave the novel a positive review. She wrote that "Melvin Burgess is shocking, and deliberately so, in his descriptions of stomach-turning cruelty, but his carefully constructed retelling of the Nordic Volsunga saga is rich enough in other ways to carry it." Kirkus Reviews summarized its review by saying that the novel was "relentlessly inventive". Publishers Weekly also wrote positively, "Given such a gory framework, Burgess's development of sympathetic characters is as surprising as it is convincing. Rapidly shifting perspectives and deft dialogue expose minds as frighteningly real as growly gangsta rap and as unexpectedly compassionate as unconditional animal love, pivoting on Old Norse gods—or are they constructs of genetic breeding tanks?—who watch but cannot change the weaving of human fate."

== Stage adaptation ==
The novel was adapted for the stage by Marcus Romer for Pilot Theatre in 2004. Writing in The Guardian, Albert Hinkling gave the production a negative review, writing that "Romer's adaptation is pretty starved of poetry, and what there is has mostly been transplanted from Macbeth. Pilot can usually be relied on to provide edgy, aggressive and innovative work, but ultimately, Bloodtide is a great deal of sound and fury signifying nothing."

== Sequel ==
Bloodsong (2007) is the sequel to Bloodtide. Kathryn Hughes of The Guardian gave the book a positive review, writing "By rights none of this should really work as narrative prose, sounding instead more like the jumbled backstory to a particularly complicated computer game. But Burgess has imagined his future world so precisely ... that Bloodsong reads like the most reasonable of realistic fiction."
