= R. J. Anderson =

Canadian writer

Rebecca Joan Anderson
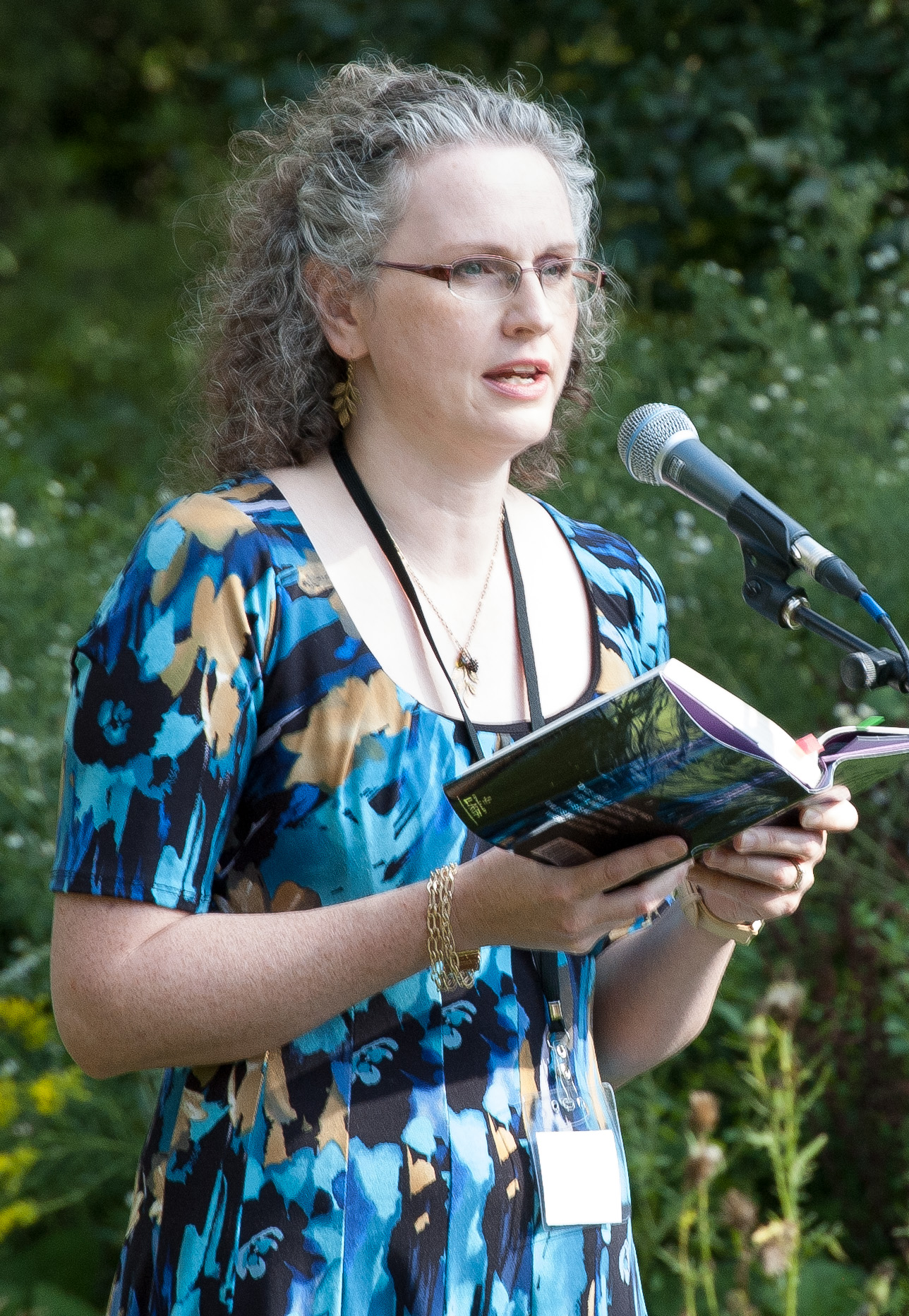
- Anderson reading at the Eden Mills Writers' Festival in 2016
- Born: Kampala, Uganda
- Children: 3
- Writing career
- Notable work: Faery Rebels

Rebecca Joan Anderson is a Canadian author of fantasy and science fiction for children and teens, including the Faery Rebels and Ultraviolet series. Anderson currently lives in Stratford, Ontario.

== Biography ==
Anderson was born in Uganda in 1970, and went to school in New Jersey. Anderson has three older brothers and is the daughter of a preacher. As a child, she would read many books to help her cope with bullying at her school. Her father introduced her to science fiction and fantasy, while her brothers introduced her to comic books. In June 2015, her father was 90; his health was declining due to Alzheimers. She is involved in her church as a pianist and a Bible study teacher. Anderson includes issues of Christian faith in some of her books, though Publishers Weekly states that she "generally handles her material without preaching." She is married and has 3 children.

== Critical responses ==
Kirkus Reviews says that Anderson is "an assured storyteller with a knack for creating memorable characters." Anderson has been praised for both series, with Knife (the first book in the Faery Rebels series) winning the Concorde Book Award in 2011 and nominated for a Carnegie Medal in 2009. In 2011, she was nominated for a Nebula Award for Ultraviolet. Ultraviolet was shortlisted for the Andre Norton Award in 2012. She has been reviewed in CM: Canadian Review of Materials and Canadian Children's Book News. Booklist has called Ultraviolet, a story about a young adult synesthete, "a natural grabber for teens." In 2010 the Canadian Library Association gave Spell Hunter the Honor Book designation.

== Selected works ==
=== Faery Rebels Series ===
- Knife, Orchard (London, England), 2008, published as Spell Hunter, HarperCollins (New York, NY), 2009. Republished 2015 as "Knife" by Enclave Publishing / Third Day Books LLC (Phoenix, AZ)
- Rebel, Orchard (London, England), 2009, published as Wayfarer, HarperTeen (New York, NY), 2010. Republished 2015 as "Rebel" by Enclave Publishing / Third Day Books LLC (Phoenix, AZ)
- Arrow, Orchard (London, England), 2011, ISBN 978-1408312629. First US publication 2016 (same title) by Enclave Publishing / Third Day Books LLC (Phoenix, AZ)

=== Flight and Flame Trilogy ===
- Swift, Orchard (London, England), 2012, ISBN 978-1408312636 First US publication by Enclave Publishing 2020
- Nomad, Orchard (London, England), 2014, ISBN 978-1408326480 First US publication by Enclave Publishing 2021
- Torch, Enclave Publishing (Phoenix, AZ), 2021, ISBN 978-1621841609

=== Ultraviolet Series ===
- Ultraviolet, Carolrhoda Books, 2013, ISBN 978-1467709149
- Quicksilver, Carolrhoda Books, 2013, ISBN 978-0761387992

=== Uncommon Magic Series ===
- A Pocket Full of Murder, Atheneum Books for Young Readers, 2015, ISBN 978-1481437714
- A Little Taste of Poison, Atheneum Books for Young Readers, 2016, ISBN 978-1481437745
