= Mack the Knife (disambiguation) =

"Mack the Knife" is a song composed by Kurt Weill with lyrics by Bertolt Brecht for their music drama The Threepenny Opera.

Mack the Knife may also refer to:

- Mack the Knife (1989 film), a 1989 Netherlands romantic comedy musical film
- Mack the Knife (1995 film), a 1995 Hong Kong comedy-drama film
- Ella in Berlin: Mack the Knife, a 1960 live album by Ella Fitzgerald, containing her famous version of the song with improvised lyrics
- Mack the Knife (musical), an upcoming 2027 musical

== People ==
- Georges Leekens (born 1949), Belgian football manager and former player whose nickname is Mack the Knife (or Long couteau in French)
- Mac the Knife, computer columnist
- John J. Mack (born 1944), former CEO of Credit Suisse First Boston
- Harold Macmillan (1894–1986), known as "Mac the Knife", former British Prime Minister
- Robert McNamara (1916–2009), also known as "Mac the Knife", former U.S. Secretary of Defense
- Ray MacSharry (born 1938), also known as "Mac the Knife", former Táinaiste of Ireland
- Mack "the Knife" Pride, brother of country singer Charley Pride

== Other uses ==
- Mac Tonight, a McDonald's mascot who performs a version of Mack the Knife
- Mack the Knife, a fictional character from Captain Commando
- Mack the Knife, a fictional character from Super Mario RPG
- MTK Global, former boxing management company
