= KMA (art) =

KMA is a collaboration between media artists Kit Monkman and Tom Wexler (UK). KMA's work is primarily focused on the use of projected light to transform spaces and the interactions of people within those spaces.

The idea of people gathering after dark to enact and / or watch a drama or ritual lies inside us and our ancestral history. It is a human response to our fate.

KMA's work seeks to explore this impulse in the context of the modern city. By combining sophisticated interactive technologies with an emotional narrative the work choreographs pedestrian movement; it builds, sustains, and develops complex, physically networked, relations between the body, the individual, the crowd, and the city.

KMA are best known for large scale public interactive works that use projected light and motion tracking technology to create immersive digital 'playgrounds' in existing public spaces. 'Flock' - based on 3 sections of Tchaikovsky's Swan Lake - typifies this approach, and was presented at Trafalgar Square, London as a co-commission by the Institute of Contemporary Arts and The Royal Opera House, Covent Garden.

Congregation (2010) was commissioned to represent the UK Pavilion at the Shanghai World Expo.

== See also ==
- Interactive art
- Media art

== Bibliography ==
- R. Klanten, S. Ehmann, V. Hanschke (2011). “A Touch of Code: Interactive Installations and Experiences”. Gestalten. ISBN 978-3899553314.
- Claire Lowther, Sarah Schultz (2008). "Bright: Architectural Illumination and Light Installations". Frame Publishers. ISBN 978-3-89955-301-7.
- Ekow Eshun, Pamela Jahn (2007). "How Soon Is Now: 60 Years of the Institute of Contemporary Arts". ICA. ISBN 978-1-900300-54-4.
- Chris Woodford, Jon Woodcock. "The Gadget Book: How Really Cool Stuff Works". Dorling Kindersley. ISBN 978-1-4053-2643-8.
- Popat, S.; Palmer, S. (2008) "Embodied Interfaces: Dancing with Digital Sprites", Digital Creativity 19(2), pp. 1–13
- Palmer, S.; Popat, S. (2006) "Dancing in the Streets: The Sensuous Manifold as a Concept for Designing Experience", International Journal of Performance Arts & Digital Media 2(3), pp. 297–314
- Palmer, S. (2006) "A Place to Play - Experimentation and Interactions Between Technology and Performance" . In: White, C.A. & Oddey, A (eds.) "The Potentials of Spaces : International Scenography and Performance for the 21st Century", Bristol: Intellect Books, pp. 105–118. ISBN 978-1-84150-137-6
- Palmer, S. (2006) "Dance and Interactive Scenography: Exploratory approaches to making performance with technology" In: Friedman L. (ed), "Connectivity - 10th Biennial Symposium of Arts and Technology", Connecticut College, New London, CT, USA, pp. 125–136.
- Popat, S.; Palmer, S. (2005) "Creating Common Ground: Dialogues Between Performance and Digital Technologies", International Journal of Performance Arts and Digital Media, 1(1), pp. 47–65.
- Popat, S. (2006). "Invisible Connections: Dance, Choreography and Internet Communities", London & New York: Routledge. ISBN 978-0-415-36475-1
