= Frozen Fire (novel) =

2006 novel by Tim Bowler

Frozen Fire A Novel
- First edition cover
- Author: Tim Bowler
- Language: English
- Genre: Young adult
- Publisher: Oxford University Press
- Publication date: 7 September 2006
- Publication place: United Kingdom
- Media type: Print (hardcover)
- Pages: 384
- ISBN: 978-0-19-271979-9
- OCLC: 70059558

Frozen Fire is a philosophical thriller about the nature of reality by Tim Bowler. The novel was first published in 2006. It introduces a mysterious boy who wants to escape his unhappy life through suicide, and a fifteen-year-old girl who only wants her brother back from wherever he has disappeared to. Frozen Fire has won several awards.

The back of the book reads:

When Dusty gets the phone call from a mysterious boy she knows she can not ignore it. He seems to know something about the disappearance of her brother, Josh, which means that Dusty must find the boy no matter what.

Upon meeting the mysterious boy, Dusty finds him unsettling and uncanny; he appears able to read others' thoughts, experiences extreme physical sensations, and exerts an unusual influence over everyone he encounters.

There is talk in the town of the boy's past. Lynch mobs are out to get him. Dusty must help him and find out what happened to Josh. But when the mob turns on her, it is she, and not the boy, who is in the gravest danger.

== Plot summary ==
The story begins with Dusty, the main character, receiving a mysterious phone call from an anonymous boy who claims to be dying. He soon reveals to her over the phone that he has taken an overdose with the intention of killing himself and that he rang her phone so he would have someone to talk to as he slipped away. At first he gives himself the false name Josh, which is the name of Dusty's brother who went missing a few years previously, leading Dusty to believe that he knows something about his disappearance. Dusty leaves the house to find the dying boy and attempts to save him. She searches around the local park but cannot find him anywhere. Instead she is chased down by three men with two dogs that eventually corner her and assault her. Dusty receives frequent phone calls from the strange boy. He constantly talks about how he is suffering and how he is unable to kill himself. People start to talk about seeing this odd boy around the town. He is described as having snow-white skin and wearing a duffel coat. Stories start to spread about the boy raping a girl in another town and keeping her prisoner and when Dusty asks the boy if this is true he replies by saying he does not know or remember. When the locals start to suspect that Dusty is harbouring the boy, angry mobs go to her house and vandalise her room. When a mob traps the boy and confronts him he takes off his clothes and reveals that he has no genitals, proving that he could not have possibly raped anyone. Eventually the boy drives into a lake and when it is searched the van he drove into the lake is found but his body is not. However, while they are searching the lake, they find the body of Dusty's missing brother Josh. It is also revealed that Josh was the pale boy from another town who raped the girl. Dusty is thrown into turmoil but an observation from Silas, an old miser, reveals that the boy is not, in fact, dead.

== Characters ==
The Boy: Most people in the book call him a boy but he does not actually have a sex, as stated in the book. He seems both sixteen and ageless. According to Dusty's description he has limpid grey eyes tinged with white, snow white skin and snow white hair. He is very tall and lean. He wears a duffel coat unbuttoned and with the hood up, a pale shirt and trousers, and some old scruffy boots. He glows with an eerie luminosity that in spite of his snowy appearance radiates heat. It seems somewhat animal-like, both rousing and repelling her. His beauty comes not from himself or from the primal energy he exudes. What makes him beautiful is hard to pinpoint. Dusty decides it is the strangely feminine quality of his cheekbones and eyes, and his delicate long-fingered hands. He seems to know everything that people are thinking: both their present thoughts and the things that are important to them. He can kill someone or make them pass out with just a wave of his arm. In the book it states that he cannot die. It is insinuated that he did not rape the girl from the other town (it is implied that she made up the story), but rather, he is the manifestation of the guilt of Josh raping of Angelica coming back to set things right before he can move on into the afterlife.

Dusty: Dusty is a fifteen-year-old girl, who has a tendency to get into fights and wander off on her own. She is obsessed with her brother, Josh, who a few years before disappeared. When the boy calls her and seems to know about Josh, she becomes obsessed with finding him so he can tell her about him. She has never been certain of the rumours were true about the boy, and chases after him. Many people tell her she is "just like Josh", which she does not mind, until Angelica tells her that he might actually be guilty; she then tries to become more like the boy.

Josh: Dusty's older brother. He is a wanderer, often leaving for days at a time, and gets into fights more than even Dusty does. He is never actually seen in the book, only mentioned, since he disappeared a few years before the book. Even though Dusty has an over-idealized fantasy version of him, in truth it is quite possible that it was he who committed the rapes, although this is not directly stated. It is implied that he committed suicide by weighing himself down and jumping of a cliff into a lake because he could not handle the guilt. His ghost seems to be The Boy, who has no memories but seems to have to set things right before moving onto the afterlife. He did not rape Loretta, a girl from a different town (as she was said to make the story up), but he did rape Angelica, which gave him great guilt that drove him to suicide.

Dad: Father of Dusty. A dad who is clearly not good at dealing with problems. He is very protective of Dusty, but is one of the weaker characters. He has been head chef of several restaurants.

Mum: Mother of Dusty who ran away after having a breakdown six months after Josh disappeared, though she returns home toward the end of the book.

Angelica: A newcomer to Beckdale who was raped by Josh, though she suspected that The Boy committed it, and seems to be followed by The Boy. She seems to be very unstable, and has a great trust in Dusty. One of the few people who remains friends with Dusty throughout the book. She is another of the weaker of the characters.

Kamalika: Dusty's friend who is very attractive and becomes afraid of Dusty for her encounters with The Boy.

Beam: Another of Dusty's friends who, like Kamalika, loses trust in her when rumours begin to be spread about the boy.

Helen: The woman Dusty's father was dating before her mother came back. Is very similar to Dusty's mother in looks.

Silas: An old hermit who has encountered The Boy, and does not like association with other people, though he seems to have a friend in Dusty.

The Ponytailed Man:(Jethro Haynes) Angelica's stepfather who attempts to reunite with Angelica's mother by trying to track down the boy, who had been accused of her rape. He nearly kills Dusty several times and is the main antagonist of the story. He is followed by two boys (Seth and Saul) who help him track down the boy. Was here because it had happened.

== Awards ==
- 2007 Hull Book Award
- 2007 Highland Book Award
- 2007 Redbridge Book Award
- 2007 Stockport Schools Book Award
- 2008 South Lanarkshire Children's Book Award
- 2009 Southern Schools Book Awards
