= Midget (novel) =

1994 novel by Tim Bowler

- First edition
- Author: Tim Bowler
- Language: English
- Genre: Young adult
- Publisher: Oxford University Press
- Publication date: 7 January 1994
- Publication place: United Kingdom
- Media type: Print (Paperback)
- Pages: 144
- ISBN: 978-0-19-275037-2

Midget is the first novel by British author Tim Bowler, first published in 1994. It is a psychic and psychological thriller. It is set in Leigh-on-Sea.

== Plot ==
Teenage Midget is abnormally small and can barely speak. He has fits as a result of the secret abuse he suffers at the hands of his psychopathic older brother, Seb, who is to outward appearances utterly devoted. Midget dreams of buying a boat and sailing away, but people say it'll take a miracle for that to happen. Midget knows miracles can happen, but sometimes they hurt people who get in the way.

== Reception ==
The Sunday Telegraph described Midget as "a masterly handling of suspense and cold, trickling horror."
