= Tim Bowler =

English author (born 1953)

- Born: 14 November 1953 (age 72); Leigh-on-Sea, Essex, England
- Occupation: Writer
- Writing career
- Genre: Thriller
- Website: www.timbowler.co.uk

Tim Bowler (born 14 November 1953) is an author of books for teenagers and young adults. He won the 1997 Carnegie Medal from the CILIP, recognising the year's best children's book by a British subject, for the novel River Boy.

The Sunday Telegraph has called him "the master of the psychological thriller" and The Independent "one of the truly individual voices in voices in British teenage fiction".

== Biography ==
Bowler was born in Leigh-on-Sea, and educated at the University of East Anglia where he studied Swedish and Scandinavian studies.

His first published novel was Midget (1994), a psychological thriller set in Leigh-on-Sea. This has been followed by several other novels: Dragon's Rock (1995), a thriller set in Devon; River Boy (1997), a story about love and bereavement and winner of the Carnegie Medal; Shadows (1999), a love story; Storm Catchers (2001), a kidnap thriller; Starseeker (2002), an exploration of love, loss and music, also made into a play; Apocalypse (2004), an allegory about the future of mankind; Frozen Fire (2006), a philosophical thriller about the nature of reality; Bloodchild (2008), a story about memory, secrets and betrayal; Buried Thunder (2011), a dark psychological thriller; and Sea of Whispers (2013), a haunting and mysterious story set on the remote island of Mora.

Blade (2008 to 2013) is a series of urban thrillers. Reviewing it for The Bookbag, Jill Murphy wrote, "Nobody in children's writing is producing anything like this. It's electrifying." Some editions in translation (e.g. Germany and Korea) are four books, each comprising two original volumes.

Bowler speaks at conferences, schools, and book festivals and makes regular appearances on radio. He lives in a village in Devon and writes in a small stone outhouse.

- Midget (1994)
- Dragon's Rock (1995)
- River Boy (1997)
- Shadows (1999)
- Storm Catchers (2001)
- Starseeker (2002); US title, Firmament
- Apocalypse (2004)
- Tales from the Dark Side
  - Blood on Snow (2004)
  - Walking with the Dead (2005)
- Frozen Fire (2006)
- Bloodchild (2008)
- Blade
  - Playing Dead (2008)
  - Closing In (2008)
  - Breaking Free (2009)
  - Running Scared (2009)
  - Fighting Back (2009)
  - Mixing It (2010)
  - Cutting Loose (2010)
  - Risking All (2010)
- Buried Thunder (2011)
- Sea of Whispers (2013)
- Night Runner (2014)
- Game Changer (2015)

== Awards ==
- 1995 Midget won the Boekenwelp Award (Belgium)
- 1995 Midget won the New York Library Book of the Teen Age (USA)
- 1997 River Boy won the Carnegie Medal
- 1999 River Boy won the Angus Book Award
- 2000 Shadows won the Angus Book Award
- 2000 Shadows won the Lancashire Children's Book of the Year
- 2002 Storm Catchers won the South Lanarkshire Book Award
- 2002 Storm Catchers won the Stockton Libraries Award
- 2002 Storm Catchers won the Stockport Schools' Book Award
- 2007 Frozen Fire won the Hull Book Award
- 2007 Frozen Fire won the Highland Book Award
- 2007 Frozen Fire won the Redbridge Book Award
- 2007 Frozen Fire won the Stockport Schools Book Award
- 2008 Frozen Fire won the South Lanarkshire Children's Book Award
- 2009 Frozen Fire won the Southern Schools Book Award
