= Sophie Green =

English artist

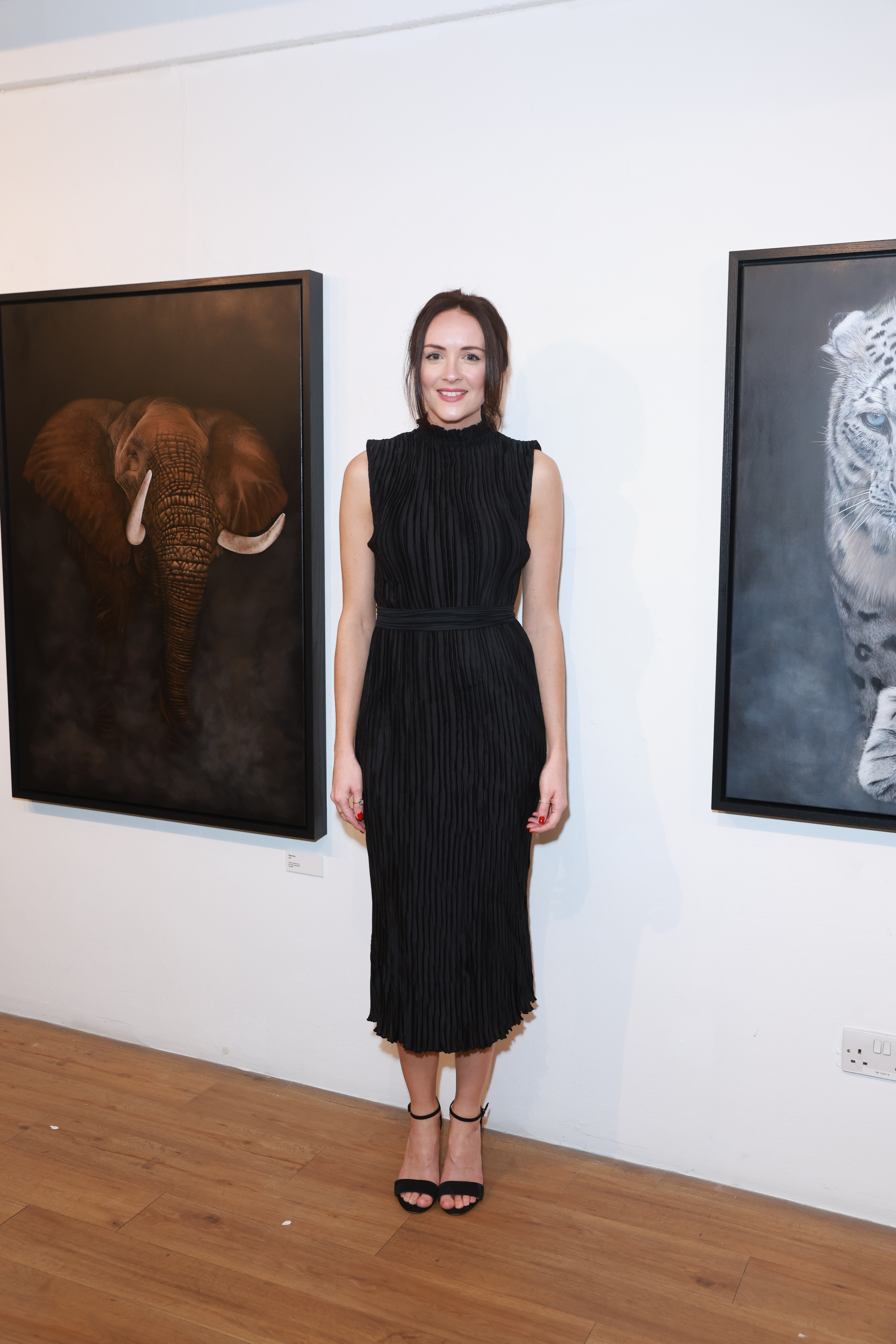
- Green at gallery@oxo, London, 2022
- Born: 28 February 1992 (age 34); East Sussex; South East England
- Education: University of Brighton
- Known for: Contemporary Art; Hyperrealism; Photorealism; Painting
- Website: www.sophiegreenfineart.com

Sophie Green (born 1992) is an English artist known for her hyperrealistic paintings of vulnerable animal species created to raise awareness of environmental and conservation issues. Green is based in East Sussex, South East England.

== Early life ==
Green was born on 28 February 1992 and grew up in Surrey, South East England. As a child, she had selective mutism, an anxiety disorder manifesting in an inability to speak. Green told BBC Radio 4's Woman's Hour that as a child with selective mutism, she sought solace in nature and art. At the age of 19, Green's mother died from cancer. Green went on to study at the University of Brighton, England, where she gained a First Class Bachelor of Arts degree.

In 2018, Green refocused her efforts on fine art after several years of pursuing a career in film and television.

== Art career ==
Green paints hyperrealistic paintings of wildlife and uses art to raise awareness and money for conservation issues. She is an ambassador for The Jane Goodall Institute UK and Helping Rhinos. Green's artwork was displayed at the 2021 United Nations Climate Change Conference in Glasgow. In 2022, Green's painting of an African elephant, 'Broken', sold at auction in New York City for $24,000, all of which she donated to community and wildlife conservation projects in Africa. Green's painting of 'Wounda' the chimpanzee, later sold at auction at the Royal Geographical Society in London for $24,000, which was donated to the Jane Goodall Institute. In 2021, Green went on an expedition to the Arctic, a trip which inspired her 2022 solo exhibition 'Impermanence'; a collection of paintings of some of the most vulnerable species in the world, which exhibited at the Oxo Tower in London.

Green co-hosts the self-development podcast, 'Unquestionable', which was launched in 2023. The podcast has featured guests such as; David Baddiel, Max Joseph, Rosie Jones and Dom Joly.
