= Melvin Burgess =

British writer of children's fiction (born 1954)

Melvin Burgess FRSL
- Born: 25 April 1954 (age 72); Twickenham, London, England
- Occupation: Novelist

Melvin Burgess (born 25 April 1954) is a British writer of children's fiction. He became famous in 1996 with the publication of Junk, about heroin-addicted teenagers on the streets of Bristol. In Britain, Junk became one of the best-known young adult books of the decade. Burgess won the annual Carnegie Medal from the Library Association, recognising the year's best children's book by a British author. For the 10th anniversary in 2007 it was named one of the top ten Medal-winning works, selected by a panel to compose the ballot for a public election of the all-time favourite.

== Early life ==
Burgess was born in the Municipal Borough of Twickenham, Middlesex, England (now administered as part of Greater London).

== Author ==
He completed his first book accepted for publication in his mid-thirties: a novel, The Cry of the Wolf, published by Andersen Press in 1990, which was highly commended (Note: Today there are usually eight books on the Carnegie Medal shortlist. CCSU lists 32 "Highly Commended" runners-up for 1966 to 2002 but only three before 1979 when the distinction became approximately annual. There were 29 "HC" books in 24 years including two in 1990 and two in 1993. Burgess was also a "Commended" runner-up for The Ghost Behind the Wall (2000), a distinction used about 135 times from 1955 to 2002.) by librarians for the Carnegie Medal, which Gillian Cross won for Wolf.

Andersen published all of Burgess' books until the mid-1990s. The Baby and Fly Pie (1993) was another highly commended runner-up for the Carnegie Medal, a distinction that was roughly annual.

Junk won the 1996 Carnegie Medal and also the annual Guardian Children's Fiction Prize judged by a panel of British children's writers, which The Guardian confers only once upon any author. Burgess is one of six authors, all 1967 to 1996, who won the Carnegie Medal for their Guardian Prize-winning books.

Kite (1997) features a boy who hatches a red kite egg.

Burgess again attracted controversy in 2003, with the publication of Doing It, which dealt with teenagers having sex. In the U.S. it was adapted as a television series, Life as We Know It.

In other books such as The Ghost Behind the Wall (2000), Burgess has dealt with less realist and sometimes fantastic themes. Bloodtide (1999) and Bloodsong (2007) are post-apocalypse adaptations of Volsunga Saga.

In 2001 Burgess wrote the novelisation of the film Billy Elliot, based on Lee Hall's screenplay.

He was elected a Fellow of the Royal Society of Literature in 2022.

== Style ==
Polyphony is a narrative technique used in many of his best known novels.

== Works ==
=== Novels ===
- The Cry of the Wolf (Andersen Press, 1990)
- An Angel for May (Andersen, 1992)
- Burning Issy (Andersen, 1992)
- The Baby and Fly Pie (Andersen, 1993)
- Loving April (Andersen, 1995)
- The Earth Giant (Andersen, 1995)
- Junk (Andersen, 1996), also Smack in the U.S. —winner of the Carnegie Medal and Guardian Prize
- Tiger, Tiger (Andersen, 1996)
- Kite (Andersen, 1997)
- The Copper Treasure (A & C Black, 1998)
- Bloodtide (Andersen, 1999)
- Old Bag (Barrington Stoke, 1999)
- The Birdman (Andersen, 2000)
- The Ghost Behind the Wall (Andersen, 2000)
- Billy Elliot (Chicken House Publishing, 2001), a novelisation of the movie Billy Elliot (2000)
- Lady: My Life as a Bitch (Andersen, 2001)
- Doing It (Andersen, 2003)
- Robbers on the Road (Black, 2003)
- Sara's Face (Andersen, 2006)
- Bloodsong (Penguin Books, 2007), a sequel to Bloodtide
- Nicholas Dane (, 2009)
- Kill All Enemies (Puffin Books, 2011)
- The Hit (Chicken House, 2013)
- mays angel (2019)
- Loki (Hodder, 2022)

=== Short fiction ===
- "AD 1000" (in Just in Time: Stories to Mark the Millennium, Puffin, 1999)

== Television work ==
- Autumn 2009 – The Well – BBC Switch/Lime Pictures

== See also ==
- Realism
