= British Fantasy Award for Best Newcomer =

British literary award

- Awarded for: Works over 40,000 words
- Country: United Kingdom
- Presented by: British Fantasy Society
- First award: 1990; 36 years ago
- Most recent winner: Annabel Campbell
- Website: britishfantasysociety.org

The British Fantasy Award for Best Newcomer, also known as the Sydney J. Bounds Award, is a literary award given annually as part of the British Fantasy Awards. The award is named after British author Sydney J. Bounds, whose estate has sponsored the award since 2007.

== History ==
The award was initially presented by the Icarus Society and was known as the Icarus Award. After the Icarus Society dissolved, the award for renamed Best Newcomer. Beginning in 1995, the award was merged into the British Fantasy Special Award. Since 2007, the award has existed as a separate category once again. It is sponsored by the estate of author Sydney J. Bounds and is known as the Sydney J. Bounds Award for Best Newcomer.

== Winners and shortlists ==
* Winners

Original award (1991-1995)
Year	Author	Ref.
1991	Michael Marshall Smith*	
1992	Melanie Tem*	
1992	Julie Akhurst	
1992	Graham Joyce	
1993	Conrad Williams*	
1994	Poppy Z. Brite*	
1995	Maggie Furey*	
1995	Peter Atkins	
1995	Mark Chadbourn	
1995	Terry Goodkind	
1995	Terry Lamsley	

Sydney J. Bounds Award (2007-present)
Year	Author	Work	Publisher	Ref.
2007	Joe Hill*	—	—	
2008	Scott Lynch*	—	—	
2009	Joseph D'Lacey*	Meat	Bloody Books	
2010	Kari Sperring*	Living with Ghosts	DAW Books	
2011	Robert Jackson Bennett*	Mr. Shivers	Orbit Books	
2012	Kameron Hurley*	God's War	Night Shade	
2013	Helen Marshall*	Hair Side, Flesh Side	ChiZine	
2013	Saladin Ahmed	Throne of the Crescent Moon	Gollancz	
2013	Stephen Bacon	Peel Back the Sky	Gray Friar	
2013	Stephen Blackmoore	City of the Lost	DAW Books	
2013	Kim Curran	Shift	Strange Chemistry	
2013	Anne Lyle	The Alchemist of Souls	Angry Robot	
2013	Alison Moore	The Lighthouse	Salt Publishing	
2013	Lou Morgan	Blood and Feathers	Solaris Books	
2013	E. C. Myers	Fair Coin	Pyr	
2013	Molly Tanzer	A Pretty Mouth	Lazy Fascist	
2014	Ann Leckie*	Ancillary Justice	Orbit Books	
2014	Francis Knight	Fade to Black	Orbit Books	
2014	Laura Lam	Pantomime	Strange Chemistry	
2014	Libby McGugan	The Eidolon	Solaris Books	
2014	Emma Newman	Between Two Thorns	Angry Robot	
2014	Samantha Shannon	The Bone Season	Bloomsbury Publishing	
2015	Sarah Lotz*	The Three	Hodder & Stoughton	
2015	Edward Cox	The Relic Guild	Gollancz	
2015	Laura Mauro	"Ptichka"	Horror Uncut: Tales of Social Insecurity and Economic Unease	
2015	Den Patrick	The Boy with the Porcelain Blade	Gollancz	
2015	Jen Williams	The Copper Promise	Headline Publishing Group	
2016	Zen Cho*	Sorcerer to the Crown	Macmillan Publishers	
2016	Becky Chambers	The Long Way to a Small, Angry Planet	Hodder & Stoughton	
2016	Peter Newman	The Vagrant	HarperVoyager	
2016	Steven Poore	The Heir to the North	Kristell Ink	
2016	Marc Turner	When the Heavens Fall	Titan Publishing Group	
2017	Erica L. Satifka*	Stay Crazy	Apex Book Company	
2017	James Bennett	Chasing Embers	Orbit Books	
2017	Daniel Godfrey	New Pompeii	Titan Publishing Group	
2017	Phil Sloman	Becoming David	Hersham Horror	
2017	Martin Owton	Exile	Tickety Boo Press	
2018	Jeannette Ng*	Under the Pendulum Sun	Angry Robot	
2018	R. J. Barker	Age of Assassins	Orbit Books	
2018	S. A. Chakraborty	The City of Brass	HarperVoyager	
2018	Ed McDonald	Blackwing	Orion Publishing Group	
2018	Anna Smith Spark	The Court of Broken Knives	HarperVoyager	
2019	Tasha Suri*	Empire of Sand	Orbit Books	
2019	Tomi Adeyemi	Children of Blood and Bone	Macmillan Children's Books	
2019	Cameron Johnston	The Traitor God	Angry Robot	
2019	R. F. Kuang	The Poppy War	HarperVoyager	
2019	Marian Womack	Lost Objects	Luna Press Publishing	
2019	Micah Yongo	Lost Gods	Angry Robot	
2020	Ta-Nehisi Coates*	The Water Dancer	Penguin Books	
2020	Alix E. Harrow	The Ten Thousand Doors of January	Orbit Books	
2020	Penny Jones	Suffer Little Children	Black Shuck Books	
2020	Tamsyn Muir	Gideon the Ninth	Tordotcom	
2020	Nina Oram	The Joining	Luna Press Publishing	
2021	Kathleen Jennings*	Flyaway	Tordotcom	
2021	Tiffani Angus	Threading the Labyrinth	Unsung Stories	
2021	Dan Coxon	Green Fingers	Black Shuck Books	
2021	Dan Coxon	Only the Broken Remain	Black Shuck Books	
2021	Sean Hogan	Three Mothers, One Father	Black Shuck Books	
2021	Simon Jimenez	The Vanished Birds	Titan Publishing Group	
2021	Rym Kechacha	Dark River	Unsung Stories	
2022	Shelley Parker-Chan*	She Who Became the Sun	Tor Books	
2022	J. T. Greathouse	The Hand of the Sun King	Gollancz	
2022	Ian Green	The Gauntlet and the Fist Beneath	Head of Zeus	
2022	Lorraine Wilson	This is Our Undoing	Luna Press Publishing	
2022	C. A. Yates	We All Have Teeth	Fox Spirit	
2022	Xiran Jay Zhao	Iron Widow	Penguin Teen	
2023	Hiron Ennes*	Leech	Tor Books	
2023	Sunyi Dean	The Book Eaters	Tor Books	
2023	Somto Ihezue	"Whole"	—	
2023	Somto Ihezue	"Like Stars Daring to Shine"	—	
2023	Somto Ihezue	"A Girl is Blood, Spirit and Fire"	—	
2023	Somto Ihezue	"The Carving of War"	—	
2023	Shauna Lawless	The Children of Gods and Fighting Men	Head of Zeus	
2023	Elijah Kinch Spector	Kalyna the Soothsayer	Erewhon Books	
2023	Susan York	Starless	Midnight Street Press	
2023	Susan York	Bible Black	Midnight Street Press	
2024	Teika Marija Smits*	Umbilical	Newcon Press	
2024	Teika Marija Smits*	Waterlore	Black Shuck Books	
2024	Moniquill Blackgoose	To Shape a Dragon's Breath	Del Rey Books	
2024	Vajra Chandrasekera	The Saint of Bright Doors	Tordotcom	
2024	Hannah Kaner	Godkiller	HarperVoyager	
2024	Charlotte Langtree	Fractured: Tales of Flame and Fury	Clarendon House Publications	
2024	Em X. Liu	The Death I Gave Him	Solaris Books	
2025	Frances White*	Voyage of the Damned	Penguin Michael Joseph	
2025	Eliza Chan	Fathomfolk	Orbit Books	
2025	Lyndsey Croal	Limelight and Other Stories	Shortwave Publishing	
2025	L. N. Bayen	Wingspan of Treason	Bregma Publishing	
2025	J. L. Odom	By Blood, By Salt	Azimuth	
2025	Adrian M. Gibson	Mushroom Blues	—	
2026	Annabel Campbell*	The Outcast Mage	Orbit Books	
2026	M. H. Ayinde	A Song of Legends Lost	Orbit Books	
2026	Ana Sun	Futures to Live By	NewCon Press	
2026	M. K. Hardy	The Needfire	Solaris Books	
