= Snake eyes =

Snake eyes is a roll of two dice, with one pip on each die.

Snake Eyes or Snake Eye, may refer to:

== People and characters ==
- Sigurd Snake-Eye (Old Norse: Sigvard Snogøje; 9th century), a legendary Viking king

=== Characters ===
- Snake Eyes (G.I. Joe), a fictional character in the G.I. Joe universe
- Snake Eye, a fictional character from Boogiepop franchise
- Snake Eyes, a character class from Boogiepop franchise
- The Snake Eye (Japanese: ザ・スネークアイ), a fictional character from Ultimate Muscle
- Snake Eye, a fictional character from the 2018 Shatta Wale music video Gringo
- Snake Eyes, a fictional character from the 2017 TV show Valor
- Snake Eye, a fictional character from the 2016 Margaret Atwood novel Hag-Seed
- Baemnun (Snake Eye), a fictional character from the 2015 TV show Last
- Snake Eyes, a playable character in the 2014 videogame Hearthstone
- Snake Eyes Saburota, a fictional character from the 2004 videogame Blood Will Tell
- Snake Eyes, a fictional character from the 1987/8 TV show Saber Rider and the Star Sheriffs
- Snake Eyes, a fictional character from the 1985 film Doin' Time
- Snake-eye, a fictional character from the 1980 film Crazy Crooks
- Snake Eyes, a fictional character from the 1946 animated short film The Great Piggy Bank Robbery
- Snake Eyes, a fictional character from the 1942 film Ice-Capades Revue
- Snake Eyes, a fictional character from the 1931 film Smart Money

== Sports and games ==
- Snake Eyes, a professional wrestling throw
- Snake Eyes, a brand of golf clubs from Golfsmith
- Snake eyes, a 7–10 split in bowling
- Snake eyes, a dice roll in craps
- Snake eyes, or Pa ra, a dice roll in the Tibetan game Sho

== Biology ==
- The visual organs of snakes
- Ophisops, a genus of lizard called the "snake-eye"

== Film ==
- Snake Eyes (1998 film), a crime thriller by Brian De Palma and starring Nicolas Cage
- Snake Eyes (2021 film), an action film based on the G.I. Joe character of the same name
- Dangerous Game (1993 film), or Snake Eyes, by Abel Ferrara
- Snake Eyes, a 1984 pornographic film starring Jerry Butler (actor) who won an award for this film

== Music ==
=== Albums ===
- Snake Eyes, a 2009 album by David Harrow, performing as James Hardway
- Snake Eyes, a 2012 album by Kat Solar
- Snake Eyes, a 2018 album by Bride (band)

==== EPs ====
- Snake Eyes, a 2011 EP by David Tipper
- Snake Eyes, a 2022 EP by 100 Gecs
- Snake Eyes, a 2022 EP by Gluttons (band)

=== Songs ===
- "Snake Eyes", a 1956 song by Zoot Sims-Bob Brookmeyer Quintet from the album Whooeeee
- "Snake Eyes", a 1968 song by Houston Person from the album Soul Dance!
- "Snake Eyes" (The Alan Parsons Project song), a 1980 song by the Alan Parsons Project from the album The Turn of a Friendly Card
- "Snake Eyes", a 1980 song by Grover Washington Jr. from the album Skylarkin'
- "Snake Eyes", a 1987 song by Razor from the album Custom Killing
- "Snake Eye", a 1988 song by AC/DC from the album Blow Up Your Video
- "Snake Eyes", a song by Pain Killer first released on the 1991 album Rituals: Live in Japan
- "Snake Eyes", a 1991 song by Main Source from the album Breaking Atoms
- "Snake Eyes", a 1996 song by The Wedding Present from the album Saturnalia
- "Snake Eye", a 1988 song by AC/DC on the "Heatseeker" single
- "Calder/Snake Eyes", a 1996 song by Wayne Horvitz from the album 4+1 Ensemble
- "Snake Eyes", a song by Ryuichi Sakamoto for the 1998 film Snake Eyes released on the 1999 album BTTB
- "Snake Eyes", a song by Nashville Pussy for the 1998 videogame Rogue Trip: Vacation 2012 released on the 1998 album Let Them Eat Pussy
- "Snake Eyes", a 1999 song by John Paul Jones from the album Zooma
- "Snake Eyes", a 2002 song by Shivaree from the album Rough Dreams
- "Snake Eye", a 2005 song by John Mayall from the album Road Dogs
- "Snake Eyes", a 2008 song by Bigelf from the album Cheat the Gallows
- "Snake Eyes", a 2009 song by Ryan Bingham from the album Roadhouse Sun
- "Snake Eyes", a 2009 song by B-Real from the album Smoke n Mirrors
- "Snake Eyes", a 2010 song by This Is Hell from the album Weight of the World
- "Snake Eyes", a 2012 song by The Milk Carton Kids
- "Snake Eyes", a 2013 song by Amon Amarth from the Under the Influence edition of the album Deceiver of the Gods
- "Snake Eyes", a 2013 song and single by Sworn In from the album The Death Card
- "Snake Eyes", a 2013 song by Winds of Plague from the album Resistance
- "Snake Eyes", a 2015 song by Mumford & Sons from the album Wilder Mind
- "Snake Eyes", a 2016 song and single by Frank Carter and the Rattlesnakes
- "Snake Eyes", a song by Trouble featured on the 2017 album Twin Peaks: Music from the Limited Event Series
- "Snake Eye", a 2019 song by Flotsam and Jetsom from the album The End of Chaos
- "Snake Eyes", a 2022 song by Upon a Burning Body from the album Fury
- "Snake Eyes", a 2026 song by Australian VTuber Hakos Baelz

== Literature ==
- Snake Eyes: Deadgame, an American comic book series in the G.I. Joe franchise
- Snake Eyes, a comics anthology published in the 1990s by Fantagraphics Books
- Snake Eyes, a 1986 short story by Tom Maddox
- Snake Eyes, a 1992 thriller novel by Joyce Carol Oates, writing as Rosamond Smith
- Snake Eyes, a 2006 novel by Max Allan Collins set in the CSI: Crime Scene Investigations series
- Snake Eyes, a 2012 novel by Joseph D'Lacey
- Snake Eyes, a mafia novel by Bill Bonanno and Joseph Pistone

== Television ==
- "Snake Eyes", an episode of the 1958/9 TV show Cannonball
- "Snake Eyes", a 2-part 1977 episode of Quincy, M.E. season 2
- "Snake Eyes", a 1984 episode of The Rousters
- "Snake Eyes", a 1990 episode of Baywatch
- "Snake Eyes", a 2005 episode of Camp Lazlo
- "Snake Eyes", a 2012 episode of Criminal Minds season 7
- "Snake Eyes", a 2013 episode of Witches of East End season 1

== Military ==
- Operation Snake Eyes, a planned 1969 military operation in the Laotian Civil War
- Operation Snake Eyes, a 2005 military operation performed by the U.S. Army's Delta Force against Al-Qaeda in Iraq
- Marine Wing Headquarters Squadron 2 (nicknamed "Snake Eyes"), U.S. Marine Corps
- Mk 82 Snake Eye, a U.S. general-purpose bomb

== Other uses ==
- Snake-eye, a Han dynasty coinage
- Charline von Heyl: Snake Eyes, a 2018 art exhibition of paintings by Charline von Heyl
- "Snake Eyes" (trademarked) or spanner drive, a type of "tamper-resistant" screw drive
- Korail Class 351000, South Korean commuter trains nicknamed "Snake Eyes" ("뱀눈이")

== See also ==
- Snake Eyez, the gaming name of American professional fighting games player Darryl Lewis
- Snake (disambiguation)
- Eye (disambiguation)
