= Zellmer =

Zellmer is a surname.The Zellmer surname evolved as a local name. It is a name for a family that lived in the place named Zell. This place-name can be found in several areas in Germany, but the most well known town of this name is in the region of Freiburg, which is in the Schwarzwald, or the Black Forest, just north of the Swiss border. The place-name has appeared in several countries where the Germanic people had influence.

Notable people with the surname include:

- Eric Zellmer, former guitarist for the band, Gluttons
- Lucas Zellmer (born 1977), German Olympic yacht racer
- Michael Zellmer (born 1977), German Olympic water polo player
- Sandra Zellmer, American lawyer and Professor of Law
- Vicky Zellmer (born 1960), American politician
- Uwe Zellmer, grand-prize winner of the Ludwig-Uhland-Preis literature prize
