= The Jasmine Throne =

2021 novel by Tasha Suri

- First edition
- Author: Tasha Suri
- Audio read by: Shiromi Arserio
- Cover artist: Micah Epstein
- Language: English
- Series: Burning Kingdoms trilogy
- Release number: 1
- Genre: Fantasy
- Publisher: Orbit UK
- Publication date: June 2021
- Media type: Print (hardcover, paperback), e-Book, Audiobook
- Pages: 576
- ISBN: 9780759554160
- Followed by: The Oleander Sword

The Jasmine Throne is a fantasy novel by British author Tasha Suri published by Orbit UK in 2021. An epic fantasy set in a world inspired by ancient India, it is the first volume in the Burning Kingdoms trilogy.

It won the World Fantasy Award for Best Novel in 2022.

== Plot summary ==
The Parijatdvipan Empire rules over several vassal states, including Ahiranya. Ahiranya’s native language, religion, and culture have been suppressed; this has led to instability and rebellion. A new disease called the rot, which causes plants to sprout from one's body, is leading to further stress.

Within an Ahiranyi temple called the Hirana, there is a source of power known as the deathless waters. By passing through the waters once, twice, or thrice, Ahiranyi temple children risked their lives in exchange for gaining magical powers related to the yaksa, nature spirits. During the Parijati conquest, some of the Ahiranyi elders betrayed their companions; most of the elders and temple children were massacred.

Prince Aditya leaves the traditional Parijati religion to become a priest of the nameless god, a religion belonging to the region of Alor. His brother Chandra ascends to the throne. Chandra is a religious fanatic and attempts to impose his beliefs on the empire. Malini, Emperor Chandra’s sister, refuses to sacrifice herself in a religious ritual and is exiled. A group of dissidents, led by Prince Rao of Alor, attempts to free Malini and place Aditya on the throne.

Malini is imprisoned in the Hirana. Priya is a former temple child who survived the massacre. She is a servant in the household of General Vikram, the Parijati Regent of Ahiranya, and his wife Bhumika. Priya saves Malini from an assassination attempt and becomes her personal maid.

Ashok, the leader of a group of resistance fighters, is Priya’s older brother and another surviving temple child. He and his rebels hope to violently overthrow the occupying government. Ashok and his rebels drink their last supply from the deathless waters; they gain powers, but will die if they cannot replenish their store from the Hirana. Bhumika reveals herself as a surviving temple child and has Vikram executed, consolidating power for herself.

In exchange for independence for Ahiranya, Priya agrees to help Malini escape. Before they flee the Hirana, Priya seals the path to the deathless waters so that Ashok cannot reach them. Malini and Priya flee toward the city-state of Srugna and begin a romance. Bhumika, Priya, and Malini meet with Rao and Aditya. Priya agrees to save Ashok and his rebels on the condition that they recognize Bhumika as leader. Malini remains with her brother as the others return to Ahiranya.

Priya’s group returns to the Hirana. She and Bhumika become thrice-born, but Ashok dies in the attempt. Bhumika and Priya become elders, reinstating the traditional Ahiranyi religion.

Emperor Chandra sends a battalion to attack Aditya. The weak-willed Aditya is unwilling to sacrifice his soldiers, but Malini takes control, burning the temple of the nameless god to the ground. This kills all of Chandra’s soldiers, as well as some of Aditya’s priests. Malini claims power and is proclaimed as Empress.

== Reception and awards ==
A review in Locus praised the book's morally grey characters and its "intense, vivid atmosphere". Describing the novel as "lush, evocative, richly characterised, emotionally dense", Tor.com said that its main theme was the nature of power and its cost. The relationship between its female protagonists Malini and Priya was praised by Library Journal, which added that fans on Twitter and BookTok dubbed it part of the "Sapphic Saffron Trifecta" along with The Unbroken by C.L. Clark and She Who Became the Sun by Shelley Parker-Chan.

The Burning Kingdoms Trilogy was a finalist for the 2025 Hugo Award for Best Series.
