= Shauna Lawless =

Northern Irish writer

- Born: 1986 (age 39–40)
- Education: Ulster University
- Years active: 2022–present
- Spouse: Gerard Lawless
- Website: shaunalawless.com

Shauna Lawless (born 1986) is a fantasy author from County Down. Her debut novel The Children of Gods and Fighting Men (2022), the first in her Gael Song historical fantasy trilogy, was nominated for a British Fantasy Award. Lawless won a Chrysalis Award at the 2025 European Science Fiction Society Awards.

== Early life ==
Lawless spent her early childhood in England before her family returned to County Down when she was 9. She attended St Mary's Primary School in Newcastle and then Assumption Grammar School in Ballynahinch. She graduated with a degree in Accountancy from Ulster University.

== Career ==
Before going into professional writing, Lawless worked in finance. She has named Hilary Mantel, George R. R. Martin, and Jane Austen as her favourite authors. She has also cited an admiration for Christopher Buehlman, Fonda Lee, Nicholas Binge, Mark Lawrence, Anthony Ryan, Tasha Suri, Hannah Kaner, Ken Liu, and Christopher Ruocchio.

Via Head of Zeus (a Bloomsbury Publishing imprint), Lawless published her debut historical fantasy novel The Children of Gods and Fighting Men in 2022, which formed part of her Gael Song trilogy, set in the 10th century amid the Viking age. Lawless had become fascinated with Irish mythology at a young age and recalls discovering Lady Gregory's Of Gods and Fighting Men. The Children of Gods and Fighting Men was nominated for the British Fantasy Award for Best Newcomer. The second book in the series, titled The Words of Kings and Prophets, was published in 2023, followed by the third and final installment The Land of the Living and the Dead in 2024. In the interim she released two Gael Song novellas: Dreams of Fire and Dreams of Sorrow. She returned to the Gael Song saga in 2025 with Daughter of the Otherworld, the first in a duology set in the same universe. The second book, Son of the Serpent, was released in 2026.

Lawless won a Chrysalis Award at the European Science Fiction Awards Awards in 2025.

== Personal life ==
Lawless lives in Castlewellan with her family.

== Works ==
=== Gael Song ===
==== Gael Song trilogy ====
- The Children of Gods and Fighting Men (2022)
- The Words of Kings and Prophets (2023)
- The Land of the Living and the Dead (2024)

==== Novellas ====
- Dreams of Fire (#0.5)
- Dreams of Sorrow (#2.5)
- Dreams of Chaos (#0.6)

==== Gael Song: Era II ====
- Daughter of the Otherworld (2025)
- Son of the Serpent (2026)

== Awards and nominations ==
Year	Award	Category	Title	Result	Ref.
2023	British Fantasy Awards	Best Newcomer	The Children of Gods and Fighting Men	Shortlisted	
2025	European Science Fiction Society Awards	Chrysalis Award		Won	
