= Rockstar (Dolly Parton album) =

2023 studio album by Dolly Parton

- One of four covers to Rockstar (Note: The others feature Parton in similar outfits mounting a motorcycle, holding an electric guitar, or posing with a leather eye patch in the shape of a star. Deluxe edition adds her wearing sunglasses and a black logo.)

Studio album by Dolly Parton
- Released: November 17, 2023
- Genres: Rock; country pop
- Length: 141:18
- Labels: Butterfly; Big Machine
- Producers: Dolly Parton; Kent Wells

Dolly Parton chronology
Diamonds & Rhinestones: The Greatest Hits Collection (2022)	Rockstar (2023)	Smoky Mountain DNA: Family, Faith and Fables (2024)

Singles from Rockstar
- 1. "World on Fire" Released: May 11, 2023; 2. "Magic Man" Released: June 15, 2023; 3. "Bygones" Released: June 16, 2023; 4. "We Are the Champions" / "We Will Rock You" Released: July 21, 2023; 5. "Let It Be" Released: August 18, 2023; 6. "What's Up?" Released: September 22, 2023; 7. "Wrecking Ball" Released: October 20, 2023

Rockstar is the forty-ninth and final studio album by the American singer-songwriter Dolly Parton. It was released on November 17, 2023, by Butterfly Records and Big Machine Records. The album is a collaborative project with a variety of rock musicians, marking Parton's only album-length foray into the genre. Released over two years before her death in 2026, it marked the final studio album Parton created in her lifetime.

The lead single "World on Fire" was released on May 11, 2023, with the singles "Magic Man" featuring Ann Wilson, "Bygones" featuring Rob Halford, Nikki Sixx and John 5, "We Are the Champions"/"We Will Rock You", Parton's version of "Let It Be" featuring surviving Beatles members Paul McCartney and Ringo Starr, and Parton's version of "What's Up?" featuring Linda Perry following over the next five months. Parton performed a duet of "Wrecking Ball" with Miley Cyrus on New Year's Eve 2022, and performed "World on Fire" at the 58th Academy of Country Music Awards in May 2023.

Rockstar received generally positive reviews from music critics. Commercially, it debuted at number three on the Billboard 200, selling 128,000 equivalent album units in its first week. It became Parton's highest-charting studio album as well as topping the Country and Rock Albums charts.

== Recording and release ==
Parton was nominated for the Rock and Roll Hall of Fame in 2022 and initially declined the honor, as her background was in country music, not rock. In response, she declared her intention to record an album of rock covers with a host of musical guests from that genre to justify her inclusion. She performed "Rockin' It", an original song, at the Hall of Fame induction ceremony.

Parton reached out to a variety of dream collaborators over the course of several months, including several of the artists she had performed with at the Hall of Fame ceremony, such as fellow 2022 inductees Pat Benatar, Neil Giraldo, Simon Le Bon and Rob Halford, along with Pink, Brandi Carlile and Sheryl Crow. Parton officially announced the recording on The Tonight Show with Jimmy Fallon on November 30. She revealed the album release on the January 17, 2023, episode of The View, and previewed the track "World on Fire" on May 11.

British singer and guitarist Peter Frampton was recruited into recording after a mutual friend performed backing vocals with American singer Steven Tyler on the album. He immediately called his manager and the next day, spoke with producer Kent Wells to perform a guitar solo and also vocals on a second track. Parton pursued Mick Jagger to provide vocals on her cover of "Satisfaction", but he had a scheduling conflict and was unable to contribute. Parton also hoped to reunite Led Zeppelin's Jimmy Page and Robert Plant for her new cover of "Stairway to Heaven", a favorite of her husband Carl Dean, but was unsuccessful.

Parton's "favorite collaborator" was fellow country musician Chris Stapleton, who stepped in when Bob Seger was unable to join Parton on "Night Moves" due to experiencing problems with his voice. Prior to the reveal of the official track listing, Parton had performed "Wrecking Ball" with her goddaughter Miley Cyrus at her New Year's Eve show. Parton performed the album's lead single "World on Fire" for the first time at the 58th Academy of Country Music Awards on May 11, 2023.

== Singles ==
Lead single "World on Fire" was released on May 11, 2023. After 55 years as a recording artist, Parton had her first release hit a rock-themed chart, with "World on Fire" debuting at number 13 on Billboard's Rock Digital Song Sales on May 20, 2023. It went on to peak at number 1 a week later. The second single "Magic Man" featuring Ann Wilson was released on June 15, 2023. The third single, "Bygones", featuring Rob Halford with guests Nikki Sixx and John 5, was released the following day. The fourth single, "We Are the Champions"/"We Will Rock You" was released on July 21, 2023.

Parton's version of "Let It Be", featuring surviving Beatles members Paul McCartney and Ringo Starr, was released as the album's fifth single on August 18, 2023. The sixth single, Parton's version of "What's Up?" featuring Linda Perry, was released on September 22, 2023. The seventh single, Parton's version of "Wrecking Ball" featuring Miley Cyrus, was released on October 20, 2023.

== Commercial performance ==
Rockstar earned 128,000 album-equivalent units, with 118,500 in album sales, in its debut week, making it Parton's most successful debut ever. It was also her first album to top Billboard's Top Album Sales chart in the chart's 32-year existence. It ranked No. 3 on the US Billboard 200 list—the highest for any Parton's album—and also was No. 1 on both the Country and Rock & Alternative lists.

== Critical reception ==
Professional ratings
Aggregate scores
Source	Rating
Metacritic	65/100
Review scores
Source	Rating
AllMusic	3.5/5 stars
American Songwriter	5/5 stars
Classic Rock	5/5 stars
The Guardian	2/5 stars
The Independent	3/5 stars
Mojo	3/5 stars
Pitchfork	5.2/10
PopMatters	7/10
The Skinny	3/5 stars
Slant Magazine	3/5 stars

Rockstar received generally favorable reviews, holding a Metacritic score of 65/100, based on 18 reviews. The album was praised for the ambitious scope of Dolly Parton's tribute to rock and roll but critics were divided on its execution, particularly regarding the balance between original material and covers of classic rock songs.

Several critics responded positively to Rockstar's grand concept. American Songwriter and Classic Rock both awarded the album a perfect score, with the latter calling it "monumentally hideous, yet strangely glorious", emphasizing its extravagant nature and how it's a "show for all ages". Rolling Stone praised Parton's "warmth and infectious enthusiasm", noting her collaborations with major rock icons added a celebratory feel to the record. However, Dolan also pointed out that while her new material was solid, it often failed to stand out among the well-known rock classics featured on the album.

Other critics were more divided in their assessments. The Independent and AllMusic gave the album moderately positive ratings, acknowledging Parton's efforts to explore rock while suggesting that some tracks felt redundant or unnecessary. The Guardian was more critical, arguing that Rockstar missed an opportunity to reinterpret classic songs in a unique way, instead choosing to remain faithful to the originals without adding much innovation. The review noted that while Parton's voice remained strong, the album often felt more like an elaborate homage than a reinvention of the genre. Pitchfork, in one of the more negative reviews, rated the album 5.2/10, describing it as a "dense and star-studded collection that sounds like the millennium's most expensive karaoke party". The review criticized some of the covers for being too polished and overly reliant on their original arrangements rather than offering fresh takes.

== Track listing ==
Disc 1
No.	Title	Writer(s)	Featured artist(s)	Length
1.	"Rockstar"	Dolly Parton; Brock Woodcock	Richie Sambora^{[g]}	4:36
2.	"World on Fire"	Parton		4:21
3.	"Every Breath You Take"	Sting	Sting	4:22
4.	"Open Arms"	Jonathan Cain; Steve Perry	Steve Perry	3:16
5.	"Magic Man (Carl Version)"	Ann Wilson; Nancy Wilson	Ann Wilson; Howard Leese^{[g]}	5:02
6.	"Long As I Can See the Light"	John Fogerty	John Fogerty	4:11
7.	"Either Or"	Parton; Kent Wells	Kid Rock	4:20
8.	"I Want You Back"	Parton; Wells	Steven Tyler; Warren Haynes^{[g]}	5:03
9.	"What Has Rock and Roll Ever Done for You"	Jennifer Condos; Kevin Dukes; Stevie Nicks	Stevie Nicks; Waddy Wachtel^{[g]}	5:01
10.	"Purple Rain"	Prince Nelson		7:51
11.	"Baby, I Love Your Way"	Peter Frampton	Peter Frampton	4:58
12.	"I Hate Myself for Loving You"	Desmond Child; Joan Jett	Joan Jett and the Blackhearts	4:07
13.	"Night Moves"	Bob Seger	Chris Stapleton	5:39
14.	"Wrecking Ball"	Lukasz Gottwald; Kiyanu Kim; Maureen McDonald; Stephan Moccio; Sacha Skarbek; Henry Walter	Miley Cyrus	3:55
15.	"(I Can't Get No) Satisfaction"	Jagger–Richards	Pink; Brandi Carlile	3:53
Total length:				70:48

Disc 2
No.	Title	Writer(s)	Featured artist(s)	Length
16.	"Keep on Loving You"	Kevin Cronin	Kevin Cronin	3:26
17.	"Heart of Glass"	Debbie Harry; Chris Stein	Debbie Harry	3:41
18.	"Don't Let the Sun Go Down on Me"	Elton John; Bernie Taupin	Elton John	5:42
19.	"Tried to Rock and Roll Me"	Parton; Wells	Melissa Etheridge	3:49
20.	"Stairway to Heaven"	Jimmy Page; Robert Plant	Lizzo	7:48
21.	"We Are the Champions" / "We Will Rock You"	Freddie Mercury; Brian May		3:51
22.	"Bygones"	Parton; Wells	Rob Halford; Nikki Sixx^{[g]}; John 5^{[g]}	3:59
23.	"My Blue Tears"	Parton	Simon Le Bon	4:03
24.	"What's Up?"	Linda Perry	Linda Perry	4:38
25.	"You're No Good"	Clint Ballard Jr.	Emmylou Harris; Sheryl Crow	3:14
26.	"Heartbreaker"	Geoff Gill; Cliff Wade	Pat Benatar; Neil Giraldo	3:39
27.	"Bittersweet"	Parton	Michael McDonald	4:03
28.	"I Dreamed About Elvis"	Parton	Ronnie McDowell; The Jordanaires^{[g]}	3:38
29.	"Let It Be"	Lennon–McCartney	Paul McCartney; Ringo Starr; Peter Frampton^{[g]}; Mick Fleetwood^{[g]}	4:27
30.	"Free Bird"	Allen Collins; Ronnie Van Zant	Lynyrd Skynyrd; Artimus Pyle Band^{[g]}	10:45
Total length:				70:59

Download exclusive version (official store) – bonus tracks
No.	Title	Writer(s)	Featured artist(s)	Length
31.	"Two Tickets to Paradise"	Eddie Money		4:42
32.	"Jolene"	Parton	Måneskin	3:12

HSN limited edition
No.	Title	Writer(s)	Length
31.	"Mama Never Said"	Parton	3:47
32.	"Hit Me with Your Best Shot"	Eddie Schwartz	2:58
33.	"Rockin' It" (live)	Parton	3:06

Vols edition – bonus track
No.	Title	Writer(s)	Length
31.	"Rocky Top" (live)	Felice and Boudleaux Bryant	2:55

Deluxe edition
No.	Title	Writer(s)	Featured artist(s)	Length
31.	"Rockin' It" (live)	Parton		3:06
32.	"Hit Me with Your Best Shot"	Schwartz		2:58
33.	"Mama Never Said"	Parton		3:47
34.	"Two Tickets to Paradise"	Money		4:42
35.	"Jolene"	Parton	Måneskin	3:12
36.	"Stay out of My Bedroom"	Parton		3:35
37.	"Bridge over Troubled Water"	Paul Simon		5:06
38.	"The Entertainer"	Billy Joel		4:34
39.	"Sweet Dreams (Are Made of This)"	Annie Lennox; Dave Stewart		4:34

=== Notes ===
- ^{^[g]} signifies a special guest artist.
- CD release contains two discs, divided tracks 1–15 and tracks 16–30.
- Vinyl release contains four discs, divided tracks 1–8, tracks 9–15, tracks 16–23, and tracks 24–30.

== Personnel ==
Musicians

- Dolly Parton – vocals
- Kent Wells – acoustic guitar (tracks 1–3, 5, 6, 10, 13, 16, 19, 23, 24, 27, 28, 30), background vocals (2, 3, 6, 10–12, 15, 16, 22, 24), programming (2), electric guitar (3, 8, 16, 18, 20, 22, 25, 28), percussion (5, 16–18, 27, 28), clapping (15), additional vocals (22)
- Christine Winslow – background vocals (1, 3, 5–7, 11, 12, 14–17, 19, 22, 24–26, 30), additional vocals (1), clapping (15)
- Richard Dennison – additional vocals (1), background vocals (2, 10, 13, 18, 20, 21, 23, 27, 29)
- Gary Lunn – bass (1, 2, 6, 8–10, 13–17, 19–26, 29)
- Nir Z – drums (1, 2, 4, 9–14, 16, 17, 20–22, 24, 26), percussion (2, 16, 17, 29)
- Jerry McPherson – electric guitar (1, 2, 5, 6, 8–10, 12–27, 29)
- Rob McNelley – electric guitar (1, 2, 5, 8–10, 12–15, 18–23, 25, 27, 29)
- Dane Bryant – Hammond B3 (1, 2, 6, 9, 13, 17, 18, 24), synthesizer (2, 12, 14, 17, 22, 27), strings (2, 14, 20–22, 29), synth pads (5), piano (13, 20), keyboards (16, 26, 28), Moog bass (20); harpsichord, Mellotron, timpani (21); Wurlitzer organ (29)
- Mike Rojas – Wurlitzer organ (1, 17, 18, 24, 27), piano (2, 5, 6, 14, 18, 21, 22, 27), Mellotron (2), keyboards (3, 4, 7, 8, 10, 15, 19, 23, 25), Hammond B3 (12, 29), synthesizer (17); electronic percussion, French horn, percussion (18); accordion (23, 24)
- Richie Sambora – background vocals, electric guitar, vocal programming (1)
- Rachel Edge – background vocals (2, 6, 11, 12, 14, 26), additional vocals (22)
- Jennifer O'Brien – background vocals (2, 10, 13, 18, 20, 21, 23, 27, 29)
- Vicki Hampton – background vocals (2, 10, 13, 18, 20, 21, 23, 27, 29)
- Joel McKenney – background vocals (2), piano (3), additional vocals (22)
- Jimmy Mattingly – cello, viola, violin (2, 20–22, 29)
- Alex Wells – background vocals (2), additional vocals (22)
- Cody Howell – background vocals (2), additional vocals (22)
- Emily Blackbird – background vocals (2), additional vocals (22)
- Ethan Kuntz – background vocals (2), additional vocals (22)
- Hunter Garrett – background vocals (2), additional vocals (22)
- Kat Elfman – background vocals (2), additional vocals (22)
- Kevin Willis – background vocals (2), additional vocals (22)
- Olivia Steele – background vocals (2), additional vocals (22)
- Scott Bass – background vocals (2), additional vocals (22)
- Stephanie Howell – background vocals (2), additional vocals (22)
- Mark Needham – programming (2, 21)
- Jimmie Lee Sloas – bass (3, 4, 7, 12)
- Jerry Roe – drums (3, 7), percussion (3)
- Derek Wells – electric guitar (3, 7)
- Elton John – piano, vocals (3)
- Kim Keys – background vocals (4, 7, 8, 17, 19, 25, 30)
- Chris Rodriguez – background vocals (4, 8)
- Miles McPherson – drums (5, 6, 8, 15, 18, 19, 23, 27), percussion (23, 27)
- Steve Mackey – bass (5, 11, 18, 27)
- Howard Leese – acoustic guitar, electric guitar (5)
- Mark Douthit – saxophone (6), horn arrangement (9)
- Adam Shoenfeld – electric guitar (6)
- Shane Fogerty – electric guitar (6)
- Jim Hoke – horn arrangement (7, 8, 18, 28), saxophone (7, 18, 28), horns (8), whistle (23), trumpet (28)
- Mica Roberts – background vocals (7, 30)
- Emmanuel Echem – trumpet (7)
- Warren Haynes – electric guitar (8)
- Waddy Wachtel – electric guitar (9)
- Adam Lester – acoustic guitar (11)
- Peter Frampton – electric guitar (11, 29), acoustic guitar (11)
- Rob Arthur – keyboards (11)
- Beef – clapping (12)
- Joan Jett – clapping, electric guitar (12)
- Annie DiBlasi – clapping (12)
- Dougie Needles – clapping, electric guitar (12)
- Joe Vannelli – Hammond B3 (16)
- Jennifer Kummer – French horn (18)
- Patrick Walle – French horn (18)
- Roland Barber – trombone (18)
- Josh Scalf – trombone (18)
- John Hinchey – trombone (18)
- Melissa Etheridge – acoustic guitar, electric guitar (19)
- Lizzo – flute (20)
- Kyle Dickinson – programming (21)
- Nikki Sixx – bass (22)
- John 5 – electric guitar (22)
- Linda Perry – acoustic guitar (24)
- Doug Wilson – trumpet (25)
- Neil Giraldo – electric guitar (26)
- Ronnie McDowell – additional vocals (28)
- The Jordanaires – background vocals (28)
- Jack Gavin – drums (28)
- Jay Weaver – upright bass (28)
- Ringo Starr – drums (29)
- Paul McCartney – piano, vocals (29)
- Ronnie van Zant – lead vocals (30)
- Gary Rossington – electric guitar (30)
- Artimus Pyle – drums (30)
- Jerry Lyda – electric guitar (30)
- Scott Raines – electric guitar (30)
- Brad Durden – keyboards (30)

Technical

- Dolly Parton – production, executive production
- Kent Wells – production, engineering (all tracks); editing (2–8, 10–30)
- Chris Lord-Alge – mixing
- Ted Jensen – mastering
- Mark Needham – additional production (1), engineering (1, 3, 4, 6–21, 23–26, 28–30), additional engineering (2)
- Don Miggs – additional production (29)
- Mick Fleetwood – additional production (29)
- Kyle Dickinson – engineering, editing
- Joel McKenney – engineering (all tracks), editing (29)
- Kevin Willis – engineering (1–5, 7–10, 15, 17–27, 29, 30)
- Russell Graham – engineering, editing (1)
- Drew Bollman – engineering (2)
- Karen Johnson – engineering (9)
- Jeremy Parker – engineering (22)
- Chris Latham – editing
- Brian Judd – additional engineering (1–26, 28–30)
- Adam Warnecke – additional engineering (25)
- Zach Wills – additional engineering (5)
- Christine Winslow – engineering assistance (1–21, 23–25, 28–30)
- Neal Shaw – engineering assistance (1)
- Ryan Yount – engineering assistance (2)
- Brendon Hapgood – engineering assistance (5)
- Randy Smith – engineering assistance (22)
- Vijat Mohindra – photography

== Charts ==
=== Weekly charts ===
Weekly chart performance
Chart (2023)	Peak position
Australian Albums (ARIA)	16
Australian Country Albums (ARIA)	3
Austrian Albums (Ö3 Austria)	8
Belgian Albums (Ultratop Flanders)	59
Belgian Albums (Ultratop Wallonia)	142
Canadian Albums (Billboard)	18
Croatian International Albums (HDU)	36
Danish Albums (Hitlisten)	37
Dutch Albums (Album Top 100)	17
German Albums (Offizielle Top 100)	18
Irish Albums (IRMA)	70
New Zealand Albums (RMNZ)	12
Scottish Albums (Official Charts)	2
Swiss Albums (Schweizer Hitparade)	2
Swiss Albums (Romandie)	1
UK Albums (Official Charts)	5
UK Americana Albums (Official Charts)	1
US Billboard 200	3
US Top Country Albums (Billboard)	1
US Top Rock Albums (Billboard)	1

Chart (2026)	Peak position
French Rock & Metal Albums (SNEP)	63

=== Year-end charts ===
Year-end chart performance
Chart (2024)	Position
Australian Country Albums (ARIA)	100
US Top Country Albums (Billboard)	42

== Certifications ==
Certifications and sales
Region	Certification	Certified units/sales
United States (RIAA)	Gold	500,000^{‡}
^{‡} Sales+streaming figures based on certification alone.

== Release history ==
Release history
Region	Date	Format	Label	Ref.
Various	November 17, 2023	LP; 8-track; cassette; CD; digital download; streaming	Butterfly; Big Machine	
