= The Bone Season =

2013 novel by Samantha Shannon

- First edition hardcover
- Author: Samantha Shannon
- Language: English
- Genre: Dystopian
- Publisher: Bloomsbury (UK, USA)
- English publication date: 20 August 2013
- Media type: Print, e-book, audiobook
- Pages: 480 pages
- ISBN: 1620401398
- OCLC: 814301490
- LC Class: PR6119.H365B66 2013
- Preceded by: The Pale Dreamer
- Followed by: The Mime Order

The Bone Season is a dystopian fantasy novel by British writer Samantha Shannon, originally published in 2013 by Bloomsbury Publishing. The first in a seven-book series, it was Shannon's debut novel and the first book selected for NBC's Today show's monthly book club.

In 2023, to mark the tenth anniversary of the series, Shannon released the Author's Preferred Text of The Bone Season, in which she made significant changes to the writing style, plot and characters. She went on to make similar revisions to the next three books in the series.

== Plot ==
The year is 2059. For two centuries, the Republic of Scion has led an oppressive campaign against unnaturalness in Europe.

In London, Paige Mahoney is known in the criminal underworld. The right hand of the ruthless White Binder, Paige is a dreamwalker, a rare kind of clairvoyant. Under Scion law, she commits treason simply by breathing.

When Paige is arrested for murder, she meets the mysterious founders of Scion, who have designs on her uncommon abilities. If she is to survive and escape, Paige must use every skill at her disposal—and put her trust in someone who ought to be her enemy.

== Development ==
Shannon started writing The Bone Season while working as an intern for literary agent David Godwin in the summer of 2011. Godwin had previously declined her earlier novel, Aurora. Inspired by Seven Dials, where Godwin was based, Shannon imagined "a girl, having the exact same day at work that [she] was, but she happened to be clairvoyant" and began planning the novel while on her lunch break. She was interested in what might happen if "dystopia dealt with the supernatural" and if there were a second Salem Witch Trials.

Shannon was a student at St Anne's College, Oxford, where she was studying English Language and Literature. She used the University of Oxford as the setting for a penal colony where persecuted clairvoyants are held captive. An interviewer noted that Oxford has many "impossibly neat, manicured lawns and well-tended buildings that act as a kind of tree-ring-dating window onto Britain's architectural past (and present)." Shannon came up with the idea of a shanty town in between the colleges as a way of "juxtaposing the squalor the humans were forced to live in and the grand colleges where the Rephaim live on either side."

== Reception ==
Prior to the release of The Bone Season, the book was compared to the Harry Potter series and Shannon was often referred to as "the next J.K. Rowling". Newspapers drew comparisons due to Shannon signing with Bloomsbury, the same UK publisher as Rowling chose for Harry Potter, and due to both series comprising seven novels. However, Atlantic Wire reporter Arit John commented that the "steady drumbeat of press ... has led to comparisons to nearly every mainstream female fantasy and sci-fi novelist with name recognition".

Critical reception for the book has been mostly positive. USA Today commented upon a similarity to the Harry Potter novels in their positive review for The Bone Season, opining that the book's premise was "awfully familiar in certain aspects" to the aforementioned series while also stating that it had "fresh ideas, excellent original concepts and, best of all, an impressive new voice for fantasy literature." NPR drew the same comparison, but remarked that it was more similar to The Hunger Games than the Potter series. The Telegraph's review also mentioned that the book was similar to The Hunger Games and commented that the plot would be familiar to fantasy readers but that Shannon "shows real skill in combining them so easily into an original and enjoyably escapist fictional world."

== Television adaptation ==
Television rights to The Bone Season were acquired by Rainmaker Content in 2021, with an eight-part miniseries planned. In November 2025, Samantha Shannon confirmed on social media that the rights had been returned to her and no adaptation was currently in the works.

== Series ==
The second installment, The Mime Order was released on 27 January 2015. A prequel novella, The Pale Dreamer, was released as an e-book in 2016. The third installment, The Song Rising, was released on 7 March 2017.

In 2020, Shannon released an additional e-book novella, The Dawn Chorus, set between the third and fourth novels. The fourth installment, The Mask Falling, was released 26 January 2021, and the fifth, The Dark Mirror, in February 2025. The completed series is expected to have a total of seven novels, with the sixth and penultimate installment, The Moth Reborn, expected to be published in 2026.

Supplementary work On the Merits of Unnaturalness, a pamphlet mentioned in-universe, was published in 2016.
