= He Who Drowned the World =

2023 historical fantasy novel

- Author: Shelley Parker-Chan
- Audio read by: Natalie Naudus
- Illustrator: Jennifer Hanover (maps)
- Cover artist: Jung Shang (US); Lucy Scholes (UK)
- Language: English
- Series: The Radiant Emperor #2
- Genre: Alternative history
- Set in: 14th century China
- Publisher: Tor Books (US); Mantle (UK)
- Publication date: Aug 22, 2023 (US); Aug 24, 2023 (UK)
- Publication place: United States; United Kingdom
- Media type: Print, ebook, audiobook
- Pages: 486 pp.
- ISBN: 9781250621825 (hardcover 1st US ed.); 9781529043440 (paperback 1st UK ed.)
- OCLC: 1393258966
- Dewey Decimal: 823/.92

He Who Drowned the World is a 2023 historical fantasy novel by Australian author Shelley Parker-Chan. It is the sequel to the author's 2021 British Fantasy Award-winning debut novel, She Who Became the Sun, and completes The Radiant Emperor Duology.

== Plot ==
The novel continues the story of She Who Became the Sun, in which Zhu Chongba, a peasant girl in 14th century China, assumes her dead brother's identity and his promise of greatness in order to escape the "nothingness" of her own fate. Seeking refuge in a monastery, Zhu Chongba maintains the deception, slowly gains status, rises to power, joins the Red Turbans when the monastery is destroyed, then, having eliminated her adversaries one by one, eventually occupies the capital, and having succeeded in summoning the Mandate of Heaven (which in this series appears as a physical manifestation of fire) is finally crowned King.

In He Who Drowned the World, Zhu Chongba, now Zhu Yuanzhang, the Radiant King, is triumphant, happily married to a woman who knows the secret of her identity, and victorious, having liberated southern China from its Mongol masters. But her ambition is not yet satisfied: she means now to seize the throne and crown herself emperor.

However, Zhu's ambitions are threatened by powerful courtesan Madam Zhang, who covets the throne for her husband. To consolidate her own chances, Zhu must enter a risky alliance with an old enemy: the brilliant, complicated eunuch general Ouyang, who cut off Zhu's hand in their last encounter, and who is still seeking a chance to avenge the murder of his father by the Great Khan.

Meanwhile, the scholar Wang Baoxiang has also found his way into the capital, and plans through a series of lethal intrigues to bring the empire to its knees. For Baoxiang also seeks revenge: his plan, to become the most depraved Great Khan in history—and in so doing, take revenge on both the patriarchal society that despises him for who he is, and the Mongol warrior family who scorned him.

== Themes ==
Darker and more morally ambiguous than She Who Became the Sun, themes include the relationship between power and gender, the destructive nature of desire, "the value of self-acceptance" and "the destructive consequences that self-loathing and bigotry can have on individuals and society at large."

== Reception ==
Reviewers have praised He Who Drowned the World for its vivid writing, uncompromising characterization and innovative treatment of the themes of gender and power. Fantasy author Samantha Shannon described it as "magnificent in every way." The Washington Post named it among the best sci-fi and fantasy titles of 2023, although some critics have expressed reservations concerning the use of real historical figures, where the plot diverges from what we know of the real consequences of the actions of those figures. In interview, Parker-Chan says that this gender-flipped reimagining of Chinese history has caused controversy in China: "Mainland Chinese newspapers were not particularly happy with it. If you mess with your historical figures like the great patriarchs, people will have opinions."
