= The Priory of the Orange Tree =

2019 fantasy novel by Samantha Shannon

- Author: Samantha Shannon
- Genre: Fantasy
- Publisher: Bloomsbury Publishing
- Publication date: 26 February 2019
- Pages: 880
- ISBN: 9781635570281
- OCLC: 1351599196

The Priory of the Orange Tree is a 2019 fantasy novel by writer Samantha Shannon. The novel was published on 26 February 2019 by Bloomsbury Publishing. Shannon describes the novel as a "feminist retelling of Saint George and the Dragon."

A Day of Fallen Night, a standalone prequel, was published on 28 February 2023, also by Bloomsbury Publishing. A shorter prequel to The Priory of the Orange Tree, Among the Burning Flowers, was released in 2025.

== Setting and Style ==
A thousand years before the events of the novel, the evil, fire-breathing wyrm known as the Nameless One spread a draconic plague and was held at bay through daily human sacrifices. Eventually, Princess Cleolind of Lasia was chosen for sacrifice. A traveling Inysh knight named Sir Galian Berethnet intervened, in exchange for Cleolind's hand in marriage and the conversion of her people to his religion. According to some, the Nameless One was defeated by Sir Galian with the sword Ascalon, created by the Witch of Inysca. Sir Galian married Princess Cleolind. Their descendants in the House of Berethnet have ruled Inys as queens and leaders of the Virtues of Knighthood faith, while dragons and magic are condemned and feared. The Grief of Ages or Great Sorrow occurred five hundred years later, when five High Western dragons led by Fýredel created a draconic army of half-dragon monsters. They waged war on humanity for over a year until suddenly falling dormant.

The world of Priory includes the regions of the East, West, and South, each made up of at least two countries. Each region's defining culture emerges from their attitudes towards dragons and the differing stories of the Nameless One's defeat. The Eastern nation of Seiiki closed its borders due to the draconic plague or "red sickness." Due to this disconnection, the West forgot that there are significant differences between Eastern and Western dragons, namely that Easterns are benign. The nations of the East revere dragons and a select few train as dragonriders. Most nations of the West hate and fear them.

The faith of the Virtues of Knighthood is predominant in several nations of the West, collectively called Virtudom. The faith of the Mother among the Lasians believes that rather than Sir Galian, it was Princess Cleolind Onjenyu who banished the Nameless One. The people of the East revere dragons as gods.

The writing is in limited third-person perspective, alternating between four point-of-view characters: the spy Ead Duryan, courtier Arteloth Beck, dragonrider Miduchi Tané (family name first), and alchemist Niclays Roos.

== Synopsis ==
Currently, Queen Sabran the Ninth's power in Inys is tenuous; she has yet to produce an heir to the throne and the Nameless One threatens to awaken again. Ead Duryan is an outsider from the South who acts as a lady-in-waiting and protector to Sabran, but is loyal to the secret mage society of the Priory, which has its own view of the history of Cleolind, the Mother, and Sir Galian, the Deceiver. Meanwhile, Lord Arteloth Beck, close friend of Sabran, is banished from Inys on a futile quest by those who seek to weaken the queen.

In the East, where water dragons are revered as living gods, Miduchi Tané has spent her life training to become a dragonrider. When Tané comes upon an outsider and trespasser from the West, she throws her future into jeopardy by hiding him with Niclays Roos, an alcoholic alchemist searching for the secret to immortality who was banished from Sabran's court years ago.

== Reception ==
Priory received generally positive reviews with articles written for Bustle and the Cornell Sun praising the nuanced female characters, highly fleshed out world, and detailed, intersecting plot lines. Stuart Lee, Professor in English Literature at the University of Oxford, chose the book as one of his top five fantasy books.

However, some reporters, such as Liz Bourke writing for Tor.com, wrote more mixed reviews, praising the queer romance story while criticizing the over 800 page long length of the book.
