= Wrecking Ball (Miley Cyrus song) =

2013 single by Miley Cyrus

Single by Miley Cyrus

from the album Bangerz
- Released: August 25, 2013
- Recorded: 2012–2013
- Studio: Conway Recording Studios; Luke's in the Boo; Monster Island Studio; Maison de Musique; Harmony Studios; Capitol Studios
- Genre: Pop
- Length: 3:41
- Label: RCA
- Songwriters: Maureen McDonald; Stephan Moccio; Sacha Skarbek; David Kim; Lukasz Gottwald; Henry Walter
- Producers: Dr. Luke; Cirkut

Miley Cyrus singles chronology
| "We Can't Stop" (2013) | "Wrecking Ball" (2013) | "23" (2013) |

Music videos
- "Wrecking Ball" on YouTube; "Wrecking Ball" (Director's Cut) on YouTube

"Wrecking Ball" is a song recorded by American pop singer Miley Cyrus for her fourth studio album, Bangerz (2013). It was released on August 25, 2013, by RCA Records, as the album's second single. The song was written by Mozella, Stephan Moccio, and Sacha Skarbek, with Dr. Luke and Cirkut, who also served as the producers, credited as co-writers along with David Kim. The song was recorded from 2012 to 2013, across a multitude of studios in California and New York in the United States and Toronto in Canada. "Wrecking Ball" is a pop ballad which lyrically discusses the deterioration of a relationship.

"Wrecking Ball" debuted at number fifty on the Billboard Hot 100, and subsequently became Cyrus' first number-one song on the chart after the release of its controversial music video; it retained the peak position during the following week. Nine weeks later, the track returned to number one, and consequently had the largest gap between number-one sittings in Billboard Hot 100 history within a single chart run. Outside of the United States, "Wrecking Ball" topped the charts in Canada, Hungary, Israel, Lebanon, Spain, and the United Kingdom, and peaked within the top ten of the charts throughout much of continental Europe and Oceania. It was the best-selling song of 2013 in Finland. It is Cyrus's first and only song to crack the Billboard Decade-End chart, doing so at number 99 on the 2010s chart. As of January 2014, "Wrecking Ball" had sold three million digital copies in the United States. It has been certified nine-times platinum in the US, eight-times platinum in Australia, five-times platinum in Norway, four-times platinum in Canada, triple platinum in Sweden, and double platinum in Italy, Spain, and the UK.

An accompanying music video for "Wrecking Ball" was released on September 9, 2013. It features close-up scenes of Cyrus tearfully singing, reminiscent of the video for "Nothing Compares 2 U" by Sinéad O'Connor, interspersed with footage of a nude Cyrus swinging on an actual wrecking ball. Critics were divided in their opinions of the music video, feeling that it was more provocative than the video for her previous single "We Can't Stop". "Wrecking Ball" previously held the Vevo record for the most views in the first 24 hours after its release with 19.3 million views. At the 2013 MTV Europe Music Awards, Cyrus took home the award for Best Video and the award for Video of the Year at the 2014 MTV Video Music Awards. Adding to the video's success, Cyrus won the award for World's Best Video at the 2014 World Music Awards in Monte Carlo. Cyrus performed "Wrecking Ball" during several live performances, including the iHeartRadio Music Festival, an episode of Saturday Night Live and the "TikTok Tailgate" before Super Bowl LV. In 2023, Cyrus re-recorded the song as a duet with American country singer Dolly Parton for Parton's album Rockstar.

== Background ==
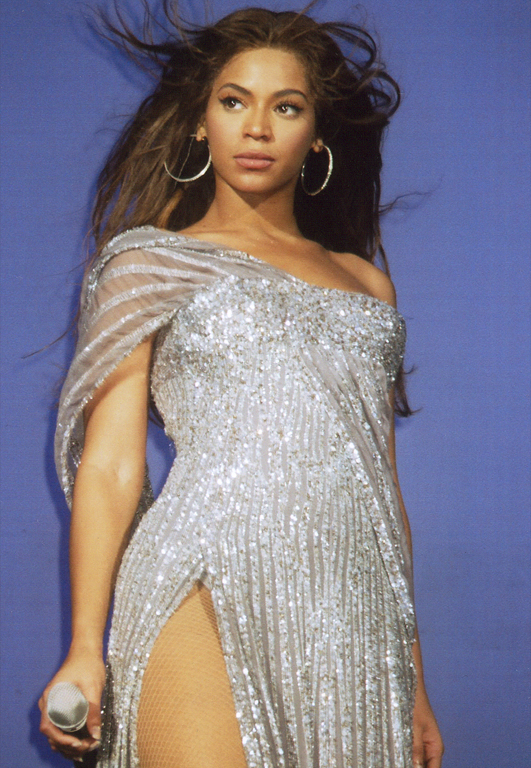
"Wrecking Ball" was written with Beyoncé (pictured) in mind before being offered to Cyrus.

Before directly stating that "Wrecking Ball" was originally written with Beyoncé in mind, songwriter Sacha Skarbek tweeted "Beyonce song now becoming a Miley Cyrus song?!! Good/bad? I don't know??!!!!" in 2012.

The song, and the cover of its parent album Bangerz (2013), were unveiled on August 25, 2013, before Cyrus' performance at the 2013 MTV Video Music Awards. She released the cover artwork for "Wrecking Ball" on September 6, which shows Cyrus dressed in a sleeveless white shirt and underwear while swinging on a wrecking ball. The song was serviced to contemporary hit radio stations in the United States on September 17. It serves as the second single from Bangerz, following the lead single "We Can't Stop", which was released in June.

== Composition ==
"Wrecking Ball"
A 22-second sample of "Wrecking Ball" by Miley Cyrus, where the chorus is heard.

"Wrecking Ball" is a pop ballad; Sheet music for the song shows one flat in common time with a slow tempo. Vocals span from the low note of F_{3} to the high note of B♭_{4}. Miriam Coleman of Rolling Stone noted that it begins with a minimalist keyboard instrumentation, which puts emphasis on Cyrus "anguished vocals", and also described it as a "heartbroken counterpoint" to "We Can't Stop". Cyrus said that "Wrecking Ball" was inspired by "OneRepublic, and the way Timbaland used to do those big ballads."

== Critical reception ==
"Wrecking Ball" was met with praise from music critics. Writing for The A.V. Club, Marah Eakin provided a favorable review, calling it a "solid ballad" and describing it as "a modern day 'My Heart Will Go On' that discussed a deteriorated, shortlived young romance." Kitty Empire from The Observer opined that "the heartbreak section of Bangerz mostly repays your attention" and mentioned "Wrecking Ball" to be a part of it. Although he found the song "predictable," Evan Sawdey of PopMatters gave it an overall positive review and complimented its production and the build up to its chorus, calling it "the kind of broad mainstream song that shows you how to properly build up to a chorus before hitting us over the head with it. Jon Dolan of Rolling Stone felt that it "[rides] the hunger and confusion that make great coming-of-age pop." Writing for AllMusic, Heather Phares considered the track to be a standout from Bangerz.

Writing for Digital Spy, Robert Copsey questioned Cyrus' decision to premiere a ballad in the midst of controversies regarding her "salacious exploits", but enjoyed the song itself and opined that it "proves that there's method behind the madness." In a more mixed review, Joseph Atilano from the Philippine Daily Inquirer appreciated the lyrics for seeming heartfelt, but felt that its production was "comparatively weaker" by comparison to her earlier projects. Mikael Wood of the Los Angeles Times felt that the track proved that Cyrus "isn't just a twerk-bot programmed to titillate", but suggested that her "singing throbs with what feels like an embarrassment of emotion" and found it peculiar that the song discussed the singer's relationship with Hemsworth when her public behavior seemingly suggested that she "couldn't care less about" it.

After a month of voting, on March 31, 2014, Billboard declared the song to be the winner of the 2014 Hot 100 March Madness and their favorite Top 5 single from the past year. It defeated songs like "Holy Grail" by Jay-Z and Justin Timberlake, "Best Song Ever" by One Direction, "Applause" by Lady Gaga, "Timber" by Pitbull and Kesha and finally "Just Give Me a Reason" by Pink and Nate Ruess.

== Commercial performance ==
Before officially being serviced as a single, "Wrecking Ball" made a "hot shot debut" at number 50 on the US Billboard Hot 100 for the week issued on September 7, 2013, with 90,000 downloads in two days. It reached number 14 the following week with 201,000 downloads. After its official premiere as the second single from Bangerz, the track peaked at number one in the United States in its fourth week, heavily assisted by online streaming credits from its recently released music video; this gave Cyrus her first number-one single in the country. It sold 477,000 copies that week, becoming the third-highest single sales week of 2013, behind the 582,000 units moved by "I Knew You Were Trouble" by Taylor Swift and the 557,000 units moved by "Roar" by Katy Perry. In December, "Wrecking Ball" returned to the peak position after being stuck at number two or three the previous nine weeks as Lorde's "Royals" topped the Hot 100, with assistance from a viral parody video and consequently became the largest gap between number-one sittings in Billboard history within a single chart run. The next week it tumbled to number 5 as Eminem's "The Monster" featuring Rihanna topped the chart. As of December 2014, "Wrecking Ball" has sold 3,640,000 copies in the United States. The track peaked at number one on the Canadian Hot 100, and was later certified quadruple-platinum in the country. It reached the peak position on the Mexico Ingles Airplay.

In the United Kingdom, "Wrecking Ball" and Bangerz both debuted at the top of the UK Singles Chart and UK Albums Chart respectively on October 13, 2013 – for the week ending date October 19, 2013 – making Cyrus the first artist of 2013 to achieve an Official Charts Company "chart double". It was later certified platinum by the British Phonographic Industry. Additionally, the song became Cyrus' second chart-topping song in Britain after "We Can't Stop" in August 2013. In Belgium, "Wrecking Ball" peaked at numbers four and five on the Belgian Ultratop in the Flanders and Wallonia regions respectively, and was eventually awarded a gold certification. In Germany, "Wrecking Ball" peaked at number six on the German Singles Chart, and was later certified platinum.

== Music video ==
=== Synopsis ===
An accompanying music video for "Wrecking Ball" was directed by Terry Richardson, filmed in July 2013 and was premiered through Vevo on September 9, 2013. The clip features close-up footage of Cyrus emotionally singing to the camera against a white backdrop, having been inspired by the music video for "Nothing Compares 2 U" by Sinéad O'Connor. Interspersed throughout are scenes of Cyrus licking a sledgehammer and swinging on a wrecking ball. At first, she is shown dressed in a midriff-baring tank top, panties and maroon Doc Martens boots; as the video progresses, she is shown wearing only the boots.

=== Reception ===
"I think the video is much more, if people get past the point that I'm naked and you actually look at me you can tell that I actually look more broken than even the song sounds. The song is a pop ballad. It's one of these songs that everyone is going to relate to, everyone has felt that feeling at one point. If people can take their minds out of the obvious and go into their imagination a little bit and see kind of what the video really means and the way it's so vulnerable and actually if you look in my eyes I look more sad than my voice sounds on the record it was a lot harder to do the video than it was to record the songs. It was much more of an emotional experience."

— Cyrus defending the concept of the music video

The music video received generally negative reviews from critics, who were divided in their opinions regarding Cyrus's increasingly provocative image. Writing for Billboard, Jason Lipshutz stated that the "nude Cyrus shown straddling a swinging wrecking ball" was the most surprising piece of the clip. The staff from Entertainment Weekly joked that viewers would be "scandalized/titillated/disappointed in Billy Ray Cyrus's parenting skills" after seeing his daughter nude and "fellating a sledgehammer". Writing for The Guardian, Michael Hann criticized Cyrus's attempts to distance herself from her innocent image from starring in the teen TV drama series Hannah Montana. He disapproved of the manner in which she transitioned into a career beyond her childhood success, specifically panning her for "exploring the iconography of porn." As of January 2015, Billboard named the video as the fourth-best music video of the 2010s (so far).

James Montgomery from MTV News noted that the controversy surrounding Cyrus's nudity in the video was "to be expected" given her recent controversies, and complimented Richardson "for toning down the salacious scenes (if only for an instant), and allowing the softer, more genuine sides to shine through." Mikael Wood of the Los Angeles Times opined that the music video tried to paint Cyrus in a more serious light with its scenes of her emotionally singing and crying.

Billboard editor Jason Lipshutz opined "Wrecking Ball" is Cyrus's "Cry Me a River", for their controversial music videos and the artists' music evolution. "A decade ago, Justin Timberlake was in "My music will shut everyone up" mode, too, as he railed against a teenybopper image". He concluded, "Cyrus is breathtaking and talented, and, now that she has our attention with her own version of "Cry Me a River," can dial down the shock tactics and present her artistic vision in the form of a new full-length." The music video was censored in some US music channels in USA but also in France, being banned from daily broadcasting before 10pm by the French audiovisual television regulation for "sexual content" and "suggestive scenes".

Sinéad O'Connor, who was an inspiration for aspects of the music video based on her rendition of "Nothing Compares 2 U", praised Cyrus's singing talent but expressed concern about her being "prostituted" by the music industry through her alleged sexualization, going as far to pen an open letter to admonish Cyrus. Cyrus did not react well to the letter, kickstarting a prolonged Twitter beef between the two of them, feuding on personal grounds (including O'Connor's mental health); nevertheless, the two maintained mutual respect for each other's musical ability.

With 19.3 million views in the first twenty-four hours of its release, the music video held the record for having the most views in that time-frame across Vevo platforms. This record was held by One Direction's music video for "Best Song Ever", which amassed 10.9 million views in July. The first-day viewing record was surpassed by the video for "Anaconda" by Nicki Minaj in August 2014, which received 19.6 million views upon its premiere. The video has received over 1.0 billion views on YouTube. A director's cut of the music video was released on September 24, which features only the close-up footage of Cyrus singing against the white backdrop. Vanessa White Wolf from MTV News noted that "the only time Richardson cuts away is at the very end, where, after a quick director's credit page, we see Terry and Miley laughing and mugging for the camera."

The 2014 Australian art prize the Bald Archy was awarded to Judy Nadin for Wrecking Balls Ashes to Ashes, parodying cricketer Mitchell Johnson as Cyrus.

In an interview in 2017, Cyrus stated that she is not "a big fan" of the music video herself. "'Wrecking Ball' -- I'll do it, but I don't love it... It's when you're so stoked about something and then you have to sing a song that bums you out. And I'll never live down when I licked a sledgehammer."

== Live performances ==
On September 21, 2013, Cyrus performed "Wrecking Ball" for the first time during the iHeartRadio Music Festival in Las Vegas; she performed twice, first in the afternoon at Festival Village, and later in the evening at the MGM Grand Garden Arena. Despite generating media attention for a provocative wardrobe, the performance was considered to be "fairly tame considering the VMAs". On October 5, Cyrus served as the host and musical guest during an episode of Saturday Night Live, which gained favorable reviews from music critics. The following Monday, Cyrus performed the track on Today as part of their Toyota Concert Series. She also performed the song during appearances on Late Night with Jimmy Fallon and The Ellen DeGeneres Show later that month.

In November, Cyrus traveled to Europe to sing "Wrecking Ball" at the 2013 MTV Europe Music Awards in Amsterdam on November 10, 2013; she garnered media attention for smoking a joint of marijuana on-stage while accepting the Best Video Award for the track. On November 17, 2013, she performed the song on The X Factor in the United Kingdom. After being criticized for delivering a lackluster vocal performance, Cyrus was placed under "vocal rest" by her doctors in preparation of the Bangerz Tour. During her trip, she also performed on Wetten, dass..? in Germany (November 9), BBC Radio 1's Live Lounge in London (November 12), and the 2013 Bambi Awards in Germany (November 14). On November 24, Cyrus performed "Wrecking Ball" at the 2013 American Music Awards; a digitally animated cat projected on the screen behind her lip-synced the lyrics alongside her. In December, she performed at Jingle Ball concerts in Los Angeles (KIIS-FM Jingle Ball), Saint Paul, Atlanta, New York City, Washington, D.C., Tampa and Sunrise. Cyrus also performed "Wrecking Ball" on Dick Clark's New Year's Rockin' Eve with Ryan Seacrest in Times Square on December 31.

An episode of MTV Unplugged starring Cyrus premiered through MTV on January 29, 2014; she performed an acoustic version of "Wrecking Ball", among several additional tracks from Bangerz. On May 27, 2014, Cyrus performed the song during the World Music Awards held in Monte Carlo, Monaco; where she also won four World Music Awards. She wore a gown with a scenic theme based on flowers during the performance. It received positive reviews for its understated simplicity and strong vocal delivery. Cyrus returned to perform the song during the musical festival on June 21, 2014, Summertime Ball at Wembley Stadium of London, in front of 80,000 people. Cyrus has performed the song during her ongoing Bangerz Tour. A critic from the Nashville Scene praised the performance, writing, "Wrecking Ball was sung by Miley and earnestly shouted in unison by the arena, some of the audience tearing up." Blake Hannon praised Cyrus' vocal delivery, writing, "The crowd kept going when things slowed down for Wrecking Ball. It was the highlight of the night, and not because of anything visual. The costumed characters vanished and the screen was black, with Cyrus belting out one of the best pop power ballads in recent memory with only a smattering of lights. It's a reminder that beneath it all, Cyrus has a voice — and a pretty big one, at that."

== Re-recording with Dolly Parton ==
"Wrecking Ball"

Single by Dolly Parton featuring Miley Cyrus

from the album Rockstar
- Released: October 20, 2023
- Genre: Rock
- Length: 3:55
- Label: Butterfly; Big Machine
- Songwriters: Maureen McDonald; Stephan Moccio; Wallace Skarbek; David Kim; Lukasz Gottwald; Henry Walter
- Producers: Kent Wells; Dolly Parton

Dolly Parton singles chronology
| "What's Up?" (2023) | "Wrecking Ball" (2023) | "Southern Accents" (2024) |

Miley Cyrus singles chronology
| "Used to Be Young" (2023) | "Wrecking Ball" (2023) | "Doctor (Work It Out)" (2024) |

On November 30, 2022, American country singer and Cyrus' godmother, Dolly Parton, announced the plan to release her first rock album and that she was going to ask several other artists, including Cyrus, to be featured on it. On January 17, 2023 she revealed its title, Rockstar. On May 9, 2023, she announced its release date along with the tracklist. Cyrus was expected to be featured on a re-recording of "Wrecking Ball". Previously they performed it together, in a medley with Parton's "I Will Always Love You", during the 2022–23 Miley's New Year's Eve Party, broadcast on NBC. Parton revealed that the performance inspired her to record the song as a duet. On October 20, 2023, the song was released as the seventh and final single to Rockstar.

== Cover versions and media usage ==
In September 2013, British singer-songwriter James Arthur covered "Wrecking Ball" on Radio Hamburg in Germany. Later that month, The Gregory Brothers released a country version, which Laura Vitto from Mashable felt "trades in Miley's pop-ballad sound for a twangier feel." American singer-songwriter Alonzo Holt released his own rendition in October, which featured vocals from Arthur; it peaked at number 97 on the UK Singles Chart and number 71 on the Irish Singles Chart. Upstate New York alternative metal band Cry To The Blind released a cover of "Wrecking Ball" on December 11, 2013. American group Haim covered "Wrecking Ball" during their performance on BBC Radio 1's Live Lounge, while the trio London Grammar sang it for the same session in December. Rumer Willis later sang the track during a performance which Chiderah Monde from Daily News felt "captured more of the emotion behind the song" than Cyrus' version. American singer Rebecca Black uploaded an acoustic version to her YouTube channel in November. Canadian singer Sarah Blackwood of Walk Off the Earth also released an acoustic version.

Danie Geimer, a contestant on the third season of The X Factor USA, performed the track during the first live show on October 29, while Dami Im from the fifth season of The X Factor Australia sang it in the semi-final round. Marley Rose (Melissa Benoist) covered the song and parodied elements of the music video for the Glee episode "The End of Twerk". The late Christina Grimmie sang the song during the Blind Auditions of sixth season of The Voice USA. Australian artist Kat Jade auditioned with a stripped-back/single-piano version in the third season of The Voice Australia after posting a popular acapella version of the song to her YouTube channel. "Weird Al" Yankovic covered the song as the first in his polka medley "NOW That's What I Call Polka!" for his 2014 album Mandatory Fun. Metal band August Burns Red covered the song for the compilation album Punk Goes Pop 6. Melai Cantiveros impersonated Miley Cyrus in Your Face Sounds Familiar (Philippines season 1) and performed this song, which she won the season.

50 Cent told NME that the song was the one he would perform at karaoke: "Just a big pop song that no one would suspect, just to fuck with them. Make them go, What?" The song was featured in the films The Night Before, Free Guy and Strays.

In 2019, Tiffany Young covered the song as part of her Magnetic Moon tour.

In 2021, the song was covered by Brandy in the ABC drama series Queens. The song was released digitally worldwide on October 25, 2021.

In 2025, the song was picked by Thea Gilmore for inclusion in her favorites album These Quiet Friends.

== Credits and personnel ==
Credits adapted from the liner notes of Bangerz and Tidal.

=== Recording locations ===
- Engineered at Conway Recording Studios (Hollywood, California); Luke's In the Boo (Malibu, California); Monster Island Studio (New York City, New York); Maison de Musique (Toronto, Canada); Harmony Studios (West Hollywood, California); Capitol Studios (Hollywood, California)
- Mixed at MixStar Studios (Virginia Beach, Virginia)

=== Personnel ===
- Charlie Bisberat – violin
- Mike Caffery – engineering
- David Richard Campbell – strings
- Steve Churchyard – engineering (strings)
- Cirkut – songwriter, producer, programming, instruments
- Kevin Connolly – violin
- Miley Cyrus – lead vocals
- Dr. Luke – songwriter, producer, programming, instruments
- Andrew Duckles – viola
- Eric Eylands – assistant
- Serban Ghenea – mixing
- Clint Gibbs – engineering
- John Hanes – engineering for mixing
- Sven Heidinga – engineering
- Suzie Katayama – contracting, cello
- David Kim – songwriter
- Songa Lee – violin
- Darrin McCann – viola
- Mozella – songwriter
- Stephan Moccio – songwriter, piano
- Grace Oh – violin
- Joel Pargman – violin
- Alyssa Park – violin
- Sara Parkins – violin
- Rachael Pindlen – assistant
- Steve Richards – cello
- Irene Richter – production coordinator
- Sacha Skarbek – songwriter
- Rudy Stein – cello
- John Wittenberg – violin
- Steven Wolf – drums

== Charts ==
=== Weekly charts ===
Weekly chart performance
| Chart (2013–2014) | Peak position |
|---|---|
| Australia (ARIA) | 2 |
| Austria (Ö3 Austria Top 40) | 2 |
| Belgium (Ultratop 50 Flanders) | 4 |
| Belgium (Ultratop 50 Wallonia) | 5 |
| Canada Hot 100 (Billboard) | 1 |
| Bulgaria International Airplay (IFPI) | 1 |
| CIS Airplay (TopHit) | 35 |
| Czech Republic Airplay (ČNS IFPI) | 2 |
| Czech Republic Singles Digital (ČNS IFPI) | 34 |
| Denmark (Tracklisten) | 4 |
| Finland (Suomen virallinen lista) | 9 |
| Finland Airplay (Radiosoittolista) | 14 (Note: IFPI Finland began their airplay chart in the 47th week of 2013, nine weeks after "Wrecking Ball" began its run on the sales-only single chart. The peak position was on its first week on the chart, and it gradually dropped afterwards.) |
| France (SNEP) | 2 |
| Greece Digital Songs (Billboard) | 2 |
| Germany (GfK) | 6 |
| Hong Kong (HKRIA) | 10 |
| Hungary (Rádiós Top 40) | 13 |
| Hungary (Single Top 40) | 1 |
| Ireland (IRMA) | 2 |
| Israel International Airplay (Media Forest) | 1 |
| Italy (FIMI) | 3 |
| Lebanon (Lebanese Top 20) | 1 |
| Luxembourg Digital Song Sales (Billboard) | 3 |
| Mexico (Billboard Mexican Airplay) | 2 |
| Mexico Anglo (Monitor Latino) | 3 |
| Netherlands (Dutch Top 40) | 11 |
| Netherlands (Single Top 100) | 13 |
| New Zealand (Recorded Music NZ) | 2 |
| Norway (VG-lista) | 2 |
| Poland Airplay (ZPAV) | 4 |
| Portugal Digital Song Sales (Billboard) | 4 |
| Romania (Airplay 100) | 38 |
| Russia Airplay (TopHit) | 50 |
| Scottish Singles Sales (Official Charts) | 1 |
| Slovakia Airplay (ČNS IFPI) | 10 |
| Slovenia (SloTop50) | 5 |
| South Africa Airplay (EMA) | 2 |
| Spain (Promusicae) | 1 |
| Sweden (Sverigetopplistan) | 3 |
| Switzerland (Schweizer Hitparade) | 5 |
| UK Singles (Official Charts) | 1 |
| Ukraine Airplay (TopHit) | 22 |
| US Billboard Hot 100 | 1 |
| US Adult Contemporary (Billboard) | 15 |
| US Adult Pop Airplay (Billboard) | 7 |
| US Dance Club Songs (Billboard) | 15 |
| US Dance Airplay (Billboard) | 19 |
| US Pop Airplay (Billboard) | 1 |
| US Rhythmic Airplay (Billboard) | 16 |
| Venezuela Pop Rock General (Record Report) | 22 |

Weekly chart performance
| Chart (2023) | Peak position |
|---|---|
| Global 200 (Billboard) | 178 |

=== Year-end charts ===
Year-end chart performance
| Chart (2013) | Position |
|---|---|
| Australia (ARIA) | 22 |
| Austria (Ö3 Austria Top 40) | 35 |
| Belgium (Ultratop Flanders) | 36 |
| Belgium (Ultratop Wallonia) | 59 |
| Canada (Canadian Hot 100) | 33 |
| Denmark (Tracklisten) | 50 |
| Finland (Suomen virallinen lista) | 1 |
| Germany (Media Control AG) | 47 |
| Italy (FIMI) | 38 |
| Netherlands (Dutch Top 40) | 47 |
| Netherlands (Mega Single Top 100) | 34 |
| New Zealand (Recorded Music NZ) | 32 |
| Slovenia (SloTop50) | 36 |
| South Africa (IFPI South Africa) | 9 |
| Spain (PROMUSICAE) | 33 |
| Sweden (Sverigetopplistan) | 31 |
| Switzerland (Schweizer Hitparade) | 49 |
| Taiwan (Hito Radio) | 45 |
| UK Singles (Official Charts Company) | 41 |
| US Billboard Hot 100 | 18 |
| US Mainstream Top 40 (Billboard) | 48 |

Year-end chart performance
| Chart (2014) | Position |
|---|---|
| Belgium (Ultratop Wallonia) | 74 |
| Canada (Canadian Hot 100) | 62 |
| France (SNEP) | 95 |
| Italy (FIMI) | 73 |
| Slovenia (SloTop50) | 45 |
| Spain (PROMUSICAE) | 45 |
| Switzerland (Schweizer Hitparade) | 73 |
| US Billboard Hot 100 | 44 |
| US Adult Contemporary (Billboard) | 46 |

=== Decade-end charts ===
Decade-end chart performance
| Chart (2010–2019) | Position |
|---|---|
| US Billboard Hot 100 | 99 |

== Certifications and sales ==
Certifications and sales
| Region | Certification | Certified units/sales |
|---|---|---|
| Australia (ARIA) | 8× Platinum | 560,000^{‡} |
| Austria (IFPI Austria) | Gold | 15,000^{*} |
| Belgium (BRMA) | Gold | 15,000^{*} |
| Brazil (Pro-Música Brasil) | 2× Diamond | 500,000^{‡} |
| Canada (Music Canada) | 4× Platinum | 320,000^{*} |
| Denmark (IFPI Danmark) | Gold | 15,000^{^} |
| Finland | — | 60,394 |
| Germany (BVMI) | Platinum | 300,000^{^} |
| Italy (FIMI) | 2× Platinum | 60,000^{‡} |
| Mexico (AMPROFON) | Diamond+3× Platinum+Gold | 510,000^{‡} |
| Netherlands (NVPI) | Platinum | 20,000^{^} |
| New Zealand (RMNZ) | 3× Platinum | 90,000^{‡} |
| Norway (IFPI Norway) | 5× Platinum | 300,000^{‡} |
| Portugal (AFP) | Gold | 10,000^{‡} |
| Spain (Promusicae) | 2× Platinum | 120,000^{‡} |
| Sweden (GLF) | 3× Platinum | 120,000^{‡} |
| Switzerland (IFPI Switzerland) | Platinum | 30,000^{^} |
| United Kingdom (BPI) | 3× Platinum | 1,800,000^{‡} |
| United States (RIAA) | 9× Platinum | 9,000,000^{‡} |
Streaming
| Denmark (IFPI Danmark) | Platinum | 1,800,000^{†} |
^{*} Sales figures based on certification alone.^{^} Shipments figures based on certification alone.^{‡} Sales+streaming figures based on certification alone.^{†} Streaming-only figures based on certification alone.

== Release history ==
| Country | Date | Format | Label | Ref. |
|---|---|---|---|---|
| United States | August 25, 2013 | Digital download | RCA | |
| Italy | September 13, 2013 | Contemporary hit radio | Sony Music | |
| United States | September 16, 2013 | Hot adult contemporary | RCA | |
| United States | September 17, 2013 | Contemporary hit radio | RCA | |
| United Kingdom | October 6, 2013 | Digital download | RCA | |
| Germany | October 18, 2013 | CD single | Sony Music | |

== See also ==
- List of Billboard Hot 100 number-one singles of 2013
- List of Canadian Hot 100 number-one singles of 2013
