= British Fantasy Special Award =

British literary award

- Awarded for: May be presented to individuals or organizations. May be presented for work completed in the previous year, or throughout their lifetime.
- Country: United Kingdom
- Presented by: British Fantasy Society
- First award: 1973; 53 years ago
- Most recent winner: Jane Johnson
- Website: britishfantasysociety.org

The British Fantasy Special Award, also known as the Karl Edward Wagner Award, is a literary award given annually as part of the British Fantasy Awards. The award is named after American author Karl Edward Wagner.

== History ==
The Special Award was originally a discretionary award and was not given every year. After 1995, the British Fantasy Award for Best Newcomer was merged with the Special Award. The Newcomer Award was separated again beginning in 2007.

== Winners ==
Year	Winner	Ref.
1973	Robert E. Howard	
1981	Stephen King	
1983	Karl Edward Wagner	
1984	Donald A. Wollheim	
1984	Elsie Wollheim	
1985	Manly Wade Wellman	
1986	Leslie Flood	
1987	Charles L. Grant	
1989	Ronald Chetwynd-Hayes	
1990	Peter Coleborn	
1991	Dorothy Lumley	
1992	Andrew I. Porter	
1993	Michael Moorcock	
1994	Dave Sutton	
1995	John Jarrold	
1996 (Note: 1996 is the only year to date in which the BFS released a shortlist for the Special Award. Shortlisted honorees included Mike Chinn, Peter Coleborn, Jo Fletcher, Richard Matheson, and John Clute.)	Mike O'Driscoll	
1996	Steve Lockley	
1997	Jo Fletcher	
1998	D. F. Lewis	
1999	Diana Wynne Jones	
2000	Anne McCaffrey	
2001	Peter Haining	
2003	Alan Garner	
2004	Peter Jackson	
2005	Nigel Kneale	
2006	Stephen Jones	
2007	Ellen Datlow	
2008	Ray Harryhausen	
2009	Hayao Miyazaki	
2010	Robert Holdstock	
2011	Terry Pratchett	
2012	Peter Crowther	
2012	Nicky Crowther	
2013	Iain M. Banks	
2014	Farah Mendlesohn	
2015	Juliet E. McKenna	
2017	Jan Edwards	
2018	N. K. Jemisin	
2019	Ian Whates	
2020	Craig Lockley	
2021	Alasdair Stuart	
2022	Maureen Kincaid Speller	
2023	Ann Landmann	
2024	Ramsey Campbell	
2025	Ro Pardoe	
2026	Jane Johnson	
