= Kiyanu Kim =

American songwriter

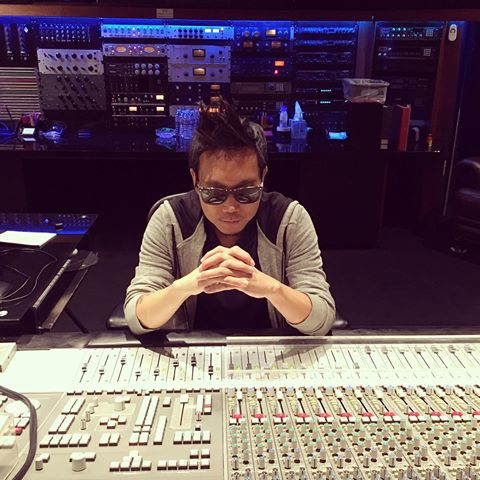
- Kiyanu Kim
- Born: Kiyanu Kim
- Occupation(s): songwriter, producer, mixer, musician

Kiyanu Kim is a Korean-American songwriter, musician and producer. He was born in Seoul, Korea, on January 19, 1973. He currently resides in New York.

He is best known for co-writing the Miley Cyrus hit "Wrecking Ball", providing Cyrus with the initial kernel of the song which was later developed by others.

Kim has worked with Gwen Stefani, Linda Perry, Lamont Dozier, Ben Jelen and Gala with songs he has produced/written being used in over thirty television shows.

Kim served as a panelist in May 2015 at the Montauk Music Festival in Montauk, New York. The industry-focused panel discussed the issues faced by performing musicians.

== Works ==
=== Instruments and performance ===
| 1 | Misuniverse - All's Well That Ends (CD, EP) | Not On Label | none | 2003 |
| 2 | John Sutherland - Keep Talking (CD, Single, Enh) | Centaurus | 9500005 | 2005 |
| 3 | Cubworld - Step Lightly Create Out Loud | Sellaband | | 2007 |
| 4 | Ben Jelen - Ex-Sensitive (CD, Album, Dig) | Custard Records | 8249-60020-2 | 2007 |
| 5 | Vienna Teng - Inland Territory (CD, Album) | Decca, Zoë Records | 431 1252 | 2009 |
| 6 | Blacklight Rumble - Savior (CD, EP) | Not On Label | none | 2009 |
| 7 | Keli Price - Move My Way (File, WAV) | The Orchard | none | 2009 |
| 8 | Tucker Jameson & The Hot Mugs - Does It Make You Feel Good?(CD, Album) | Not On Label (Tucker Jameson & The Hot Mugs Self Released) | MID5213 | 2010 |
| 9 | Delta Rae - Carry The Fire (CD, Album) | Sire, Warner Bros. Records | 531391-2 | 2012 |
| 10 | Kat Solar - Snake Eyes (File, WAV, Album) | Not On Label | none | 2012 |
| 11 | Lachi, Gary "Nesta" Pine - It's our time (File, MP3, WAV, Single) | Mixluv | none | 2014 |
| 12 | Clair Reilly-Roe - Converse Rubber Tracks (3xFile, WAV, EP) | Converse | none | 2016 |
| 13 | Zandi Holup - Lone Star (CD, EP) | Not On Label | none | 2016 |
| 14 | Clair Reilly-Roe - The Bitter End (File, WAV, EP) | Not On Label | none | 2017 |
| 15 | Lawrence Cooley - Listen In (CD, EP) | LSC Music Group | none | 2017 |
=== Writing and arrangement ===
| 1 | Misuniverse - All's Well That Ends (CD, EP) | Not On Label | none | 2003 |
| 2 | Kat Solar - Snake Eyes (File, WAV, Album) | Not On Label | none | 2012 |
| 3 | Miley Cyrus - Wrecking Ball (CD, Single) | RCA | 88843 00077 2 | 2013 |
| 4 | Wrecking BallMiley Cyrus - Bangerz (CD, Album, Del) | RCA, Sony Music | 88883 74525 2 | 2013 |
| 5 | LoveCryme - LoveCryme (CD, EP) | Sojourn Records | SR-040 | 2013 |
| 6 | Lachi, Gary "Nesta" Pine - It's our time (File, MP3, WAV, Single) | Mixluv | none | 2014 |
| 7 | Clair Reilly-Roe - Converse Rubber Tracks (3xFile, WAV, EP) | Converse | none | 2016 |
| 8 | Zandi Holup - Lone Star (CD, EP) | Not On Label | none | 2016 |
=== Production ===
| 1 | Misuniverse - All's Well That Ends (CD, EP) | Not On Label | none | 2003 |
| 2 | Cubworld - Step Lightly Create Out Loud | Sellaband | | 2007 |
| 3 | Blacklight Rumble - Savior | Not On Label | none | 2009 |
| 4 | Keli Price - Move My Way | The Orchard | none | 2009 |
| 5 | Tucker Jameson & The Hot Mugs - Does It Make You feel Better? | Not On Label | MID5213 | 2010 |
| 6 | Kat Solar - Snake Eyes | Not On Label | none | 2012 |
| 7 | LoveCryme - LoveCryme | Sojourn Records | SR-040 | 2013 |
| 8 | Dialogue from a Silent Film - Grey Skies | SLCR Recordings | none | 2014 |
| 9 | Lachi, Gary "Nesta" Pine - It's our time | Mixluv | none | 2014 |
| 10 | Clair Reilly-Roe - Converse Rubber Tracks | Converse | none | 2016 |
| 11 | Zandi Holup - Lone Star | Not On Label | none | 2016 |
| 12 | Lawrence Cooley - Listen In | LSC Music Group | none | 2017 |
| 13 | Clair Reilly-Roe - The Bitter End | Not On Label | none | 2017 |
=== Technical ===
| 1 | Misuniverse - All's Well That Ends (CD, EP) | Not On Label | none | 2003 |
| 2 | Kat Solar - Snake Eyes | Not On Label | none | 2012 |
| 3 | LoveCryme - LoveCryme | Sojourn Records | SR-040 | 2013 |
| 4 | Lachi, Gary "Nesta" Pine - It's our time | Mixluv | none | 2014 |
| 5 | Dialogue from a Silent Film - Grey Skies | SLCR Recordings | none | 2014 |
| 6 | Clair Reilly-Roe - Converse Rubber Tracks | Converse | none | 2016 |
| 7 | Zandi Holup - Lone Star | Not On Label | none | 2016 |
| 8 | Lawrence Cooley - Listen In | LSC Music Group | none | 2017 |
| 9 | Clair Reilly-Roe - The Bitter End | Not On Label | none | 2017 |
