= The Mime Order =

2015 novel by Samantha Shannon

- First edition (UK)
- Author: Samantha Shannon
- Cover artist: Ivan Belikov
- Language: English
- Series: The Bone Season
- Genre: Dystopian
- Published: 2015 (Bloomsbury)
- Publication place: United Kingdom
- ISBN: 978-1-526-67598-9
- Preceded by: The Bone Season
- Followed by: The Song Rising

The Mime Order is a dystopian fantasy novel by British writer Samantha Shannon, originally published by Bloomsbury Publishing in 2015. It is a direct sequel to The Bone Season and the second instalment in the Bone Season series.

In 2024, Shannon released the Author's Preferred Text of The Mime Order.

== Plot ==
Paige Mahoney has escaped the secret prison city of Oxford. Now a fugitive in London, she nurtures a new taste for revolution.

Oxford may be behind her, but the Republic of Scion is undefeated. As Scion turns its all-seeing eye on Paige, she is forced to return to Jaxon Hall, her charismatic and brutal employer, to keep her foothold in the underworld.

But Paige will bow to no one now, and not even Jaxon will stop her exposing the corruption in the syndicate. As she plots to win the fabled Rose Crown, both sides of an ancient conflict seek her talents for themselves.

== Reception ==
In her very positive NPR review, Janet Ciabbatari writes: "Shannon's haunting dystopian universe is rich in detail, consistent, suffused with familiar afternotes. Just when the bloodshed seems over the top, she turns to shimmering descriptions of Paige's dangerously illicit tie to Warden. When Paige seems toughest, Shannon reminds us of her empathy for the downtrodden." In a more indifferent review, Kirkus Reviews predicted that Shannon fans would not be disappointed by the "propulsive plot", noting the action of the book outshines the prose, which is rated as "serviceable".

Calling the novel "a MUST", The Guardian review enthuses that "there is no question whether to pick up The Bone Season". The review is equally laudatory about the characters, calling them wonderfully imagined, noting especially how brilliant the character of Jaxon is, and how intelligent and respect-inspiring the main character Paige is. The Independent joins the line of rave reviews, asserting that the book would leave "addicts craving a third hit". Calling the whodunit plot "gripping", the review concludes that "Shannon’s ability to take classic tropes, such as forbidden love and dystopian societies, and give them a well-knuckled twist is to be admired – books one and two have demonstrated that she looks set to become a trailblazer for young talent".

The Mime Order was Goodreads Choice Award Nominee for Fantasy in 2015.
