= Ringworm (band) =

American hardcore punk band

- Origin: Cleveland, Ohio, U.S.
- Genres: Metalcore; hardcore punk; thrash metal
- Years active: 1989–1994; 1999–present
- Labels: Incision; Victory; Relapse; Nuclear Blast
- Members: James "Human Furnace" Bulloch; Matt Sorg; Mike Lare; Ryan Steigerwald; Ed Stephens; Grady Wessollek

Ringworm is an American metalcore band formed in Cleveland, Ohio in 1989. Their name was derived from a Vincent Price movie. The band has toured extensively in the United States, Australia, New Zealand, and Europe and has released four albums via Victory Records. In 2013, the band announced they had signed with Relapse Records, releasing three further albums with the label before moving to Nuclear Blast in 2023. Vocalist Human Furnace plays in the Cleveland metal band Gluttons and solo project Holyghost.

The song "Life After the End of the World", from the band's 2005 album Justice Replaced By Revenge, was featured in the 2016 animated film The Secret Life of Pets.

== Musical style ==
In a 2019 interview with Davin Deblat, Human Furnace identified the band more with the metal scene than the hardcore scene, stating "70–80 percent of our songs are mostly just thrash. Very fast, very thrashy, and then you got some breakdowns. When you play a hardcore gig, everyone just stares at you for your whole set and they just wait for that one riff so they can spin around in circles and crowd-kill. And I'm not really about that. So when you play a metal show and you play thrash riffs and headbanging riffs, then metalheads respond to that and it's a fun thing. I definitely relate more to that scene because that's what I am. I grew up a punk rock kid, a metal kid, so I have a lot more in common with that scene… these days, anyway."

They have cited influences including Carcass, Slayer, Integrity, Agnostic Front, Cro-Mags, Bolt Thrower, Exodus, Corrosion of Conformity, Dirty Rotten Imbeciles and the Crumbsuckers.

== Members ==
=== Current ===
- James "Human Furnace" Bulloch – vocals
- Matt Sorg – guitar
- Ed Stephens – bass
- Grady Wessollek – drums

=== Former ===
- John Comprix – guitar
- Mike Lare – bass, guitar, backing vocals
- Matt Devries – guitar
- Frank Novinec – guitar
- Chris Pellow – bass
- Blaze Tishko – guitar, bass
- John "Lockjaw" Tole – bass
- Chris Smith – guitar
- Kenny Carpenter – drums
- Bob Zeiger – drums
- Aaron Ramirez – bass
- Aaron Dallison – guitar
- Steve Rauckhorst – bass
- Ben Hollowell – bass
- Chris Dora – drums
- Danny Zink – drums
- Ryan Steigerwald – drums
- Mark Witherspoon - guitar

== Discography ==
- 1991: Ringworm (self-released demo), later released by Overkill Records
- 1993: The Promise (Incision Records), later reissued on CD by Deathwish Inc. and vinyl by A389 Recordings
- 1994: Split 7" with Boiling Point (Lost and Found Records)
- 1995: Flatline (demo from 1991 which became bonus tracks on subsequent re-release of The Promise) (Lost and Found Records)
- 1999: Madness of War (self-released demo)
- 2000: Hollow Soul (split with Godbelow) (Surface Records)
- 2001: Split 7" with Cold as Life (Stillborn Records)
- 2001: Birth is Pain (Victory Records)
- 2003: Splitseveninch (split with Terror) (Deathwish Inc.)
- 2005: Justice Replaced by Revenge (Victory Records)
- 2007: The Venomous Grand Design (Victory Records)
- 2011: Scars (Victory Records)
- 2011: Your Soul Belongs to Us... (split with Mindsnare) (A389 Recordings)
- 2012: Stigmatas in the Flesh (live album) (A389 Recordings)
- 2013: Bleed (EP) (Relapse Records)
- 2014: Hammer of the Witch (Relapse Records)
- 2016: Snake Church (Relapse Records)
- 2019: Death Becomes My Voice (Relapse Records)
- 2023: Seeing Through Fire (Nuclear Blast)

== Videography ==
- "Justice Replaced by Revenge" (2005)
- "The Ninth Circle" (2007)
- "Used Up, Spit Out" (2011)
- "Snake Church" (2016)
- "Shades of Blue" (2016)
- "Acquiesce" (2019)
- "No Solace, No Quarter, No Mercy" (2023)
- "House of Flies" (2023)
