= The Pale Dreamer =

2016 novella by Samantha Shannon

- First edition cover
- Author: Samantha Shannon
- Cover artist: Ivan Belikov
- Language: English
- Series: The Bone Season
- Genre: Dystopian
- Published: 2016 (Bloomsbury)
- Publication date: December 6, 2016
- Publication place: United Kingdom
- ISBN: 978-1-526-68323-6
- Followed by: The Bone Season

The Pale Dreamer is a dystopian fantasy novella by British author Samantha Shannon, originally published by Bloomsbury Publishing in 2016. It is a prequel to the Bone Season series, taking place around three years before the events of The Bone Season.

== Plot ==
In the perilous heart of Scion London, a dangerous and valuable poltergeist is on the loose—and it must be caught before chaos erupts on the streets of the capital. Here, the clairvoyant underworld plays by its own rules, and rival gangs will stop at nothing to win such a magnificent prize.

Sixteen-year-old Paige Mahoney is working for Jaxon Hall, the most notorious mime-lord in the citadel. He thinks she is hiding a powerful gift, but it refuses to surface. Maybe this is the opportunity she needs to secure her position in his gang, the Seven Seals.

== Characters ==
- Paige Eva Mahoney: An Irish dreamwalker living in the Scion Citadel of London
- Jaxon Hall: Paige's employer, mime-lord of I-4, a binder
- Nicklas 'Nick' Nygård: Paige's best friend, a member of the Seven Seals and an oracle
- Eliza Renton: A member of the Seven Seals and an automatise (art medium)
- Sarah 'Sally' Metyard: A poltergeist, daughter of Sarah Metyard, sentenced to death for the murder of Anne Naylor
- Anne 'Nanny' Naylor: A poltergeist, murdered by Sarah and Sally Metyard

== Development ==
The Pale Dreamer is loosely based on the true story of apprentice milliner Anne Naylor, who died at the hands of her employers, Sarah Metyard and her daughter, Sarah 'Sally' Metyard, in Georgian London. According to official records, Anne was beaten and starved by the Metyards after attempting to escape. Her sister was also murdered by the Metyards.

Both Metyards were executed by hanging at Tyburn in 1768. Countless reports exist of "a girl’s screams being heard in Farringdon Station" since 1758, according to MyLondon's Erica Buist.

== Reception ==
The Daily Telegraph's Helen Brown described Paige Mahoney as "a clever and courageous character, reminiscent of Katniss Everdeen from The Hunger Games". The Bone Season series is an international bestseller, with author Samantha Shannon being compared to J. K. Rowling.
