= Hammer of the Witch =

Studio album by Ringworm
- Released: March 18, 2014
- Recorded: April–August 2013
- Studio: Spider Studios (Cleveland, OH)
- Genre: Metallic hardcore; thrash metal
- Length: 41:05
- Label: Relapse

Ringworm chronology
Scars (2011)	Hammer of the Witch (2014)	Snake Church (2016)

Hammer of the Witch is the sixth studio album by the American hardcore band Ringworm. It was released on Match 18, 2014, through Relapse Records, marking the band's first full-length album for the label. Recording sessions took place at Spider Studios in Cleveland from April to August 2013.

The album peaked at number 21 on the Top Hard Rock Albums and number 14 on the Heatseekers Albums charts in the United States.

== Critical reception ==
Professional ratings
Aggregate scores
Source	Rating
Metacritic	78/100
Review scores
Source	Rating
Alternative Press	4/5 stars
Blabbermouth.net	8.5/10
Exclaim!	8/10
Metal Hammer	4/5 stars
Metal Injection	9/10
Pitchfork	7/10
Revolver	4/5

Hammer of the Witch was met with generally favorable reviews from music critics. At Metacritic, which assigns a normalized rating out of 100 to reviews from mainstream publications, the album received an average score of 78 based on five reviews.

Phil Freeman of Alternative Press praised the album, calling it a "a knuckle-walking, face-punching, tooth-spitting hardcore/metal album that'll have you looking around for things and people that could use a good kicking". Bradley Zorgdrager of Exclaim! concluded: "there are no interludes or breaks, a consistency that is both the band's greatest strength and only weakness". Sammi Chichester of Revolver stated: "Cleveland metallic-hardcore heavyweights Ringworm have delivered what should stand as their finest entry in their catalogue". Andy O'Connor of Pitchfork called it "a solid record throughout", continuing "but it is one of those records that feels like a collection of songs—good songs!—rather than an actual album".

== Track listing ==
No.	Title	Length
1.	"Dawn of Decay"	3:18
2.	"Bleed"	2:36
3.	"Leave Your Skin at the Door"	3:13
4.	"Exit Life"	1:43
5.	"Psychic Vampire"	2:39
6.	"King of Blood"	3:23
7.	"I Recommend Amputation"	3:14
8.	"Hammer of the Witch"	3:22
9.	"We'll Always Have the End"	3:36
10.	"One of Us Is Going to Have to Die..."	3:53
11.	"Vicious Circle of Life"	3:15
12.	"Die Like a Pig"	3:42
13.	"Height of Revelation"	3:11
Total length:		41:05

== Charts ==
Chart (2014)	Peak position
US Top Hard Rock Albums (Billboard)	21
US Heatseekers Albums (Billboard)	14
