= Tasha Suri =

British fantasy author

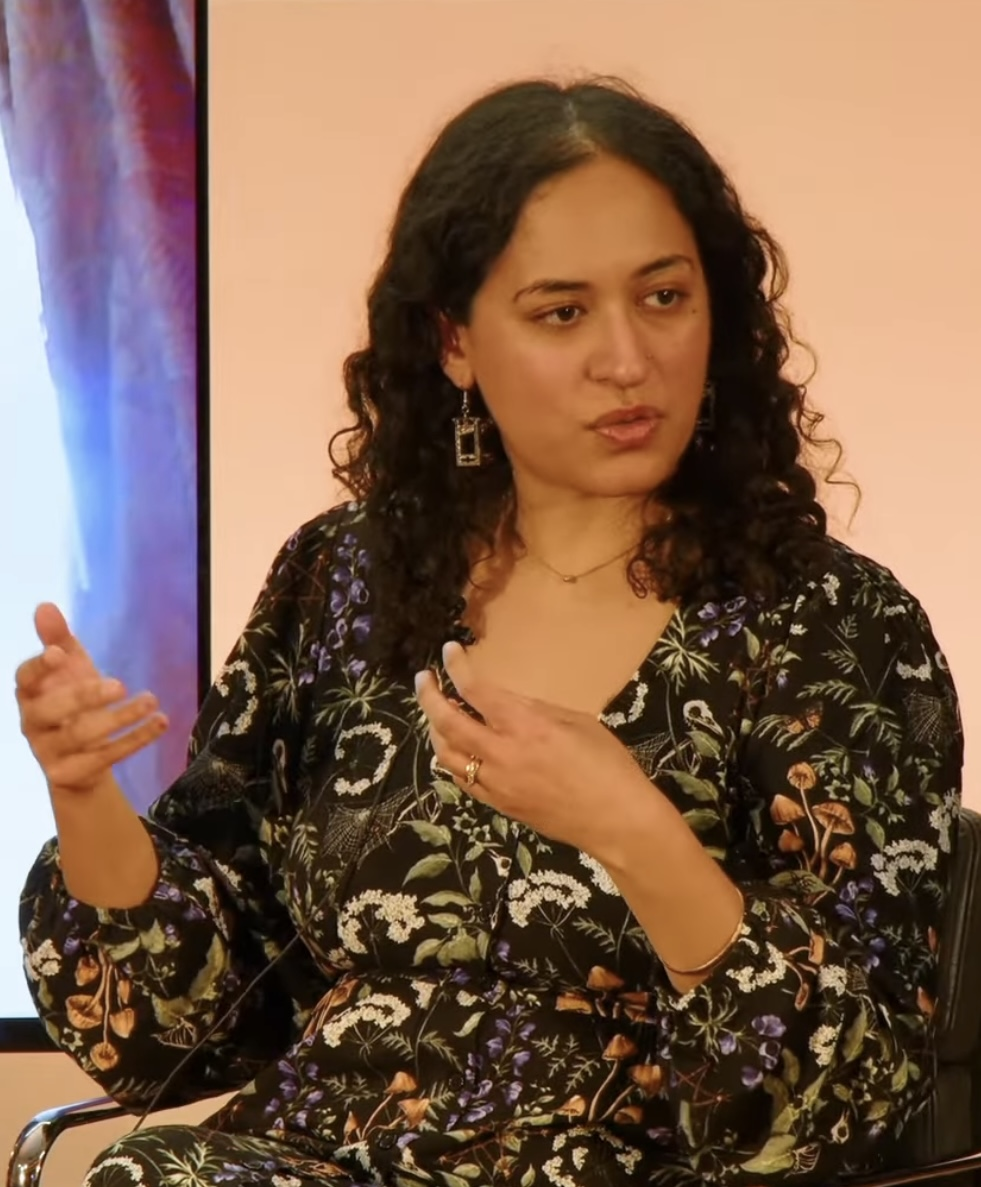
- Suri at the British Library in 2024
- Born: Harrow, London, England
- Education: University of Warwick
- Occupation: Author
- Writing career
- Years active: 2018–present
- Genres: speculative fiction, fantasy, gothic fiction, romantasy
- Notable awards: British Fantasy Award for Best Newcomer (2019); World Fantasy Award (2022)

Tasha Suri is a British Indian author and former academic librarian. Her debut novel, Empire of Sand, won the 2019 British Fantasy Award for Best Newcomer. In 2022, her novel The Jasmine Throne won the World Fantasy Award for Best Novel. Suri's most recent novel, The Isle in the Silver Sea, was listed as one of The New York Times "Best Romance Novels of 2025" and won the 2026 Aldiss Award.

== Early life and education ==
Suri was born in Harrow, London to Punjabi parents; they often returned to India on holiday. She studied English and creative writing at University of Warwick.

== Career ==
Formerly an academic librarian at Imperial College London, she is now a full-time writer and is represented by Catherine Cho at Paper Literary. She is a writing coach at The Novelry.

Suri's debut novel, Empire of Sand, was published by Orbit Books in 2018. It won the Sydney J. Bounds Best Newcomer Award at the 2019 British Fantasy Awards. The novel was listed by Time as one of "The 100 Best Fantasy Books of All Time" in 2020. Kirkus Reviews gave the book a starred review and said, "Suri’s deft and textured characterization breathes new life into these elements; she even takes a tired and often cloying trope—the triumph of the power of love—and makes it seem genuine, painful, and beautiful. A very strong start for a new voice."

Empire of Sand is the first novel in the Books of Ambha duology. Its sequel, Realm of Ash, also received a starred review from Kirkus Reviews praising the novel's "Sharp worldbuilding, authentic characters, and thoughtful explorations of prejudice and misogyny..." Liz Bourke at Reactor wrote "Realm of Ash is a compelling novel. Gorgeously written, deftly characterised, and packing a powerful impact into its 450-odd pages, it’s one of the most viscerally satisfying books I’ve read this year."

Her third novel, The Jasmine Throne, the first book in The Burning Kingdoms Trilogy, was published in 2021. In a starred review, Publishers Weekly called it "a fierce, heart-wrenching exploration of the value and danger of love in a world of politics and power..." The novel won the 2022 World Fantasy Award for Best Novel. The Burning Kingdoms Trilogy was a finalist for the 2025 Hugo Award for Best Series.

Suri's most recent novel, The Isle in the Silver Sea (2025) was listed as one of the "Best Romance Novels of 2025" by The New York Times. The novel received a starred review from Kirkus Reviews that described the book as "Beautifully inevitable and surprising at the same time; dark, sharp, clever, lovely." The novel won the 2026 Aldiss Award for Worldbuilding.

Her next standalone book, The Lady of Thorns, a gothic romantasy, is set to be published in 2027.

== Personal life ==
She lives in London with her family and identifies as queer.

== Bibliography ==
=== The Books of Ambha Duology ===
- Empire of Sand (2018)
- Realm of Ash (2019)

=== The Burning Kingdoms Trilogy ===
- The Jasmine Throne (2021)
- The Oleander Sword (2022)
- The Lotus Empire (2024)

=== Standalone Works ===
- The Isle in the Silver Sea (2025)
- The Lady in Thorns (2027)

=== Young Adult ===
- What Souls Are Made Of: A Wuthering Heights Remix (2022)

=== Media Tie-in ===
- Doctor Who: The Cradle (2023) (novella, part of the Decades Collection series celebrating the sixtieth anniversary of Doctor Who)

== See also ==
- List of fantasy authors
- List of LGBTQ writers
