= She Who Became the Sun =

2021 fantasy novel by Shelley Parker-Chan

- Author: Shelley Parker-Chan
- Audio read by: Natalie Naudus
- Cover artist: Jung Shang
- Language: English
- Series: The Radiant Emperor
- Release number: 1
- Genre: Historical fantasy
- Set in: 14th-century China
- Publisher: Tor Books (US); Mantle (UK)
- Publication date: July 20, 2021 (US); July 22, 2021 (UK)
- Publication place: United States; United Kingdom
- Pages: 410
- ISBN: 9781250621801 (hardcover 1st US ed.); 9781529043389 (hardcover 1st UK ed.)
- OCLC: 1182846103
- Dewey Decimal: 823/.92
- LC Class: PR9619.4.P369 S54 2021
- Followed by: He Who Drowned the World

She Who Became the Sun is a 2021 historical fantasy novel by Shelley Parker-Chan. Parker-Chan's debut novel, the work is a re-imagining of the rise to power of the Hongwu Emperor in the 14th century. A sequel, He Who Drowned the World, was published in 2023; the two books form The Radiant Emperor Duology.

The book won both the Best Novel and Best Newcomer awards at the British Fantasy Awards, and was a finalist for the Lambda Literary Award for Transgender Fiction and the Hugo Award for Best Novel, making Parker-Chan the first Australian to be a finalist for the latter award.

== Summary ==
The novel is set in 14th-century China, during the Mongolian Yuan Dynasty and the Red Turban Rebellions. In this historical reimagining, the Mandate of Heaven is a literal flame that can be summoned by the Emperor. With the Empire fracturing, both the Emperor and others with the power to challenge him can summon the Mandate of Heaven.

A local fortune teller describes the fate of two children from a peasant family. The son is told he will achieve greatness, while the daughter is told she will be nothing. However, after bandits kill their father, the son wastes away and dies. The daughter takes on her brother's name, Zhu Chongba, and pretends to be a boy in order to find refuge in a Buddhist monastery.

Zhu Chongba remains at the monastery for years, maintaining her disguise and eventually becoming ordained as a monk. When the abbot angers the Mongolians, the monastery is destroyed by General Ouyang. Zhu joins the Red Turbans. She rises to the rank of commander after a series of seemingly miraculous military victories.

Meanwhile, Ouyang, an ethnically Han man who was castrated and enslaved by the Mongolians because of his family's treason, plots to overthrow his rulers. This is complicated by Ouyang's love for Esen, the Mongolian prince he serves. Ouyang and Zhu have several military clashes; he eventually cuts off Zhu's hand, but allows her to live. Eventually, he orchestrates the death of both Esen and Esen's father, then turns his forces against the Mongolian Emperor.

Zhu Chongba believes that she must totally deny her female identity in order to seize her brother's destiny of greatness and avert the nothingness originally foretold for her. However, her point of view changes as her knowledge of feminine skills and insights into a woman's point of view continually provide her with opportunities to succeed. Zhu falls in love with and marries Ma Xiuying, who loves Zhu but is troubled by the violence inherent in Zhu's quest for power. Zhu gradually eliminates the other commanders of the Red Turbans, consolidating power for herself. Zhu captures the capital city and succeeds in summoning the Mandate of Heaven's flame. She is crowned King as Ma Xiuying watches on.

== Themes ==
The novel has been noted to touch on themes of gender, sexuality, and diasporic identity. In an interview with the South China Morning Post, Parker-Chan described the novel as "a queer reimagining of the rise to power of the founding emperor of the Ming dynasty. It’s also a fun story about gender," adding that mainstream white Australian culture had "a particular type of Australian masculinity that is held as the ideal. This excludes every other kind of masculinity, especially queer masculinity and Asian masculinity."

=== Inspiration ===
In an interview with SciFiNow, Parker-Chan commented on the inspiration for the novel,

"In my case, I was yearning for a sweeping, high stakes, historical epic with the hyper-emotionality of a romance — but which also queered gender roles. Asian historical TV dramas had a lot of the elements I craved but without the queerness. Chinese BL web novels got close, but they were… well, in Chinese. So at the end of the dinner, we all pledged to write the books of our hearts, commercial prospects be damned."

== Reception ==
She Who Became the Sun topped the Sunday Times Bestseller List. Writing for USA Today, Eliot Schrefer gave the book (3.5 / 4.0), saying that it was "an important debut that expands our concept of who gets to be a hero and a villain", but that it had a "restricted emotional range", as "scenes of kindness and compassion are nearly absent". Writing for Locus, Liz Bourke called the novel "expansive, epic novel, filled with political manoeuvering, armed conflict (and a lot of it), and intense emotions", and that there were few other novels that "attempts the same kind of re-imagining, and especially not such a queer re-imagining." Also writing for Locus, Alex Brown said that "fantasy elements aren’t as grand in this book as they might be in other epic fantasies" and that the "political scheming here makes the A Song of Ice and Fire series look like child’s play".

Lee Mandelo of Tor.com said the book was "propelled by the intense, grasping, often amoral desires of two queer protagonists whose deeply complicated relationships to gender and their bodies are center-stage" and that the novel pulled "no punches with its gnawing ethical quandaries about the foundations of empire". Publishers Weekly wrote that "though Parker-Chan’s unrelentingly grim view of humanity bogs down the middle of the novel, her nuanced exploration of gender identity and striking meditation on bodily autonomy set this fantasy apart". Yaameen Al-Muttaqi of The Daily Star wrote that the novel was "quite transparently a tale of identity: shaping your own space in a world that does not want you, and making that shape yours despite what others think you should be," and that the book had a sombre, introspective tone, "not concerned with the grand battles and heroic moments".

== Awards and nominations ==
She Who Became the Sun is the first novel by an Australian writer to be a finalist for the Hugo Award for Best Novel.

Year	Award	Category	Result	Ref.
2021	Aurealis Award	Fantasy Novel	Shortlisted	
2021	Goodreads Choice Awards	Debut Novel	Finalist	
2021	Goodreads Choice Awards	Fantasy	Finalist	
2022	British Fantasy Award	Fantasy Novel (Robert Holdstock Award)	Won	
2022	British Fantasy Award	Newcomer (Sydney J. Bounds Award)	Won	
2022	Hugo Award	Novel	Finalist	
2022	Lambda Literary Award	Transgender Fiction	Finalist	
2022	Locus Award	First Novel	Finalist	
