= The Mask Falling =

2021 supernatural dystopian novel

- Author: Samantha Shannon
- Language: English
- Series: The Bone Season
- Genre: Urban fantasy
- Published: 2021 (Bloomsbury)
- Publication date: January 27, 2021
- Publication place: United Kingdom
- ISBN: 9781408865576
- Preceded by: The Dawn Chorus
- Followed by: The Dark Mirror (2025)

The Mask Falling is a 2021 supernatural dystopian novel by British writer Samantha Shannon, the fourth in The Bone Season series.

== Plot synopsis ==
Dreamwalker Paige Mahoney is presumed dead, having escaped Scion London to seek shelter at safe house in the Scion Citadel of Paris. The Domino program has plans for Paige, whose bond with her former captor Arcturus Mesarthim is growing ever stronger. Paige works with Arcturus as she goes on a journey through the French underworld, seeking to escalate her fledgling rebellion while coming to terms with her own ordeal.

== Reception ==
The Guardian's Lisa Tuttle lists The Mask Falling among the best recent science fiction and fantasy, applauding its "uniquely different and complex setting". The novel was a Sunday Times Bestseller.

Prior to publication, Grazia named The Mask Falling among the most anticipated books of 2021, commenting, "Fiercely intelligent and articulate, Samantha Shannon ha been blazing a trail for a new generation of feminist fantasy authors."

The American Library Association's Donna Seaman writes "For all its superbly choreographed action and paranormal inventiveness [The Mask Falling] is is, at heart, a gripping tale of trust and love, valor and sacrifice, and equality and justice."

Publishers Weekly said of The Mask Falling, "Shannon expertly blends genres to create a story that is at once a political thriller, a dystopian epic, and a paranormal adventure".

Kirkus Reviews calls The Mask Falling "A tantalizing, strategic setup for the next installment, which has all the ingredients to be a knockout."
