= Sandra Zellmer =

American lawyer

Sandra B. Zellmer is an American lawyer, currently the Robert B. Daugherty Professor of Law at University of Nebraska College of Law and formerly holding the Hevelone Research Chair (2006–2007) and McCollum Research Chair (2008–2009).
