= The Song Rising =

2017 novel by Samantha Shannon

- First edition cover
- Author: Samantha Shannon
- Cover artist: Ivan Belikov
- Language: English
- Series: The Bone Season
- Genre: Dystopian
- Published: 2017 (Bloomsbury)
- Publication place: United Kingdom
- ISBN: 978-1-526-67600-9
- Preceded by: The Mime Order
- Followed by: The Dawn Chorus

The Song Rising is a dystopian fantasy novel by British writer Samantha Shannon, originally published by Bloomsbury Publishing in 2017. It is a direct sequel to The Mime Order and the third instalment in the Bone Season series.

In 2024, Shannon released the Author's Preferred Text of The Song Rising.

== Plot ==
Following a battle for the Rose Crown, Paige Mahoney has risen to the position of Underqueen, ruling over the clairvoyant syndicate of London. But with vengeful enemies, stabilising the fractured underworld will be challenging.

As Paige rallies her army of criminals, she continues to meet in secret with her former enemy, Arcturus Mesarthim. Should they be discovered, the fragile alliance with the Ranthen will fail.

But all bets are off when Scion introduces Senshield, a deadly technology that spells doom for clairvoyants. Now Paige must race against the clock to stop her reign ending in blood.

== Reception ==
Kirkus Reviews called The Song Rising "never less than captivating," and "a tantalizing, otherworldy adventure with imagination that burns like fire." Publishers Weekly found that the "narrative is fueled by a constant sense of tension, as well as both internal and external conflict," and yet that "some of the mythology related to the otherworldly Rephaim remains hard to grasp, somewhat diminishing the story’s overall strength."

The Scotsman was particularly impressed with how Shannon evokes the cities and places in the novel, and that the narrative of The Song Rising, including scenes of torture and deprivation, "make this series of books easily the most politically engaged of any of the contemporary dystopian fantasies."
