= Samantha Shannon =

British writer (born 1991)

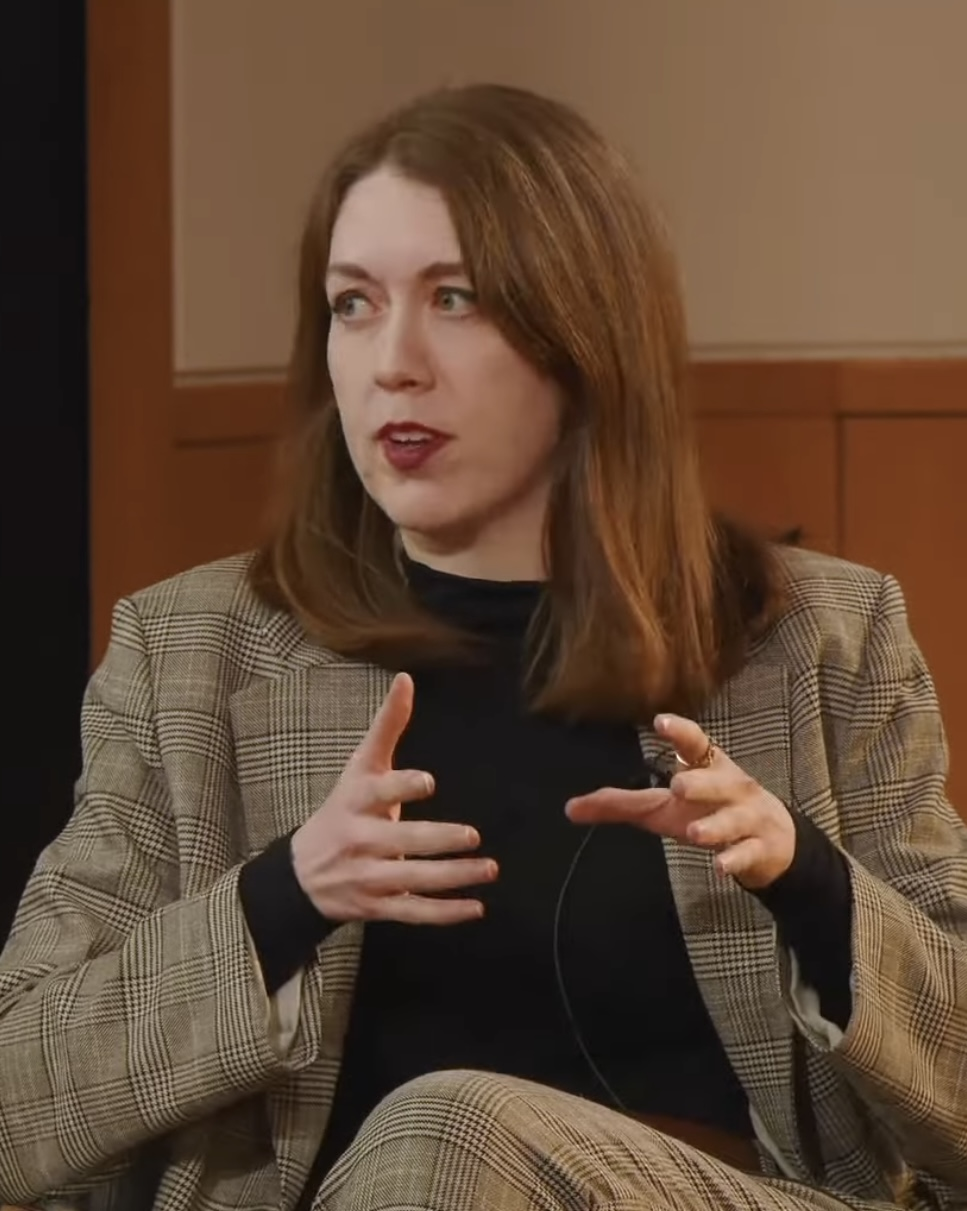
- Shannon at the British Library in 2024
- Born: 8 November 1991 (age 34); Hammersmith, London, England
- Occupation: Writer
- Writing career
- Genres: Dystopian, fantasy, paranormal
- Notable works: The Bone Season, The Priory of the Orange Tree
- Website: www.samanthashannon.co.uk

Samantha Shannon-Jones (born 8 November 1991) is a British author of queer dystopian and fantasy fiction. Her debut novel, The Bone Season, was published in 2013, and is the first of a seven-book series. Shannon's first novel outside of The Bone Season, The Priory of the Orange Tree, was one of Bloomsbury's bestselling books of 2022 and has sold over a million copies to date.

== Life and career ==
Shannon was born in Hammersmith, London, in November 1991 and grew up in Ruislip. She first began writing at the age of fifteen, when she wrote her first novel, Aurora, which remains unpublished. Shannon studied English Language and Literature at St Anne's College, Oxford and graduated in 2013. She is of Irish descent on her father's side, her ancestors emigrating to England from County Roscommon.

=== The Bone Season ===
In 2012, she signed a six-figure book deal with Bloomsbury Publishing, who bid following the London Book Fair, to publish the first three books in a seven-book series, beginning with The Bone Season. Set in 2059, it follows Paige Mahoney, a "dreamwalker" resisting the Republic of Scion, which has led an oppressive campaign against clairvoyants for two centuries. Following its publication, Shannon was compared favourably to J. K. Rowling.

Film and TV rights to The Bone Season were first optioned by The Imaginarium Studios in November 2012, with Andy Serkis slated to produce, and by British production company Lunar Park in 2019.

=== The Roots of Chaos ===
The Priory of the Orange Tree, a standalone high fantasy by Shannon, was published in February 2019 by Bloomsbury Publishing. A reimagining of the legend of Saint George and the Dragon, it was named by Collider as a sapphic book that should be turned into a show or movie. A prequel, A Day of Fallen Night, was published in February 2023. Shannon has called the series The Roots of Chaos, having originally planned to only write one book within the universe and later stating that there were more stories to tell. In 2025, Shannon released Among the Burning Flowers, a prequel to The Priory of the Orange Tree.

In 2022, Shannon signed a contract for a third book in the Roots of Chaos cycle and a story inspired by the Greek goddess Iris.

== Personal life ==
Shannon has lifelong Visual Snow Syndrome and developed bilateral tinnitus in 2025. She identifies as sapphic.

== Bibliography ==
=== The Bone Season series ===
- The Bone Season (2013)
- The Mime Order (2015)
- The Song Rising (2017)
- The Mask Falling (2021)
- The Dark Mirror (2025)
- The Moth Reborn (2027)

Related works

- On the Merits of Unnaturalness (companion) (2015)
- The Pale Dreamer (novella)(2016)
- The Dawn Chorus (novella) (2020)

=== The Roots of Chaos series ===
- The Priory of the Orange Tree (2019)
- A Day of Fallen Night (2023)
- Among the Burning Flowers (2025)

=== Short stories ===
- Amrita (2013)
- "Marigold" in Because You Love to Hate Me: 13 Tales of Villainy, edited by Amerie (2017)
