= Gluttons (band) =

American rock band

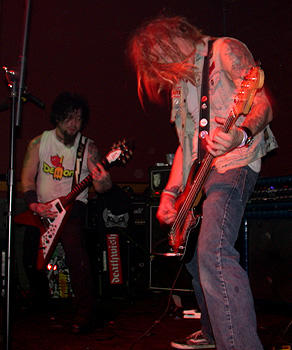

Background information
- Origin: Cleveland, Ohio, U.S.
- Genres: Heavy metal, punk rock
- Years active: 2002–present
- Members: Human Furnace; Kevin Orr; Chris Dora; Ed Stephens; Damien Perry
- Past members: Brook Murray; Eric Zellmer; Shaun Vanek

Gluttons is an American rock band formed in Cleveland, Ohio, United States, in 2002. The band has been described as a combination of Motörhead and the Misfits. Gluttons have released several demos and live albums independently, and a self-titled 7" on A389 Recordings in 2009. They have also been featured on several compilation discs. Guitarist/vocalist Human Furnace also plays in Cleveland hardcore band Ringworm. Guitarist Damien Perry (of Red Giant) also plays in Cleveland band The Great Iron Snake, Ed Stephens plays bass in Ringworm, Shok Paris and Destructor, and vocalist Kevin Orr also sings for Strange Notes.

== Members ==
=== Current ===
- Human Furnace – vocals, guitar
- Chris Dora – drums
- Kevin Orr – vocals
- Ed Stephens – bass
- Aaron Dowell – lead guitar

=== Former members ===
- Brook Murray – guitar
- Eric Zellmer – drums
- Shawn Vanek - guitar
- Damien Perry - guitar

== Select discography ==
- Cleveland Ain't It Fun -"Black Falcon" (compilation) – 2003
- Spent All Money on Booze, Broads and Drugs... The Rest I Squandered Away (demo) – 2003
- The Baddest Shit North of Hell (demo) – 2004
- Live Vol. 1 – 2005
- Live at the Jigsaw – 2006
- Hard Times in Cleveland: Spitfire Compilation -"Bar Fight" – 2008
- "Gluttons" 7" (A389 Recordings) – 2009
- GLUTTONS - G.F.F.G. (SONIC POTENTIAL RECORDS) - 2018
- GLUTTONS - Sel-Titled EP - (SONIC POTENTIAL RECORDS) 2019
- GLUTTONS - DOUBLE FEATURE EP - (SONIC POTENTIAL RECORDS) 2021
- GLUTTONS - TWIN KILLER EP - (SONIC POTENTIAL RECORDS) 2021
- GLUTTONS - SNAKE EYES EP - (SONIC POTENTIAL RECORDS) 2022
- GLUTTONS - POCKET ACES EP - (SONIC POTENTIAL RECORDS) 2024
