= Kat Solar =

American singer

- Birth name: Katrina Connor
- Born: Detroit, United States
- Genres: Pop
- Years active: 2012–present

Katrina Connor, known professionally as Kat Solar, is an American singer based in Detroit.

== Career ==
Her debut studio album, Snake Eyes, was released in 2012.

In 2015, she released her second studio album, Infinity, along with the title track as the album's first single. A music video for the single was released on June 25, 2015, and was described by Digital Journal as "futuristic and whimsical".

== Discography ==
=== As lead artist ===
Title	Year	Peak chart positions	Album
Title	Year	US Club	Album
"Infinity"	2015	18	Non-album singles
"Get Away"	2018	46	Non-album singles
