= Shelley Parker-Chan =

Australian fantasy novelist

Shelley Parker-Chan is a non-binary, Australian fantasy novelist best known for their debut novel, She Who Became the Sun, and its sequel, He Who Drowned the World, which form The Radiant Emperor Duology.

== Early life and career ==
Parker-Chan was born in New Zealand to a Malaysian-Chinese mother and a white father. They were raised in Australia, where they felt disconnected with their racial identity and with the stereotypical representation of Asian characters in fiction. They say in interview: "I was raised very much by a tiger parent in a part of Adelaide with a large Chinese, Malaysian and Southeast Asian Chinese population. I was a scholarship kid and I went to a posh private school where my peers were all the offspring of doctors and lawyers, and I was pushed to also become a doctor or lawyer and achieve high results. So I feel I grew up in a very classically second- generation middle-class Asian way, but I was definitely not perceived as Asian."

When they moved to Asia as a young adult, they discovered Asian dramas, and began to understand that "...Asians could be any and every kind of character: the heroes, the villains, the love interests, warriors, scholars."

They did graduate work on the subjects of war crimes and restorative justice, and worked as a diplomat, representing the Australian Department of Foreign Affairs and Trade in Timor-Leste, and as an international development adviser for gender equality and LGBTQ rights in Indonesia, before becoming a writer. Their interest in writing novels began with romantic fan fiction, and a desire for better queer representation in literature.

In 2021, Mantle Books published She Who Became the Sun, which became a Sunday Times Number 1 bestseller, won several awards, and has been translated into 15 languages. This was followed in 2023 by He Who Drowned the World, which concludes the Radiant Emperor duology.

== Personal life ==
Parker-Chan uses they/them pronouns, is queer and genderqueer, and was named after Romantic poet Percy Bysshe Shelley. As of 2023, they live in Melbourne, Australia. They are married and have a daughter.

== Awards ==
Parker-Chan won the 2022 Astounding Award for Best New Writer and the British Fantasy Award (the Robert Holdstock Award for Best Fantasy Novel and the Sydney J. Bounds Award for Best Newcomer).

Year	Work	Award	Category	Result	Ref
2021	She Who Became the Sun	Aurealis Award	Fantasy Novel	Shortlisted	
2021	She Who Became the Sun	Goodreads Choice Awards	Debut Novel	Nominated—6th	
2021	She Who Became the Sun	Goodreads Choice Awards	Fantasy	Nominated—4th	
2021	She Who Became the Sun	Indie Next List	August	—	
2021	She Who Became the Sun	Otherwise Award	—	Honor List	
2022	She Who Became the Sun	Astounding Award	—	Won	
2022	She Who Became the Sun	British Book Award	Debut Book of the Year	Shortlisted	
2022	She Who Became the Sun	British Fantasy Award	Fantasy Novel (Robert Holdstock Award)	Won	
2022	She Who Became the Sun	British Fantasy Award	Newcomer (Sydney J. Bounds Award)	Won	
2022	She Who Became the Sun	Ditmar Award	Novel	Shortlisted	
2022	She Who Became the Sun	Dragon Award	Alternate History Novel	Shortlisted	
2022	She Who Became the Sun	Hugo Award	Novel	Shortlisted	
2022	She Who Became the Sun	Lambda Literary Award	Transgender Fiction	Shortlisted	
2022	She Who Became the Sun	Locus Award	First Novel	Nominated—2nd	
2023	He Who Drowned the World	Indie Next List	?	—	
2024	He Who Drowned the World	Dragon Award	Fantasy Novel	Shortlisted	
2024	He Who Drowned the World	Locus Award	Fantasy Novel	Nominated	

== Bibliography ==
=== The Radiant Emperor Duology ===
- She Who Became the Sun. Pan. 2021. ISBN 9781529043402.
- He Who Drowned the World. Pan. 2023. ISBN 9781529043457.
