= Joseph D'Lacey =

British author

Joseph D’Lacey
- Occupation: Novelist
- Writing career
- Language: English
- Subjects: Fantasy, science fiction, horror
- Notable work: MEAT
- Notable awards: Sydney J. Bounds Award for Best Newcomers

Joseph D’Lacey is a British author, known for his science fiction, fantasy and horror stories, many of which have environmental themes. In 2008, his first published novel, MEAT, gained him the British Fantasy Award for Best Newcomer.

He currently resides in Northamptonshire with his wife and daughter.

== Bibliography ==
=== Novels ===
==== The Black Dawn ====
- Black Feathers (2013)
- The Book of the Crowman (2014)

==== Others ====
- MEAT (2008)
- Garbage Man (2009)
- The Kill Crew (2009)
- Snake Eyes (2012)
- Blood Fugue (2012)
- Roadkill (2013)
- The Veil: Testaments (Parts I & II) (2016)

=== Anthologies ===
- Splinters
