= Hannah Kaner =

English fantasy novelist

- Born: Hannah Frances Kaner; 1992/1993
- Education: Pembroke College, Cambridge; University of Edinburgh
- Years active: 2021–present
- Website: www.hannahkaner.com

Hannah Frances Kaner (born 1992/1993) is an English fantasy novelist. Her debut fantasy novel Godkiller (2023), the first in the Fallen Gods trilogy, became a #1 Sunday Times bestseller. This was followed by its sequel, Sunbringer (2024). Her third book, Faithbreaker, was published in 2025.

Kaner's work was inspired by the resilience of "angry women" and reflects feminist ideas, as well as themes related to the LGBTQIA+ and disabled communities.

== Early life ==
Kaner is from Northumberland and attended the King Edward VI School in Morpeth. She graduated with a degree in English from Pembroke College, Cambridge in 2014 and then a Master of Science (MSc) from the University of Edinburgh.

== Career ==
In November 2021, HarperVoyager acquired the rights to publish Kaner's debut fantasy novel Godkiller, the first in the Fallen Gods trilogy, in early 2023. Godkiller debuted at #1 on the Sunday Times bestseller list in the hardback category and was shortlisted for the 2024 Astounding Award, the British Book Award, the Locus Award, and the British Fantasy Award. It was also long-listed for the Goldsboro Books Glass Bell Award. The novel was later an inaugural Waterstones Science Fiction and Fantasy (SFF) Book of the Month in January 2024. Godkiller was followed by a sequel, Sunbringer, in 2024. The third and final installment in the Fallen Gods trilogy, Faithbreaker, was published in 2025.

HarperVoyager acquired Kaner's second trilogy in a six-figure deal announced in October 2025. The first novel in the trilogy, A Snake Among Swans, is expected to be released in July 2026.

== Personal life ==
Kaner is married and lives in Edinburgh.

== Bibliography ==
=== Fallen Gods trilogy ===
- Godkiller (2023)
- Sunbringer (2024)
- Faithbreaker (2025)

=== Wing and the Ways series ===
- A Snake Among Swans (2026)

== Accolades ==
Year	Award	Category	Title	Result	Ref
2024	Astounding Award for Best New Writer		Godkiller	Shortlisted	
2024	British Book Awards	Debut Book of the Year	Godkiller	Shortlisted	
2024	Locus Awards	Best First Novel	Godkiller	5th	
2024	Glass Bell Award		Godkiller	Longlisted	
2024	British Fantasy Awards	Best Newcomer	Godkiller	Shortlisted	
