= Glossary of craps terms =

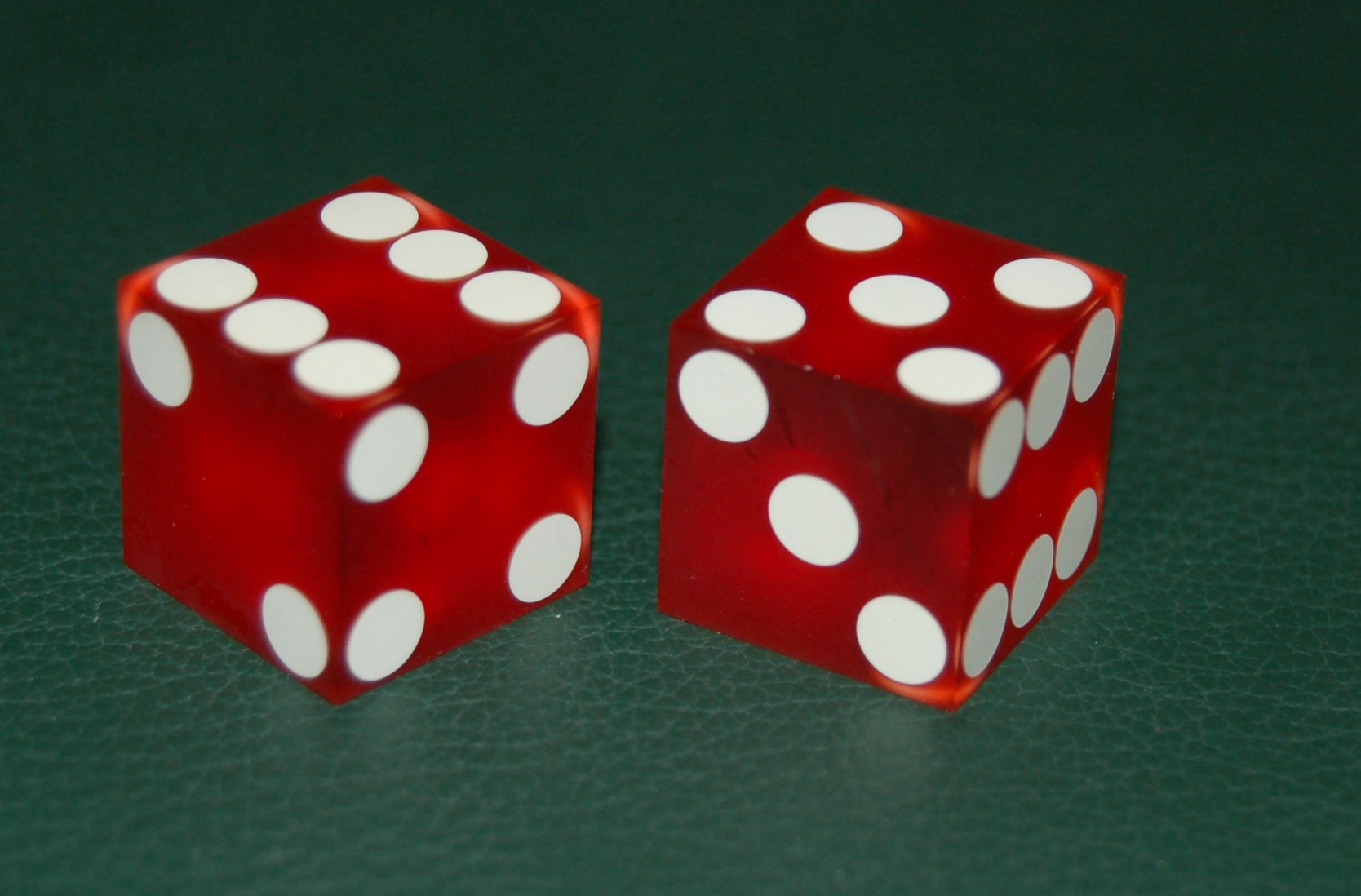
Craps dice

The following is a glossary of terms used in the dice game craps. Besides the terms listed here, there are many common and uncommon craps slang terms.

== A ==
ace deuce

A roll of 3

aces

A roll of 2 (each roll of one is an ace), see also: Snake Eyes

== B ==
ballerina

A roll of or bet on double-2 (a pun for two-two as in tutu)

Big Red

The number 7 or a bet for any 7 to appear

bones

A slang term for the dice

box numbers

The place numbers (4,5,6,8,9,10)

boxcars

A roll of or bet on 12

== C ==
center field

Nine, often called Center Field Nine

change only

when a player buys into a game specifically with cash, the "only" means no bets are being placed at the time of the buy in. Can also be used when a player colours in. (Dealers will say this out loud so that a player can't take a shot and say he wanted a bet on X.)

Cheque change

Breaking down a chip into smaller denomination chips.

colour up

The process of changing denominations of chips to larger denominations

cold dice

also known as a cold table; an expression used when players are not hitting the established point and sevening out

come out

1. The initial roll of the shooter
2. To roll the dice when no point has been established

crap out

To roll a 2, 3, or 12 on the come out roll. A player betting on the Pass line or Come loses on crap out, but the roll does not lose when a point is established. Don't Pass and Don't Come wins if a 2 or 3 craps is rolled on come out, but ties (pushes) if a 12 is rolled on come out. The shooter may continue rolling after crapping out.

craps

the numbers 2, 3, and/or 12

== D ==
double pitch

In dice control, when the dice stay on axis which rarely occurs (less than 5% of the rolls), but one turns two faces more than the other. If players set the dice with the same face, such as a hard ways or 3V set, the roll may likely result in a seven.

down

To remove or reduce a bet, players often say "take it down"

== E ==
easy way

Rolling an even number with any combination other than doubles. Applies to 4, 6, 8, and 10 only.

even money

Any bet that pays out at 1:1.

== F ==
fever five

A roll of 5, also called five fever

free odds

Simply known as odds, is the odds which can be taken or laid behind the Pass/Come or Don't Pass/Don't Come. These are paid at true odds.

flea

A player who bets at or near table minimum, normally for extended periods of time.

== G ==
garden

Slang for the field bet

George

A good tipper

== H ==
hand

Describes a shooter's complete turn at the dice. It starts with the come-out roll and ends when the shooter eventually "sevens out" (rolls a 7 after a point has been established) and passes the dice to the next player.

hard way

Rolling a 4, 6, 8, 10 with a pair of the same number. Sometimes also known as "hard six", "hard eight", et cetera

hi-lo

a single roll bet for 2 or 12

hi-lo-yo

a single roll bet for 2, 11, or 12

high

A bet on or roll of 12, also see boxcars

hop

A single roll bet for a specific combination of dice to come out. Pays 15:1 for easy ways and 30:1 for hard ways

horn

A divided bet on the 2, 3, 11, 12

horn high

A horn bet with addition units going to a specific number. For example "horn high ace deuce" would generally mean a 5 unit bet with 2 units going on the 3.

hot dice

also known as a hot table; an expression used when players are hitting the established points or rolling for long durations without seven outs

== I ==
inside numbers

betting on the 5, 6, 8, 9

== L ==
lay

To bet on a seven to come before a specific point number. Lays are paid at true odds with commission taken.

lay odds

To give odds behind a Don't Pass or Don't Come. Betting against the shooter

Little Joe

Point 4

low

a single roll bet for a 2

== M ==
mechanic

A shooter who allegedly implements dice control

midnight

A roll of or bet on 12

== N ==
natural

Rolling a 7 or 11 on the come out roll

Nina

Rolling or betting on a 9

== O ==
Off

1. The come out roll; when no point has been established
2. To have a bet on the table but not in play. The bet can not be won from or lost when it is Off.

On

1. When a point has been established
2. A bet that is in play (working).

outside numbers

betting on the 4, 5, 9, 10

== P ==
parlay

To parlay a bet is to take all the winnings from the previous bet (or up to maximum allowed for bet if winnings exceed maximum) and add it to the next bet.

press

To double a bet, players generally say "press it" when doubling a bet, players can also press an additional one or more units and can increase the bet less than the original bet by saying "press X units"

push

a tie

== S ==
same bet

To keep the previous winning bet as is. If a player says same bet it does not mean to double the bet, that is referred to as "pressing it"

seven out

A roll of 7 when the point is On. All bets on Pass, Pass Odds, Come, Come Odds, Place bets, Buy bets, hard ways and any single roll bets not for a seven loses. All bets on Don't Pass, Don't Pass Odds, Don't Come, Don't Come Odds, Lay bets and any single roll bets for a seven wins.

snake eyes

A roll of 2

Steven

A player who leans over the table too much

stroker

A player who makes bets overly complicated and/or gives dealers unnecessary additional work

== T ==
take odds

To bet odds behind a Pass or Come. Betting with the shooter

take down

See down

true odds

The real odds for payout where house edge is 0%

== W ==
working

A bet which is in play and can be won or lost.

whirl

A five-unit bet that is a combination of a horn and any-seven bet, with the idea that if a seven is rolled the bet is a push, because the money won on the seven is lost on the horn portions of the bet. The combine odds are 26:5 on the 2, 12, 11:5 on the 3, 11, and a push on the 7.

world

See whirl

wrong way bettor

When a person is betting against the shooter on the Don't Pass Line.

== Y ==
yo

A roll or bet on 11 (six-five, or five-six), short for Yo-leven
