= South Pasadena =

South Pasadena is the name of two places in the United States:

- South Pasadena, California
- South Pasadena, Florida

== See also ==
- Pasadena (disambiguation)
