= Blackjack Switch =

Casino gambling game

Blackjack Switch is a casino gambling game invented by Geoff Hall and patented in 2009. It is based on blackjack, but differs in that two hands, rather than one, are dealt to each playing position, and the player is initially allowed to exchange ("switch") the top two cards between hands. Natural blackjacks are paid 1:1 instead of the standard 3:2, and a dealer hard 22 pushes all player hands except a natural.

== History ==
Blackjack Switch was conceived after Hall - who was a card counter at the time - became frustrated at being dealt 2 weak hands when playing Blackjack that could be improved dramatically if the top two cards were allowed to be switched. Hall then developed this idea and exhibited the game at the G2E conference in Las Vegas in October 2000. Blackjack Switch was installed in Harvey’s Casino in Iowa in February 2001. After this Hall modified the game to include the ‘Push on 22’ rule in 2003. This modification led to the game being installed in Four Queens in December 2003. The game has since become widely available in offline casinos in Las Vegas and around the world and is offered online only by Playtech casinos. Further games developed by Hall that are found in Las Vegas casinos include Free Bet Blackjack, Zombie Blackjack, and Zappit.

== Play ==
Blackjack Switch is played with four, six or eight 52-card decks which are shuffled together. The shuffled cards are dealt from a dealing shoe or a shuffling machine.

A semicircular card table with a similar layout to blackjack is used. Each playing position has two betting boxes, rather than one, and the initial wagers in these two boxes must be identical. However, each corresponds to a separate hand; during play they may be doubled and split independently, and are resolved separately.

In the initial deal, the dealer puts one card face up on each box of each playing position starting from his left, deals a face-up card to himself, and then a further card to each box left to right. After resolving any side bet, the dealer then consults each player in turn, initially asking them whether they wish to "switch" their top cards. For example, if the player is dealt 10-5 and 6-10, then the player may switch to transform the two hands into 10-10 and 6-5. After a player has made a decision whether or not to switch, the dealer offers him the chance to hit, stand or double, firstly for the hand on the player's right-hand box, then for the one on the left. As in blackjack, a player hand which exceeds 21 is "bust"; its cards are removed and its backing wager acquired by the house.

When all players have been consulted, the dealer plays out his hand according to blackjack-style drawing rules, with the difference that a dealer hand of 22 is not a bust but a push (a tie) against any surviving player hand; the only exception is a player blackjack which has not been obtained by switching or splitting.

The small variations in dealer drawing rules between casinos which are found in blackjack are also found in Blackjack Switch, such as whether the dealer must stand or hit on soft 17 (a hand totalling 17 but containing an ace counted as 11. A-6 or A-3-3, for example), whether even money/insurance is offered, whether a player may double after a split, and whether a player may hit split aces.

== Strategy ==
The strategy of Blackjack Switch covers both the switch decision and the subsequent decisions of whether to stand, double, or draw a further card which are familiar from blackjack strategy.

=== The switch decision ===
The correct decision regarding whether to switch is sometimes obvious, particularly when there is the largest difference in advantage. However, borderline and counter-intuitive cases are relatively common, and switching strategy is hard to summarize. While an often-quoted rule of thumb is to choose the option that forms or preserves the best single hand, this is unreliable; sometimes it is even correct to break up a natural by switching, for instance in the case AT + T[3-8] vs. dealer 7, 8 or 9. The correct switching choice depends on the dealer card in a significant minority of cases. Near-optimal schemes which can be learned have been developed by several authors: Arnold Snyder presents a protocol for switching decisions based on four categories of hand, "winner", "push", "loser" and "chance" which he claims reduces the house edge to 0.25% under his ruleset. Cindy Liu presents a scheme based on assigning a point value to the dealt hands and those produced by switching.

=== Basic strategy after the switch decision ===
Basic strategy for playing out blackjack switch hands, after the switching decision has been made, is tabulated below, for a game in which the dealer hits soft 17 and peeks for blackjack. Compared to traditional blackjack, in Blackjack Switch there are fewer occasions where doubling or splitting is rewarding, and more occasions where it is correct to hit at the risk of going bust. The differences originate from the push-on-dealer-22 rule.

Player's hand	Dealer's face-up card									
Player's hand	2	3	4	5	6	7	8	9	10	A
Hard totals
17-20	S	S	S	S	S	S	S	S	S	S
14-16	S	S	S	S	S	H	H	H	H	H
13	H	S	S	S	S	H	H	H	H	H
12	H	H	H	S	S	H	H	H	H	H
11	D	D	D	D	D	D	D	D	H	H
10	D	D	D	D	D	D	D	H	H	H
9	H	H	H	H	D	H	H	H	H	H
5-8	H	H	H	H	H	H	H	H	H	H
Soft totals
	2	3	4	5	6	7	8	9	10	A
A,8, A,9	S	S	S	S	S	S	S	S	S	S
A,7	S	S	S	D	D	S	S	H	H	H
A,6	H	H	H	D	D	H	H	H	H	H
A,5	H	H	H	H	D	H	H	H	H	H
A,2-A,4	H	H	H	H	H	H	H	H	H	H
Pairs
	2	3	4	5	6	7	8	9	10	A
A, A	SP	SP	SP	SP	SP	SP	SP	SP	SP	SP
10,10	S	S	S	S	S	S	S	S	S	S
9,9	S	S	SP	SP	SP	S	SP	SP	S	S
8,8	SP	SP	SP	SP	SP	SP	SP	SP	H	H
7,7	S	SP	SP	SP	SP	SP	H	H	H	H
6,6	H	H	SP	SP	SP	H	H	H	H	H
5,5	D	D	D	D	D	D	D	H	H	H
4,4	H	H	H	H	H	H	H	H	H	H
2,2 3,3	H	H	H	SP	SP	SP	H	H	H	H

Key:

S = Stand
H = Hit
D = Double
SP = Split

== Side bet ==
Blackjack Switch tables typically allow a side bet, called Super Match, which rewards pairs, three-of-a-kind, two-pairs or four-of-a-kind among the four initial cards comprising the players two hands. For a 6-deck game, the Super Match bet pays out 1 to 1 if there a pair is present, 5 to 1 for three of a kind, 8 to 1 for two pairs and 40 to 1 for four of a kind. This seems to mitigate the adverse effect on the player of the case where the two top or bottom cards are identical, which robs the player of a meaningful switching decision, although, like most side bets, playing it increases the house edge.
