= Craps =

Dice game

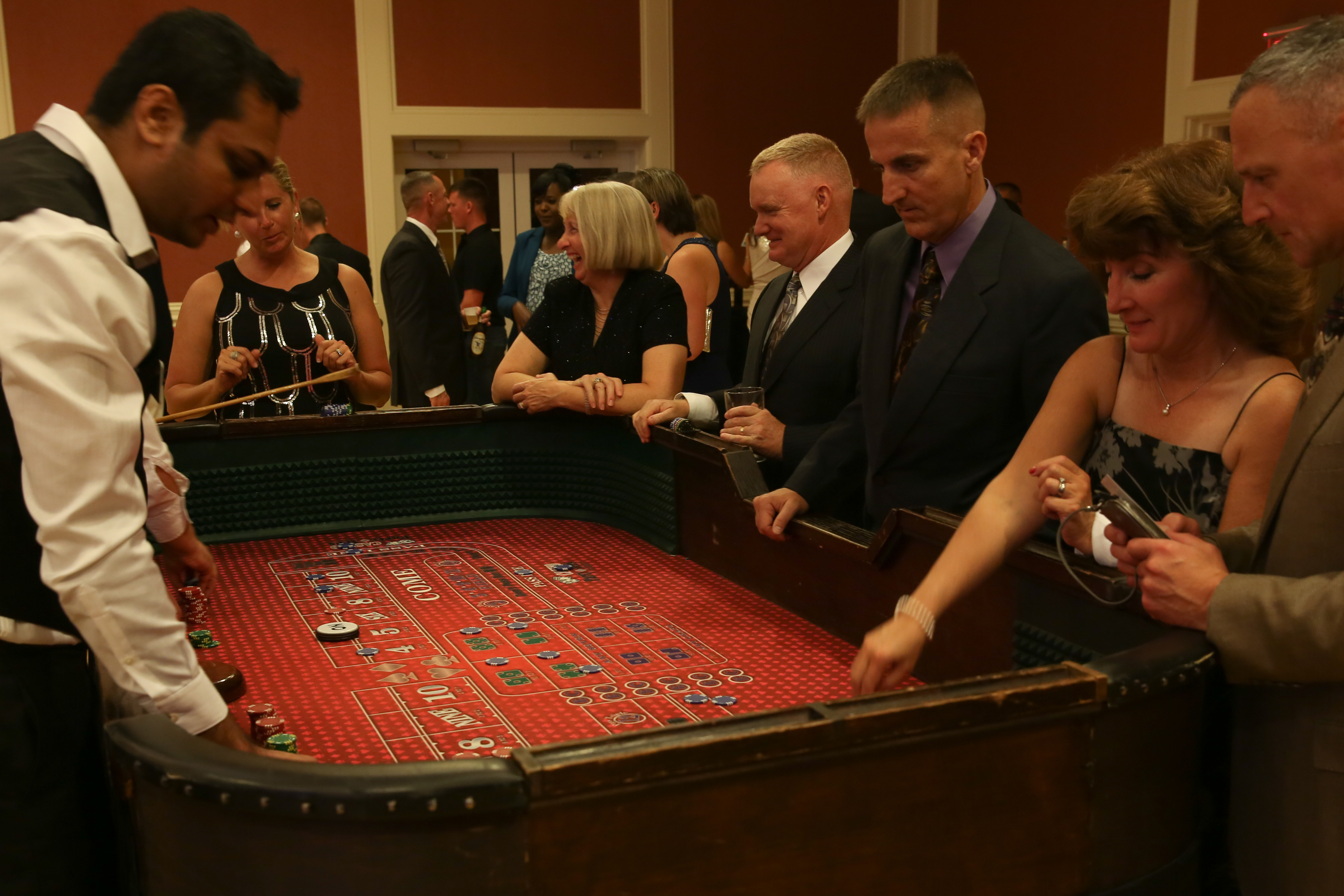
- A craps table with a game in progress
- Other names: Seven-Eleven
- Genres: Dice game
- Chance: High

Craps is a dice game in which players bet on the outcomes of the roll of a pair of dice. Players can wager money against each other (playing "street craps") or against a bank ("casino craps"). Because it requires little equipment, "street craps" can be played in informal settings. While shooting craps, players may use slang terminology to place bets and actions.

== History ==
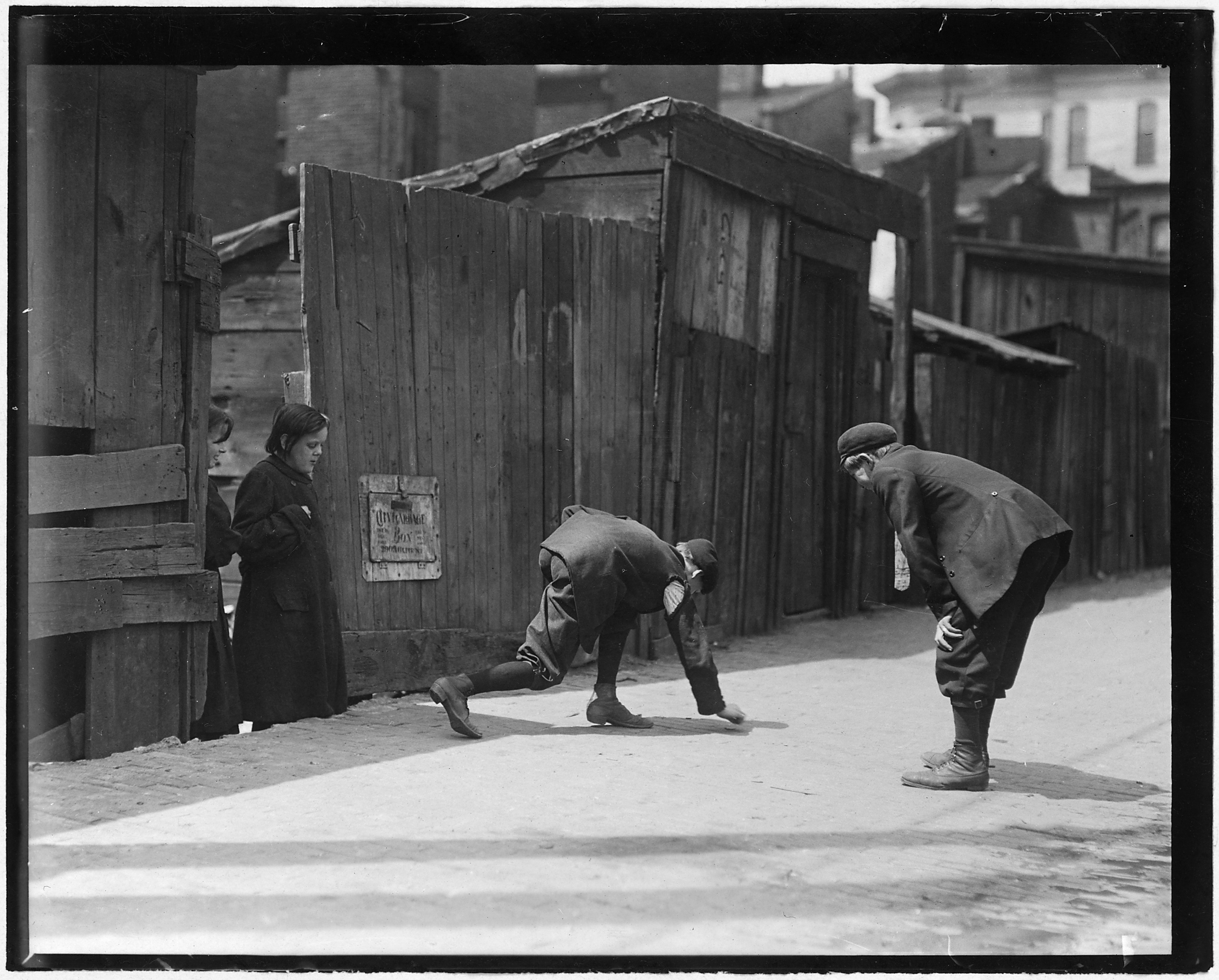
Craps being played by children in a street in St Louis, Missouri, circa 1912

Craps developed in the United States from a simplification of the western European game of Hazard, also spelled Hazzard or Hasard. The origins of Hazard are obscure and may date to the Crusades; a detailed description of Hazard was provided by Edmond Hoyle in Hoyle's Games, Improved (1790). At approximately the same time (1788), "Krabs" was documented as a French variation on Hazard.

In aristocratic London, crabs was the epithet for the sum combinations of two and three for two rolled dice, which in Hazard are instant-losing numbers for the first dice roll, regardless of the shooter's selected main number. The name craps is derived from the corruption of this term crabs (or Krabs) to creps and then craps.

According to some accounts, Hazard was brought from London to New Orleans in approximately 1805 by the returning Bernard Xavier Philippe de Marigny de Mandeville, the young gambler and scion of a family of wealthy landowners in colonial Louisiana. Hazard allows the dice shooter to choose any number from five to nine as their "main" number; in a pamphlet published in 1933, Edward Tinker claimed that Marigny simplified the game by making the main always seven, which is the mathematically optimal choice, i.e., the choice with the lowest disadvantage for the shooter. However, more recent research indicates that Marigny played an unmodified version of Hazard, which had been played in the United States since at least the 1600s. Instead, John Scarne credits anonymous Black American inventors with simplifying and streamlining Hazard, increasing the pace of the game and adding a variety of wagers.

Regardless of who deserves credit for simplifying Hazard, the game initially was called Pass from the French word pas (meaning "pace" or "step"), and was popularized by the underclass starting in the early 19th century. Field hands taught their friends and deckhands, who carried the new game up the Mississippi River and its tributaries, although the game was never popular amongst the riverboat gamblers. Marigny gave the name Rue de Craps to a street in his new subdivision in New Orleans; in that city, craps experienced a resurgence of popularity in the late 1830s, but was not played in gaming houses until the 1890s. Budd Theobald credits the cultural exchange between attendants and railroad passengers on Pullman cars for popularizing the game, which eventually spread throughout America by the 1910s, when it was described as "the gambling game of [the country]" in Foster's Complete Hoyle (1914).

Older bank crap table layout with supplemental wagers, as typical before Winn introduced "Don't Pass"

The craps numbers of 2, 3, and 12 are similarly derived from Hazard. If the main is seven, then the two-dice sum of twelve is added to the crabs as a losing number on the first dice roll. This condition is retained in the simplified game called Pass. All three losing numbers (2, 3, and 12) on the first roll of Pass are jointly called the craps numbers. The central game Pass gradually has been supplemented over the decades by many companion games and wagers which can be played simultaneously with Pass; these are now collectively known as craps.

Early versions of bank craps played in casinos made money either by charging a commission to shooters or offering short odds on the various wagers, primarily on the "Pass line" bet for the shooter to win against the house. In approximately 1907, a dicemaker named John H. Winn in Philadelphia introduced a layout which featured a space to wager on "Don't Pass" (i.e., for the shooter to lose) in addition to "Pass". Virtually all modern casinos use his innovation, which incentivizes casinos to use fair dice. As introduced by Winn, "Don't Pass" bets were taken with a 5 percent commission to ensure the house retained an edge in running the game; this was replaced by the Bar-3 push for "Don't Pass", and later by the Bar-12 (or Bar-2) push.

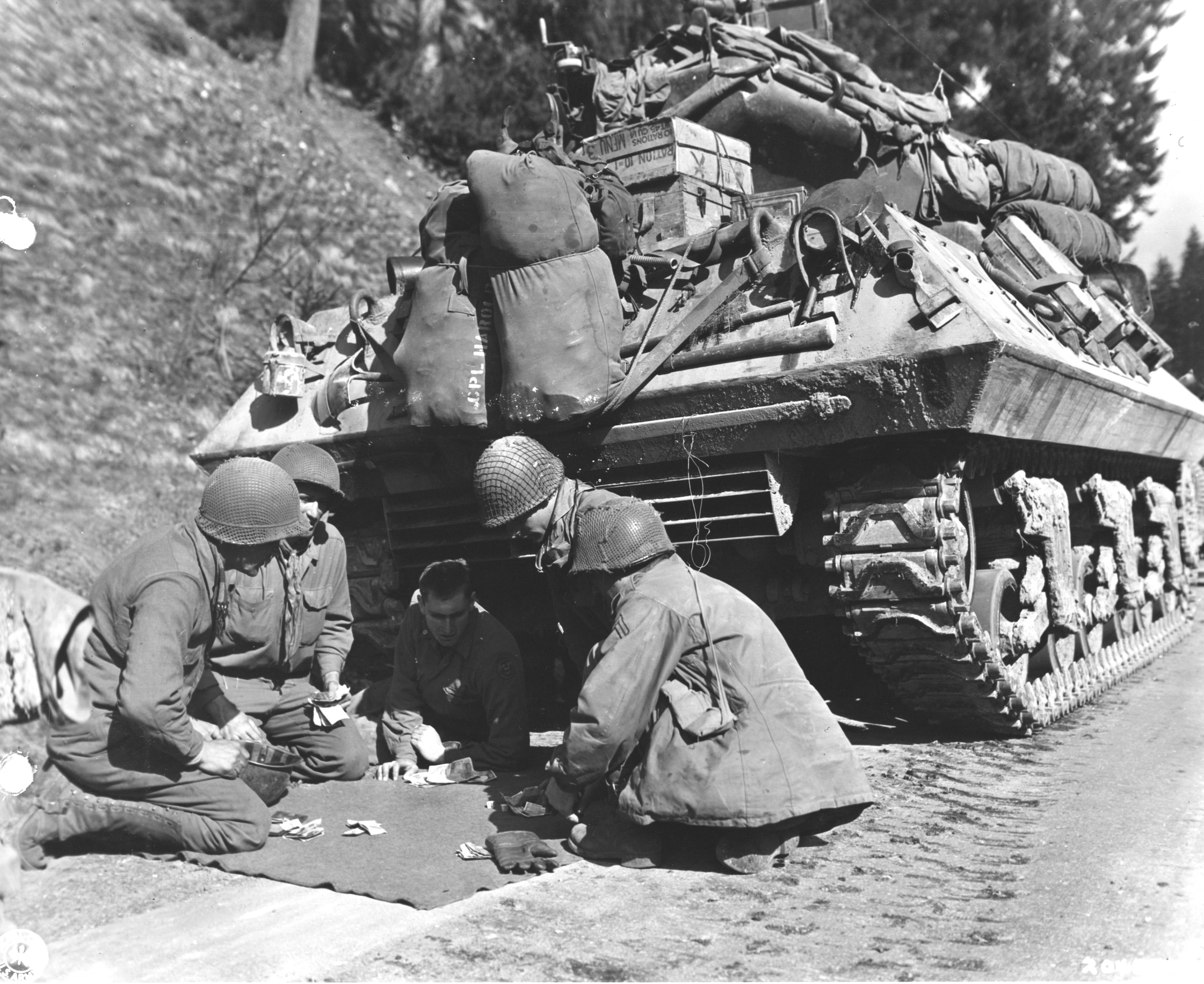
Soldiers playing craps (1945)

Craps exploded in popularity during World War II, which brought most young American men of every social class into the military. The street version of craps was popular among service members who often played it using a blanket as a shooting surface. Their military memories led to craps becoming the dominant casino game in postwar Las Vegas and the Caribbean.

After 1960, a few casinos in Europe, Australia, and Macau began offering craps, and, after 2004, online casinos extended the game's spread globally. Craps has been featured in a number of newer casinos, including the idea of expanding into formerly unavailable locales on the coastline.

== Bank craps ==
Bank craps or casino craps is played by one or more players betting against the casino rather than each other. Both the players and the dealers stand around a large rectangular craps table.

The basic flow of a single game is:

1. The shooter wagers to pass (win) and then makes an initial come-out roll with two six-sided dice.
  1. If the come-out roll is 7 or 11, that is a natural and the shooter has a pass (wins); the game is over.
  2. If the come-out roll is 2, 3, or 12, that is a crap and the shooter has a missout (loses); the game is over.
  3. If the come-out roll is any other number (4, 5, 6, 8, 9, or 10), that value becomes the shooter's point.
2. If a point has been set, the shooter continues to roll until either:
  1. A subsequent roll matches the point. Now the shooter has a pass (wins); or
  2. A subsequent roll is 7. Now the shooter has a missout (loses).
3. Once a point is set and a missout occurs, the dice are passed to the person on the shooter's left, who becomes the new shooter.

=== Craps table ===
The layout of a craps table, sometimes called a double-side dealer

Players use casino chips rather than cash to bet on the Craps "layout", a fabric surface which displays the various bets. The bets vary somewhat among casinos in availability, locations, and payouts.

Against one long side is the casino's table bank: as many as two thousand casino chips in stacks of 20. The opposite long side is usually a long mirror. The U-shaped ends of the table have duplicate layouts and standing room for approximately eight players. In the center of the layout is an additional group of side bets which are used by players from both ends. The vertical walls at each end are usually covered with a rubberized target surface covered with small pyramid shapes to randomize the dice which strike them.

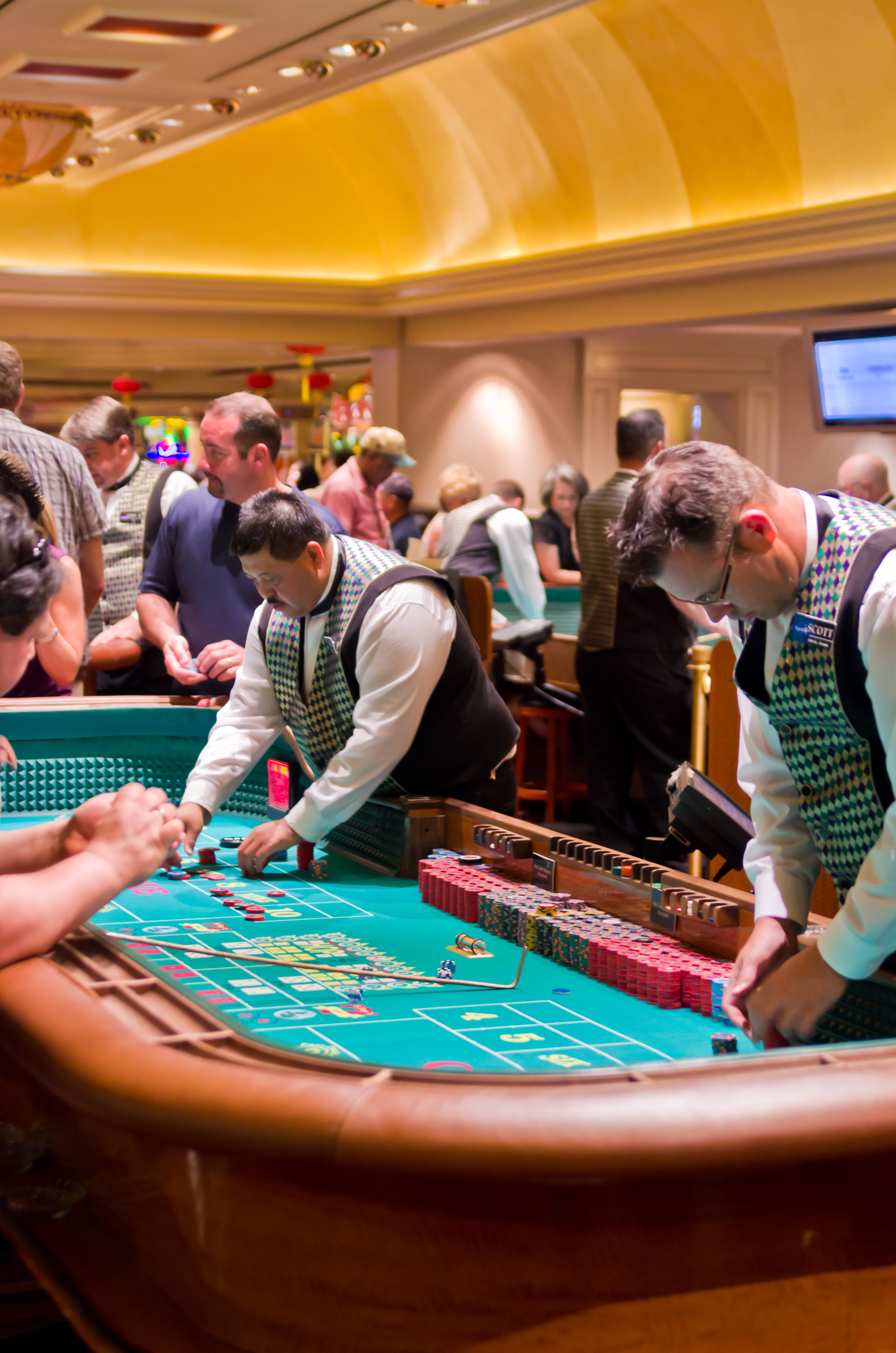
Two base dealers setting chips on a craps table at Harrah's Las Vegas (2011)

The table is run by up to four casino employees: a boxman seated (usually the only seated employee) behind the casino's bank, who manages the chips, supervises the dealers, and handles "coloring up" players (exchanging small chip denominations for larger denominations in order to preserve the chips at a table); two base dealers who stand to either side of the boxman and collect and pay bets to players around their half of the table; and a stickman who stands directly across the table from the boxman, takes and pays (or directs the base dealers to do so) the bets in the center of the table, announces the results of each roll (usually with a distinctive patter), and moves the dice across the layout with an elongated wooden stick.

=== Dice ===
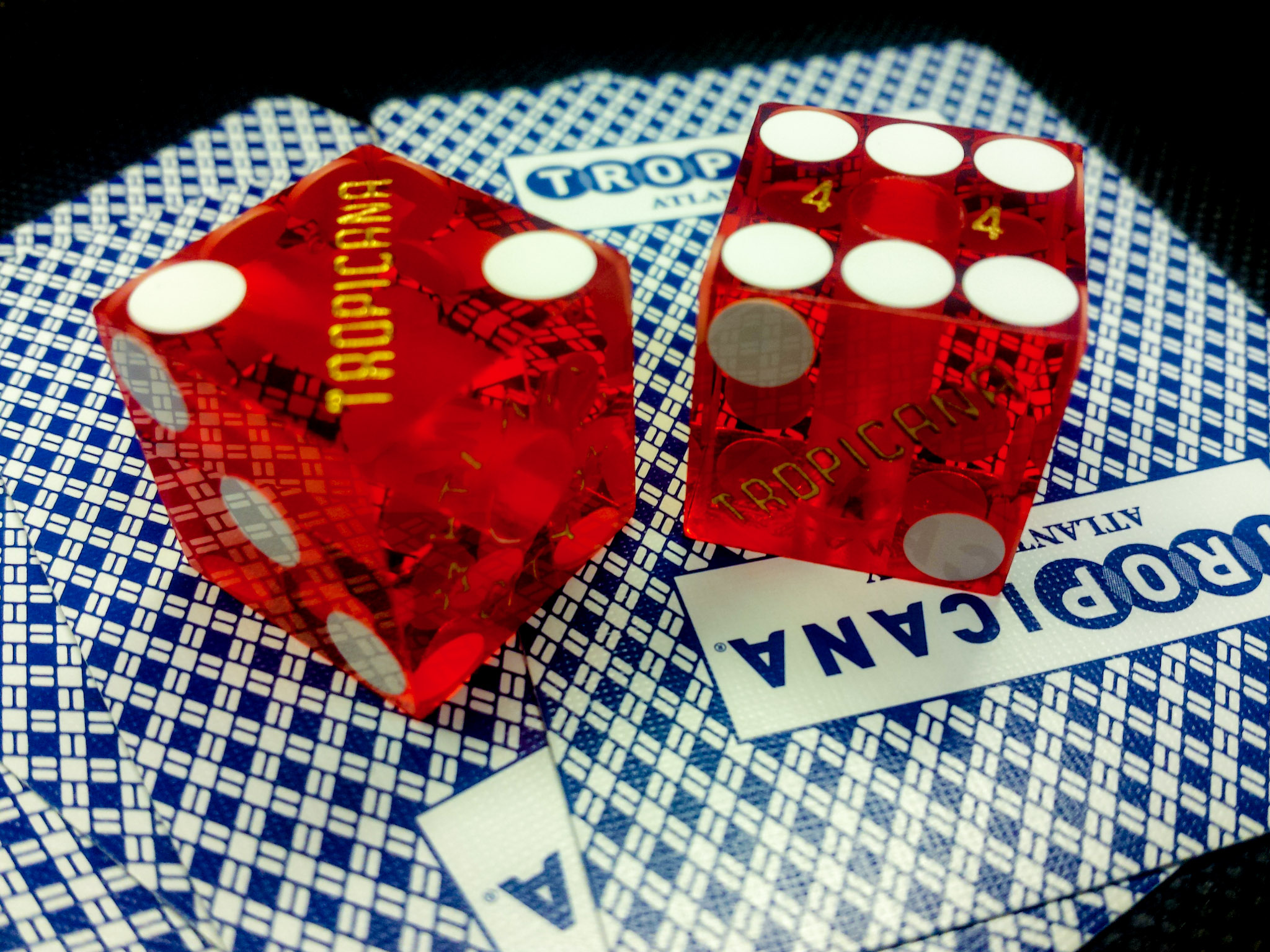
These perfect dice from the Tropicana Atlantic City have been retired by drilling a hole completely through between the one- and six-side faces; the four-digit serial number on the six-side face has been partially obliterated, but it started and ended with a 4.

The dice used at casinos for craps and many other games are sometimes called perfect or gambling house dice. These are generally made from translucent extruded cellulose, with perfectly square edges each 3/4 ± 1/5000 in (19.0500 ± 0.0051 mm) in length, with pips drilled 17 ± 4 mils (0.43 ± 0.10 mm) deep and filled with opaque paint matching the density of cellulose, which ensures the dice remain balanced. The dice are buffed and polished to a high glossy finish after the pips are set, and the edges usually are left sharp, also called square or razor edge. To discourage cheating and dice substitution, each die carries a serial number and the casino's logo or name. New Jersey specifies the maximum size of the die is 0.775 in (19.7 mm) on a side.

Under New Jersey regulations, the shooter selects two dice from a set of at least five.

=== Rules of play ===
Each casino may set which bets are offered and different payouts for them, though a core set of bets and payouts is typical. Players take turns rolling two dice and whoever is throwing the dice is called the "shooter". Players can bet on the various options by placing chips directly on the appropriately-marked sections of the layout, or asking the base dealer or stickman to do so, depending on which bet is being made.

While acting as the shooter, a player must have a bet on either the "Pass" or the "Don't Pass" line or both. "Pass" and "Don't Pass" are sometimes called "Win" and "Lose", "Do" and "Don't", or "Right" and "Wrong". The game is played in rounds and these "Pass" and "Don't Pass" bets are betting on the outcome of a single round. The shooter is presented with multiple dice (typically five) by the "stickman", and must choose two for the round. The remaining dice are returned to the stickman's bowl and are not used.

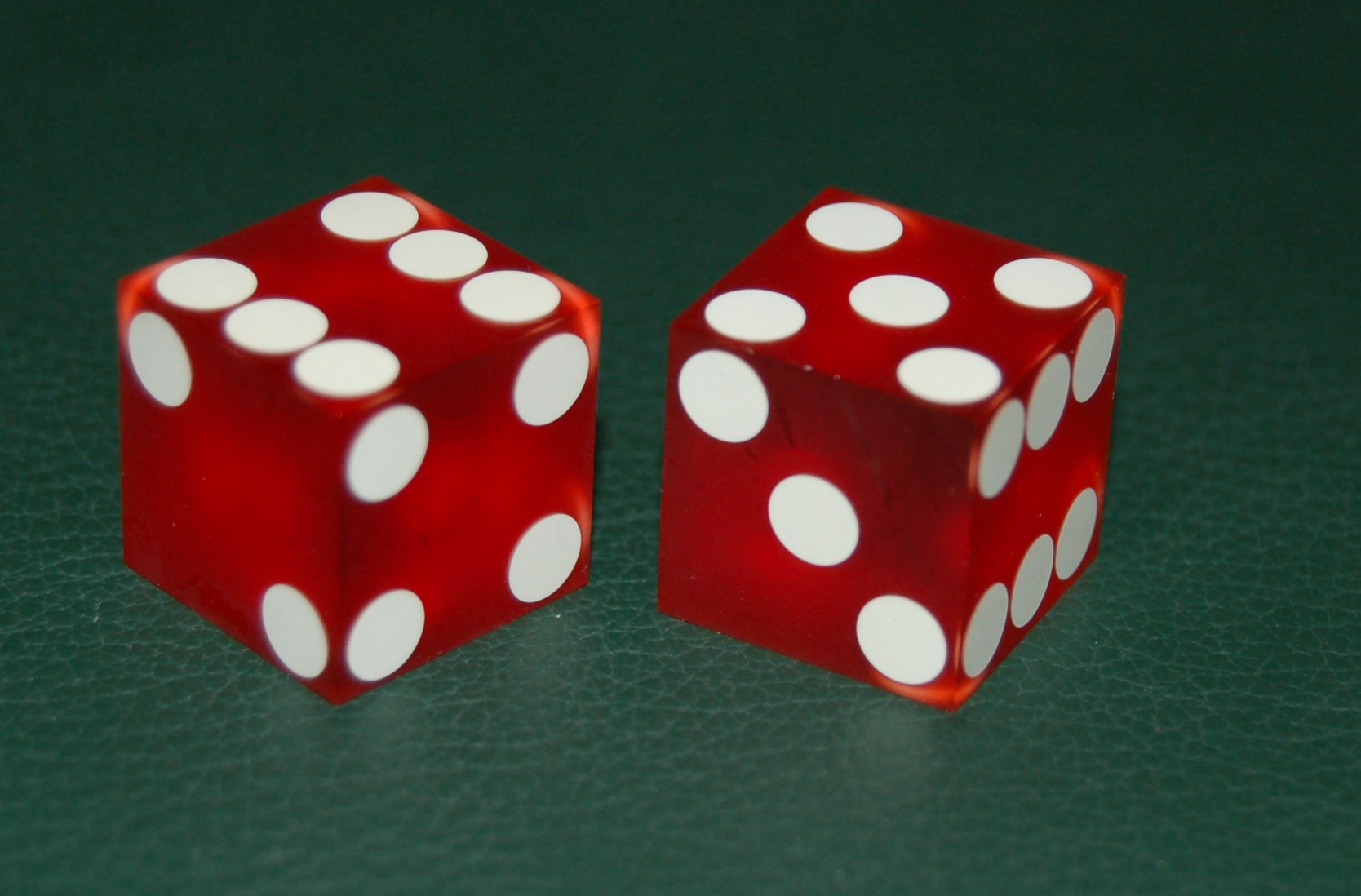
A roll of 11 in the come-out phase is a "natural".

Each round has two phases: "come-out" and "point". Dice are passed to the left.

==== Phase 1 (Come-out) ====
To start a round, the shooter makes one or more "come-out" rolls. While the come-out roll may specifically refer to the first roll of a new shooter, any roll where no point is established may be referred to as a come-out. By this definition the start of any new round regardless of whether it is the shooter's first toss can be referred to as a come-out roll. The shooter must shoot toward the farther back wall and is generally required to hit the farther back wall with both dice. Casinos may allow a few warnings before enforcing the dice to hit the back wall and are generally lenient if at least one die hits the back wall. Both dice must be tossed in one throw. If only one die is thrown the shot is invalid.

A come-out roll of 2, 3, or 12 is called "craps" or "crapping out", and anyone betting the Pass line loses. On the other hand, anyone betting the Don't Pass line on come out wins with a roll of 2 or 3 and ties (pushes) if a 12 is rolled; in some rules, the 2 pushes instead of the 12, in which case the 3 and 12 win a Don't Pass bet. Shooters may keep rolling after crapping out; the dice are only required to be passed if a shooter sevens out (rolls a seven after a point has been established). A come-out roll of 7 or 11 is a "natural"; the Pass line wins and Don't Pass loses. The other possible numbers are the point numbers: 4, 5, 6, 8, 9, and 10. If the shooter rolls one of these numbers on the come-out roll, this establishes the "point" – to "pass" or "win", the point number must be rolled again before a seven.

==== Phase 2 (Point) ====
The dealer flips a button to the "On" side and moves it to the point number signifying the second phase of the round. If the shooter "hits" the point value again (any value of the dice that sum to the point will do; the shooter does not have to exactly repeat the exact combination of the come-out roll) before rolling a seven, the Pass line wins and a new round starts. If the shooter rolls any seven before repeating the point number (a "seven-out"), the Pass line loses, the Don't Pass line wins, and the dice pass clockwise to the next new shooter for the next round. Once a point has been established, any multi-roll bets (including line bets and odds for Pass, Don't Pass, or both) are unaffected by the 2, 3, 11, or 12; the only numbers which affect the round are the established point, any specific bet on a number, or any 7. Any single roll bet is always affected (win or lose) by the outcome of any roll.

Summary of rolls during a single round
Phase 1 ("Come-out")		Phase 2 ("Point")										
Come-out roll	Initial outcome	Subsequent roll(s), after point is established										
Come-out roll	Initial outcome	2	3	4	5	6	7	8	9	10	11	12
2	Craps (Don't Pass)	—N/a										
3	Craps (Don't Pass)	—N/a										
4	Point 4	Reroll	Reroll	Pass	Reroll	Reroll	Don't Pass	Reroll	Reroll	Reroll	Reroll	Reroll
5	Point 5	Reroll	Reroll	Reroll	Pass	Reroll	Don't Pass	Reroll	Reroll	Reroll	Reroll	Reroll
6	Point 6	Reroll	Reroll	Reroll	Reroll	Pass	Don't Pass	Reroll	Reroll	Reroll	Reroll	Reroll
7	Natural (Pass)	—N/a										
8	Point 8	Reroll	Reroll	Reroll	Reroll	Reroll	Don't Pass	Pass	Reroll	Reroll	Reroll	Reroll
9	Point 9	Reroll	Reroll	Reroll	Reroll	Reroll	Don't Pass	Reroll	Pass	Reroll	Reroll	Reroll
10	Point 10	Reroll	Reroll	Reroll	Reroll	Reroll	Don't Pass	Reroll	Reroll	Pass	Reroll	Reroll
11	Natural (Pass)	—N/a										
12	Craps (Don't Pass)	—N/a										

==== Basic wagering rules ====
Any player can make a bet on Pass or Don't Pass as long as a point has not been established, or Come or Don't Come as long as a point is established. All other bets, including an increase in odds behind the Pass and Don't Pass lines, may be made at any time. All bets other than Pass line and Come may be removed or reduced any time before the bet loses. This is known as "taking it down" in craps.

The maximum bet for Place, Buy, Lay, Pass, and Come bets are generally equal to table maximum. Lay bet maximum are equal to the table maximum win, so players wishing to lay the 4 or 10 may bet twice that amount of the table maximum for the win to be table maximum. Odds behind Pass, Come, Don't Pass, and Don't Come may be however larger than the odds offered allows and can be greater than the table maximum in some casinos. Don't odds are capped on the maximum allowed win. Some casino allow the odds bet itself to be larger than the maximum bet allowed as long as the win is capped at maximum odds. Single rolls bets can be lower than the table minimum, but the maximum bet allowed is also lower than the table maximum. The maximum allowed single roll bet is based on the maximum allowed win from a single roll.

In all the above scenarios, whenever the Pass line wins, the Don't Pass line loses, and vice versa, with one exception: on the come-out roll, a roll of 12 will cause Pass Line bets to lose, but Don't Pass bets are pushed (or "barred"), neither winning nor losing; this is done to establish a house edge for Don't Pass bets. (The same applies to "Come" and "Don't Come" bets, discussed below.)

=== Joining a game ===
A player wishing to play craps without being the shooter should approach the craps table and first check to see if the dealer's "On" button is on any of the point numbers.

- If the button has been turned to "Off", then the table is in the come-out phase, and a point has not been established.
- If the dealer's button is "On", the table is in the point phase where casinos will allow odds behind an existing Pass line to be bet. Some casinos do not allow new Pass line bets while a point has been established. Some casinos will place the bet straddling the outer border of the Pass line so as to indicate that it is to be paid the same odds as a place bet, instead of just even money. Other casinos will take the bet on the Pass line after a point has been established, known as put betting, which is a disadvantage to the player (since the seven is the most common roll and likely to happen before the "point").

In either case, all single or multi-roll proposition bets may be placed in either of the two phases.

Between dice rolls there is a period for dealers to make payouts and collect losing bets, after which players can place new bets. The stickman monitors the action at a table and decides when to give the shooter the dice, after which no more betting is allowed.

When joining the game, one should place money on the table rather than passing it directly to a dealer. The dealer's exaggerated movements during the process of "making change" or "change only" (converting currency to an equivalent in casino cheques) are required so that any disputes can be later reviewed against security camera footage.

=== Rolling ===
The dealers will insist that the shooter roll with one hand and that the dice bounce off the far wall surrounding the table. These requirements are meant to keep the game fair (preventing switching the dice or making a "controlled shot"). If a die leaves the table, the shooter will usually be asked to select another die from the remaining three but can request permission to use the same die if it passes the boxman's inspection. This requirement exists to keep the game fair and reduce the chance of loaded dice.

=== Names of rolls ===
Names of Rolls in Craps
Die B Die A	B:1	B:2	B:3	B:4	B:5	B:6
A:1	Snake Eyes					
A:2	Ace Deuce	Hard Four				
A:3	Easy Four	Five (Fever Five)	Hard Six			
A:4	Five (Fever Five)	Easy Six	Natural / Seven Out	Hard Eight		
A:5	Easy Six	Natural / Seven Out	Easy Eight	Nine (Nina)	Hard Ten	
A:6	Natural / Seven Out	Easy Eight	Nine (Nina)	Easy Ten	Yo (Yo-leven)	Boxcars / Midnight

There are many local variants of the calls made by the stickman for rolls during a craps game. These frequently incorporate a reminder to the dealers as to which bets to pay or collect.

Two — "Snake Eyes", "Two Craps Two", "Double Aces", "Loose Deuce", "Snickies"
The two ones that compose it look like a pair of small, beady eyes. During actual play, more common terms are "two craps two" during the comeout roll because the Pass line bet is lost on a comeout crap roll and / or because a bet on any craps would win. "Aces; double the field" would be a more common call when not on the comeout roll to remind the dealers to pay double on the field bets and encourage the field bettor to place subsequent bets and / or when no crap bets have been placed. Another name for the two is "loose deuce" or "Snickies" due to it sounding like "Snake eyes" but spoken with an accent.
Three — "Three Craps Three", "Ace Deuce", "Tracy", "Acey Deucy"
Typically called as "three craps three" during the comeout roll, or "three, ace deuce, come away single" when not on the comeout to signify the come bet has been lost and to pay single to any field bettors. Three may also be referred to as "ace caught a deuce", "Tracy", or even less often "acey deucey".
Four (hard) — "Little Joe", "Joe", "Little Dick", "Little Joe from Kokomo", "Little Joe on the Front Row", "Ballerina"
usually hard, is sometimes referred to as "Little Joe from Kokomo" or "Little Joe on the front row" or just "Little Joe". A hard four can be called a "ballerina" because it is two-two ("tutu").
Five — "Phoebe", "Fever in the South", "West Kentucky", "No Field Five", "Fever"
is frequently called "no field five" in casinos in which five is not one of the field rolls and thus not paid in the field bets. Other names for a five are "fever" and "little Phoebe".
Six — "Jimmie Hicks", "Jimmie Hicks from the Sticks", "666 Winner 6", "Sixty Days", "Sice"
may be referred to as "Jimmie Hicks" or "Jimmie Hicks from the sticks", examples of rhyming slang. On a win, the six is often called "666 winner 6" followed by "came hard" or "came easy".
Seven — "Six Ace", "Up Pops the Devil", "Up Jumped the Devil", "Big Red", "Seven Out", "Seven Out Seven"
rolled as six-one is sometimes called "six ace" or "up pops the Devil". Older dealers and players may use the term "Big Red" because craps tables once prominently featured a large red "7" in the center of the layout for the one-roll seven bet. During the comeout, the seven is called "seven, front line winner", frequently followed by "pay the line" and / or "take the don'ts". After the point is established, a seven is typically called by simply "7 out" or "7 out 7".
Eight (hard) — "Eighter from Decatur", "Ada from Decatur", "Square Pair", "Mom and Dad", "Ozzie and Harriet"
rolled the hard way, as opposed to an "easy eight", is sometimes called an "eighter from Decatur". It can also be known as a "square pair", "mom and dad", or "Ozzie and Harriet".
Nine — "Centerfield Nine", "Railroad Nine", "Jesse James", "Nina from Pasadena", "Nina at the Marina", "Niner from Carolina", Old Mike"
is called a "centerfield nine" in casinos in which nine is one of the field rolls, because nine is the center number shown on the layout in such casinos (2–3–4–9–10–11–12). In Atlantic City, a four-five is called a "railroad nine". The four-five nine is also known as "Jesse James" because the outlaw Jesse James was killed by a .45 caliber pistol. Other names for the nine include "Nina from Pasadena", "Nina at the Marina", and "niner from Carolina". Nine can also be referred to as "Old Mike", named after NBA Hall-of-Famer Michael Jordan, who wore No. 9 in his FIBA international career, when players could only wear numbers 4 to 15.
Ten (hard) — "Big Dick", "Big Dick from Boston", "Big Dick the Ladies' Friend", "Dos Equis", "Puppy Paws", "Pair of Sunflowers", "Big John"
the hard way is "a hard ten", "dos equis" (Spanish, meaning "two X's", because the pip arrangement on both dice on this roll resembles "XX"), or "Hard ten – a woman's best friend", an example of both rhyming slang and sexual double entendre. Ten as a pair of fives may also be known as "puppy paws" or "a pair of sunflowers" or "Big Dick" or "Big John." Another slang for a hard ten is "moose head", because it resembles a moose's antlers. This phrase came from players in the Pittsburgh area.
Eleven — "Yo", "Yo-leven", "Six Five No Jive"
called out as "yo" or "yo-leven" to prevent being misheard as "seven". An older term for eleven is "six five, no jive" because it is a winning roll. During the comeout, eleven is typically followed by "front line winner". After the point is established, "good field and come" is often added.
Twelve — "Boxcars", "Midnight", "Double-action Field Traction", "12 Craps 12"
known as "boxcars" because the spots on the two dice that show six-six look like schematic drawings of railroad boxcars; it is also called "midnight", referring to twelve o'clock; and also as "double-action field traction", because of the (standard) 2-to-1 pay on Field bets for this roll and the fact that the arrangement of the pips on the two dice, when laid end-to-end, resemble tire tracks. On tables that pay triple the field on a twelve roll, the stickman will often loudly exclaim "triple" either alone or in combination with "12 craps 12" or "come away triple".

Rolls of 4, 6, 8, and 10 are called "hard" or "gag", when rolled as a double, or "easy", when rolled with two different numbers. For example, rolls will be called "six the hard way", "easy eight", "hard ten", etc., because of their significance in center table bets known as the "hard ways". Hard way rolls are so named because there is only one way to roll them (i.e., the value on each die is the same when the number is rolled). Consequently, it is more likely to roll the number in different-number combinations (easy) rather than as a double (hard).

== Bet odds and summary ==
Note: Individual casinos may pay some of these bets at different payout ratios than those listed below. Some bets are listed more than once below – the most common payout in North American casinos is listed first, followed by other known variants.

Note: "True Odds" do not vary.

Summary of wagers, true odds, and typical payouts
Bet	Type	True Odds	Odds Paid	House Edge	Single or Multi Roll	Win	Lose	Notes
Pass / Come	Line	251:244	1:1	1.41%	Multi	Come out roll: 7, 11. Once the point is established: the point number (one of: 4, 5, 6, 8, 9, 10)	Come out roll: 2, 3, 12. Once the point is established: 7	Considered a "contract bet": once the point is established, the bet is locked until it wins or loses. See Optimal betting. Come uses only the come-out roll criteria (7, 11 to win "come") for a single roll after the point is established.
Don't Pass / Don't Come (Bar-12 or Bar-2)	Line	976:949	1:1	1.36%	Multi	Come out roll: 2 (or 12, depending on Bar), 3 Tie: 12 (or 2, depending on Bar) Once the point is established: 7	Come out roll: 7, 11. Once the point is established: the point number (one of: 4, 5, 6, 8, 9, 10)	Controlled by the player: can be decreased at any time, but see Optimal betting. In some casinos, Bar-3 (1–2) is applied in lieu of either Bar-12 or Bar-2; this increases the house edge to 4.39%. Don't come uses only the come-out roll criteria (2, 3, 12 to win or tie "don't come", depending on Bar) for a single roll after the point is established.
Pass Odds / Come Odds	Line	Same as paid	2:1 on 4,10; 3:2 on 5,9; 6:5 on 6,8	0%	Multi	Once the point is established: the point number (one of: 4, 5, 6, 8, 9, 10)	Once the point is established: 7	Controlled by the player: can be increased or decreased at any time
Don't Pass Odds / Don't Come Odds	Line	Same as paid	1:2 against 4,10; 2:3 against 5,9; 5:6 against 6,8	0%	Multi	Once the point is established: 7	Once the point is established: the point number (one of: 4, 5, 6, 8, 9, 10)	Controlled by the player: can be increased or decreased at any time
Yo (11)	Prop	17:1	15:1	11.11%	Single	11	Any other number	
3	Prop	17:1	15:1	11.11%	Single	3	Any other number	
2	Prop	35:1	30:1	13.89%	Single	2	Any other number	
12	Prop	35:1	30:1	13.89%	Single	12	Any other number	
Hi-Lo (2 or 12)	Prop	17:1	15:1	11.11%	Single	2 or 12	Any other number	
Craps (2, 3, or 12)	Prop	8:1	7:1	11.11%	Single	2, 3, 12	Any other number	
C & E (the combined bet)	Prop	5:1	3:1 on 2,3,12; 7:1 on 11	11.11%	Single	2, 3, 11, 12	Any other number	
Any 7	Prop	5:1	4:1	16.67%	Single	7	Any other number	
Field	Prop	5:4	1:1 on 3,4,9,10,11; 2:1 on 2,12	5.56% (2.78% if 12 pays 3:1, 0% if 2 and 12 pay 3:1)	Single	2,3,4,9,10,11,12	Any other number	Most common payout schedule. Some casinos pay 2:1 for 2 and 3:1 for 12, reducing house edge to 2.78%. A few pay both 2 and 12 at 3:1, eliminating the house edge.
Horn (the combined bet)	Prop	5:1	27:4 on 2,12; 3:1 on 3,11	12.5%	Single	2,3,11,12	Any other number	
Whirl / World (the combined bet)	Prop	2:1	26:5 on 2,12; 11:5 on 3,11; 0:1 (push) on 7	13.33%	Single	2,3,7,11,12	Any other number	
Hard 4 / Hard 10	Hard way	8:1	7:1	11.11%	Multi	4 as a pair (2-2) 10 as a pair (5-5)	7 4 as a non-pair (1–3) 10 as a non-pair (4–6)	In the UK and Australia, the payout is 7.5:1 lowering the house edge to 5.56%.
Hard 6 / Hard 8	Hard way	10:1	9:1	9.09%	Multi	6 as a pair (3-3) 8 as a pair (4-4)	7 6 as a non-pair (1–5, 2–4) 8 as a non-pair (2–6, 3–5)	In the UK and Australia, the payout is 9.5:1 lowering the house edge to 4.55%.
Big 6 / Big 8	Big 6 / 8	6:5	1:1	9.09%	Multi	6 / 8	7	Same true odds, better payout if the player places the 6 / 8
Place 4 / Place 10	Place	2:1	9:5	6.67%	Multi	4 / 10	7	Same true odds, better payout if the player buys the 4 / 10
Place 5 / Place 9	Place	3:2	7:5	4%	Multi	5 / 9	7	
Place 6 / Place 8	Place	6:5	7:6	1.52%	Multi	6 / 8	7	
Buy 4 / Buy 10	Buy	2:1	2:1 -5% of intended bet	4.76% (1.67% if commission taken only on win)	Multi	4 / 10	7	Certain casinos such as Santa Ana Star Casino offer "Free buy" reducing house edge to 0%
Buy 5 / Buy 9	Buy	3:2	3:2 -5% of intended bet	4.76% (2.00% if commission taken only on win)	Multi	5 / 9	7	Same true odds, better payout if the player places the 5 / 9
Buy 6 / Buy 8	Buy	6:5	6:5 -5% of intended bet	4.76% (2.27% if commission taken only on win)	Multi	6 / 8	7	Same true odds, better payout if the player places the 6 / 8
Lay 4 / Lay 10	Lay	1:2	1:2 -5% of intended win	2.44% (1.67% if commission taken only on win)	Multi	7	4 / 10	
Lay 5 / Lay 9	Lay	2:3	2:3 -5% of intended win	3.23% (2% if commission taken only on win)	Multi	7	5 / 9	
Lay 6 / Lay 8	Lay	5:6	5:6 -5% intended win	4.00% (2.27% if commission taken only on win)	Multi	7	6 / 8	

The probability of dice combinations determine the odds of the payout. There are a total of 36 (6 × 6) possible combinations when rolling two dice. The following chart shows the dice combinations needed to roll each number. The two and twelve are the hardest to roll since only one combination of dice is possible. The game of craps is built around the dice roll of seven, since it is the most easily rolled dice combination.

Combinations of two dice, illustrated

Combinations of two dice, with probability of occurrence
Dice roll (sum)	Possible dice combinations	Probability	
2	1	1/36	(2.78%)
3	,	2/36=1/18	(5.56%)
4	,,	3/36=1/12	(8.33%)
5	,,,	4/36=1/9	(11.11%)
6	,,,,	5/36	(13.89%)
7	,,,,,	6/36=1/6	(16.67%)
8	,,,,	5/36	(13.89%)
9	,,,	4/36=1/9	(11.11%)
10	,,	3/36=1/12	(8.33%)
11	,	2/36=1/18	(5.56%)
12	6	1/36	(2.78%)

Viewed another way:

Sum of two six-sided dice
Die A Die B	1	2	3	4	5	6
1	2	3	4	5	6	7
2	3	4	5	6	7	8
3	4	5	6	7	8	9
4	5	6	7	8	9	10
5	6	7	8	9	10	11
6	7	8	9	10	11	12

The expected value of all bets is usually negative, such that the average player will always lose money. This is because the house always sets the paid odds to below the actual odds. The only exception is the "odds" bet that the player is allowed to make after a point is established on a pass / come Don't Pass / Don't Come bet (the odds portion of the bet has a long-term expected value of 0). However, this "free odds" bet cannot be made independently, so the expected value of the entire bet, including odds, is still negative. Since there is no correlation between die rolls, there is normally no possible long-term winning strategy in craps.

There are occasional promotional variants that provide either no house edge or even a player edge. One example is a field bet that pays 3:1 on 12 and 2:1 on either 3 or 11. Overall, given the 5:4 true odds of this bet, and the weighted average paid odds of approximately 7:5, the player has a 5% advantage on this bet. This is sometimes seen at casinos running limited-time incentives, in jurisdictions or gaming houses that require the game to be fair, or in layouts for use in informal settings using play money. No casino currently runs a craps table with a bet that yields a player edge full-time.

Maximizing the size of the odds bet in relation to the line bet will reduce, but never eliminate the house edge, and will increase variance. Most casinos have a limit on how large the odds bet can be in relation to the line bet, with single, double, and five times odds common. Some casinos offer 3–4–5 odds, referring to the maximum multiple of the line bet a player can place in odds for the points of 4 and 10, 5 and 9, and 6 and 8, respectively. During promotional periods, a casino may even offer 100× odds bets, which reduces the house edge to almost nothing, but dramatically increases variance, as the player will be betting in large betting units.

Since several of the multiple roll bets pay off in ratios of fractions on the dollar, it is important that the player bets in multiples that will allow a correct payoff in complete dollars. Normally, payoffs will be rounded down to the nearest dollar, resulting in a higher house advantage. These bets include all place bets, taking odds, and buying on numbers 6, 8, 5, and 9, as well as laying all numbers.

== Types of wagers ==
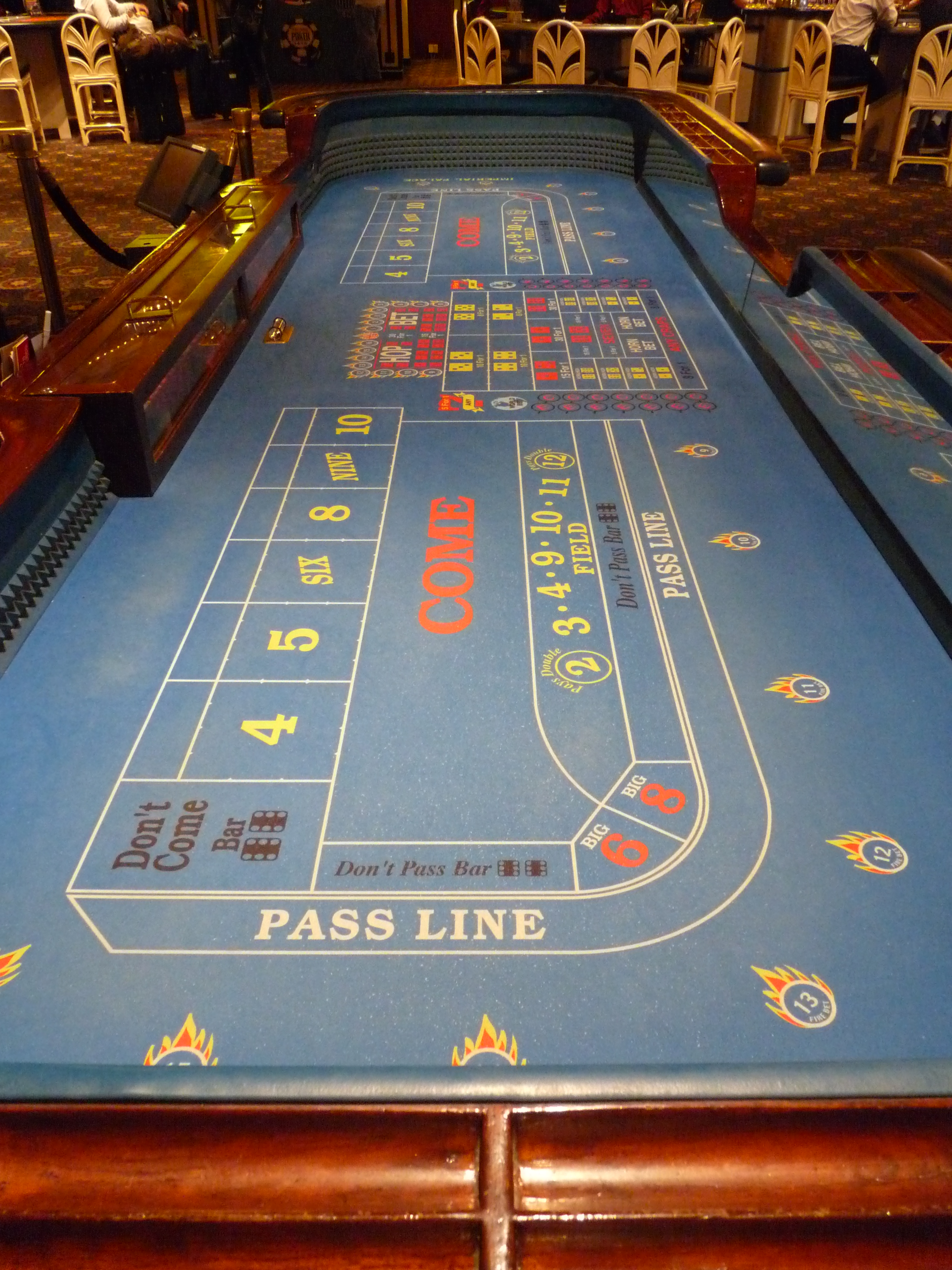
A standard craps table

=== Line bets ===
The shooter is required to make either a Pass line bet or a Don't Pass bet if he wants to shoot. On the come out roll each player may only make one bet on the Pass or Don't Pass, but may bet both if desired. The Pass Line and Don't Pass bet is optional for any player not shooting. In rare cases, some casinos require all players to make a minimum Pass Line or Don't Pass bet (if they want to make any other bet), whether they are currently shooting or not.

Left section of bank craps table, with spaces for common line and place bets. From top to bottom, these bets are: Don't Come (Bar-12) and Place 4 / 5 / 6 / 8 / 9 / 10; Don't Pass (Bar-12) and Come; Big 6, Big 8, and Field; Don't Pass (Bar-12); Pass (wraps around to outside of diagram)

==== Pass line ====
The basic bet in craps is the Pass line bet, which is a bet for the shooter to win. This bet must be at least the table minimum and at most the table maximum.

- If the come-out roll is 7 or 11, the bet wins.
- If the come-out roll is 2, 3 or 12, the bet loses (known as "crapping out").
- If the roll is any other value, it establishes a point.
  - If, with a point established, that point is rolled again before a 7, the bet wins.
  - If, with a point established, a 7 is rolled before the point is rolled again ("seven out"), the bet loses.

The Pass line bet pays even money.

The Pass line bet is a contract bet. Once a Pass line bet is made, it is always working and cannot be turned "Off", taken down, or reduced until a decision is reached – the point is made, or the shooter sevens out. A player may increase any corresponding odds (up to the table limit) behind the Pass line at any time after a point is established. Players may only bet the Pass line on the come out roll when no point has been established, unless the casino allows put betting where the player can bet Pass line or increase an existing Pass line bet whenever desired and may take odds immediately if the point is already on.

==== Don't Pass ====
A Don't Pass bet is a bet for the shooter to lose ("seven out, line away") and is almost the opposite of the Pass line bet. Like the Pass bet, this bet must be at least the table minimum and at most the table maximum.

- If the come-out roll is 3, the bet wins.
- If the come-out roll is 7 or 11, the bet loses.
- If the game is being played under "Bar-12" or "Bar Sixes":
  - If the come-out roll is 2, the bet wins.
  - If the come-out roll is 12, the bet is a push (neither won nor lost).
- Alternatively, if the game instead is played under "Bar-2" or "Bar Aces":
  - If the come-out roll is 2, the bet is a push.
  - If the come-out roll is 12, the bet wins.
- If the roll is any other value, it establishes a point.
  - If, with a point established, a 7 is rolled before the point is rolled again ("seven out"), the bet wins.
  - If, with a point established, that point is rolled again before a 7, the bet loses.

The Don't Pass bet pays even money.

The Don't Pass bet is a no-contract bet. After a point is established, a player may take down or reduce a Don't Pass bet and any corresponding odds at any time because odds of rolling a 7 before the point is in the player's favor. Once taken down or reduced, however, the Don't Pass bet may not be restored or increased. Because the shooter must have a line bet the shooter generally may not reduce a Don't Pass bet below the table minimum. In Las Vegas, a majority of casinos will allow the shooter to move the bet to the Pass line in lieu of taking it down; however, in other areas such as Pennsylvania and Atlantic City, this is not allowed. Even though players are allowed to remove the Don't Pass line bet after a point has been established, the bet cannot be turned "Off" without being removed. Players choosing to remove the Don't Pass line bet can no longer lay odds behind the Don't Pass line. The player can, however, still make standard lay bets on any of the point numbers (4, 5, 6, 8, 9, 10).

The casino chooses either Bar-2 or Bar-12, but not both. The push on 12 or 2 is mathematically necessary to maintain the house edge over the player. Other casinos allow the player to choose to either push on 2 ("Bar Aces") or push on 12 ("Bar Sixes") depending on where it is placed on the layout. Some older bank crap games used Bar-3 ("Bar Ace-Deuce"), which increases the house edge.

There are two different ways to calculate the odds and house edge of this bet. The summary table gives the numbers considering that the game ends in a push when a 12 is rolled, rather than being undetermined. Betting on Don't Pass is often called "playing the dark side", and it is considered by some players to be in poor taste, or even taboo, because it goes directly against conventional play, winning when most of the players lose.

==== Pass odds ====
If a 4, 5, 6, 8, 9, or 10 is thrown on the come-out roll (i.e., when a point is established), most casinos allow Pass line players to take odds by placing up to some predetermined multiple of the Pass line bet, behind the Pass line. This additional bet wins if the point is rolled again before a 7 is rolled (the point is made) and pays at the true odds:

- 2-to-1 if 4 or 10 is the point,
- 3-to-2 if 5 or 9 is the point, or
- 6-to-5 if 6 or 8 is the point.

Unlike the Pass line bet itself, the Pass line odds bet can be turned "Off" (not working), removed or reduced anytime before it loses. In Las Vegas, generally odds bets are required to be the table minimum. In Atlantic City and Pennsylvania, the combine odds and Pass bet must be table minimum so players can bet the minimum single unit on odds depending on the point. If the point is a 4 or 10, players can bet as little as $1 on odds if the table minimum is low such as is $5, $10 or $15. If the player requests the Pass odds be not working ("Off") and the shooter sevens-out or hits the point, the Pass line bet will be lost or doubled and the Pass odds returned.

Individual casinos (and sometimes tables within a casino) vary greatly in the maximum odds they offer, from single or double odds (one or two times the Pass line bet) up to 100× or even unlimited odds. A variation often seen is "3-4-5× Odds", where the maximum allowed odds bet depends on the point: three times if the point is 4 or 10; four times on points of 5 or 9; or five times on points of 6 or 8. This rule simplifies the calculation of winnings: a maximum Pass odds bet on a 3–4–5× table will always be paid at six times the Pass line bet regardless of the point.

As odds bets are paid at true odds, in contrast with the Pass line which is always even money, taking odds on a minimum Pass line bet lessens the house advantage compared with betting the same total amount on the Pass line only. A maximum odds bet on a minimum Pass line bet often gives the lowest house edge available in any game in the casino. However, the odds bet cannot be made independently, so the house retains an edge on the Pass line bet itself.

==== Don't Pass odds ====
If a player is playing Don't Pass instead of pass, they also may lay odds by placing chips behind the Don't Pass line. If a 7 comes before the point is rolled, the Don't Pass odds pay at true odds:

- 1-to-2 if 4 or 10 is the point,
- 2-to-3 if 5 or 9 is the point, or
- 5-to-6 if 6 or 8 is the point.

Typically the maximum lay bet will be expressed such that a player may win up to an amount equal to the maximum odds multiple at the table. If a player lays maximum odds with a point of 4 or 10 on a table offering five-times odds, he would be able to lay a maximum of ten times the amount of his Don't Pass bet. At 5× odds table, the maximum amount the combined bet can win will always be 6× the amount of the Don't Pass bet. Players can bet table minimum odds if desired and win less than table minimum.

Like the Don't Pass bet the odds can be removed or reduced. Unlike the Don't Pass bet itself, the Don't Pass odds can be turned "Off" (not working). In Las Vegas generally odds bets are required to be the table minimum. In Atlantic City and Pennsylvania, the combine lay odds and Don't Pass bet must be table minimum so players may bet as little as the minimum two units on odds depending on the point. If the point is a 4 or 10 players can bet as little as $2 if the table minimum is low such as $5, $10 or $15 tables. If the player requests the Don't Pass odds to be not working ("Off") and the shooter hits the point or sevens-out, the Don't Pass bet will be lost or doubled and the Don't Pass odds returned. Unlike a standard lay bet on a point, lay odds behind the Don't Pass line does not charge commission (vig).

==== Come bet ====
A player making a Come bet is wagering on the first number that "comes" from the shooter's next roll, regardless of the table's phase. In other words, a Come bet can be considered as starting an entirely new Pass line bet, unique to that player.

- If a 7 or 11 is rolled on the shooter's next roll, the Come bet wins.
- If a 2, 3, or 12 is rolled on the shooter's next roll, the Come bet loses.
- If a 4, 5, 6, 8, 9, or 10 is rolled on the shooter's next roll, the number becomes the "come-bet point".
  - The Come bet will be moved by the base dealer onto a box representing the same "come-bet point" number the shooter threw.
  - If, with the Come-bet point established, that number is rolled during this second phase, the Come bet wins.
  - If, with the Come-bet point established, a 7 is rolled during this second phase, the Come bet loses.
  - The player is allowed to take odds on the Come-bet point, just like a Pass line bet.

The Come bet pays off at even money, like the Pass line bet.

Come bets can only be made after a point has been established since, on the come-out roll, a Come bet would be the same as a Pass line bet. Like the Pass line bet, each player may only make one Come bet per roll; this does not exclude a player from betting odds on an already established come-bet point. The Come bet must be at least the table minimum and at most the table maximum. Players may bet both the Come and Don't Come on the same roll if desired.

Also like a Pass line bet, the come bet is a contract bet and is always working, and cannot be turned "Off", removed or reduced until it wins or loses. However, the odds taken behind a Come bet can be turned "Off" (not working), removed or reduced anytime before the bet loses. In Las Vegas generally odds bets are required to be the table minimum. In Atlantic City and Pennsylvania, the combine odds and Pass bet must be table minimum so players can bet the minimum single unit depending on the point. If the point is a 4 or 10, players can bet as little as $1 if the table minimum is low such as $5, $10, or $15 minimums. If the player requests the Come odds to be not working ("Off") and the shooter sevens-out or hits the Come bet point, the Come bet will be lost or doubled and the Come odds returned. If the casino allows put betting a player may increase a Come bet after a point has been established and bet larger odds behind if desired. Put betting also allows a player to bet on a Come and take odds immediately on a point number without a Come bet point being established.

The dealer will place the odds on top of the come bet, but slightly off center in order to differentiate between the original bet and the odds. The second round wins if the shooter rolls the come bet point again before a seven. Winning come bets are paid the same as winning Pass line bets: even money for the original bet and true odds for the odds bet. If, instead, the seven is rolled before the come-bet point, the come bet (and any odds bet) loses.

Because of the come bet, if the shooter makes their point, a player can find themselves in the situation where they still have a come bet (possibly with odds on it) and the next roll is a come-out roll. In this situation, odds bets on the come wagers are usually presumed to be not working for the come-out roll. That means that if the shooter rolls a 7 on the come-out roll, any players with active come bets waiting for a come-bet point lose their initial wager but will have their odds bets returned to them.

If the come-bet point is rolled on the come-out roll, the odds do not win but the come bet does and the odds bet is returned (along with the come bet and its payoff). The player can tell the dealer that they want their odds working, such that if the shooter rolls a number that matches the come point, the odds bet will win along with the come bet, and if a seven is rolled, both lose.

Many players will use a come bet as "insurance" against sevening out: if the shooter rolls a seven, the come bet pays 1:1, offsetting the loss of the Pass line bet. The risk in this strategy is the situation where the shooter does not hit a seven for several rolls, leading to multiple come bets that will be lost if the shooter eventually sevens out.

==== Don't Come bet ====
In the same way that a Come bet is similar to a Pass line bet, a Don't Come bet is similar to a Don't Pass bet. Like the Come, the Don't Come can only be bet after a point has already been established as it is the same as a Don't Pass line bet when no point is established. This bet must be at least the table minimum and at most the table maximum. A Don't Come bet is played in two phases, just like the Don't Pass line bet.

- If a 2 or 3 is rolled in the first phase, it wins.
- If a 7 or 11 is rolled, it loses.
- If a 12 is rolled, it is a push, assuming that Bar-12 is being followed; if Bar-2 is being followed, 2 instead is a push and 12 wins, in the same way as described above for the variants of the Don't Pass bet.
- If, instead, the roll is 4, 5, 6, 8, 9, or 10, this sets the Don't Come point.
  - The base dealer will move the Don't Come bet onto a box representing the Don't Come point, i.e., the number the shooter threw.
  - The second phase wins if the shooter rolls a seven before the Don't Come point.

Like the Don't Pass each player may only make one Don't Come bet per roll, this does not exclude a player from laying odds on an already established Don't Come points. Players may bet both the Don't Come and Come on the same roll if desired.

The player may lay odds on a Don't Come bet, just like a Don't Pass bet; in this case, the dealer (not the player) places the odds bet on top of the bet in the box, because of limited space, slightly offset to signify that it is an odds bet and not part of the original Don't Come bet. Lay odds behind a Don't Come are subject to the same rules as Don't Pass lay odds. Unlike a standard lay bet on a point, lay odds behind a Don't Come point does not charge commission (vig) and gives the player true odds. Like the Don't Pass line bet, Don't Come bets are no-contract, and can be removed or reduced after a Don't Come point has been established, but cannot be turned off ("not working") without being removed. A player may also call, "No Action" when a point is established, and the bet will not be moved to its point. This play is not to the player's advantage. If the bet is removed, the player can no longer lay odds behind the Don't Come point and cannot restore or increase the same Don't Come bet. Players must wait until next roll as long as a Pass line point has been established (players cannot bet Don't Come on come out rolls) before they can make a new Don't Come bet. Las Vegas casinos which allow put betting allows players to move the Don't Come directly to any Come point as a put; however, this is not allowed in Atlantic City or Pennsylvania. Unlike the Don't Come bet itself, the Don't Come odds can be turned "Off" (not working), removed, or reduced if desired. In Las Vegas, players generally must lay at least table minimum on odds if desired and win less than table minimum; in Atlantic City and Pennsylvania a player's combined bet must be at least table minimum, so depending on the point number players may lay as little as 2 minimum units (e.g. if the point is 4 or 10). If the player requests the Don't Come odds be not working ("Off") and the shooter hits the Don't Come point or sevens-out, the Don't Come bet will be lost or doubled and the Don't Come odds returned.

Winning Don't Come bets are paid the same as winning Don't Pass bets: even money for the original bet and true odds for the odds lay. Unlike come bets, the odds laid behind points established by Don't Come bets are always working including come out rolls unless the player specifies otherwise.

=== Multi-roll bets ===
These are bets that may not be settled on the first roll and may need one or more subsequent rolls before an outcome is determined.

Most multi-roll bets may fall into the situation where a point is made by the shooter before the outcome of the multi-roll bet is decided. These bets are often considered "not working" on the new come-out roll until the next point is established, unless the player calls the bet as "working."

Casino rules vary on this; some of these bets may not be callable, while others may be considered "working" during the come-out. Dealers will usually announce if bets are working unless otherwise called off. If a non-working point number placed, bought or laid becomes the new point as the result of a come-out, the bet is usually refunded, or can be moved to another number for free.

==== Place ====
Players can bet any point number (4, 5, 6, 8, 9, 10) by placing their wager in the come area and telling the dealer how much and on what number(s), "30 on the 6", "5 on the 5", or "25 on the 10". These are typically "Place Bets to Win". These are bets that the number bet on will be rolled before a 7 is rolled, similar to the Pass odds bets. These bets are considered working bets, and will continue to be paid out each time a shooter rolls the number bet. On a come-out roll, a place bet is considered to be not in effect unless the player who made it specifies otherwise. This bet may be removed or reduced at any time until it loses; in the latter case, the player must abide by any table minimums.

Place bets to win pay out at slightly worse than the true odds: 9-to-5 on points 4 or 10, 7-to-5 on points 5 or 9, and 7-to-6 on points 6 or 8. The place bets on the outside numbers (4,5,9,10) should be made in units of $5, (on a $5 minimum table), in order to receive the correct exact payout of $5 paying $7 or $5 paying $9. The place bets on the 6 & 8 should be made in units of $6, (on a $5 minimum table), in order to receive the correct exact payout of $6 paying $7. For the 4 and 10, it is to the player's advantage to 'buy' the bet (see below).

An alternative form, rarely offered by casinos, is the "place bet to lose." This bet is the opposite of the place bet to win and pays off if a 7 is rolled before the specific point number. The place bet to lose typically carries a lower house edge than a place bet to win. Payouts are 4-to-5 on points 6 or 8, 5-to-8 on 5 or 9, and 5-to-11 on 4 or 10.

==== Buy ====
Players can also "buy" a point and place a bet which will pay out at true odds if that number is rolled before the next 7, but a 5% commission is charged on the amount of the bet. The buy bet must be at least table minimum excluding commission; however, some casinos require the minimum buy bet amount to be at least $20 to match the $1 charged on the 5% commission. Traditionally, the buy bet commission is paid no matter what, but in recent years a number of casinos have changed their policy to charge the commission only when the buy bet wins. Some casinos charge the commission as a one-time fee to buy the number; payouts are then always at true odds. Most casinos usually charge only $1 for a $25 green-chip bet (4% commission), or $2 for $50 (two green chips), reducing the house advantage a bit more. Players may reduce this bet (keeping it above the table minimum excluding the commission) or remove it at any time before it loses. Like place bets, buy bets are not working when no point has been established unless the player specifies otherwise.

Where commission is charged only on wins, the commission is often deducted from the winning payoff—a winning $25 buy bet on the 10 would pay $49, for instance. The house edges stated in the table assume the commission is charged on all bets. They are reduced by at least a factor of two if commission is charged on winning bets only.

==== Lay ====
A lay bet is the opposite of a buy bet, where a player bets on a 7 to roll before the number that is laid. Players may only lay the 4, 5, 6, 8, 9, or 10 and may lay multiple numbers if desired. Just like the buy bet lay bets pay true odds, but because the lay bet is the opposite of the buy bet, the payout is reversed. Therefore, players get 1 to 2 for the numbers 4 and 10, 2 to 3 for the numbers 5 and 9, and 5 to 6 for the numbers 6 and 8. A 5% commission (vigorish, vig, juice) is charged up front on the possible winning amount. For example: A $40 Lay Bet on the 4 would pay $20 on a win. The 5% vig would be $1 based on the $20 win. (not $2 based on the $40 bet as the way buy bet commissions are figured.) Like the buy bet the commission is adjusted to suit the betting unit such that fraction of a dollar payouts are not needed. Casinos may charge the vig up front thereby requiring the player to pay a vig win or lose, other casinos may only take the vig if the bet wins. Taking vig only on wins lowers house edge. Players may remove or reduce this bet (bet must be at least table minimum) anytime before it loses. Some casinos in Las Vegas allow players to lay table minimum plus vig if desired and win less than table minimum. Lay bet maximums are equal to the table maximum win, so if a player wishes to lay the 4 or 10, they may bet twice at amount of the table maximum for the win to be table maximum. Other casinos require the minimum bet to win at $20 even at the lowest minimum tables in order to match the $1 vig, this requires a $40 bet. Similar to buy betting, some casinos only take commission on win reducing house edge. Unlike place and buy bets, lay bets are always working even when no point has been established. The player must specify otherwise if they wish to have the bet not working.

If a player is unsure of whether a bet is a single or multi-roll bet, it can be noted that all single-roll bets will be displayed on the playing surface in one color (usually red), while all multi-roll bets will be displayed in a different color (usually yellow).

==== Put ====
A put bet is a bet which allows players to increase or make a Pass line bet after a point has been established (after come-out roll). Players may make a put bet on the Pass line and take odds immediately or increase odds behind if a player decides to add money to an already existing Pass line bet. Put betting also allows players to increase an existing come bet for additional odds after a come point has been established or make a new come bet and take odds immediately behind if desired without a come bet point being established. If increased or added put bets on the Pass line and Come cannot be turned "Off", removed or reduced, but odds bet behind can be turned "Off", removed or reduced. The odds bet is generally required to be the table minimum. Player cannot put bet the Don't Pass or Don't Come. Put betting may give a larger house edge over place betting unless the casino offers high odds.

Put bets are generally allowed in Las Vegas, but not allowed in Atlantic City and Pennsylvania.

Put bets are better than place bets (to win) when betting more than 5-times odds over the flat bet portion of the put bet. For example, a player wants a $30 bet on the six. Looking at two possible bets: 1) Place the six, or 2) Put the six with odds. A $30 place bet on the six pays $35 if it wins. A $30 put bet would be a $5 flat line bet plus $25 (5-times) in odds, and also would pay $35 if it wins. Now, with a $60 bet on the six, the place bet wins $70, where the put bet ($5 + $55 in odds) would pay $71. The player needs to be at a table which not only allows put bets, but also high-times odds, to take this advantage.

==== Hard way ====
Center section of craps table, with typical service bets, which in this generic diagram include, from top to bottom and left to right: Any seven; Hard Six and Hard Ten; Hard Eight and Hard Four; Ace-Deuce (3), Snake Eyes (2), and Boxcars (12); Yo-leven (11) and Yo-leven (11); Any Craps (2, 3, or 12); The C&E / E&C bets stand for Craps and Eleven (2, 3, 11, or 12).

This bet can only be placed on the numbers 4, 6, 8, and 10. In order for this bet to win, the chosen number must be rolled the "hard way" (as doubles) before a 7 or any other non-double combination ("easy way") totaling that number is rolled. For example, a player who bets a hard 6 can only win by seeing a three-three roll come up before any 7 or any easy roll totaling 6 (four-two or five-one); otherwise, the player loses.

In Las Vegas casinos, this bet is generally working, including when no point has been established, unless the player specifies otherwise. In other casinos such as those in Atlantic City, hard ways are not working when the point is off unless the player requests to have it working on the come out roll.

Like single-roll bets, hard way bets can be lower than the table minimum; however, the maximum bet allowed is also lower than the table maximum. The minimum hard way bet can be a minimum one unit. For example, lower stake table minimums of $5 or $10, generally allow minimum hard ways bets of $1. The maximum bet is based on the maximum allowed win from a single roll.

Easy way is not a specific bet offered in standard casinos, but a term used to define any number combination which has two ways to roll. For example, (six-four, or four-six) would be a "10 easy". The 4, 6, 8 or 10 can be made both hard and easy ways. Betting point numbers (which pays off on easy or hard rolls of that number) or single-roll ("hop") bets (e.g., "hop the 2–4" is a bet for the next roll to be an easy six rolled as a two and four) are methods of betting easy ways.

==== Big 6 and Big 8 ====
A player can wager on either the 6 or 8 being rolled before the shooter throws a seven. These wagers are usually avoided by experienced craps players since they create a large house edge by paying even money (1:1) while the true odds are 6:5; experienced players realize the house edge would be reduced by making place bets on the 6 or 8, since those pay more (7:6) and are closer to the true odds. Some casinos (especially all those in Atlantic City) do not even offer the Big 6 and 8. The bets are located in the corners behind the Pass line, and bets may be placed directly by players.

The only real advantage offered by these bets is that they can be bet for the table minimum, whereas a place bet minimum may sometimes be greater than the table minimum. In addition, place bets are usually not working (except by agreement) when the shooter is "coming out", i.e. shooting for a point, whereas Big 6 and 8 bets always work.

=== Single-roll bets ===
Single-roll (proposition) bets are resolved in one dice roll by the shooter. Most of these are called "service bets", and they are located at the center of most craps tables. Only the stickman or a dealer can place a service bet. Single-roll bets can be lower than the table minimum, but the maximum bet allowed is also lower than the table maximum. The maximum bet is based on the maximum allowed win from a single roll. The lowest single-roll bet can be a minimum one unit bet. For example, tables with minimums of $5 or $10 generally allow minimum single-roll bets of $1. Single bets are always working by default unless the player specifies otherwise. The bets include:

2 (snake eyes, or Aces)
Wins if shooter rolls a 2.
3 (ace-deuce)
Wins if the shooter rolls a 3.
Yo
Wins if the shooter rolls 11.
12 (boxcars, midnight, or cornrows)
Wins if shooter rolls a 12.
2 or 12 (hi-lo)
Wins if shooter rolls a 2 or 12. The stickman places this bet on the line dividing the 2 and 12 bets.
Any Craps (Three-Way)
Wins if the shooter rolls 2, 3 or 12.
C & E
A combined bet, a player is betting half their bet on craps (2,3,12) and the other half on 11 (yo). The combine payout is 3:1 on craps and 7:1 on 11 (yo). Another method of calculating the payout is to divide the total bet in half. The player would receive 7:1 minus half the total bet payout on half the total bet for craps and 15:1 minus half the total bet payout on half the total bet for 11 (yo). For example, using this method if a player were to bet $2 on C & E, $1 would receive 7:1 payout on craps minus $1 for the bet on 11 so the total profit would be $6. If an 11 was rolled the player would receive 15:1 minus $1 for the bet on craps so the player's total profit is $14. Both methods of calculation yield the same result so either method can be used. If a player wishes to take the bet down after a win the player would receive the whole bet not half even though only one of the two bets can win per roll. The minimum bet on C & E is double the lowest unit bet allowed at the table. So if the minimum single roll bet is $1 the lowest C & E bet allowed would be $2. Players are, however, able to make odd number bets larger than $2 if desired. One of the two bets will always lose, the other may win.
Any seven
A single roll bet which wins if the shooter rolls a 7 with 4:1 payout. This bet is also nicknamed Big Red, since the 7 on its betting space on the layout is usually large and red, and it is considered bad luck and a breach of etiquette among gamblers to speak the word "seven" at the table.
Horn
This is a bet that involves betting on 1 unit each for 2, 3, 11, and 12 at the same time for the next roll. The bet is actually four separate bets, and pays off depending on which number is actually rolled. The combined payout is 27:4 for 2, 12 and 3:1 for 3, 11. Each individual bet has the same payout as a single bet on the specific numbers, 30:1 for 2 and 12 minus the other three bets, 15:1 for 3 and 11 minus the other three bets. If a player wins the bet he can take down all four bets instead of a single bet even though only one bet can win per roll. Many players, in order to eliminate the confusion of tossing four chips to the center of the table or having change made while bets are being placed, will make a five-unit Horn High bet, which is a four-way bet with the extra unit going to one specific number. For example, if one tosses a $5 chip into the center and says "horn high yo", they are placing four $1 bets on each of the horn numbers and the extra dollar will go on the yo (11). Horn bets are generally required to be in multiples of 4 or 5 with the minimum bet being 4 times the minimum unit allowed. For example, if the single roll minimum at the table is $1 the Horn bet must be $4 or more.
Whirl or World
A five-unit bet that is a combination of a horn and any-seven bet, with the idea that if a seven is rolled the bet is a push, because the money won on the seven is lost on the horn portions of the bet. The combine odds are 26:5 on the 2, 12, 11:5 on the 3, 11, and a push on the 7. Like the C & E and Horn bet, if a player wishes to take down the bet after a win they would receive all five units back. The minimum bet is five of the minimum units. For example, if the minimum single roll bet is $1, the minimum World / Whirl bet is $5.
On the Hop
(also Hop, or Hopping) A single roll bet on any particular combination of the two dice on the next roll including combinations whose sum is 7 (e.g. four-three). For example, if someone bets on "5 and 1" on the hop, they are betting that the next roll will have a five on one die and a one on the other die. The bet pays 15:1 on easy ways (same as a bet on 3 or 11). Hard ways hop pays 30:1 (e.g., 3 and 3 on the hop, same as a bet on 2 or 12). The true odds are 17:1 and 35:1, resulting in a house edge of 11.11% and 13.89% respectively. When presented, hop bets are located at the center of the craps layout with the other proposition bets. If hop bets are not on the craps layout, they still may be bet on by players but they become the responsibility of the boxman to book the bet. Sometimes players may request to hop a whole number. In this case the money on the bet different combinations. For example, if a player says "hop the tens" (six-four, five-five, or four-six) the player must give the dealer an even number bet so it can be divided among the hard and easy ways. If the player gives $10, $5 would be placed on the easy ways 10 with 15:1 odds and $5 would be placed on the hard way with 30:1 odds. If a player wishes to "hop the sevens" there would be three different combinations and six possible ways to roll a 7 (six-one, five-two, four-three, three-four, two-five, or one-six) therefore the player should bet in multiples of 3 so the bet can be divided among each combination with a 15:1 payout minus the other two bets, otherwise if players does not bet in multiples of 3, they would specific which combination has additional units.
Field
This bet is a wager that one of the numbers 2, 3, 4, 9, 10, 11, or 12 will appear on the next roll of the dice. This bet typically pays more (2:1 or 3:1) if 2 or 12 is rolled, and 1:1 if 3, 4, 9, 10, or 11 is rolled. The Field bet is a "Self-Service" Bet. Unlike the other proposition bets which are handled by the dealers or stickman, the field bet is placed directly by the player. Players identify their Field bets by placing them in the Field area directly in front of them or as close to their position as possible. The initial bet and / or any payouts can "ride" through several rolls until they lose, and are assumed to be "riding" by dealers. It is thus the player's responsibility to collect their bet and / or winnings immediately upon payout, before the next dice roll, if they do not wish to let it ride.

=== Player bets ===
Fire Bet: Before the shooter begins, some casinos will allow a bet known as a fire bet to be placed. A fire bet is a bet of as little as $1 and generally up to a maximum of $5 to $10 sometimes higher, depending on casino, made in the hope that the next shooter will have a hot streak of setting and getting many points of different values. As different individual points are made by the shooter, they will be marked on the craps layout with a fire symbol.

The first three points will not pay out on the fire bet, but the fourth, fifth, and sixth will pay out at increasing odds. The fourth point pays at 24-to-1, the fifth point pays at 249-to-1, and the 6th point pays at 999-to-1. (The points must all be different numbers for them to count toward the fire bet.) For example, a shooter who successfully hits a point of 10 twice will only garner credit for the first one on the fire bet. Players must hit the established point in order for it to count toward the fire bet. The payout is determine by the number of points which have been established and hit after the shooter sevens out.

Bonus Craps: Prior to the initial "come out roll", players may place an optional wager (usually a $1 minimum to a maximum $25) on one or more of the three Bonus Craps wagers, "All Small", "All Tall", or "All or Nothing at All." For players to win the "All Small" wager, the shooter must hit all five small numbers (2, 3, 4, 5, 6) before a seven is rolled; similarly, "All Tall" wins if all five high numbers (8, 9, 10, 11, 12) are hit before a seven is rolled.

These bets pay 35-for-1, for a house advantage of 7.76%. "All or Nothing at All" wins if the shooter hits all 10 numbers before a seven is rolled. This pays 176-for-1, for a house edge of 7.46%. For all three wagers, the order in which the numbers are hit does not matter. Whenever a seven is hit, including on the come out roll, all bonus bets lose, the bonus board is reset, and new bonus bets may be placed.

=== Multiple different bets ===
A player may wish to make multiple different bets. For example, a player may wish to bet $1 on all hard ways and the horn. If one of the bets wins, the dealer may automatically replenish the losing bet with profits from the winning bet. In this example, if the shooter rolls a hard 8 (pays 9:1), the horn loses. The dealer may return $5 to the player and place the other $4 on the horn bet which lost. If the player does not want the bet replenished, they should request any or all bets be taken down.

=== Working and not working bets ===
A working bet is a live bet. Bets may also be on the board, but not in play and therefore not working. Pass line and come bets are always working meaning the chips are in play and the player is therefore wagering live money. Other bets may be working or not working depending whether a point has been established or player's choice. Place and buy bets are working by default when a point is established and not working when the point is off unless the player specifies otherwise. Lay bets are always working even if a point has not been established unless the player requests otherwise. At any time, a player may wish to take any bet or bets out of play. The dealer will put an "Off" button on the player's specific bet or bets; this allows the player to keep his chips on the board without a live wager. For example, if a player decides not to wager a place bet mid-roll but wishes to keep the chips on the number, they may request the bet be "not working" or "Off". The chips remain on the table, but the player cannot win from or lose chips which are not working.

The opposite is also allowed. By default place and buy bets are not working without an established point; a player may wish to wager chips before a point has been established. In this case, the player would request the bet be working in which the dealer will place an "On" button on the specified chips.

=== Betting variants ===
These variants depend on the casino and the table, and sometimes a casino will have different tables that use or omit these variants and others.

- 11 is a point number instead of a natural. Rolling an 11 still pays "Yo" center-table bets, but the Pass line does not automatically win (and the Don't Pass line does not automatically lose) when 11 is rolled on the come-out. Making the point pays 3:1 on Pass / Come odds bets (1:3 on Don't Pass / Come odds); all line bets are still even money. This substantially reduces the odds of a natural (from 8 / 36 to 6 / 36) and of making the point in general (since a 3:1 dog is added to the mix). All other things equal, the house edge on the Pass Line and Come bets for this play variation jumps dramatically to 9.75%.
- 12 pays 3:1 on the field. This is generally seen in rooms that have two different table minimums, on the tables with the higher minimums. The lower minimum ones will then have 2:1 odds. For example, the Mirage casino in Las Vegas features 3:1 odds.
- 11 pays 2:1 on the field. This variant is normally used when 12 pays 3:1, and neutralizes the house edge on the field.
- Big 6 / 8 are unavailable. These bets are equivalent to placing or buying 6 or 8 as points, which have better payout for the same real odds, so Big 6 / 8 are rarely used and many casinos simply omit them from the layout. Casinos in Atlantic City are even prohibited by law from offering Big 6 / 8 bets.

== Optimal betting ==
When craps is played in a casino, all bets have a house advantage. That is, it can be shown mathematically that a player will (with 100% probability) lose all their money to the casino in the long run, while in the short run the player is more likely to lose money than make money. There may be players who are lucky and get ahead for a period of time, but in the long run these winning streaks are eroded away. One can slow, but not eliminate, one's average losses by only placing bets with the smallest house advantage.

The Pass / Don't Pass line, Come / Don't Come line, place 6, place 8, buy 4 and buy 10 (only under the casino rules where commission is charged only on wins) have the lowest house edge in the casino, and all other bets will, on average, lose money between three and twelve times faster because of the difference in house edges.

The place bets and buy bets differ from the Pass line and come line, in that place bets and buy bets can be removed at any time, since, while they are multi-roll bets, their odds of winning do not change from roll to roll, whereas Pass line bets and come line bets are a combination of different odds on their first roll and subsequent rolls. The first roll of a Pass line bet is 2:1 advantage for the player (8 wins, 4 losses), but it is "paid for" by subsequent rolls that are at the same disadvantage to the player as the Don't Pass bets were at an advantage. As such, they cannot profitably let the player take down the bet after the first roll. Players can bet or lay odds behind an established point depending on whether it was a Pass / Come or Don't Pass / Don't Come to lower house edge by receiving true odds on the point. Casinos which allow put betting allows players to increase or make new pass / come bets after the come-out roll. This bet generally has a higher house edge than place betting, unless the casino offers high odds.

Conversely, a player can take back (pick up) a Don't Pass or Don't Come bet after the first roll, but this cannot be recommended, because they already endured the disadvantaged part of the combination – the first roll. On that come-out roll, they win just 3 times (2 and 3), while losing 8 of them (7 and 11) and pushing one (12) out of the 36 possible rolls. On the other 24 rolls that become a point, their Don't Pass bet is now to their advantage by 6:3 (4 and 10), 6:4 (5 and 9) and 6:5 (6 and 8). If a player chooses to remove the initial Don't Come and / or Don't Pass line bet, they can no longer lay odds behind the bet and cannot re-bet the same Don't Pass and / or Don't Come number (players must make a new Don't Pass or come bets if desired). However, players can still make standard lay bets odds on any of the point numbers (4,5,6,8,9,10).

Among these, and the remaining numbers and possible bets, there are a myriad of systems and progressions that can be used with many combinations of numbers.

An important alternative metric is house advantage per roll (rather than per bet), which may be expressed in loss per hour. The typical pace of rolls varies depending on the number of players, but 102 rolls per hour is a cited rate for a nearly full table. This same reference states that only "29.6% of total rolls are come out rolls, on average", so for this alternative metric, needing extra rolls to resolve the Pass line bet, for example, is factored. This number then permits calculation of rate of loss per hour, and per the 4 day / 5 hour per day gambling trip:

- $10 Pass line bets 0.42% per roll, $4.28 per hour, $86 per trip
- $10 Place 6,8 bets 0.46% per roll, $4.69 per hour, $94 per trip
- $10 Place 5,9 bets 1.11% per roll, $11.32 per hour, $226 per trip
- $10 Place 4,10 bets 1.19% per roll, $12.14 per hour, $243 per trip
- $1 Single Hardways 2.78% per roll, $2.84 per hour, $56.71 per trip
- $1 All hardways 2.78% per roll, $11.34 per hour, $227 per trip
- $5 All hardways 2.78% per roll, $56.71 per hour, $1134 per trip
- $1 Craps only on come out 3.29% per roll, $3.35 per hour, $67.09 per trip
- $1 Eleven only on come out 3.29% per roll, $3.35 per hour, $67.09 per trip

== Table rules ==
Besides the rules of the game itself, a number of formal and informal rules are commonly applied in the table form of Craps, especially when played in a casino.

To reduce the potential opportunity for switching dice by sleight-of-hand, players are not supposed to handle the dice with more than one hand (such as shaking them in cupped hands before rolling) nor take the dice past the edge of the table. If a player wishes to change shooting hands, they may set the dice on the table, let go, then take them with the other hand.

When throwing the dice, the player is expected to hit the farthest wall at the opposite end of the table (these walls are typically augmented with pyramidal structures to ensure highly unpredictable bouncing after impact). Casinos will sometimes allow a roll that does not hit the opposite wall as long as the dice are thrown past the middle of the table; a very short roll will be nullified as a "no roll". The dice may not be slid across the table and must be tossed. These rules are intended to prevent dexterous players from physically influencing the outcome of the roll.

Players are generally asked not to throw the dice above a certain height (such as the eye level of the dealers). This is both for the safety of those around the table, and to eliminate the potential use of such a throw as a distraction device in order to cheat.

Dice are still considered "in play" if they land on players' bets on the table, the dealer's working stacks, on the marker puck, or with one die resting on top of the other. The roll is invalid if either or both dice land in the boxman's bank, the stickman's bowl (where the extra three dice are kept between rolls), or in the rails around the top of the table where players chips are kept. If one or both dice hits a player or dealer and rolls back onto the table, the roll counts as long as the person being hit did not intentionally interfere with either of the dice, though some casinos will rule "no roll" for this situation. If one or both leave the table, it is also a "no roll", and the dice may either be replaced or examined by the boxman and returned to play.

Shooters may wish to "set" the dice to a particular starting configuration before throwing (such as showing a particular number or combination, stacking the dice, or spacing them to be picked up between different fingers), but if they do, they are often asked to be quick about it so as not to delay the game. Some casinos disallow such rituals to speed up the pace of the game. Some may also discourage or disallow unsanitary practices such as kissing or spitting on the dice.

In most casinos, players are not allowed to hand anything directly to dealers, and vice versa. Items such as cash, checks, and chips are exchanged by laying them down on the table; for example, when "buying in" (paying cash for chips), players are expected to place the cash on the layout: the dealer will take it and then place the chips in front of the player. This rule is enforced in order to allow the casino to easily monitor and record all transfers via overhead surveillance cameras, and to reduce the opportunity for cheating via sleight-of-hand.

Most casinos prohibit "call bets", and may have a warning such as "No Call Bets" printed on the layout to make this clear. This means a player may not call out a bet without also placing the corresponding chips on the table. Such a rule reduces the potential for misunderstanding in loud environments, as well as disputes over the amount that the player intended to bet after the outcome has been decided. Some casinos choose to allow call bets once players have bought-in. When allowed, they are usually made when a player wishes to bet at the last second, immediately before the dice are thrown, to avoid the risk of obstructing the roll.

== Etiquette ==
Craps is among the most social and most superstitious of all gambling games, which leads to an enormous variety of informal rules of etiquette that players may be expected to follow. An exhaustive list of these is beyond the scope of this article, but the guidelines below are most commonly given.

=== Tips ===
Tipping the dealers is universal and expected in Craps. As in most other casino games, a player may simply place (or toss) chips onto the table and say, "For the dealers", "For the crew", etc. In craps, it is also common to place a bet for the dealers. This is usually done one of three ways: by placing an ordinary bet and simply declaring it for the dealers, as a "two-way", or "on top". A "Two-Way" is a bet for both parties: for example, a player may toss in two chips and say "Two Way Hard Eight", which will be understood to mean one chip for the player and one chip for the dealers. Players may also place a stack of chips for a bet as usual, but leave the top chip off-center and announce "on top for the dealers". The dealer's portion is often called a "toke" bet, which comes from the practice of using $1 slot machine tokens to place dealer bets in some casinos.

In some cases, players may also tip each other, for example as a show of gratitude to the thrower for a roll on which they win a substantial bet.

=== Superstition ===
Craps players routinely practice a wide range of superstitious behaviors, and may expect or demand these from other players as well.

Most prominently, it is universally considered bad luck to say the word "seven" (after the "come-out", a roll of 7 is a loss for "pass" bets). Dealers themselves often make significant efforts to avoid calling out the number. When necessary, participants may refer to seven with a "nickname" such as "Big Red" (or just "Red"), "the S-word", etc.

== Dice setting or dice control ==
An approach to achieving an advantage is to "set" the dice in a particular orientation, and then throw them in such a manner that they do not tumble randomly. The theory is that given exactly the same throw from exactly the same starting configuration, the dice will tumble in the same way and therefore show the same or similar values every time.

Casinos take steps to prevent this. The dice are usually required to hit the back wall of the table, which is normally faced with a jagged angular texture such as pyramids, making controlled spins more difficult. There has been no independent evidence that such methods can be successfully applied in a real casino.

== Variants ==
Bank craps is a variation of the original craps game and is sometimes known as Las Vegas Craps. This variant is quite popular in Nevada gambling houses, and its availability online has now made it a globally played game. Bank craps uses a special table layout and all bets must be made against the house. In Bank Craps, the dice are thrown over a wire or a string that is normally stretched a few inches from the table's surface. The lowest house edge (for the Pass / Don't Pass) in this variation is around 1.4%. Generally, if the word "craps" is used without any modifier, it can be inferred to mean this version of the game, to which most of this article refers.

Crapless craps, also known as bastard craps, is a simple version of the original craps game, and was invented by Bob Stupak at Vegas World in the 1980s. The biggest difference between crapless craps and original craps is that the shooter (person throwing the dice) is at a far greater disadvantage and has a house edge of 5.38%. Another difference is that this is one of the craps games in which a player can bet on rolling a 2, 3, 11 or 12 before a 7 is thrown. In crapless craps, 2 and 12 have odds of 11:2 and have a house edge of 7.143% while 3 and 11 have odds of 11:4 with a house edge of 6.25%.

New York Craps is one of the variations of craps played mostly in the Eastern coast of the US, true to its name. History states that this game was actually found and played in casinos in Yugoslavia, the UK and the Bahamas. In this craps variant, the house edge is greater than Las Vegas Craps or Bank craps. The table layout is also different, and is called a double-end-dealer table. This variation is different from the original craps game in several ways, but the primary difference is that New York craps does not allow Come or Don't Come bets. New York Craps Players bet on box numbers like 4, 5, 6, 8, 9, or 10. The overall house edge in New York craps is 5%.

== Card-based variations ==
In order to get around Californian laws barring the payout of a game being directly related to the roll of dice, Indian reservations have adapted the game to substitute cards for dice.

=== Cards replacing dice ===
To replicate the original dice odds exactly without dice or possibility of card-counting, one scheme uses two shuffle machines each with just one deck of Ace through 6 each. Each machine selects one of the 6 cards at random and this is the roll. The selected cards are replaced and the decks are reshuffled for the next roll.

In one variation, two shoes are used, each containing some number of regular card decks that have been stripped down to just the Aces and deuces through sixes. The boxman simply deals one card from each shoe and that is the roll on which bets are settled. Since a card-counting scheme is easily devised to make use of the information of cards that have already been dealt, a relatively small portion (less than 50%) of each shoe is usually dealt in order to protect the house.

In a similar variation, cards representing dice are dealt directly from a continuous shuffling machine (CSM). Typically, the CSM will hold approximately 264 cards, or 44 sets of 1 through 6 spot cards. Two cards are dealt from the CSM for each roll. The game is played exactly as regular craps, but the roll distribution of the remaining cards in the CSM is slightly skewed from the normal symmetric distribution of dice.

Even if the dealer were to shuffle each roll back into the CSM, the effect of buffering a number of cards in the chute of the CSM provides information about the skew of the next roll. Analysis shows this type of game is biased towards the Don't Pass and Don't Come bets. A player betting Don't Pass and Don't Come every roll and laying 10x odds receives a 2% profit on the initial Don't Pass / Don't Come bet each roll. Using a counting system allows the player to attain a similar return at lower variance.

=== Cards mapping physical dice ===
In this game variation, one red deck and one blue deck of six cards each (A through 6), and a red die and a blue die are used. Each deck is shuffled separately, usually by machine. Each card is then dealt onto the layout, into the 6 red and 6 blue numbered boxes. The shooter then shoots the dice. The red card in the red-numbered box corresponding to the red die, and the blue card in the blue-numbered box corresponding to the blue die are then turned over to form the roll on which bets are settled.

Another variation uses a red and a blue deck of 36 custom playing cards each. Each card has a picture of a two-die roll on it – from one-one to six-six. The shooter shoots what looks like a red and a blue die, called "cubes". They are numbered such that they can never throw a pair, and that the blue one will show a higher value than the red one exactly half the time. One such scheme could be two-two-two-five-five-five on the red die and three-three-three-four-four-four on the blue die.

One card is dealt from the red deck and one is dealt from the blue deck. The shooter throws the "cubes" and the color of the cube that is higher selects the color of the card to be used to settle bets. On one such table, an additional one-roll prop bet was offered: If the card that was turned over for the "roll" was either one-one or six-six, the other card was also turned over. If the other card was the "opposite" (six-six or one-one, respectively) of the first card, the bet paid 500:1 for this 647:1 proposition.

And additional variation uses a single set of 6 cards, and regular dice. The roll of the dice maps to the card in that position, and if a pair is rolled, then the mapped card is used twice, as a pair.

== Rules of play against other players ("Street Craps") ==
Recreational or informal playing of craps outside of a casino is referred to as street craps or private craps. The most notable difference between playing street craps and bank craps is that there is no bank or house to cover bets in street craps. Players must bet against each other by covering or fading each other's bets for the game to be played. If money is used instead of chips and depending on the laws of where it is being played, street craps can be an illegal form of gambling.

There are many variations of street craps. The simplest way is to either agree on or roll a number as the point, then roll the point again before rolling a seven. Unlike more complex proposition bets offered by casinos, street craps has more simplified betting options. The shooter is required to make either a Pass or a Don't Pass bet if he wants to roll the dice. Another player must choose to cover the shooter to create a stake for the game to continue.

If there are several players, the rotation of the player who must cover the shooter may change with the shooter (comparable to a blind in poker). The person covering the shooter will always bet against the shooter. For example, if the shooter made a "Pass" bet, the person covering the shooter would make a "Don't Pass" bet to win. Once the shooter is covered, other players may make Pass / Don't Pass bets, or any other proposition bets, as long as there is another player willing to cover.

== In popular culture ==
Due to the random nature of the game, in popular culture a "crapshoot" is often used to describe an action with an unpredictable outcome.

The prayer or invocation "Baby needs a new pair of shoes!" is associated with shooting craps.

=== Floating craps ===
Floating craps is an illegal operation of craps. The term floating refers to the practice of the game's operators using portable tables and equipment to quickly move the game from location to location to stay ahead of the law enforcement authorities. The term may have originated in the 1930s when Benny Binion (later known for founding the downtown Las Vegas hotel Binion's) set up an illegal craps game utilizing tables created from portable crates for the Texas Centennial Exposition.

The 1950 Broadway musical Guys and Dolls features a major plot point revolving around a floating craps game.

In the 1950s and 1960s The Sands Hotel in Las Vegas had a craps table that floated in the swimming pool, as a joke reference to the notoriety of the term.

=== Records ===
A Golden Arm is a craps player who rolls the dice for longer than one hour without losing. Likely the first known Golden Arm was Oahu native Stanley Fujitake, who rolled 118 times without sevening out in 3 hours and 6 minutes at the California Hotel and Casino on May 28, 1989.

The current record for length of a "hand" (successive rounds won by the same shooter) is 154 rolls including 25 passes by Patricia DeMauro of New Jersey, lasting 4 hours and 18 minutes, at the Borgata in Atlantic City, New Jersey, on May 23–24, 2009. She bested by over an hour the record held for almost 20 years – that of Fujitake.

== See also ==
- Craps principle
- Dice
- Glossary of craps terms
- "Gonna Roll the Bones"
- Guys and Dolls
- Illusion of control
- Probability
- Rattle and snap (game)
