= Craps principle =

In probability theory, the craps principle is a theorem about event probabilities under repeated iid trials. Let $E_1$ and $E_2$ denote two mutually exclusive events which might occur on a given trial. Then the probability that $E_1$ occurs before $E_2$ equals the conditional probability that $E_1$ occurs given that $E_1$ or $E_2$ occur on the next trial, which is

$$\operatorname{P}[ E_1 \, \, \text{before}\,\, E_2]=\operatorname{P}\left[E_1\mid E_1\cup E_2\right]=\frac{\operatorname{P}[E_1]}{\operatorname{P}[E_1]+\operatorname{P}[E_2]}$$

The events $E_1$ and $E_2$ need not be collectively exhaustive (if they are, the result is trivial).

== Proof ==
Let $A$ be the event that $E_1$ occurs before $E_2$. Let $B$ be the event that neither $E_1$ nor $E_2$ occurs on a given trial. Since $B$, $E_1$ and $E_2$ are mutually exclusive and collectively exhaustive for the first trial, we have

$$\operatorname{P}(A) = \operatorname{P}(E_1)\operatorname{P}(A \mid E_1) + \operatorname{P}(E_2)\operatorname{P}(A \mid E_2) + \operatorname{P}(B) \operatorname{P}(A \mid B) = \operatorname{P}(E_1) + \operatorname{P}(B) \operatorname{P}(A \mid B)$$

and $\operatorname{P}(B) = 1 - \operatorname{P}(E_1) - \operatorname{P}(E_2)$. Since the trials are i.i.d., we have $\operatorname{P}(A \mid B) = \operatorname{P}(A)$. Using $\operatorname{P}(A|E_1)=1,\quad \operatorname{P}(A|E_2)=0$ and solving the displayed equation for $\operatorname{P}(A)$ gives the formula

$$\operatorname{P}(A) = \frac{\operatorname{P}(E_1)}{\operatorname{P}(E_1)+\operatorname{P}(E_2)}$$.

== Application ==
If the trials are repetitions of a game between two players, and the events are

$$E_1:\mathrm{ player\ 1\ wins}$$
$$E_2:\mathrm{ player\ 2\ wins}$$

then the craps principle gives the respective conditional probabilities of each player winning a certain repetition, given that someone wins (i.e., given that a draw does not occur). In fact, the result is only affected by the relative marginal probabilities of winning $\operatorname{P}[E_1]$ and $\operatorname{P}[E_2]$ ; in particular, the probability of a draw is irrelevant.

=== Stopping ===
If the game is played repeatedly until someone wins, then the conditional probability above is the probability that the player wins the game. This is illustrated below for the original game of craps, using an alternative proof.

== Craps example ==
If the game being played is craps, then this principle can greatly simplify the computation of the probability of winning in a certain scenario. Specifically, if the first roll is a 4, 5, 6, 8, 9, or 10, then the dice are repeatedly re-rolled until one of two events occurs:

$$E_1:\text{ the original roll (called ‘the point’) is rolled (a win) }$$
$$E_2:\text{ a 7 is rolled (a loss) }$$

Since $E_1$ and $E_2$ are mutually exclusive, the craps principle applies. For example, if the original roll was a 4, then the probability of winning is

$$\frac{3/36}{3/36 + 6/36}=\frac{1}{3}$$

This avoids having to sum the infinite series corresponding to all the possible outcomes:

$$\sum_{i=0}^{\infty}\operatorname{P}[\text{first i rolls are ties,}(i+1)^{\text{th}}\text{roll is ‘the point’}]$$

Mathematically, we can express the probability of rolling $i$ ties followed by rolling the point:

$$\operatorname{P}[\text{first i rolls are ties, }(i+1)^{\text{th}} \text{roll is ‘the point’}]
= (1-\operatorname{P}[E_1]-\operatorname{P}[E_2])^i\operatorname{P}[E_1]$$

The summation becomes an infinite geometric series:

$$\sum_{i=0}^{\infty} (1-\operatorname{P}[E_1]-\operatorname{P}[E_2])^i\operatorname{P}[E_1]
= \operatorname{P}[E_1] \sum_{i=0}^{\infty} (1-\operatorname{P}[E_1]-\operatorname{P}[E_2])^i$$

$$= \frac{\operatorname{P}[E_1]}{1-(1-\operatorname{P}[E_1]-\operatorname{P}[E_2])}
= \frac{\operatorname{P}[E_1]}{\operatorname{P}[E_1]+\operatorname{P}[E_2]}$$

which agrees with the earlier result.
