= Pasadena (disambiguation) =

Pasadena is a city in Los Angeles County, California, United States.

Pasadena may also refer to:

== Places ==
=== Australia ===
- Pasadena, South Australia, a suburb of Adelaide in the City of Mitcham

=== Canada ===
- Pasadena, Newfoundland and Labrador, an incorporated town

=== United States ===
- East Pasadena, California, a census-designated place in Los Angeles County
- South Pasadena, California, a city in Los Angeles County
- Pasadena, Florida, a neighborhood of St. Petersburg, a city in Pinellas County
- South Pasadena, Florida, a city in Pinellas County
- Pasadena, Lexington, a neighborhood in Lexington, Fayette County, Kentucky
- Pasadena, Maryland, a census-designated place in Anne Arundel County
- Pasadena Hills, Missouri, a city in St. Louis County
- Pasadena Park, Missouri, a village in St. Louis County
- Pasadena, Texas, a city in Harris County

== Entertainment ==
- Pasadena (album), released in 2007 by rock band Ozma
- "Pasadena" (John Paul Young song), 1972
- Pasadena (Tinashe song), 2021
- Pasadena (TV series), a 2001 American primetime soap opera
- "Pasadena", or "Home in Pasadena", a 1923 song by Harry Warren
- "Pasadena", a 1981 single by Maywood (duo)
- "Pasadena", a 2020 episode of Young Sheldon
- Pasadena O'Possum, a character in the Crash Bandicoot video-game series

== Other ==
- USS Pasadena, a list of US Navy ships with the name
- Pasadena ("Perfect All-Singing All-Dancing Editorial and Notation Application"), an application for editing the Oxford English Dictionary

== See also ==
- The Pasadenas, an R&B/pop group from the United Kingdom
