= Dice control =

Claims about dice throwing skills

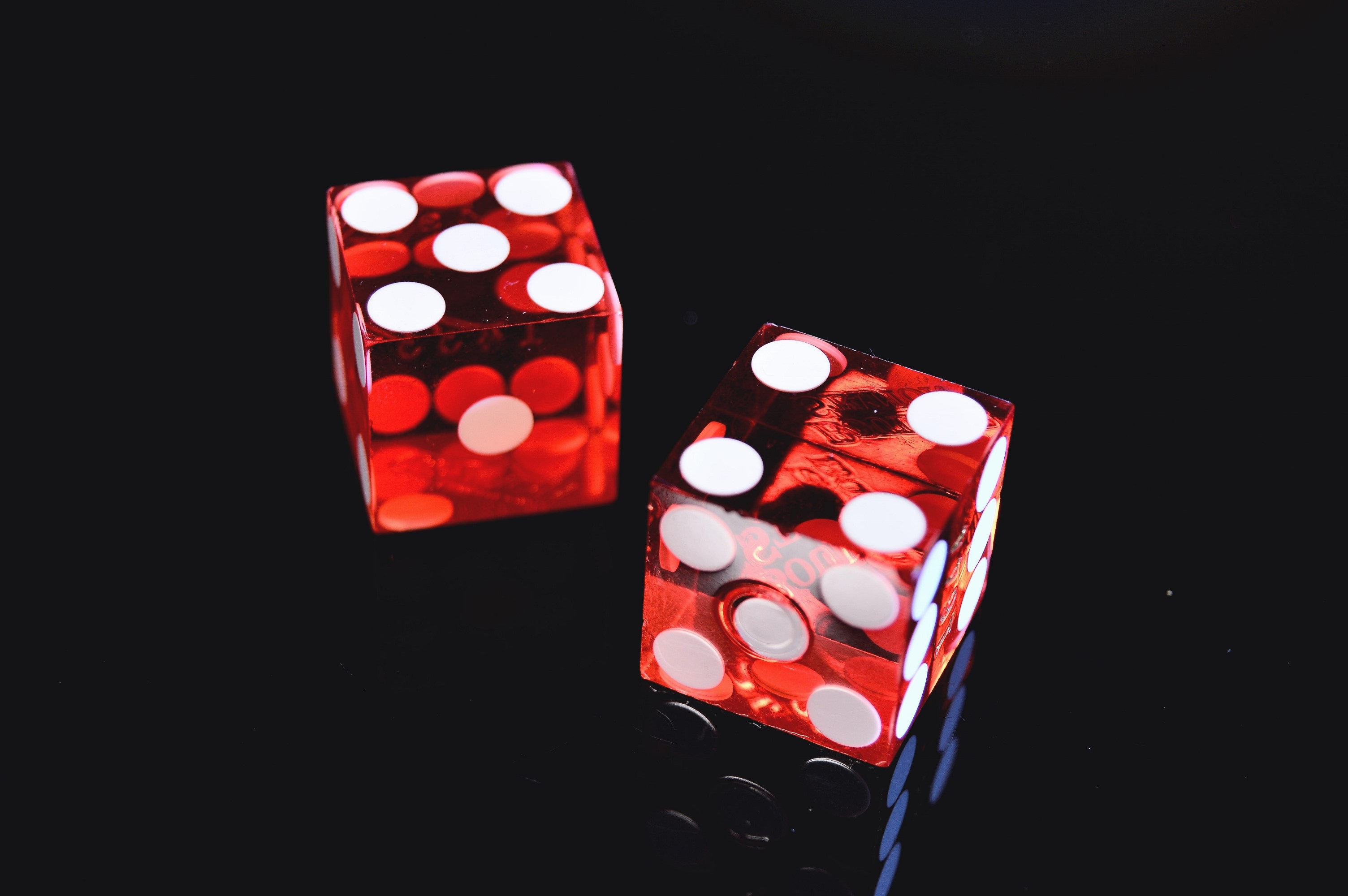
A pair of standard casino dice, which are specifically designed to be perfectly square and evenly weighted

Dice control in casino craps is a controversial theory where proponents claim that individuals can learn to carefully toss the dice so as to influence the outcome. A small but dedicated community of dice shooters claim proof of dice influencing in casino conditions. The concept of such precision shooting claims to elevate craps from a random game of chance to a sport, like bowling, darts, or pool. Many within the advantage gambling community still doubt if dice control can overcome the house advantage on craps.

== Controlled shooting ==
The concept of "controlled shooting" goes beyond simply "setting the dice" prior to shooting. It purports to limit the rotation of the dice during the roll. The theory is that if the dice are properly gripped and tossed at the correct angle they will land just before the back wall of the craps table, then gently touch the wall, greatly increasing the probability of their remaining on the same axis. If executed properly and consistently this technique would be able to shift the game's long-term odds from the house's favor to the player's favor.

Jim Klimesh, director of casino operations for Indiana's Empress Casino Hammond believes it is sometimes possible to control the dice with certain throws that do not hit the back wall of the craps table. One example is the "army blanket roll", named after the playing surface of the dice games of American servicemen during World War II. In the army blanket roll, a player sets the dice on an axis and gently rolls or slides them down the table. If the shooter is successful, the dice will not leave the axis they are rolled on and will come to rest before hitting the back wall. A successful shooter would affect the odds significantly.

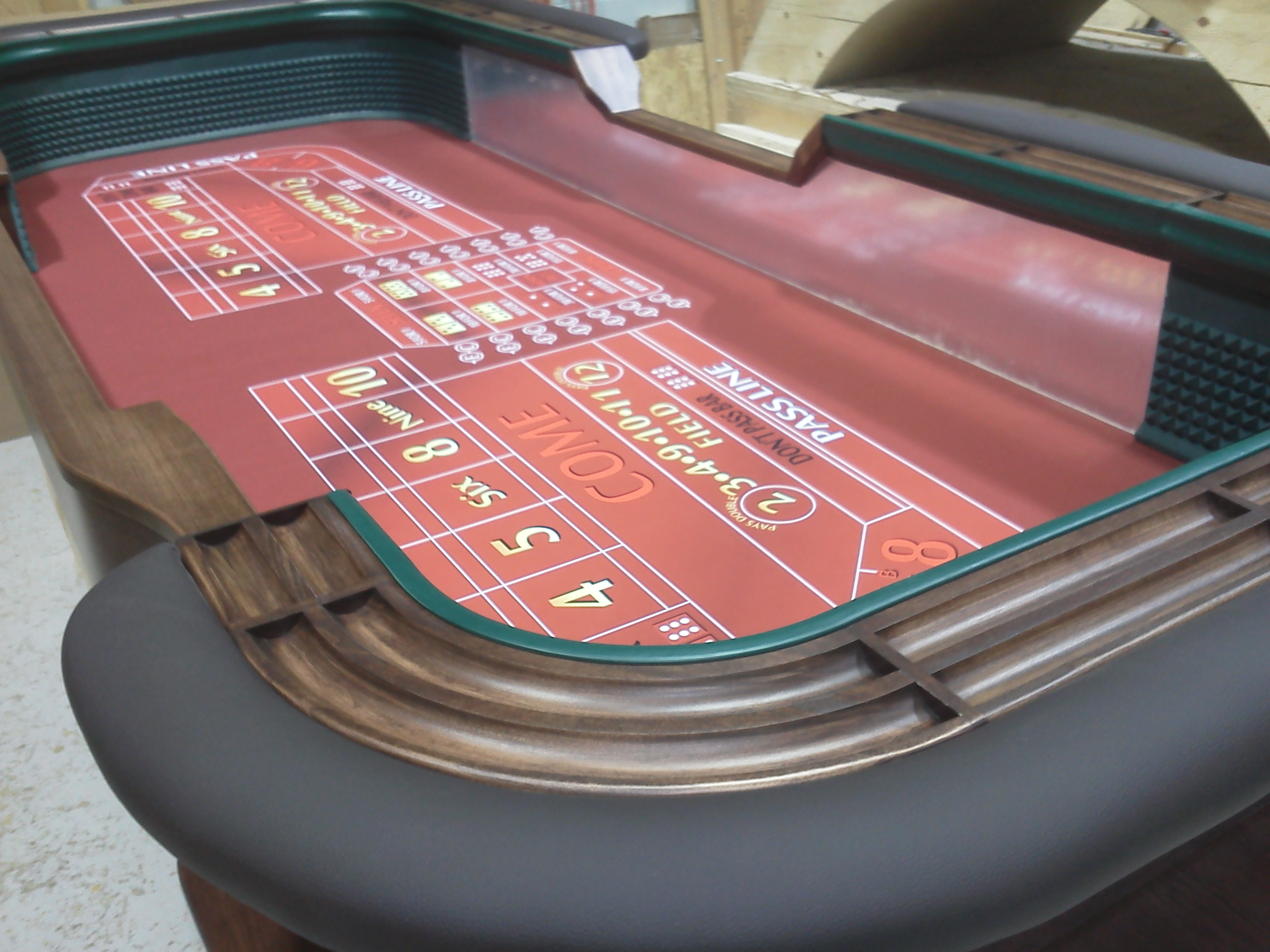
Craps table, showing pyramidal structures lining interior vertical walls

In most craps tables, the inside vertical wall is lined with a foam rubber surface patterned to ensure the dice rebound in a random manner. Since most casinos require the dice must touch the wall and bounce off a surface of rubber pyramids for a throw to be valid, the chances of adequately controlling the roll sufficient to alter the odds are much slimmer, no matter what axis the dice were on before they hit. In some casinos, a string which the shooter must clear is stretched across the center of the craps table, at a height just less than the size of the dice used, which effectively eliminates many controlled rolling strategies. Dice control proponents advocate a throw that gently bounces off of the back wall and comes to rest after barely touching it.

=== Notable proponents ===
John Scarne describes several methods of controlled dice rolling in Scarne on Dice (1974), along with strategies to detect or defeat them.

Chris Pawlicki (author of Get The Edge At Craps: How to Control the Dice) explains the math and science behind dice control. Pawlicki and Jerry L. Patterson co-developed PARR (Patterson Rhythm Roll) in 1997, which claims to be the first course on how to set and control dice.

Stanford Wong, well-known advantage player and gaming author, also discusses dice control in his book Wong on Dice (2005).

=== Experimentation ===
Early experiments conducted on the subject of dice control had inconclusive results. In a more sophisticated study published in 2020, a purpose-built dice-throwing machine failed to achieve any significant advantages under several scenarios, casting serious doubt on the potential for dice control to be successfully practiced by humans.
