= Pasadena, Lexington =

Neighborhood in Lexington, Kentucky

Coordinates: 38°00′40″N 84°32′40″W

Pasadena is a neighborhood in southwestern Lexington, Kentucky, United States. Its name is derived from its location just south of Pasadena Drive. All streets in the neighborhood are named after western American cities. Its boundaries are a combination of New Circle Road, Waco Road, and Nakomi Drive to the south, Harrodsburg Road to the west, Pasadena Drive to the north, and a combination of Waco Road and Clays Mill Road to the east.

Neighborhood statistics

- Area: 0.276 square miles (0.71 km^{2})
- Population: 815
- Population density: 2,953 persons per square mile
- Median household income: $56,351

Public school districts

- Elementary: Clays Mill Elementary School
- Middle: Jessie Clark Middle School
- High: Lafayette High School
