= Natural (gambling) =

A natural is a term in several gambling games; in each case it refers to one or two specific good outcomes, usually for the player, and often involves achieving a particular score in the shortest and fastest manner possible.

== Examples ==
In blackjack, the best possible hand for the player is to reach a score of 21 with exactly two cards, which necessarily involves an Ace and a ten-valued card (a 10, jack, queen, or king). This hand, which usually defeats any other hand of 21 and carries a higher payout of winnings, is referred to as a "blackjack", or a "natural". Traditionally, a natural in blackjack pays 3:2. In recent years, however, some casinos have used the payout ratio of 6:5 for a greater house edge.

In craps, a natural is a roll of two dice with a score of 7 or 11 on the come out roll. This will lead to a win for the players who wagered money on the Pass or Come bet, but a loss for players betting Don't Pass, or Don't Come.

In baccarat, a natural is a two-card hand totaling 8 or 9, for either the player or the banker. Natural 9 beats natural 8.
