= British Fantasy Award for Best Fantasy Novel =

British literary award

- Awarded for: Works over 40,000 wohrds
- Country: United Kingdom
- Presented by: British Fantasy Society
- First award: 2012; 14 years ago
- Most recent winner: Upon a Starlit Tide by Kell Woods
- Website: britishfantasysociety.org
- Related: British Fantasy Award for Best Novel; British Fantasy Award for Best Horror Novel

The British Fantasy Award for Best Fantasy Novel, also known as the Robert Holdstock Award, is a literary award given annually as part of the British Fantasy Awards. The award is named after British author Robert Holdstock. The British Fantasy Society originally awarded only one Best Novel award annually. After the awards were reorganized in 2012, the best novel category was divided into fantasy and horror categories.

== Winners and shortlists ==
* Winners

Year	Author	Work	Publisher	Ref.
2012	Jo Walton*	Among Others	Tor Books	
2013	Graham Joyce*	Some Kind of Fairy Tale	Gollancz	
2013	Joe Abercrombie	Red Country	Gollancz	
2013	Margo Lanagan	The Brides of Rollrock Island	David Fickling Books	
2013	China Miéville	Railsea	Macmillan Publishers	
2013	Lou Morgan	Blood and Feathers	Solaris Books	
2014	Sofia Samatar*	A Stranger in Olondria	Small Beer Press	
2014	Neil Gaiman	The Ocean at the End of the Lane	Headline Publishing Group	
2014	Lou Morgan	Blood and Feathers: Rebellion	Solaris Books	
2014	Emma Newman	Between Two Thorns	Angry Robot	
2014	Tom Pollock	The Glass Republic	Jo Fletcher	
2015	Frances Hardinge*	Cuckoo Song	Macmillan Children's	
2015	Robert Jackson Bennett	City of Stairs	Jo Fletcher	
2015	Edward Cox	The Relic Guild	Gollancz	
2015	K. T. Davies	Breed	Fox Spirit	
2015	Lavie Tidhar	A Man Lies Dreaming	Hodder & Stoughton	
2015	Neil Williamson	The Moon King	NewCon	
2016	Naomi Novik*	Uprooted	Macmillan Publishers	
2016	Joe Abercrombie	Half a War	Harper Voyager	
2016	Zen Cho	Sorcerer to the Crown	Macmillan Publishers	
2016	Silvia Moreno-Garcia	Signal to Noise	Solaris Books	
2016	Adrian Tchaikovsky	Guns of the Dawn	Tor Books	
2016	Jen Williams	The Iron Ghost	Headline Publishing Group	
2017	Adrian Tchaikovsky*	The Tiger and the Wolf	Pan Books	
2017	Steven Poore	The High King's Vengeance	Kristell Ink / Grimbold Books	
2017	Jen Williams	The Silver Tide	Headline Publishing Group	
2017	Joanne Hall	The Summer Goddess	Kristell Ink / Grimbold Books	
2018	Jen Williams*	The Ninth Rain	Headline Publishing Group	
2018	R. J. Barker	Age of Assassins	Orbit Books	
2018	Anna Smith Spark	The Court of Broken Knives	Harper Voyager	
2018	Jeannette Ng	Under the Pendulum Sun	Angry Robot	
2019	Jen Williams*	The Bitter Twins	Headline Publishing Group	
2019	Tasha Suri	Empire of Sand	Orbit Books	
2019	Robert Jackson Bennett	Foundryside	Jo Fletcher	
2019	Juliet E. McKenna	The Green Man's Heir	Wizard's Tower Press	
2019	Aliya Whiteley	The Loosening Skin	Unsung Stories	
2019	Peter McLean	Priest of Bones	Jo Fletcher	
2020	R. J. Barker*	The Bone Ships	Orbit Books	
2020	Helen Marshall	The Migration	Titan Books	
2020	Jen Williams	The Poison Song	Headline Publishing Group	
2020	Alix E. Harrow	The Ten Thousand Doors of January	Orbit Books	
2021	Alix E. Harrow*	The Once and Future Witches	Redhook Books	
2021	Andrea Stewart	The Bone Shard Daughter	Orbit Books	
2021	Lavie Tidhar	By Force Alone	Tor Books	
2021	N. K. Jemisin	The City We Became	Orbit Books	
2021	Rym Kechacha	Dark River	Unsung Stories	
2021	Tiffani Angus	Threading the Labyrinth	Unsung Stories	
2022	Shelley Parker-Chan*	She Who Became the Sun	Tor Books	
2022	Mike Brooks	The Black Coast	Orbit Books	
2022	Tasha Suri	The Jasmine Throne	Orbit Books	
2022	Lucy Holland	Sistersong	Tor Books	
2022	Lorraine Wilson	This is Our Undoing	Luna Press	
2022	C. L. Clark	The Unbroken	Orbit Books	
2023	Simon Jimenez*	The Spear Cuts Through Water	Del Rey Books	
2023	Sara A. Mueller	The Bone Orchard	Tor Books	
2023	Cat Hellisen	Cast Long Shadows	Luna Press	
2023	Oliver K. Langmead	Glitterati	Titan Books	
2023	Tasha Suri	The Oleander Sword	Orbit Books	
2023	David Green	Path of War	Eerie River Publishing	
2024	Jen Williams*	Talonsister	Titan Books	
2024	Samantha Shannon	A Day of Fallen Night	Bloomsbury Publishing	
2024	David Green	At Eternity’s Gates	Eerie River Publishing	
2024	David Green	Beyond Sundered Seas	Eerie River Publishing	
2024	Wole Talabi	Shigidi and the Brass Head of Obalufon	DAW Books	
2025	O. O. Sangoyomi*	Masquerade	Forge Books	
2025	Juliet E. McKenna	The Green Man's War	Wizard's Tower Press	
2025	Eliza Chan	Fathomfolk	Orbit Books	
2025	Sarah Rees Brennan	Long Live Evil	Orbit Books	
2025	David Green	A Shadow Over Haven	Eerie River Publishing	
2026	Kell Woods*	Upon a Starlit Tide	Titan Books	
2026	Shona Kinsella	Daughters of Nicnevin	Flame Tree Publishing	
2026	David Green	Magic, Maps, and Mischief	Independently Published	
2026	M H Ayinde	A Song of Legends Lost	Orbit Books	
2026	Annabel Campbell	The Outcast Mage	Orbit Books	
2026	Richard Swan	Grave Empire	Orbit Books	
