= The Trials of Empire =

2024 novel by Richard Swan

- Author: Richard Swan
- Series: Empire of the Wolf
- Publisher: Orbit Books
- Publication date: 2024
- Preceded by: The Tyranny of Faith
- Followed by: Grave Empire

The Trials of Empire is a 2024 fantasy novel by Richard Swan. It is the third novel in the Empire of the Wolf trilogy.

== Synopsis ==
The book is set in the fictional Sovan Empire, and follows Konrad Vonvalt and his apprentice Helena Sedanka as they attempt to stop the empire's fall.

== Reception ==
The book received mostly positive reviews from critics who praised it as a conclusion to the trilogy, noting its characterization, plotting and worldbuilding as highlights. Kirkus Reviews gave it a mixed review, writing that "despite careful worldbuilding and tense plotting, the book barely escapes being a slog."

Adrian Collins of Grimdark Magazine considered the book to be a satisfying conclusion to the trilogy and praised the character development of Helena and Konrad, while lamenting the exclusion of the legal procedural elements from previous installments. Mark Yon of SFFWorld described the beginning of the book as slow and needlessly detailed, but praised it as an overall conclusion to the series.

Andrew Mathers of The Quill to Live gave the book a negative review, stating that it "[turned] a series with an intriguing spooky premise [in]to a baffling bad time". Mathers criticized the book for relying on exposition and exclusion of legal or mystery elements, while describing the protagonist Helena as uninteresting and frustrating. He gave the book a score of 3/10.
