= Peter McLean =

Peter McLean may refer to:

- Peter McLean (politician) (1837–1924), member of the Queensland Legislative Assembly
- Peter McLean (cabinet maker) (fl. 1860s), Australian furniture maker
- Peter McLean (Australian rules footballer) (1941–2009), represented both Melbourne and Carlton in the VFL in the 1960s
- Peter Douglas McLean (1853–1936), educator, physician and political figure in Ontario, Canada
- Peter McLean (rugby union) (born 1954), Australian rugby union player
- Peter McLean (rugby league), Australian rugby league footballer
- Peter McLean (singer), Australian folk singer
- Peter McLean (author), British author
