= Unraveller =

Unraveller may refer to:

- Unraveller (novel), a young adult fantasy novel by Frances Hardinge
- The Unraveller, a deity in the novel series The Fionavar Tapestry by Guy Gavriel Kay
- Unraveller, a fictional entity in the novel Darkfall by Isobelle Carmody

== See also ==
- Unravel (disambiguation)
- Unraveled (disambiguation)
- Unravelling (disambiguation)
