= The Tyranny of Faith =

2023 novel by Richard Swan

- Author: Richard Swan
- Series: Empire of the Wolf
- Publisher: Orbit Books
- Publication date: 2023
- Preceded by: The Justice of Kings
- Followed by: The Trials of Empire

The Tyranny of Faith is a 2023 fantasy novel by Richard Swan. It is the second novel in the Empire of the Wolf trilogy.

== Synopsis ==
The novel is set in the fictional Sovan Empire. Imperial Justice Sir Konrad Vonvalt and his protege Helena Sedanka are charged with investigating heresy and evil magic in Sova. Having learned that imperial magistrates are colluding with a traitorous priest to build up an army and a magical arsenal to seize the throne, Helena and Konrad hasten to the capital where they inform the emperor of the plot.

== Reception ==
The book received mostly positive reviews from critics. Andrew Mather, writing for A Quill to Live, described it as an improvement over the first book in the trilogy. He gave it a score of 9/10, highlighting the interactions between complex characters and insightful historical and political commentary. The Fantasy Reviews also considered it an improvement over the first book, noting that the character of Helena had become more complex and the plot's stakes had become higher. Adrian Collins, in a review for Grimdark Magazine, praised the nuanced portrayal of the Sovan Empire's political intrigues and society, comparing the setting to ancient Rome and the Crusader States. Collins gave the book a score of 5/5 points. Kirkus Reviews gave the book a starred review, describing it as "complex and dark historical fantasy series inspired by medieval state-military-church political conflicts."
