= A Skinful of Shadows =

2017 young adult novel by Frances Hardinge

- Author: Frances Hardinge
- Genre: Children's or young adult fiction, Paranormal, Historical fiction
- Published: 3 May 2018
- Publisher: Macmillan
- Publication place: UK
- Pages: 448
- Awards: Nominated for Waterstones Book of the Year 2017.
- ISBN: 9781509835508

A Skinful of Shadows is a 2017 children's or young adults' paranormal historical fiction novel by Frances Hardinge. Her seventh novel, it revolves around Makepeace Felmotte, a girl with the inherited ability to see and absorb ghosts. It is set during the First English Civil War, and in particular the Siege of Oxford. The book was received positively by critics and was short-listed for the Waterstones Book of the Year 2017.

== Synopsis ==
During the First English Civil War, Makepeace lives with her mother in a Puritan village close to London. When her mother dies in a riot between the Parliamentarians and the Royalists, she is sent to live with her deceased father's relatives in Grizehayes, a fictional fortress in the north of England. Makepeace has the inherited trait that allows her to store the spirits of recently deceased people or animals inside herself, like the rest of her father's family. The elders at Grizehayes store the spirits of their notable deceased family members inside living vessels. Discovering that her relatives keep her alive purely as a spare vessel for the spirits, she flees to Oxford and becomes entangled in the conflict of the war herself.

== Reception ==
A Skinful of Shadows received positive reviews from critics. The Guardian writes: "...a wonderful, resonant narrative whose subtlety and insight will challenge, entertain and enchant."

Strange Horizons writes "...to the question, “does Hardinge manage the notorious and eventful historical context in a way that avoids outrageous distortion while still primarily serving the needs of her plot?”—yes. To the question, “does she, as in previous works (viz. The Lie Tree, 2015) continue to depict her main female and male characters as prickly, intelligent, and realistically fallible; their friendship valuable for its ability to deepen through repair, rather than its shot-proof and foreordained perfection?”—indeed."

Crime Review writes "Hardinge’s writing is lyrical and insightful, and the book wears it research lightly whilst skilfully weaving the sights, sounds and smells of the English Civil War into its very fabric."
