= The Bone Shard War =

2023 fantasy novel by Andrea Stewart

- Author: Andrea Stewart
- Language: English
- Series: The Drowning Empire
- Release number: 3
- Genre: Fantasy
- Publisher: Orbit Books
- Publication date: 18 Apr 2023
- Publication place: United States
- Pages: 656 (Hardcover)
- ISBN: 9780316541541
- Preceded by: The Bone Shard Emperor

The Bone Shard War is a 2023 fantasy novel by Andrea Stewart. It is the concluding entry in the author's Drowning Empire trilogy, following The Bone Shard Daughter (2020) and The Bone Shard Emperor (2021). It concludes the story of Lin Sukai and her companions, who fight for the future of the Empire in the face of factional conflicts.

== Plot ==
Two years after the events of the previous novel, Lin's rule over the Empire is precarious. She has few trusted advisors and believes Jovis to be dead. She visits the island of Riya, where Governor Iloh is fomenting rebellion due to the ban on witstone mining. She offers to make Iloh her consort as a political alliance.

Meanwhile, Kaphra has taken Mephi hostage and controls Jovis using bone shard magic. Jovis is forced into piracy, attacking Imperial ships and stealing their witstone shipments.

Lin meets with Dione. (Note: Gio is revealed to be Dione, one of the oldest and most powerful Alanga.) Dione attempts to steal Lin's white-bladed sword, but she foils his plot. Meanwhile, the Shardless Few attack Nephilanu and capture Ranami. Lin tracks another white-bladed sword. She promises the sword to Phalue, who will use it to rescue her wife and daughter on Nephilanu.

Meanwhile, Kaphra orders Jovis to search for another white-bladed sword. Jovis initially recovers the sword, but Ragan takes it from him. Nisong convinces Ragan to join Dione and the Shardless Few. Nisong and Ragan have sex, but their relationship remains contentious.

Lin heads to Maila, pursued by Dione, Ragan, and Nisong. Lin's ship arrives first. She retrieves the sword and gives it to Phalue. Dione boards Lin's ship. She offers him her two swords in exchange for the Shardless Few leaving Nephilanu and acknowledging her as Emperor. He refuses and attacks her. Lin throws a sword into the ocean, buying time to flee while Dione retrieves it. Lin uses a fishing village as human shields, knowing that Dione abhors civilian casualties. Ragan accuses Dione of weakness, sparking a mutiny and leaving with some of the Shardless Few.

Kaphra orders Jovis to enter a monastery and murder two Alanga. Ragan sees Jovis and pursues. The monks offer protection to Jovis. He learns that he is able to subvert Kaphra's commands, so he does not kill the Alanga.

On Riya Island, Lin marries Iloh. Jovis interrupts the wedding, knowing that Iloh and Ragan have conspired against the Emperor. Iloh makes a temporary alliance with Lin. Ragan kills some of Lin's guards and flees. Lin examines the corpse of an ossalen that Ragan killed with his white-bladed sword; its bones have become witstone. She realizes that all of the islands of the Empire were once ossalen. Ragan flees into a witstone mine and causes the island to start sinking. Jovis and Mephi escape the sinking island; they are picked up by Kaphra. Jovis stages a mutiny against Kaphra, who is swept overboard.

Ragan convinces many of the Shardless Few to join him and attack Imperial Island. Phalue rescues her wife. Ranami becomes leader of the remaining Shardless Few.

Lin returns to Imperial. She finds the palace besieged by both Dione's and Ragan's followers. Jovis reunites with Lin, who removes the bone shards that Kaphra used to control him. Lin and Jovis fight against the combined forces of Dione, Ragan, and Nisong. The enemy armies breach the palace gates. Lin agrees to abdicate; Dione accepts her surrender. Nisong allows Lin to escape.

Nisong rejects her identity, realizing she cannot replace the original Nisong; she decides to go by the name Sand once again. Sand betrays Ragan and joins Lin. They fight Ragan, who stabs Sand.

Ranami makes an alliance with Dione to fight Ragan. As their forces approach Ragan, he flees and attempts to sink the island. Jovis fights Ragan at the heart of the island; Ragan stabs him in the stomach. The ossalen that was once Imperial Island grants strength to Jovis, who is able to kill Ragan. Lin uses the pool in Shiyen's laboratory to heal Jovis, at the cost of many of his memories. Lin heals Sand uses shards from Thrana's horns. Sand bonds with Lozhi, Ragan's former ossalen, becoming an Alanga. She builds home for refugees from Riya, hoping to reverse some of the damage that her actions have caused.

Lin formally abdicates, leaving Ranami to form a Council instead of an Empire. Jovis says farewell to Lin and leaves to rediscover his identity. Years later, Thrana has become an island. Lin researches Alanga artifacts. Jovis arrives on the shore, asking if they can build new memories together.

== Background ==
In an interview with Daniel Roman, Stewart discussed her process for writing the final book in the trilogy. The Bone Shard War begins with a two-year time skip. Initially, Stewart had written material that took place during these two years. She stated that "structurally it just wasn’t going to work, especially given what some of the characters have been going through and have been through in that two-year time jump... So I definitely tossed material from that period of time."

== Reception ==
Leah von Essen of Booklist gave the novel a starred review. Von Essen called the novel epic in scope, praising its quick pace and complex characters. The review stated that Stewart "does justice to the characters and story lines" that were begun in the previous two entries.

Writing for Paste, Lacy Baugher Milas called the book "an engrossing, thrilling series conclusion". Milas praised the plotting and quick pace, noting that the novel runs over 600 pages but does not drag. The same review praised the book's complex worldbuilding, praising the author's use of foreshadowing. Milas also felt that the inclusion of multiple point-of-view characters was a positive aspect of the novel, as "all the various factions ... have genuine and compelling reasons for their actions."

Tobias Carroll of Reactor appreciated the time skip, despite some initial misgivings. The same review praised the complex plot, as well as Stewart's worldbuilding. Despite being a fantasy novel, Carroll noted that Stewart examines themes of personhood and sentience which are more common in science fiction. This is seen in the fact that two major characters are constructs, rather than natural-born humans. Carroll's review concluded that the final book in the trilogy "sticks the landing".
