= Grave Empire =

2025 novel by Richard Swan

- Author: Richard Swan
- Series: Empire of the Wolf
- Publisher: Orbit Books
- Publication date: 2025
- Preceded by: The Trials of Empire

Grave Empire is a 2025 fantasy novel by Richard Swan. It takes place in the fictional setting of the Empire of the Wolf trilogy, and takes place 200 years after the events of the trilogy.

== Synopsis ==
The novel takes place in the fictional setting of the Sovan Empire, which had become a republic 200 years prior before reverting back to imperial rule. Magic has been outlawed in Sova, leaving their society at a disadvantage when dealing with their enemies. The empire is at war with the neighboring states of Casimir and Sanque. A young diplomat named Renata Rainer must investigate reports from a cult of necromancers, who believe that a prophesied apocalypse called "The Great Silence" is approaching. Renata seeks out the mer-men in the hopes that they can provide magical assistance. At the same time, Peter Kleist, a Sovan army lieutenant from a noble family, is stationed at a frontier fort on the borders of Casimir and Sanque, where supernatural enemies are massacring Sovan soldiers. Von Oldenburg, a nobleman obsessed with occult knowledge, studies a madness-inducing plague that he plans to use as a weapon.

== Reception ==
The novel received a starred review from Publishers Weekly and Kirkus Reviews. Publishers Weekly wrote that Swan's detailed worldbuilding, complex character and prose were high points of the novel, while noting that the book was accessible to readers who had no familiarity with the Empire of the Wolf trilogy. Kirkus Reviews wrote that the book felt like a natural continuation of the original trilogy, without being overly derivative of previous entries. Ariana Weldon of SFF Insiders praised the book's worldbuilding and characters, while noting the incorporation of horror elements.

Grimdark Magazine included the book in its list of the best fantasy novels of 2025.
