= Richard Swan (disambiguation) =

Richard Swan (1933–2025) was an American mathematician.

Richard Swan may also refer to.

- Richard Swan (cricketer) (born 1951), Scottish cricketer
- Richard Swan (author), English author
- Richard Swan (MP), 15th-century English member of parliament, see Kingston upon Hull
