= The Bone Shard Emperor =

2021 fantasy novel by Andrea Stewart

- Author: Andrea Stewart
- Language: English
- Series: The Drowning Empire
- Release number: 2
- Genre: Fantasy
- Publisher: Orbit Books
- Publication date: 23 Nov 2021
- Publication place: United States
- Pages: 560 (Hardcover)
- ISBN: 9780316541503
- Preceded by: The Bone Shard Daughter
- Followed by: The Bone Shard War

The Bone Shard Emperor is a 2021 fantasy novel by Andrea Stewart. It is the second entry in the Drowning Empire trilogy, following The Bone Shard Daughter (2020) and preceding The Bone Shard War (2023). The novel continues the story of Lin Sukai and her quest to protect the Empire while maintaining her fragile grasp on the throne.

== Plot ==
Lin, now Emperor, has outlawed the Tithing Festival and the use of constructs. She finds a white-bladed sword among her father's possessions. Unbeknownst to Lin, Jovis continue to spy for the Shardless Few; Gio orders Jovis to steal the sword. Jovis and Lin learn that their bonds to Mephi and Thrana have made them Alanga, giving them the power to cause earthquakes and manipulate water.

Meanwhile, Nisong raises an army of constructs and prepares for war against the Empire. Lin attempts to raise an army to fight Nisong. She discusses politics with several island governors, but many governors refuse to support her rule.

On Nephilanu Island, Phalue and Ranami rescue an orphan named Ayesh. Phalue agrees to work with Gio to overthrow the Sukai Dynasty and establish an elected council of rulers. Lin and Jovis arrive on Nephilanu. Jovis goes to the Shardless Few hideout; in a hidden room, he finds another sword with a white blade. He confronts Gio, professing his loyalty to Lin instead of the Shardless Few. Meanwhile, Phalue and Ranami ask Lin to abdicate. Lin refuses and returns to Imperial Island.

Lin reads her father’s notes, learning that the islands have been kept afloat by veins of witstone. This substance has been mined for decades to produce fuel for ships; its removal has resulted in the sinking of several islands. She orders a halt to all mining, which damages the economy and raises unrest.

A monk named Ragan pledges his service to Lin. Ragan is also an Alanga. He calls Thrana an ossalen and reveals some of the Alangas’ history, which has been preserved by his monastery. Jovis discovers the document proving that Lin Sukai died at the age of three; he realizes that the Emperor is not who she seems.

Kaphra, head of the Ioph Carn, also asks Jovis to steal Lin’s sword. Jovis swaps his sword for Lin’s, intending to give Lin’s sword to Kaphra. Kaphra attempts to kidnap Mephi and Jovis. Lin saves them, but Kaphra escapes with the sword. Jovis learns that the sword is designed to kill Alanga. Lin kisses Jovis, but they both decline to pursue a further relationship.

Lin’s forces arrive on Gaelung Island, which is being attacked by Nisong. Nisong has been taking shards from villagers and using corpses to create new constructs. Lin confesses to Jovis that she is a replica. Jovis realizes that his dead wife’s eyes were used to create Lin. Lin discovers that Jovis spied on her for the Shardless Few; she tells him to leave the island or be executed. Jovis leaves, but discovers that Ragan is a traitor. He returns to inform Lin.

Nisong’s forces, including a construct in the form of a sea serpent, attack. Despite their differences, Phalue and Gio both send troops to fight alongside Lin. Ragan betrays Lin, hoping to convince her to abandon the Empire and rule as an Alanga. Lin defeats Ragan with bone shard magic. Gio reveals himself as an Alanga, turning the tide of the battle. He vows to continue his campaign against the Sukai Dynasty. Nisong escapes and follows after Ragan. Lin consolidates her grip on power, preparing for a war against the Shardless Few.

In an epilogue, Ranami discovers that Ayesh has bonded with an ossalen named Shark.

== Reception and awards ==
Publishers Weekly called the book "heart-pounding", noting that it continues the story of Lin Sukai and her allies with a fast pace, multiple plots, and engrossing scenes of battle. The review concluded that this "page-turning installment is sure to please series fans."

Booklist called the book "compelling and suspenseful," praising the worldbuilding and political negotiations. The review stated that "Stewart's elegant planning and unspooling revelations will keep readers hooked from the first page".

Jodie Crump of Grimdark Magazine praised the multiple points of view and the ways in which the characters interact. Crump felt that Lin's story was more enjoyable than in the first novel, praising the character's combination of vulnerability and determination. Crump stated that Jovis's story arc was her favorite, commenting on his complicated relationship with Lin. The review concluded that Stewart "has come into her own, her writing skillful and confident."
