= Frances Hardinge =

British writer (born 1973)

Frances Hardinge FRSL
- Born: 1973 (age 52–53); Brighton, East Sussex, England
- Occupation: Novelist
- Writing career
- Genre: Young adult fiction
- Notable works: Fly By Night; Cuckoo Song; The Lie Tree
- Notable awards: Branford Boase Award 2006 Fly By Night; Robert Holdstock Award 2015 Cuckoo Song; Costa Book Awards 2015 The Lie Tree
- Website: www.franceshardinge.com

Frances Hardinge (born 1973) is a British children's writer. Her debut novel, Fly by Night, won the 2006 Branford Boase Award and was listed as one of the School Library Journal Best Books. She has also been shortlisted for and received a number of other awards for her novels and short stories.

== Early life and education ==
Hardinge was born in 1973 in Brighton, England, and dreamed of writing at the age of four. She studied English at Somerville College, Oxford and was the founder member of a writers' workshop there.

== Career ==
Her writing career started after she won a short story magazine competition. Shortly after winning she wrote her debut novel, Fly by Night, in her spare time and showed it to Macmillan Publishers after pressure from a friend. It was published in 2005, and was listed as one of the School Library Journal Best Books and won the Branford Boase Award. Her 2015 novel The Lie Tree won the 2015 Costa Book Award Book of the Year, the only children's book to do so besides Philip Pullman's The Amber Spyglass in 2001.

Hardinge was elected a Fellow of the Royal Society of Literature in 2018.

== Personal life ==
Hardinge is often seen wearing a black hat and enjoys dressing in old-fashioned clothing.

== Awards and honours ==
Year	Title	Award	Category	Result	Ref
2006	Fly by Night	Branford Boase Award	—	Won	
2011	Twilight Robbery	Guardian Children's Fiction Prize	—	Shortlisted	
2012	A Face Like Glass	Kitschies	Red Tentacle	Shortlisted	
2015	Cuckoo Song	British Fantasy Award	Robert Holdstock Award	Won	
2015	Cuckoo Song	Carnegie Medal	—	Shortlisted	
2015	The Lie Tree	Costa Book Awards	Book of the Year	Won	
2015	The Lie Tree	Costa Book Awards	Children's	Won	
2016	The Lie Tree	Boston Globe–Horn Book Award	Fiction	Won	
2016	The Lie Tree	Carnegie Medal	—	Shortlisted	
2021	The Lie Tree	Honkaku Mystery of the Decade	Translated Honkaku Mystery of the Decade – 2010s	Shortlisted	

== Works ==
=== Novels ===
- Fly by Night (2005)
- Verdigris Deep (2007); US title, Well Witched
- Gullstruck Island (2009); US title, The Lost Conspiracy
- Twilight Robbery (2011); US title, Fly Trap – sequel to Fly by Night
- A Face Like Glass (2012)
- Cuckoo Song (2014)
- The Lie Tree (2015)
- A Skinful of Shadows (September 2017)
- Deeplight (October 2019)
- Unraveller (September 2022)
- Traitors' Nest (August 2026]]

=== Short fiction ===
Hardinge has written several short stories published in magazines and anthologies, as well as two that were published as standalone books.

- "Shining Man", The Dream Zone 8 (Jan 2001)
- "Communion", Wordplay 1 (Spring 2002)
- "Captive Audience", Piffle 7 (Oct 2002)
- "Bengal Rose", Scribble 20 (Spring 2003)
- "Black Grass", All Hallows 43 (Summer 2007)
- "Halfway House", Alchemy 3 (Jan 2006)
- "Behind The Mirror", serialised in First News (2007)
- "Payment Due", in Under My Hat: Tales from the Cauldron, ed. Jonathan Strahan (Random House, 2012)
- "Flawless", in Twisted Winter, ed. Catherine Butler (Black, 2013)
- "Hayfever", Subterranean, Winter 2014 (Dec 2013)
- "Blind Eye", The Outcast Hours, ed. Mahvesh Murad and Jared Shurin (Solaris, 2019)
- "God's Eye", in Mystery & Mayhem, (Egmont Publishing, 2016)
- Island of Whispers (2023); illustrated by Emily Gravett
- The Forest of a Thousand Eyes (2024); illustrated by Emily Gravett
