= Jen Williams =

British fantasy writer

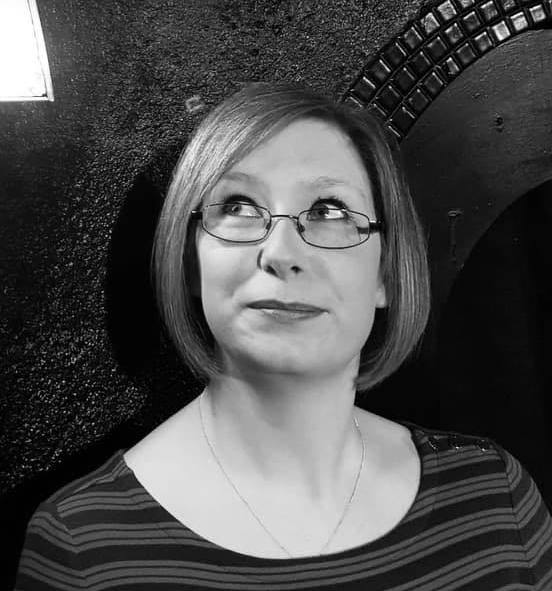
- Born: Jennifer Williams
- Occupations: Novelist, short story writer
- Years active: 2014–present
- Notable work: The Copper Promise series
- Awards: British Fantasy Award for Best Fantasy Novel (2018, 2019)

Jennifer "Jen" Williams is a British fantasy novelist and short story writer.

== Biography ==
Jennifer Williams is a writer originally from London who now lives in Bristol. Williams and Den Patrick began a monthly social group for fantasy fans called the Super Relaxed Fantasy Club. Her first three books were nominated for British Fantasy Awards in 2015, 2016 and 2017 respectively and she won the award for Best Fantasy Novel in 2018 and 2019.

Williams published her first crime novel in 2021. Her thriller The Hungry Dark was released in April 2024 and was published by Crooked Lane Books. Her fantasy novel Titanchild, the sequel to Talonsister, was published in November 2024 by Titan Books.

The Sleepless is Williams' first young adult romantasy novel, which came out in 2025 through FirstInk.

== Awards ==
Year	Title	Award	Category	Result	Ref
2015	The Copper Promise	British Fantasy Award	Best Newcomer	Nominated	
2016	The Iron Ghost	British Fantasy Award	Best Fantasy Novel	Nominated	
2017	The Silver Tide	British Fantasy Award	Best Fantasy Novel	Nominated	
2018	The Ninth Rain	British Fantasy Award	Best Fantasy Novel	Won	
2018	The Ninth Rain	Subjective Chaos Kind of Awards	Best Blurred Boundary	Won	
2019	The Bitter Twins	British Fantasy Award	Best Fantasy Novel	Won	
2020	The Winnowing Flame	Subjective Chaos Kind of Awards	Best Series	Nominated	
2024	Talon Sister	British Fantasy Award	Best Fantasy Novel	Won	

== Publications ==
=== The Copper Promise series ===
- —— (2014). The Copper Promise. Watkins Media. ISBN 9780857665768.
- —— (2015). Sorrow's Isle. Headline. ISBN 9781472229724.
- —— (2015). The Iron Ghost. Headline. ISBN 9781472211149.
- —— (2016). The Silver Tide. Headline. ISBN 9781472211163.

=== The Winnowing Flame series ===
- —— (2017). The Ninth Rain. Headline. ISBN 9781472235169.
- —— (2018). The Bitter Twins. Headline. ISBN 9781472235190.
- —— (2019). The Poison Song. Headline. ISBN 9781472235220.

=== Talon duology ===
- —— (2023). Talonsister. Titan Books. ISBN 9781803364353.
- —— (2024). Titanchild. Titan Books. ISBN 9781803364384.

=== Sleepless duology ===
- —— (2025). The Sleepless. Wednesday Books.
- —— (2026). The Dreamless. Wednesday Books.

=== Other novels ===
- —— (2021). A Dark and Secret Place. Crooked Lane Books. ISBN 9781643855745. (US)
  - —— (2021). Dog Rose Dirt. HarperCollins. ISBN 9780008383831. (UK)
- —— (2023). Games for Dead Girls. Crooked Lane Books. ISBN 9781643859163.
- ——— (2024). The Hungry Dark. Crooked Lane Books. ISBN 9781639106172.

=== Collections ===
- —— (2012). Her Majesty's Mysterious Conveyance. Echelon Press. ISBN 9781590808597.

=== Short fiction ===
- "London Stone" (2009)
- "Constance Withers and the Wall" (2016)
