= The Copper Promise =

Fantasy series

- Cover of the 2014 Headline paperback edition
- Ghosts of the Citadel (2013); Children of the Fog (2014); Prince of Wounds (2014); Upon the Ashen Blade (2014)
- Author: Jen Williams
- Country: United States
- Language: English
- Genre: Fantasy
- Publisher: Headline
- Published: 2013 - 2014
- Media type: Print, e-book
- No. of books: 4
- Followed by: The Iron Ghost

The Copper Promise is a 2013 fantasy novella series by Jen Williams and her debut work. It was initially released between December 2013 and January 2014 as a set of four e-book novellas and has since been published in paperback format as a single volume through Headline (ISBN 978-1472211118).

== Plot ==
The story concerns the deposed Lord Frith's search for vengeance against the killers of his family. In the process, he employs the services of two mercenaries, Sebastian and Wydrin. Their actions in the early part of the story result in the release of a dragon god and an unstoppable army, and much of the subsequent narrative covers their attempts to make amends for this disaster.

== Books ==
1. Ghosts of the Citadel (20 December 2013)
2. Children of the Fog (2 January 2014)
3. Prince of Wounds (16 January 2014)
4. Upon the Ashen Blade (30 January 2014)

== Reception ==
Critical reception for The Copper Promise has been predominantly positive. SciFiNow praised the work as being "a gripping, fast-paced adventure that’s a must-read" with "realistically flawed characters", and the British Fantasy Society also cited the characters as one of the highlights of the work. Sfcrowsnest also gave the book a favorable review, as they appreciated that the book did not have "one of those sickening cliff-hangers at the end" and that it was "better than the average fantasy novel out there on the market."
