= Twilight Robbery =

2011 novel by Frances Hardinge

- First edition (UK)
- Author: Frances Hardinge
- Illustrator: Tomislav Tomic
- Cover artist: James Fraser
- Language: English
- Series: Mosca Mye novels
- Genre: Children's or young adult fiction, fantasy novel
- Publisher: UK: Macmillan; US: HarperCollins
- Publication date: 4 March 2011
- Publication place: United Kingdom
- Media type: Print (hardback & paperback)
- Pages: 544 pp (first edition hardcover)
- ISBN: 978-0-330-44192-6
- OCLC: 1062192796
- Preceded by: Fly by Night

Twilight Robbery is a children's or young adults' comic fantasy novel by Frances Hardinge, published on 4 March 2011 by Macmillan in the UK, and, under the name Fly Trap, by HarperCollins in the US. It was shortlisted for the 2011 Guardian Children's Fiction Prize. It is the sequel to Fly by Night, featuring the same protagonist Mosca Mye. It is set in the same grotesque fantasy world of The Realm, which Hardinge describes as bearing some similarity to early 18th-century England. The people follow the cult of numerous small deities, known as the Beloved, each sacred in just a few hours in the year. Everyone is named according to the Beloved in whose time they are born.

The novel is mostly located in the town of Toll, which has the only surviving bridge over the Langfeather gorge. Toll's unique character comes from its division into Toll-by-Day and Toll-by-Night, the two towns time-sharing the same physical space. Residents are assigned to day or night according to their name, aligned to the Beloved they are born under, and must wear a badge showing their classification. Twice a day, at dawn and dusk, the bugle sounds for the 15 minute day/night changeover. The Jinglers lock one population into their sleeping quarters, and then release the other. Doors and trade-signs, even the street pattern, are reorganised at the changeover by use of moving panels.

Toll charges a steep entry toll and separate exit toll, only affordable by the well-off. Exit from Toll-by-Night is twice the day charge. Visitors who pay for entry may stay three days in Toll-by-Day, regardless of their name. If they do not pay for exit, they become residents, and must live in Toll-by-Day or Toll-by-Night according to their name.

Toll has been stable through the political upheavals in the Realm, and its bridge has survived. Most dayfolk superstitiously believe that a charm called the Luck, held in a room at the top of the Clock Tower, keeps them safe. Frances Hardinge based this idea on a number of British places which have legends of a Luck, an object whose loss or breakage would presage disaster.

== Synopsis ==
At the end of Fly By Night, Mosca and her goose have left the city of Mandelion for life on the road with conman Eponymous Clent. At the beginning of Twilight Robbery, winter is approaching and Clent is locked in a debtors' prison in Grabely. Skellow, a criminal, abducts Mosca for her writing skills. She assists him buy the services of the Romantic Facilitator to force a marriage on a maiden of Toll.

Mosca escapes, and reunited with Clent and her goose Saracen, arrives in Toll to try to take advantage of what she knows about Skellow's plot. This leads to a series of increasingly dangerous adventures for Mosca, crossing the boundary between Toll-by-Day and Toll-by-Night, and impinging on the high politics of the Realm. Mosca's decisions have momentous consequences.

== Characters ==
- Mosca Mye – our hero, a 12-yr-old dark-eyed orphan, book-lover, and accomplished liar
- Saracen – her pet goose of violent inclination
- Eponymous Clent – travelling wordsmith and conman, who has formed a working partnership with Mosca
- Jennifer Bessel – businesswoman friend of Clent, who wears gloves to conceal her thief brand
- Graywing Marlebourne – mayor of Toll, but his power mainly runs to control Toll-by-Day
- Thrope Foely – the Night Steward, the Mayor's official representative in Toll-by-Night
- Aramai Goshawk – senior agent of the Locksmiths, the effective power in Toll-by-Night
- Beamabeth Marlebourne – 16-yr-old adopted daughter of the Mayor, darling of the people and chocolate lover
- Appleton Brand – ex-suitor of Beamabeth, discredited for radicalism his name has been reclassified as nightling
- Sir Feldroll of Millepoyse –Beamabeth's new suitor, governor of the major city of Waymakem
- Rabilan Skellow – a shady character who abducts Mosca to write bids at a Pawnbrokers’ auction
- The Romantic Facilitator – mysterious criminal who offers assistance with forced marriages
- Leveretia Leap – a nightling midwife, who attended Beamabeth's birth
- Laylow – a nightling chocolate smuggler, who wears metal claws on one hand
- Quince – a musician, whose band somehow includes both dayfolk and nightlings
- Paragon Mollycoddle – a pale boy confined to the Clock Tower through no fault of his own

== Factions ==
- Toll dayfolk – residents of Toll-by-Day, superstitious believers in the protective power of the Luck. They are afraid of the nightlings who they perceive as dirty and dangerous.
- Toll nightlings – residents of Toll-by-Night, made to do the dirty jobs that keep Toll-by-Day clean and running smoothly. Poverty means many nightlings turn to crime to get by. Thieves' cant is widely spoken.
- Guild of Locksmiths – known as the Jinglers in Toll. Once they only made locks and strongboxes, but now operate as a mafia providing a wider range of security services. A Locksmith always wears gloves as the outline of a key is branded on his right palm. The head of each cell wears a chatelaine at his waist which match the brands of all the men that answer to him.
- Guild of Pawnbrokers – have expanded from money-lending into fencing stolen property and facilitating other criminal transactions
- Radicals – believers in freedom of speech and religion, who have taken power in Mandelion
- Aristocrats – rulers of most of the city states of the Realm, who desire to contain the spread of radicalism. They have cut off trade with Mandelion, and are contemplating sending an army to overturn the regime.
