= Sofia Samatar =

American educator, poet and writer (born 1971)

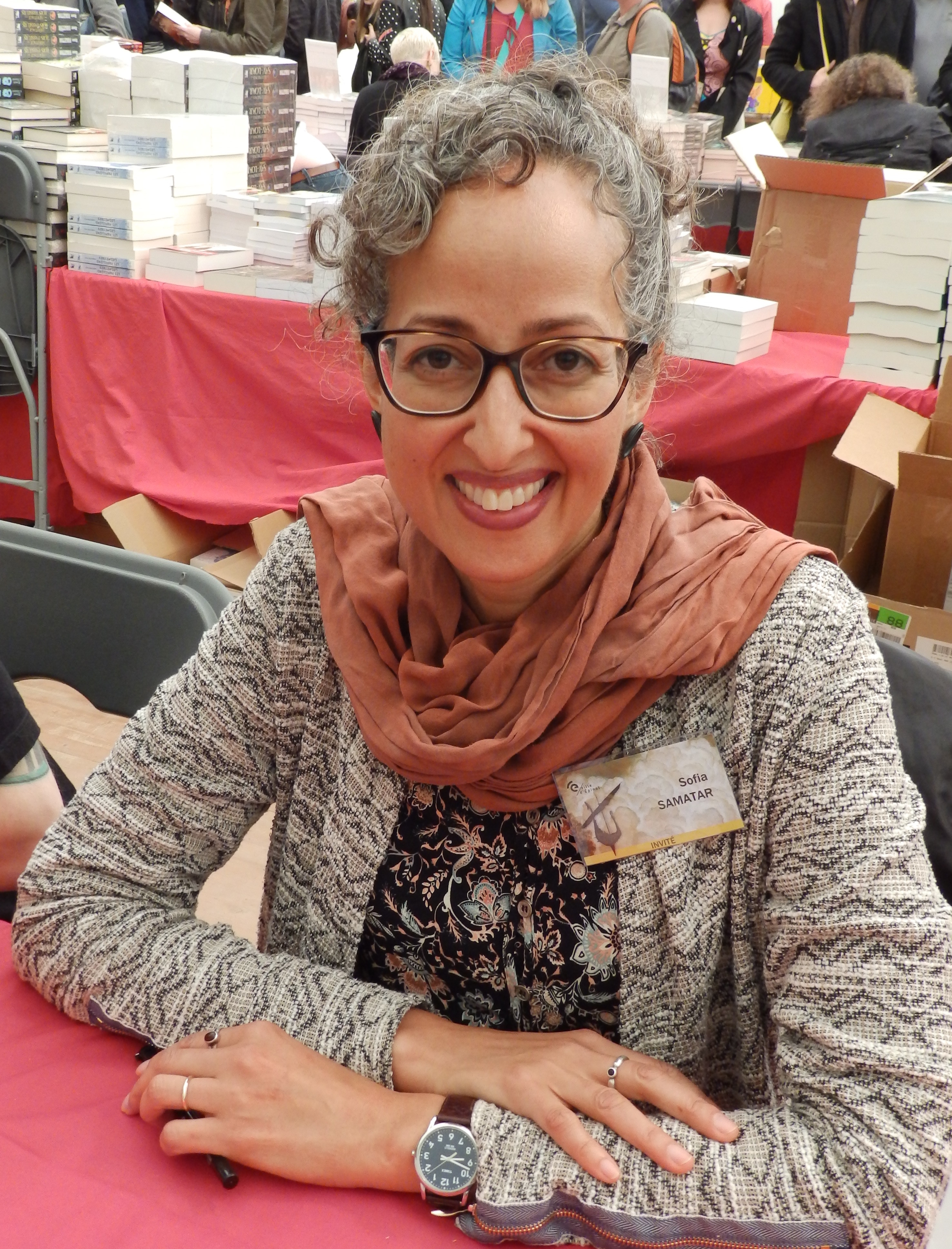
- Born: 24 October 1971 (age 54); Indiana, United States
- Education: Goshen College, University of Wisconsin-Madison
- Occupations: Professor; editor; poet; writer
- Spouse: Keith Miller
- Children: 2
- Parent: Said Sheikh Samatar (father)
- Writing career
- Genres: Fantasy, mythology, postmodernism
- Notable works: A Stranger in Olondria (2013), The White Mosque (2022)
- Notable awards: British Fantasy Award, World Fantasy Award, John W. Campbell Award, Crawford Award
- Website: sofiasamatar.com

Sofia Samatar (Somali: Sofia Samatar; Arabic: صوفيا ساماتار) is an American scholar, novelist and educator from Indiana. She is an associate professor of English at James Madison University.

== Early life ==
Samatar was born in northern Indiana, United States. Her father was the Somali scholar, historian and writer Said Sheikh Samatar. Her mother is a Swiss-German Mennonite from North Dakota. Sofia's parents met in 1970 in Mogadishu, Somalia, while her mother was teaching English.

Samatar attended a Mennonite high school before studying at Goshen College in Goshen, Indiana, where she graduated with a Bachelor of Arts in English. In 1997, Samatar earned a master's degree in African languages and literature from the University of Wisconsin–Madison in Madison, Wisconsin and a Ph.D. in 2013 in contemporary Arabic literature.

== Career ==
Samatar is an associate professor of English at James Madison University. Her main literary influences include Ernest Hemingway, James Joyce, Virginia Woolf, William Faulkner, and Rainer Maria Rilke, as well as Somali mythology. Samatar served as a nonfiction and poetry editor for Interfictions: A Journal of Interstitial Arts.

Samatar's first novel A Stranger in Olondria was published in 2013 by Small Beer Press. It was followed by a companion novel, The Winged Histories, in 2016.

Samatar has published qasīdas in English. She collaborated with her brother on a book of illustrated prose poems, entitled Monster Portraits, which was published in 2018 by Rose Metal Press.

In 2022, she published her first nonfiction book, The White Mosque, a memoir about a trip to Uzbekistan in search of the followers of fringe religious leader Claas Epp Jr.

== Awards ==
| Year | Work | Award | Category | Result | Ref. |
|---|---|---|---|---|---|
| 2013 | "Selkie Stories Are for Losers" | BSFA Award | Short Fiction | Shortlisted | |
| 2013 | "Selkie Stories Are for Losers" | Nebula Award | Short Story | Nominated | |
| 2013 | A Stranger in Olondria | Nebula Award | Novel | Nominated | |
| 2014 | —N/a | John W. Campbell Award for Best New Writer (Note: Now known as the Astounding Award) | — | Won | |
| 2014 | "APACHE CHIEF" | Rhysling Award | Short Poetry | Nominated | |
| 2014 | "Selkie Stories Are for Losers" | Hugo Award | Short Story | Finalist | |
| 2014 | "Selkie Stories Are for Losers" | World Fantasy Award | Short Fiction | Nominated | |
| 2014 | A Stranger in Olondria | British Fantasy Award | Fantasy Novel | Won | |
| 2014 | A Stranger in Olondria | Crawford Award | — | Won | |
| 2014 | A Stranger in Olondria | Locus Award | First Novel | Finalist | |
| 2014 | A Stranger in Olondria | World Fantasy Award | Novel | Won | |
| 2015 | "Ogres of East Africa" | Locus Award | Short Story | Finalist | |
| 2017 | The Winged Histories | Locus Award | Fantasy Novel | Finalist | |
| 2018 | Tender | British Fantasy Award | Collection | Shortlisted | |
| 2018 | Tender | Locus Award | Collection | Finalist | |
| 2018 | Tender | World Fantasy Award | Collection | Nominated | |
| 2021 | "Fairy Tales for Robots" | Locus Award | Novelette | Finalist | |
| 2023 | The White Mosque | PEN/Jean Stein Book Award | — | Finalist | |
| 2024 | The Practice, the Horizon, and the Chain | Nebula Award | Novella | Nominated | |
| 2025 | The Practice, the Horizon, and the Chain | Hugo Award | Novella | Finalist | |
| 2025 | The Practice, the Horizon, and the Chain | Ignyte Award | Novella | Finalist | |
| 2025 | The Practice, the Horizon, and the Chain | Locus Award | Locus Award for Best Novella | Finalist | |
| 2025 | The Practice, the Horizon, and the Chain | Philip K. Dick Award | — | Finalist | |

== Personal ==
Samatar is married to American writer Keith R. Miller. They have two children. Although her father is a Somali Muslim, she is a Mennonite like her mother.

== Bibliography ==
Novels

- — (30 Apr 2013). A Stranger in Olondria. Small Beer Press. ISBN 9781618730626.
- — (1 Mar 2016). The Winged Histories. Small Beer Press. ISBN 9781618731142.

Novellas

- — (16 Apr 2024). The Practice, the Horizon, and the Chain. Tordotcom. ISBN 9781250881809.

Nonfiction

- — (25 Oct 2022). The White Mosque: A Memoir. Catapult. ISBN 9781646220984.
- Samatar, Sofia; Zambreno, Kate (21 Nov 2023). Tone. Columbia University Press. ISBN 9780231558792.
- — (13 Aug 2024). Opacities: On Writing and the Writing Life. Soft Skull Press. ISBN 9781593767662.
- — (10 Nov 2025). Friendly City: A Year of Walks. Quinx Books. ISBN 9781680600056.

Collections

- — (18 Apr 2017). Tender. Small Beer Press. ISBN 9781618731265.
- Samatar, Del; Samatar, Sofia (22 Feb 2018). Monster Portraits. Rose Metal Press. ISBN 9781941628102.

Short fiction

- — (2012). "The Nazir". Ideomancer.
  - Reprinted: — (19 Nov 2015). "The Nazir". In Matheson, Michael (ed.). The Humanity of Monsters. ChiZine Publications. ISBN 9781771483599.
- — (Aug 2012). "A Brief History of Nonduality Studies". Expanded Horizons. No. 36.
  - Reprinted: — (1 Oct 2013). "A Brief History of Nonduality Studies". In Campbell, Bill; Hall, Edward Austin (eds.). Mothership: Tales from Afrofuturism and Beyond. Rosarium Publishing. ISBN 9780989141147.
  - Reprinted: — (15 Jan 2015). "A Brief History of Nonduality Studies". Jalada 02: AfroFuture(s). Jalada Collective. ASIN B0DM2C5R1G.
- — (Aug 2012). "Honey Bear". Clarkesworld Magazine. No. 71.
- — (7 Jan 2013). "Selkie Stories Are for Losers". Strange Horizons. Full text online.
  - Reprinted: — (8 May 2014). "Selkie Stories Are for Losers". In Strahan, Jonathan (ed.). The Best Science Fiction and Fantasy of the Year. Vol. 8. Solaris Books. ISBN 9781781082157.
  - Reprinted: — (4 Feb 2015). "Selkie Stories Are for Losers". In Rios, Julia; Krasnostein, Alisa (eds.). Year's Best Young Adult Speculative Fiction 2013. Kaleidoscope Publishing. ISBN 9781922101273.
  - Reprinted: — (22 Aug 2017). "Selkie Stories Are for Losers". In Beagle, Peter S.; Weisman, Jacob (eds.). The New Voices of Fantasy. Tachyon Publications. ISBN 9781616962579.
  - Reprinted: — (23 Feb 2021). "Selkie Stories Are for Losers". In Bacchilega, Cristina; Orme, Jennifer (eds.). Inviting Interruptions: Wonder Tales in the Twenty-First Century. Wayne State University Press. ISBN 9780814347003.
- — (2 Apr 2013). "Dawn and the Maiden". Apex Magazine. No. 47.
- — (1 Aug 2013). "I Stole the D.C.'s Eyeglass". In Fernandes, Fabio; al-Ayad, Djibril (eds.). We See a Different Frontier: A Postcolonial Speculative Fiction Anthology. Futurefire.net. ISBN 9780957397521.
  - Reprinted: — (7 Oct 2014). "I Stole the D.C.'s Eyeglass". In Wallace, Sean (ed.). The Mammoth Book of Steampunk Adventures. Running Press. ISBN 9780762454648.
- — (27 Aug 2013). "Bess, the Landlord's Daughter, Goes for Drinks with the Green Girl". In Klima, John; Thomas, Lynn M.; Thomas, Michael Damian (eds.). Glitter & Mayhem. Apex Book Company. ISBN 9781937009199.
- — (1 Sep 2013). Behm-Steinberg, Hugh (ed.). "How I Met the Ghoul". Eleven Eleven. California College of the Arts.
  - Reprinted: — (15 Oct 2015). "How I Met the Ghoul". In Datlow, Ellen (ed.). The Monstrous. Tachyon Publications. ISBN 9781616962067.
- — (1 Oct 2013). Memmott, David; What, Leslie; Schumacher, Matt (eds.). "Olimpia's Ghost". Phantom Drift. 3: Rewiring the Weird. Phantom Drift Limited. ISBN 9781877655814.
  - Reprinted: — (9 Oct 2014). "Olimpia's Ghost". In Barron, Laird (ed.). Year's Best Weird Fiction Volume 1. ChiZine Publications. ISBN 9780981317755.
- — (30 Jan 2014). "Ogres of East Africa". In Fox, Rose; Older, Daniel José (eds.). Long Hidden: Speculative Fiction from the Margins of History. Crossed Genres Publications. ISBN 9780991392100.
- — (Mar 2014). "How to Get Back to the Forest". Lightspeed. No. 46.
  - Reprinted: — (9 Jun 2015). "How to Get Back to the Forest". In Horton, Rich (ed.). The Year's Best Science Fiction & Fantasy 2015. Prime Books. ISBN 9781607014522.
  - Reprinted: — (6 Oct 2015). "How to Get Back to the Forest". In Hill, Joe; Adams, John Joseph (eds.). The Best American Science Fiction and Fantasy 2015. Houghton Mifflin Harcourt. ISBN 9780544449848.
- — (Spring 2014). "A Girl Who Comes Out of a Chamber at Regular Intervals". Lackington's. No. 2. Illustrated by Galen Dara.
- — (5 Aug 2014). "Walkdog". In Krasnostein, Alisa; Rios, Julia (eds.). Kaleidoscope: Diverse YA Science Fiction and Fantasy Stories. Twelfth Planet Press. ISBN 9781922101112.
  - Reprinted: — (21 Jan 2016). "Walkdog". In Rios, Julia; Krasnostein, Alisa (eds.). Year's Best YA Speculative Fiction 2014. Twelfth Planet Press. ISBN 9781922101358.
- — (3 Mar 2015). "Those". Uncanny Magazine. No. 3.
  - Reprinted: — (19 Jul 2016). "Those". In Guran, Paula (ed.). The Year's Best Dark Fantasy & Horror 2016. Prime Books. ISBN 9781607014713.
- — (Jul 2015). DeLuca, Michael J. (ed.). "Request for an Extension on the Clarity". Lady Churchill's Rosebud Wristlet. No. 33. Small Beer Press.
- — (Aug 2015). "Tender". OmniVerse.
- — (Sep 2015). White, Brian J. (ed.). "The Closest Thing to Animals". Fireside Fiction. Illustrated by Galen Dara.
- — (Nov 2015). "Meet Me in Iram". Guillotine. No. 10.
  - Reprinted: — (4 Oct 2016). "Meet Me in Iram". In Fowler, Karen Joy; Adams, John Joseph (eds.). The Best American Science Fiction And Fantasy 2016. Mariner Books. ISBN 9780544555204.
- — (2016). "His Hollow". Obsidian: Literature and Arts in the African Diaspora. Vol. 42, no. 1.
- — (22 Mar 2016). "Cities of Emerald, Deserts of Gold". The Revelator. Vol. 139, no. 1.
- — (Jun 2016). "The Red Thread". Lightspeed. No. 73.
  - Reprinted: — (4 Jun 2019). "The Red Thread". In Adams, John Joseph (ed.). Wastelands: The New Apocalypse. Titan Books. ISBN 9781785658952.
- — (3 Apr 2017). "An Account of the Land of Witches". The Offing.
  - Reprinted: — (6 Nov 2018). "An Account of the Land of Witches". Uncanny Magazine. No. 25.
- — (1 Mar 2018). "The Adventures of Ja'far al-Barmaki". Galli Books.
- — (Sep 2018). "Hard Mary". Lightspeed. No. 100.
- — (Fall 2019). "Wolf Tones". Conjunctions. No. 73.
- — (6 Dec 2019). "Reflections". In Christensen, Laura (ed.). THEN AGAIN: Vintage Photography Reimagined by One Artist and Thirty-One Writers. ISBN 9780989790079.
- — (17 Mar 2020). "Fairy Tales for Robots". In Strahan, Jonathan (ed.). Made to Order: Robots and Revolution. Solaris Books. ISBN 9781781087879.
- Samatar, Del; Samatar, Sofia (Spring 2020). "The Moon Fairy". Conjunctions. No. 74.
- — (28 Jan 2021). "The New Book of the Dead". In De Cruz, Helen; De Smedt, Johan; Schwitzgebel, Eric (eds.). Philosophy through Science Fiction Stories: Exploring the Boundaries of the Possible. Bloomsbury Academic. ISBN 9781350081222.
- — (Fall 2022). "Readings in the Slantwise Sciences". Conjunctions. No. 79.
- — (6 Mar 2023). "Contact Light". In Thompson, John WM (ed.). Mooncalves: Strange Stories. NO Press. ISBN 9798985254518.
- — (31 Jan 2024). "Sunday Night with Generational Distress". Sleepingfish XX. Calamari Press. ISBN 9781940853208.
- — (26 Jun 2026). "Mirror, Mirror". Future Tense Fiction. Issues in Science and Technology.

Poetry

- — (Sep 2011). "The Sand Diviner". Stone Telling. No. 5.
- — (Dec 2011). "Girl Hours". Stone Telling. No. 6.
- — (Winter 2012). "Qasida of the Ferryman". Goblin Fruit.
- — (15 Apr 2012). "The Year of Disasters". Bull Spec. No. 7.
  - Reprinted: — (May 2012). "The Year of Disasters". In Lemberg, R. B. (ed.). The Moment of Change: An Anthology of Feminist Speculative Poetry. Aqueduct Press. ISBN 9781619760066.
- — (Summer 2012). "Burnt Lyric". Goblin Fruit.
- — (23 Jul 2012). "Lost Letter". Strange Horizons.
- — (Aug 2012). "The Hunchback's Mother". inkscrawl. No. 4.
- — (Aug 2012). "Snowbound in Hamadan". Stone Telling. No. 8.
- — (Sep 2012). "Shahrazad Spoils the Coffee". Jabberwocky. No. 14.
- — (7 May 2013). "Persephone Set Free". Mythic Delirium. No. 28.
- — (Jun 2013). "Undoomed". Ideomancer.
- — (8 Aug 2013). "APACHE CHIEF". In Lipkin, Shira; Thomas, Michael Damian (eds.). Flying Higher: An Anthology of Superhero Poetry. Meatball Trouble Productions. ISBN 9781301859054.
- — (Jan 2014). "Long-Ear". Stone Telling. No. 10.
- — (13 Apr 2014). Gorinsky, Liz (ed.). "The Death of Araweilo". Reactor.
- — (Autumn 2014). "Make the Night Go Faster". Liminality. No. 1.
- — (Jan 2015). "The White Goddess". Bluestockings Magazine.
- — (Summer 2015). "A Visit with Morgan le Fay". Liminality. No. 4.
- — (Jul 2015). "The Noble Torturer". Bluestockings Magazine.
