= A Face Like Glass =

2012 fantasy adventure novel by Frances Hardinge

- Author: Frances Hardinge
- Cover artist: James Fraser
- Genre: Adventure fantasy
- Published: 8 May 2012
- Publisher: Macmillan
- Publication place: UK
- Pages: 488
- Awards: Nominated for the 2013 Kitschies
- ISBN: 9780230763500

A Face Like Glass is a 2012 fantasy adventure novel by Frances Hardinge. It is the 5th novel by Hardinge and was short-listed for the 2013 Kitschies award.

== Synopsis ==
In the underground city of Caverna, craftsmen are able to create items with magical properties, such as cheese that gives you visions of the future, a wine that can remove or restore memory, or perfumes that can control the thoughts of whoever detects it. Citizens born in Caverna have no problems feeling emotions but lack the ability to display them on their faces, and must be taught each expression by craftsmen known as facesmiths. The book follows Neverfell, the apprentice and adopted daughter of the cheesemaker Grandible, as she becomes entangled in a net of conspiracies and betrayal. Neverfell is not like the other inhabitants of Caverna, for her face shows exactly what she is feeling and thinking, being unable to lie in a world where everything is built on lies.

== Main characters ==
- Neverfell – the protagonist, a 12-year-old girl working in a cheese cellar and forced to wear a mask to hide the fact that she is different
- Grandible – a cheesemaster, found Neverfell as a small child and brings her up as his assistant
- Erstwhile – a delivery boy, a drudge, makes friends with Neverfell
- Madame Appeline – a facesmith, employs young models known as Putty Girls to demonstrate facial expressions
- Zouelle Childersin – an aristocratic girl with an instinct for intrigue
- Maxim Childersin – a leading winemaker, great-uncle and guardian of Zouelle
- The Grand Steward – ruler of Caverna, always awake as he alternates sleep between the two halves of his brain, separately known as Left Eye and Right Eye
- Enquirer Treble – head of the Enquiry, the Grand Steward's security police
- The Kleptomancer – a mysterious criminal who carries out spectacular robberies
- Drudges – labourers imprisoned in the Undercity, have few facial expressions
- Cartographers –experts in the convoluted 3D geography of Caverna, dangerously mad but essential for safe construction work

== Reception ==
A Face Like Glass received positive reviews from critics. The Guardian writes "One of the most joyous aspects of A Face Like Glass is that, from a brilliant premise, Hardinge goes on to weave a richly textured world in which that premise fits naturally, and the reader is able to suspend their disbelief."

NPR writes: "Let me begin by stating that this is a perfect book. [...] It's perfect in the way that excellent clockwork is perfect: intricate, precise, and hiding all its marvels in plain sight."

Kirkus Reviews writes "Hardinge excels at wordplay and worldbuilding; witty but not trite, her utterly original setting and chaotic, fidgety protagonist anchor a cracking good story that raises important ideas surrounding the nature of friendship, the value of honesty, and the danger of too much, whether luxury, ambition, power, or desire."
