= Deeplight =

2019 novel by Frances Hardinge

- Author: Frances Hardinge
- Language: English
- Publisher: Macmillan Children's Books
- Publication date: October 31, 2019
- Pages: 416
- ISBN: 978-1-509-83695-6

Deeplight is a young adult fantasy novel by Frances Hardinge, published October 31, 2019 by Macmillan Children's Books. It is her 9th novel.

== Plot ==
In the fictional island chain of the Myriad, the inhabitants worshiped and revered enormous sea creatures referred to as 'gods' that fed on human fear from a source below the sea known as the Undersea. 30 years before the events of the book, the gods all turned on each other and tore each other apart in a disaster known as the Cataclysm, and the remnants of their bodies are now used as high durability material called 'godware' for various purposes. Our protagonist, Hark, lives on the island Lady's Crave with his best friend Jelt. In an accident involving a stolen bathysphere, Jelt seemingly drowns but comes back to life when a submerged ball of godware reanimates his body and heals his wounds. They decide to use the ball to heal people as a way to pay their debts for stealing the bathysphere. However, Hark soon discovers that prolonged exposure to the ball affects your body in strange ways, and is worried about its effect on Jelt, who never leaves its presence. Discovering that the ball is actually the heart of one of the gods, Hark tries to warn Jelt but is too late, as he is already too far gone, having been molded by the heart into something barely resembling a human. In a clash between the two, Hark steals the heart but is captured by the Leaguers, a group who wish to bring back the age of the gods. They transport the heart to the undersea to awaken their own god-construct, made of godware, but Jelt appears and merges with the heart and the god-construct, empowered by the fear in the undersea. In a final altercation, Hark reconcile that Jelt drowned in the bathysphere accident, being only kept alive since by the power of the god's heart. Hark crushes the heart, killing what was left of Jelt.

== Reception ==
Deeplight has received positive reviews from The Guardian, Readings, Common Sense Media, and Booklist, including starred reviews from Kirkus and Publishers Weekly. The book also received the following accolades:

- British Science Fiction Association Award for Best Artwork Nominee (2019)
- Lodestar Award Nominee (2020)
- American Library Association Best Fiction for Young Adults Top Ten (2021)
