= Unraveled =

Unraveled or Unravelled may refer to:

- Unraveled (film), a 2010 American documentary film
- Unraveled, a 2005 album by Confessor
- Unravelled, a 1994 album by The Comsat Angels
- "Unravelled", a 1997 song by Jan Hellriegel

== See also ==
- Unravel (disambiguation)
- Unraveller (disambiguation)
- Unravelling (disambiguation)
