= A Stranger in Olondria =

2013 fantasy novel by Sofia Samatar

- Author: Sofia Samatar
- Language: English
- Series: Olondria
- Release number: 1
- Genre: Fantasy
- Publisher: Small Beer Press
- Publication date: 12 Apr 2013
- Publication place: United States
- Pages: 300 (1st ed. hardcover)
- Awards: British Fantasy Award for Best Fantasy Novel; Crawford Award; World Fantasy Award-Novel
- ISBN: 9781618730626
- Followed by: The Winged Histories

A Stranger in Olondria: Being the Complete Memoirs of the Mystic, Jevick of Tyom is a 2013 fantasy novel by Sofia Samatar. It tells the story of Jevick, the son of a pepper merchant who travels to the country of Olondria. Jevick encounters the spirit of a dead girl and is pulled into a conflict between two powerful religious groups.

The book is the author's debut novel and was followed by a companion novel, The Winged Histories, in 2016. It received critical acclaim, with critics commenting on its exploration of language, literature, and African traditions. It won the 2014 British Fantasy Award for Best Fantasy Novel, Crawford Award, and World Fantasy Award for Best Novel.

== Plot ==
Jevick is the son of a wealthy pepper farmer. He lives in Tyom, an isolated village in the Tea Islands. Each year, his father visits the far-off land of Olondria to sell his harvest. One year, his father brings Jevick a tutor from Olondria. Master Lunre teaches Jevick the Olondrian language, as well as reading and writing. Jevick grows to love Olondrian literature, as his native Kideti language has no written form..

Jevick's father dies, leaving him to run the family business. Jevick sets sail for Bain, the capital of Olondria. On the journey, he meets a terminally ill young woman named Jissavet. From Jevick, Jissavet learns about reading and writing.

In Bain, Jevick falls in love with the city and its culture. During the Feast of Birds, he joins an ecstatic religious procession devoted to the goddess Avalei. When he awakens, he is visited by the ghost of Jissavet. Over the following days, he sees the ghost often and experiences unexplained symptoms of illness. When he tries to return to Tyom, she makes him sick and prevents his travel. Jevick confesses his supernatural malady to an innkeeper. The next day, he is arrested. He learns that the Priest of Stone, a powerful religious ruler, does not believe in consulting with spirits. Instead, this religious group believes in the power of the written word. Jevick is brought to the Holy City, where he meets the daughter of the priest, Tialon. Jevick is imprisoned in an asylum.

One night, a stranger named Miros enters Jevick's room and brings him before the High Priest of Avalei. This cult maintains an underground presence in the Holy City. The priest offers to retrieve Jissavet's body if Jevick participates in the Night Market, a religious ritual. Jissavet speaks to Jevick. She asks him to write a vallon, or book. She wishes for her words to live forever. She also asks him to retrieve her body and burn it in accordance with their islands' customs. Jevick is reluctant, as he believes himself superior to the illiterate Jessivet.

Tialon reveals that she knows about Jevick's impending escape. Jevick's tutor Lunre was once the best friend of Tialon's father. Lunre left Olondria due to theological differences and a growing attraction to Tialon. She allows Jevick to escape.

Auram, the priest of Avalei, brings Jevick to rural Olondria. The Night Market begins. Villagers ask Jevick for assistance; they believe that those who are possessed by "angels" can provide them with supernatural knowledge. Guards arrive, burning the market and killing numerous attendees. Jevick escapes with an injured Miros. Jevick finally agrees to write Jissavet's book.

Jissavet narrates her life story to Jevick, including several local myths and tales from her childhood. Her father left a life of nobility to marry a poor woman. Jissavet resented her mother for being slow-witted and boring. As a teenager, she contracted her illness and spent several years in poor health. Her father told her that he was not Jissavet's biological father; her mother was kidnapped and raped, resulting in Jissavet's birth. As her condition deteriorates, her family brings her to a sanatorium in Olondria, where she eventually dies. Over the following weeks, Jevick finishes Jissavet's memoir. Auram arrives with Jissavet's bones. Jevick burns the remains, allowing her to pass to the afterlife.

When news of the Night Market massacre reaches Bain, popular opinion turns against the Priest of the Stone. Auram has instigated a civil war in order to return his religion to power. Jevick says farewell to Miros and boards a ship for his homeland.

Back in Tyom, Jevick reunites with his family and Lunre. He re-reads Jissavet's book. He uses her words to develop a written form of his native Kideti language, teaching it to local children.

== Major themes ==
=== Language and literature ===
Amal El-Mohtar noted that the novel explores the use of literature and language. In childhood, Jevick becomes fascinated with Olondrian language and literature. As an adult, he travels to the foreign country, and the novel explores the tension between "Jevick-who-reads and Jevick-who-writes; the Jevick who falls in love with Olondria through its books, and the Jevick writing the story of the Jevick who fell in love with Olondria." The novel uses this thematic material to comment on class division and rural-urban differences. Furthermore, it investigates discriminatory beliefs against illiterate people in a culture steeped in literacy.

Nic Clarke also commented on the novel's treatment of language and culture. Jevick's childhood education in Olondrian texts leaves him out of touch with the culture of his home island; nevertheless, he is still not able to function as a native of Olondria. The novel also explores different forms of storytelling; Jevick experiences poetry performances, oral folktales, and written histories. Furthermore, Jevick perceives himself to be better than Jissavet due to her illiteracy and inability to speak Olondrian.

Clarke further commented on the way in which Jissavet's vallon reflects the themes of the novel:

[W]hat they create together is both product and mirror of their flaws and something bigger than either of them. It is an act of translation: of life into narrative, of spoken language into marks on a page, of one culture's invention adopted and adapted and subverted to serve another's needs.

Geoff Ryman noted that Jevick's use of Olondrian characters to transcribe his local language was not entirely positive. Jevick unwittingly participates in the destruction of his own oral culture, and the book A Stranger in Olondria is only possible as a result of this destruction.

=== Relationship with African fiction ===
Geoff Ryman noted that the novel was quintessentially Pan-African in its outlook. Many African readers love literature which initially came from an imperialist and colonialist past. Likewise, "the novel communicates powerfully a love of literature, and an equally intense distrust of it."

Many African novels feature a protagonist who leaves to go north, then returns as a stranger. Ryman compares Samatar's book to such works as We Need New Names by NoViolet Bulawayo and A Tail of the Bluebird by Nii Parkes. All of these works involve the concept of travel, cultural exchange, and the resulting alienation from one's home culture.

The relationship between life and death is another common theme in African literature. Jissavet replaces her own traditional burial rites with the creation of her vallon; this parallels the usurpation of traditional African death rituals by imperial practices.

== Background ==
In a 2016 interview, Samatar stated that Olondria was partially inspired by the Ottoman Empire, specifically the Tulip Period. Another significant source of inspiration was Alexandria, Egypt, where she did many major revisions. She wrote the first draft in South Sudan, which served as the inspiration for Jevick's homeland of the Tea Islands.

== Reception and awards ==
Writing for Reactor, author Amal El-Mohtar praised the author's writing style. The review stated that the book "rewards lovers of prose style and evocative description." The same review praised the novel's thematic content, stating that "Samatar delivers a story about our vulnerability to language and literature, and the simultaneous experience of power and surrender inherent in the acts of writing and reading."

Writing for Strange Horizons, Nic Clarke praised the poetic prose and the detailed worldbuilding, which is often accomplished through the use of offhand details. The same review commented on the fact that neither Jevick nor Jissavet are perfect people, and that their flaws made them compelling characters.

Also writing for Strange Horizons, Geoff Ryman praised the thematic content of the novel. Ryman wrote that the novel explores themes including Pan-Africanism, colonialism, and the conflict between oral and written traditions.

Year	Award	Category	Result	Ref.
2013	Nebula Award	Novel	Nominated	
2014	British Fantasy Award	Fantasy Novel	Won	
2014	Crawford Award	—	Won	
2014	Locus Award	First Novel	Finalist	
2014	World Fantasy Award	Novel	Won	
