= Fly by Night (Hardinge novel) =

2005 children's novel by Frances Hardinge

- First edition cover (UK)
- Author: Frances Hardinge
- Cover artist: Brett Helquist (US)
- Language: English
- Series: Mosca Mye novels
- Genre: Children's or young adult fiction, fantasy novel
- Publisher: UK: Macmillan; US: HarperCollins
- Publication date: 7 October 2005
- Publication place: United Kingdom
- Media type: Print (hardback & paperback)
- Pages: 304 pp (first edition, hardcover)
- ISBN: 1-4050-2078-4
- OCLC: 61884943
- Preceded by: None
- Followed by: Twilight Robbery

Fly by Night is a children's or young adults' fantasy novel by Frances Hardinge, published on 7 October 2005 by Macmillan in the UK and on 25 April 2006 by HarperCollins in the US. Fly by Night won the Branford Boase Award in 2006, and was listed in the School Library Journal's Best Books of 2006. It was shortlisted for the 2006 Guardian Children's Fiction Prize, as was its sequel Twilight Robbery in 2011.

Hardinge's comic fantasy is set in the grotesque imaginary world of The Realm, which, as she writes in an after note, bears some similarity to early 18th century England. As religion, the people venerate numerous small deities known as the Beloved, each sacred to a part of a day in the year. Children must be named for the Beloved in whose time they are born, though a degree of fraud occurs to obtain a better name. This religion has been restored following a period when a militant movement, the Bird-catchers, sought to impose their own puritanical religion, leading to a civil war in which the Bird-catchers were defeated.

The novel takes place at a time when the monarchy has been overthrown and The Realm has fractured into city states such as Mandelion, where the guilds, especially the Stationers and Locksmiths, act as power brokers. Numerous claimants to the throne are recognized and locally supported, but more by tradition than genuine desire for restoration. Mandelion is currently ruled by Duke Vocado Avourlace, brother of Lady Tamarind, and supporter of the claim of the Twin Princesses. He remains unmarried since being turned down by one of them.

== Synopsis ==
Mosca is the daughter of Quillam Mye, an exiled writer and radical political agitator, who taught her to read but died when she was eight. She was born in the hours sacred to Goodman Palpitattle, He Who Keeps Flies out of Jams and Butterchurns, and thus was given the name Mosca, Italian for fly. Now twelve and living with her uncle, a miller, she yearns for the city education her father promised. She sees her opportunity when poet and conman Eponymous Clent comes to their village, and is locked overnight in the stocks. She steals the keys and releases Clent, accidentally burning down the mill which creates a useful distraction. In return, Clent agrees to give her a job, and bring her to Mandelion. She takes her fierce goose Saracen to face down the guard-dogs.

Clent tries to lose Mosca, but soon learns she is useful to him and accepts her. Mosca and Clent have an adventurous journey to Mandelion. On the way, they encounter Lady Tamarind's coach held up by Black Captain Blythe, a highwayman. Clent negotiates their safe passage, finding a way to gain the gratitude of both parties. In Mandelion, a hornet's nest of political intrigue, crime and corruption, they lodge in a marriage house, which arranges weddings for people who can't afford a church. Clent has been contracted as an informer for the Stationers’ Guild, who want him to find out the origin of illegal anonymous leaflets which promote a radical cause. They suspect it is some kind of provocation organised by their rivals the Locksmiths’ Guild.

Unable to find a school to take her, Mosca agrees to work as Clent's spying assistant, and becomes entangled in the politics. Saracen is employed to take part in a beast-fight at an inn, to help Clent find out what is going on there. They become inconveniently implicated in the murder of Partridge, a barge captain who transported Saracen to Mandelion, while also smuggling lead for rebels to make bullets. Investigating this leads Mosca to identify the rebels, thereby uncovering a plot quite different from what anyone suspected. The resolution of it produces a surprising regime change.

In the end, having made too many enemies, Clent has to leave Mandelion. Mosca chooses life on the road with Clent, thus providing a lead to the sequel Twilight Robbery.
