= Unravel =

Unravel may refer to:

- "Unravel" (Björk song), 1997
- "Unravel" (TK song), 2014
- Unravel (video game), a 2016 video game

== See also ==
- Unraveled (disambiguation)
- Unraveller (disambiguation)
- Unravelling (disambiguation)
