= Selkie Stories Are for Losers =

2013 short story by Sofia Samatar

- Short story by Sofia Samatar
- Country: United States
- Language: English
- Genre: Fantasy

Publication
- Published in: Strange Horizons
- Publication date: 7 Jan 2013

"Selkie Stories Are for Losers" is a 2013 fantasy/magic realism short story by American writer Sofia Samatar, exploring the myth of the selkie from the perspective of those left behind. It was first published in Strange Horizons.

== Synopsis ==
A young woman works in a restaurant, and reflects on her mother's disappearance, on how that disappearance bears an uncomfortable resemblance to the legend of the selkie, and on what this may mean for her budding romance with a coworker.

== Reception and awards ==
At Kirkus Reviews, Ana Grilo described the story as "subtle (...) with minimalistic worldbuilding" and "an almost poetic cadence", emphasizing the degree to which the story is about consent.

Shana E. Hadi of The Stanford Daily wrote that the story "offers an emotive portrayal of how we integrate stories in our lives during periods of loss." Hadi notes that traditional selkie stories cover the plight of a woman who is forced into human form and then marriage; when she recovers her seal-skin, she returns to her original home. These stories rarely cover the feelings of the children who are left behind. The title can be read in multiple ways; the narrator is a "loser" with failed relationships, but is also a "loser" because she has lost her mother. Hadi further commented on the combination of the mundane and fantastical, noting that the selkie element of the tale may be real or it may be a way for the narrator to rationalize her loss.

Year	Award	Category	Result	Ref.
2013	BSFA Award	Short Fiction	Shortlisted	
2013	Nebula Award	Short Story	Nominated	
2014	Hugo Award	Short Story	Finalist	
2014	World Fantasy Award	Short Fiction	Nominated	
