= Unravelling =

Unravelling, or variants, may refer to:

- Unravelling (logic), a concept in sheaf theory
- Unravelling, a novel by Elizabeth Graver
- "The Unravelling" (Lioness), a television episode
- a concept in economics

== Music ==
=== Albums ===
- Unravelling (album), by We Were Promised Jetpacks, 2014
- The Unraveling (Drive-By Truckers album), 2020
- The Unraveling (Rise Against album) or the title song, 2001
- The Unraveling (EP), or the title song, "Unraveling", by Dir En Grey, 2013

=== Songs ===
- "Unraveling" (song), by Sevendust, 2010
- "Unravelling" (Muse song), by Muse, 2025
- "Unravelling", a song by Charlotte Church from Back to Scratch
- "Unraveling", a song by Evanescence from Synthesis
- "Unravelling", a song by Melanie C from Version of Me
- "Unravelling", a song by Wendy Matthews from Beautiful View

== See also ==
- Unravel (disambiguation)
- Unraveled (disambiguation)
- Unraveller (disambiguation)
