= Tide Child trilogy =

Series of fantasy novels by R. J. Barker

- Cover art for The Bone Ships, book one in the trilogy
- The Bone Ships; Call of the Bone Ships; The Bone Ship's Wake
- Author: R. J. Barker
- Country: United Kingdom
- Language: English
- Publisher: Orbit
- No. of books: 3

The Tide Child trilogy is a series of fantasy novels by R. J. Barker. It comprises The Bone Ships (2019), Call of the Bone Ships (2020), and The Bone Ship's Wake (2021). The first book in the trilogy won the 2020 British Fantasy Award for Best Novel.

== Plot ==
=== Prior to The Bone Ships ===
The Hundred Isles and the Gaunt Isles have been at war for centuries. Because the Scattered Archipelago contains very little plant life and no wood for ships, their warships are made from the bones of sea dragons called arakeesians. The arakeesians are apparently extinct. No more ships can be built, leading to a war of attrition. White ships are used in traditional battles, while black ships are crewed by condemned prisoners expected to die in battle.

The Hundred Isles has a matriarchal society in which citizens are valued for fertility and beauty. Women who survive childbirth and bear healthy children are elevated to Bern class. Healthy men may become Kept concubines by the Bern, but those with birth defects or other undesirable traits are relegated to lower castes. The firstborn healthy child from each family is sacrificed, and their soul is used to make a “corpse light” to light a white ship.

=== The Bone Ships ===
Joron Twiner is the son of a poor fisherman and is considered to be from a weak bloodline. Joron kills a man in a duel to avenge his father’s death. The man’s father, Kept Indyl Karrad, has Joron sentenced to serve as the shipwife (captain) of the black ship Tide Child. Aboard Tide Child, Joron spends most of his time drinking. “Lucky” Meas Gilbryn is the disgraced daughter of Thirteenbern Gilbryn, leader of the Hundred Isles. She wins command of Tide Child in a duel; Joron becomes her Deckkeeper, or second-in-command. Tide Child is badly damaged during a battle with raiders. He (Note: In the Scattered Archipelago, ships are called by masculine pronouns.) sails to Bernshulme, capital of the Hundred Isles, for repairs.

In Bernshulme, Karrad reveals that a living arakeesian has been spotted. Karrad and Meas both want to end the war with the Gaunt Islanders, though for different reasons. They plan to escort the arakeesian to a remote section of ocean and kill it so that the bones cannot be used to create more ships. Tide Child obtains a shipment of crossbow bolts, poisoned with "hiyl", with which to kill the creature. Meas assembles a crew of criminals, bodyguards, sailors from her previous ship, and a gullaime, a humanoid bird-like creature who can control the wind. Karrad sends a spy named Dinyl Kiveth to become part of the crew; Dinyl and Joron become friends and eventually lovers.

During a fight with raiders, the gullaime exhausts its supply of energy and becomes “windsick”, falling into a coma. Raiders hold control of towers on both Arkannis Isle and Skearith’s Spine, a mountain range that divides the Gaunt Isles and Hundred Isles. Tide Child's crew lands on the island. The gullaime is recharged by the island’s windspire. It assists Tide Child's crew with destroying the towers, allowing the arakeesian to continue its journey unharmed. After touching the windspire, Joron develops a supernatural connection to the gullaime.

Tide Child is chased by Hag's Hunter, a white ship captained by Meas’s sister Kyrie. Tide Child is defeated, but the arakeesian sinks Hag's Hunter before Meas can surrender. Dinyl tries to kill the arakeesian but Joron cuts off his hand, destroying their relationship. The gullaime tells the crew that more arakeesians will appear. Meas refuses to kill it, stating that her goals have changed. Meas orders the poisoned bolts to be dumped overboard, and the arakeesian swims away unharmed.

=== Call of the Bone Ships ===
Tide Child rescues a merchant ship. The crew find its hold full of human and gullaime slaves. The enslaved gullaime are Windshorn, with no magical abilities. Tide Child receives word that Safe Harbor, the peace faction’s primary hideout, has been destroyed by Thirteenbern Gilbryn. Joron leads an assault on Safe Harbor to rescue the surviving prisoners. Joron learns that more arakeesians have appeared; the slaves are being killed in order to manufacture hiyl. Meas leaves the ship in Joron’s command while she receives information from Indyl Karrad. With Dinyl’s help, Joron and the crew fight off a mutiny. Cwell, the mutiny’s leader, becomes Joron’s bodyguard.

Tide Child journeys to a slave trader’s island in search of their captured allies. They find a Windshorn named Madorra. They avoid an ambush and hijack the slavers’ ship, Keesian Tooth. In the process, Joron sings and summons an arakeesian which destroys the island. The arakeesian’s wake causes massive waves; in the chaos, Joron is injured and eventually has his leg amputated. Madorra tells Joron that he is a Caller and the ship’s gullaime is the Windseer, a figure that will save the gullaime by bringing about an apocalypse. It also tells the crew of Tide Child that the survivors from Safe Harbor were taken to Slatehulme.

Joron pilots Keesian Tooth to Slatehulme. Dinyl’s ship is destroyed by Slatehulme’s mangonel, and he is killed. Meas and Joron rescue the surviving prisoners from Safe Harbor. Slatehulme is besieged by Hundred Isles ships; they believe that Meas is the Caller. In exchange for Meas's surrender, the Hundred Isles ships allow the remaining members of the peace faction to leave the island. Joron assumes control of the fleet and becomes the temporary shipwife of Tide Child.

=== The Bone Ship's Wake ===
One year later, Joron leads a fleet of pirate ships allied with the Gaunt Isles. He allows ships from the Hundred Isles to escape with the rotting carcass of an arakeesian. This sparks a plague, devastating the population of Bernshulme. Tide Child is pursued by Hundred Isles ships. Joron sails his ship into a fog bank filled with icebergs. An arakeesian arrives, saving the ship. Rumors that Joron summoned the arakeesian begin to circulate, putting Meas’s life in danger.

Joron uses the pirate fleet to draw Thirteenbern Gilbryn’s attention while sneaking into Bernshulme. Joron confronts the Thirteenbern, and he realizes that she believes Meas to be dead. Indyl Karrad reveals that Meas is alive and is his prisoner. He overthrows the Thirteenbern and has her hanged. Joron and Meas escape back to Tide Child. Joron learns that all gullaime Windtalkers are female, and all Windshorn are male. Medora is holding the Windseer’s egg hostage. Joron rescues the Windseer’s egg, allowing her to kill Medora.

Karrad pursues Tide Child. Meas’s fleet is betrayed and flanked by the Gaunt Islands fleet. Joron and the Windseer summon arakeesians. The Windseer opens a path through the North Storm, which is the furthest border of the Scattered Archipelago. Joron and the Windseer sacrifice themselves to close the path, destroying their enemies and saving their fleet. Years later, the descendants of the survivors tell the story of Joron and Meas.

== Style ==
The Bone Ships is written entirely from the point of view of Joron Twiner.

== Reception ==
The Bone Ships won the 2020 British Fantasy Award for best fantasy novel.

Publishers Weekly gave a positive review to the first novel in the trilogy, comparing it favorably to the works of Patrick O'Brian and calling it a "very promising beginning" to the trilogy. Writing for Locus Magazine, Liz Bourke praised The Bone Ships for its characterization, well-written battle scenes, and worldbuilding. She did, however, note issues with the logistics of the novel's food supply chain. Megan Leigh of the British Fantasy Society felt that Joron was a "bland" protagonist, comparing him to Nick Carraway from The Great Gatsby in the sense that both characters are observers rather than drivers of the plot. However, she called the novel "delightful and refreshing", particularly praising the novel's worldbuilding and the character of the gullaime. Eloise Hopkins of the British Fantasy Society wrote that the worldbuilding of The Bone Ships was "well-developed down to the last intricate detail".

Eloise Hopkins stated that Call of the Bone Ships had "solidly crafted" dialogue and worldbuilding. She also stated that the inclusion of maps, illustrations, and sea ballads contributed to the novel's credibility. Publishers Weekly gave Call of the Bone Ships a positive review, praising the development of its "fascinating personal concerns" as well as the "awe-inspiring set pieces" of its action sequences.

Publishers Weekly gave a starred review to the final book of the trilogy, writing that The Bone Ship's Wake combines Patrick O'Brian's seafaring action sequences with Wagner's "operatic sturm und drang".
