= Andrea Stewart (author) =

American author of fantasy and science fiction (born 1982)

Andrea G. Stewart
- Stewart at World Fantasy Convention 2026
- Born: August 3, 1982 (age 44); Vancouver, Canada
- Occupation: Author
- Writing career
- Language: English
- Notable work: The Bone Shard Daughter

Andrea G. Stewart (born August 3, 1982) is an author of fantasy and science fiction novels. She is best known for her novel The Bone Shard Daughter, which was the first entry in the Drowning Empire trilogy.

== Early life and education ==
Stewart was born in Vancouver, Canada on August 3, 1982. She grew up in various locations within the United States. She holds a degree in economics.

== Career ==
As a child, Stewart was inspired by works including The Chronicles of Narnia, The Chronicles of Prydain, and The Last Unicorn. As an adult, she describes author Ted Chiang as one of her inspirations.

Stewart's first speculative fiction story, "Dreameater" was published in 2013. It was a quarterly winner in the Writers of the Future competition. Her first novel, an urban fantasy entitled Loose Changeling, followed in 2014.

Her 2020 novel The Bone Shard Daughter was the first entry in the Drowning Empire trilogy. The novel received critical attention; it was a finalist for the British Fantasy Award, Compton Crook Award, and Locus Award.

Her 2024 novel The Gods Below began a new fantasy trilogy.

== Personal life ==
Stewart is of mixed Asian descent. As of 2024, she lives in the San Francisco Bay Area with her husband and children.

== Works ==
=== Novels ===
All novels were published under the name Andrea Stewart, unless noted otherwise.

Changeling Wars

As A. G. Stewart:

1. — (1 April 2014). Loose Changeling. Igneous Books. ISBN 9780692356920.
2. — (19 October 2018). Spare Changeling. Igneous Books. ASIN B07JL3GMBZ.

The Drowning Empire

1. — (8 September 2020). The Bone Shard Daughter. Orbit Books. ISBN 9780316541428.
2. — (23 November 2021). The Bone Shard Emperor. Orbit Books. ISBN 9780316541503.
3. — (18 April 2023). The Bone Shard War. Orbit Books. ISBN 9780316541541.

The Hollow Covenant

1. — (3 September 2024). The Gods Below. Orbit Books. ISBN 9780316564892.
2. — (4 November 2025). The War Beyond. Orbit Books. ISBN 9780316564892.
3. Forthcoming: — (17 November 2026). The Legend Eternal. Orbit Books. ISBN 9780316564861.

Standalone

- Forthcoming: — (23 February 2027). Someone Else's Daughter. Poisoned Pen Press. ISBN 9781464271915.

== Awards and honors ==
Year	Work	Award	Category	Result	Ref.
2020	The Bone Shard Daughter	Goodreads Choice Award	Debut Novel	Finalist	
2020	The Bone Shard Daughter	Goodreads Choice Award	Fantasy	Finalist	
2021	The Bone Shard Daughter	British Fantasy Award	Fantasy Novel	Shortlisted	
2021	The Bone Shard Daughter	Compton Crook Award	—	Nominated	
2021	The Bone Shard Daughter	Locus Award	First Novel	Finalist	
