= Verdigris Deep =

Book by Frances Hardinge

- First edition cover
- Author: Frances Hardinge
- Language: English
- Genre: Children's fantasy
- Publisher: Macmillan Publishers
- Publication date: 4 May 2007
- Publication place: United Kingdom
- Media type: Print (Hardback & Paperback)
- Pages: 400 (first edition, hardback)
- ISBN: 978-1-4050-5537-6
- OCLC: 81453294

Verdigris Deep is a children's fantasy novel by Frances Hardinge. It concerns three children who fall into the power of a "well witch" after stealing coins from a wishing well. They are given various powers to grant the wishes of others. While many of the wishes seem harmless they all eventually lead to perilous fates. It was originally published by Macmillan in the UK in 2007 and released in the United States a year later under the title Well Witched.

== Plot summary ==
The story starts when Ryan, Chelle and Josh stranded without their bus fare home. Josh climbs into an old wishing well and retrieves some blackened coins. The next day, odd things begin to happen. Ryan sees a watery face in the mirror, and finds white lumps on his hands. Light bulbs explode in Josh's house, and Chelle's babbling becomes shockingly strange.

Ryan has a vision of the well witch, and understands from her gargled words that, because they took the coins, they are now in her service. She has given each of them powers so that they can find other wishers, discover their wishes and help grant them. She also gives him the name of a nearby village. In the village, they realize that Chelle is speaking aloud the thoughts of a tea-shop man, Will Wurthers. They guess that he wished for a Harley-Davidson and persuade him to enter a competition to win at the fete where the winner of the motorcycle is to be announced, they hear the thoughts of an unhappy mime who wishes (they think) for fame. In their attempt to grant his wish they inadvertently cause a riot at the fete. Then they learn that Will has been badly injured in an accident. When Chelle overhears the thoughts of someone wishing for bloody revenge she gets frightened, and she and Ryan decide they should not grant any more wishes.

Josh, however, is determined to hang on to his increasing power over all machines, metals and electronic devices. When he goes berserk and tries to kill Ryan's mother, Ryan thinks of a way to diminish the witch's power. But Josh also has a plan, and it nearly results in the death of them all.

== Characters ==
Ryan: Ryan is a bright but quiet boy with only two friends: Chelle and Josh. He is known for his "upside down" way of seeing things. The well witch grants him a power of sight, which shows itself through the eyes growing on his hands like warts. He can see her when she chooses to communicate. He can see Josh's power in action, and sees people's wishes as translucent snakes growing from their chests. He also has insights into the situation of the well witch and into the true nature of wishes.

Chelle: Chelle is an insecure girl with a tendency to babble. She hates getting in trouble and has a low opinion of herself. Her power is telepathic, as the thoughts of the people who have made wishes at the well spill uncontrollably out of her mouth when they are nearby.

Josh: Josh is the leader of trio. He is confident, energetic and popular. However, he feels unwanted by his adoptive parents, who are getting divorced, and is jealous of Ryan's family. Josh's power is related to electromagnetism and affects metals, mechanisms and electronics. He is excited by his power as he gains more control over it, and is impatient of the moral qualms of Ryan and Chelle.

Mother Leathertongue: Also known as the well witch, she is an ancient water spirit who lives at the bottom of the well. She gains power through the granting of wishes, but the complexity of the human world baffles her so that she has to work through surrogates. Her power can cause torrential rain and flooding.

Miss Gossamer: Miss Gossamer is an elderly woman, a friend of Chelle's family, who recognises the trio's powers. The previous "Well's Angels" drowned her beloved baby daughter - because during her unwanted pregnancy she had wished not to have a child. On the edge of insanity, she believes that Chelle and the others are demons, not children.

== Awards ==
The novel was nominated for the Carnegie Medal in 2008.
