= Gullstruck Island =

2009 book by Frances Hardinge

The Lost Conspiracy
- First edition
- Author: Frances Hardinge
- Original title: Gullstruck Island
- Genre: Fantasy novel
- Publisher: Macmillan
- Publication date: 1 June 2009
- Pages: 568

Gullstruck Island, (also known as The Lost Conspiracy) was written by Frances Hardinge and published on 1 June 2009. It was the fourth fantasy book written by Frances Hardinge.

== Summary ==
The Lost are a kind of oracle that can send their minds out across Gullstruck Island in order to do many impossible tasks, such as finding criminals. The Lace are a tribe on Gullstruck Island that have been mistrusted for several centuries after they committed murders against other settlers. In recent years, the Lace have proclaimed that one of their own people, a girl named Arilou, is a Lost, and have managed to obtain some recognition and respect for themselves. With the help of her younger sister/assistant Hathin, Arilou is trained to take part in a special test that will examine her abilities.

The issue with Arilou is that she may not be a Lost at all, but rather an imbecile. Hathin is forced to keep up the lie for her people's sake, especially since the test could well oust Arilou as an imposter and endanger the Lace's future.
