= Unraveller (novel) =

Fantasy novel by Frances Hardinge

- Author: Frances Hardinge
- Language: English
- Genre: Children's or young adult fiction, Fantasy
- Published: 10 January 2022
- Publisher: Macmillan
- Publication place: UK
- Pages: 496
- ISBN: 9781529081411

Unraveller is a children's or young adults' fantasy novel by Frances Hardinge, published in 2022 by Macmillan Children's Books. It is the tenth novel written by Hardinge.

== Plot ==
The novel is set in the fictional country of Raddith, which is divided between normal human settlements inland and the mystical marsh-woods that borders the coastline. These marsh-woods are known as the "Wilds" and are inhabited by supernatural creatures, such as the Little Brothers, small arachnid-like creatures that sometimes offer "curse eggs" to humans, which bestow the ability to curse another human once. The nature of each curse is unique, and can range from continuously bleeding from the hands to being transformed into a harp. The only requisite to become a curser is to feel extreme hatred towards someone else, but lifting a curse once cast is virtually impossible. Only other cursers are immune to the effect of curses. Diplomacy between the creatures of the Wilds and the humans is handled by the Raddith government, called the Chancery.

The novel follows the teenagers Kellen, who gained the ability to lift curses after he accidentally killed a little brother, and Nettle, a girl who had her curse (being transformed into a heron) lifted by Kellen. Kellen is the only one who can lift curses, a process he likens to unraveling a weave. The pair is hired by Chancery official Leona Tharl to investigate a conspiracy involving a curser group known as Salvation. The pair travels through the Wilds, accompanied by Tharl's bodyguard Gall. Nettle has recurring visions of a mother swan trying to offer her a cygnet to eat, and one night she disappears. Gall tells Kellen he believes Nettle is a curser who has run away to join Salvation, but Kellen doesn't believe his friend has betrayed him. The pair is ambushed by Salvation agents and Gall is mortally wounded. They escape, reaching the giant spiderweb castle that serves as the residence for the Little Brothers.

It is revealed Nettle ran away from the group due to the guilt she felt about harboring a curse egg. After reaching the Salvation hideout she discovers the conspiracy was orchestrated by Shay Ammet, a different Chancery official. Ammet created Salvation to manufacture hatred among known cursers to target curses at his political enemies and thus control Chancery. Ammet welcomes Nettle to Salvation but plan to hold her hostage to get Kellen, whom he needs to protect him from curses as Ammet is not a curser himself. Kellen finds out about this, and devises a plan with the Little Brothers to pretend he is getting sold at one of the auctions held in the Wilds. The plan goes awry when Kellen is actually put up for sale at the auction, and Shay Ammet purchases him in return for setting Nettle free. However, Kellen tricks Ammet into saying Salvation will cease cursing people if left alone in front of a Bookbearer, an entity of the Wild that makes promises binding. Ammet tries to get out of fulfilling his promise by killing the Bookbearer, but is killed instead. Later, the Little Brothers forgive Kellen for the accidental death of one of their own, and expresses their regret for having given curse eggs out so haphazardly. They promise to be much more careful with who they give the ability to curse in the future.

== Reception ==
The novel received positive reviews from critics, with The Guardian calling it "Hardinge's best yet".

Kirkus Reviews highlighted the world of Raddith, writing: "Hardinge has a rare gift for crafting strange and original worlds, and here she's in top form as she chucks two teenagers into webs of deadly magic and conspiracy..."

School Library Journal writes: "If you would like to read a story you've never read before, one that flies by the light of an internal logic so straight and true that you never doubt for a moment that this is a real world, Unraveller is your next read."

Strange Horizons writes: "There's always a delightful inventiveness to her worldbuilding, [...] and she strings together several concepts which would each be enough for one book in the hands of lesser writers."
