= The Lie Tree =

Fantasy novel by Frances Hardinge

- Author: Frances Hardinge
- Cover artist: James Fraser
- Genre: Children's fantasy
- Set in: Victorian Britain
- Published: 2015 (Macmillan)
- Publication place: UK
- Pages: 413
- Awards: 2015 Costa Book of the Year
- ISBN: 978-1-4472-6411-8

The Lie Tree is the seventh children's historical fantasy novel by Frances Hardinge, published in 2015 by Macmillan Publishers. The book won the 2015 Costa Book of the Year.

== Premise ==
Faith Sunderly, the novel's 14-year old protagonist, lives in a male-dominated Victorian scientific society. Her father is killed under unknown circumstances after the family moves from London to a small island. Following her father in studying natural science, Faith discovers a tree that provides truths by feeding on whispered lies.

== Reception ==
The Guardian praised The Lie Tree's "convincing picture of the times" and Hardinge's "trademark wit and intelligence", calling the book "at once entertaining and provocative". The Sunday Times named the book its children's book of the year for 2015.

In the 2015 Costa Book Awards, The Lie Tree won both in the Children's Book Award category and the overall Book of the Year, an achievement only previously managed by Philip Pullman's The Amber Spyglass in 2001. The judges for the Children's Book Award "loved [the] dark, sprawling, fiercely clever novel", stating it would "grip readers of all ages", while the chair of the judges for the Book of the Year award described the book as a "real page turner", suitable for adults as much as for children.

In 2021 the Japanese edition of The Lie Tree was shortlisted for the Best Translated Honkaku Mystery of the Decade (2010-2019).
