= Eliza Chan =

Scottish writer

- Born: c. 1985; Scotland
- Occupation: Writer
- Website: www.elizachan.co.uk

Eliza Chan (born c. 1985) is a Scottish fantasy author. Her work blends elements of English and East Asian folklore.

Eliza Chan was born in Scotland and grew up near Glasgow, the daughter of immigrants from Hong Kong. She initially rejected her Cantonese heritage due to racism and embarrassment, but embraced it in college after meeting other Asian students. She attended the University of Edinburgh initially planning to become a doctor, but instead graduated from the University of Glasgow with a degree in English. She taught English for three years in Japan before studying in London to become a speech and language therapist.

Her short story "The Tails that Made You" was published in Fantasy in August 2022 and was nominated for a 2023 British Fantasy Award for Best Short Fiction. Chan cites a variety of inspirations for this story, including the #metoo movement, the murder of Sarah Everard, and anti-Asian hate crimes. She has also published stories in New Horizons and in a number of anthologies, including The Secret Romantic’s Book of Magic (2025) and Beyond & Within: Witchcraft Short Stories (2026).

Her first two novels formed her Drowned World duology published by Orbit Books: Fathomfolk (2024) and Tideborn (2025). They are set in the partially submerged city of Tiankawi, where humans dwell above the water and water creatures from Scottish and Asian folklore like kelpies and kappas, called "fathomfolk", live beneath polluted waters. The protagonists are Nami, a water dragon from a prominent family, Mira, a half-siren raised in poverty, and Cordelia, a shapechanging sea witch. Fathomfolk appeared on the Sunday Times bestseller list. Her next series is Chronicles of the Yiugwai Hunters, beginning with Harbour of Hungry Ghosts (2026). It is set in 19th century Hong Kong between the two Opium Wars and features a Hungry Ghost Festival, jiangshi, nǚ guǐ, and a family of hereditary demon hunters, the Au family.

== Bibliography ==
- Fathomfolk. Orbit, 2024. ISBN 978-0-316-56492-2
- Tideborn. Orbit, 2025. ISBN 978-0-356-52540-2
- Harbour of Hungry Ghosts. Orbit, 2026. ISBN 978-0-356-52660-7
