= Cuckoo Song (novel) =

2014 novel by Frances Hardinge

- Author: Frances Hardinge
- Cover artist: Kamille Freske (paperback 1st ed)
- Language: English
- Genre: Children's or young adult fiction, fantasy novel
- Publisher: UK: Macmillan; US: Abrams Amulet
- Publication date: 8 May 2014
- Publication place: United Kingdom
- Media type: Print (hardback & paperback)
- Pages: 416 pp (1st ed paperback)
- ISBN: 978-0-330-51973-1
- OCLC: 1031707809

Cuckoo Song is a children's or young adults' fantasy novel by Frances Hardinge, published on 8 May 2014 by Macmillan in the UK, and by Abrams Amulet in the US. It won the 2015 Robert Holdstock Award for best fantasy novel, and was short-listed for the 2015 Carnegie Medal.

The story takes place in the early 1920s, a few years after the First World War. It is mainly set in the imaginary English city of Ellchester. Ellchester is beside an estuary, hilly, and has many bridges. It also has a fairy underworld, called the Underbelly, populated by the Besiders, forgotten fairy beings. The Architect built it as a new home for them to move to now hidden secret places in the countryside are becoming rare.

Hardinge tells us that the name of The Grimmer, the pond Triss is rescued from, is taken from the name of a millpond in her grandmother's village, Wickham Skeith in Suffolk. The character of Violet Parish is loosely based on her grandmother, who as a young woman shocked her home village by arriving there riding a motorcycle.

== Plot ==
Triss has been unwell since being rescued from The Grimmer, a pond near their holiday cottage in Lower Bentling. Her memory is hazy. She sees her dolls coming alive. She has a gargantuan appetite, and feels an urge to eat her possessions as well as food. She finds dead leaves in her hair, and her tears are spiderweb. Her sister Pen hates her with a vengeance, and makes curious insinuations. At home in Ellchester, she discovers a Besider delivering letters from her dead brother, Sebastian, who writes of being stuck in a perpetual winter. Catching it, she learns about the Underbelly where many Besiders live, and that she only has seven days to live.

Triss follows Pen to a meeting with the Architect. Pen admits she led Triss to the Grimmer to be abducted. The Besiders threw a stick doll containing some of Triss's possessions into the Grimmer, which emerged as a changeling with Triss's appearance and some of her memories. Learning she is not the real Triss, she now identifies herself as Not-Triss.

Mr Grace the tailor exposes Not-Triss as a Besider changeling to her parents, and urges them to burn her. Pen rescues her, having become sympathetic to Not-Triss's situation. Violet Parish helps keep them safe from Mr Grace and her parents. The girls visit the Underbelly to meet the Shrike, who explains Triss's abduction was to punish her father for breaking an agreement with the Architect.

Not-Triss now seeks to locate and rescue the real Triss from the Architect. She also wants to release Sebastian's soul, and prolong Not-Triss's own life beyond its seven-day design.

In the end Not-Triss manages to save herself by trapping one of her belongings in her brother's watch and frees Sebastian from the limbo of the afterlife while saving Violet from her winter curse.

== Characters ==
- Triss (Theresa) Crescent –a fragile 12-yr-old girl, has been unwell since she fell into the Grimmer, a large pond near their holiday house
- Not-Triss, Fake-Triss, Trista – names that refer to the seven-day stick-doll changeling that replaces the real Triss
- Pen (Penny, Penelope) Crescent – Triss's tough 9-yr-old sister, hates Triss, prone to run away from home
- Sebastian Crescent – Triss's older brother, died in the First World War, but apparently still sends regular letters
- Piers Crescent – Triss's father, municipal architect of Ellchester
- Celeste Crescent – Triss's mother, prone to tiredness
- Violet Parish – Sebastian's former fiancée, rides a motorbike; her presence for any extended time causes snowfall
- Jack – Violet's friend, fought alongside Sebastian and saw him die
- Joseph Grace – a tailor, thinks he knows what is wrong with Triss
- Dr Mallows – The Crescents’ family doctor
- Besiders – forgotten fairy creatures from the countryside, who are moving to live in secretly constructed urban havens; frightened of scissors and roosters
- The Bird-thing – a small flying Besider with the face of an old lady, delivers letters from Sebastian
- The Architect – chief Besider, designs the urban Besider havens, organised the swap of Triss for Not-Triss
- The Shrike – powerful Besider, creator of Not-Triss

== Unmade adaptation ==
In December 2020 it was announced that Cuckoo Song would be adapted for Netflix by screenwriter Sarah Dollard. In July 2022, it was announced the project had been cancelled.
