= Peter McLean (singer) =

- Born: Australia
- Occupations: Musician; songwriter
- Instrument: Vocals
- Years active: 1958-1975
- Labels: Planet Records; Cherry Pie; Polydor

Peter McLean is an Australian folk singer/songwriter. In January 1973, his single "Tom" peaked at number 48 on the Australian singles chart.

== Discography ==
=== Studio albums ===
List of studio albums, with selected details
Title	Album details
Rock N' Roll Party (with The Henri Bource All Stars)	Released: 1958; Format: LP; Label: Planet (PP 016)
Snips n' Snails, Sugar & Spice (As Peter McLean's World Of Children)	Released: 1973; Format: LP; Label: Cherry Pie (CPS 1011)
Fair Dinkum Folk (A Collection of Australian Colonial Ballads)	Released: 1974; Format: LP; Label: Polydor (2907 013)
Gently	Released: 1974; Format: LP; Label: Polydor (2907 018)

=== Extended plays ===
List of extended plays, with selected details
Title	EP details
Sincerely Peter McLean (with Teddy Preston and His Orchestra)	Released: 1958; Format: EP; Label: Planet (PZ 026)

=== Singles ===
List of singles, with selected chart positions
Year	Title	Peak chart positions
Year	Title	AUS
1958	"Hard Headed Woman" (with The Henri Bource All Stars)	—N/a
1958	"Don't Ask Me Why" (with The Henri Bource All Stars)	—N/a
1958	"Reet Petite" / "Your Book of Life" (with The Henri Bource All Stars)	—N/a
1959	"Jealous Heart" (with The Henri Bource All Stars)	—N/a
1961	"Starbright" / "Clementine"	—N/a
1962	"Wonder Welcome to the West" / "Rollin' Old River (The Swan River Song)"	—N/a
1969	"Savage Shadows" / "And the Rain Came Down"	—N/a
1972	"Tom" / "Fantasy Child"	48
1974	"Freedom" / "Thunder Boy"	—
1974	"Bed Boyd" / "It's You I Gotta Be Near"	—
1975	"Morgana" / "City Folk"	—
