= The Bone Shard Daughter =

2020 fantasy novel by Andrea Stewart

- Author: Andrea Stewart
- Language: English
- Series: The Drowning Empire
- Release number: 1
- Genre: Fantasy
- Published: September 8, 2020
- Publisher: Orbit Books
- Publication place: United States
- ISBN: 9780316541428
- Followed by: The Bone Shard Emperor

The Bone Shard Daughter is a 2020 fantasy novel by Andrea Stewart. It is the first book in the Drowning Empire trilogy. It was a finalist for the British Fantasy Award for Best Fantasy Novel, Compton Crook Award, and Locus Award for Best First Novel.

== Plot summary ==
=== Premise ===
The Sukai Dynasty rules over the Phoenix Empire, an archipelago of floating islands scattered throughout the Endless Sea. The Empire was founded centuries ago after the defeat of the Alanga, who were said to have destructive powers. The Emperor uses bone shard magic to control the Empire. Each citizen is forced to give a portion of their skull bone to the Empire. If the bone is used to power a magical construct, the life force of the unlucky citizen is drained away. The Emperor’s rule is failing; a rebel group known as the Shardless Few hopes to overthrow him. Meanwhile, rumors swirl about the return of the Alanga.

=== Plot ===
Lin, the daughter of the Emperor, has lost many of her memories due to an illness. Her foster brother Bayan has also lost his memories. The Emperor forces Lin and Bayan to compete for knowledge about bone shard magic. Lin steals keys from her father and copies them with the help of the blacksmith Numeen. She breaks into the palace library and steals a book about bone shard magic. Lin decides to subvert control of the four major constructs which run her father’s government.

Meanwhile, a smuggler named Jovis searches for his missing wife, Emahla. Seven years ago, Emahla has been kidnapped and taken aboard a boat with blue sails. On Deerhead Island, he learns that another woman went missing under similar circumstances. An earthquake strikes the island, causing it to sink into the sea. During the escape, Jovis rescues a young boy and a furry creature named Mephi. Jovis begins to rescue children from the Empire, becoming a folk hero. At the same time, Mephi develops the ability to speak. Their connection grants Joviss powers which include superhuman strength.

On Nephilanu Island, Phalue is the daughter of the wealthy governor. Her lover Ranami introduces Phalue to Gio, the leader of the Shardless Few. Phalue is torn between her father and Ranami, but agrees to help the Shardless Few. The narratives begin to converge when Jovis arrives on Nephilanu Island. Ranami and Gio offer him information about the blue-sailed ship if he agrees to help the Shardless Few.

Meanwhile, Lin secretly takes control of two of the four top-ranking constructs. She also discovers a document claiming that Lin Sukai died at the age of three. The Emperor's constructs kill Numeen and his family. Lin learns that she is a replica of the Emperor's deceased wife, Nisong. Despite being made without bone shards, Lin is still an artificial creation.

On Nephilanu Island, the Shardless Few attack and depose the governor. Phalue takes his place. Ranami tells Jovis that the blue-sailed boat has gone to Maila Island, but that no one has ever returned. Jovis accepts that his wife is likely dead and agrees to join the Shardless Few. Lin and Bayan join forces to fight the Emperor. They use bone shard magic to turn his constructs against him. Bayan is killed. Lin uses a construct designed by the original Nisong to kill the Emperor. Under the palace, she rescues an imprisoned creature and names it Thrana. Jovis reaches Imperial Island. He and Mephi are found by Lin and Thrana, who appears to be the same species as Mephi. Jovis agrees to help Lin remake the Empire. During a ceremony in which is promoted to become Captain of the Imperial Guard, Jovis realizes that Lin’s eyes look like Emahla’s.

In a separate narrative, Sand lives on Maila Island. She seems to have lost her memories. She falls from a tree, injuring herself. When she awakens, she begins to question her life on the island. As Sand recovers more of her memories, she convinces a group of other islanders to attack the blue-sailed ship when it returns. Sand possesses memories of the original Nisong; she deduces that she is a construct, but takes the name for herself. As the Emperor dies, the mental fog hanging over Nisong and her companions lifts completely. They gather supplies to form an army and sail toward the rest of the Empire.

== Background and publication history ==
In an interview with Mixed Asian Media, Stewart described some of her inspirations for the novel. Stewart recalled an incident in which she and her friends were eating Chinese food at a food court in Texas. Her friend found a shard of bone in her food, almost choking on it. Stewart described this incident as the "story seed" that led to her ideas about bone shard magic.

== Style ==
There are five point of view characters in the novel. Two are written in first person, while the remaining three are written in third person.

S. Qiouyi Lu described the book's aesthetic as Pan-Asian. There is no direct connection to our world. In the world of the Sukai Dynasty, Lin was born in the year 1522. The architecture and technology of the story alludes to several real-world sixteenth century events and settings, including the Joseon dynasty of Korea, the Ming dynasty of China, the Thai Ayutthaya Kingdom, and the Mughal Empire, among others. Lu commented that the novel evokes, but never specifically alludes to, these specific historical periods. Lu commented that "the world is Asian-inspired, after all, not Asian."

== Major themes ==
Carly Silver wrote that the novel explores the conflict between personal comfort and justice. This is particularly shown in the story of Phalue and Ranami. Phalue is good-hearted but "is still mired in a bubble of wealth and privilege that she doesn’t feel comfortable leaving." Phalue is forced to choose between family and wealth on one hand, and her true love and justice on the other.

Adam Weller wrote that the use of constructs allows citizens to be treated as "spare parts", and that the constructs were the Empire's most reliable workers. This parallels the real-life use of machines to replace human laborers. Weller concluded that the novel presents an "interesting look at the economic value of humans versus constructs, which is the only value that some of the ruling class cares to see."

S. Qiouyi Lu stated that the book "explores three interrelated themes that feed into one another: empire, agency, and identity." Lu states that the institution of the tithing festival, in which citizens are drained of their life force, reveals "the cost of colonialism in terms of human potential." In Lu's view, this is a theme often explored by writers in the Asian diaspora, "as many of us are postcolonial subjects."

Lu further discussed the way in which agency is portrayed in the novel. Characters such as Lin are born in positions of power; characters such as Sand have nothing. Despite their different backgrounds, "each character makes choices on their own behalf to change their circumstances." Lu concludes that the combination of empire and agency reveal the true theme of the novel: personal identity. Lu states this conclusion as follows:

The message I took away from the novel was that the present you and your choices now define you more than who you were or who people want you to be. Each POV character has a turning point when they realize that what they do in the moment now matters more than who they were in the past. In doing so, each of the characters reshapes their personal narrative to construct a new identity for themselves that empowers them to achieve their goals.

== Reception and awards ==
Carly Silver of Book Reporter stated that the book "brings together the best of fantasy, romance and science fiction, melding them into one glorious one-stop shop of speculative fiction." Silver praised the way in which the lives of the characters intersected, noting that the author "raises thought-provoking questions that readers will use to examine their own world and life."

Katharine Coldiron of Locus Magazine called the book "surprisingly complex", while noting that it "expends a lot of its energy on setup, it’s still a finely made book, its ideas sewn deftly together to make a beautiful garment." Coldiron praised the worldbuilding, themes, and characters, though she also stated that the language is not as compelling as it could be, and some characters and plot points are not fully in focus. The review concluded that despite these flaws, The Bone Shard Daughter "is decidedly in the upper quarter of this year’s reading, and deserves as much attention as it can get."

Adam Weller, writing for Fantasy Book Review, gave the book a score of 9/10. The review praised the multiple points of view, as well as the thematic exploration of the value of human life. Weller concluded by calling the book a "rich and rewarding novel, original and thought-provoking... One of the year's best."

S. Qiouyi Lu, writing for Tor.com, praised the combination of various cultural aesthetics, concluding that the book "abstractly reflects Asian aesthetics and sensibilities, while also being an epic fantasy in the Western tradition with all its familiar archetypes and tropes." Lu praised the combination of organic bones and constructed language which together make up bone shard magic.

In a starred review, Kristi Chadwick of Library Journal praised the multiple points of view and worldbuilding. The review concluded that the book is a "richly told, emotional, action-laced debut [that] lays bare themes of autonomy, control, and the seeds of revolution that come from desiring a new way of life.".

Year	Award	Category	Result	Ref.
2020	Goodreads Choice Award	Debut Novel	Finalist	
2020	Goodreads Choice Award	Fantasy	Finalist	
2021	British Fantasy Award	Fantasy Novel	Shortlisted	
2021	Compton Crook Award	—	Nominated	
2021	Locus Award	First Novel	Finalist	
