= R. J. Barker =

British fantasy author

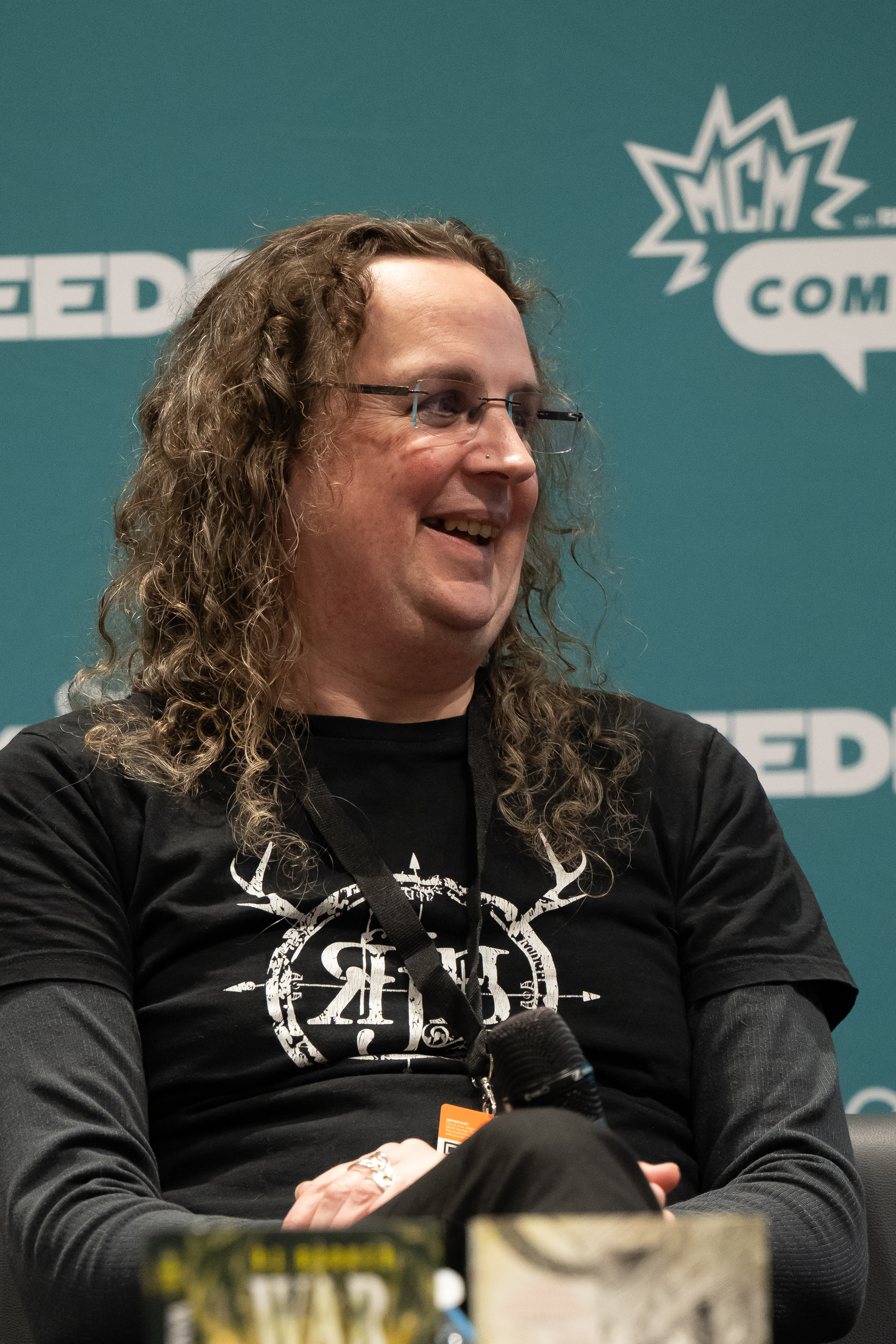
- At MCM London Comic Con, 25 October 2025
- Born: Leeds, England
- Occupation: Author
- Writing career
- Language: English
- Genre: Fantasy
- Notable works: Wounded Kingdom trilogy; Tide Child trilogy
- Website: www.rjbarker.com

R. J. Barker (or, RJ Barker) is a British author of fantasy literature. He is best known for his Wounded Kingdom trilogy and the Tide Child trilogy.

== Career ==
Barker is from Leeds, England. He played in a band for many years before realizing he "was never a very good musician", after which he turned to literature.

Barker served as a judge for the 2018 James White Award.

In 2021, Barker sold a new fantasy series the Forsaken trilogy to Orbit Books.

== Personal life ==
Barker has Crohn's disease. He has used his personal experiences to explore the presentation of disabled characters in fantasy literature.

== Reception and awards ==
Awards and honors
Year	Work	Award	Category	Result	Ref.
2018	Age of Assassins	British Fantasy Award	Best Novel	Shortlisted	
2018	Age of Assassins	British Fantasy Award	Best Newcomer	Shortlisted	
2018	Age of Assassins	Morningstar Award	Best Fantasy Newcomer	Finalist	
2020	The Bone Ships	British Fantasy Award	Best Novel	Won	
2024	Gods of the Wyrdwood	RUSA CODES Reading List	Fantasy	Won	

== Bibliography ==
=== Wounded Kingdom trilogy ===
- Age of Assassins (2017)
- Blood of Assassins (2018)
- King of Assassins (2018)

=== Tide Child trilogy ===
- The Bone Ships (2019)
- Call of the Bone Ships (2020)
- The Bone Ship's Wake (2021)

=== Forsaken trilogy ===
- Gods of the Wyrdwood (2023)
- Warlords of the Wyrdwood (2024)
- Heart of the Wyrdwood (2025)

=== The Trials of Irody Hasp series ===
- Mortedant's Peril (2026)
