= Peter McLean (author) =

British fantasy author (born 1972)

- Born: 1972 (age 53–54); London
- Occupation: Author
- Writing career
- Genre: Grimdark fantasy
- Website: talonwraith.com

Peter McLean (born 1972) is a British fantasy fiction writer. He is the author of the War for the Rose Throne series, the first of which was nominated for best fantasy novel at the British Fantasy Awards.

== Career ==
McLean was born in London in 1972, grew up in Norfolk, and has worked in Information Technology. He wrote the urban-fantasy Burned Man trilogy, the first novel of which, Drake, was a runner-up in the Locus magazine bestseller list in 2016. McLean's writing style has been characterised as Grimdark.

McLean began the War for the Rose Throne series in 2018, with the release of dark fantasy novel Priest of Bones about the priest, soldier and antihero Tomas Piety who returns home from war to recover his lost businesses and illegal enterprises. The first book received generally favourable reviews, with Dave Bradley of SFX stating it had a "fresh, confident take on the fantasy genre", and the Library Journal review concluding that it will appeal to "those who like their fantasy light on magic and heavy on violence and intrigue". The second book in the series, Priest of Lies, continues the story of Tomas Piety, and also received positive critical reception in Grimdark Magazine but with some reservations due to the repetitive writing style. The final book of the series, Priest of Crowns released in 2022, received a positive review in GeekDad which stated that McLean is "a voice that should be heard by many".

In 2023 Jo Fletcher Books signed McLean up for the standalone novel, Paved with Good Intentions, set in the same Rose Throne universe.

=== Awards ===
McLean's novel Priest of Bones was shortlisted, in the best fantasy novel category, at the 2019 British Fantasy Awards.

== Bibliography ==
=== Burned Man series ===
- McLean, Peter (2016). Drake. Angry Robot. ISBN 9780857665119.
- McLean, Peter (2016). Dominion. Angry Robot. ISBN 9780857666123.
- McLean, Peter (2017). Damnation. Angry Robot. ISBN 9780857666642.

=== War for the Rose Throne series ===
- McLean, Peter (2018). Priest of Bones. Penguin. ISBN 9780451490216.
- McLean, Peter (2019). Priest of Lies. Ace. ISBN 9780451490230.
- McLean, Peter (2022). Priest of Gallows. Quercus. ISBN 9781529411317.
- McLean, Peter (2023). Priest of Crowns. Quercus. ISBN 9781529411348.

=== Standalone novels ===
- McLean, Peter (2018). Baphomet by Night. Black Library. ISBN 9781785729737.
- McLean, Peter (2025). Paved with Good Intentions: A War for the Rose Throne novel. Arcadia. ISBN 9781529437171.
