= The Justice of Kings =

2022 novel by Richard Swan

- Author: Richard Swan
- Series: Empire of the Wolf
- Publisher: Orbit Books
- Publication date: 2022
- Followed by: The Tyranny of Faith

The Justice of Kings is a 2022 fantasy novel by Richard Swan. It is the first novel in the Empire of the Wolf trilogy.

== Synopsis ==
The book is set in the fictional Sovan Empire, where Justice Sir Konrad Vonvalt and his scribe Helena Sedanka investigate claims of paganism and heresy in a small village.

== Reception ==
The book received mostly positive reviews from critics for its tension and complex characters. Roy Salzman-Cohen, in a review for Strange Horizons, praised the book's use of fantasy and murder mystery elements as well as its philosophical exploration of justice. Kirkus Reviews awarded it a starred review, calling it "An intriguingly dark (and realistically depressing) deconstruction of a beloved mystery trope."

Adrian Collins of Grimdark Magazine considered the book's magic system and character development to some of its strongest point, while noting that the setting was "a relatively standard gritty medieval European fantasy world".

Publishers Weekly described the book as "riveting but uneven", praising the mystery elements and the character of Konrad, while criticizing the storytelling structure. Andrew Mathers, writing for A Quill to Live, described the book as "an ugly duckling", noting that it had an unusual narrative structure that was somewhat confusing but that the overarching narrative and characterizations were well written. He gave the book an overall score of 8.5/10.

The setting and characters were compared to The Witcher by some reviewers.
