= Richard Swan (author) =

English author

Swan in 2026

Richard Swan is an English author known for writing the Empire of the Wolf trilogy of fantasy novels. In 2025, he published Grave Empire, the first novel in the Great Silence trilogy, a new series of books set within the Empire of the Wolf universe. He wrote Infinite State, a dystopian science fiction novel set to be published by Tor Books in 2026. Swan also wrote the Art of War trilogy. He has also written works set within the Warhammer universe and published by Black Library.

Grave Empire was nominated for a 2026 British Fantasy Award in the Best Fantasy Novel category.
