= Frost/Nixon =

Frost/Nixon may refer to:

- Nixon interviews, a series of interviews between David Frost and Richard Nixon
- Frost/Nixon (play), a 2006 play written by Peter Morgan
- Frost/Nixon (film), a 2008 film adaptation of the play, directed by Ron Howard
