= The Demon Headmaster (1996 TV series) =

British television series (1996–1998)

- Genre: Science fiction Horror
- Created by: Gillian Cross
- Starring: Terrence Hardiman; Frances Amey; Gunnar Atli Cauthery; Thomas Szekeres
- Country of origin: United Kingdom
- No. of series: 3
- No. of episodes: 19

Production
- Running time: 25 minutes

Original release
- Network: BBC1
- Release: 2 January 1996 – 22 January 1998

The Demon Headmaster is a British television series based on the children's books of the same name by Gillian Cross. Made for CBBC, the drama was first broadcast between 1996 and 1998. The first series contained six episodes, and aired twice weekly from 2 to 18 January 1996, the second series contained seven episodes and aired weekly from 25 September to 6 November 1996, and the third series contained six episodes and aired twice weekly from 6 to 22 January 1998.

School location scenes in the first series were filmed at Hatch End High School, in Hatch End, Harrow, North West London and The Royal Masonic School for Girls in Rickmansworth, Hertfordshire. Other scenes were filmed around West London, and the Vulcan Tower is the building for Atrium in Uxbridge. CGI was used to make this building appear on a traffic island close to Warwick Avenue. Some scenes in the later series were filmed in the village of Sarratt, Hertfordshire and other locations in Hertfordshire and Buckinghamshire.

A direct sequel of the original series began airing on CBBC from 14 October 2019, with Nicholas Gleaves playing the titular character. It was confirmed on BBC Breakfast that this series was a continuation of the original.

== Relation to the books ==
The television show was based on four of The Demon Headmaster novels by Gillian Cross. The scripts were written by Helen Cresswell. The first three episodes of series one were adapted from the first book, The Demon Headmaster, and episodes 4–6 were adapted from the second book in the series, The Demon Headmaster and the Prime Minister's Brain.

The development of the subsequent stories was more unusual: the second television series was The Demon Headmaster Strikes Again, and the third was The Demon Headmaster Takes Over. Gillian Cross wrote the storylines for each project, and then wrote the books; Helen Cresswell turned the storylines into screenplays.

== Episodes ==
=== Series 1 (1996) ===
No. overall	No. in series	Title	Directed by	Written by	Original release date
1	1	"The Demon Headmaster (Look into my Eyes): Part 1"	Roger Singleton-Turner	Gillian Cross (novel) & Helen Cresswell (TV)	2 January 1996
2	2	"The Demon Headmaster (Look into my Eyes): Part 2"	Roger Singleton-Turner	Gillian Cross (novel) & Helen Cresswell (TV)	4 January 1996
3	3	"The Demon Headmaster (Look into my Eyes): Part 3"	Roger Singleton-Turner	Gillian Cross (novel) & Helen Cresswell (TV)	9 January 1996
4	4	"The Prime Minister's Brain: Part 1"	Roger Singleton-Turner	Gillian Cross (novel) & Helen Cresswell (TV)	11 January 1996
5	5	"The Prime Minister's Brain: Part 2"	Roger Singleton-Turner	Gillian Cross (novel) & Helen Cresswell (TV)	16 January 1996
6	6	"The Prime Minister's Brain: Part 3"	Roger Singleton-Turner	Gillian Cross (novel) & Helen Cresswell (TV)	18 January 1996

=== Series 2 (1996) ===
No. overall	No. in series	Title	Directed by	Written by	Original release date
7	1	"The Demon Headmaster Strikes Again: Part 1"	Roger Singleton-Turner	Gillian Cross (novel) & Helen Cresswell (TV)	25 September 1996
8	2	"The Demon Headmaster Strikes Again: Part 2"	Roger Singleton-Turner	Gillian Cross (novel) & Helen Cresswell (TV)	2 October 1996
9	3	"The Demon Headmaster Strikes Again: Part 3"	Roger Singleton-Turner	Gillian Cross (novel) & Helen Cresswell (TV)	9 October 1996
10	4	"The Demon Headmaster Strikes Again: Part 4"	Roger Singleton-Turner	Gillian Cross (novel) & Helen Cresswell (TV)	16 October 1996
11	5	"The Demon Headmaster Strikes Again: Part 5"	Roger Singleton-Turner	Gillian Cross (novel) & Helen Cresswell (TV)	23 October 1996
12	6	"The Demon Headmaster Strikes Again: Part 6"	Roger Singleton-Turner	Gillian Cross (novel) & Helen Cresswell (TV)	30 October 1996
13	7	"The Demon Headmaster Strikes Again: Part 7"	Roger Singleton-Turner	Gillian Cross (novel) & Helen Cresswell (TV)	6 November 1996

=== Series 3 (1998) ===
No. overall	No. in series	Title	Directed by	Written by	Original release date
14	1	"The Demon Headmaster Takes Over: Part 1"	Roger Singleton-Turner	Gillian Cross (novel) & Helen Cresswell (TV)	6 January 1998
15	2	"The Demon Headmaster Takes Over: Part 2"	Roger Singleton-Turner	Gillian Cross (novel) & Helen Cresswell (TV)	8 January 1998
16	3	"The Demon Headmaster Takes Over: Part 3"	Roger Singleton-Turner	Gillian Cross (novel) & Helen Cresswell (TV)	13 January 1998
17	4	"The Demon Headmaster Takes Over: Part 4"	Roger Singleton-Turner	Gillian Cross (novel) & Helen Cresswell (TV)	15 January 1998
18	5	"The Demon Headmaster Takes Over: Part 5"	Roger Singleton-Turner	Gillian Cross (novel) & Helen Cresswell (TV)	20 January 1998
19	6	"The Demon Headmaster Takes Over: Part 6"	Roger Singleton-Turner	Gillian Cross (novel) & Helen Cresswell (TV)	22 January 1998

== Storyline ==
=== Series 1 (Early 1996) ===
==== Part 1 – The Demon Headmaster (Episodes 1–3) ====
Note: Also sometimes known as Look Into My Eyes, though this title does not appear on the screen.

Dinah Glass moves in with the Hunter family and starts going to the same school as her foster brothers Lloyd and Harvey. It is not easy, as she finds the school strange, and her foster brothers seem to hate her. Pupils suddenly talk like robots and do unusual things, and even Dinah finds herself acting oddly. She is sure the headmaster has some kind of power over them, and is determined to find out more. But the Demon Headmaster is equally determined to stop her.

==== Part 2 – The Prime Minister's Brain (Episodes 4–6) ====
Octopus Dare is the new computer game at school – everyone is playing it, but only Dinah is any good at it. Soon, all she can think about is Octopus Dare. She wins a place at the grand final, and is delighted. But there is something strange about it all that scares Dinah, so her friends come with her to the final. Before long they find themselves in trouble, as the Computer Director turns out to be their old enemy, the Demon Headmaster.

=== Series 2 – The Demon Headmaster Strikes Again (Late 1996) ===
Dinah's father is headhunted for a new job at the Biogenetic Research Centre, but the Demon Headmaster is the director. This time, his lust for power sees him meddling with evolution itself; the Headmaster has created an Evolution Accelerator, for which he wants Dinah's DNA to create a "perfect" human, with Dinah's intellect but no emotions. He then puts Dinah into terrible danger to test his theories.

=== CBBC Pantomime – The Demon Headmaster Takes Over TV (1997) ===
On Christmas Day 1997, CBBC showed The Demon Headmaster Takes Over TV, a recorded version of the CBBC Pantomime, performed at the CBBC Big Bash in the National Exhibition Centre, Birmingham that year. Terrence Hardiman did not appear live during the show, appearing only as pre-recorded images on a video wall. Whilst the first two series have been repeated several times on television, this special was only shown once and has never been repeated. or made available as a DVD extra.

=== Series 3 – The Demon Headmaster Takes Over (1998) ===
Dinah and her brothers are pretty sure they are rid of the Demon Headmaster once and for all. When the army starts dismantling the biogenetic research centre, Dinah contacts Professor Claudia Rowe, who is an expert on biology and genetics at the nearby university. With Dinah's help, she saves some of the precious materials and they become friends. Then strange things start to happen.

Libraries start closing and their books are taken away. Telephones stop working, and there is no internet access. People start talking like robots, even Claudia Rowe, and more and more of them seem to be wearing strange badges. It all adds up to one thing: the Demon Headmaster must be back. Dinah's search leads her to the university where she finds he has taken over the artificial intelligence project and is developing a Hyperbrain, a computer with superhuman intelligence and the potential to control all information in the world. Both the Demon Headmaster and the newly-sentient Hyperbrain want Dinah for knowledge she possesses.

== Home media ==
=== VHS ===
Release name	Release date	Country	Classifaction	Publisher	Format	Language	Subtitles	Notes	REF
The Demon Headmaster Look Into My Eyes	5 January 1998	United Kingdom	PG	BBC	PAL	English	None	Re edited into the 70 minute long episode Series 1, Episodes 1–6	

=== DVD ===
Release name	Release date	Country	Classifaction	Publisher	Format	Region	Language	Subtitles	Notes	REF
BBC Classics – Demon Headmaster / Tom's Midnight Garden	2011	United Kingdom/Australia	U/G	BBC / Reader's Digest	PAL	2/4	English	None	Unlike the VHS version the DVD shows The Demon Headmaster uncut Series 1, Episodes 1–6	
The Demon Headmaster - The Complete Series	14 May 2018	UK & Ireland	PG	BBC / Simply Media	PAL	2	English	English	3 disc set	

== Cast ==
=== Series regulars ===
- Frances Amey as Dinah Glass (credited as Dinah Hunter from Series 1: Part 2) and Eve (Series 2, credited as Dinah/Eve for episodes in which both characters appear)
- Terrence Hardiman as The Demon Headmaster
- Gunnar Cauthery as Lloyd Hunter
- Thomas Szekeres as Harvey Hunter
- Anthony Cumber as Ian
- Kristy Bruce as Ingrid
- Rachael Goodyer as Mandy
- Tessa Peake-Jones as Mrs. Hunter
- Katey Crawford Kastin as Rose Carter (series 1/2)

=== Series 1 regulars ===
- Jake Curran as Jeff (episodes 1–3)
- Danny John-Jules as Eddy Hair (episodes 1/3)
- Florence Hoath as Bess (episodes 4–6)
- Andrea Berry as Camilla Jefferies (episodes 4–6)
- Danny Kanaber as Robert Jefferies (episodes 4–6)

=== Series 2 regulars ===
- James Richard as Simon James
- David Lloyd as Mr. Hunter
- David Baukham as Mr. James

=== Series 3 regulars ===
- Jay Barrymore as Michael Dexter
- Nina Young as Professor Claudia Rowe
- Richard Hope as Professor Tim Dexter
- Tony Osoba as Mr. Smith
- Alphonsia Emmanuel as the Voice of the Hyperbrain and the Hyperbrain Lady
- Natasha Lee as Kate

== Nomination ==
- Best Drama – BAFTA Children's Award 1997.
