= Jack Brennan =

American Marine Corps officer and political aide (1937–2023)

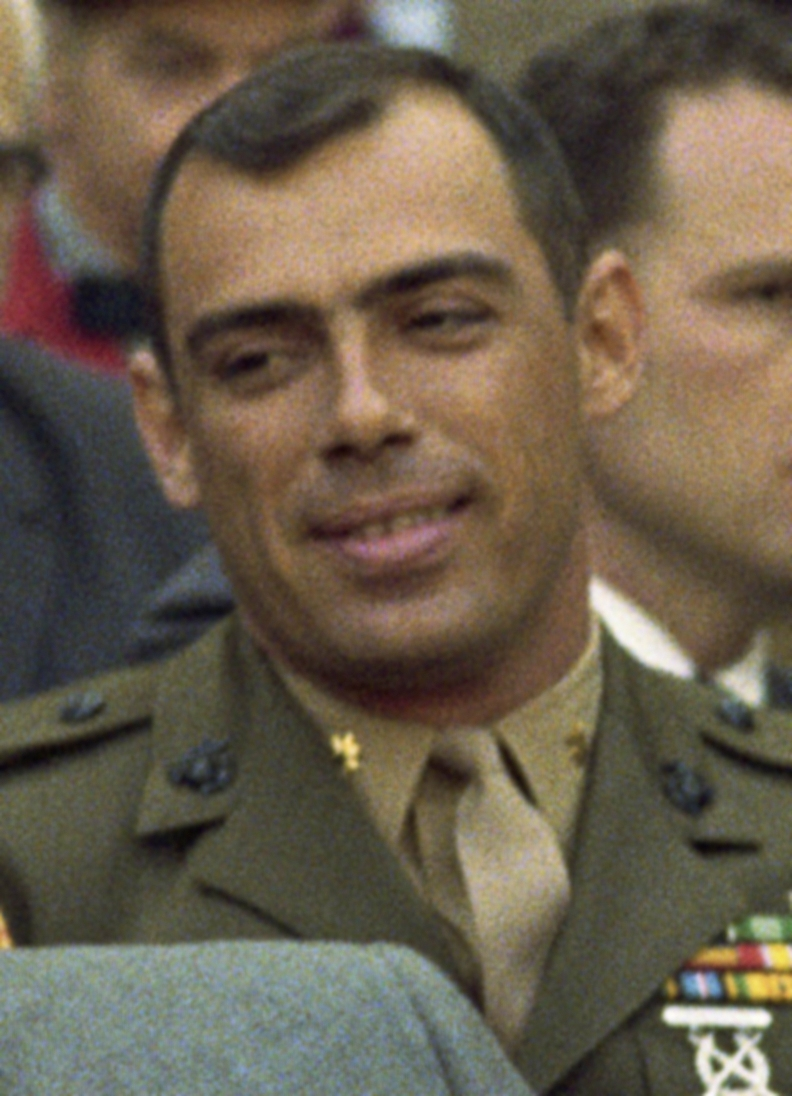
- Brennan in 1969
- Born: John Vincent Brennan; August 16, 1937; Fall River, Massachusetts, U.S.
- Died: October 20, 2023 (aged 86)
- Military career
- Allegiance: United States
- Branch: United States Marine Corps
- Service years: 1956–1975
- Rank: Colonel
- Nickname: "Jack"
- Conflicts: Vietnam War: Battle of Khe Sanh
- Awards: Bronze Star Medal; Purple Heart Medal; Presidential Service Badge

John Vincent Brennan (August 16, 1937 – October 20, 2023) was a United States Marine Corps officer and political aide. He is best known as being President Richard Nixon's post-resignation chief of staff.

== Early life and education ==
Brennan was born on August 16, 1937, in Fall River, Massachusetts, and attended Providence College, a Catholic college in Providence, Rhode Island, where he graduated in 1959. He served with the United States Marine Corps during the Vietnam War, where he earned a Bronze Star Medal and Purple Heart Medal at the Battle of Khe Sanh.

== Career ==
=== Marine Corps Aide to the President ===
In 1969, then-Major Brennan was appointed a Marine Corps Aide to President Nixon; during that time he rose to Colonel. During his time as Marine Corps Aide, Brennan accompanied Nixon on his historic trip to China in 1972, which opened up the country to the United States; he was the first Marine to set foot in the People's Republic of China, and he met Mao Zedong. He made a positive impression on Soviet General Secretary Leonid Brezhnev, who described Brennan as having "machismo." In addition, he met Pope Paul VI; he later said that, as a Catholic, it was a special honor for him. Brennan remained attached to Nixon during his resignation after the Watergate scandal in 1974; he was aboard the helicopter and airplane that flew the Nixon family back to their home state of California.

=== Nixon's Chief of Staff ===
When Nixon returned to La Casa Pacifica in San Clemente, California, nicknamed "The Western White House" during his administration, Brennan left the Marines and served as the ex-president's chief of staff. He originally refused the position after some of Nixon's associates made it sound like a business proposal; the financial aspect was not of interest to Brennan. However, after repeated requests from Nixon, Brennan agreed to leave his career of over 16 years and join the former president's staff. In the role of chief of staff, Brennan managed the small staff, appointments, mail and budgets, and was the liaison to the General Services Administration and members of the United States Congress who wanted information for any ongoing investigations from the former President's Administration. Due to the circumstances of Nixon's departure, he did not receive the level of information and courtesy offered to previous former presidents. During this period he was also Nixon's golfing partner and confidant.

During his time with the Nixons, Brennan helped the family with two major health crises: Richard Nixon suffered from a dangerous case of phlebitis in 1974, and former First Lady Pat Nixon suffered a stroke in 1976. Both recovered. When Bob Woodward and Carl Bernstein released their 1976 book, The Final Days, Brennan felt that it did not correspond with his own time with the former president, but he stated "as a fictitious novel, it reads well."

==== Role in Frost/Nixon interviews ====
While chief of staff, Brennan negotiated the 1977 Nixon Interviews with British journalist David Frost; the interviews paid Nixon $600,000, equal to approximately $2 million in 2009. Brennan was initially concerned because Frost had the right to edit the interview tapes however he wanted, and could thus edit them to change the focus of what was said and potentially make Nixon look bad; however, he was able to relax his concerns upon getting to know Frost. The initial 24 hours of recorded interviews did not go well for either side: Frost's side did not gain any new, meaningful information on the Watergate scandal, while Nixon's side realized they had not offered anything that would begin to repair his shattered reputation. Frost's producer, John Birt, approached Brennan about extending the interview. Brennan originally turned the idea down, but after discussing the situation with his staff, agreed that Nixon should voluntarily go further and that some expression of regret for Watergate needed to be put on record. Nixon himself was resistant to the idea. Brennan explained to him "if this ends the way it has, the world is going to say, there goes the same old Nixon." Nixon was eventually convinced to offer one more additional interviewing session; in the time in between, Brennan observed Nixon prepare himself for a difficult statement that would not be a confession or an admission of guilt, yet would express regret for what had happened. However, once the final interview began, Nixon became resistant again. Concerned that the interviews would again be disappointing, Brennan held up a hand-written notice to Frost that read "Let him talk." Frost misread the sign as "Let us talk" and called for a break. During the short interval, Nixon's team persuaded him to overcome his reticence and make a statement of regret; Frost, meanwhile, was persuaded to take a more sympathetic tone. On return from the break, Frost coaxed Nixon into conceding that he had "let the American people down." Frost's top researcher, Robert Zelnick, credited the moment to Nixon's staff.

The Nixon interviews drew the largest television audience for a political interview in history. Those interviews became the basis for a 2006 Tony Award-winning play, entitled Frost/Nixon, which itself was turned into a 2008 Academy Award-nominated movie of the same name. Brennan felt Frost's own book about the interviews, which served as writer Peter Morgan's basis for the play and movie, was "fairly accurate"; however, he felt Morgan's scripts were "a complete fiction" based on actual events.

Brennan was consulted for the film version. His input led the set designer to remove a bar from the Nixon house set; he also met with actor Kevin Bacon, who played him in the film (he was played by Corey Johnson in the original stage play). While accepting the film as a work of fiction, he was displeased with two particular aspects of the film: the film shows Nixon drunk at one point, and it showed him using more frequent and different profanity than the real Nixon used. He also noted that a scene in the film where he is portrayed threatening Frost over the phone if he got the facts wrong, never occurred and was made up by Morgan for dramatic purposes; however, he did warn Frost, in person over lunch, not to re-edit the footage to change the focus to make Nixon look bad. Journalist Diane Sawyer, who helped Nixon prepare for the interviews in 1977, noted that, unlike his portrayal as a stern military personality in the film, Brennan is "the funniest guy you ever met in your life, an irreverent, wonderful guy."

== Personal life and death ==
Brennan resided in Palm Springs, California, and spent summers in Little Compton, Rhode Island. He was a booster for the Providence College Friars and donated his papers from his work for Nixon to the school's archives. At his request, a Friars basketball jersey was placed in his office set in the film Frost/Nixon, but it was not visible in the film.

Brennan died on October 20, 2023, at the age of 86.

== Awards and decorations ==
Bronze Star with Valor device
Purple Heart
Army Commendation Medal
Combat Action Ribbon
Presidential Service Badge
