= The Demon Headmaster (2019 TV series) =

2019 television series

- Genre: Drama; Science fiction
- Created by: Emma Reeves
- Based on: The Demon Headmaster by Gillian Cross
- Starring: Nicholas Gleaves; Ellie Botterill; Jordan Cramond; Dijarn Campbell; Jordan Rankin; Kevin O'Loughlin; Sally Oliver; Shonagh Price
- Composer: Philip Curran
- Country of origin: United Kingdom
- Original language: English
- No. of seasons: 1
- No. of episodes: 10

Production
- Executive producer: Spencer Campbell
- Producer: Peter Gallagher
- Editor: Conor Meechan
- Running time: 25 minutes
- Production company: BBC Children's Productions

Original release
- Network: CBBC
- Release: 14 October – 16 December 2019

The Demon Headmaster is a British television series based on the children's books by Gillian Cross of the same title. Made by BBC Studios and Sinking Ship Entertainment for CBBC, the drama was first broadcast on 14 October 2019, and is the second adaptation of the books, following the 1996 series. Nicholas Gleaves plays the titular character, a mysterious head teacher with strange powers and dreams of world domination.

The series is a direct sequel of the original series, and features Charlotte Beckett and Sally Oliver as Dinah Hunter and Rose Carter, roles originally portrayed by Frances Amey and Kathryn Wyeth. Amey was approached to reprise the role of Dinah, though she no longer acts; whilst Wyeth was now based in Wellington, New Zealand. The original Headmaster Terrence Hardiman reprised his role for the revival.

It had been renewed for a second series, but this was delayed by the COVID-19 pandemic and later cancelled.

== Production ==
The series, adapted by Emma Reeves, is based on the newest series of books, beginning with Total Control (2017). These books focus on a new protagonist, Lizzie Warren, rather than Dinah Glass from the original books and series. The series was filmed on location in North Lanarkshire, Scotland.

Reeves pitched a second series to CBBC, using further elements of Total Control, as well as its sequel, Mortal Danger.

== Cast ==
- Nicholas Gleaves as The Headmaster
- Ellie Botterill as Lizzie Warren
- Jordan Cramond as Tyler Warren
- Dijarn Campbell as Ethan Prendergast / Adebayo
- Jordan Rankin as Blake Vinney
- Shonagh Price as Beata Maron
- Lori Stott as Angelika Maron
- Kevin O'Loughlin as Rick Warren
- Sally Oliver as Mary Warren/Rose Carter
- Lola Aluko as Becky Whittaker
- Jade Chan as Sophie Johnson
- Sarah Paul as Auntie Beryl
- Manjot Sumal as Mr Wasu
- Euan Mitchell as Jakub
- Charlotte Beckett as Dinah Hunter
- Jasmine De Goede as Young Dinah
- Terrence Hardiman as the Original Headmaster.

== Episodes ==
No.	Title	Directed by	Written by	Original release date
1	"everystudentastar"	John McKay	Emma Reeves	14 October 2019
Siblings Lizzie and Tyler Warren return, with little enthusiasm, to Hazelbrook School. Upon their return, however, the once disreputable school has become an in-demand one. If that was not weird enough, every student now has a special 'skill' they've been developing (such as sports or scientific mastery) and Hazelbrook is a centre of excellence under the watchful eye and strict rules of the 'Headmaster'. Lizzie suspects something is amiss, but then she is framed for defacing the school.
2	"The Best I Can Be!"	John McKay	Emma Reeves	21 October 2019
Under the Headmaster's spell, Lizzie becomes a martial arts star. However, football star Ethan Prendergast senses something is wrong too, and tries to break through to Lizzie. Her newfound energy and drive are channelled into the Hazelbrook Pioneers, where her desire to excel puts her brother, and their relationship, in peril.
3	"Science for Success!"	John McKay	Emma Reeves	28 October 2019
The school's science fair is coming up, and the Headmaster has invited the students' families to attend. Realising he intends to hypnotise them, Lizzie and Ethan enlist recent genius Sophie to help them counter his powers with sound.
4	"Control. Command. Conquer!"	John McKay	Emma Reeves	4 November 2019
Thanks to an old button in her purse, Angelika is freed from the Headmaster's control and is returned to her rebellious self. Now with a new ally, Lizzie and Ethan hatch a plan to learn what the Headmaster's grander scheme is. However, the Headmaster has increased security and surveillance with an army of drones.
5	"Be More Hazelbrook"	John McKay	Andrew Burrell	11 November 2019
The Headmaster goes on a trip with other key people from Hazelbrook, to look at other failing schools, which might be entitled to become part of the "Hazelbrook Chain". Lizzie, Ethan, Angelika and Tyler arrange for a reporter to come to the school. However, this reporter knew Mrs Maron in her old life, when she was a campaigner for human rights and other causes. With time running out, the gang must expose the Demon Headmaster's past life and stop him from taking over the world.
6	"Be Your True Self"	Johnathan Fox Bassett	Joseph Lidster	18 November 2019
The gang find clues that lead to the identity of the Headmaster being revealed. They visit a spooky old school where there is a picture of a scary-looking Headmaster and find a note from a mysterious "Dinah Hunter". The gang must follow the clues to ultimately help to unmask the Headmaster's true identity. Meanwhile, Blake joins forces with Tyler, to wreck the school play and to stop Manor Park School from joining the Hazelbrook Chain.
7	"Whatever it Takes"	Johnathan Fox Bassett	Emma Reeves	25 November 2019
As the gang learn more about Dinah Hunter, a mysterious new visitor, briefly posing as a teacher, arrives. Claiming to be the late Dinah, she offers to fill in the missing pieces about the Headmaster. She claims she can help fight him - but the gang do not know if they can trust her. Meanwhile, Tyler keeps trying to help Blake break free.
8	"Routine, Order, Restraint"	Johnathan Fox Bassett	Lucy Moore	2 December 2019
As Blake's desperation and rage leads to imprisoning the Headmaster in the basement, the gang try to take advantage of the situation and incite full rebellion at Hazelbrook. However, while they try to rouse the kids, the Headmaster has a devious contingency plan in place via the tablets he distributed to all the parents.
9	"The Making of You"	Johnathan Fox Bassett	Lucy Moore & Emma Reeves	9 December 2019
With Ethan reliving his parents' deaths and her mum revealed to be ex-student Rose, Lizzie is desperate. The Headmaster decides to show her his vision of a perfectly ordered future. Lizzie challenges this but is soon faced with a hard choice - she questions if the Headmaster's vision is actually the best way.
10	"Win-Day"	Johnathan Fox Bassett	Emma Reeves	16 December 2019
With the Prime Minister due to visit Hazelbrook, Lizzie must rally the gang and stop the Headmaster. But she must face her mistakes, and outsmart the Headmaster.
