= Chartbreak =

1986 novel by Gillian Cross

- First edition (publ. OUP)
- Author: Gillian Cross
- Language: English
- Publication date: 1986

Chartbreak is a 1986 novel by British author Gillian Cross.

== Plot ==
A girl called Janis Finch, known as "Finch", leaves home due to tension between her and her stepfather, and meets an unsigned rock band called Kelp in the cafe of a motorway service station. She joins the band and they achieve chart success, including an appearance on Top of the Pops for their single "Face It". The lead singer of the band is Christie Joyce, and the other members are Job, Dave and Rollo.

== A-level ==
The text was a source for OCR A-Level English Literature.
