= James Reston Jr. =

American writer (1941–2023)

- Born: March 8, 1941; New York City, U.S.
- Died: July 19, 2023 (aged 82); Chevy Chase, Maryland, U.S.
- Other name: Jim Reston
- Education: University of North Carolina at Chapel Hill (BA)
- Occupations: Author; journalist
- Parent(s): James Reston; Sally Fulton
- Website: www.restonbooks.com

James Barrett Reston Jr. (March 8, 1941 – July 19, 2023) was an American journalist, documentarian and author of political and historical fiction and non-fiction. He wrote about the Vietnam War, the Jonestown Massacre, civil rights, the impeachment of Richard Nixon, and the September 11 attacks.

== Early life ==
Reston was born in Manhattan, New York City. His father James "Scotty" Reston was an editor of the New York Times. His mother, Sarah Jane "Sally" Fulton, was a journalist, photographer, writer, and publisher who joined her husband on foreign assignments in Europe and Asia during World War II. His maternal grandfather, William J. Fulton, served two terms as the Chief Justice of the Supreme Court of Illinois.

Reston's family moved to Washington, D.C. when he was two years old. He attended the St. Albans School in Washington, D.C. He earned his B.A. in philosophy in 1963 at the University of North Carolina at Chapel Hill (UNC) while on a Morehead Scholarship. At UNC, he was an All-South soccer player and still retains the single-game scoring record for the university—five goals against North Carolina State University on October 18, 1962. He attended Oxford University during his junior year.

== Career ==
Reston was an assistant to and speechwriter for U.S. Secretary of the Interior Stewart Udall from 1964 to 1965. He was a reporter for the Chicago Daily News from 1964 to 1965. From 1965 to 1968, he served in the U.S. Army as an intelligence specialist and sergeant. From 1971 to 1981, he was a lecturer in creative writing at the University of North Carolina at Chapel Hill. From 1976 to 1977, he was a fiction reviewer for the Chronicle of Higher Education.

In the late 1960s and early 1970s, Reston wrote numerous pieces about amnesty for Vietnam deserters, people who had left the United States rather than serving in the war. This led to two books, both collections of essays, When Can I Come Home, in 1972 and The Amnesty of John David Herndon in 1973. Reston said, "Now as a veteran against the war, I gravitated to the issue of amnesty for Vietnam war resisters, no doubt because emotionally I sympathized deeply with their plight and their decision in contrast to my own course."

External videos
- Presentation by Reston on The Conviction of Richard Nixon, July 12, 2007, C-SPAN

From 1976 to 1977, Reston was David Frost's Watergate adviser for the historic Nixon interviews. Reston's book about the interviews, The Conviction of Richard Nixon, was the inspiration for Peter Morgan's 2006 play Frost/Nixon, in which the character Jim Reston is the narrator. It was made into a film in 2008, also called Frost/Nixon.

Reston's articles appeared in American Heritage, American Theatre, George, Esquire, National Geographic, The New York Times Book Review, The New York Times Magazine, The New Yorker, Omni, Playboy, Rolling Stone, Saturday Review, Time, Vanity Fair, and Washington Post Magazine.

His works of both fiction and non-fiction cover a wide range of historical and political topics. In 1985, Reston was the Newsweek, PBS, and BBC candidate to be the first writer in space on the NASA space shuttle. That program was scrapped after the Challenger accident in January 1986. On May 23, 1994, Time magazine published his cover story on the impact of the Shoemaker Levy 9 comet into Jupiter.

Reston wrote four plays which were all stage adaptations of his books —Sherman the Peacemaker premiered at the Playmakers Repertory Company in Chapel Hill, North Carolina, in 1979, and was an outgrowth of his book, Sherman's March and Vietnam; Jonestown Express, based on his 1981 book Our Father Who Art in Hell, premiered with the Trinity Square Repertory Company in 1982; Galileo's Torch was adapted from his biography of Galileo and Galileo: A Life was staged in seven separate productions between 2014 and 2017; and Luther's Trumpet is an adaptation of his 2016 book, Luther's Fortress, and premiered in September 2018.

In 2005, Reston tried to stop production of Ridley Scott's film Kingdom of Heaven, claiming half of the script was based on the first part of his book Warriors of God. Reston's book was previously optioned by Phoenix Pictures, who had unsuccessfully pitched the concept to Scott as a potential project. Reston said, "They have built this film on the back of my intellectual property. They just read the first hundred pages and saw it has these great characters and a fantastic battle."

In 2016, Reston's 1977 book, The Innocence of Joan Little: A Southern Mystery, was optioned by Paulist Productions to possibly develop as a limited series.

Reston was a Guest Scholar at the Woodrow Wilson International Center for Scholars in Washington D.C., from 1994 to 1995, and a Global Fellow from October 2002 to December 2022. He was also fellow at the American Academy in Rome. In 2011, he was a resident scholar at the Kluge Center at the Library of Congress.

== Professional affiliations ==
Reston was a member of the Authors Guild, the Authors League of America, the Dramatists Guild of America, and PEN.

== Personal life ==
Reston married Denise Brender Leary on June 12, 1971, in Hume, Virginia, at Fiery Run, the Restons' cabin. She received a law degree from Duke University and is the daughter of Mr. and Mrs. John Milton Leary of the Bronx. They lived in Chevy Chase, Maryland, and had three children: Maeve, Hillary Reston, and Devin. As of 2017, Reston lived at Martha's Vineyard.

External videos
- Interview with Reston on Fragile Innocence, September 30, 2006, C-SPAN

Reston's book Fragile Innocence, A Father's Memoir of His Daughter's Courageous Journey (2006) is the story of his daughter Hillary's experience with a debilitative viral brain infection.

James Reston Jr. died from pancreatic cancer in Chevy Chase, Maryland, on July 19, 2023, at age 82.

== Awards ==
In 1983, Reston received the Prix Italia and the Dupont–Columbia Award for radio documentary Father Cares: the Last of Jonestown on NPR. He received the Valley Forge Award for Sherman's March and Vietnam in 1985.

== In popular culture ==
Reston's book The Conviction of Richard Nixon was developed into a play, Frost/Nixon that was, in turn, developed into a film with the same title. Reston is depicted in the 2008 film Frost/Nixon by Sam Rockwell.

Reston developed a theory that Lee Harvey Oswald's target was Texas Governor John Connally, not President John F. Kennedy.

== Publications ==
=== Novels ===
- To Defend, to Destroy (1971) ISBN 978-0393086218
- The Knock at Midnight (1975) ISBN 978-0393087109
- The 19th Hijacker: A Novel of 9/11, 2021 ISBN 978-1645720201

=== Nonfiction books ===
External videos
- Booknotes interview with Reston on The Lone Star, December 17, 1989, C-SPAN
- Presentation by Reston on The Last Apocalypse, March 11, 1999, C-SPAN
- Presentation by Reston on Warriors of God, June 14, 2001, C-SPAN
- Presentation by Reston on Dogs of God, October 11, 2005, C-SPAN
- Presentation by Reston on Defenders of the Faith, May 15, 2010, C-SPAN

- When Can I Come Home (1972)
- The Amnesty of John David Herndon (1973) ISBN 978-0070519206
- Perfectly Clear: Nixon from Whittier to Watergate, Quadrangle (1973) ISBN 978-0812904055
- The Innocence of Joan Little: A Southern Mystery (1977), ISBN 978-0812907148
- Our Father Who Art in Hell: The Life and Death of Jim Jones (1981) ISBN 978-0595167432
- Sherman's March and Vietnam (1985) ISBN 978-0595167432
- The Lone Star: The Life of John Connally (1989) ISBN 978-0060161965
- Collision at Home Plate: The Lives of Pete Rose and Bart Giamatti (1991) ISBN 978-0803289642
- Galileo: A Life (1994) ISBN 978-1893122628
- The Last Apocalypse: Europe in the Year 1000 A.D. (1998) ISBN 978-0385483360
- Warriors of God: Richard the Lionheart and Saladin in the Third Crusade (2001) ISBN 978-0385495622
- Dogs of God: Columbus, the Inquisition, and the Defeat of the Moors (2005) ISBN 978-1400031917
- Fragile Innocence: A Father's Memoir of His Daughter's Courageous Journey (2006) ISBN 978-1400082445
- The Conviction of Richard Nixon: The Untold Story of the Frost/Nixon Interviews (2007) ISBN 978-0307394903
- Defenders of the Faith: Charles V, Suleyman the Magnificent, and the Battle for Europe, 1520–1536 (2009) ISBN 978-1594202254
- The Accidental Victim: JFK, Lee Harvey Oswald, and the Real Target in Dallas (2013) ISBN 978-1624908705
- Luther's Fortress: Martin Luther and His Reformation Under Siege (2015) ISBN 978-1481531696
- A Rift in the Earth: Art, Memory, and the Fight for a Vietnam War Memorial (2017) ISBN 978-1628728569
- The Impeachment Diary: Eyewitness to the Removal of a President (2019). ISBN 978-1950691180

=== Plays ===
- Sherman, the Peacemaker: A Play in Two Acts (1979)
- Jonestown Express, a play (1984)
- Galileo's Torch (2014)
- Luther's Trumpet (2018)

=== Radio ===
- "Father Cares: The Last of Jonestown" (NPR, 1981)
- "Bush Administration Misuses the Word 'Caliphate'" (NPR, 2005)
- "Political Stem-Cell Debate Delays Medical Progress" (NPR, 2006)
- "Impeachment: The View from 1974" (NPR, 2019)

=== Television ===
- 88 Seconds in Greensboro (PBS Frontline, 1983)
- The Real Stuff (PBS Frontline,1987)
- The Mission of Discovery (PBS Frontline, 1988)
- Betting on the Lottery (PBS Frontline,1990)

=== Articles ===
- "Vietnamize at Home", The New York Times (April 10, 1971)
- "Is Nuremberg Coming Back to Haunt Us?" The Saturday Review (July 18, 1970)
- "Universal Amnesty", New Republic (February 5, 1972)
- "Needed: A Grand Reconciliation: Not a Determination of Who Was More Moral on the War." Newsday (September 3, 1974)
- "Limited Amnesty: Not Easy: The President Gave Himself a Difficult Job" The New York Times (September 8, 1974)
- "Real Amnesty Would be Good for America" Newsday (March 31, 1975)
- "The Joan Little Case." The New York Times Magazine (April 6, 1975)
- "On Carter's Amnesty and Pardon Views" The New York Times (October 2, 1976)
- "Southern Justice and the Case of Joan Little" The New York Times (January 6, 1978)
- "The Breaking of Richard Nixon" Playboy (April 1978)
- "The Jonestown Papers." (Cover story). New Republic. (April 25, 1981)
- "Opinion: Meet the Program Past." The New York Times (June 27, 1981)
- "Reagan and Monroe." The New York Times (March 14, 1982)
- "A Matter of Honor," The New York Times (April 7, 1982)
- "Mission to a Mind" OMNI (1984)
- "Invitation to a Poisoning," Vanity Fair (February 1985)
- "United States Commission on Civil Rights: We Shall Undermine." Rolling Stone (March 13, 1986)
- "Collision Course." (Cover Story) Time (May 23, 1994)
- "The Persistence of Guilt. American Theatre. (January 1995)
- "The Monument Glut. The New York Times Magazine. (September 10, 1995)
- "Orion: Where Stars Are Born." National Geographic. (December 1995)
- "Opinion: Failing the 1869 Test." The New York Times (January 9, 1999)
- "Be Christina or Die." Christian History (1999)
- "Frost, Nixon, and Me." Smithsonian.(January 2009)
- "A Prophet in His Time." American Theatre (March 2002)
- "When Generosity Is Medically Necessary." The New York Times. (August 7, 2002)
- "Jesse James and Me." Smithsonian (October 2007)
- "Pointed Questions." Wilson Quarterly. (2012)
- "Correcting JFK Mythology on his Death" USA Today (November 13, 2013)
- "Induct Pete Rose into Hall of Fame: Column" USA Today (March 27, 2014)
- "Opinion: Martin Luther King Jr.'s Three Southern Villains." Newsweek (February 15, 2015)
- "Clark and Pritchett: A Comparison of Two Notorious Southern Lawmen." Southern Cultures (Winter 2016)
- "The Novelist's Event: Fact, Fiction, and a Writer's Search for a Universal Subject." Georgia Review (2018)
- "Opinion: Another Impeachable Offense." The New York Times. (May 6, 2019)
- "'To Heal a Nation': Creating the Vietnam Wall" American Heritage (June 2021)
- "Remembering Flight 93: 'Okay. Let's Roll'" American Heritage. (September/October 2021)
