= Frost/Nixon (play) =

2006 play by Peter Morgan

- Original poster
- Original language: English
- Written by: Peter Morgan
- Characters: David Frost; Richard Nixon
- Subject: The Frost/Nixon interviews
- Genre: Drama

Premiere
- Date: 2006
- Place: Donmar Warehouse, London

Frost/Nixon is a 2006 British historical play by Peter Morgan. The play is based on a series of controversial televised interviews granted by former U.S. president Richard Nixon to English broadcaster David Frost in 1977. The interviews focused on Nixon's administration, including his role in the Watergate scandal that ultimately led to his resignation as president.

== Performance history ==
The play premiered at the Donmar Warehouse theatre in London in August 2006, directed by Michael Grandage and starring Michael Sheen as the talk-show host and Frank Langella as the former president. Frost/Nixon received enthusiastic reviews in the British press. It then played at the Gielgud Theatre in London's West End, again starring Langella and Sheen.

On March 31, 2007, the play began previews on Broadway. It officially opened as a limited engagement at the Bernard B. Jacobs Theatre on April 22 and closed on August 19, after 137 performances. The cast included Langella, Sheen, Remy Auberjonois (John Birt), Shira Gregory (Evonne Goolagong), Corey Johnson (Jack Brennan), Stephen Kunken (James Reston Jr.), Stephen Rowe (Swifty Lazar/Mike Wallace), Triney Sandoval (Manolo Sanchez), Armand Schultz (Bob Zelnick) and Sonya Walger (Caroline Cushing).

TimeLine Theatre Company in Chicago ran the play from August 21 to October 10, 2010.

== Awards and nominations ==
=== Original Broadway production ===
| Year | Award ceremony | Category | Nominee | Result |
|---|---|---|---|---|
| 2007 | Tony Award | Best Play | | Nominated |
| 2007 | Tony Award | Best Performance by a Leading Actor in a Play | Frank Langella | Won |
| 2007 | Tony Award | Best Direction of a Play | Michael Grandage | Nominated |
| 2007 | Drama Desk Award | Outstanding Play | Peter Morgan | Nominated |
| 2007 | Drama Desk Award | Outstanding Actor in a Play | Frank Langella | Won |
| 2007 | Drama Desk Award | Outstanding Director of a Play | Michael Grandage | Nominated |
| 2007 | Drama Desk Award | Outstanding Music in a Play | Adam Cork | Nominated |
| 2007 | Outer Critics Circle Award | Outstanding New Play | | Nominated |
| 2007 | Outer Critics Circle Award | Outstanding Actor in a Play | Frank Langella | Won |
| 2007 | Outer Critics Circle Award | Outstanding Featured Actor in a Play | Stephen Kunken | Nominated |
| 2007 | Outer Critics Circle Award | Outstanding Director of a Play | Michael Grandage | Nominated |
| 2007 | Outer Critics Circle Award | Outstanding Lighting Design | Neil Austin | Nominated |
| 2007 | Drama League Award | Distinguished Production of a Play | | Nominated |

== Feature film ==
Ron Howard directed a 2008 film adaptation of the play. The film was produced by Imagine Entertainment and Working Title Films for Universal Pictures. Shooting began on August 27, 2007. Langella and Sheen reprised their roles for the film.
