= Wolf (novel) =

1990 young adult novel by Gillian Cross

- First edition cover with medal seal
- Author: Gillian Cross
- Language: English
- Genre: Young-adult novel, horror fiction
- Publisher: Oxford University Press
- Publication date: 1990
- Publication place: United Kingdom
- Media type: Print (hardcover, paperback)
- Pages: 140 pp (first edition)
- ISBN: 978-0-19-271633-0
- OCLC: 26931807
- LC Class: PZ7.C88253 Wo 1990

Wolf is a young-adult novel by Gillian Cross, published by Oxford in 1990. Set in London, it features communal living, terrorism, and wolves (according to Library of Congress Subject Headings) and a teenage girl in relation to her mother, father, and paternal grandmother.

Cross won the annual Carnegie Medal recognising the year's best children's book by a British subject. Coincidentally, The Cry of the Wolf by Melvin Burgess, featuring a grey wolf as the main character, was the highly commended runner up.

Holiday House published the first U.S. edition in 1991.

== Plot summary ==
Cassey is a teen-age girl who lives with her nan. Her nan and her mother both maintain silence about her father. One night she is awakened by mysterious footsteps. The next day, as always when the footsteps are heard, she is sent away to live with her lovely but feckless mother, Goldie, who is squatting in London. Mother, her partner, and his teenage son "make a living with innovative programs for schools: combinations of fact and fiction, drama and story, skillfully blended to challenge stereotypes and spark original thinking." Now they are producing a play about wolves, and they encourage Cassey to become involved. Cassey does her best to adjust to the new way of life, which is challenging in several ways. She cannot escape a sense of dread, a feeling that she is being stalked. Her nightmare is Red Riding Hood "recast by her own fears". Eventually she learns the secret she has been protected from all her life: her father is a notorious terrorist, a bomber in the Irish Republican Army.

== See also ==
- Homelessness in England
- Wolves in fiction (list of works)

Awards
Preceded by Goggle-Eyes	Carnegie Medal recipient 1990	Succeeded by Dear Nobody
