= David Frost's interviews with Richard Nixon =

1977 interviews of Richard Nixon by David Frost

- Presented by: David Frost
- Country of origin: United States
- No. of episodes: 5

Original release
- Release: May 4 – September 10, 1977

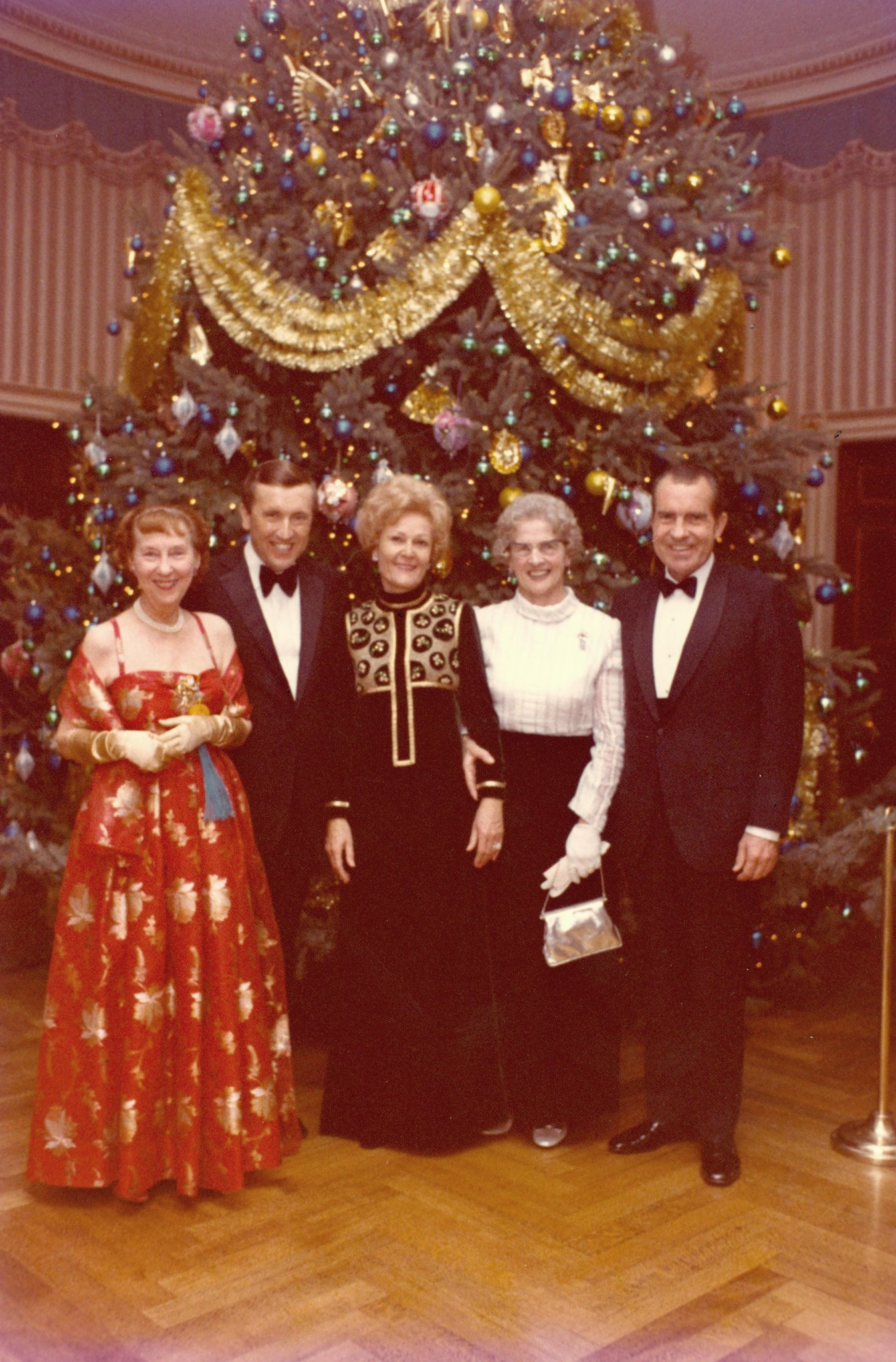
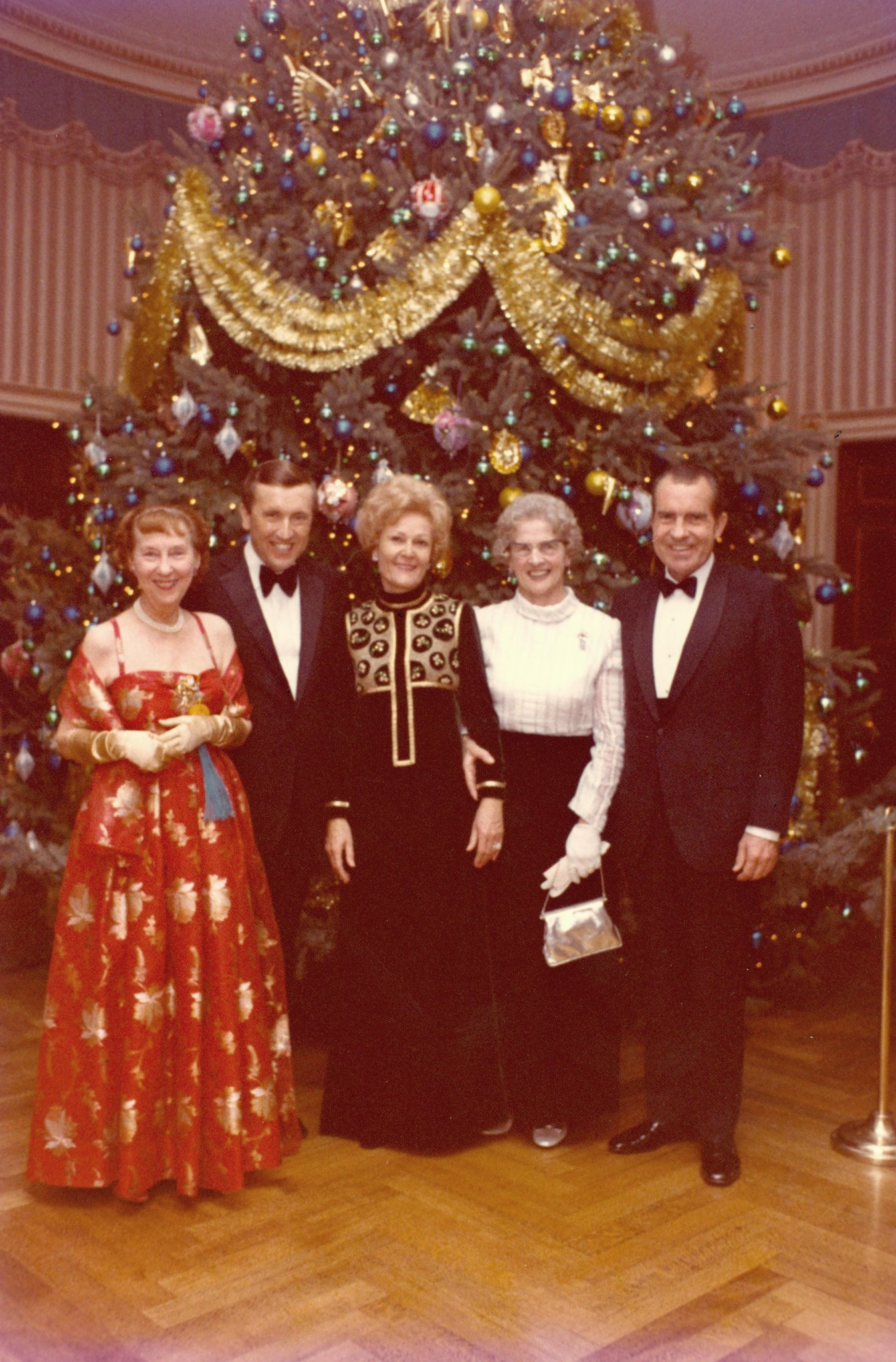
David Frost and Richard Nixon in 1970

The Nixon interviews were a series of conversations between former American president Richard Nixon and British journalist David Frost, produced by John Birt. They were recorded and broadcast on television and radio in four programs in 1977. The interviews later became the central subject of Peter Morgan's play Frost/Nixon in 2006.

== Background ==
Richard Nixon spent more than two years away from public life after resigning from office due to the Watergate scandal. However, Nixon granted David Frost an exclusive series of interviews in 1977. He was publishing his memoirs at the time, but his publicist Irving Paul Lazar believed that he could reach a mass audience by using television. Frost's New York–based talk show had been canceled some years earlier. Frost had agreed to pay Nixon for the interviews but the American television network news operations were not interested, regarding them as checkbook journalism. They refused to distribute the program and Frost was forced to fund the project himself while seeking other investors, who eventually bought air time and syndicated the four programs. The interviews were also broadcast on radio by the Mutual Broadcasting System.

Nixon's chief of staff Jack Brennan negotiated the terms of the interview with Frost. Nixon's staff saw the interview as an opportunity for him to restore his reputation with the public and assumed that Frost would be easily outwitted. He had interviewed Nixon in 1968 in a manner that Time magazine described as "softly". Frost recruited author and intelligence officer James Reston Jr. (Note: Multiple sources:) and ABC News producer Bob Zelnick to evaluate the Watergate details prior to the interview. Nixon's negotiated fee was $600,000 (equivalent to $3,200,000 in 2025) and a 20% share of any profits.

== Interviews ==
The 12 interviews began on March 23, 1977, with three interviews per week over four weeks. They were taped for more than two hours a day on Mondays, Wednesdays, and Fridays, for a total of 28 hours and 45 minutes. The interviews were managed by executive producer Marvin Minoff who was the president of Frost's David Paradine Productions, and by British current affairs producer John Birt. Recording took place at a seaside home in Monarch Bay, California owned by Harold H. Smith, a longtime Nixon supporter. This location was chosen instead of Nixon's San Clemente home La Casa Pacifica due to interference with the television relay equipment from Coast Guard navigational transmitters near San Clemente. Frost rented the Smith home for $6,000 on a part-time basis.

== Broadcasts ==
The interviews were broadcast in the US and some other countries in 1977. They were directed by Jorn Winther and edited into four programs, each 90 minutes long. In addition to being televised, the interviews were heard over radio via the Mutual Broadcasting System.

On Sunday evening May 1, 1977, CBS's 60 Minutes broadcast an interview of David Frost by Mike Wallace. This was the same network that Frost had "scooped" (CBS had negotiated to interview Nixon, but unlike the news organization, Frost was willing to pay for the sessions). Frost talked about looking forward to Nixon's "cascade of candour."

The interviews were broadcast in four parts, with a fifth part containing material edited from the earlier parts broadcast months later:

Part	Broadcast	Content
Part 1	May 4, 1977	Watergate
Part 2	May 12, 1977	Nixon and the world
Part 3	May 19, 1977	War at home and abroad
Part 4	May 26, 1977	Nixon, the man
Part 5	September 10, 1977	additional material from parts 1–4

The premiere episode drew 45 million viewers, the largest television audience for a political interview.

Part 5 opened with Frost's blunt question, "Why didn't you burn the tapes?"

== Aftermath ==
A Gallup poll conducted after the interviews aired showed that 69 percent of the public thought that Nixon was still trying to cover up, 72 percent still thought he was guilty of obstruction of justice, and 75 percent thought he deserved no further role in public life. Frost was expected to make $1 million from the interviews.

== DVD releases ==
There have been several releases on DVD featuring different edited presentations of the Interviews, the first of which is generally focused on clips from the first segment on Watergate with additional commentary, whereas the extended release features the "complete" interviews in the original four (and the later fifth) segments just as they were broadcast in 1977. In particular, footage from the Frost/Nixon interviews were included on the 2009 DVD release of Frost/Nixon, which presented a dramatized re-creation of the interviews and the events surrounding them; the reverse of the keep case explains that the footage was included primarily for the sake of comparing it to the film's depiction. However, it is still unclear whether or not the (more than 20 hours of) tape cut from all the publicly released editions will ever be made available to the public.

- 1 disc edition, 85 minutes ("Frost/Nixon: The Watergate Interviews")
- 2 disc edition, 377 minutes ("Frost/Nixon: The Complete Interviews")
