= Tightrope (novel) =

1999 novel by Gillian Cross

First edition (publ. OUP)

Tightrope is a children's novel by Gillian Cross. It was shortlisted for the Carnegie Medal.

Tightrope is about a teen girl named Ashley who has good grades and aids her sick mother through the day. However, Ashley also has another identity using the pseudonym 'Cindy' under which she often sneaks out and graffiti's her name on large city walls. Ashley uses her secret identity 'Cindy' as an escape from her complicated home life. However, someone discovers her secret and is leaving upsetting letters and animal remains in her backyard. Ashley wonders if she will ever be able to live normal life again and due to her fears, she feels that she won't live a happy life.
