= Gillian Cross =

British children's novelist (born 1945)

- Born: Gillian Clare Arnold; 24 December 1945 (age 80)
- Education: North London Collegiate School; Somerville College, Oxford (BA, 1969; MA, 1972); University of Sussex (Ph.D., 1974)
- Occupation: author
- Spouse: Martin Cross (m. 1967)
- Children: 4
- Writing career
- Genre: children's books
- Notable works: The Demon Headmaster (1982–2019); Chartbreak (1986); Wolf (1990); The Great Elephant Chase (1992); Tightrope (1999)
- Notable awards: Carnegie Medal (1990)

Gillian Claire Cross (born 24 December 1945) is a British author of children's books. She won the 1990 Carnegie Medal for Wolf and the 1992 Whitbread Children's Book Award for The Great Elephant Chase. She also wrote The Demon Headmaster book series, which was later turned into a television series by the BBC in January 1996; a sequel series was produced in 2019.

== Personal life and education ==
Gillian Clare Arnold was born in London on 24 December 1945 to James Eric and Joan Emma Arnold. As a girl, she attended the North London Collegiate School. She married Martin Cross on 10 May 1967.

Later, she received a Bachelor of Arts with first-class honours from Somerville College, Oxford in 1969, and a Master of Arts from the same university in 1972. In 1974, she received a Doctor of Philosophy degree from the University of Sussex.

Cross and her husband had four children.

== Career ==
In 1979, Cross's first book, The Runaway, was published. Three years later, she wrote the first of The Demon Headmaster series of eight books (1982 to 2019). The same year, she also completed The Dark Behind the Curtain, a horror story illustrated by David Parkins and published by Oxford University Press. It was highly commended for the 1982 Carnegie Medal (Note: Cross was also a commended runner up twice, for Chartbreak (1986) and The Great Elephant Chase (1992). • Since 1995 there are usually eight books on the Carnegie shortlist. According to CCSU, some runners up through 2002 were Commended (from 1954) or Highly Commended (from 1966). The latter distinction was approximately annual from 1979, with 29 in 24 years including Cross alone in 1982 and three in 1988. • No one has won three Carnegie Medals (awarded for 1936 to 2011 publications). Seven authors have won two. Among the dozens to win one, Cross and Melvin Burgess also wrote two Highly Commended books (1966–2002). (Burgess was a runner up for The Cry of the Wolf when Cross won the medal for Wolf.)) from the Library Association, recognising the year's best children's book by a British subject. A Map of Nowhere, published in 1988, was highly commended for the 1988 Carnegie. Two years later, she won the medal for Wolf, which was also runner-up for the 1991 Guardian Children's Fiction Prize.

In early 2014, she became a patron for the Leamington Spa-based charity Cord, after their work in Sudan inspired her latest novel, After Tomorrow.

In the 2024 Dorset Council election, Cross contested Beacon ward as a Labour Party candidate.

== Awards and honours ==
Three of Cross's books are Junior Library Guild selections: The Great American Elephant Chase (1995), New World (1995), and Pictures in the Dark (1997).

In 1987, The Horn Book Magazine has included two of Cross's books on their list of the best fiction of the year: Roscoe’s Leap (1987) and The Great American Elephant Chase (1993).

Awards for Cross's writing
Year	Title	Award	Result	Ref.
1980	The Iron Way	Guardian Children's Fiction Prize	Runner-up	
1982	The Dark Behind the Curtain	Carnegie Medal	Highly commended	
1983	The Dark Behind the Curtain	Guardian Children's Fiction Prize	Runner-up	
1984	On the Edge	Best Books for Young Adults	Selection	
1988	A Map of Nowhere	Carnegie Medal	Highly commended	
1990	Wolf	Carnegie Medal	Winner	
1991	Wolf	Guardian Children's Fiction Prize	Runner-up	
1992	The Great Elephant Chase	Nestlé Smarties Book Prize for 9 – 11 Years	Winner	
1992	The Great Elephant Chase	Nestlé Smarties Book Prize for Overall	Winner	
1992	The Great Elephant Chase	Whitbread Award for Children's Novel	Winner	
1999	Tightrope	Carnegie Medal	Shortlist	
2001	Tightrope	Best Books for Young Adults	Selection	
2011	Where I Belong	Carnegie Medal	Nominee	
2013	After Tomorrow	Guardian Children's Fiction Prize	Longlist	
2014	After Tomorrow	Bolton Children's Book Award	Winner	
2014	After Tomorrow	Carnegie Medal	Nominee	
2014	After Tomorrow	Coventry Inspiration Book Award	Winner	
2014	After Tomorrow	Little Rebels Children's Book Award	Winner	

== Bibliography ==
- The Runaway (1979)
- The Iron Way (1979)
- Revolt at Ratcliffe's Rags (1980)
- A Whisper of Lace (1981)
- Save Our School (1981)
- The Dark Behind the Curtain (1982)
- The Demon Headmaster series:
  1. The Demon Headmaster (1982)
  2. The Prime Minister's Brain (1985)
  3. The Revenge of the Demon Headmaster (1994)
  4. The Demon Headmaster Strikes Again (1996)
  5. The Demon Headmaster Takes Over (1997)
  6. Facing the Demon Headmaster (2002)
  7. Total Control (2017)
  8. Mortal Danger (2019)
- Born of the Sun (1983)
- The Mintyglo Kid (1983)
- On the Edge (1984)
- Swimathon! (1986)
- Chartbreak (1986); US title, Chartbreaker
- Roscoe's Leap (1987)
- A Map of Nowhere (1988)
- Rescuing Gloria (1989)
- Wolf (1990)
- The Monster from Underground (1990)
- Twin and Super-Twin (1990)
- Gobbo the Great (1991)
- Rent-a-Genius (1991)
- The Great Elephant Chase (1992); US title, The Great American Elephant Chase
- The Tree House (1993)
- The Furry Maccaloo (1993)
- Beware Olga! (1993)
- What Will Emily Do? (1994)
- New World (1994)
- The Crazy Shoe Shuffle (1995)
- Posh Watson (1995)
- Pictures in the Dark (1996)
- The Roman Beanfeast (1996)
- The Goose Girl (1998)
- Tightrope (1999)
- Down with the Dirty Danes! (2000)
- Calling a Dead Man (2001); US title, Phoning a Dead Man
- The Treasure in the Mud (2001)
- Dark Ground trilogy, or The Lost trilogy:
  1. The Dark Ground (2003)
  2. The Black Room (2005)
  3. The Nightmare Game (2006)
- Sam Sorts It Out (2005)
- Brother Aelred's Feet (2007)
- Where I Belong (2010)
- Cave Wars (2011)
- The Odyssey (Note: An illustrated retelling.) (2012)
- After Tomorrow (2013)
- The Cupcake Wars (2013)
- The Monster Snowman (2013)
- Mozart's Banana (2014)
- The Mystery of the Man with the Black Beard (2014)
- The Iliad (Note: An illustrated retelling.) (2015)
- Shadow Cat (2015)
- Amber's Song (2016)
- Changing Shape (2016)
- Film Crew (2017)
- Jason Banks and the Pumpkin of Doom (2018)
- Ghost Tower (2019)
- Five Ways to Make a Friend (2020)
