= The Great Elephant Chase =

1992 book children's novel by Gillian Cross

- First edition cover
- Author: Gillian Cross
- Language: English
- Genre: Children's historical fictionw
- Publisher: Oxford University Press
- Publication date: 1992
- Publication place: United Kingdom
- Media type: Print
- Pages: 193
- Awards: Whitbread Children's Book Award; Nestlé Smarties Book Prize
- ISBN: 978-0-19-271672-9
- OCLC: 473575350
- Website: Elephant

The Great Elephant Chase is a 1992 book children's novel by British author Gillian Cross. It won the Nestlé Smarties Book Prize and the Whitbread Children's Book Award. It takes place in 1881 and follows the adventures of teenagers Tad and Cissie as they travel across America with Khush the elephant. The book is mainly written in third person narrative from Tad's point of view, but also contains epistolary segments, consisting of letters from Cissie to her friend Ketty, towards whose home they are travelling.

The novel was published in the United States as The Great American Elephant Chase by Holiday House.

== Plot summary ==
Tad Hawkins is 15 years old and lives in the fictional Pennsylvania mining town of Markle. After his mother died in childbirth, he was taken in by his overbearing aunt, who treats him as an unpaid servant, existing only to be bossed around and humiliated by Mr Jackson, the lodger, and Esther, the hired help. Tad's life is changed when he gets caught up in a crowd on their way to see a travelling elephant show which has just arrived in town. After witnessing the "miracle cure" of a young crippled girl by the elephant keeper, he spots Esther and Mr Jackson in the crowd and hides in the elephant's trailer. Before he can escape, Khush, the elephant, is loaded into the trailer and Tad is on his way to another town. When Tad is discovered by Michael Keenan, the elephant keeper, he discovers that the cripple who was cured in Markle is in fact Keenan's younger daughter, Cissie. Keenan offers Tad a job looking after Khush to keep him from exposing the scam. Tad takes to life with Khush and the Keenans. However, Tad is not the only person to have discovered the scam. Mr Jackson and Esther are on the Keenans' tail.

A train crash kills Keenan and his eldest daughter, Olivia, on the way to Pittsburgh. Mr Jackson arrives, brandishing papers to prove that Keenan sold Khush to him for $500. Cissie, the only surviving Keenan, insists that the papers were faked and that Khush belongs to her. She, Tad and Khush set off on a journey West, towards the Nebraskan home of a friend from the travelling show, Ketty, with Mr Jackson and Esther in hot pursuit. A kind old widower helps them on their way by disguising Cissie as a boy and giving them a boat in which to sail down the Ohio River with Khush.

Khush does not take kindly to his confined quarters on the small flatboat and, a few days into their journey, pitches himself and Tad into the river. On being reunited with them, Cissie begins to reveal her heartache over the deaths of her father and sister. The three travellers find rest in a small religious community who have heard of Mr Jackson's claim of ownership. The group's elders agree to take Tad, Cissie and the elephant to the large port of Cairo if Khush shows that he wants to go with the two youths. Khush follows them into the hold of the coal barge and so they carry on along the river.

However, Khush again becomes impatient of his dark, cramped surroundings rocks the barge, forcing the Captain to make them disembark 200 miles from Cairo. After walking most of the way to the port, Tad leaves Cissie and the elephant to rest and continues ahead by himself. In Cairo, he is caught by Mr Jackson and Esther, who ply him for information and trick him into leading them to where Cissie and Khush should have been. Luckily, Cissie and the elephant have already left, spurred on by the thought of seeing Ketty in Nebraska. Tad stalls Mr Jackson and Esther and hurries to try and catch up with his friends.

Cissie secures passage for herself and Khush on a large boat and Tad, hiding on their pursuers' boat, is helped along his way by a friendly woman travelling in the same direction. When Tad sees a sign on the riverbank that Cissie and Khush have disembarked secretly, he goes ashore to meet them, leaving Esther and Mr Jackson sailing past their prey.

The friends are pleased to be reunited and Cissie assures Tad that they are now in Nebraska and near Ketty's house. However, the plains are desolate, with little water for Khush to drink and nowhere to hide from their pursuers. Khush becomes impatient and irritable as the three travellers near Ketty's home. They arrive just as Esther and Mr Jackson catch up with them and Mr Jackson asserts his claim to Khush. However, while agreeing that the papers that Mr Jackson has are not fakes, Ketty reveals that Keenan could not have sold Khush as she owns him herself. Mr Jackson petitions Ketty and her husband to sell him the elephant but, when she refuses, he and Esther eventually leave in a rage.

Cissie is upset that Khush belongs to Ketty as she had intended to sell him and give the money to Ketty so that she could remain in Nebraska with her. Tad persuades Cissie that Ketty will take her in no matter what. Ketty, seeing how much the boy and the elephant love each other, appoints Tad as Khush's keeper in exchange for a portion of the elephant's earnings.

== Reception ==
The Great Elephant Chase has received great critical acclaim. It won the Whitbread Children's book award in 1992 and the Smarties Book Prize.
