= John Birt, Baron Birt =

Former Director-General of the BBC (born 1944)

The Right Honourable The Lord Birt
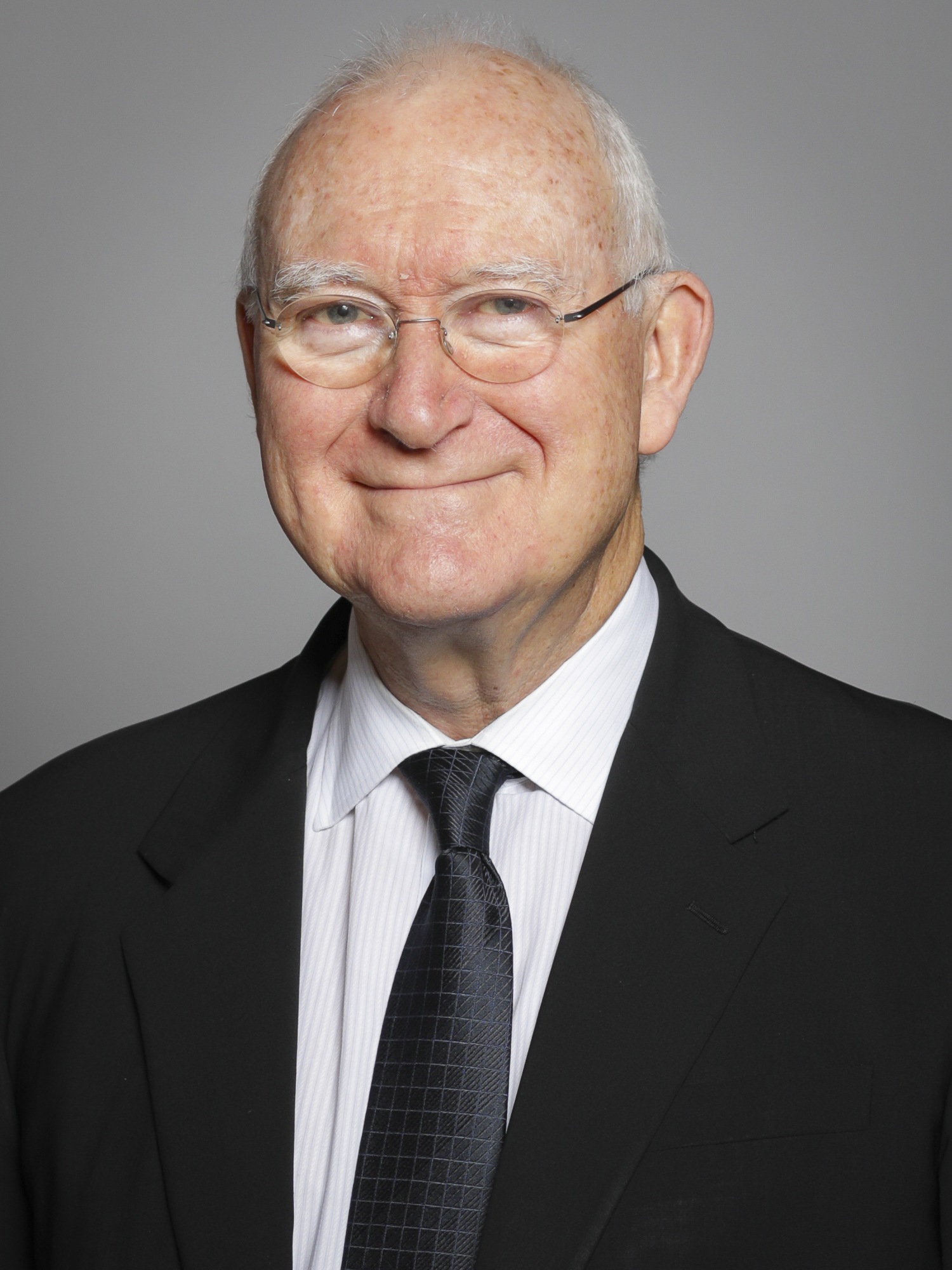
- Official portrait, 2020

Member of the House of Lords
- Lord Temporal
- Life peerage 11 February 2000

12th Director-General of the BBC
- In office 1992–2000
- Preceded by: Michael Checkland
- Succeeded by: Greg Dyke

Personal details
- Born: 10 December 1944 (age 81) Liverpool, England
- Party: None (crossbencher)
- Spouse(s): (1) Jane Lake; (2) Eithne Wallis (m. 2006)
- Children: 2
- Education: St Mary's College, Crosby; St Catherine's College, Oxford

John Birt, Baron Birt (born 10 December 1944) is a British television executive and businessman. He is a former Director-General (1992–2000) of the BBC.

After a successful career in commercial television, initially at Granada Television and later at London Weekend Television, Birt was appointed Deputy Director-General of the BBC in 1987 for his expertise in current affairs. The forced departure of Director-General Alasdair Milne after pressure from the Thatcher government required someone near the top, preferably from outside the BBC, with editorial and production experience (Milne had been summarily replaced by Michael Checkland, an accountant).

During his tenure as Director-General, Birt restructured the BBC, in the face of much internal opposition. However, others have credited him with saving the corporation from possible government privatisation, and say he prepared for the era of digital broadcasting. After leaving the BBC, Birt was Strategy Advisor to Prime Minister Tony Blair from 2001 to 2005. After 2005, he was a board member or chair of various commercial companies.

== Early life and commercial television career ==
Birt was born in Liverpool to a Catholic father, who started work as a window cleaner's assistant but rose to become a manager at the Firestone tyre company, and a Protestant mother, who worked in a dockland canteen.

He was raised as a Catholic, and educated at the direct-grant grammar school St. Mary's College, Crosby, Liverpool. Granted a place at St Catherine's College, Oxford, Birt read engineering but devoted himself to making films, graduating with a third-class degree.

== Broadcasting career ==
From 1966 to 1971, Birt worked for Granada Television, where he devised and produced the magazine programme Nice Time, starring Kenny Everett and Germaine Greer, before joining Granada's World in Action current affairs series. Birt persuaded Mick Jagger, who had just spent three nights in Brixton prison for possession of drugs, to participate in a 1967 edition of World in Action in which Jagger conversed with the editor of The Times (William Rees-Mogg) and the Bishop of Woolwich (John A. T. Robinson), among others. It was hailed as a "dialogue between generations." With Gus Macdonald, Birt became joint editor of World in Action in 1969.

Birt moved from Granada to London Weekend Television in 1971, initially to produce a series of The Frost Programme with David Frost. At LWT he was the founding editor and executive producer of the current affairs programme Weekend World, which was presented in succession by Peter Jay, Brian Walden and Matthew Parris. He became head of current affairs at LWT and, later, controller of features and current affairs. With Weekend World presenter Peter Jay, Birt contributed a series of three articles to The Times on the topic of television journalism. They argued that most television news and current affairs contained a "bias against understanding": pictures had taken precedence over analysis. Instead they advocated "a mission to explain", and that news and current affairs should be merged into a unified department staffed by editors with expertise in particular areas as well as by specialist journalists who would supply material to all programmes, along with outside experts. Such an argument was not universally accepted. Years later, in 2006, Alasdair Milne, the former BBC Director-General, said he thought Birt's "bias against understanding" argument was nonsense.

In the mid-1970s, he took a break from LWT to produce David Frost's The Nixon Interviews with the disgraced former US President Richard Nixon. In the 1977 interviews, watched by 45 million people, Nixon admitted his part in the Watergate scandal, which had led to his resignation.

In the late 1970s and early 1980s, Birt argued with David Elstein against the lobby that the newly proposed fourth terrestrial TV channel should be a second channel for ITV, but rather a wholly independent Channel 4. Their proposal matched the blueprint for the model that was eventually adopted in 1982.

Birt returned to LWT as director of programmes in 1982. During this period he revived the career of his old friend, casting the Liverpool singer Cilla Black in Blind Date. In due course she became the highest-paid female performer on UK television. Birt formed a close working relationship with his boss at LWT, Michael Grade, although this would later sour when both were working at the BBC.

== BBC career ==
John Birt's tenure at the BBC, first as Deputy Director-General and later as Director-General, was defined by radical restructuring, modernisation efforts, and significant controversy.

=== Deputy Director-General and Director of News (1987–1992) ===
Following his success at London Weekend Television (LWT), Birt was appointed Deputy Director-General of the BBC in 1987 under Director-General Michael Checkland. Simultaneously, he served as the Director of News and Current Affairs, where he created a single, unified organisation for news output across all BBC television and radio platforms for the first time. Birt was also responsible for supervising and helping to create new editorial guidelines for all BBC programming.

During this period, the BBC faced heavy political criticism, notably from Prime Minister Margaret Thatcher, regarding alleged inefficiency and wastefulness. Checkland tasked Birt with addressing these concerns in a Resources Review. Birt's resulting proposal was the basis for the later system known as Producer Choice.

==== Director-General (1992–1999) and the "Birtist" Reforms ====
Birt's promotion to Director-General in 1992 was met with controversy when it was revealed that he was initially employed on a freelance consultancy basis rather than as a permanent BBC employee. Under significant political and public pressure, Birt changed his status to a BBC employee. This required him to sell his shares in LWT, leading him to miss out on a multi-million-pound windfall when the company was acquired by Granada in 1994. The controversy was amplified when The Sunday Times revealed that Birt had been a member of the Labour Party at the time of his appointment, causing concern among Conservatives already alleging left-wing bias at the corporation.

As Director-General, Birt stated his goal was to make the BBC "the best managed public sector organisation", tackling what he saw as efficiency problems and waste of public money. He was tasked with securing the BBC's future amid rapid technical, cultural, and economic changes in global broadcasting. He introduced:

- Producer Choice (1993): Birt introduced this system of internal marketisation in April 1993, ending direct central funding of all activity. Under the system, channel controllers held the programme funds; in-house programme makers and independent producers competed on equal terms for commissions; and programme makers were free to buy services, studios, and resources from either internal BBC departments or external providers. Birt asserted the change was meant to deliver efficiency savings and reduce costs to licence-payers. The introduction of competitive forces resulted in an estimated 10,000 BBC staff leaving the organisation or being made redundant at the time. In some cases, producers found it cheaper to buy materials, such as music records, from local shops rather than paying the high rental fees charged by the BBC's own resource base, leading to in-house facilities being closed or standing idle.
- Performance management: He introduced a system of defined departmental objectives and performance management across the organisation.
- "Extending Choice": Birt commissioned this review to articulate and clarify the BBC's public purposes, providing an editorial framework for the changing corporation.
- Digitisation strategy: Birt is widely credited with preparing the BBC for the new digital landscape, which the academic Georgina Born noted was "far in advance of the BBC's terrestrial rivals." Birt personally researched emerging digital technologies, engaging with figures like Professor Nicholas Negroponte at Harvard and Bill Gates in Seattle. At the 1996 Edinburgh Television Festival, he argued that without the resources to prepare for the digital age, the BBC would be "history." He was a driving force behind the launch of 24-hour continuous news output (the BBC News Channel) and the advancement of the BBC's presence on the internet, often funding these ventures by diverting money from traditional services.

Birt argued that his radical changes made the BBC more agile and competitive, which he believed was critical to the successful renewal of the BBC's operating charter in 1996. This renewal came with a licence fee settlement that linked the fee to the Retail Prices Index (RPI) as a way to "depoliticise" the funding process. At the end of his tenure, Birt negotiated with Tony Blair a seven-year licence fee settlement at RPI plus 1.5%, the biggest increase in BBC funding in its history.

=== Controversies and legacy ===
Birt's methods and reforms drew considerable opposition from many inside and outside the BBC, including journalists John Tusa, Mark Tully, Charles Wheeler, and news correspondent Kate Adie. At the same time, the work he undertook was praised by others such as journalists John Lloyd, John Simpson, and Polly Toynbee, who often credit him with saving the BBC through necessary modernisation.

Professor Ian Hargreaves said Birt “fought off a political attempt to destabilise and privatise the BBC in the 1980s, and in the 1990s he saw the digital revolution early enough to ensure that the BBC bought a place at the front of the grid”. British journalist and former BBC correspondent Sir Mark Tully claimed Birt made the BBC a more open organisation, with “greater opportunities for people from minorities, for Asians, for blacks, and for women”.

Birt's use of dense, often impenetrable management jargon became known as "Birtspeak," a term widely mocked, notably in the satirical magazine Private Eye (which featured a miniature Dalek caricature of him). The comparison originated from playwright Dennis Potter, who famously labelled Birt a "croak-voiced Dalek" in his 1993 MacTaggart Lecture. This comparison was reinforced by a post-production department Christmas tape that cast Birt as Davros, the head of the Daleks.

Critics also argued that Birt's shift of funds to continuous news and internet ventures was detrimental to the quality of BBC core programming. Although Birt disagreed with the critics' overall portrait of the BBC at the time, he conceded that drama was a source of concern, noting, "The originality is not there as it was in the Sixties."

Microsoft chairman Bill Gates said Birt should be recognised for his “unique contribution” to broadcasting in the UK, adding: “The BBC's move into online media has set high standards for the rest of the world and has ensured that, through the power of the internet, the BBC continues to be respected and recognised as a trusted source of news and information in the digital age."

Birt's arrival hastened the departure of executive Bill Cotton, who described Birt's tenure as a "nightmare." One of Birt's predecessors, Alasdair Milne, criticised him for paying consultants large fees for the restructuring and argued Birt did little good for the BBC aside from establishing its internet service. Even Marmaduke Hussey, who appointed Birt, later claimed to have regrets.

Radio broadcaster John Dunn reported that morale was poor under Birt, and David Attenborough commented that producers spent too much time worrying about money as a result of the reforms.

In 1998, Birt imposed a controversial ban on BBC output mentioning the private life of Peter Mandelson, then a government minister. This order followed an edition of Newsnight where Matthew Parris had mentioned Mandelson's homosexuality.

Birt was succeeded as Director-General in 1999 by Greg Dyke, who also had ties to the Labour Party.

== Later reflections on broadcasting career ==
Returning to his earlier career on 26 August 2005, Birt delivered his second MacTaggart lecture at the Edinburgh International Television Festival. Partly a review of his professional life as a broadcaster, he also criticised the "tabloidisation" of intellectual concerns. He argued that Channel 4 should receive financial help, in order to preserve "public service broadcasting", which was taken as advocacy of the BBC sharing its licence fee with Channel Four, so called "top slicing". He also mentioned that his long-standing feud with Michael Grade had been resolved.

Following Director-General George Entwistle's resignation in November 2012, James Purnell argued that the new Director-General "should learn from the Birt era" stating that it was Birt's "boldness" that saved the BBC. Instead of playing it safe and avoiding mistakes, he said, Birt transformed output and embraced the internet, and rebuilt relationships with government, business and the public. Media commentator Steve Hewlett, Birt's former colleague, suggested in 2012 that it might be time for the BBC "to bring in Birt 2.0". Hewlett acknowledged that many of Birt's reforms were unpopular, but said that without them, "it is questionable whether the BBC would exist in anything like its present capable and competitive form, or indeed would have retained the huge affection of audiences".

== Post-BBC career ==
=== Advisor to Tony Blair ===
Birt was brought into Number 10 to lead the development of long-term strategy for the government on key areas of public policy. Tony Blair first asked him to produce a report on solutions to crime, and he served as advisor on Criminal Justice from 2000 to 2001. The establishment of a Serious Organised Crime Agency (SOCA) was an idea originally conceived by Birt.

Birt was made unpaid Strategy Adviser to Blair in 2001, appointed for what was termed "blue skies thinking" and claimed by Deputy Prime Minister John Prescott to be "worth every penny"; Blair wanted advice from outside the traditional Whitehall mindset – he had known Birt since the 1980s and approved of his analytical approach. Jeremy Heywood, Blair's principal private secretary, said: "He liked the way that John was willing to get right down into the data and understand the evidence, and come up with a real sense that you could do things in a totally different way." Birt supervised the development of long-term strategy on drugs, health, crime reduction, education, transport and London. His 2004 report on drug policy recommended making heroin use a criminal offence on par with possession.

However, Birt's recommendations made him unpopular with some ministers and Blair's decision to ask Birt for a "private" report on crime irritated Jack Straw and the Home Office. In 2002, he proposed a second network of motorways operated as tolls to counter the problems of traffic congestion.

Many saw Birt's role in government as controversial, since as a special advisor, rather than a civil servant, he was not formally obliged to face questions from House of Commons select committees. In October 2002, it emerged that the government had specifically asked him not to appear in front of the transport select committee, at a time when he was in charge of long-term transport strategy.

Blair asked Birt to help him define his main domestic policy priorities so he could develop precise plans for the period after the 2005 election. Birt had first proposed the idea of the "five-year plans" in 2003 and was now responsible for overseeing the Third Term Plan. This included the overall policy programme, machinery of government changes and the legislative timetable. A special project team to develop the third term was led by Birt and Cabinet Secretary Andrew Turnbull and reported regularly to the prime minister. Birt's team produced detailed proposals which would be enacted, including Pension Reform and renewing investment in Nuclear Power, with a precise grid on how to implement policy.

Concurrently, Birt served as an advisor at McKinsey & Company's Global Media Practice from 2000 to 2005. His relationship with government and McKinsey caused some controversy as McKinsey were increasingly working with UK government departments in a range of public service and defence areas. Birt remained at Number 10 as an unpaid adviser until December 2005, when he left to join private equity firm Terra Firma Capital Partners as an adviser.

The Financial Times reported at the beginning of July 2005 that Birt's office ceiling at 10 Downing Street had fallen in. However, Birt was not injured.

=== Later business career ===
From 2006 to 2010, he was an adviser for consulting firm Capgemini on strategic issues, with a focus on its Telecom, Media and Entertainment practice. Birt served as chairman of Lynx New Media (subsequently Lynx Capital Ventures) from 2000 to 2004. He was chairman of Waste Recycling Group and subsequently non-executive director of Infinis, a generator of renewable power. He also served chairman of Maltby Capital from 2007 to 2010.

Birt was chairman of PayPal Europe between 2010 and 2014, having joined the board in 2004. He later served periods as chairman of Host Europe Group (2013–2017) and CPA Global (2015–2017).

He was vice-chairman of Eutelsat from 2012 until 2019, having joined the board as an independent director in 2006.

== Honours and awards ==
Birt received an Emmy in 1995, for his "outstanding contribution" to international television.

Birt was awarded a knighthood, and on 11 February 2000 he was created a life peer as Baron Birt, of Liverpool in the County of Merseyside. He took his seat in the House of Lords in March 2000 as a crossbencher.

=== Crossbencher in the House of Lords ===
Birt is an active cross-bencher in the House of Lords, with special interests including media, broadcasting and communications; climate change and the environment; criminal justice; and education.

He spoke out in 2011 and 2012 in favour of government's proposed Health and Social Care Bill. In 2013 Birt voiced his opinion to the House of Lords on the Gay Marriage bill stating "this bill goes the whole hog and rightly allows gay couples, if they wish, to make the powerful statements of love and commitment that marriage proclaims. If gay couples want that option, they should have it."

In 2014 Birt showed his support for the assisted dying legislation, in the House of Lords debate, in which participants were evenly split. Before the 2014 Scottish referendum, Birt argued that Scottish independence would have a devastating impact on the BBC. In 2015, he led criticism of the decision for the BBC to start funding TV licences for over-75s, calling it a "deeply shocking announcement".

In 2025, with other crossbenchers in the House of Lords, Birt argued successfully for major changes to the Football Governance Bill.

== In popular culture ==
Birt is portrayed by Matthew Macfadyen in Frost/Nixon, and by Nicholas Gleaves in the fifth season of The Crown.

== Bibliography ==
- John Birt (2002). The Harder Path. Time Warner Books. ISBN 0-316-86019-0.
- Georgina Born (2004). Uncertain Vision: Birt, Dyke and the Reinvention of the BBC. Secker & Warburg. ISBN 0-436-20562-9.

== See also ==
- Frost/Nixon – 2007 play by Peter Morgan featuring a portrayal of John Birt
- Frost/Nixon – 2008 film adaptation of the above in which Birt was played by Matthew Macfadyen
- The Crown (season 5) – 2022 television series in which Nicholas Gleaves plays Birt

== Arms ==
Coat of arms of John Birt, Baron Birt
Crest A hare salient Sable holding forepaws a Black Susan slipped and leaved Or. Escutcheon Per fess wavy Argent and Gules two dragons passant in pale that in base to the sinister counterchanged. Supporters On either side a cormorant wings inverted and addorsed Proper beaked legged and holding in the beak a caduceus Or that on the dexter bendwise and that on the sinister bendwise sinister. Motto Ad Meliora (Towards A Better World)

Media offices
Preceded by Michael Checkland	Director-General of the BBC; 1992–2000	Succeeded by Greg Dyke
Orders of precedence in the United Kingdom
Preceded by The Lord Robertson of Port Ellen	Gentlemen; Baron Birt	Followed by The Lord Powell of Bayswater
