= Terrence Hardiman =

English actor (1937–2023)

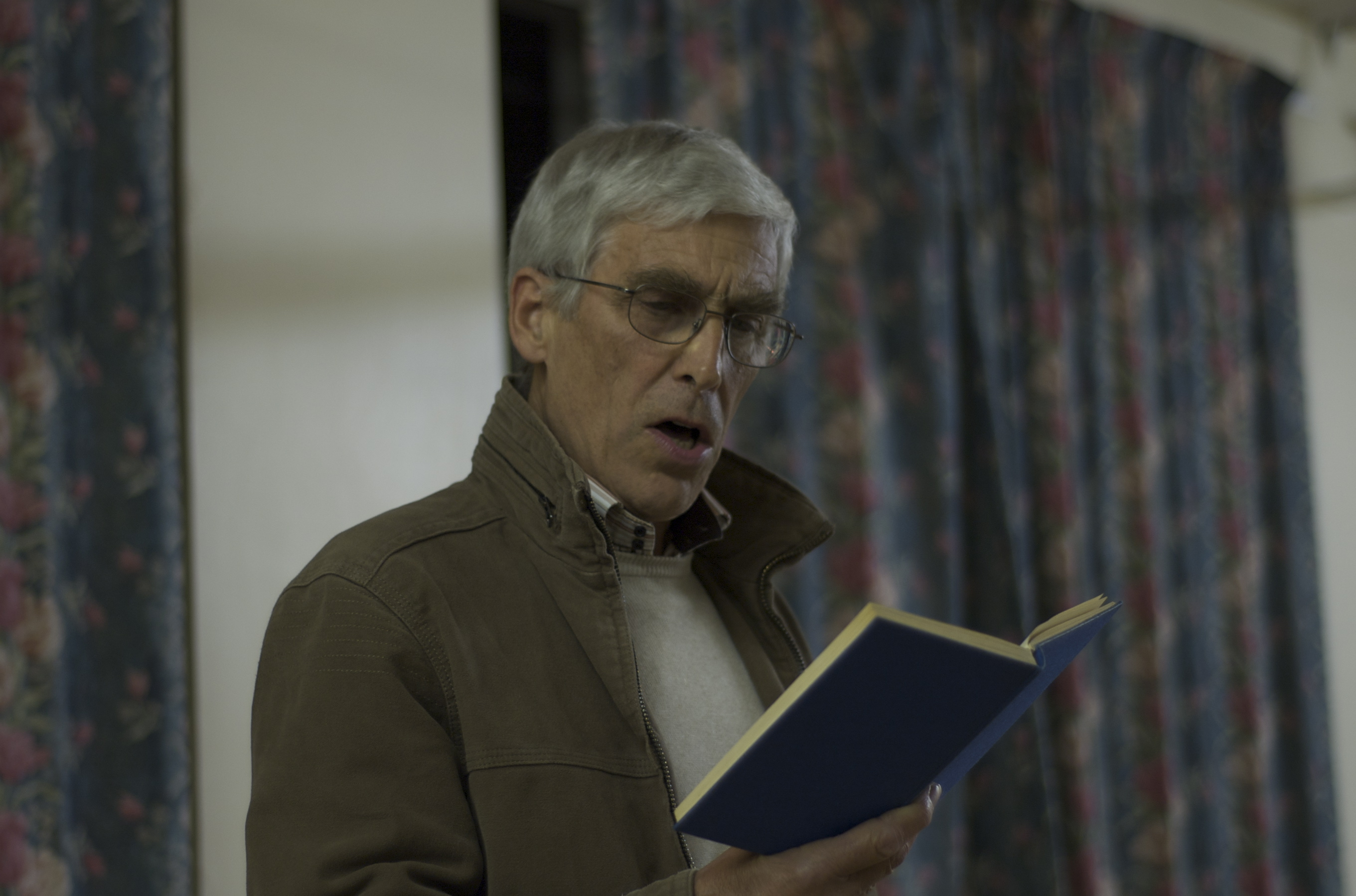
- Hardiman in 2009
- Born: 6 April 1937; Forest Gate, Essex, England
- Died: 18 April 2023 (aged 86)
- Education: University of Cambridge
- Occupation: Actor
- Years active: 1965–2023
- Known for: Secret Army; The Demon Headmaster
- Spouse: Rowena Cooper (m. 1964)
- Children: 2

Terrence Edward Hardiman (6 April 1937 – 18 April 2023) was an English actor. He often portrayed authority figures such as Nazi-era personnel (Secret Army, Colditz, Wish Me Luck and Enemy at the Door) and a British officer (When the Boat Comes In).

His other roles include: a police inspector (Prime Suspect, Juliet Bravo and Softly, Softly); a doctor (Home to Roost and The Royal); a barrister (Crown Court and The Brittas Empire); a judge (The Bill and The Courtroom); a twelfth-century abbot (Cadfael); and an evil headmaster in The Demon Headmaster. He played prime minister Ramsay MacDonald in Richard Attenborough's Gandhi. He also appeared in the Inspector Morse episode "Last Bus to Woodstock".

== Early life and education ==
Hardiman was born on 6 April 1937 in Forest Gate, Essex, now in Newham, London. His father was a policeman. Hardiman was educated at Buckhurst Hill County High School, Essex and later studied at Fitzwilliam College, Cambridge (then known as Fitzwilliam House), where he read English.

== Stage career ==
At Cambridge, Hardiman acted extensively for The Marlowe Society and the Cambridge University Amateur Dramatic Club, in both dramatic and comedic roles, alongside many of his future screen co-stars such as Derek Jacobi.

Hardiman then toured with the Royal Shakespeare Company in several principal roles, including as Starveling in Peter Brook's landmark 1970 production of A Midsummer Night's Dream.

== Film and television career ==
=== 1970s and 1980s ===
Hardiman's television work included him playing barrister Stephen Harvesty QC in Granada Television's Crown Court from 1972 to 1983.

He also had a starring role as Charles Pooter in the 1979 television adaptation of George and Weedon Grossmith's Diary of a Nobody, a role which shows his versatility more than the succession of officers he usually portrays.

Hardiman portrayed Major Reinhardt, in Secret Army, the (fictional) head of the Luftwaffe (German Air force) police who often provided a foil to Clifford Rose's more brutal S.S. Chief, Kessler. In 1990, he played a German officer, General Stuckler, in the final series of London Weekend Television's Wish Me Luck.

=== 1990s: Cadfael and The Demon Headmaster ===
A notable small role Hardiman played was a version of the Sergeant Wilson character from Dad's Army, in a 1995 episode of time travel comedy Goodnight Sweetheart, called "Don't Get Around Much Any More." Nicholas Lyndhurst's character Gary Sparrow goes back in time to a bank in the 1940s, and encounters characters called Mainwaring and Wilson. Hardiman's portrayal was a keenly observed impersonation of John Le Mesurier's own performance, incorporating many of the tics and mannerisms of the original.

From 1996 to 1998, Hardiman starred as the eponymous Demon Headmaster in the children's television drama series, which ran to three series and proved popular with adults as well as children. He reprised his role as a cameo in the 2019 revival.

Hardiman also appeared as Grand Wizard Egbert Hellibore in four episodes of The Worst Witch. Hardiman appeared in the second series of The Worst Week of My Life. Another notable recent role was as a devious Swiss murder victim in an episode of crime mystery series Jonathan Creek entitled The Eyes of Tiresias.

Hardiman's other major recurring role was as Brother Cadfael's ecclesiastical superior, Father Abbot Radulfus, in the television series. Joining him throughout the series as Prior Robert was Michael Culver, who had played his predecessor Major Brandt in Secret Army.

=== 2000s ===
Hardiman made an appearance on the daily soap on BBC One, Doctors, on 3 April 2009, as well as from 14 to 15 January 2015, and in the drama from Yorkshire, Heartbeat, as John Upton in one episode.

In 2009, he appeared in a film for the BFI, Radio Mania: An Abandoned Work, directed by British artists Iain Forsyth and Jane Pollard.

Hardiman appeared as Hawthorne in the episode of Doctor Who, "The Beast Below", on 10 April 2010.

== Personal life and death ==
Hardiman was married to Rowena Cooper and the couple had two children. Hardiman narrated hundreds of audiobooks, including series by Colin Dexter, Anne Perry, and Ruth Rendell. Hardiman's volunteer narration work for the non-profit Calibre Audio Library earned him a Silver Centurion service award in 2013.

Hardiman died on 18 April 2023, aged 86.

== Selected filmography ==
- Running Scared (1972) as Doctor
- Pope Joan (1972) as Cardinal Anastasius
- Loophole (1981) as David
- The Bunker (1981) as Hermann Fegelein
- Lady Killers (1981) as Cecil Whiteley
- Gandhi (1982) as Ramsay MacDonald
- Sahara (1983) as Browne
- Mask of Murder (1985) as Dr. Paul Crossland
- God's Outlaw (1986) as Thomas Cromwell
- Casualty (1992)
- Prime Suspect (1993) as Commander Chiswick
- Cadfael (1995–1998) as Abbot Radulfus
- The Demon Headmaster (1996–1998) as The Demon Headmaster
- Distant Shadow (2000) as The Svit
- Fishtales (2007) as Professor Ratcher
- Doctor Who (2010) as Hawthorne
- Mr. Turner (2014) as Gallery Visitors
- The Demon Headmaster (2019) as The Demon Headmaster
