= The Demon Headmaster =

Series of novels by Gillian Cross

First edition of the first book in the series.

The Demon Headmaster is a series of books by Gillian Cross which were later adapted as a television series starring Terrence Hardiman in the title role and Frances Amey as Dinah.

The title character is a strange being with the powers of hypnosis and a desire to take over the world, as he believes it will be better under his ordered rule. He has piercing light green eyes, which he normally hides behind dark-tinted glasses — removing these in order to hypnotize his victims.

Very little about the Demon Headmaster or his background is shown in the books. His name is never revealed; he is referred to only as 'the Headmaster' both in the books and on television, except when he takes on an alias —- such as the Computer Director in The Prime Minister's Brain, for example; and on each occasion he uses a title rather than a name. It's revealed in-narrative that he does have a name (Brain has characters forced to add the name to a list of people allowed to visit the Prime Minister, and Takes Over involves the Headmaster's name as a plot point), but the name itself is never spoken by anyone.

== Reading order ==
- The Demon Headmaster - ISBN 0-19-275374-6
- The Prime Minister's Brain - ISBN 0-19-275372-X
- The Revenge of the Demon Headmaster - ISBN 0-19-275373-8
- The Demon Headmaster Strikes Again - ISBN 0-19-275388-6
- The Demon Headmaster Takes Over - ISBN 0-19-275389-4
- Beware of the Demon Headmaster - ISBN 0-19-275236-7 (a short story about the Demon Headmaster, without the other characters)
- Facing the Demon Headmaster - ISBN 0-19-275369-X
- Total Control - ISBN 9780192745750
- Mortal Danger - ISBN 9780192766069

== Retroactive continuity ==
In 2017, retroactive continuity was applied to subsequent publications of the previous titles, partly to avoid continuity errors with the school-aged characters' appearances in later titles, e.g. obsolete technology is rephrased to its modern-day equivalents such as mobile phones and the internet.

== Books ==
=== The Demon Headmaster ===
First published in 1982.

Dinah Glass moves in with Lloyd and Harvey Hunter and at first, does not like them. Soon she discovers that at her new school, the Headmaster is very strange and she finds herself saying things like "I think the Headmaster is a marvellous man and this is the best school I've ever been to". With the help of her new friends, SPLAT (Society for the Protection of our Lives Against Them, the children at the school who are immune to the Demon Headmaster's hypnotic powers), she successfully stops the Headmaster's plot to hypnotize the country through the Eddy Hair Television Show and she gets adopted by the Hunters. This became the first three episodes of the first series of the television adaptation.

=== The Prime Minister's Brain ===
First published in 1985.

Dinah wins a place in the final of a computer competition, and she and SPLAT go to the finals. Little does she realise that the computer competition is a plot by the Demon Headmaster to take over the world, by hacking into the Prime Minister's computer (The Prime Minister's Brain) and hypnotizing the Prime Minister, therefore allowing him to meet the other world leaders and gain control of them himself. This became the last three episodes of the first series of the television adaptation. (Later republished as The Demon Headmaster and the Prime Minister's Brain following the success of the television series.)

=== The Revenge of the Demon Headmaster ===
First published in 1994 as Hunky Parker is Watching You.

When Ingrid turns up at a SPLAT meeting she is raving about Hunky Parker, a new TV show. It is the latest craze, she says, and soon everyone will be hooked. The other SPLAT members disagree until Ingrid shows them her Hunky DVD (video in the pre-2017 edition), which Dinah eventually realises is due to subliminal messages on non-consecutive frames in the cartoon. Tracking the source of Hunky Parker merchandise, SPLAT learns that it has been created by the Demon Headmaster, attempting to trigger riots for new merchandise that he can use to exert his control over the populace.

=== The Demon Headmaster Strikes Again ===
First published in 1996.

Dinah's father is headhunted for a new job at the Biogenetic Research Centre, unaware that the Demon Headmaster is the director. This time his lust for power sees him meddling with evolution itself. He has created an Evolution Accelerator: a machine to speed up the evolution process and produce the perfect human, beginning with the development of a fast-growing poisonous creeper that attacks Lloyd. But for this, he needs Dinah's DNA - combining it with a lizard to create Eve, a human/lizard hybrid who possesses Dinah's intellect but lacks her emotions - and then put her into terrible danger, pitting her against Eve to test his theories. This became series two of the television adaptation.

=== The Demon Headmaster Takes Over ===
First published in 1997.

When the army starts dismantling the research centre, Dinah contacts Professor Claudia Rowe, an expert on botanical sciences who has expressed an interest in the creeper. Then weird things start to happen. Libraries start closing and their books are taken away. Telephones stop working, and there is no internet access. People start talking like robots, even Claudia Rowe, and more and more of the population seem to be wearing strange badges. Dinah's search leads her to the university where she finds the mysterious Director developing "Hyperbrain", a computer with superhuman intelligence and deadly potential. SPLAT swiftly realises that, although the original Headmaster was killed when he fell into the Evolution Accelerator, the machine still recorded his DNA and was therefore able to create a clone, lacking the original's memories but retaining his lust for control. This became the third and final series of the television adaptation.

=== Facing the Demon Headmaster ===
First published in 2002.

The new club Purple is the place to go - if one can get in - and Mandy's cousin, Ellie, persuades Dinah and her friends to come along too. The man everyone wants to see is DJ Pardoman whose face keeps changing from Elvis to Madonna to Brad Pitt. His electronic mask is mesmerising but no one knows who he really is. When the kids visit his website they find an online competition: the person who finds out DJ Pardoman's true identity will be allowed to lift off the mask. Dinah, thinking the whole setup strange, joins in out of curiosity. In her search she stumbles across something amazing: her real father might be alive after years of thinking he was dead. Dinah must find out more. But she only realises the truth of these strange coincidences too late. This time the Demon Headmaster is intent on ensuring that Dinah will not interfere with his plans.

=== Total Control ===
First published in 2017.

The story continues with a new group of children, none of which are immune to hypnotism, in a new school without SPLAT's members. The stories centers on Lizzie, her younger brother, their friend Ethan and Angelika. Lizzie and her brother return from the United States, where their mother had surgery. After returning to their school, they realise that the school has a new headmaster and the students are showing exceptional talents, even their bully enemy Blake. However, Lizzie suddenly starts to behave aggressively against the school; her brother becomes a robotics genius, and their recently made friend Ethan becomes a football star. But when they try to talk, or even think about those sudden changes, their minds goes blank. Ethan eventually discovers that the Headmaster is hypnotizing and controlling everybody in the school. They team up with Angelika (a girl who suddenly became a coffee business enthusiast) and even Blake (who became a multilingual greeter) and discovers the great plot of the Headmaster to show to the Prime Minister the great results of the school, therefore allowing the Headmaster to administer other schools.

=== Mortal Danger ===
First published in 2019.

Ms Martin (nicknamed "Ms Mountain" by the children) is appointed head of Hazelbrook School and becomes popular, organizing contests in what the pupils like doing. Lizzie, Tyler and Blake enter a competition to win a trip to the remote Murdoch Island in Scotland. Ethan and Angelika do not want to go but are enlisted by Ms Mountain to secretly help their friends win. Lizzie hears a mysterious voice while searching for clues for a novel she is writing, it sounds familiar. Meanwhile, some other schools in the area are performing badly including Ethan's old school which set homework assignments the pupils cannot do while another drops all subjects making pupils do all the cleaning and another makes all lessons take place in the swimming pool. This leads to a backlash with parents calling for the head teachers to resign and control of those schools was then handed to educational advisory organization New Word led by Simon Weatherby. Lizzie, Tyler, Blake and Conan O'Dell win the contest and on the night before their departure for the trip, Ethan and Angelika break into Ms Mountain's office to find a DVD labelled "To my successor" Tyler mentioned and bring it to Ethan's home. The disc features the Demon Headmaster hypnotising the viewer to organize the trip to separate the friends and put them in danger. Before Ethan has a chance to warn his friends, they had already departed. On the island, Lizzie discovers that the rope Blake used for rock climbing was worn and Ms Mountain made them go kayaking at night without life jackets causing Tyler to capsize and nearly drown. Photographs of these incidents are posted onto the school's website leading to calls for Ms Mountain's resignation. This also leads to Angelika's mother, as the school's deputy head, to go to the island with Simon Weatherby and Ethan stows away on the minibus they are taking. Lizzie enters the islands bothy to confront the expedition leader about the incidents and comes face to face with the Headmaster who hypnoizes her into going up to a cave on the mountain and stay there quietly until she hears his voice again. This leads to Mr Wasu searching for her without success and then her friends with Ethan joining them quietly follow the Headmaster until he discovers them. He shouts loud enough for Lizzie to hear him snapping her out of her trance and the friends' actions lead to him falling down a cliff. The friends cannot find him when they reach the bottom but Ethan manages to photograph Weatherby and a second person flying away in a helicopter. Back at the school, the friends manage to convince the community that the photographs of the dangerous incidents are fake news and Ethan's photos of Weatherby's flight turn them against New World and Ms Mountain is allowed to stay in her post.

=== Short stories ===
In 1998, Puffin Books released a series of goody bags on certain themes and featured a notepad, pencil, rubber, etc., along with a small book. In the 'Fantasy' goody bag there was a book calling 'Crash Landing & Other Stories' by Gillian Cross. This book contains three short stories about the Demon Headmaster or people similar to him.

The first story, called 'Crash Landing', is set at some point after The Prime Minister's Brain, and is about the Demon Headmaster crashing his getaway helicopter in a small village, although he is identified only as 'the Visitor'. It features SPLAT-type characters, including a lead named Charity who actually reads the Demon Headmaster books in the story, Charity defeating the Headmaster by using mirrored sunglasses to trick him into hypnotizing himself.

The second story, called Carnival!, does not explicitly identify one of its characters as the Demon Headmaster, but from the illustrations and description are meant to make it obvious that it is him.

The third story is called 'Maths Homework', and features a teacher referred to as Old Webster. This is not the Demon Headmaster but is a very similar character. The introduction to the story says, 'Maybe you think you have spotted the Demon Headmaster somewhere. Are you sure? Things aren't always what they seem.'

In the front of the book it says that 'Crash Landing' was first published in Shark And Chips And Other Stories, and that 'Carnival' was published in the Young Telegraph in 1996. The third story is not mentioned.

== Characters ==
=== Dinah Glass/Dinah Hunter ===
Dinah is the main protagonist in the story The Demon Headmaster by Gillian Cross. She arrives in the story at the Hunters' house as a foster child, having been orphaned at an early age and brought up in a children's home. She is extraordinarily intelligent, but she normally keeps this quiet. Her intelligence causes the Headmaster to take an interest in her, and makes her pivotal in his plans to win a national school quiz competition for nefarious ends, as well as other subsequent plots, made easier by the fact that she is the only member of SPLAT not immune to his hypnosis. After the events of the first story, Dinah is adopted by the Hunter family and becomes Dinah Hunter.

=== Lloyd Hunter ===
Lloyd is the eldest son of Mr and Mrs Hunter. He is the founder and leader of the Society for the Protection of our Lives Against Them, or SPLAT as it is known. Lloyd is one of only five children in the entire school whom the Headmaster is unable to hypnotize. Lloyd comes across as arrogant and cocky at times and also is not the brightest kid at school unlike his now proper sister, Dinah, but Lloyd has shown on more than one occasion he is by no means stupid and is a more than capable leader of SPLAT even though he does come across as bossy and hates people stealing his thunder. Lloyd at first is very hostile towards Dinah and also takes the longest to accept her out of all the members of SPLAT, but eventually he is the first to suggest that his and Harvey's parents adopt Dinah. A standing joke within the stories is Lloyd's tendency to make loud alliterative exclamations when annoyed or surprised, typically involving strange-coloured foodstuffs - e.g. 'Black bananas!'

=== Harvey Hunter ===
Harvey is a pleasant laid-back boy, very different to his older brother, Lloyd. It is clear he is very close to Lloyd, possibly because Lloyd has always looked out for him at school and helped him stay out of trouble with the Headmaster. Harvey accepts Dinah into the family and SPLAT a lot quicker than Lloyd and the others do, and soon is as close to his new sister as he is his brother. Harvey seems to understand Dinah more than Lloyd does and is more prepared to listen to her.

=== Ian ===
Ian acts as Lloyd's second-in-command in SPLAT. Ian, like Harvey, is very laid back and very much the joker of SPLAT. Ian will often break any tension with a well-timed joke and acts as a good foil to the more serious Lloyd.

=== Mandy ===
Mandy is one of the more mature members of SPLAT and seems to be the motherly influence in the society. She is the best at soothing people like Lloyd and Ingrid when they get in a temper, and is generally the most level-headed of the gang, although she is not above making the odd snide remark when Lloyd's plans backfire.

=== Ingrid ===
Ingrid is the youngest member of SPLAT, but she is no pushover. Ingrid is generally the most childish member of SPLAT, prone to sulking when things do not go her way or the others do not listen to her. The fact that she is the youngest does mean that she is generally ignored if she makes a suggestion.

=== Lizzie Warren ===
Lizzie becomes suspicious over what has changed at Hazelbrook School while she was away in the United States. She enjoys writing but is forced to write and research essays on William Shakespeare by the Demon Headmaster. He is usually well behaved but was nearly excluded after getting into a fight with Blake in an attempt to defend her brother. This leads the Headmaster to use her as a troublemaker for his scheme.

=== Tyler Warren ===
Lizzie's younger brother. Tyler enjoys performing magic tricks but is forced by the Headmaster to design and build a robot. However, Tyler becomes attached to the robot and names it Robo even after the Headmaster's scheme fails.

=== Ethan Prendergast ===
Ethan is transferred to Hazelbrook School after his Auntie Beryl read the school's website which was designed by the Headmaster to influence the pupils' parents and guardians. Ethan enjoys IT including editing but is forced to become good at football for the Headmaster's scheme. He becomes suspicious of the school and befriends Lizzie after noticing how strangely she behaves while wrecking the school's dining hall.

=== Blake Vinney ===
Blake was a bully before the Demon Headmaster took over Hazelbrook. He was forced to become a multilingual welcomer as part of the Headmaster's scheme. He does not enjoy this and enlists the help of Lizzie leading him to befriend her and help thwart the plot.

=== Angelika Maron ===
The daughter of Hazelbrook's deputy head. She is forced to run a drinks stall, as part of the Headmaster's scheme, which she does not enjoy. She enlists the help of Lizzie's group leading her to befriend them and help thwart the Headmaster's plot.

=== The Demon Headmaster ===
The Headmaster is the main antagonist of the series. He can turn almost anyone into a hypnotic state by having them look into his eyes, except for a few who seem to be naturally immune, among them is Ingrid, Mandy, Harvey, Lloyd and Ian. He has a fixation with order and control, attempting to eliminate chaos even if that means basically depriving people of emotion, and has demonstrated a strong desire to enforce that control on others. In the course of the novels he has either established or infiltrated such diverse organisations as a school, a computer lab, a television studio, a genetics research facility, a university, and even a night club, with the goal of using his contacts in these businesses to enforce his will on the world. The original Headmaster was killed at the conclusion of The Demon Headmaster Strikes Again when he was forced into his own evolution accelerator machine by a fast-growing creeper he had created, but the machine was later accidentally activated to create a clone of the Headmaster, who was able to learn about the world from the material in the research centre but lacks any of the original's personal memories. As a result, the 'new' Headmaster retains the original's desire for control and hypnotic abilities, but completely failed to recognise Lloyd, only identifying Dinah as an associate of the original Headmaster because he found a video recording of her talking to his 'predecessor'.

== Television adaptations ==
In 1995, the Demon Headmaster books were adapted by the BBC to make a television series based on the books, starring Terrence Hardiman in the title role. For the show, the Headmaster's glasses were changed from the dark-tinted ones he wore in the books to blue-tinted.

The series proved popular with children and ran for three series from 2 January 1996 to 22 January 1998. The first series contained six episodes, and aired twice weekly from 2 to 18 January 1996, the second series contained seven episodes, and aired once a week from 25 September to 6 November 1996, and the third series contained six episodes, and aired twice weekly from 6 to 22 January 1998.

The first series of the show was split into two distinctive story lines, with the first three episodes adapted from the first book in the series "The Demon Headmaster" and the last three were adapted from the second book "The Demon Headmaster and the Prime Minister's Brain". The second series was adapted from the fourth book "The Demon Headmaster Strikes Again". The third and final series was adapted from the fifth book "The Demon Headmaster Takes Over".

In 2019, CBBC broadcast a new adaptation, later revealed as a sequel to the previous show, from the book Total Control. It aired from Monday 14 October with the pilot episode, everystudentastar, adapted and showrun by Emma Reeves. Terrence Hardiman returned as the original Demon Headmaster in the first season's final episode, where he forced his 'successor' (Nicholas Gleaves) to stand down when their plans were thwarted — albeit only appearing as a hologram of himself rather than in person.

Reeves has pitched a second series to CBBC, using further elements of Total Control, as well as its sequel, Mortal Danger. A second series has since been confirmed, however ultimately, due to the delays caused by the COVID-19 pandemic it was cancelled.

== Audiobooks ==
All of the original books in the series were released on audiobook, although are now out of print. Most of the books in the series were read by Judy Bennett, although Facing the Demon Headmaster was read by Kelly Hunter and not Judy Bennett. Also The Demon Headmaster (the first of the series) was read by Terrence Hardiman and released on cassette.

The newer stories are narrated on audiobook by Steven Crossley.
