= Nicholas Gleaves =

English actor and playwright (born 1969)

- Born: 2 January 1969 (age 57); Halliwell, Bolton, Lancashire, England
- Occupation: Actor
- Years active: 1992–present
- Spouse: Lesley Sharp (m. 1994)
- Children: 2

Nicholas Gleaves (born 2 January 1969) is an English actor and playwright.

== Career ==
Gleaves's first theatre part was as an extra in Don Carlos at the Royal Exchange Theatre in Manchester. He did several plays there including the lead in Macbeth. When interviewed about this play, he said he never had the superstition that surrounded it, "...all that spitting and spinning round — it all seems like quite hard work".

He has been in many television shows since 1992; Gleaves was Rick Powell in the television drama series Playing the Field. He had the role of Ray Fairburn in Conviction. Conviction was filmed at Salford Lads' Club which delighted Gleaves because of the building's connection to The Smiths. In The Chase, he was the father Tom Bedford. In 2009, he said the idea for Survivors, in which he played the scientist Whitaker, was "great". He played DS Andy Roper in the first two series of Scott & Bailey. Of this role, he said, "I've done quite a few cop shows and as much as I enjoy testosterone, shouting at villains and all that, I really fell in love with this. As soon as I read it I saw something new and original. That was one of the reasons why I wanted to be involved because it was so different and very believable."

In 2019, Gleaves played the title role in the 2019 revival of the classic CBBC series The Demon Headmaster.

Gleaves has also started to write shows for radio.

== Personal life ==
Originally from the Halliwell area of Bolton, Lancashire, England, Gleaves attended Sharples School from 1980 to 1985. After completing his schooling, his mother made him attend a play and this sparked his interest in acting. He is a fan of The Smiths and long time supporter of Bolton Wanderers. Gleaves is married to actress Lesley Sharp. They have two sons and reside in London.

== Filmography ==
=== Film ===
Year	Title	Role	Notes
1993	Century	Daniel	
1994	Fever	Jo	Short film
1999	Safer	(unknown)	Short film
2006	Half Light	Dr. Robert Freedman	
2006	Starter for 10	Speaker for Nuclear Disarmament	
2007	Mary and Mick	Mick	Short film. Also writer
2008	Incendiary	Lenny	
2009	A Congregation of Ghosts	Ellis Baxter	
2010	Chatroom	Paul	
2011	Captain America: The First Avenger	Hydra agent	
2014	United Passions	Henri Delaunay	
2015	Nightstand	Rob	Short film
2019	Spider-Man: Far From Home	Guterman	

=== Television ===
Year	Title	Role	Network	Notes
1992	Boon	Carl	ITV	Series 7, Episode 5: "Away from It All"
1992	Casualty	George Reynolds	BBC One	Series 7, Episode 6: "Profit and Loss"
1993	Heartbeat	Eric Doubleday	ITV	Series 2, Episode 8: "Baby Blues"
1994	Fair Game	Nigel	BBC One	Television film
1994	Faith	Andy Morgan	ITV	Mini-series, Episodes 1–4
1994	Soldier Soldier	Nicholas Pope	ITV	Series 4, Episode 4: "Second Sight"
1995	99-1	PC	ITV	Series 2, Episode 6: "The Lost Ones"
1995	Harry	Dean Hawkins	BBC One	Series 2, Episode 7: "A Question of Truth"
1995	Moving Story	Sam	ITV	Series 2, Episode 6: "Superstition"
1995	Capital Lives	Phil	ITV	Series 2, Episode 3: "In Cahoots"
1996	Ellington	Bradley Stokes	ITV	Episode 5: "Getting Rid"
1996	Madson	Phil Hartigan	BBC One	Series 1, Episode 6
1996	Screen Two	Daniel	BBC Two	Series 13, Episode 6: "Century"
1996	Poldark	Stephen Cravenson	ITV	Television film
1997	Wokenwell	PC Rudy Whiteside	ITV	Episodes 1–6
1997	Lloyds Bank Channel 4 Film Challenge	Chalky	Channel 4	Series 4, Episode 1: "Nurse Ajax"
1998	Out of Hours	Mr. Russell	BBC One	Mini-series, Episode 4
1998	The Bill	Danny Charlton	ITV	Series 14, Episodes 79–81: "Tainted Love: Parts 1–3"
1998–2002	Playing the Field	Rick Powell	BBC One	Series 1–5; 23 episodes
2000	My Fragile Heart	Joe Macavoy	ITV	2-part television film
2001	In Deep	Bradley Sullivan	BBC One	Series 1, Episodes 3 & 4: "Romeo Trap: Parts 1 & 2"
2001	Perfect	Mike	ITV	Television film
2001	Now You See Her	Paul	Sky One	Television film
2001	Linda Green	Carl Williamson	BBC One	Series 1, Episode 8: "Fitness Freak"
2002	Being April	Eddie	BBC One	Episodes 1–6
2003	The Queen's Nose	Duncan	CBBC	Series 7, Episodes 2–6
2004	Dalziel and Pascoe	Sam Mattis	BBC One	Series 8, Episode 4: "Soft Touch"
2004	Down to Earth	Steve Benson	BBC One	Series 4, Episodes 7 & 8: "First Love" & "Unfinished Business"
2004	Doctors	Pete Preston	BBC One	Series 6, Episode 1: "Two's Company"
2004	Conviction	Ray Fairburn	BBC Three	Mini-series, 6 episodes
2005	Heartbeat	Barry Calder	ITV	Series 14, Episode 15: "Icon"
2005	Silent Witness	DSI Phil Elliott	BBC One	Series 9, Episodes 1 & 2: "Ghosts: Parts 1 & 2"
2006	Bombshell	Sean Collins	TV One	Episode 4
2006	The Inspector Lynley Mysteries	Dr. Simon Wilson	BBC One	Series 5, Episode 1: "Natural Causes"
2006	Mysterious Creatures	Richard Nicholas	ITV	Television film
2006–2007	The Chase	Tom Bedford	BBC One	Series 1 & 2; 20 episodes
2007	City Lights	DS Gary Tate	ITV	Episodes 1–6
2008	Fallout	DS Matt Ryder	Channel 4	Television film
2008–2010	Survivors	James Whitaker	BBC One	Series 1 & 2; 9 episodes
2009	Robin Hood	Thornton	BBC One	Series 3, Episode 9: "A Dangerous Deal"
2009	Murderland	Oliver	ITV	Mini-series, Episodes 1–3
2010	Foyle's War	Larry Hains	ITV	Series 6, Episode 2: "Killing Time"
2010	Ashes to Ashes	DI Geoff Bevan	BBC One	Series 3, Episode 5
2010	Reunited	Andrew	BBC One	Television pilot
2011	Twenty Twelve	Anthony Preston	BBC Four	Series 1, Episode 1: "Countdown"
2011	Waterloo Road	Richard Whitman	BBC One	Series 7, Episodes 5–10
2011–2012	Scott & Bailey	DS Andy Roper	ITV	Series 1 & 2; 14 episodes
2012	Public Enemies	Trevor Brotherton	BBC One	Mini-series, Episodes 1–3
2013	Jo	Maurice Langlois	TF1	Mini-series, Episode 1: "Notre Dame"
2013	Vera	Tim Hopkins	ITV	Series 3, Episode 1: "Castles in the Air"
2014	Marvellous	Rev Mark	BBC Two	Television film
2014	Chasing Shadows	Alex Wernley	ITV	Mini-series, Episodes 3 & 4: "Off Radar: Parts 1 & 2"
2015	DCI Banks	Gerald Foster	ITV	Series 4, Episodes 5 & 6: "Ghosts: Parts 1 & 2"
2015	Not Safe for Work	Minister	Channel 4	Mini-series, Episode 5. Series originally called Cut
2016	Cold Feet	Trevor Green	ITV	Series 6, Episodes 2 & 3
2017	Death in Paradise	Peter Baxter	BBC One	Series 6, Episode 8: "Murder in the Polls"
2018	Midsomer Murders	Ray Fryer	ITV	Series 19, Episode 5: "Death by Persuasion"
2018	The Split	Bill Graham	BBC One	Series 1, Episode 4
2018	Married to a Paedophile	Alex	Channel 4	Television film
2018	Bodyguard	Roger Penhaligon MP	BBC One	Episodes 1–5
2018–2019	Coronation Street	Duncan Radfield	ITV	Regular role; 22 episodes
2019	The Demon Headmaster	The Headmaster	CBBC	Main role, Episodes 1–10
2019	Bike Gangs: The Hunters & The Hunted	Himself - Narrator	Channel 5	Television documentary film
2022	The Rising	William Wyatt	Sky Max	Episodes 1–8
2022	The Crown	John Birt	Netflix	Series 5, Episode 8: "Gunpowder"
2023	Silent Witness	Bob Stratton	BBC One	Series 26, Episodes 7 & 8: "Hearts of Darkness: Parts 1 & 2"
2024–2026	After the Flood	Sergeant Phil Mackie	ITV	Series 1 & 2; 12 episodes
2025	The Bombing of Pan Am 103	Allen Feraday	BBC One	Mini-series, Episodes 1–6
2025	Riot Women	Tony Gaskell	BBC One	Episode 1. Post-production

=== Theatre ===
His theatre credits include:

- The Front Page. This Sam Mendes production at the Donmar in 1997 had Gleaves as the newshound Wilson.
- Alan Jeffcote in Hindle Wakes by Stanley Houghton at the Royal Exchange, Manchester. Directed by Helena Kaut-Howson (1996 and 1998).
- On the Shore of the Wide World. In 2005, Gleaves portrayed the father Peter, first at the Royal Exchange Theatre and then at the Royal National Theatre. He was nominated for a MEN Theatre Award in the category of best actor in a leading role.
- Macbeth. He played the lead in 2009 production at the Royal Exchange Theatre.
- Dr Faustus. 2010 saw him take on the role of Mephistophilis.
- Chair. In this 2012 production, Gleaves's part is that of a soldier. Lyric Theatre Studio, Hammersmith.
- The Saga of Noggin the Nog. He played the nasty Uncle Nogbad in spring 2013.
