= Frost/Nixon (film) =

2008 historical drama film

- Theatrical release poster
- Directed by: Ron Howard
- Screenplay by: Peter Morgan
- Based on: Frost/Nixon by Peter Morgan
- Produced by: Brian Grazer; Ron Howard; Tim Bevan; Eric Fellner
- Starring: Frank Langella; Michael Sheen; Kevin Bacon; Rebecca Hall; Toby Jones; Matthew Macfadyen; Oliver Platt; Sam Rockwell
- Cinematography: Salvatore Totino
- Edited by: Daniel P. Hanley; Mike Hill
- Music by: Hans Zimmer
- Production companies: Imagine Entertainment; Working Title Films; StudioCanal; Relativity Media
- Distributed by: Universal Pictures (international); StudioCanal (France)
- Release dates: October 15, 2008 (London); December 5, 2008 (United States); January 23, 2009 (United Kingdom); April 1, 2009 (France)
- Running time: 122 minutes
- Countries: United States; United Kingdom; France
- Language: English
- Budget: $25 million
- Box office: $27.4 million

Frost/Nixon is a 2008 historical drama film based on the 2006 play by Peter Morgan, who also adapted the screenplay. The film tells the story behind the Frost/Nixon interviews of 1977. The film was directed by Ron Howard. A co-production of the United States, the United Kingdom and France, the film was produced for Universal Pictures by Howard, Brian Grazer of Imagine Entertainment, and Tim Bevan and Eric Fellner of Working Title Films, and received five Oscar nominations, including Best Picture, Best Actor, and Best Director.

The film reunites the original two stars from the West End and Broadway productions of the play: Michael Sheen as British television broadcaster David Frost and Frank Langella as former United States President Richard Nixon.

It premiered at the London Film Festival on October 15, 2008, and was released in the United States on December 5, 2008, the United Kingdom on January 23, 2009, and France on April 1, 2009. Despite critical acclaim, the film underperformed at the box office, grossing $27.4 million on a budget of $25 million.

== Plot ==
After the Watergate scandal of 1972–74, 400 million people worldwide watch on television as former United States President Richard Nixon departs the White House aboard Marine One following his resignation. British talk show host David Frost watches from Australia and is inspired to pursue an interview with Nixon. Irving Lazar, Nixon's agent, believes the interviews would allow Nixon to salvage his reputation and profit financially. Nixon agrees to a deal with Frost.

Frost persuades his friend and producer John Birt of the interviews' potential for success and they fly to California to meet Nixon. Frost flirts with Caroline Cushing on the flight, and a relationship develops. Unable to sell the interviews to American networks, Frost finances the project with private money, brokering deals with advertisers and local television stations to syndicate the interviews. Bob Zelnick and Jim Reston are hired to help Frost research and prepare. Reston presses Frost to prioritize getting a confession from Nixon about Watergate.

Under scrutiny by Nixon's chief of staff, Jack Brennan, Frost and Nixon embark on the first three recording sessions. Frost is restricted by time limits, and allows Nixon to dominate the sessions regarding the Vietnam War and foreign policy. Frost's team questions his abilities, angry that Nixon has been permitted to rehabilitate his tarnished image. Frost is distracted by poor sponsorship and the cancellation of his talk show in Australia.

Four days before the final interview, on Watergate, Frost receives a phone call from an inebriated Nixon who declares they both know the final interview will make or break their careers. He compares himself to Frost, insisting they both came from humble backgrounds and struggled to reach the top of their fields. Nixon assures Frost he considers the final interview a battle, that he will win. The conversation energizes Frost who works relentlessly to prepare. Reston puts aside his criticism of Frost to pursue a lead at the Federal Courthouse library in Washington.

Frost ambushes Nixon in the final interview with damning transcripts of a conversation with Charles Colson that Reston procured. To his team's horror, Nixon admits that he did unethical things, adding, "When the President does it, that means it's not illegal." A stunned Frost is on the verge of obtaining a confession when Brennan disrupts the recording. When the interview resumes, Frost returns to his original line of questioning and Nixon admits that he "let the American people down."

After the interviews have aired, Frost and Cushing pay a farewell visit to Nixon and the two men graciously thank each other. Frost gives Nixon a pair of Italian shoes identical to the ones Frost wore during the interviews that Nixon had admired. In a private moment, Nixon asks about the night he drunkenly called Frost, implying that he has no recollection of the event. For the first time, Nixon addresses Frost by his first name. Nixon watches Frost and Cushing leave before placing the shoes on the villa's stone railing and solemnly looking out at the sunset.

A textual epilogue states that the interviews were wildly successful and that Nixon never escaped controversy until his death from a stroke in 1994.

== Cast ==
- Frank Langella as Richard Nixon
- Michael Sheen as David Frost
- Kevin Bacon as Jack Brennan
- Rebecca Hall as Caroline Cushing
- Toby Jones as Irving "Swifty" Lazar
- Matthew Macfadyen as John Birt
- Oliver Platt as Bob Zelnick
- Sam Rockwell as James Reston Jr.
- Clint Howard as Lloyd Davis
- Patty McCormack as Pat Nixon
- Andy Milder as Frank Gannon
- Keith MacKechnie as Marvin Minoff
- Rance Howard as Ollie
- Jim Meskimen as Ray Price
- Kaine Bennett Charleston as Sydney News Director
- Gabriel Jarret as Ken Khachigian
- Kate Jennings Grant as Diane Sawyer
- Geoffrey Blake as Interview Director
- Gavin Grazer as White House Director

Other figures and personalities depicted in the film include Tricia Nixon Cox, Michael York, Hugh Hefner, helicopter pilot Gene Boyer (as himself), Raymond Price, Ken Khachigian, Sue Mengers and Jay White as Neil Diamond. To prepare for his role as Richard Nixon, Frank Langella visited the Richard Nixon Presidential Library in Yorba Linda, California, and interviewed many people who had known the former president. On the set, the cast and crew addressed Langella as "Mr. President". Warren Beatty turned down the role of Richard Nixon as he felt that "Nixon was not treated compassionately".

== Release ==
Frost/Nixon had its world premiere on October 15, 2008, as the opening film of the 52nd London Film Festival. It was released in three theaters in the United States on December 5 before expanding several times over the following weeks. It was released in the United Kingdom and expanded into wide status in the United States on January 23, 2009.

The film was released on DVD and Blu-ray on April 21, 2009. Special features include deleted scenes, the making of the film, the real interviews between Frost and Nixon, the Nixon Presidential Library and a feature commentary with Ron Howard.

=== Box office ===
Frost/Nixon had a limited release at three theaters on December 5, 2008, and grossed $180,708 in its opening weekend, ranking number 22. Opening wide at 1,099 theaters on January 23, 2009, the film grossed $3,022,250 at the box office in the United States and Canada, ranking number 16. The film's gross for Friday, January 30 was estimated the next day at $420,000. Frost/Nixon grossed an estimated $18,622,031 in the United States and Canada and $8,804,304 in other territories for a total of $27,426,335 worldwide, recouping its $25 million budget by a thin margin but making a loss when factoring in the significant promotional costs.

=== Critical response ===
On review aggregation website Rotten Tomatoes, the film has an approval rating of 93% based on 258 reviews, with a weighted average score of 8.00/10. The site's critical consensus reads, "Frost/Nixon is weighty and eloquent; a cross between a boxing match and a ballet with Oscar worthy performances." Metacritic gives the film an average score of 80 out of 100, based on 38 critics, indicating "generally favorable" reviews.

Critic Roger Ebert gave the film four stars, commenting that Langella and Sheen "do not attempt to mimic their characters, but to embody them." Peter Travers of Rolling Stone gave the film 3½ stars, saying that Ron Howard "turned Peter Morgan's stage success into a grabber of a movie laced with tension, stinging wit and potent human drama." Writing for Variety, Liz Smith praised Langella's performance in particular, stating, "by the final scenes, Langella has all but disappeared so as to deliver Nixon himself." René Rodríguez of The Miami Herald gave the film two stars and commented that the picture "pales in comparison to Oliver Stone's Nixon when it comes to humanizing the infamous leader" despite writing that the film "faithfully reenacts the events leading up to the historic 1977 interviews." Manohla Dargis of The New York Times said, "stories of lost crowns lend themselves to drama, but not necessarily audience-pleasing entertainments, which may explain why Frost/Nixon registers as such a soothing, agreeably amusing experience, more palliative than purgative."

=== Awards and nominations ===
Award Show	Nominations	Nominee(s)	Result
Academy Awards	Best Picture	Brian Grazer, Ron Howard and Eric Fellner	Nominated
Academy Awards	Best Director	Ron Howard	Nominated
Academy Awards	Best Actor	Frank Langella	Nominated
Academy Awards	Best Adapted Screenplay	Peter Morgan	Nominated
Academy Awards	Best Film Editing	Mike Hill and Daniel P. Hanley	Nominated
British Academy Film Awards	Best Film	Brian Grazer, Ron Howard, Eric Fellner and Tim Bevan	Nominated
British Academy Film Awards	Best Director	Ron Howard	Nominated
British Academy Film Awards	Best Actor	Frank Langella	Nominated
British Academy Film Awards	Best Adapted Screenplay	Peter Morgan	Nominated
British Academy Film Awards	Best Editing	Mike Hill and Daniel P. Hanley	Nominated
British Academy Film Awards	Best Makeup and Hair	Edouard F. Henriques and Kim Santantonio	Nominated
Golden Globes Awards	Best Motion Picture - Drama	Frost/Nixon	Nominated
Golden Globes Awards	Best Actor in a Motion Picture - Drama	Frank Langella	Nominated
Golden Globes Awards	Best Director	Ron Howard	Nominated
Golden Globes Awards	Best Original Score	Hans Zimmer	Nominated
Golden Globes Awards	Best Screenplay	Peter Morgan	Nominated
Screen Actors Guild Awards	Outstanding Performance by a Male Actor in a Leading Role	Frank Langella	Nominated
Screen Actors Guild Awards	Outstanding Performance by a Cast in a Motion Picture	Kevin Bacon, Rebecca Hall, Toby Jones, Frank Langella, Matthew MacFadyen, Oliver Platt, Sam Rockwell and Michael Sheen	Nominated
Las Vegas Film Society	Best Actor	Frank Langella	Won
Las Vegas Film Society	Best Director	Ron Howard	Won
Las Vegas Film Society	Best Editing	Mike Hill and Daniel P. Hanley	Won
Las Vegas Film Society	Best Film	Frost/Nixon	Won
Las Vegas Film Society	Best Screenplay	Peter Morgan	Won

== Historical accuracy ==
Both the film and the play take dramatic license with the on-air and behind-the-scene details of the Nixon interviews. Jonathan Aitken, one of Nixon's official biographers who spent much time with the former president at La Casa Pacifica, rebukes the film for its portrayal of a drunken Nixon making a late-night phone call as never having happened. Ron Howard discussed the scene on his feature commentary for the DVD release, pointing out it was a deliberate act of dramatic license, and while Frost never received such a phone call, "it was known that Richard Nixon, during ...the Watergate scandal, had occasionally made midnight phone calls that he couldn't very well recall the following day." Elizabeth Drew of the Huffington Post and author of Richard M. Nixon (2007) noted some inaccuracies, including a misrepresentation of the end of the interviews, the failure to mention the fact that Nixon received 20% of the profits from the interviews, and what she says are inaccurate representations of some of the characters. Drew points out a critical line in the movie that is particularly deceptive: Nixon admitted he "'...was involved in a 'cover-up,' as you call it.' The ellipsis is of course unknown to the audience, and is crucial: What Nixon actually said was, 'You're wanting me to say that I participated in an illegal cover-up. No!'"

According to a 2014 Baltimore Sun article by Jules Witcover, Nixon didn't admit his guilt until he was interviewed in 1983 by former White House aide Frank Gannon (played by Andy Milder in the film).

David Edelstein of New York wrote that the film overstates the importance of its basis, the Frost interviews, stating it "elevates the 1977 interviews Nixon gave (or, rather, sold, for an unheard-of $600,000) to British TV personality David Frost into a momentous event in the history of politics and media." Edelstein also noted that "with selective editing, Morgan makes it seem as if Frost got Nixon to admit more than he actually did." Edelstein wrote that the film "is brisk, well crafted, and enjoyable enough, but the characters seem thinner (Sheen is all frozen smiles and squirms) and the outcome less consequential."

Writing for the conservative National Review, Fred Schwarz, who deemed the Frost/Nixon interviews "a notorious fizzle", commented that, the film "is an attempt to use history, assisted by plenty of dramatic license, to retrospectively turn a loss into a win. By all accounts, Frost/Nixon does a fine job of dramatizing the negotiations and preparation that led up to the interviews. And it’s hard to imagine Frank Langella, who plays a Brezhnev-looking Nixon, giving a bad performance. Still, the movie’s fundamental premise is just plain wrong." Though generally approving, critic Daniel Eagan notes that partisans on both sides have questioned the accuracy of the film's script.

Caroline Cushing Graham, in a December 2008 interview, noted that her first trip with Frost was to the Muhammad Ali fight in Zaire, and that the two had been together for more than five years prior to when the film shows the two meeting. She remembered Frost as feeling that he did a pretty good job on every interview, whereas the film depicts him feeling he did a poor job with the first two interviews. She added that while the movie shows Frost driving, in fact they were always chauffeured because he was always making notes for the work he was doing.

Diane Sawyer, portrayed in the film in her role as one of Nixon's researchers, said in December 2008 that, "Jack Brennan is portrayed as a stern military guy," citing both the play and what she'd heard about the film version. "And he’s the funniest guy you ever met in your life, an irreverent, wonderful guy. So there you go. It's the movies."
