= Irving Paul Lazar =

American lawyer (1907–1993)

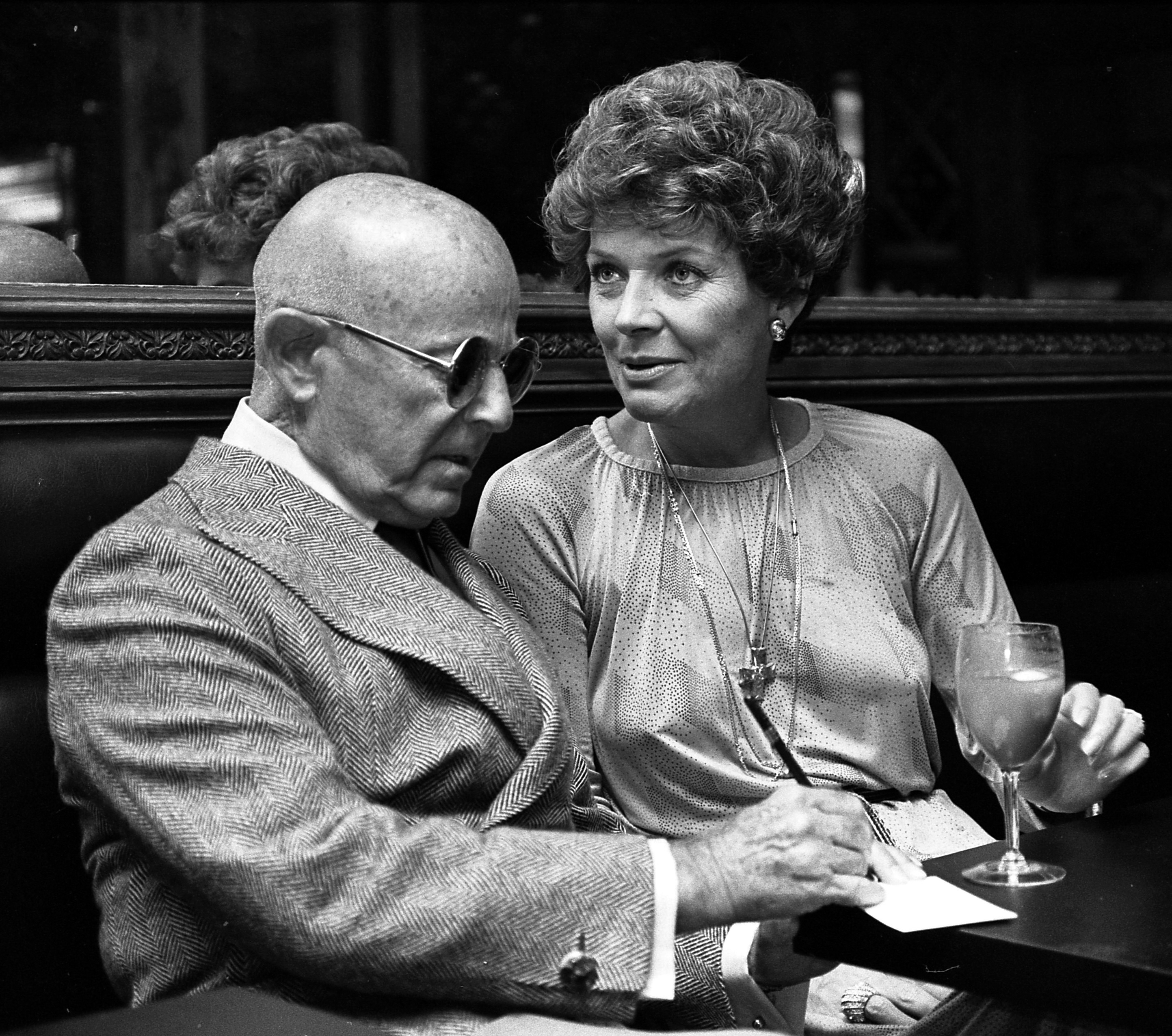
Irving Lazar and Polly Bergen

Irving Paul "Swifty" Lazar (born Samuel Lazar; March 28, 1907 – December 30, 1993) was an American lawyer, talent agent and dealmaker, representing both movie stars and authors (including Richard Nixon).

== Early life and education ==
Samuel Lazar was born to a Jewish family in Brooklyn, New York. He graduated from Fordham University and Brooklyn Law School in 1931. While practicing bankruptcy law during the early 1930s, he negotiated a business deal for a vaudeville performer Ted Lewis, and realized the income potential for acting as an agent.

== Career ==
Lazar moved to Hollywood in 1936 but maintained a presence in New York until after World War II when he moved to Los Angeles permanently. After putting together three major deals for Humphrey Bogart in a single day, he was dubbed "Swifty" by Bogart.

In addition to Bogart, Lazar became the agent representing other celebrities, including Lauren Bacall, Truman Capote, Cher, Joan Collins, Noël Coward, Ira Gershwin, Cary Grant, Moss Hart, Ernest Hemingway, Gene Kelly, Arthur Schlesinger, Jr., Madonna, Walter Matthau, Larry McMurtry, Vladimir Nabokov, Clifford Odets, Cole Porter, William Saroyan, Irwin Shaw, President Richard Nixon and Tennessee Williams. Lazar's power became such that he could negotiate a deal for someone who was not even his client and then collect a fee from that person's agent. Oscar Levant said of Lazar, "Everybody who matters has two agents: his own and Irving Lazar."

During World War II, Lazar, with Benjamin Landis, suggested to the U.S. Army Air Forces that it produce a play to encourage enlistment and to raise funds for the Army Emergency Relief Fund. The Air Forces commanding general, Henry H. Arnold, agreed and the play Winged Victory was written by Moss Hart and produced by Hart and Lazar. It was a huge success, playing on Broadway and on tour around the U.S. for over a million people in 1943. The 1944 film adaptation was directed by George Cukor.

During the 1950s Lazar expanded from Hollywood deal-making to doing book publishing deals.

Lazar was an executive producer (with Bernie Brillstein) of John G. Avildsen's Neighbors (1981), starring John Belushi and Dan Aykroyd, and he was an associate producer on two television miniseries, The Thorn Birds (1983) and Robert Kennedy & His Times (1985).

In 1988, a party was thrown for Lazar at a nightclub where Chazz Palminteri, who was then a struggling actor, was working as a bouncer. Lazar tried to enter and was stopped by Palminteri, who did not know who he was. Lazar got him fired, which led the broke (and unemployed) actor to write something for himself to star in since he was not being offered anything, and was inspired to write A Bronx Tale.

Later in his career, Lazar sustained his fame (and influence) throughout the entertainment industry for his Oscar night parties. For any celebrity who wished to remain on the Hollywood A-list, being seen at "Swifty's Party" was deemed as important as making an appearance at the official Governor's Ball. During this period, Lazar's image became associated with his comically oversized, thick-framed black glasses, which combined with his short stature and bald head created his signature appearance. His look became synonymous with the stereotypical caricature of a Hollywood power broker and deal-maker.

=== Some notable clients of Lazar ===
- Cary Grant
- Cher
- Clifford Odets
- Cole Porter
- Dominique Lapierre
- Ernest Hemingway
- Garson Kanin
- Gene Kelly
- Herman Wouk
- Humphrey Bogart
- Ira Gershwin
- Irwin Shaw
- Joan Collins
- Larry Collins
- Larry McMurtry
- Lauren Bacall
- Madonna
- Moss Hart
- Noël Coward
- Richard Nixon
- Tennessee Williams
- Truman Capote
- Vladimir Nabokov
- Walter Matthau
- William Saroyan

== Personal life ==
Lazar married Mary Van Nuys, a model, in 1962.

== Death ==
Lazar died in 1993, aged 86, from complications stemming from diabetes, which had cut off circulation to his feet. Doctors wanted to amputate, but Lazar, who was being treated at home via peritoneal dialysis, refused. This refusal hastened Lazar's death. He was interred in the Westwood Village Memorial Park Cemetery in Westwood, Los Angeles next to his wife who had died in January that same year from liver cancer.

== Legacy ==
At the time of his death, Lazar was working on his autobiography, Swifty: My Life and Good Times, which was completed by Annette Tapert and published by Simon & Schuster in 1995. In 1999 Simon & Schuster editor-in-chief Michael Korda published his memoirs, entitled Another Life: A Memoir of Other People. It has a chapter about Lazar.

Lazar appears as a character in Peter Morgan's stage play Frost/Nixon, first staged at the Donmar Warehouse, London on August 10, 2006, and played by actor Kerry Shale. In the play, Lazar negotiates a deal with David Frost on behalf of President Richard Nixon for Frost to interview Nixon. The play is closely based on real-life events. He was also portrayed by Toby Jones in the 2008 film version of Frost/Nixon. Swifty Lazar also appeared, thinly disguised as Irving "Sneaky" LaSalle, in George Axelrod's 1956 take on Dr. Faustus, the play Will Success Spoil Rock Hunter? where Sneaky as an agent, will get his clients absolutely anything they want for 10% of their soul. The Lazar role was played on Broadway by Martin Gabel. Lazar was parodied on The Muppet Show as Fozzie Bear's agent, Irving Bizarre, who was so short that he appeared only as a top hat atop a pair of shoes. He also appears briefly in the 1985 British novel Paradise Postponed by John Mortimer.

With regard to another representation of Lazar in a major theatrical release, actor Burgess Meredith modeled his screen character after the talent agent in the American 1978 psychological horror film Magic. Meredith for his role adopted some of Lazar's mannerisms and even shaved his head to look like him. "I tried", the actor stated in a 1978 interview with The New York Times, "to get his cool, understated manner, his sharp clothes, and most of all, his way of speaking softly so that you've got to lean over to hear what he's saying".
