= Robert Zelnick =

American journalist (1940–2019)

- Born: Carl Robert Zelnick; August 9, 1940; New York City, U.S.
- Died: September 23, 2019 (aged 79); Newton, Massachusetts, U.S.
- Education: Cornell University
- Occupations: Journalist; Author; Professor
- Known for: Executive editor, Frost–Nixon interviews

Carl Robert Zelnick (August 9, 1940 – September 23, 2019) was an American journalist, author and professor of journalism at the Boston University College of Communication, and winner of two Emmy Awards and two Gavel Awards.

== Career ==
Early in his career, Zelnick worked for The Christian Science Monitor, National Public Radio, and the Anchorage Daily News, and was executive editor of the Frost–Nixon interviews. (In the 2008 film Frost/Nixon, Zelnick is portrayed by Oliver Platt.)

He was a correspondent for ABC News for more than 20 years. His assignments included national political and congressional affairs (1994–98), the Pentagon (1986–94), Israel (1984–86) and Moscow (1982–84).

In 1998, he began teaching at Boston University, where he chaired the journalism department from 2002 to 2006.

He was a research fellow at Stanford University's Hoover Institution.

== Life ==
Zelnick was convicted in 2013 of misdemeanor negligent motor vehicle homicide and the civil infraction of failure to yield for an incident in October 2011, when he struck and killed a motorcyclist in Plymouth, Massachusetts.

He was of Jewish descent.

== Books ==
- The Illusion of Net Neutrality: Political Alarmism, Regulatory Creep, and the Real End to Internet Freedom (2013), coauthored with his daughter, Eva Zelnick
- Israel's Unilateralism: Beyond Gaza (2006)
- Swing Dance: Justice O'Connor and the Michigan Muddle (2004)
- Winning Florida: How the Bush Team Fought the Battle (2001)
- Gore: A Political Life (2000)
- Backfire: A Reporter's Look at Affirmative Action (1996)
