= Riviera Holdings =

American casino operator

Riviera Holdings Corporation
- Industry: Resorts
- Founded: 1993
- Defunct: 2011
- Headquarters: Winchester, Nevada

Riviera Holdings Corporation is a defunct casino operator that was based in Winchester, Nevada. It owned two casinos: the Riviera on the Las Vegas Strip, closed in 2015; and the Riviera Black Hawk in Black Hawk, Colorado, sold in 2011.

== History ==
Riviera Holdings Corporation was formed in 1993, after the Riviera resort on the Las Vegas Strip emerged from Chapter 11 bankruptcy. Riviera opened its second casino, in Black Hawk, Colorado, in February 2000.

In June 2002, Riviera Holdings was chosen by officials in Jefferson County, Missouri, who wanted the company to construct and operate a casino approximately 60 miles south of St. Louis. In July 2002, Donald Trump purchased a 9.8-percent stake in Riviera Holdings for $2.2 million. Trump made the purchase for "investment purposes," and said that he had no plans to purchase or to operate the company's Riviera casino in Las Vegas. By that point, U.S. Trust Company of California had also purchased a 9.4-percent stake in the company. By January 2003, Trump had purchased additional shares in the company, putting his ownership above 10 percent, which required him to apply for a Nevada gaming license.

In March 2003, investor Fabrizio Boccardi had offered to purchase the company for $30 million, but was rejected. His purchase would have included the assumption of $216 million in debt. In July 2003, shareholders voted to end the company's "poison pill", to attract potential partners. At that time, the company had plans for a casino in New Mexico.

After Trump gained a Nevada gaming license in February 2004, he subsequently sold his shares of the company on April 5, 2004. Company chairman Bill Westerman said that Trump purchased the shares solely to obtain a Nevada gaming license.

As of October, 2005 the company had $200 million in annual revenues and 1,600 employees.

On April 6, 2006, Riviera Acquisition Holdings announced a $427 million buy out offer that has been accepted. The offer included cash and assumption of existing debt. But on August 29, shareholders rejected the offer, after an acquisition company affiliated with BT Holdings LLC of Boston, Massachusetts made an offer of $20 a share.

Facing losses from the recession, Riviera began defaulting on its debt in February 2009. In July 2010, Riviera filed for Chapter 11 bankruptcy protection, listing $275 million in debt. A reorganization plan led by Starwood Capital Group enabled the Riviera properties to remain open for business. Starwood emerged with a 75% stake in Riviera, with another 21% held by Derek Stevens, owner of the Golden Gate casino.

In September 2011, Riviera agreed to sell its Black Hawk casino for $76 million to Monarch Casino & Resort, owner of the Atlantis Casino Resort in Reno.
