= Monarch Casino Resort Spa =

Casino resort in the United States

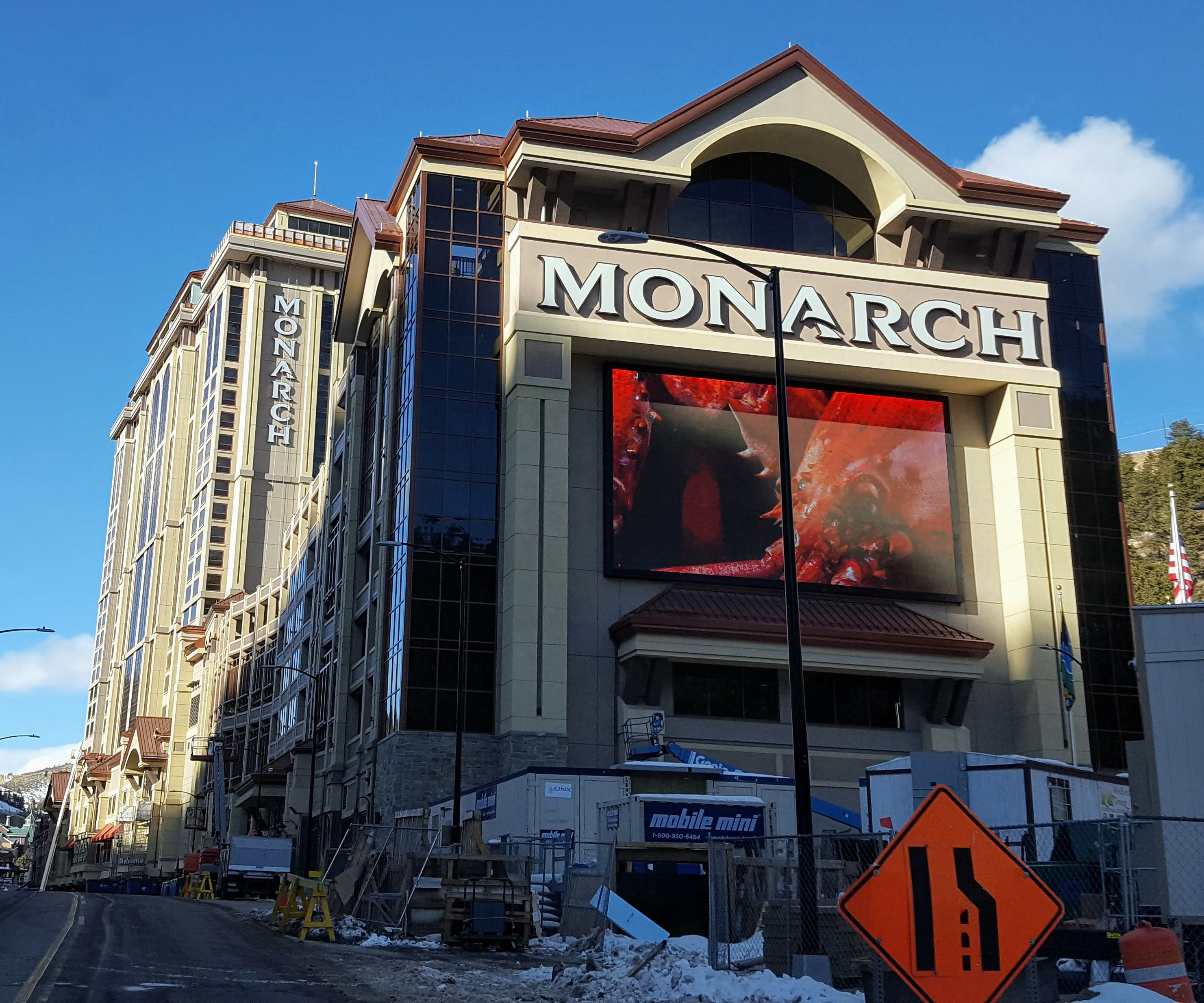
- The Monarch in December 2019, during expansion work
- Interactive map of Monarch Casino Resort Spa
- Location: Black Hawk, Colorado; 488 Main Street; 39.798464°N 105.482379°W
- Opened: February 4, 2000
- No. of rooms: 516
- Gaming space: 64,000 sq ft (5,900 m^{2})
- Owner: Monarch Casino & Resort Inc.
- Previous names: Riviera Black Hawk (2000–2013); Monarch Casino Black Hawk (2013–2020)
- Renovated in: 2020
- Website: monarchblackhawk.com

Monarch Casino Resort Spa is a casino resort in Black Hawk, Colorado. It is owned and operated by Monarch Casino & Resort Inc. The property includes a 64,000 sq ft (5,900 m^{2}) casino and a 23-story hotel tower with 516 rooms.

The casino opened on February 4, 2000, as the Riviera Black Hawk, and originally lacked a hotel. It was developed by Riviera Holdings, which also owned the Riviera hotel-casino in Las Vegas. In 2012, the Riviera Black Hawk was sold to Monarch, which rebranded it the following year. A renovation and expansion began in 2015, and eventually concluded in 2022, after construction delays. The $442 million project included the addition of hotel rooms and more casino space, both debuting in November 2020.

== History ==
=== Early years (2000–2012) ===
The resort began as the Riviera Black Hawk, and was the second gaming property by Riviera Holdings, which also owned and operated the Riviera hotel-casino in Las Vegas. Construction on the Black Hawk location was underway in 1998. It had a soft opening on February 4, 2000, with an official grand opening the following month. The Riviera Black Hawk cost $75 million. The casino featured table games, 1,000 slot machines, a 490-seat entertainment venue, a buffet, and a coffee shop. Unlike its Las Vegas counterpart, the Black Hawk property lacked a hotel.

Riviera Holdings filed for Chapter 11 bankruptcy in 2010, and announced a year later that it would sell the Riviera Black Hawk to focus on its Las Vegas property. The Black Hawk location was sold to Monarch Casino & Resort Inc., owner of the Atlantis Casino Resort in Reno, Nevada. The $76 million sale was finalized in April 2012. Monarch also bought 1.5 acres of vacant land, just east of the Riviera, for future development. With 988 rooms in Black Hawk, Monarch considered the local hotel market to be in need of expansion. This was a primary factor in purchasing the Riviera, which was among the largest casinos in Black Hawk at the time, with 750 slot machines.

=== Name changes and expansion (2013–present) ===
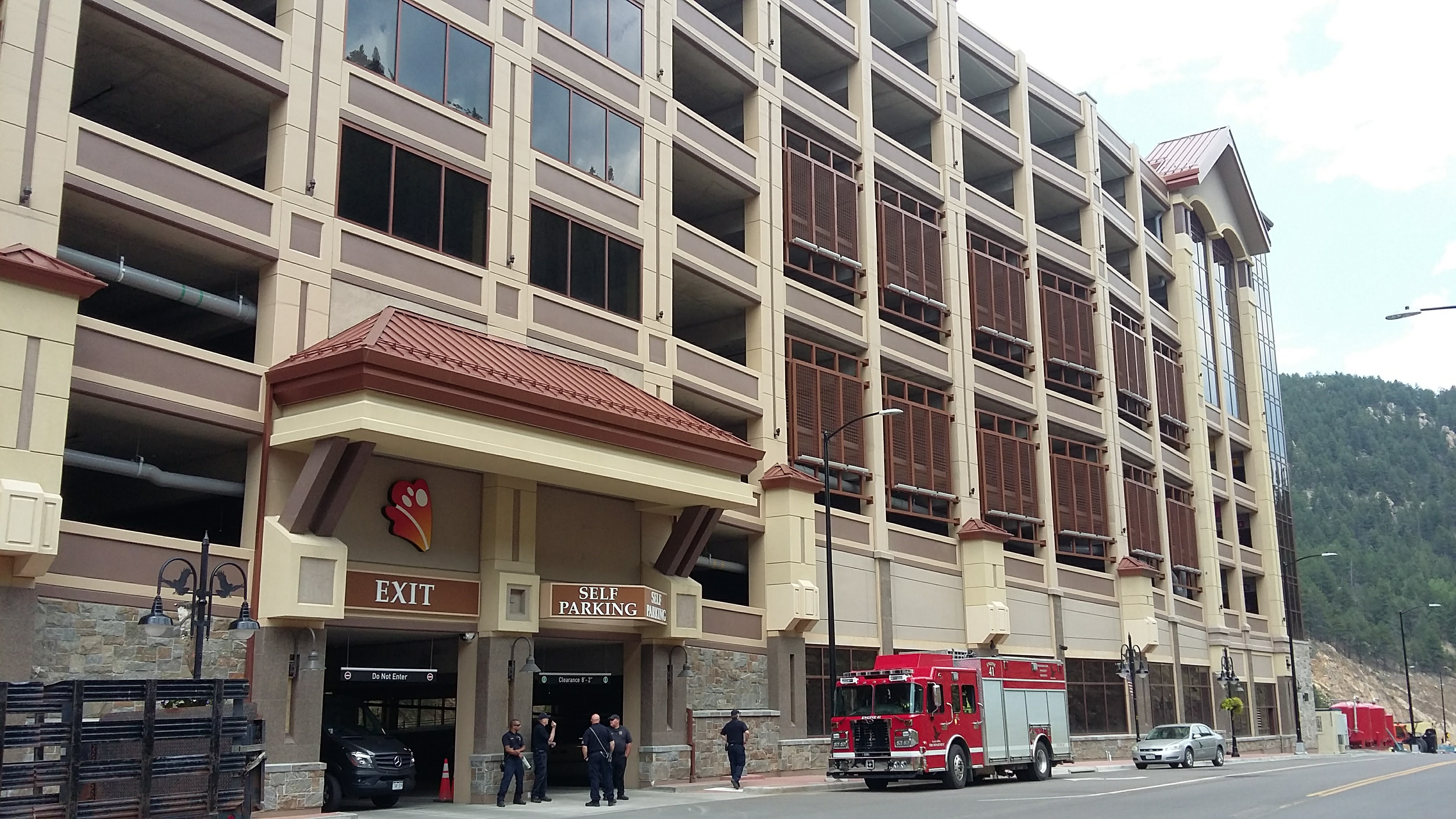
New parking garage in 2017

The property was renamed the Monarch Casino Black Hawk in October 2013. A $295 million renovation and expansion was launched in 2015, starting with a new, nine-story parking garage on the property's east side. After its completion, the existing garage was imploded in December 2016, making way for a hotel tower. The expansion project also included additional casino space.

The renovation and expansion, when originally announced, was expected to conclude by the end of 2017. However, it would go on to be disrupted by construction delays. The 23-story tower was eventually topped off in January 2019, and work on the overall property was expected to finish later in the year. The tower was designed by MBA Architecture and Interior Design, and built by PCL Construction.

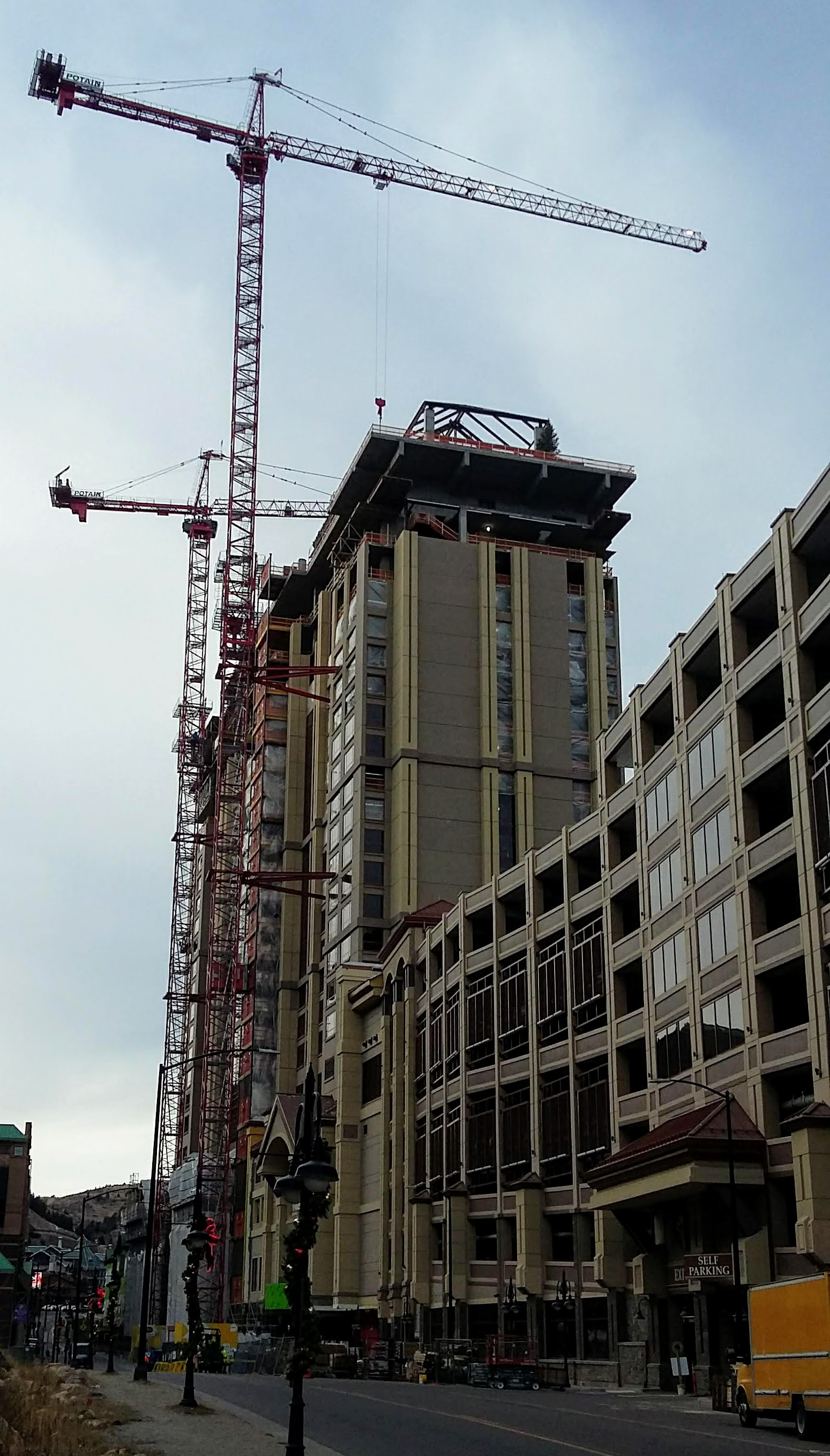
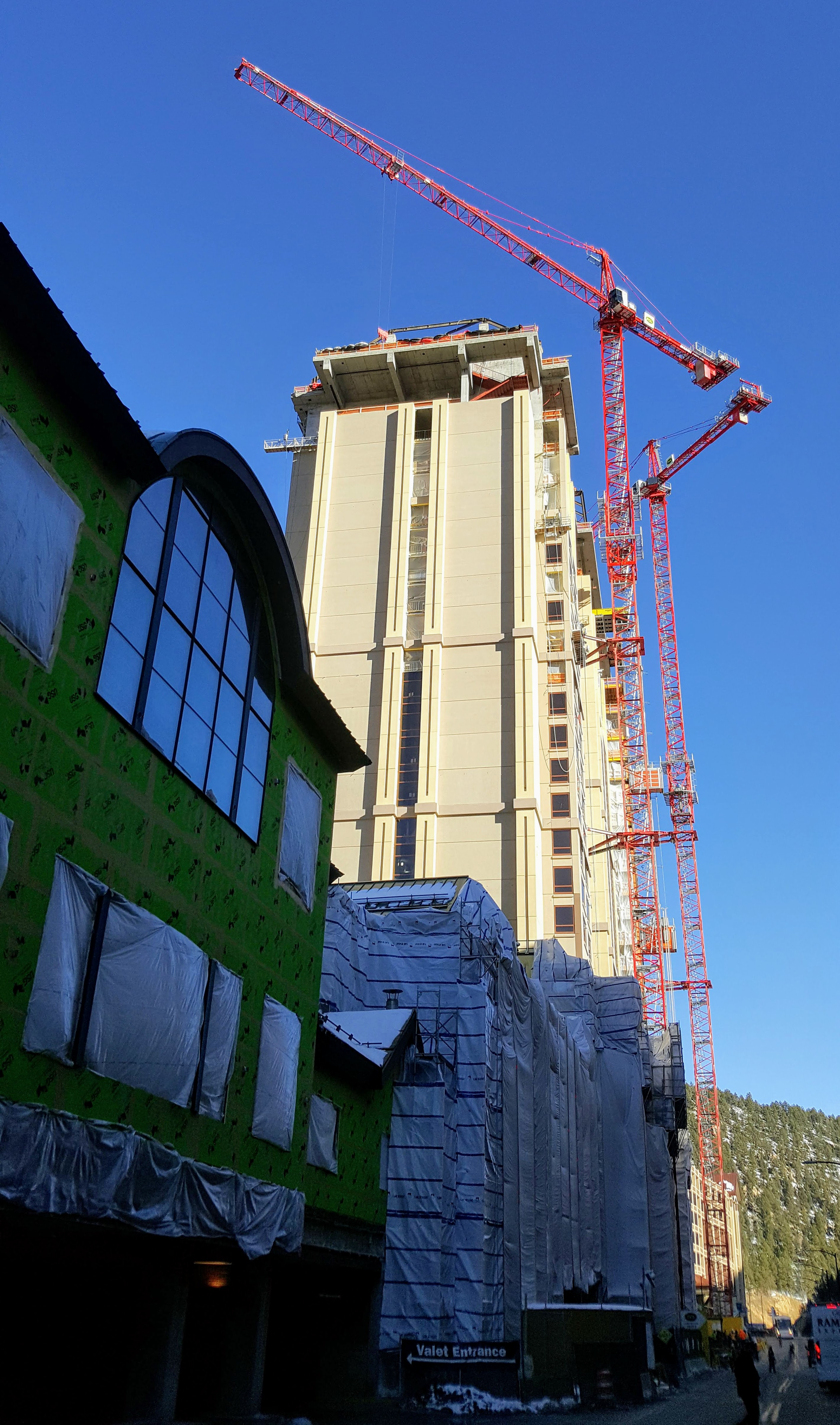
Construction of the hotel tower

Monarch's relationship with PCL deteriorated due to the delays, and the contractor sued Monarch later in 2019, citing breach of contract and other issues. The suit concerned cost overruns brought on by problems encountered during construction. PCL alleged that Monarch repeatedly declined to approve a guaranteed maximum price, and Monarch called the suit "an attempt to deflect attention from [PCL's] failures to deliver the completed project in a timely and cost appropriate manner." Monarch later sued PCL in 2023, over hotel defects, and PCL subsequently stated that the expansion project "went off the rails" due to micromanagement.

The 2019 opening of the new facilities was eventually delayed until the following year, with the new casino space opening on November 19, 2020. The hotel portion began a phased opening starting six days later. The property, renamed Monarch Casino Resort Spa, includes 516 rooms. It competes against the 536-room Ameristar Black Hawk. The Monarch is the first gaming property encountered by motorists entering from the city's south side. It is the area's second high-end resort after Ameristar, which originally opened in 2001 and added a hotel in 2009.

The existing casino structure remained in operation throughout the expansion project, and was renovated thereafter. Casino space was nearly doubled with the 35,000 sq ft (3,300 m^{2}) addition, for a total of 64,000 sq ft (5,900 m^{2}). The casino has 1,100 slot machines and a sportsbook. Other new features included a rooftop pool, a spa, and several restaurants. Work on the property concluded in March 2022, at a final cost of $442 million. The new and renovated areas were designed to emulate resorts in Las Vegas. The expanded property employed 1,000 people, and is Monarch's second resort.

== Awards & accolades ==
Monarch Casino Resort Spa has received national and regional hospitality, travel, and gaming industry honors, including:

- USA TODAY 10Best Readers' Choice Awards: In 2026, Spa Monarch was ranked No. 1 Best Hotel Spa in the United States, following placements among the nation's top hotel spas each year since 2023.
- AAA Four Diamond Hotel: Monarch Casino Resort Spa received the AAA Four Diamond Hotel designation in 2025, recognizing its upscale accommodations, hospitality, and service.
- Wine Spectator Restaurant Awards: In 2026, Monarch Chophouse earned the Best of Award of Excellence, while Bistro Mariposa received the Award of Excellence for the third consecutive year after having first earned the recognition in 2024.
- Westword Best of Denver Readers' Choice Awards: In 2026, Monarch Casino Resort Spa was named Best Hotel and Best Casino, while Monarch Chophouse earned Best Steakhouse.
- Newsweek Readers' Choice Awards: Monarch Casino Resort Spa ranked No. 4 in the Best Overall Casino Outside Las Vegas category in 2024 and No. 5 in 2025. In the 2026 awards, Monarch Rewards, the loyalty program serving both Monarch Casino Resort Spa and its sister property, Atlantis Casino Resort Spa, ranked No. 3 nationally in the Best Casino Players Club category.
