= Monarch Casino & Resort, Inc. =

American gaming company

Monarch Casino & Resort, Inc. is an American gaming and hospitality company headquartered in Reno, Nevada. The company owns and operates Atlantis Casino Resort Spa in Reno and Monarch Casino Resort Spa in Black Hawk, Colorado. The company was founded in 1993 and is publicly traded on the Nasdaq Stock Market as MCRI.
