= Riviera (hotel and casino) =

Former casino hotel in Las Vegas, Nevada

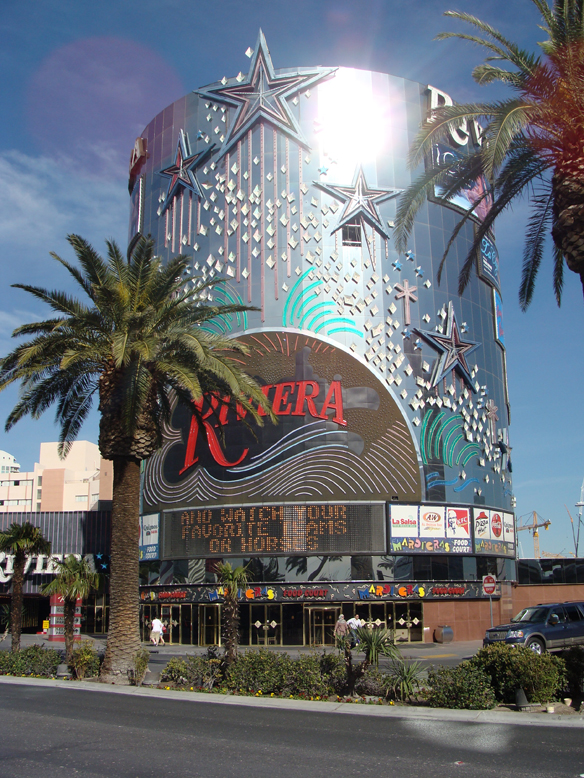
- Riviera facade in 2008

- Location within Las Vegas Strip Location within Nevada
- Interactive map of Riviera
- Location: Winchester, Nevada; 2901 South Las Vegas Boulevard; 36.135°N 115.162°W
- Opened: April 20, 1955; 71 years ago
- Closed: May 4, 2015; 11 years ago
- No. of rooms: 2,075
- Gaming space: 103,800 sq ft (9,640 m^{2})
- Permanent shows: An Evening at La Cage (1985–2009); Crazy Girls (1987–2015); Splash (1985–2006)
- Casino type: Land-based
- Owner: Riviera Holdings (1993–2015); Las Vegas Convention and Visitors Authority (2015–16)
- Operating license holder: Paragon Gaming (2013–2015)
- Architect: Roy France and Son, Welton Becket, Harold Levitt, Martin Stern Jr.
- Renovated in: 1960, 1966, 1975, 1977, 1988-1990, 1999, 2012

The Riviera (colloquially, "the Riv") was a hotel and casino on the northern Las Vegas Strip in Winchester, Nevada. It opened on April 20, 1955, and included a nine-story hotel featuring 291 rooms. The Riviera was the first skyscraper in the Las Vegas Valley, and was the area's tallest building until 1956. Various hotel additions would be made in later years, including a 12-story tower in 1966, a 17-story tower in 1975, and a 24-story tower in 1988. By the time of its closure in 2015, the resort included a 103,800 sq ft (9,640 m^{2}) casino and 2,075 rooms.

In 1973, the Riviera was sold to businessman Meshulam Riklis, who owned it for the next two decades. The Riviera filed for bankruptcy in 1983, and targeted a middle-class demographic from that point on, which helped the property thrive. Changes included the addition of a Burger King in 1984, making the Riviera the first Strip property to feature a fast-food restaurant.

The Riviera emerged from bankruptcy in 1985, but filed again in 1991, amid an expansion project which went over budget. The property emerged in 1993, under the new ownership of Riviera Holdings Corporation. The property's convention space was expanded in the late 1990s, which helped keep the resort profitable. The Riviera was also host to a variety of live entertainment, including female impersonator Frank Marino (1985–2009) and a topless revue known as Crazy Girls (1987–2015).

In February 2015, the Las Vegas Convention and Visitors Authority (LVCVA) purchased the 26-acre (11 ha) Riviera, at a cost of $191 million. The agency had plans to demolish the resort for a major expansion of its nearby Las Vegas Convention Center. The Riviera closed on May 4, 2015, and demolition was underway a year later. The 24-story tower was imploded on June 14, 2016, followed by the 12- and 17-story towers on August 16, 2016. The LVCVA's plans for the property changed after it acquired other nearby acreage. The new convention space was built on the Riviera's eastern portion, while 10 acres (4.0 ha) along the Strip were put up for sale in 2019.

== History ==
=== Development ===
The Riviera was originally known as the Casa Blanca prior to the start of construction. It was proposed by a group of businessmen, mostly from Miami Beach, who applied for a gaming license in December 1952. Among the group members was William "Lefty Clark" Bischoff, who previously ran casino operations in Detroit. Bischoff was to hold a 40-percent interest in the Casa Blanca. However, he had been identified a few years earlier, during the Kefauver Committee hearings, as having ties to organized crime. He subsequently withdrew his name from the group's license application.

Two other investors, Miami contractor Julius Gaines and Hollywood producer Lewis Merman, also withdrew because of concern over their affiliation with Charles Tourine, who had a criminal record. Samuel Cohen, a Miami businessman, joined the Casa Blanca project in early 1953 as a financier. He was later identified as a member of Miami's S & G gambling syndicate and would be removed from the project as well, although rumors persisted that he secretly maintained an involvement.

A new list of prospective owners, eliminating all but two of the original investors, was submitted to the Nevada Tax Commission in July 1953. The group, at that time, consisted of eight partners. Among them were brothers David and Myer Gensburg, and brothers Harpo and Gummo Marx. The group was granted a gaming license in September 1953.

The Riviera was built along the northern Las Vegas Strip, at a cost of $8.5 million. Construction began in May 1954. The project was designed by Roy France and Son, an architecture firm based in Miami Beach, with J. Maher Weller as associate architect. The general contractor was Taylor Construction Company, also of Miami.

=== Early years ===
The Riviera opened on April 20, 1955, and included a nine-story hotel tower. Its debut coincided with that of two other Strip resorts, the Dunes and the Royal Nevada, prompting concerns that Las Vegas had been overbuilt with hotels. Mob fixer Sidney Korshak played a major role in the property's management. Law enforcement agencies suspected that he represented the Chicago Outfit's interest in the Riviera, and was responsible for skimming the casino's revenue and delivering the proceeds to Chicago. This, combined with poor management by the inexperienced Miami group, resulted in significant financial losses for the Riviera.

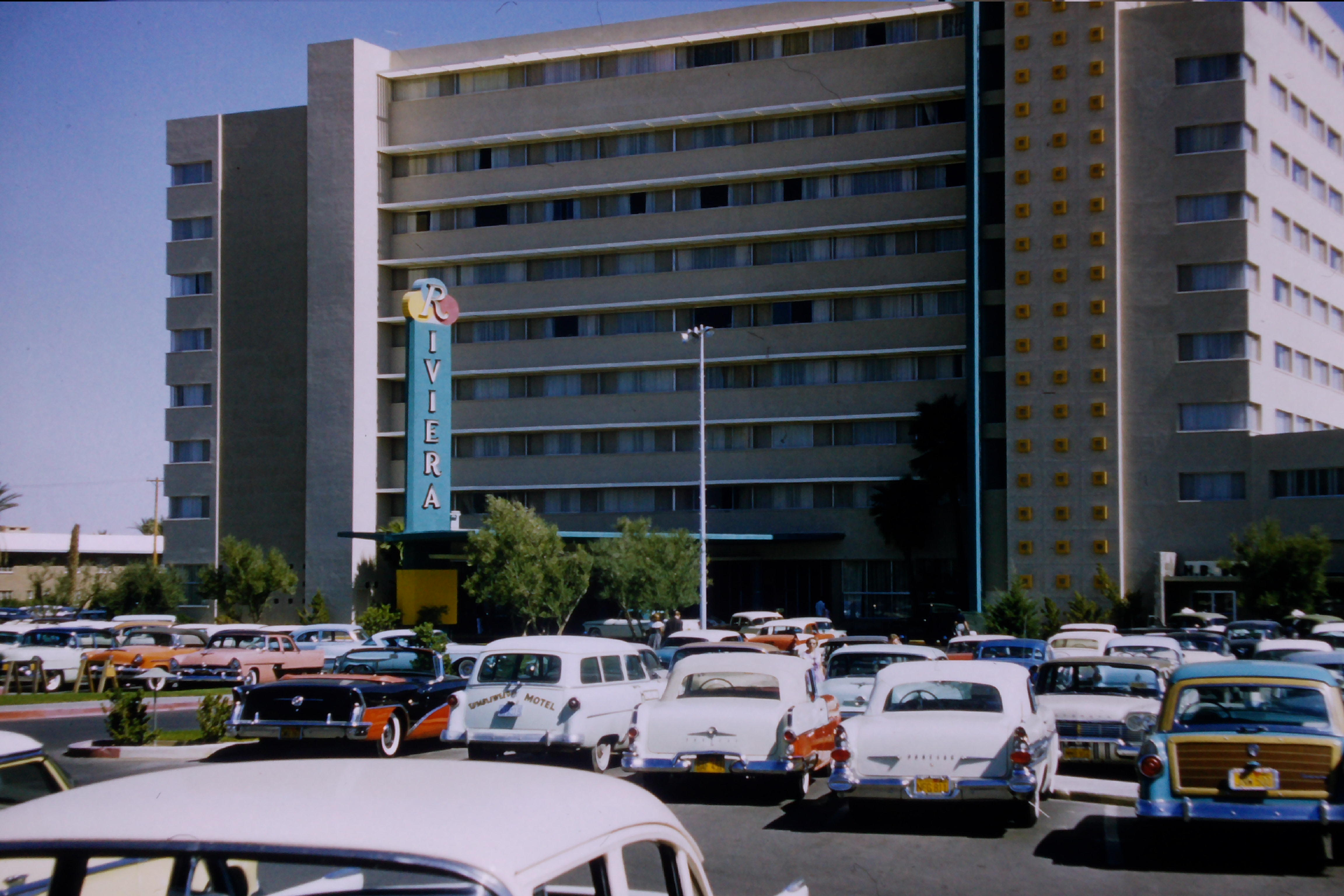
Northern end of the Riviera property, 1957

A group of former Flamingo Hotel managers, led by Gus Greenbaum, soon took over operation of the Riviera, leasing it from the ownership group. Greenbaum had recently retired, and it was widely suspected that he was coerced to return to work by threats from Chicago mob boss Tony Accardo. Among Greenbaum's staff was entertainment director William Nelson, who was soon discovered to be mob informer Willie Bioff, leading to his murder in November 1955. Greenbaum hired Ed Becker, who became the entertainment director.

Greenbaum's drug and gambling addictions led to his embezzling from the casino. In December 1958, he and his wife were murdered in their Phoenix, Arizona home, reportedly on the orders of either Meyer Lansky or Accardo. Ben Goffstein took Greenbaum's place as president. In 1960, the Riviera purchased a 15-percent interest held by the estate of Greenbaum, which retained a 17-percent stake after the sale. The estate's remaining interest was bought a year later. Sid Wyman, a Las Vegas casino executive, also decided to sell his interest back to the Riviera.

=== Expansion and owner changes ===
Several hotel expansions would take place, including the addition of a 12-story tower in 1966. Two years later, the Riviera was purchased by a new group, which included bankers E. Parry Thomas and Jerome Mack. The group also consisted of investors tied to the Parvin-Dohrmann Corp., which owned the Aladdin, Stardust, and Fremont casinos. In 1969, a deal was made to sell the Riviera to Parvin-Dohrmann, but the sale was blocked by the Nevada Gaming Control Board, due to the company's previous failure to report a change of ownership.

Edward Torres was among the new ownership group and managed resort operations. Dean Martin was hired in 1969 to perform in the casino's showroom, and was given a 10% interest in the Riviera. Martin left in 1972, after Torres refused his request to cut his performance schedule from two nightly shows to one; the Riviera bought back his shares.

In 1973, the Riviera was purchased for $60 million by AITS Inc., a Boston-based travel company controlled by Meshulam Riklis and Isidore Becker. Riklis was majority owner, while Becker would later serve as president of the property. A 17-story tower was added in 1975.

The Riviera eventually suffered financial problems in part because of the early 1980s recession, and also due to competition from new casinos in Atlantic City, where gambling had been legalized. The property filed for Chapter 11 bankruptcy protection in 1983. Riklis pledged money to keep the Riviera in operation, and replaced Becker with Jeffrey Silver to turn the business around. Silver began shifting the Riviera's marketing focus away from high rollers, and towards middle- and working-class gamblers. The property emerged from bankruptcy in 1985.

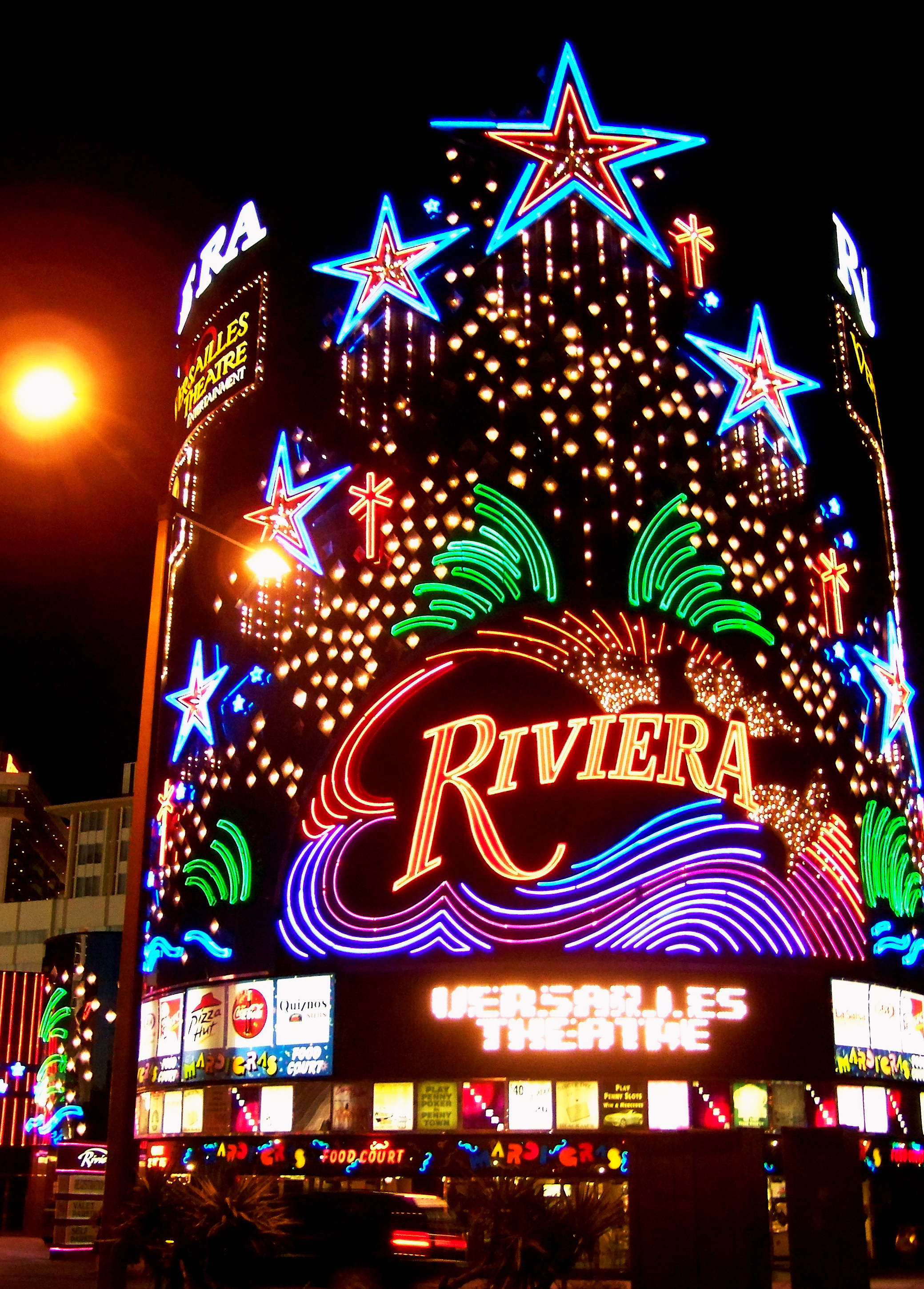
Southern end of the Riviera and its billboard facade, 2007

The Riviera underwent an expansion from 1988 to 1990, which included a neon billboard facade along the Strip. The resort was evacuated when a three-alarm fire occurred during 1989, in a new casino area that was under construction. Lumber had ignited due to sparks from a welder's torch, and the fire caused $3.5 million in damage. It was confined to the new addition, although smoke blackened the property's original hotel tower.

Aside from the new casino space, the expansion project also added a 24-story tower. There were plans to eventually add a 43-story tower and an indoor amusement park, although these never materialized; the prior expansion work had gone significantly over budget, leading the parent company to file again for Chapter 11 bankruptcy protection in 1991. The business emerged in 1993 as Riviera Holdings Corporation, owned by the previous secured creditors. Riklis was no longer involved with the property.

In 1997, businessman Allen Paulson agreed to acquire the Riviera, but backed out of the deal a year later, stating that adequate financial information had not been disclosed. Riviera Holdings sued him in response, and the case was settled in 1999.

=== Final years ===
Despite its age and financial problems, the Riviera would remain popular as a middle-class property through the 2000s, especially in contrast to newer megaresorts being built on the Strip. Riviera Holdings opened a Colorado location, the Riviera Black Hawk, in 2000, owning it for more than a decade. The company considered expanding the brand elsewhere as well.

Prospective buyers for the Las Vegas location became more frequent in the 2000s, as development of the nearby Wynn resort was expected to help revitalize the northern Strip. In 2003, Italian investor Fabrizio Boccardi made an offer for Riviera Holdings, which rejected his bid. By that time, businessman Donald Trump had bought a 10-percent stake in the company, prompting speculation that he would take over the resort. However, Trump simply viewed the property as an investment, and bought into the company only to acquire a Nevada gaming license for potential projects in the future. He sold his shares in 2004. The company D. E. Shaw, one of the largest shareholders in Riviera Holdings, made a buyout offer later that year, but was also rejected. A group of businessmen, including Barry Sternlicht and Neil Bluhm, agreed to buy into the company in 2005, with plans to renovate the Riviera. The buyout ultimately failed, as D. E. Shaw opposed the group's $426 million offer, finding it too low.

In 2005, the Riviera celebrated its 50th anniversary, a rare milestone for Strip properties. According to Michael Green, a professor at the College of Southern Nevada, the Riviera's "survival is one of the most interesting parts of its story, just because 50 years later it's still there and geographically it's on a part of the Strip that hasn't done as well as the part south of The Mirage." Hal Rothman, a history professor at the University of Nevada, Las Vegas, said of the Riviera: "It never quite had the pizzazz of the Sands with the Rat Pack. There was never a moment when it was a signature property. It was a good, solid hotel, but it was never the leader of the pack."

The Riviera began targeting customers disappointed by the closure of nearby casinos, such as the Westward Ho in 2005, and the Stardust in 2006. However, the closure of these properties, and that of the New Frontier in 2007, further reduced visitation to the northern Strip. The Riviera was expected to benefit from two nearby projects, Echelon Place and Fontainebleau Las Vegas, but construction on both had been suspended by the end of 2009, due to the Great Recession. Visitation to the area was further reduced a few years later, following the temporary closure of the Sahara.

Riviera Holdings filed for Chapter 11 bankruptcy in 2010, and emerged the following year through a deal with Sternlicht and other investors. His company, Starwood Capital Group, gained a 75-percent interest in Riviera Holdings, while local casino owner Derek Stevens owned 21 percent. Following Starwood's takeover, prospective buyers continued to look at the Riviera, but were turned off by the amount of money needed to renovate it in line with modern resorts. David A. Siegel was among those who considered a purchase, but found the property to be "a dump," instead buying the nearby LVH resort. Various renovations were launched across the property and underway by 2012. Amid continued financial losses, Paragon Gaming was hired to take over casino operations in 2013, while Riviera Holdings remained as owner.

=== Closure and demolition ===
In February 2013, the Las Vegas Convention and Visitors Authority (LVCVA) announced plans for a major expansion of its nearby Las Vegas Convention Center. On February 20, 2015, the LVCVA voted to purchase the resort from Riviera Holdings for $191 million, taking ownership immediately. The agency planned to demolish the resort to help make way for the new convention space. In the meantime, the Riviera was leased back to Paragon Gaming for the remainder of its operational history. The sale came less than two weeks after rumors emerged about the LVCVA acquiring the Riviera. The resort had 1,000 employees.

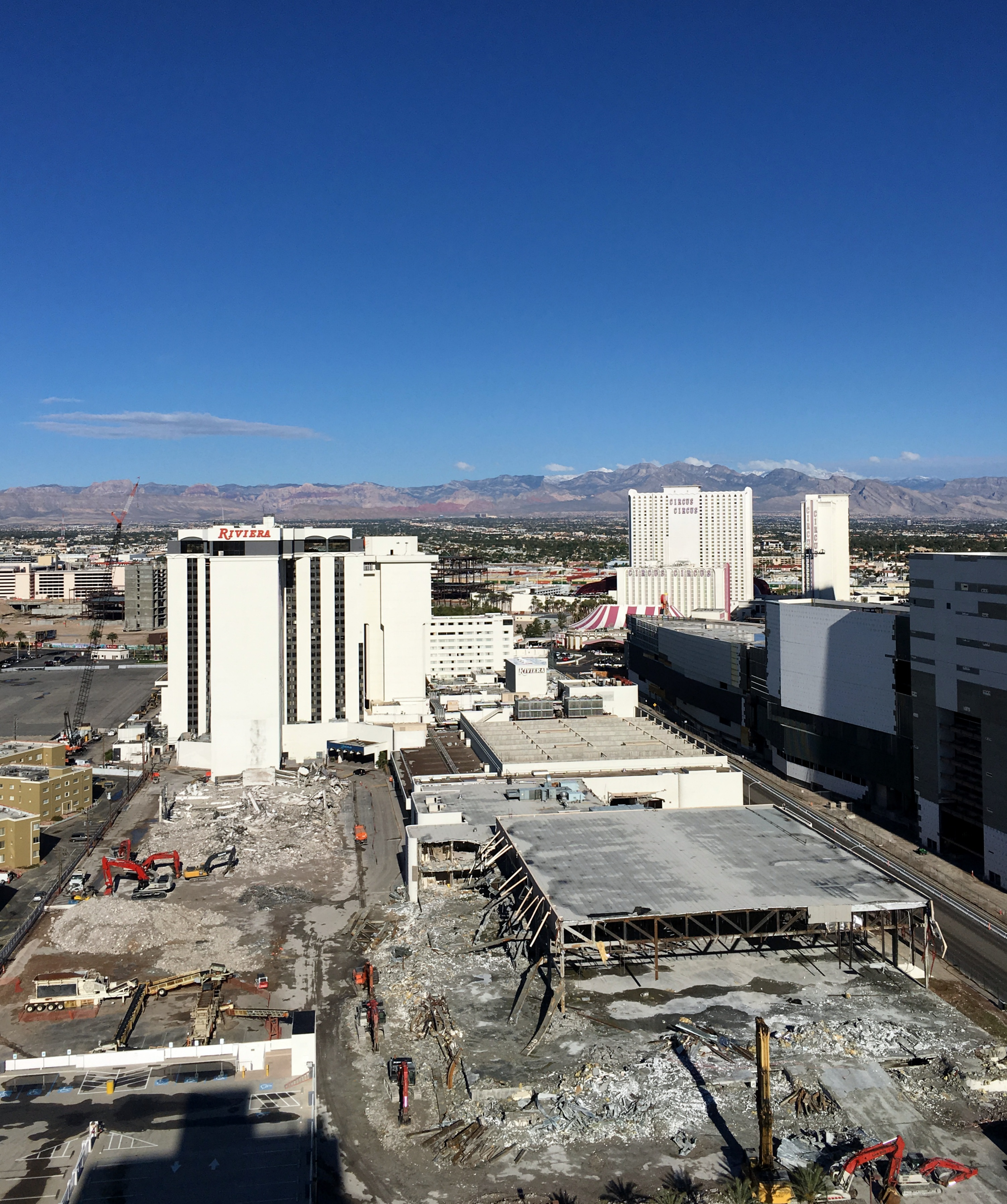
Looking west at the Monaco Tower, May 2016. In the foreground is cleanup of a parking garage (left) and demolition of convention space (right).

The Riviera closed shortly after 12:00 p.m. on May 4, 2015, two weeks following its 60th anniversary. An on-site liquidation sale began later that month, with more than 1 million items available for purchase. Some of the Riviera's slot machines were sold to Stevens, who placed them in his two downtown properties: The D and the Golden Gate.

Petitions to save the Riviera were launched via Change.org and with the county, although these efforts were ultimately unsuccessful. Architecture critic Alan Hess was among those in favor of preservation, suggesting that portions of the resort be incorporated into the redevelopment project. Kristen Peterson of Las Vegas Weekly lamented the Riviera's closure, noting its historic status and design features such as "tiered chandeliers, excessive mirror-paneling and a carpet pattern that could only be the direct kin of '70s television."

John L. Smith of the Las Vegas Review-Journal opined that the Riviera "generated a certain kind of history that ought to be remembered, but I'm not sure its notorious tenure qualifies it for a spot on the National Register of Historic Places." Singer Pia Zadora, who was married to Riklis during his ownership of the Riviera, said of the property: "At the risk of sounding crass, everyone is so upset and distraught about it being torn down, but I think it should have been imploded awhile ago. Either imploded or refurbished. This is not to negate all the memories and all the wonderful stuff that was there, but it just lived too long in a way." Jim Murren, the CEO of MGM Resorts, said that "the days of (the Riviera's) benefit to Las Vegas are long gone," stating that expansion of the convention center "would be very beneficial to the neighborhood."

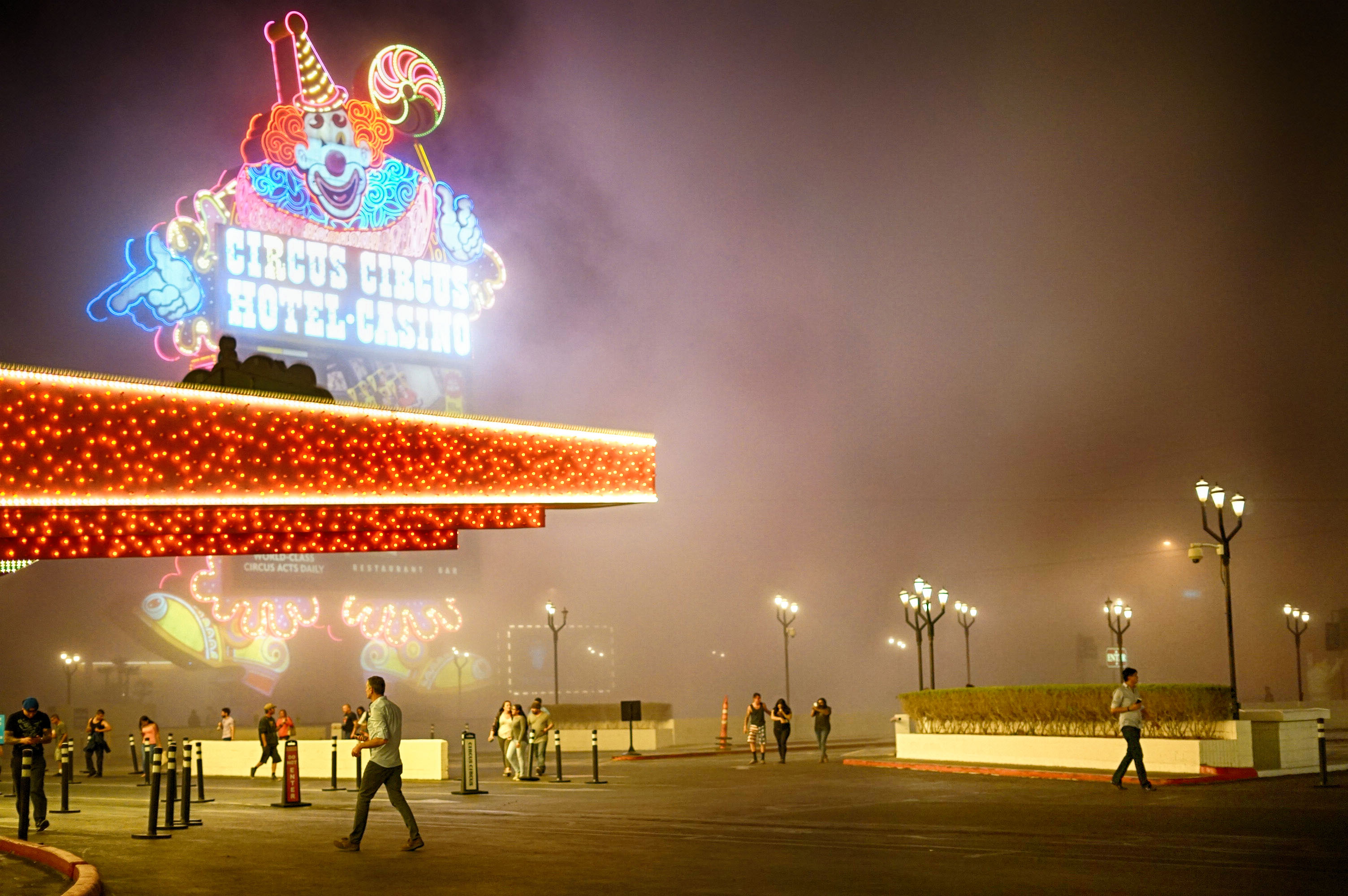
Dust following the first implosion, seen from the Circus Circus property across the street

In response to the petition efforts, the LVCVA noted an economic impact analysis which found that a failure to demolish the Riviera would cost the local economy $15 billion over a 30-year period. The LVCVA had initially hoped to have the Riviera demolished during 2015, although time had to be spent testing for hazardous construction materials such as asbestos. The demolition process began on April 18, 2016, with the removal of hazardous materials. This was followed by demolition of various low-rise structures, which required the use of excavators. Consideration had been given to retaining the Riviera's parking garages, but it was later determined that keeping them would not be beneficial, due to their locations on the site. After demolition started, contaminated soil was discovered on the property's north side, near four underground diesel fuel storage tanks. Nearly 10,000 tons of contaminated soil had to be removed.

By the time of its closure, the Riviera had multiple hotel structures, including several ranging from 12 to 24 stories. Due to the sprawling layout of the Riviera's buildings, a two-phase implosion was scheduled months apart for several of the hotel towers. The implosion work was conducted by Controlled Demolition, Inc., which handled previous implosions in Las Vegas.

The 24-story Monaco Tower was imploded on June 14, 2016, at 2:37 a.m. Implosions have been popular events in Las Vegas since the 1990s, and the Monaco Tower marked the first resort implosion to occur on the Strip since the New Frontier in 2007. Dignitaries and many spectators came to view the implosion, which was preceded by a fireworks show.

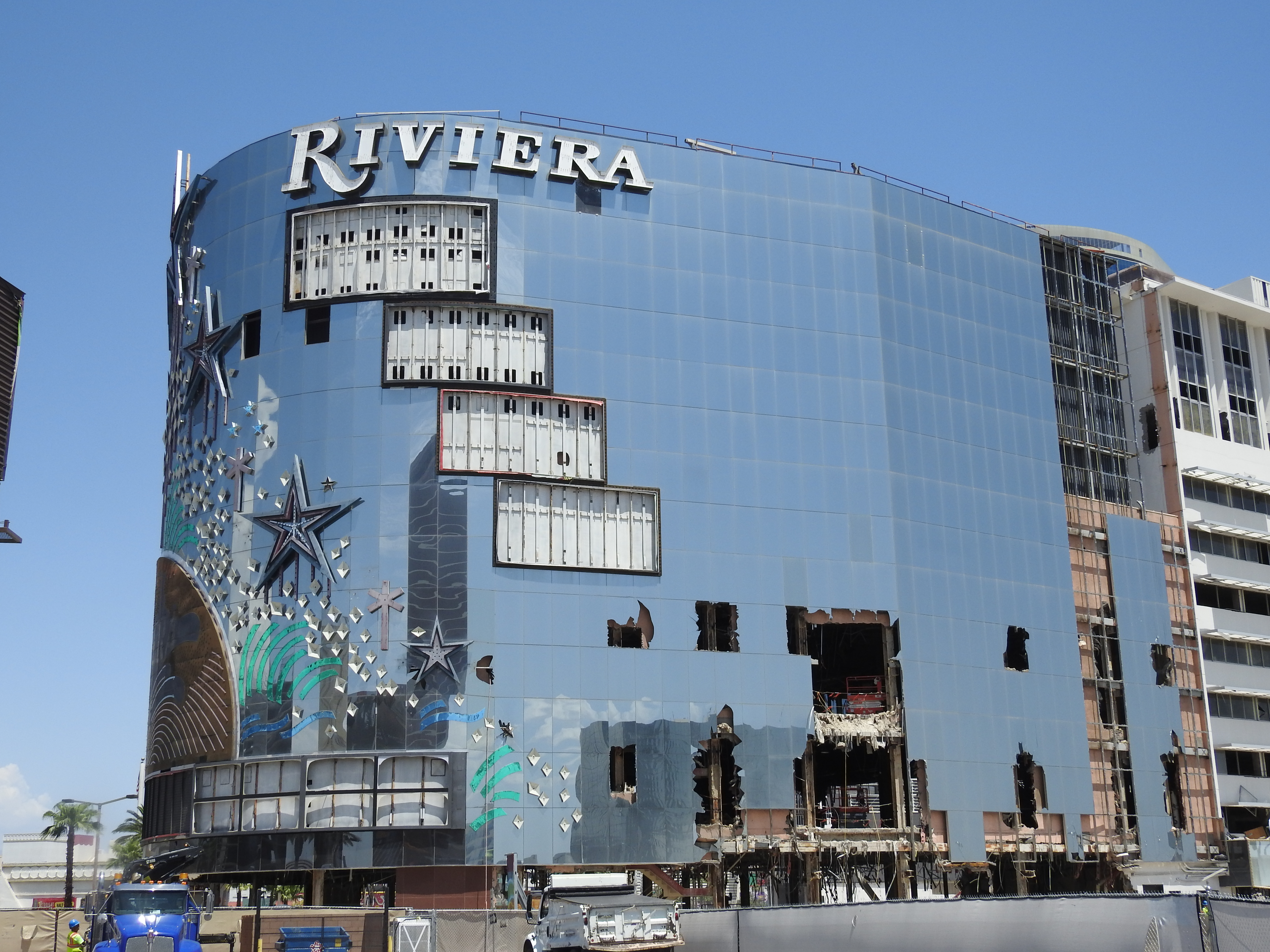
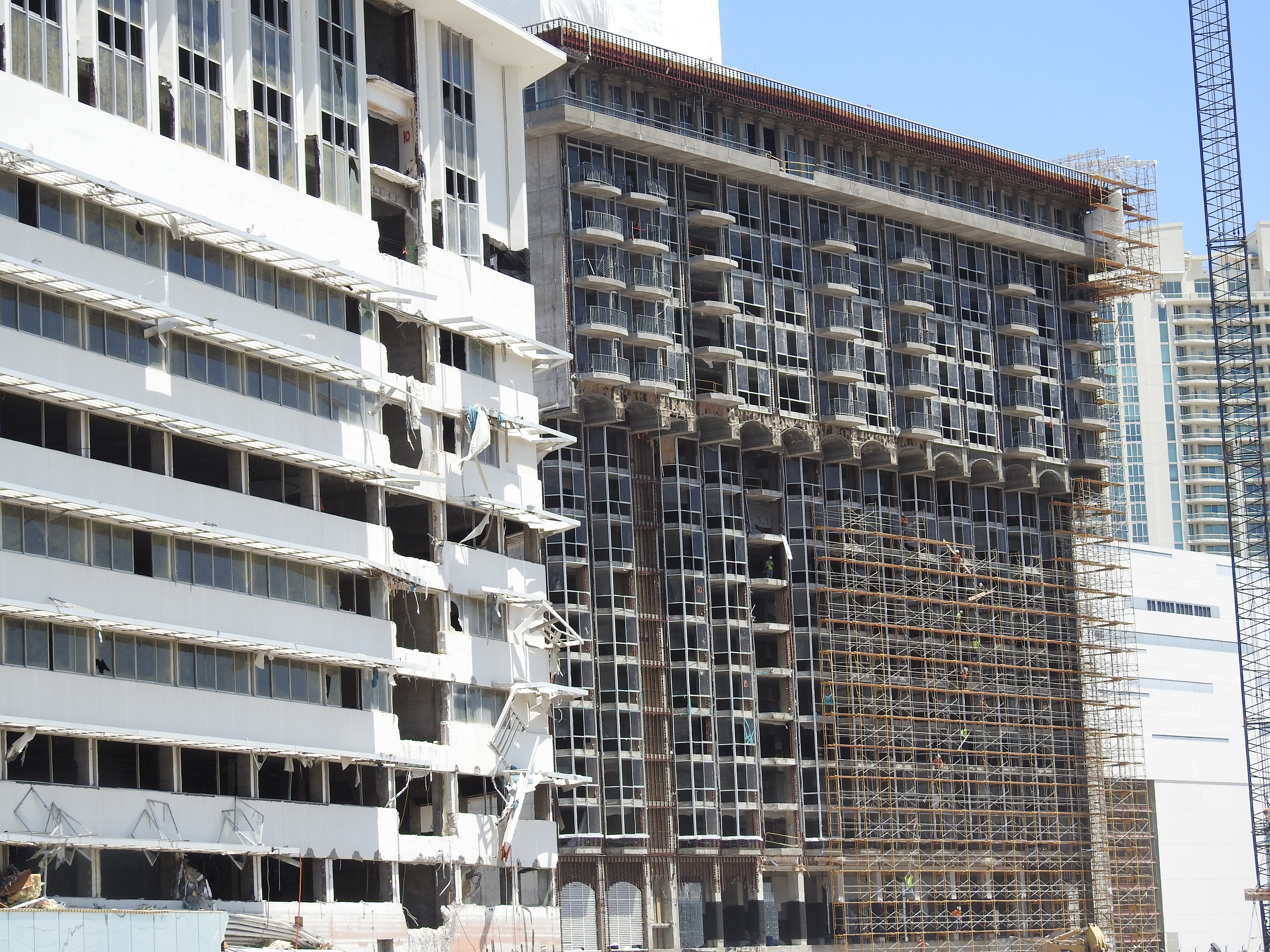
The facade, as well as the 12- and 17-story towers, undergoing preparations for implosion, August 2, 2016

After the implosion, excavators were used to demolish the casino floor and the earliest hotel towers; the 1955 building was the oldest resort structure on the Strip.

The second implosion covered several structures: the 17-story Monte Carlo Tower, the 12-story Mediterranean South tower, and the billboard facade. Asbestos had been discovered in the Monte Carlo Tower, which made its demolition more difficult than that of the Monaco Tower. Before being imploded, the building had to be wrapped in plastic, allowing workers to safely chisel away its stucco exterior without spreading the asbestos. The tower's interior also needed to be cleared of asbestos. This removal process increased demolition costs by $5 million, putting the total at more than $40 million.

The second implosion took place on August 16, 2016, at 2:30 a.m. It was a low-key event, conducted with no fanfare and attracting a few hundred spectators.

=== Redevelopment ===
In its final years, the Riviera occupied 26 acres (11 ha), extending east from Las Vegas Boulevard to Paradise Road. By November 2016, the site had been paved over with a convention center parking lot, which also served as outdoor exhibition space. The convention center expansion, known as the West Hall, began construction in January 2018, occupying the eastern portion of the former Riviera land. Later that year, the LVCVA acquired other nearby acreage which would be used for parking and outdoor exhibits moving forward. As a result, the agency put 10 acres of the Riviera site up for sale in 2019. The land is located along the Strip, at the southeast corner of Elvis Presley Boulevard.

In 2021, an agreement was reached to sell the property to Claudio Fischer, a Chilean real estate developer who had built several casino resorts in South America. Fischer would purchase the site for $120 million, and intended to build a casino resort with a 50-story hotel tower. However, he backed out of the deal in 2023, citing the continual rise of interest rates in the U.S. Later that year, a deal was announced to sell the property to Brett Torino and Paul Kanavos for $125 million. The two had previously developed retail projects along the Strip such as 63, and were also part of the group that sought to buy Riviera Holdings in 2006.

Fontainebleau Las Vegas, which had recently opened just north of the Riviera site, announced in June 2024 that it would purchase 5 of the 10 acres, with Torino and Kanavos retaining the western half that fronts the Strip. Fontainebleau would pay $112.5 million for the east half, to be used for future development. On their portion of the land, Torino and Kanavos have considered a retail and entertainment complex, possibly with a non-gaming hotel. The LVCVA's sale of both parcels closed in November 2024.

== Features ==
The property and several of its facilities, such as the Monaco tower, were named in reference to the French Riviera, but the theme did not extend to the resort's architectural design.

=== Hotel ===
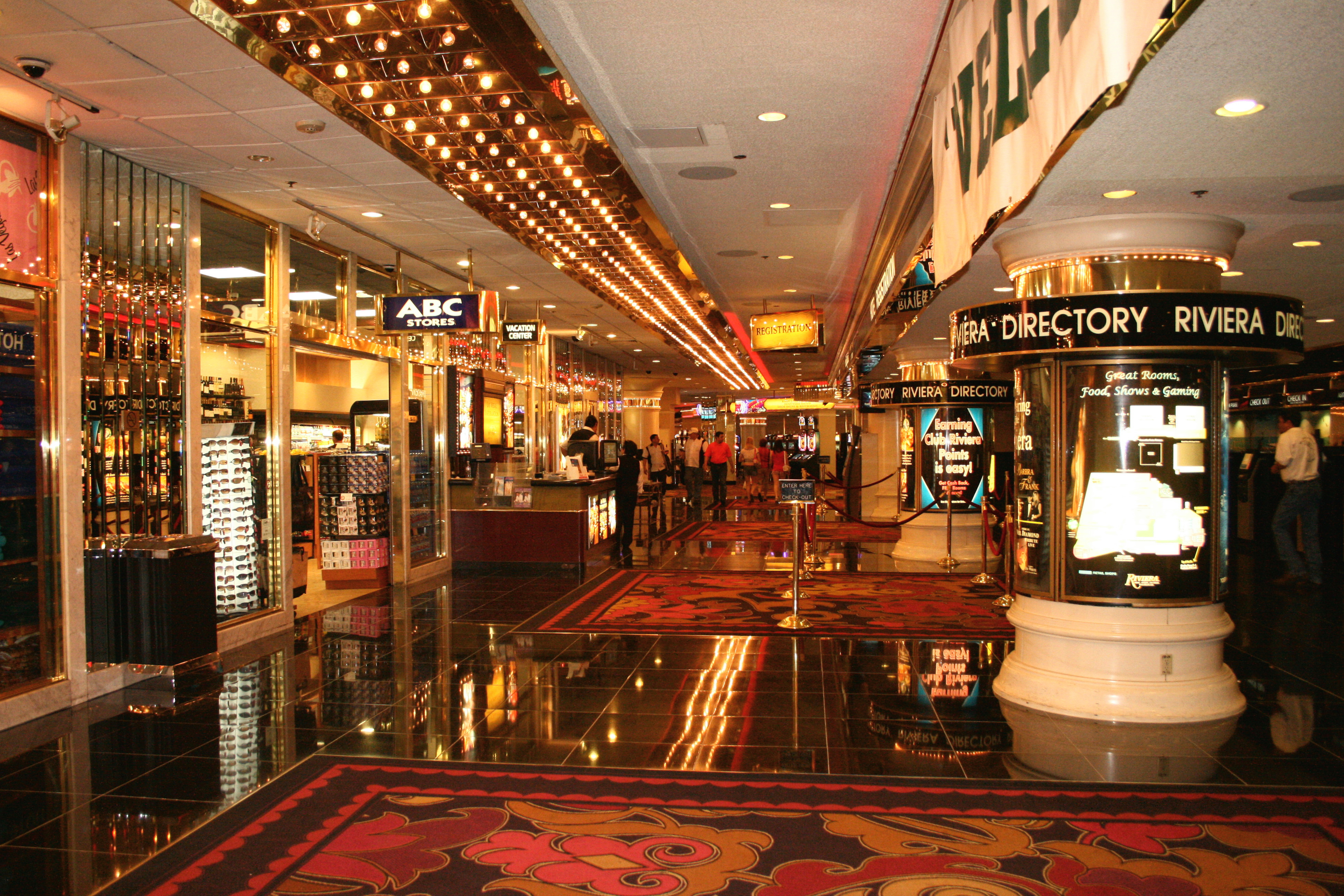
Hotel lobby, 2009

The Riviera originally opened with a nine-story hotel tower, and a connected two-story structure which extended south of it, for a total of 291 rooms. It was the first skyscraper in the Las Vegas Valley, and was the area's tallest building until the opening of the Fremont Hotel and Casino in 1956.

Several hotel expansions would take place in the decades to come. The first expansion was announced in 1959. Designed by Los Angeles architect Welton Beckett, the project included 114 new rooms, added through a six-story addition built atop the two-story structure. It was finished in 1960. These towers were extended further south with a 12-story addition, completed in 1966. The $6 million tower was designed by Harold W. Levitt with Ernest W. Le Duc and William H. Farwell as consulting architects. It added 220 rooms. The original tower and the two newer additions would become known, respectively, as the Mediterranean North and Mediterranean South towers.

The $20 million East Tower, with 300 rooms, was added in 1975. The 17-story project was designed by architect Martin Stern Jr., with interior work by Yates and Silverman of Los Angeles. This addition later became known as the Monte Carlo Tower.

Low-rise additions, known as the Lanai rooms, had been completed in 1962. These were designed by Julius Gabriele, and would later be replaced by two new towers. The six-story San Remo Tower was constructed in 1977, by the Del E. Webb Corporation. The 24-story Monaco Tower opened in 1988, and featured 1,000 rooms. By the time of its closure, the Riviera had 2,075 rooms.

=== Casino ===
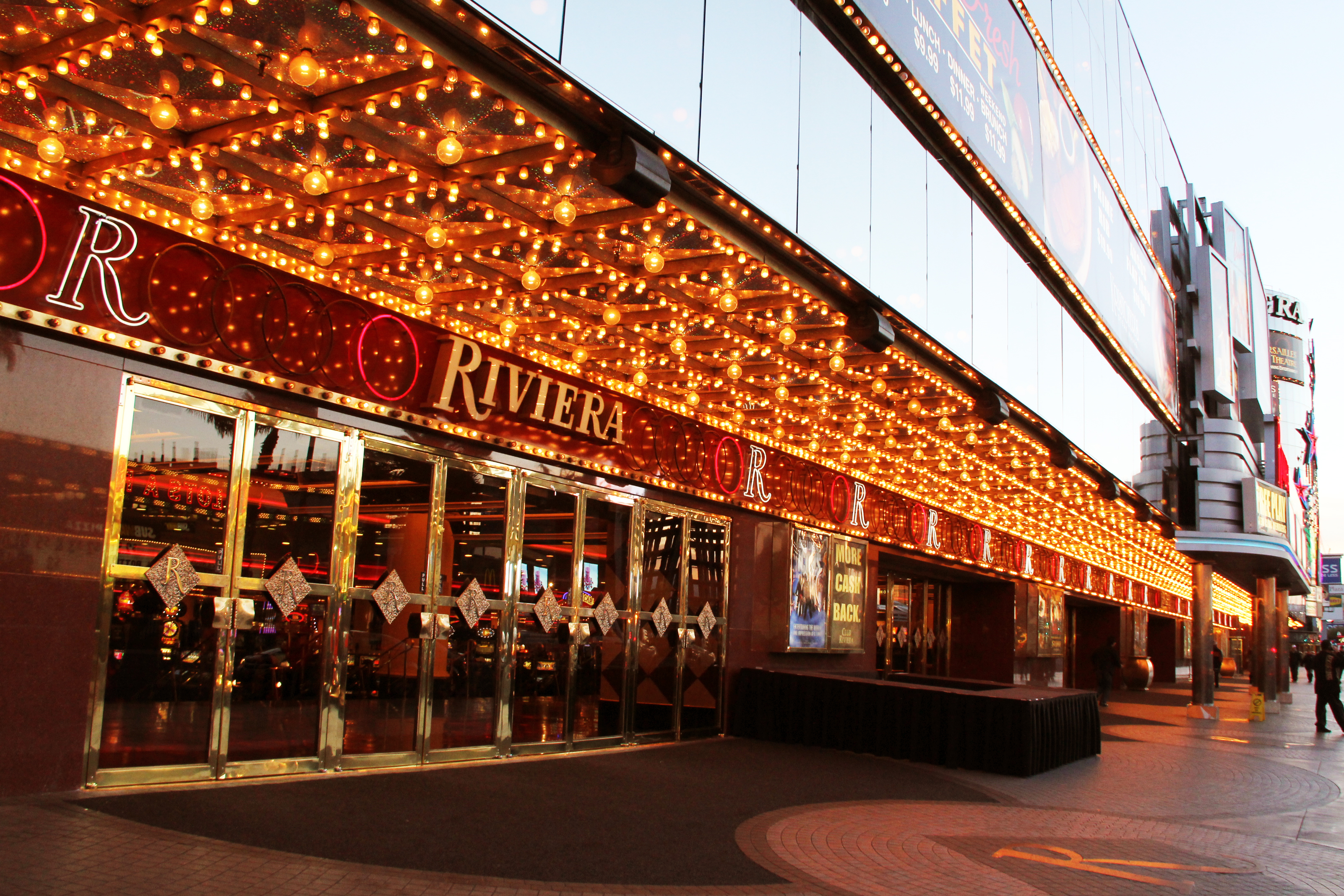
Casino entrance along the Strip, 2012

The Riviera's casino originally opened with 116 slot machines. In 1990, it was expanded to the sidewalk along the Strip with a 70,000 sq ft (6,500 m^{2}) addition, opened on the former parking lot. The property's gaming space was increased to approximately 125,000 sq ft (11,600 m^{2}), reputedly making it the largest casino in the world, although this figure was disputed by the new Trump Taj Mahal in Atlantic City, which claimed to be the largest with 120,000 sq ft (11,000 m^{2}).

In continued efforts to attract a budget-conscious demographic, a casino addition known as Nickel Town was added to the Riviera in 1997. The 10,000 sq ft (930 m^{2}) area had more than 300 slots, most of them nickel machines.

The sportsbook was remodeled in 2011, and included the addition of a walk-up betting window along the Strip. The casino also added bingo to set it apart from other resorts on the Strip, an area where the game had been absent since 2007. New slot machines were also added, and the poker room was updated as well. In its final years, the total gaming space measured 103,800 sq ft (9,640 m^{2}), including the 12,000 sq ft (1,100 m^{2}) sportsbook. The casino had nearly 1,000 slot machines during that time.

=== Restaurants ===
The Riviera featured various dining options, including the Ristorante Italiano, added in 1977. Another restaurant, Kady's Coffee Shop, was named after Riklis' daughter and opened in 1986. While Silver was chief executive in 1984, he added a Burger King franchise inside the Riviera, making it the first Strip resort to feature a fast food chain outlet; this move inspired the phrase "Burger King Revolution" to refer to the broader trend of Las Vegas casinos catering to middle-class customers. Other fast-food options were added in a food court addition, opened in 1990. The resort also had a low-priced buffet, which closed after many years in 2013, unable to compete with its upscale competitors. It was the cheapest buffet on the Strip at the time of its closure, charging less than $15 a person.

=== Neon signage ===
Upon opening, the Riviera featured a simple roadside sign along the Strip, replaced by a larger sign two years later. In 1966, a taller sign was added along the Strip. By 1990, it had been moved to the rear of the property along Paradise Road, making way for the casino expansion.

The circular billboard was added in 1989, and was accompanied by a block-long facade. Both of these faced the Strip, and consisted of mirrored panels and neon signage for various property features, such as restaurants and entertainment. The facade work was designed by Nikita Zukov, along with Marge Williams of Federal Sign.

A steel sculpture was added to the Riviera's northwest corner in the late 1990s, as part of the Nickel Town addition. The sculpture featured three steel poles pointed outward, resembling fountain water. The poles were covered in neon lighting and had an advertising screen wrapped around them.

The sign along Paradise Road was removed in 2016, following the Riviera's closure. Neon letters from the billboard facade, spelling out "Riviera", were acquired by Will Durham, a Reno collector of neon signs. Other signage from the facade, as well as another "Riviera" sign from the property's east entrance, were donated to the city's Neon Museum.

Gallery of various signs
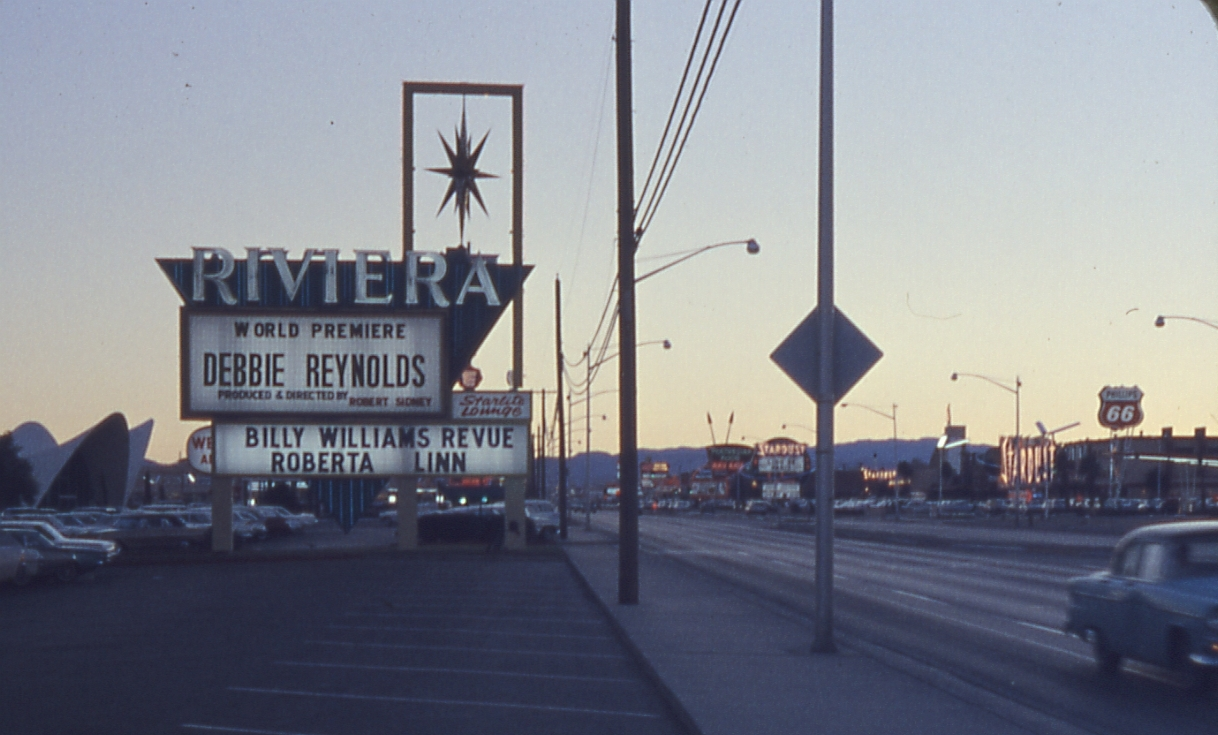
The 1957 sign, seen here five years after installation

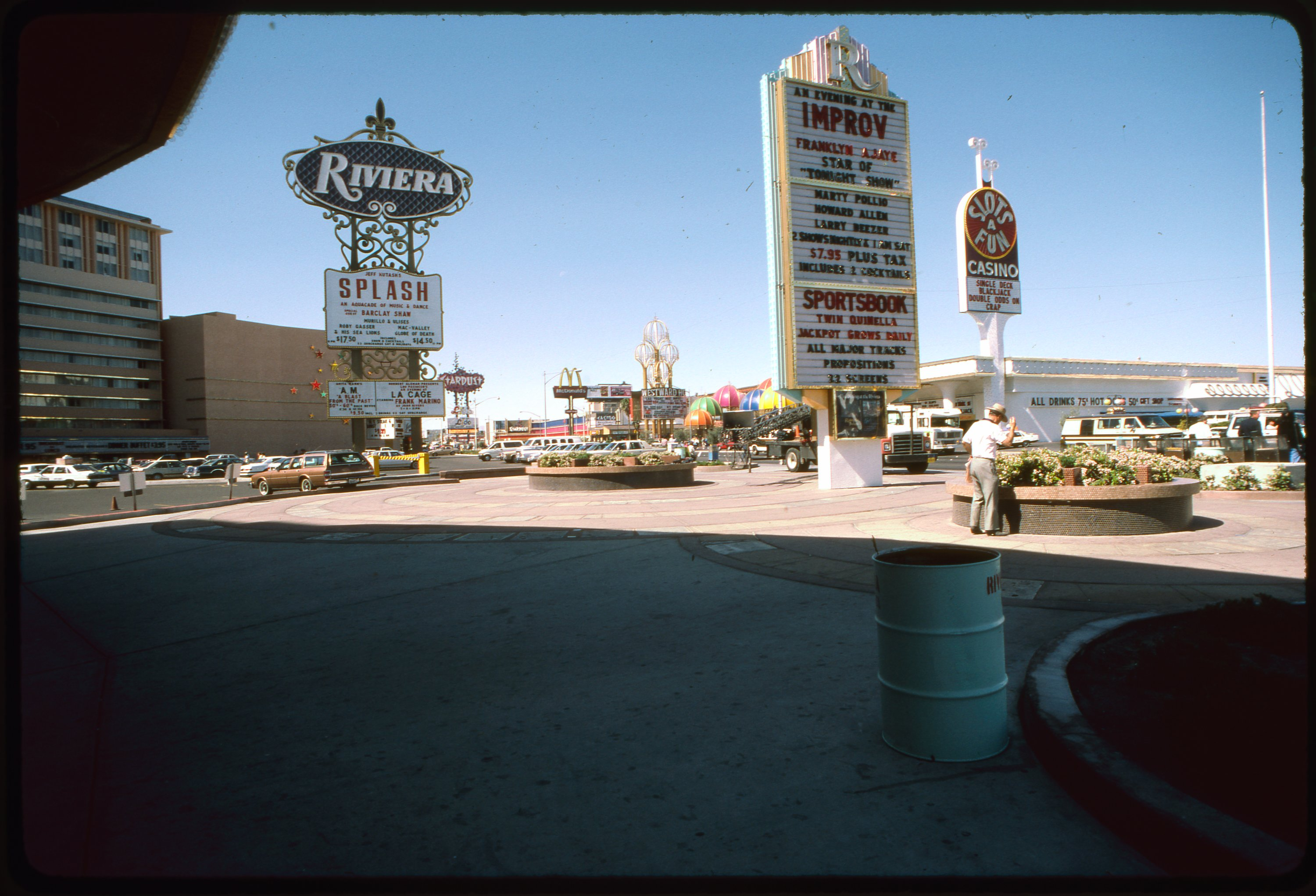
The 1966 sign (left), seen two decades later

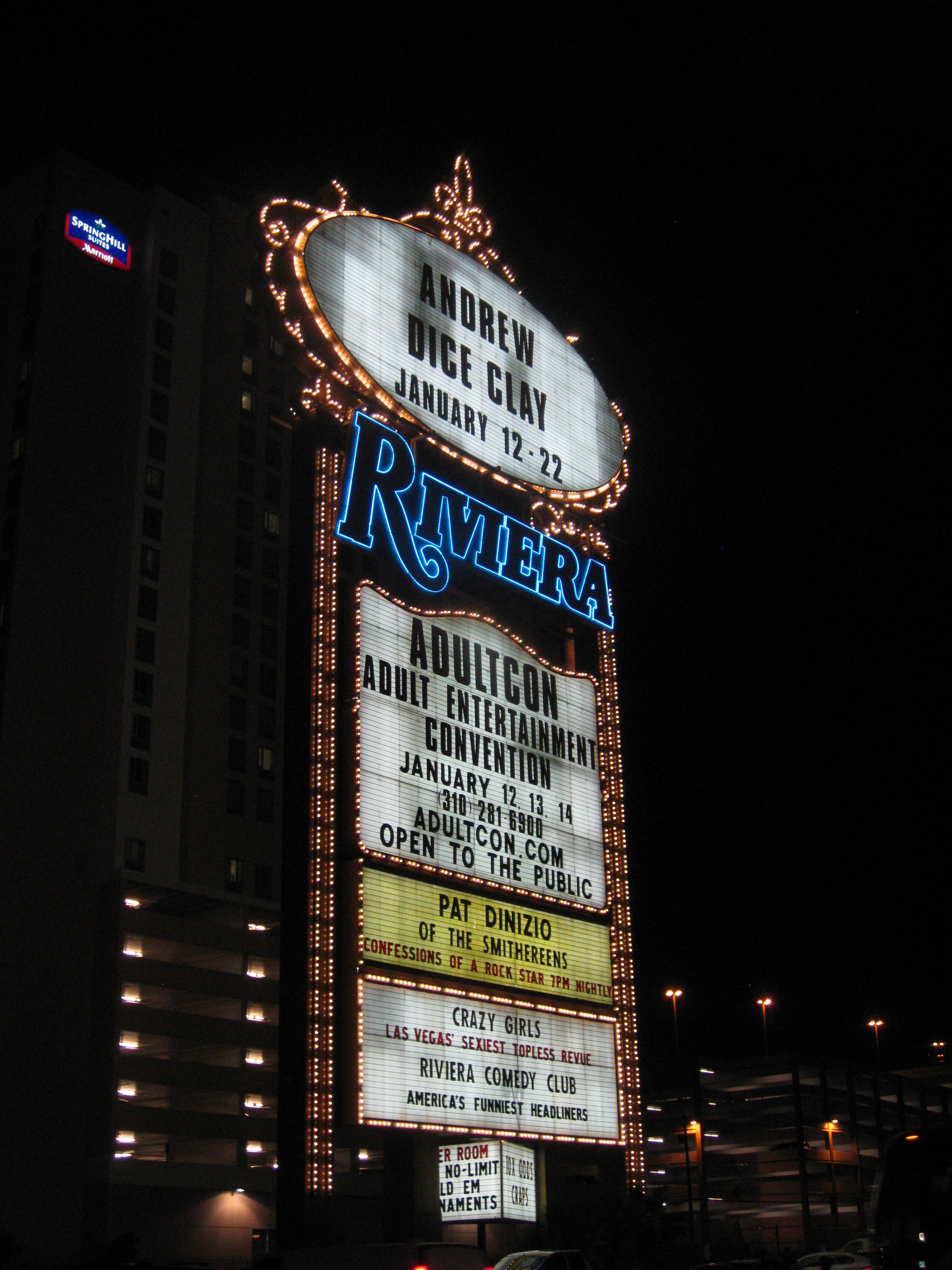
The same sign in 2012, after being relocated to Paradise Road

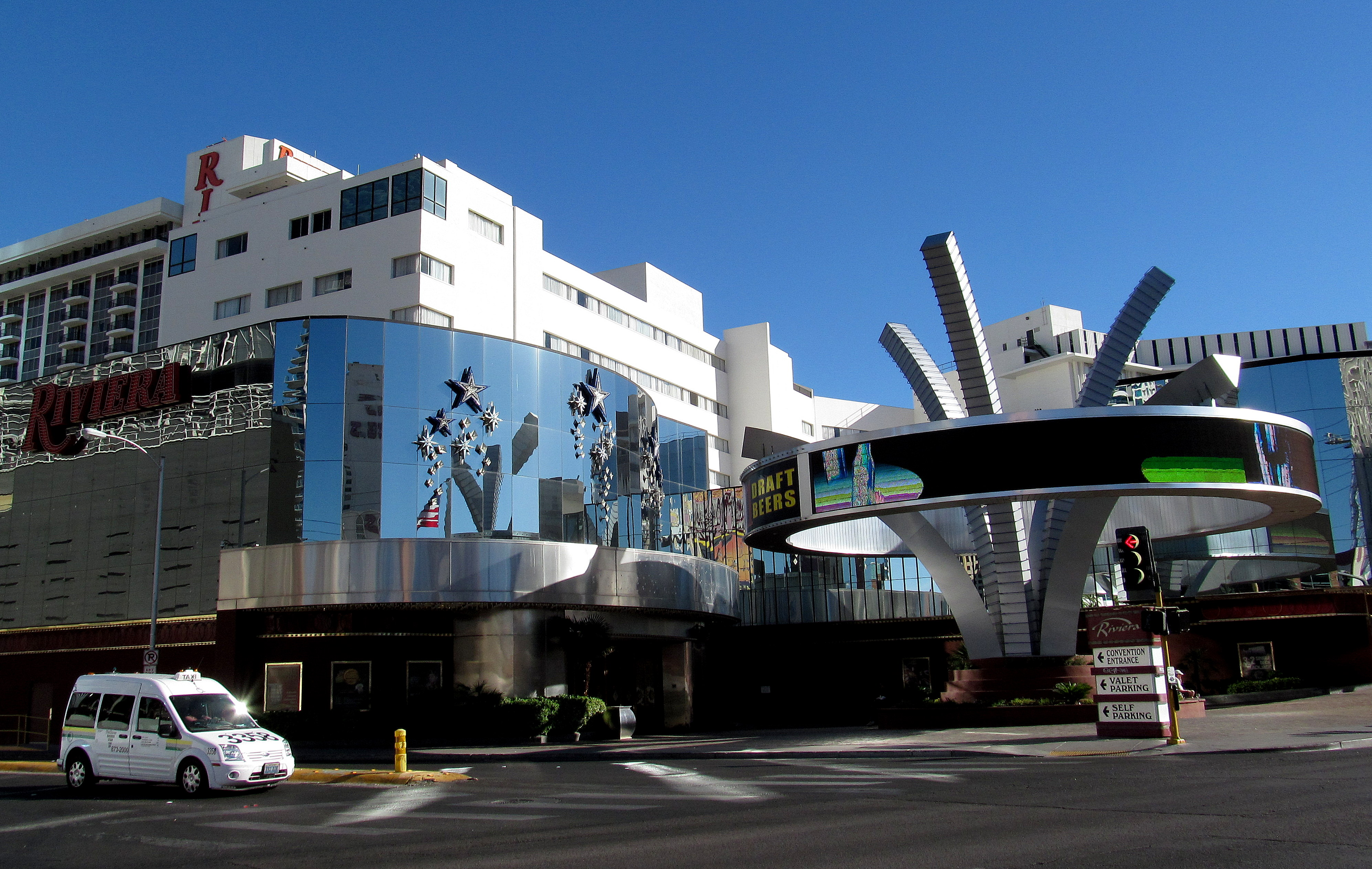
The 1990s sign, part of the Nickel Town addition

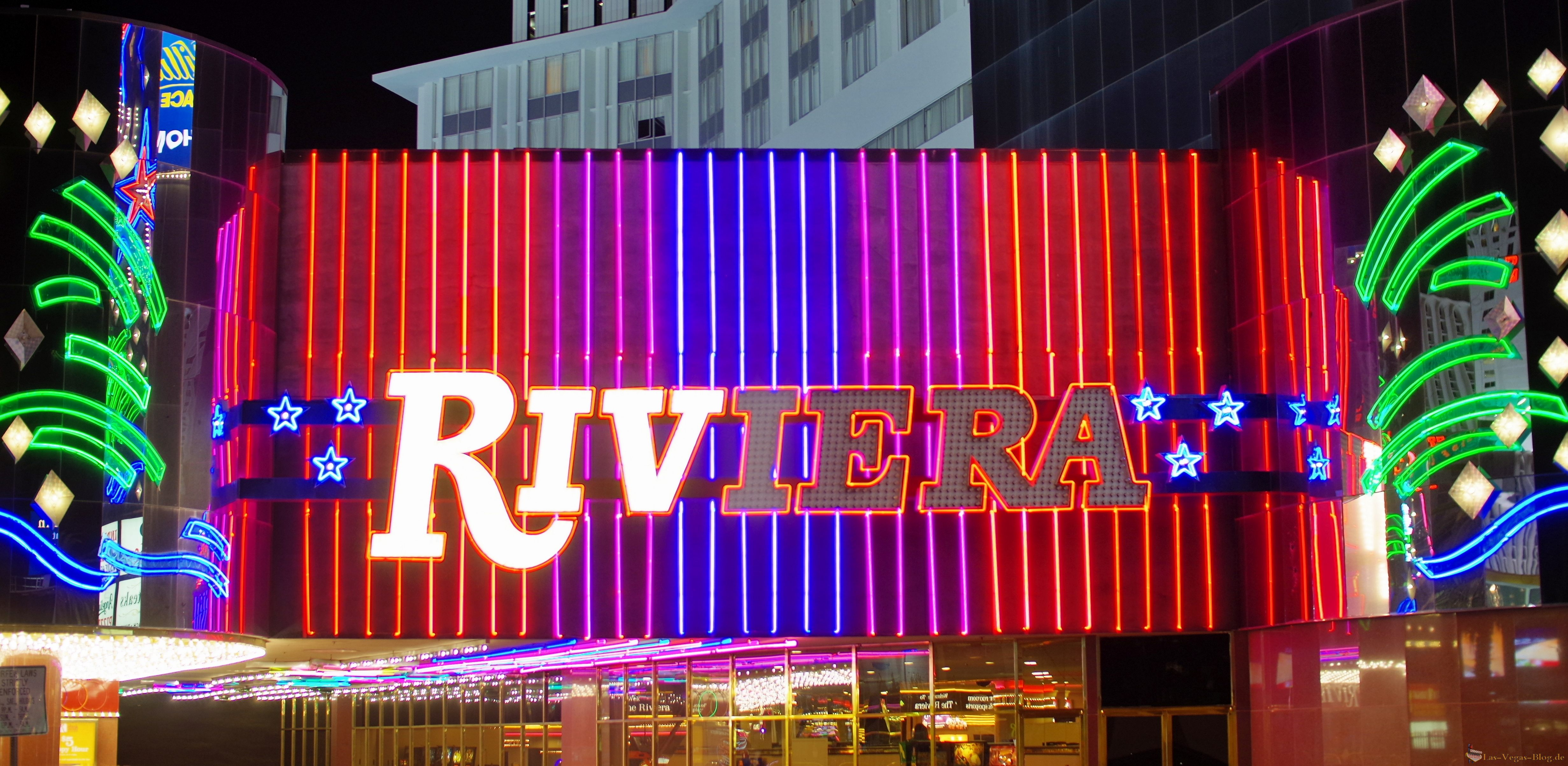
Signage along the Strip, 2013

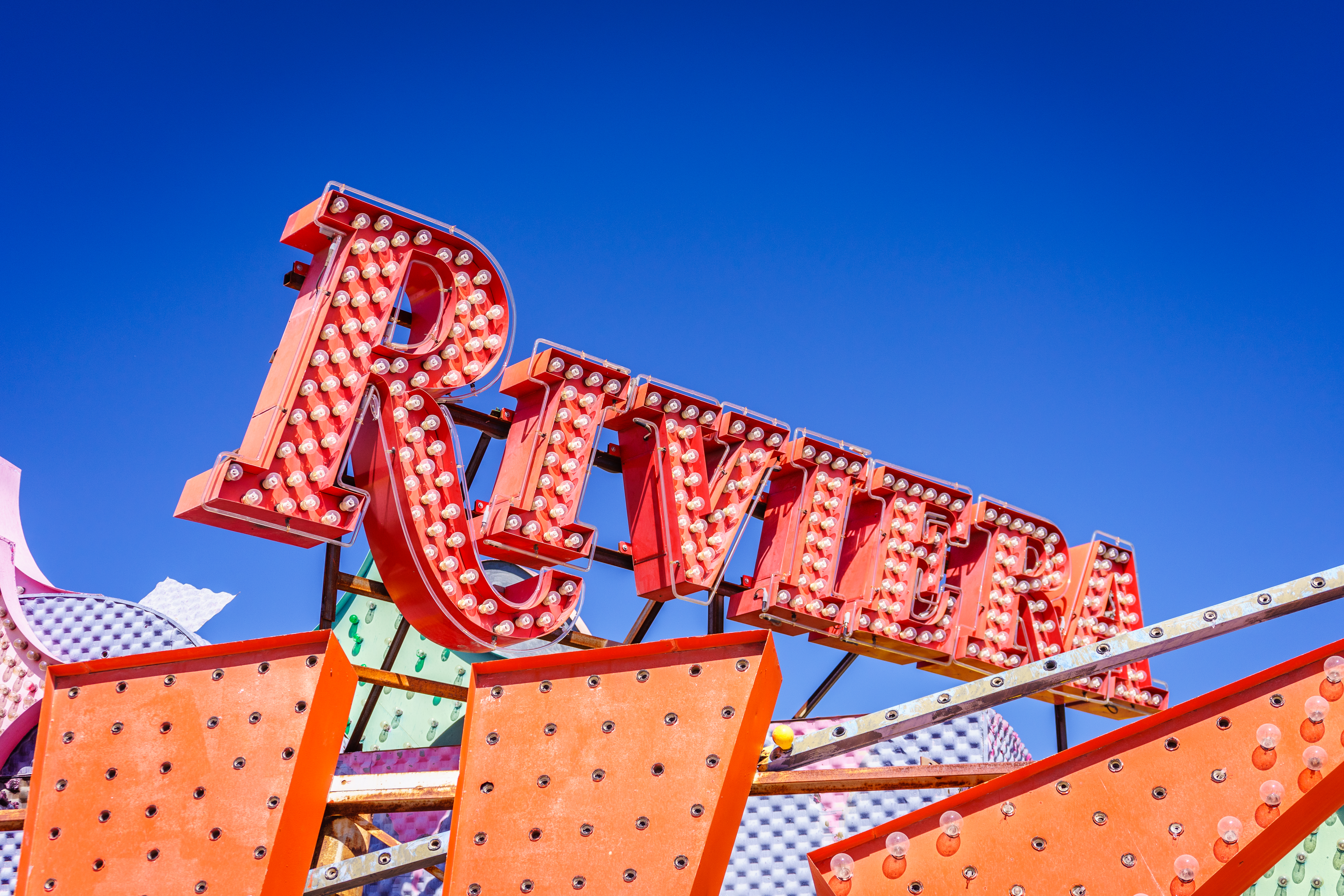
A Riviera sign at the Neon Museum
Gallery of the billboard facade
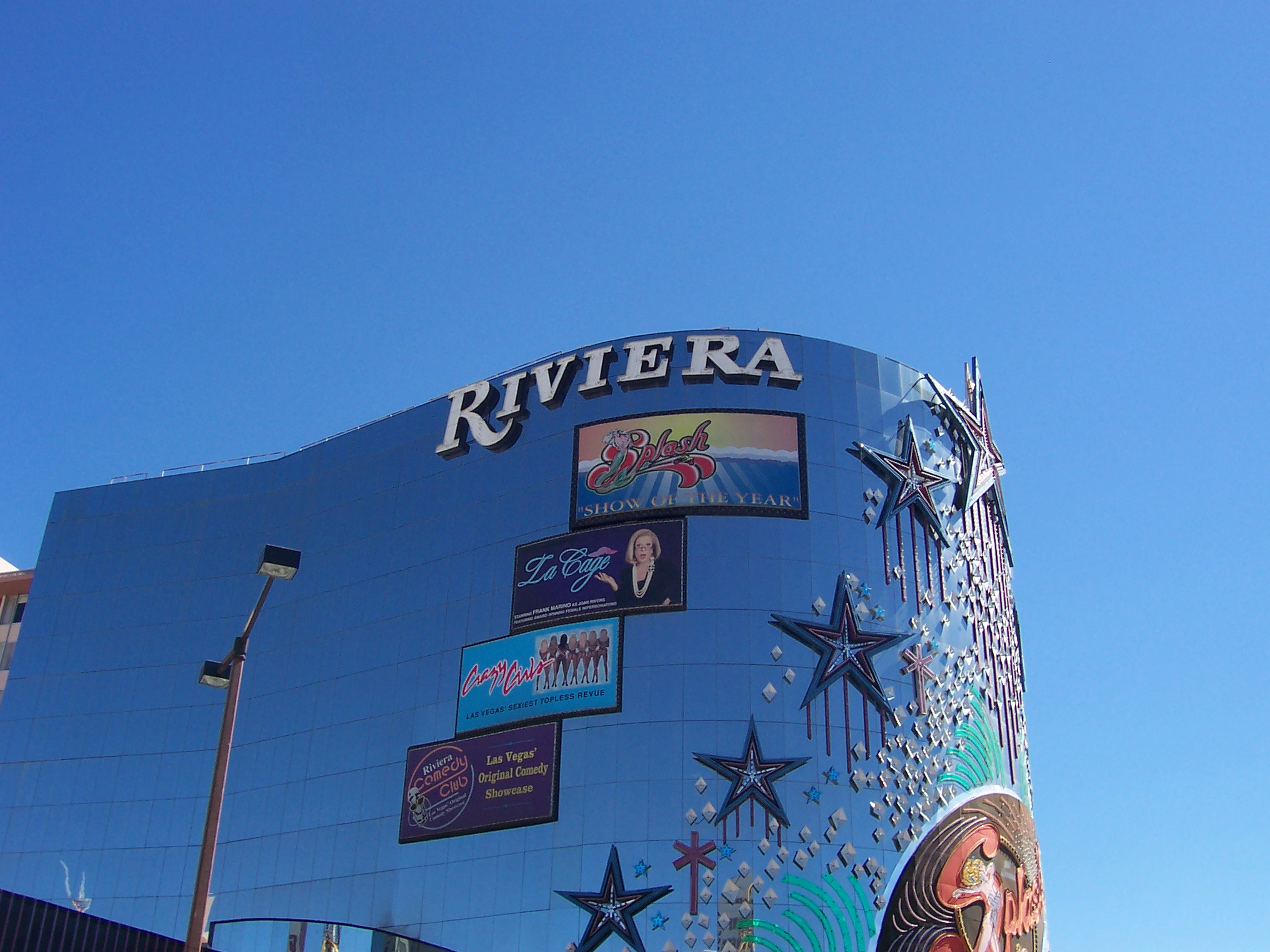
The north side of the facade

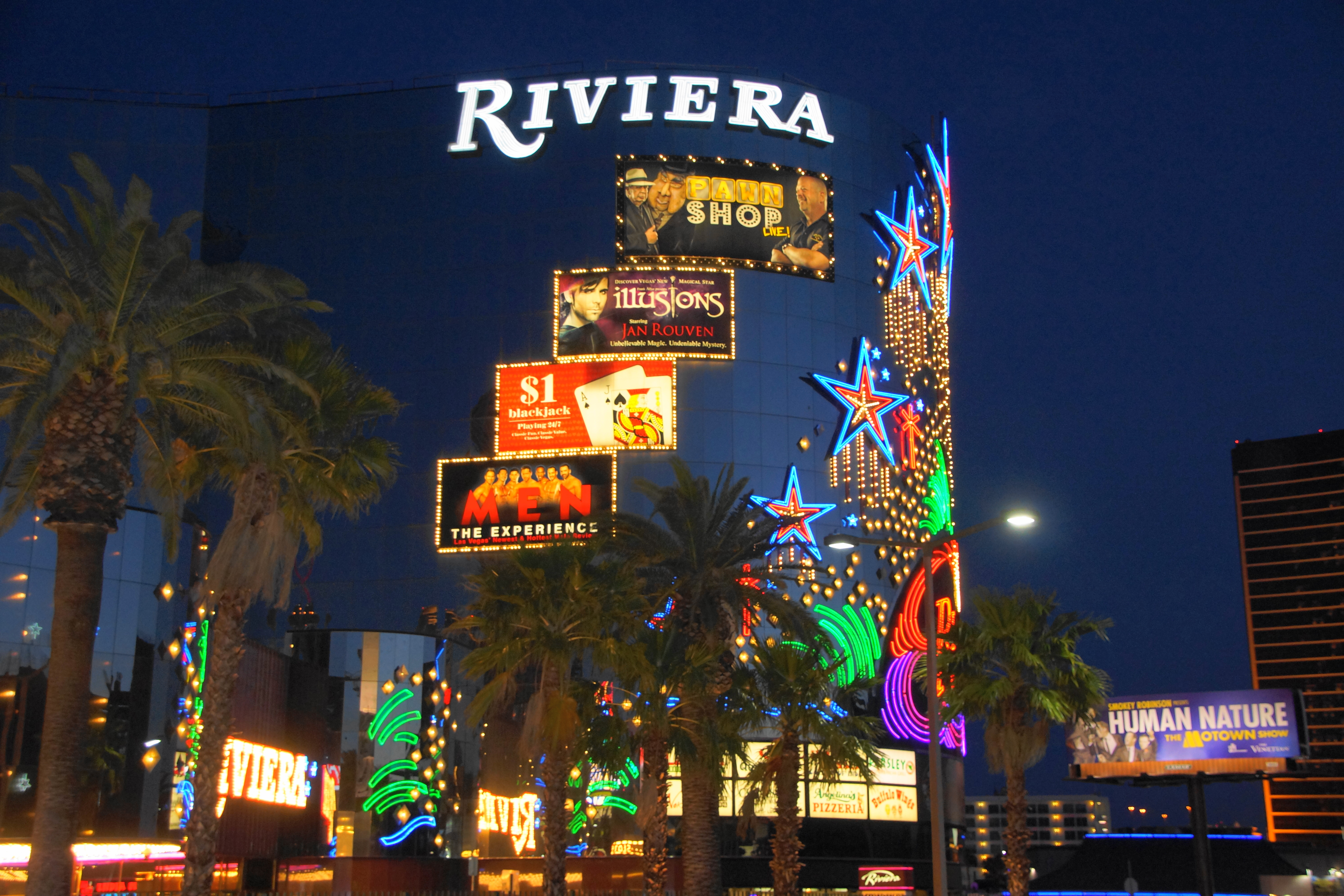
Same angle at night

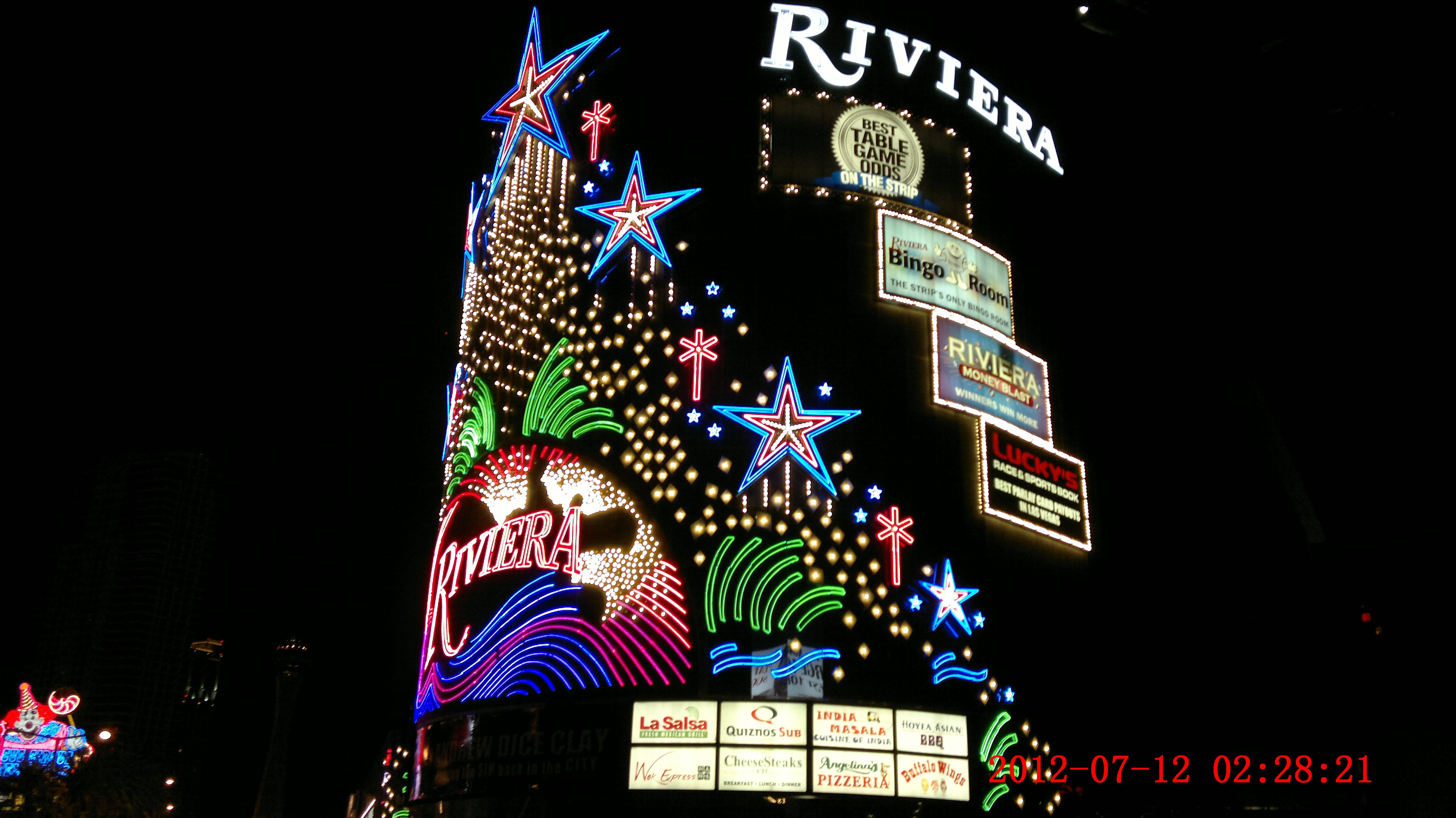
The facade's south side

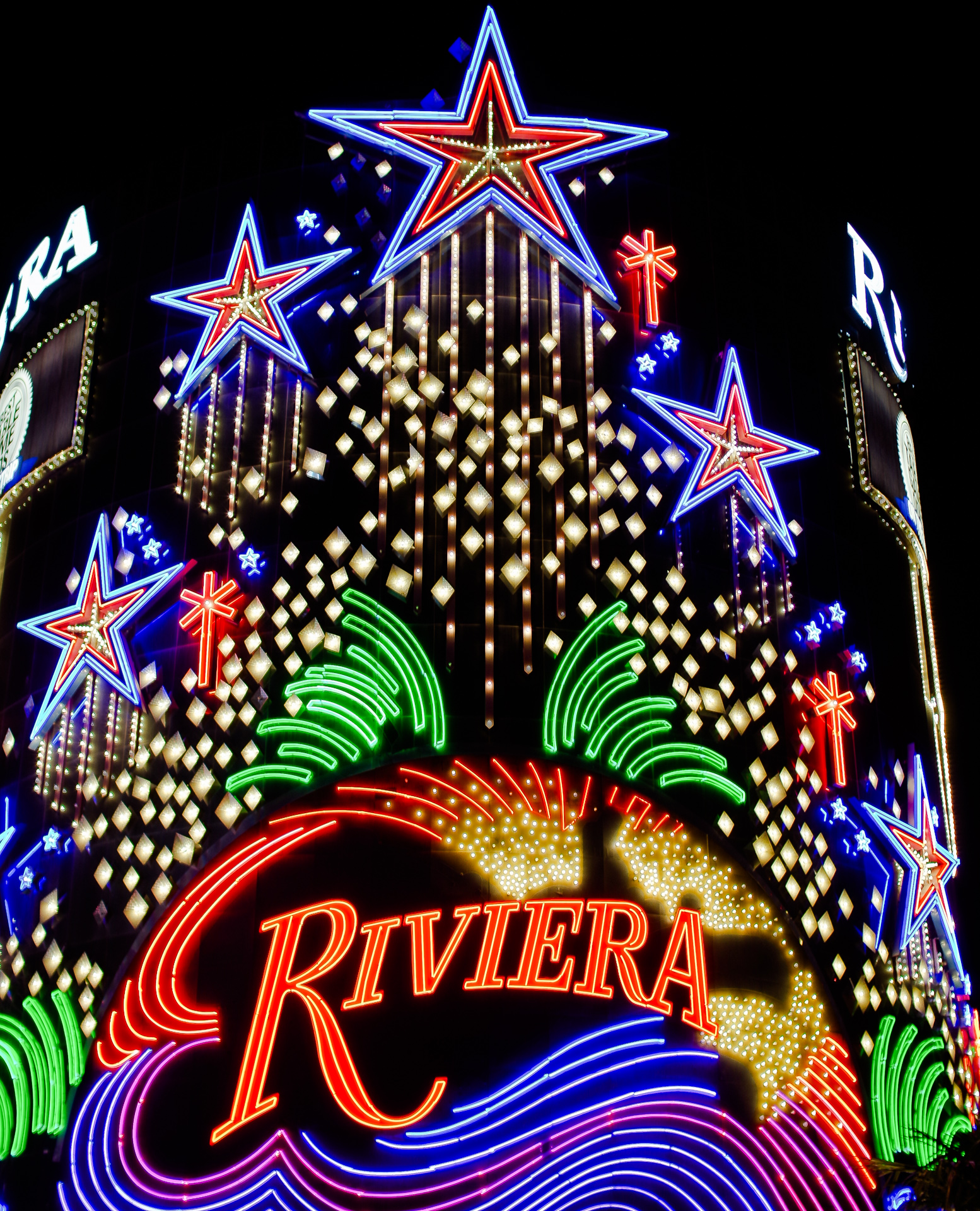
Close-up shot

=== Other features ===
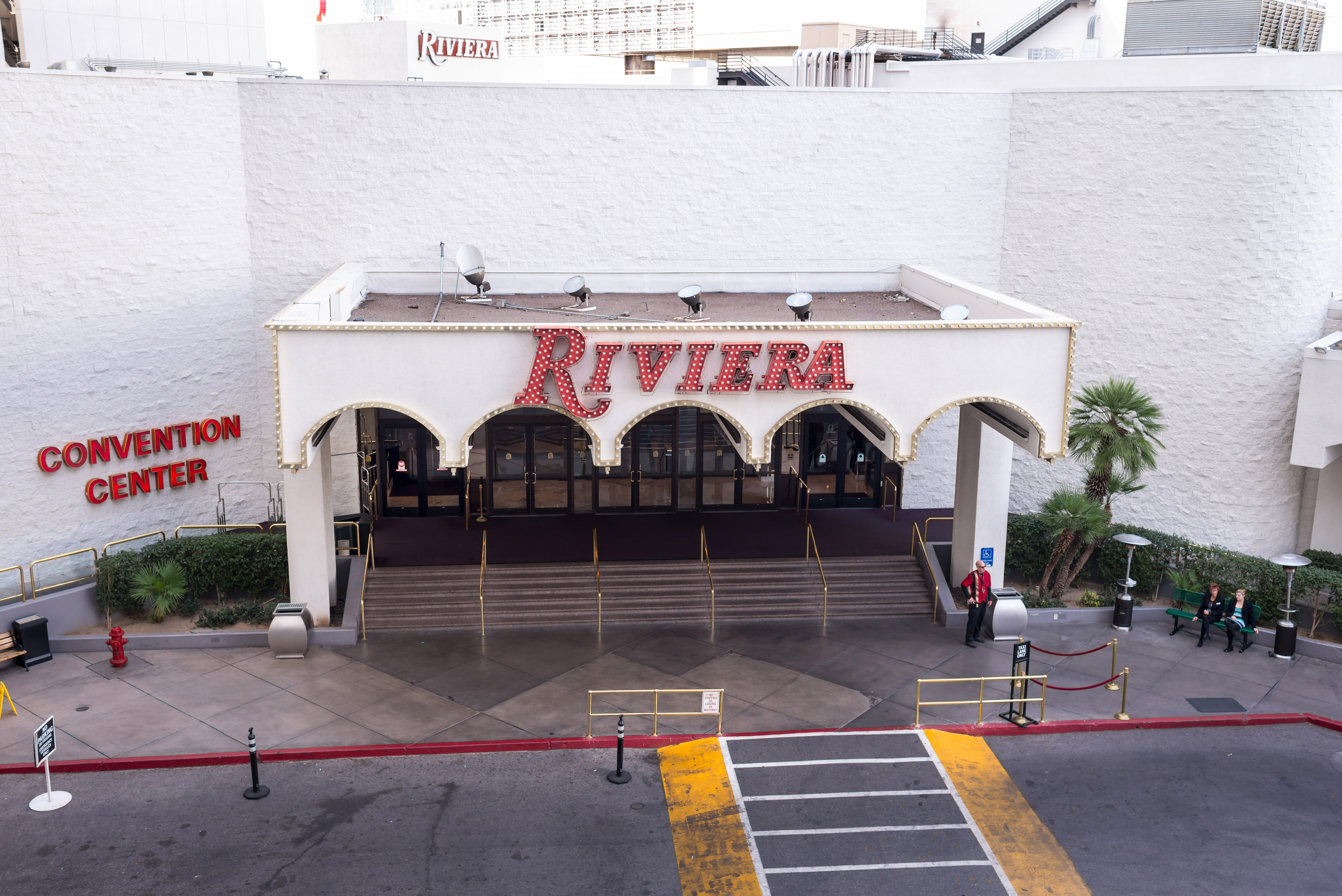
East entrance to the casino and convention center, 2015

A convention center was added in 1968, and a major expansion began 30 years later. This helped the Riviera stay competitive in the 2000s, with the property hosting numerous groups and events each year.

In 1984, the Riviera set up a walk of fame on its sidewalk along the Strip. It consisted of concrete slabs featuring handprints from celebrities, including boxer Sugar Ray Leonard, and singers Dolly Parton and Michael Jackson. The walk of fame was short-lived and eventually removed. Jackson's slab and others were stored in the Riviera basement for the next two decades, before being raffled off to gamblers. In 2012, Jackson's slab was placed at Grauman's Chinese Theatre in Hollywood.

Tennis courts were added near the pool area in 1972. A second pool had been added to the rooftop of the 1990 casino expansion, but it was soon drained and left abandoned after it began leaking onto the gaming floor.

== Live entertainment ==
Liberace provided the Riviera's opening-night entertainment, while actress Joan Crawford mingled with guests. Liberace was paid $50,000 a week to perform at the Riviera, a record salary for Las Vegas entertainers at the time. The resort included a dinner theatre known as the Clover Room, seating 550 people. It was renamed the Versailles Theatre in 1960. The property also included the Starlight Lounge.

Several entertainers made their Las Vegas debut at the Riviera, including Orson Welles in 1956, Barbra Streisand (as opening act for Liberace) in 1963, and Engelbert Humperdinck in 1969. Other notable entertainers throughout the Riviera's history included Ed Sullivan, Red Skelton, Tony Bennett, Patti Page, Louis Armstrong, Eddie Fisher, Debbie Reynolds, Tony Orlando, Bobby Vinton, Charo, Harry Belafonte, Liza Minnelli, Ricci Martin, and Shecky Greene.

Mitzi Gaynor signed a contract with the Riviera in 1966 and performed her stage show in 4-week residencies twice annually from 1966 through 1972.

In 1967, singer Ann-Margret signed an entertainment contract with the Riviera, and also married Roger Smith there. Five years later, actress Olivia Hussey and Dean Paul Martin (son of Dean Martin) would also hold their wedding at the resort.

Sam Distefano was the resort's head of entertainment during the 1980s, and eventually teamed up comedians Bob Hope and George Burns for their first performance together. He also booked Liza Minnelli, Luciano Pavarotti, and Frank Sinatra (whom Distefano signed for a 2-year exclusive deal). Distefano's son, Michael Distefano, brought Douglas Mac-Valley's Brazilian Globe of Death Motorcycle Spectacular specialty act from the Playboy Hotel and Casino in Atlantic City, to be featured in the resort's $10M award-winning, 22-year-running "Splash" production show extravaganza (created and produced by Jeff Kutash and associate-produced by the senior Distefano), that sold out nightly and generated over $1B in ticket sale revenue as one of the city's most successful and longest running shows in its history. Both Distefanos permanently resided in their own high-roller penthouses atop the north and south Mediterranean towers of the iconic resort for 12 years. It was in 1988 that Distefano and the hotel's C.E.O. Arthur Waltzman, brought in Steve Schirripa (who was a bouncer at the 'Shark Club,' one of the city's popular nightclubs) to manage the hotel's comedy club (Bud Friedman's 'An Evening At The Improv'). After Distefano retired, he appointed the soon-to-be-Soprano's-star, his successor as head of the property's entertainment department. Future actor Steve Schirripa worked as entertainment director during the 1990s.

Singer Frank Sinatra performed at the Riviera several times in the early 1990s. After his performances, he would stay in a high roller suite in the Monte Carlo Tower, which was redesigned to his liking. Following his death in 1998, the hotel dedicated the room in his honor, renaming it the Frank Sinatra Suite.

=== Primary shows ===
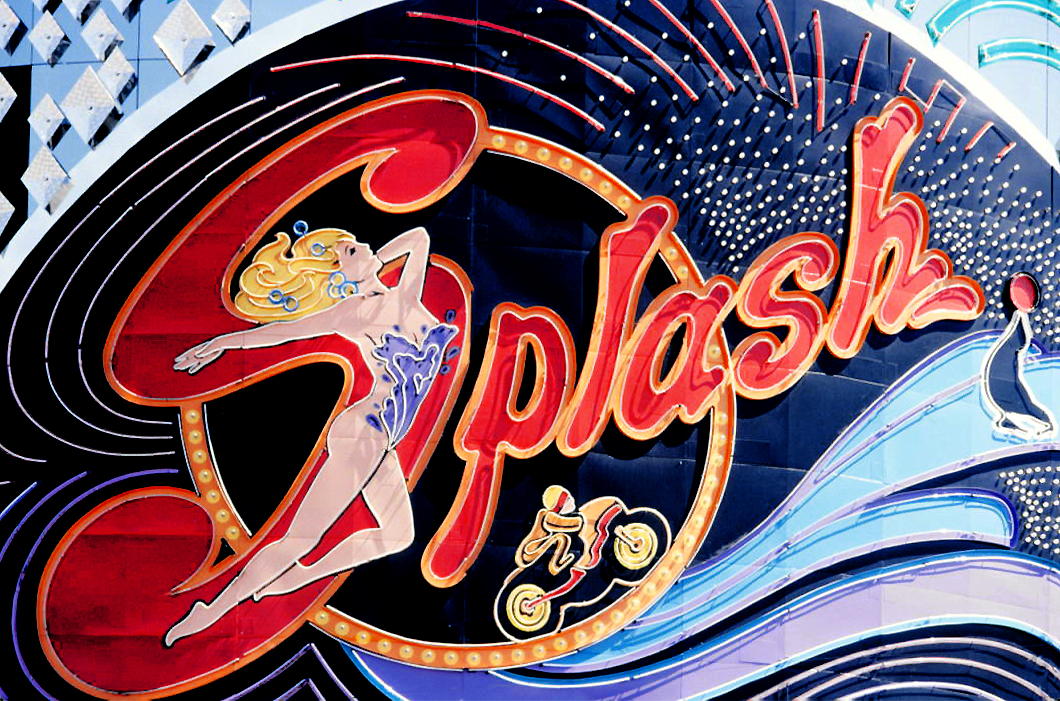
Splash neon signage, part of the Riviera's billboard facade, 1989

The Riviera debuted several long-running shows in the 1980s, while under the ownership of Riklis. Among them was Splash, which debuted in June 1985. It was directed, produced and choreographed by Jeff Kutash with lighting design by Ken Billington. The show included dancers, motorcycle stunts, and a 20,000-gallon tank for swimming performances. For the sake of variety, the show's entertainment lineup was subject to frequent changes.

Splash underwent a $5 million revamp in 1995, and was rebranded as Splash II, a name it would retain for several years. Kutash departed the production in 1996, and Riklis would later become its owner and producer. The tank was removed in 1999, replaced with a surface for ice-skating performances. Kutash returned in 2005 and revamped the show once more, in honor of its 20th anniversary. Splash ended its run in September 2006.

Another show, titled An Evening at La Cage, debuted in September 1985. It featured a cast of female impersonators who portrayed various celebrities, such as Cher and Diana Ross. Frank Marino starred as the show's headliner with his impersonation of Joan Rivers. The show was produced by Norbert Aleman, and ran until February 2009.

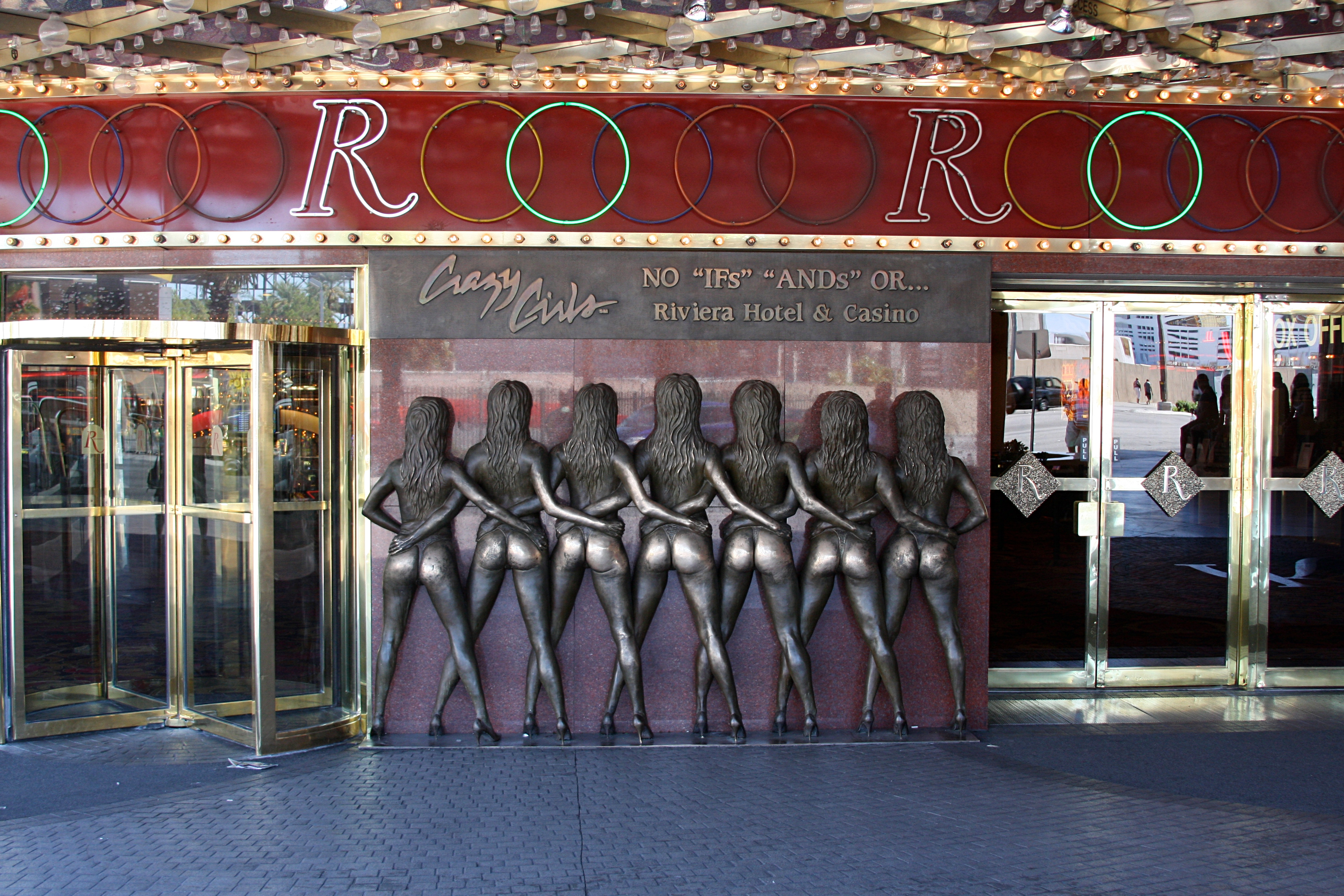
Crazy Girls sculpture, 2010

Aleman also produced another Riviera show, a topless revue known as Crazy Girls, which debuted in September 1987. One of its early performers was transgender showgirl Jahna Steele. A prominent advertising photo of the dancers was shot in 1994. It featured the dancers dressed in G-strings and lined up with their backs to the camera, bearing their buttocks. The photo was used on billboards and taxicabs, despite objections from some elected officials who found the image too risqué.

In 1997, a bronze sculpture of the dancers was unveiled at the Riviera's entrance along the Strip, commemorating the show's 10th anniversary. It was created by sculptor Michael Conine over the course of nearly a year. The National Organization for Women objected to the sculpture, deeming it sexually explicit. In response, Conine said, "Nudity has been in art since the beginning. Using the female nude in art is nothing new." The sculpture became a popular tourist attraction, with visitors often rubbing the buttocks for good luck, wearing them down to a shine. Crazy Girls closed along with the Riviera in May 2015. The show and its sculpture were relocated to the Planet Hollywood resort on the Strip, where they remained until 2021.

=== New venues and final years ===
Budd Friedman opened a comedy club at the Riviera in 1986, part of his Improv chain. After a nine-year run, the venue was rebranded as the Riviera Comedy Club. It continued to operate until the property's closure, becoming one of the longest-operating comedy venues in Las Vegas. Other venues would be added to the Riviera over the years, such as the 3,500-seat Royale Pavilion, opened in 1999 as part of the convention space expansion.

Le Bistro Theatre opened in 2002; it was previously a lounge which offered free entertainment. In its early years as a paid venue, it was leased to singer Marlene Ricci, a protege of Sinatra. Aside from performing there, Ricci also subleased the space to other productions. Among these were tribute shows to Sinatra and Neil Diamond, the latter starring impersonator Jay White. Another tribute show was Barbra & Frank: The Concert That Never Was, dedicated to Streisand and Sinatra. It opened at the Le Bistro Theatre in 2005, and ran for several years.

Ice: Direct From Russia opened in the Versailles Theatre in 2007, replacing Splash. The show primarily featured ice-skaters, in addition to acrobats and clowns. It ran until 2009. In need of repairs, the Versailles Theatre also closed that year and never reopened. Plans to renovate the venue were announced at the end of 2014, but were soon scrapped after the Riviera was sold to the LVCVA.

Pat DiNizio, founding member of the band The Smithereens, opened his show Confessions of a Rock Star in 2011. Magician Jan Rouven opened the following year, in the Starlight Theater. In 2013, Red Mercury Entertainment was hired to manage several venues at the Riviera. Within a year, the company launched a male revue known as Men: The Experience, as well as shows dedicated to the doo-wop and Motown genres. Pawn Shop Live! also debuted in 2014, as a spoof of the locally based television program Pawn Stars, with input from the cast. Shortly after debuting, the show was revamped to scale back on the spoof aspect. Despite the changes, the show proved to be short-lived, closing four months after its initial opening.

George Bugatti and Denise Rose were the last singers to perform at the Riviera, doing so on April 25, 2015. Crazy Girls ended its run on May 1, 2015, and the comedy club closed the night before the rest of the property.

== In popular culture ==
The Riviera was often chosen as a shooting location due to its history and recognition as a landmark. It was a major location for the 1995 film Casino, standing in as the fictional Tangiers. Because the film is set in the 1970s and 1980s, the filmmakers needed a property with an appearance matching the time period. The Riviera fulfilled this requirement, and filming took place throughout the resort, most prominently on the casino floor.

After its closure, the Riviera was lit up again in February 2016 and used for the film Jason Bourne, released later that year. Because the Riviera was already set for demolition, the filmmakers were allowed to shoot a scene in which a SWAT truck crashes through its front entrance. Producer Frank Marshall said, "I have always wanted to take a building that was going to be demolished and use that in the movie. So we helped destroy the Riviera." A portion of the interior was decorated to make it appear as a functioning casino floor, based on photos taken prior to the closure. Jason Bourne would be the last film shot at the Riviera.

Other films had also used the resort as a shooting location:

- Ocean's 11 (1960)
- Bob & Carol & Ted & Alice (1969)
- Diamonds Are Forever (1971)
- Fake-Out (1982)
- Showgirls (1995)
- Austin Powers: International Man of Mystery (1997)
- Vegas Vacation (1997)
- Fear and Loathing in Las Vegas (1998)
- 3000 Miles to Graceland (2001)
- Crazy Girls Undercover (2008)
- 21 (2008)
- The Hangover (2009)
- The Trust (2016)
- Who's Driving Doug (2016)

The Riviera also made television appearances. The game show Hollywood Squares taped its final syndicated season there, from 1980 to 1981. Gorgeous Ladies of Wrestling (1986–1990) also shot at the resort for its first two seasons. In addition, the Riviera appeared in a 1998 episode of Chicago Hope, and episodes of Ghost Adventures in 2012 and 2016.

== Sports ==
The Riviera occasionally hosted boxing matches in the 1980s, such as the first match between Larry Holmes and Michael Spinks on September 21, 1985. Spinks won in an upset on a unanimous decision, winning Holmes's International Boxing Federation heavyweight championship, and preventing Holmes from tying Rocky Marciano's undefeated 49–0 record.

In 1994, the Riviera was the host of the practice field for the short lived Las Vegas Posse of the Canadian Football League during the league's brief U.S. expansion. Built on a former parking lot on Riviera property, the Posse practiced on a smaller-than-regulation field (only 70 yards long) where a sign read "Field of ImPOSSEable Dreams." The team folded after the 1994 season.

From the 1990s onward, the Riviera also hosted many pool (pocket billiards) tournaments, from organizations such as the Valley National 8-Ball Association, the Billiard Congress of America, and the American Cuesports Alliance. The American Poolplayers Association held annual events at the resort from 1993 until its closure. The 2015 APA National Singles Championships were the last event to ever be held at the Riviera.
