= Jay White (impersonator) =

Canadian impersonator of Neil Diamond

Jay Albert White is a Canadian impersonator performing concerts in Las Vegas, Nevada. He is a singer, musician, actor and performer.

== Career ==
Born in Kitchener, Ontario, White's career as a Neil Diamond tribute artist began in 1983 in the Salute to the Superstars show at the now-defunct Mr. F's Beef & Bourbon in Sterling Heights, Michigan. He had performed at the club for five years when a mutual friend sent word to Legends in Concert producer John Stuart in Las Vegas, NV.

White was offered a seven-week gig at a Reno casino, and it went so well he packed up and moved in 1989 to Vegas, where he did Diamond duty – 50 weeks a year for nine years – in "Legends in Concert" at the Imperial Palace Hotel and Casino. Jay would become the longest running act at Legends, performing in the hotel for almost nine years. White also was the first person to ever perform with Legends as a "living" legend (a musician still alive). After Legends in Concert, Jay went on to play corporate functions, cruises, and venues as a solo performer with a live band.

Jay left performing as a solo act at the Riviera Hotel and Casino in Las Vegas after a successful 8-year run (2000 shows). Performing as a solo tribute headliner in one venue, Jay's was the longest running act of its kind in the U.S.

In 2008, Jay appeared as Neil Diamond in the Ron Howard-directed movie Frost/Nixon. In 2011, he appeared as Noah Kaminsky in the independent movie Beautiful Noise.

== Personal life ==
Jay is also an accomplished hockey goaltender. He has been playing goal since he was eight years old. His dream was to make it to the NHL one day; the farthest he took his hockey career was a pair of preseason games with the IHL Kalamazoo Wings. White has also played as a backup goaltender for the IHL's now-defunct Las Vegas Thunder, and the ECHL's Las Vegas Wranglers and Florida Everblades.
