= Atlantis Casino Resort Spa =

Hotel and casino in Nevada, United States

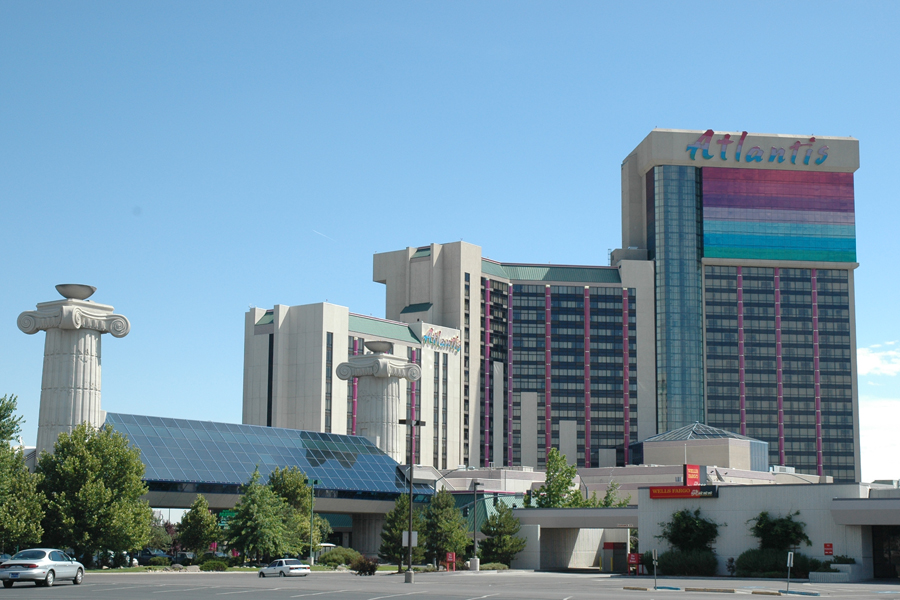
- Interactive map of Atlantis Casino Resort Spa
- Location: Reno, Nevada, United States; 3800 South Virginia Street; 39.488865°N 119.793785°W
- Opened: 1972; 54 years ago
- Theme: Tropical
- No. of rooms: 818
- Gaming space: 64,814 square feet (6,021.4 m^{2})
- Signature attractions: Light Show; Torches; Waterfalls
- Notable restaurants: Atlantis Steakhouse; Bistro Napa; Gourmet Grind; Java etc. Manhattan Deli; Oyster Bar; Red Bloom; Purple Parrot; Sushi Bar on the Sky Terrance; Toucan Charlie's Buffet & Grille
- Owner: Monarch Casino & Resort, Inc.
- Architect: Peter B. Wilday Architects
- Previous names: Golden Road Motor Inn (1972–1979); Travelodge (1979–1986); Quality Inn (1986–1991); Clarion (1991–1996)
- Renovated in: 1991: 160-room hotel Atrium Tower, casino expansion. 1993: 283-room hotel Luxury Tower, indoor pool/sun deck, arcade. 1999: Sky Terrace over South Virginia Street, 824-room hotel Royal Dolphin Tower, pool/health club expansion.
- Website: atlantiscasino.com

The Atlantis Casino Resort Spa (formerly Golden Road Motor Inn, Travelodge, Quality Inn and Clarion) is a hotel and casino located in Reno, Nevada, United States. It is owned and operated by Monarch Casino & Resort, Inc. Its three hotel towers have a combined 824 guest rooms and suites. The casino floor spans 64,814 sq ft. Often known simply as "Atlantis," it is one of Reno's most profitable properties, competing directly with other non-downtown resorts such as Peppermill Hotel Casino and Grand Sierra Resort for customers. Nearly $150 million has been spent on upgrading the facility.

== History ==
=== Golden Road Motor Inn (1972–1979) ===
Prior to 1972, the present-day Atlantis was home to the Golden Road Motor Inn, a 142-room motel. In that year, the property was purchased by the Farahi family. The purchase included with it a restaurant on the site known as the Copper Kettle.

=== Travelodge (1979–1986) ===
Shortly after the purchase, a franchise agreement was signed with Travelodge.

=== Quality Inn (1986–1991) ===
In the late 1980s, a deal was struck with Choice Hotels. As a result, the hotel was renamed Quality Inn and the restaurant became the Purple Parrot.

=== Clarion (1991–1996) ===
In 1991, the hotel was renamed again; under the Choice Hotels lease agreement, they branded the hotel as a Clarion and through the Farahis, constructed a 12-story hotel tower that opened in 1991. The Farahis pledged it would be the first of many expansions to come. Clarion Reno had a tropical theme and when the first tower was built it added more casino and restaurant space.

In 1993, Monarch Casino & Resort, Inc, the Farahis' corporate firm, took over financial responsibility for the Clarion. With this came a public offering on the New York Stock Exchange. With the additional capital from the public offering, Clarion began its second major expansion, which included a second 18-story hotel tower with an additional 400+ rooms, more gaming space and another restaurant, a buffet.

=== Atlantis (1996–present) ===
Desiring to have an independent identity, in 1996, the Monarch Casino & Resort, Inc. Board of Directors made the decision to rename the resort Atlantis. With the new name came plans for yet another expansion. The phase III expansion included a third 27-story hotel tower with close to 650 rooms, an expanded casino, three new restaurants, and the addition of a 40,000 sq ft (3,700 m^{2}) entertainment facility. Additionally, the expansion plans called for a "sky terrace" over Virginia Street that would be anchored by two Greco-Roman columns topped with flame shows that would be hourly. Ground was broken in June 1998, with completion just over a year later, in July 1999. The Sky Terrace opened first, before the new hotel tower and casino expansion. The latest expansion cost $60 million to construct, the most expensive and largest to date in the resort's history, and it redefined the resort entirely.

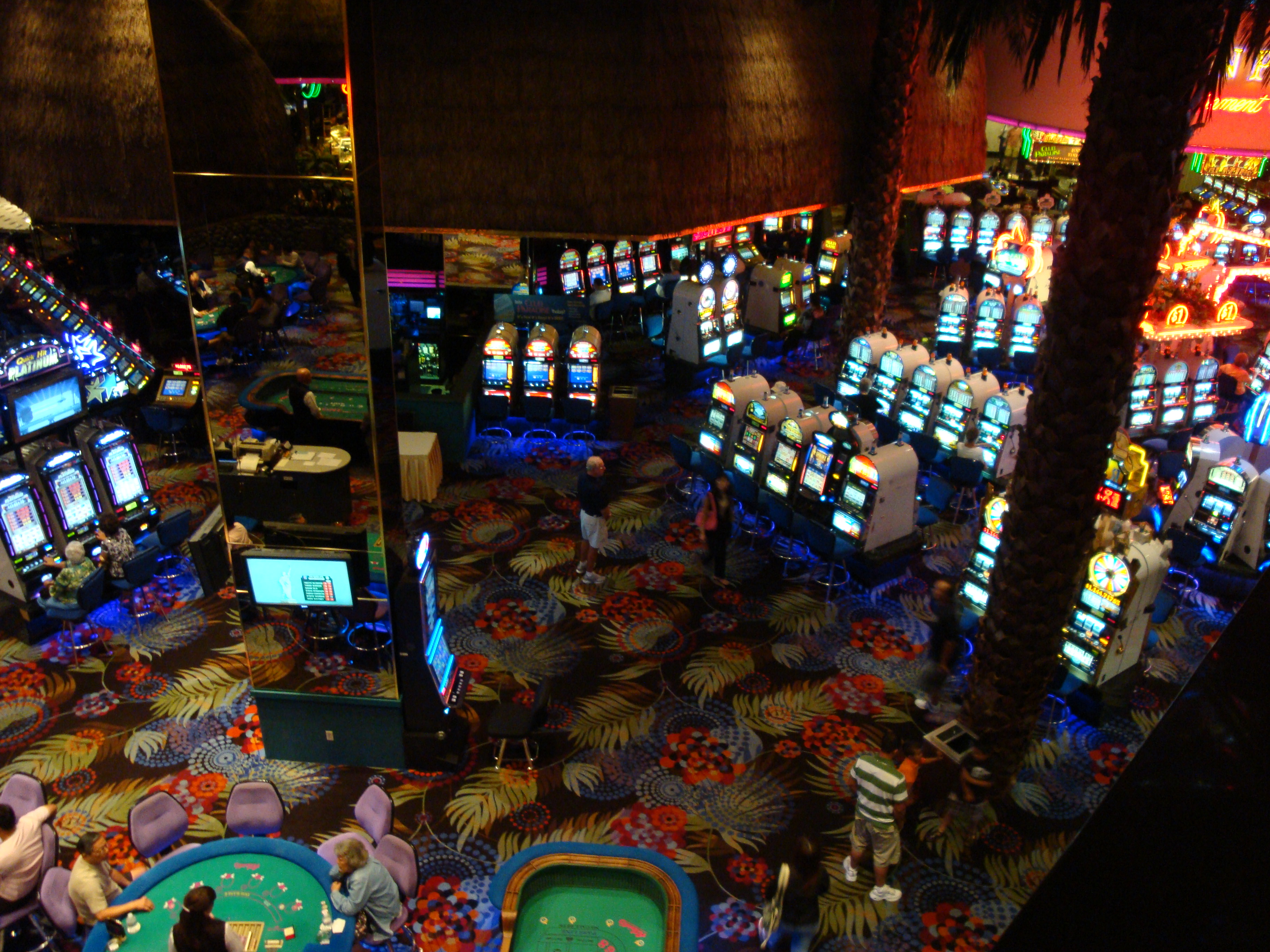
The casino floor at Atlantis

In 2002, Atlantis remodeled its original tower, built back in 1990, and renamed it the "Royal Dolphin Tower." Its rooms were furnished with mahogany accents and warm color tones. There was an extra per night charge for these rooms. The second tower, built in 1994, was remodeled in 2004 with similar furnishings. In 2005 the tower was renamed "Atrium Tower", because of the lobby atrium behind its signature glass elevators.

Since July 2021, the first two towers' (Royal Dolphin, Atrium) rooms are now sold as "Atlantis Tower" and offer the lowest rack rates. The "Luxury" tower rooms are located on floors 3-20 of the newest of the towers. Atlantis has two floors of exclusive VIP suites, which sit on the 26th and 27th floors of Atlantis' third tower and are not available to regular guests unless booked through a party. Atlantis is home to the region's only Concierge Tower, with a concierge lounge on the 25th floor. Atlantis kept in operation its two-story Motor Lodge rooms that was part of the original Golden Road/Travelodge/Quality Inn but closed it down on October 16, 2010, and demolished in the weeks following.

In 2003, Atlantis built a 3,000 sq ft (280 m^{2}) spa and added "spa" under "Resort-Casino" below Atlantis' signature logo. That spa was expanded to 30,000 sq ft (2,800 m^{2}) during the most recent expansion that was completed in January 2009. To match its new "Spa Atlantis" the hotel sequestered a set of rooms on the 3rd floor to be designated as "Spa Rooms" with yoga mats, soothing color tones, yoga channel and specialized bath products.

All rooms in Atlantis' Concierge/Luxury Tower have been completely remodeled; rooms in the Atlantis tower(s) are being updated with modern technology to match the newly remodeled Luxury/Concierge Towers.

== Expansion and improvements ==
Since 2006, the Atlantis has been on a constant improvement program, starting with a $50 million expansion project that was completed in the summer of 2008; that project saw the expansion of the casino floor to include a new Race and Sports Book, high end poker room, and a new bar-lounge. The property also added onto its convention space and constructed an enclosed walkway link to the Reno/Sparks Convention Center, which is next door to the resort.

Following that project, a series of renovation projects were embarked on, including the renovation of all the hotel's guest rooms in phases, a remodel and expansion of the hotel's spa, completed in January 2009, to the remodel of its signature restaurants. The main casino floor was renovated to match the hotel's new refined tropical motif.

New marble, furnishings and accent lighting now flow throughout the property. In 2010, the property demolished its two-story motor lodge buildings on which the resort was founded to add more parking and make room for intended future expansion later.

As of 2026, Atlantis features Northern Nevada's only dedicated Concierge Tower, complete with an exclusive 25th-floor Concierge Lounge accessible only to guests staying on floors 21-27.

CEO and Co-Chairman John Farahi of Monarch Casino & Resort, Inc., which owns Atlantis, has said the company has no plans to stop improving the facility.

== Awards & accolades ==
Over the years, Atlantis has received many prestigious hospitality and travel industry honors.

For over a decade, the property has received the AAA Four Diamond designation and earned recognition from Forbes Travel Guide, with Spa Atlantis receiving a Four-Star Award for 11 consecutive years as of 2026.

Atlantis Steakhouse is Northern Nevada’s only Forbes Four-Star restaurant and the only restaurant in the region to receive Wine Spectator’s Best of Award of Excellence award. Atlantis Steakhouse has won that award for over 25 consecutive years.

Atlantis’ other dining experiences have regularly won awards as well. In 2026, five Atlantis restaurants won the 2026 Tripadvisor Travelers' Choice Award, placing them among the top 10% of restaurants worldwide.

In national travel rankings, Atlantis was named the No. 1 hotel in Reno and received a Best Hotels Gold Badge from U.S. News & World Report in 2025, following prior Gold Badge recognition in 2024. In 2026, the resort was ranked No. 7 Best Casino Outside of Las Vegas in the USA Today 10Best Readers' Choice Awards.

Atlantis has received multiple honors from the Casino Player Best of Gaming Awards, including awards for best rooms, spa, and VIP services.

== See also ==
- Monarch Casino Resort Spa, owned by the same company
