= King Arthur and His Knights of the Round Table =

1953 book by Roger Lancelyn Green

- 1953 edition
- Author: Roger Lancelyn Green
- Illustrator: Lotte Reiniger
- Language: English
- Subject: Arthurian legend
- Publisher: Puffin Books
- Publication date: 1953
- Publication place: England
- Media type: Print
- Pages: 355

King Arthur and the Knights of the Round Table is a retelling of the Arthurian legends, principally Thomas Malory's Le Morte d'Arthur, by Roger Lancelyn Green. It was intended for children. It was first published by Puffin Books in 1953 and has since been reprinted many times. In 2008, it was reissued in the Puffin Classics series with an introduction by David Almond (the author of Clay, Skellig, Kit's Wilderness, and The Fire-Eaters), and the original illustrations by Lotte Reiniger.

== Composition ==
Green set out to weave together the many legends surrounding King Arthur into a single narrative. Thinking that Malory's work was more of a loose collection of separate story lines, Green attempted to tell a cohesive story with beginning, middle, and end. He drew from many other medieval sources, but mainly Malory, particularly so in the last section in which they had a strong connection between his life as well in a more spiritual and religious context of life than any one person has had before of the book.

== Synopsis ==
Uther Pendragon, king of Britons, and defender of Britain against the Saxons has died. On Christmas Day, Merlin the magician gathers many knights outside a church. A sword, stuck fast to an anvil, in turn on top of a marble stone, appears. No knight can remove the sword from the anvil.

After many years, the young Arthur, secretly the son of Uther Pendragon, pulls the sword out of the stone. He becomes king. With the guidance of Merlin, he constructs a round table, at which only the best knights of Britain may sit. More and more knights come to join the brotherhood of the Round Table, and each has his own adventures.

Eventually, the holy knight Galahad comes to Arthur's court. With his coming, all the knights ride throughout Europe in search of the Holy Grail of Jesus Christ. Only five knights see the Grail; Sir Lancelot, Sir Percival, Sir Bors de Gaunnes, Sir Galahad, and Sir Gawain.

After the Grail is found, the last battle of the Knights of the Round Table is fought. Many knights fall in battle, including Sir Gawain. King Arthur is taken away to Avalon, a secret island, after he is terribly wounded while slaying Mordred, the wicked son of King Arthur and his half-sister Morgana le Fay.

== See also ==
- The Boy's King Arthur (1880) — a different children's edition that was republished under this name in 1950
