= My Name Is Mina =

2010 children's novel by David Almond

- First edition
- Author: David Almond
- Language: English
- Genre: Children's fiction
- Published: 2010 (Hodder Children's Books)
- Publication place: England
- Media type: Print (hardback)
- Pages: 300
- ISBN: 9780340997260
- OCLC: 765619939

My Name Is Mina is a 2010 children's novel by David Almond. It is a prequel to Skellig and is about Mina, a homeschooled girl who lives across the road from the house that Michael's family moves into at the beginning of Skellig. The novel takes the form of a stream of consciousness journal. It is written in a way that shows us Mina's opinions.

== Reception ==
Booklist, in a starred review of My Name Is Mina, wrote "Almond is rather brave to have written a prequel to Skellig (1998), a book that was the essence of originality. So many things could have gone wrong. But he is too shrewd—and fine—a writer to let that happen"; and Kirkus Reviews found it "A fascinating, if breathless ramble through the cosmos."

The School Library Journal wrote "Almond portrays Mina as a girl with a great love of words and learning, and he plays joyfully with language. This might make for tricky going for some readers, but it is truly a wonderful book."; and VOYA called it "a lyrical, whimsical novel". A Guardian reviewer wrote that it is "a wonderful book in its own right" and "joyous."

My Name Is Mina has also been reviewed by Publishers Weekly, Library Media Connection magazine, The Horn Book, The Use of English magazine, Bookmarks, Reading Time, School Librarian. BookTrust, The Deakin Review of Children's Literature, The New York Times, and the National Post.

It was shortlisted for the 2012 Carnegie Medal and the 2011 Guardian Children's Fiction Prize.
