= The Boy Who Swam with Piranhas =

2012 book by David Almond

- First edition
- Author: David Almond
- Illustrator: Oliver Jeffers
- Language: English
- Genre: Children's fiction
- Published: 2012 (Walker Books)
- Publication place: England
- Media type: Print (hardback)
- Pages: 246
- ISBN: 9781406320763

The Boy Who Swam with Piranhas is a 2012 book by David Almond. It is about a boy, Stanley, who runs away from home and joins the circus.

== Reception ==
A BookTrust review of The Boy Who Swam with Piranhas wrote "Full of surreal, fairy-tale touches, this is an joyful and warm story of self-discovery, perfectly accompanied by the quirky illustrations by Oliver Jeffers." and The Guardian wrote "Almond has produced a circus ride of a story, with thrills and spills and all the fun of the fair."

Publishers Weekly called it "Bold, imaginative, and funny" and a Kirkus Reviews starred review wrote "Almond’s wonderstruck philosophical bent, earthy humor, lovely use of language and colorful characters keep readers swimming along, as does the personable narrator who playfully demands an examination of the storytelling process as it happens. Jeffers’ spare, cartoonish pencil sketches perfectly suit the salty, magical tale."

The Boy Who Swam With Piranhas has also been reviewed by Booklist, Library Media Connection magazine, The Horn Book Magazine, The School Library Journal, Reading Time, School Librarian, and The Bulletin of the Center for Children's Books,

It was on the 2013 Blue Peter Book Award shortlist for Best Story and the 2013 Guardian Children's Fiction Prize shortlist.
