= Margaret Meek Spencer =

British educationalist (1925–2020)

Margaret Meek
- Born: 14 January 1925; Leven, Fife, Scotland, UK
- Died: 4 May 2020 (aged 95)

Margaret Meek or Margaret Meek Spencer (14 January 1925 – 4 May 2020) was an influential British educationalist in the field of literacy.

== Life ==
Meek was born in Leven, Fife to Robert and Elisabeth Meek. She studied English Literature and Philosophy at the University of Edinburgh before becoming a teacher. Her specialism became the teaching of reading and during her academic career she wrote and lectured about the ways that children learn reading skills. She taught at the Institute of Education, University of London from 1968 until retirement in 1990, when she became Emeritus Reader in Education.

== Early life and career ==
At the age of 10, Meek and her family moved to Dunfermline. After her studies at Edinburgh Meek took a job at Haberdashers’ Aske's school for girls (in Acton, London) where she taught English from 1950 until 1954. On leaving that role, she moved to the University of Leeds as a research assistant for the educationist Roy Niblett, then on to the University of Bristol where she worked in teacher education. She married Patrick Spencer in 1960, but wrote as "Margaret Meek". It was at the School of Education, London University where she started to tutor and lecture students who have become prominent figures in the field of children's literature. The UK Children's Laureate from 2007 to 2009, Michael Rosen states that she supervised his postgraduate work and continued that support through her life. She was also the editor of "The School Librarian" where she reviewed the work of children's authors, for example, David Almond's book The True Tale of the Monster Billy Dean.

== Books ==
- The Cool Web (1978)
- Learning to Read (1982), ISBN 9780099423058
- On Being Literate (1971), ISBN 9780370311906
- How Texts Teach What Readers Learn (1988), ISBN 9780903355230

. Language and Literacy in the Primary School (1988) with Colin Mills. Routledge/Falmer

- Coming of Age in Children's Literature, with Victor Watson, ISBN 9780826458421
- Information and Book Learning (2003), ISBN 9780903355490

== Awards ==
- Eleanor Farjeon Award for Services to Children's Literature (1971)
