= Slog's Dad =

- Short story by David Almond
- 2010 Graphic novel
- Country: England
- Language: English
- Genre: Young adult fiction

Publication
- Published in: So, what kept you?: new stories inspired by Anton Chekhov and Raymond Carver
- Publication type: anthology
- Publisher: Flambard Press/New Writing North
- Media type: Paperback
- Publication date: 2006 (short story); 2010 (Graphic novel)

Slog's Dad is a 2006 short story by David Almond and is about a boy called Slog who, sees a man he believes is his father returned from death to visit him. It was originally published in a collection of short stories and subsequently released, in 2010, as a stand-alone graphic novel illustrated by Dave McKean.

== Publication history ==
Slog's Dad appeared in the following publications:

- So, what kept you?: new stories inspired by Anton Chekhov and Raymond Carver, Claire Malcolm and Margaret Wilkinson, Flambard Press/New Writing North 2006, England, ISBN 9781873226841, paperback
- The National Short Story Prize 2007 2007, England, Atlantic ISBN 9781843546641, paperback

before being published as a stand-alone graphic novel:

- Slog's Dad 2010, England, Walker Books ISBN 9781406322903, hardback
- Slog's Dad 2011, USA, Candlewick Press ISBN 9780763649401, hardback

== Reception ==
A Booktrust review of Slog's Dad called it "A poignant and sensitive story of grief and loss". Publishers Weekly in a starred review wrote "Another haunting and beautiful book from the U.K. team that produced The Savage in 2008." and "The volume is richly and poetically illustrated by McKean."

It has also been reviewed by Booklist, the School Library Journal, the Horn Book, Voice of Youth Advocates.

== Awards and nominations ==
- 2007 BBC National Short Story Award - finalist
- 2012 Kate Greenaway Medal - shortlist
