= Jackdaw Summer =

2008 book by David Almond

- First edition
- Author: David Almond
- Language: English
- Genre: Children's fiction
- Published: 2008 (Hodder Children's Books)
- Publication place: England
- Media type: Print (hardback)
- Pages: 219
- ISBN: 9780340881989
- OCLC: 782010168

Jackdaw Summer (US. title Raven Summer) is a 2008 book by David Almond. It is about two boys, Liam and Max, who, on following a jackdaw, find an abandoned baby.

== Reception ==
A BookTrust review wrote "Friendship, loyalty and truth are explored through a cast of complex characters in this compelling story. While often tense, it ends on a note of hope." and The Guardian wrote "This is a thoughtful and claustrophobic snapshot of people's lives, showing how they have come to be who they are that one summer. This may not be Almond's best book to date, but he has only himself to blame for having set the bar so high; Jackdaw Summer is a wonderful piece of writing for children - unsettling yet poetic."

Publishers Weekly in a starred review, wrote "In a thought-provoking coming-of-age story, British writer Almond (Skellig; Clay ) delves into the darkest realm of the human psyche as he expresses the conflicting urges of an adolescent." "Almond tackles complex questions about humanity from multiple points of view; flashes of wisdom—sometimes painful, sometimes uplifting—arrive at unexpected moments." and Common Sense Media called it "a unique find." A Kirkus Reviews starred review wrote "With a storyteller’s flair and a poet’s precision, Almond reveals the fierce intensity of childhood, and this rare acknowledgment permeates his latest novel set in England’s Northumberland in the time of Bush and Blair." and called it a "hypnotic, sensuous foray into the nature of war, truth, art and the savagery of humanity."

Jackdaw Summer has also been reviewed by Viewpoint: on books for young adults, Booklist, BookPage, Library Media Connection magazine, The Horn Book Magazine, The School Library Journal, VOYA, The Bulletin of the Center for Children's Books, Reading Time, and School Librarian.
