= Secret Heart =

Secret Heart may refer to:

- "Secret Heart", a jewelry brand by SDI AG, Switzerland
- "Secret Heart", a song by The Monkees from their 1987 album Pool It!
- "My Secret Heart", a song by Kylie Minogue from her 1989 album Enjoy Yourself
- "Secret Heart", a song by Ron Sexsmith from his 1995 album Ron Sexsmith
  - "Secret Heart", a cover of this song by Rod Stewart from his 1998 album When We Were the New Boys
  - "Secret Heart", a cover of this song by Feist from her 2005 album Let It Die
  - "Secret Heart", a cover of this song by Katey Sagal from her 2013 album Covered
- Secret Heart, a 3-part National Geographic documentary about the functions of the heart (2007)
- Secret Heart (book), a children's book by David Almond
- The Secret Heart, a 1946 film
