= The Savage (novel) =

2008 graphic novel by David Almond

- First edition
- Author: David Almond
- Illustrator: David McKean
- Language: English
- Genre: Young adult graphic novel, Fantasy
- Published: 2008 (Walker Books)
- Publication place: England
- Media type: Print (hardback)
- Pages: 78
- ISBN: 9781406308150
- OCLC: 799016444

The Savage is a 2008 graphic novel by David Almond. It is about a boy called Blue who, to cope with his father's death starts drawing and writing a comic book story about a wild boy living in the woods.

== Reception ==
In a School Library Journal review of the day, Elizabeth Bird wrote "By all logic, the melding of Dave McKean to David Almond should be a bad idea. .. Yet my encounter with The Savage came as a bit of a surprise to me. As feared it definitely has a slightly older readership, but the darkness of the images and the text work together in ways that actually reduce the scary factor rather than increase it.", and described McKean’s illustrations as "It’s Where the Wild Things Are, shot through with teeth and flesh."

Booktrust found that "Almond’s revelations about child grief, as ever, are unsettling, as are McKean’s tortured illustrations, but as the book progresses we witness Blue achieving a degree of acceptance, and an unworldly resolution." and Kirkus Reviews called it a "provocative outing."

The Savage has also been reviewed by The Bulletin of the Center for Children's Books, Booklist, Horn Book Magazine, Michigan Reading Journal, School Librarian, Library Media Connection, and Reading Time.

== Awards and nominations ==
- 2008 Cybils Award Graphic Novels (Young Adult) - nominated
- 2009 Kate Greenaway Medal - shortlist
- 2009 American Library Association Best Books for Young Adults

== Adaptations ==
Almond has written a stage adaption of The Savage. It has been performed by the Live Theatre Company and has received favourable reviews.

In 2009 The Savage was adapted for the stage by Jenifer Toksvig with music by Nicholas Sutton for the youth theatre at the Arcola Theatre, directed by Thomas Hescott.
