= Bill Milner =

English actor (born 1995)

- Born: William Henry Milner; 4 March 1995 (age 31); London, England
- Occupation: Actor
- Years active: 2007–present

William Henry Milner (born 4 March 1995) is an English actor. He starred as Will Proudfoot in Son of Rambow (2007), Edward in Is Anybody There? (2008), and the young Erik Lensherr in X-Men: First Class (2011).

== Personal life ==
William Henry Milner was born on 4 March 1995 in Teddington, London. He grew up in Hampton, London.

Milner is queer.

== Career ==
Milner made his acting debut in the Hammer & Tongs film Son of Rambow (2007). That same year, he appeared in the made-for-TV films Who Killed Mrs De Ropp? and My Boy Jack. Milner then starred alongside Michael Caine in Is Anybody There? (2008). He appeared in the film adaptation of the David Almond book Skellig (2009). Milner portrayed Ian Dury's son Baxter in the biopic Sex & Drugs & Rock & Roll (2010). He played the role of young Erik Lensherr / Magneto in the superhero film X-Men: First Class (2011). He played the role of Tom Harvey in the Netflix film, iBoy (2017).

== Filmography ==
=== Film ===
Year	Title	Role	Notes	Ref.
2007	Son of Rambow	Will Proudfoot		
2007	Who Killed Mrs De Ropp?	Nicholas	Television film	
2007	My Boy Jack	Peter Carter	Television film	
2008	Is Anybody There?	Edward		
2008	Pop Art	Toby Warner	Short film	
2009	Skellig	Michael Cooper	Television film	
2009	Mixtape	Ben	Short film	
2010	Sex & Drugs & Rock & Roll	Baxter Dury		
2010	Disco	Danny	Short film	
2011	X-Men: First Class	Young Erik		
2012	Broken	Jed		
2013	Locke	Sean Locke		
2015	Winter	Max		
2016	Anthropoid	Ata Moravec		
2017	iBoy	Tom Harvey / iBoy		
2017	Dunkirk	Lone Private		
2017	The Lodgers	Edward		
2018	Stomping Grounds	Monroe	Short film	
2018	Apostle	Jeremy		
2018	White Lies	Rory	Short film	
2019	Summer Night	Jack "Rabbit"		
2019	Waiting for the Barbarians	Garrison Soldier 5		
2021	Cyn	John	Short film	
2022	Burial	Iossif Gulyaev		
2023	Bonus Track	Skinny Rick		
2024	Midas Man	Clive Epstein		
TBA	Yeti †	TBA	Filming	

=== Television ===
Year	Title	Role	Notes	Ref.
2012	The Secret of Crickley Hall	Maurice Stafford	Miniseries; 3 episodes	
2014	The 7.39	Adam Matthews	Miniseries; 2 episodes	
2014	The Job Lot	Michael Jennings	Episode: "MP"	
2022	The Flatshare	Si	Recurring role; 5 episodes	
2023	A Small Light	Tonny Ahlers	Recurring role; 3 episodes	
2024	The Serpent Queen	King Charles IX	Series regular; 8 episodes	

=== Music videos ===
- Tame Impala – "Mind Mischief" (2012)

== Awards and nominations ==
Year	Award	Work	Result
2007	British Independent Film Award for Most Promising Newcomer	Son of Rambow	Nominated
2007	Young Artist Award for Best Performance in an International Feature Film – Leading Young Performers (with Will Poulter)	Son of Rambow	Nominated
2008	London Critics Circle Film Award for Young British Performer of the Year	Is Anybody There?	Nominated
2010	London Critics Circle Film Award for Young British Performer of the Year	Sex & Drugs & Rock & Roll	Nominated
