= Counting Stars (Almond book) =

2000 anthology by David Almond

- First edition
- Author: David Almond
- Language: English
- Genre: Young adult fiction, anthology
- Published: 2000 (Hodder Children's Books)
- Publication place: England
- Media type: Print (hardback)
- Pages: 182
- ISBN: 9780340784792
- OCLC: 51094402

Counting Stars is a 2000 anthology by David Almond. It is a collection of eighteen semi-autobiographical stories from Almond's childhood in North East England.

== Reception ==
A Booktrust review of Counting Stars wrote "This evocative collection of short stories gives a clear insight into the experiences which lie behind David Almond's novels..". A starred review by Publishers Weekly called it an "evocative collection of autobiographical vignettes", and Kirkus Reviews concluded "Some of his experiences are shocking, some uplifting, obliquely amusing, even magical; this is not light or easy reading, but few who tackle it will come away unmoved."

Booklist wrote "As with his other books, some of Almond's best writing combines the fragile and the grotesque, especially in the exquisite stories about the coming of the circus and the carnival." and the School Library Journal although finding "The chronological and cultural gap that separates Almond's youth from that of modern children is so palpable in these stories that many readers will feel overwhelmed and perhaps even discouraged." concluded "Tenacious ones, however, will be rewarded with a captivating portrait of Almond the child, whose life experiences helped produce Almond the writer and his eloquent body of literature."

Counting Stars has also been reviewed by the Horn Book, and Voice of Youth Advocates.
