= The True Tale of the Monster Billy Dean =

2011 book by David Almond

The True Tale of the Monster Billy Dean telt by hisself
- First edition (Puffin)
- Author: David Almond
- Language: English
- Genre: Children's fiction, Dystopian fiction
- Published: 2011 (Puffin)
- Publication place: England
- Media type: Print (hardback)
- Pages: 272
- ISBN: 9780141332048
- OCLC: 751787176

The True Tale of the Monster Billy Dean telt by hisself is a 2011 story by David Almond. It was released simultaneously in young adult (Puffin) and adult editions (Penguin), and was Almond's first adult novel. It is about a boy, Paul, who is imprisoned by his parents until the age of thirteen and on his freedom is treated as a messiah.

== Reception ==
A Booktrust review of The True Tale of the Monster Billy Dean wrote "This is not an easy read, not least because Billy tells his story in non-standard, phonetic language to which readers need to adjust. .. Complex and difficult issues are reflected in both narrative style and content." and in a starred review Kirkus Reviews wrote "Dark, unsettling and fluid as water, Almond’s suspenseful tour de force considers the cycle of life, themes of war, God and godlessness, and, as ever, “How all things flow into each other.”"

The School Library Journal called it a "challenging title"; the Horn Book, "Rich, dense, and memorable.", while Library Media Connection magazine highlighted its style of writing, "It is also extremely difficult to read as it is written phonetically with a British accent .. Because I found it difficult to slog through the spelling, sometimes having to reread lines, my concern is that only the most persistent readers will stick with it."

The True Tale of the Monster Billy Dean has also been reviewed by Publishers Weekly, The Bulletin of the Center for Children's Books, Irish Farmers Monthly, Reading Time, and School Librarian.
