= My Dad's a Birdman =

2007 novel by David Almond

- First edition
- Author: David Almond
- Illustrator: Polly Dunbar
- Language: English
- Genre: Children's fiction
- Published: 2007 (Walker Books)
- Publication place: England
- Media type: Print (hardback)
- Pages: 117
- ISBN: 9781406304862
- OCLC: 156891239

My Dad's a Birdman is a 2007 children's illustrated novel by David Almond. It is about a girl, Lizzie, who finds herself looking after her dad, Jackie, after the death of her mother, and his dreams of competing in "The Great Human Bird Competition".

== Reception ==
A Booktrust review of My Dad's a Birdman wrote "This charmingly illustrated, funny, fast-paced, seemingly simple story, is also beautifully tender and profound." and Kirkus Reviews wrote "The characters sport silly names like Doreen Doody and Mr. Poop, and Dunbar's colored illustrations, which appear on nearly every spread, evoke Quentin Blake. Readers will definitely come away with mixed feelings—not necessarily a bad thing, to be sure."

Booklist concluded its review with, "As always, however, Almond writes beautifully, and though particular moments may give pause, this novel is a tribute to the human spirit." The School Library Journal wrote "A distinguished author's use of birds and human flight as metaphors for love's transcendence over grief and death takes a new form in this comic piece of magical realism" and called it "a fine read-aloud". The Horn Book wrote, "Almond flies where make-believe and madness converge, where imagination tends toward delusion, offering a stylized treatment of grief that expresses sorrow obliquely. The energy and color of his language—"the blithering boops. The nits, the ninnies, the nincompoopy noodleheads!"—and the surrealism of his imagery give this strange little tale a haunting brilliance."

My Dad's a Birdman has also been reviewed by Reading Time, Library Media Connection magazine, and The Bulletin of the Center for Children's Books.

== Theatre adaptation ==
In 2010/2011 a play based on the book was performed at the Young Vic theatre featuring original music by Neil Tennant and Chris Lowe. Three of the songs are featured as demo versions on the Pet Shop Boys album Yes: Further Listening 2008–2010.
