= The Boy Who Climbed Into the Moon =

2010 novel by David Almond

- Author: David Almond
- Illustrator: Polly Dunbar
- Language: English
- Genre: Children's fiction, fantasy, fable
- Published: 2010 (Walker Books)
- Publication place: England
- Media type: Print (hardback)
- Pages: 117
- ISBN: 9781406314571
- OCLC: 489634191

The Boy Who Climbed Into the Moon is a 2010 children's novel by David Almond, illustrated by Polly Dunbar. It is about a boy, Paul, who wants to touch the sky; he climbs a ladder to the Moon and goes inside.

== Reception ==
A Booktrust review of The Boy Who Climbed Into the Moon wrote "Beautiful colour illustrations complement a surreal modern fairytale, which fluent young readers will enjoy on their own but which could equally well be read aloud." and in a starred review Kirkus Reviews wrote "Roald Dahl meets Antoine de Saint-Exupéry in this delightfully improbable tale .. Madmen are heroes and crackpots are geniuses in this charmingly over-the-top read-aloud that challenges readers to imagine the impossible. Dunbar’s abundant full-color illustrations perfectly capture the beautiful barminess of it all."

A Guardian review found it "charming without being twee; quirky without being whimsical; and genuinely thought-provoking without being clever-clever." Booklist called it a "quirky tale" while the School Library Journal referred to "the thematically overstuffed, disjointed, and arbitrary plot". The Horn Book found it "Part Little Prince and part Phantom Tollbooth"

The Boy Who Climbed Into the Moon has also been reviewed by Publishers Weekly, Common Sense Media, and The Bulletin of the Center for Children's Books.
