= The Tightrope Walkers =

2014 novel written by David Almond

- First edition
- Author: David Almond
- Language: English
- Genre: Fiction
- Published: 2014 (Penguin Books)
- Publication place: England
- Media type: Print (hardback)
- Pages: 275
- ISBN: 9780241003237
- OCLC: 941638633

The Tightrope Walkers is a 2014 novel written by David Almond and is Almond's second adult novel. It is about Dominic Hall growing up in 1960s North East England. A young adult version was released in America in 2015.

== Reception ==
A Guardian review of The Tightrope Walkers wrote "Even in writing for adults, .. Almond threads the fantastical and imaginate through the drabness of the mundane, alternating lyricism with rough realism." and The New York Times wrote "Almond’s rough, beautiful world of books and ships, sinners and saints is a lyrical reminder of how, when we lose our equilibrium, art can redeem us."

Kirkus Reviews and Publishers Weekly both gave starred reviews.

The Tightrope Walkers has also been reviewed by Booklist, BookPage Reviews, Voice of Youth Advocates magazine, The Horn Book Magazine, School Library Connection, The School Library Journal, the Historical Novel Society, The Bulletin of the Center for Children's Books.

An audio version received a 2015 Earphones Award. It was also a 2016 Cooperative Children’s Book Center Fiction for Young Adults Choice.
