= Skellig (film) =

- Written by: Irena Brignull; David Almond
- Directed by: Annabel Jankel
- Starring: Tim Roth; Bill Milner; Skye Bennett; John Simm; Kelly Macdonald; Jermaine Allen
- Theme music composer: Step Warbeck
- Country of origin: United Kingdom
- Original language: English

Production
- Producer: Nick Hirschkorn
- Running time: 102 minutes

Original release
- Release: 12 April 2009

Skellig (also known as Skellig: The Owl Man) is a 2009 British fantasy television film directed by Annabel Jankel and starring Tim Roth in the title role. The screenplay by Irena Brignull is based on David Almond's novel of the same name.

== Plot ==
Secondary school student Michael Cooper moves to a decrepit house with his parents. Soon after, his baby sister is born. The newborn baby is found to be suffering from a heart condition and is sent to the hospital. Michael investigates the dilapidated garden shed and meets Skellig, a man with owl wings. Michael befriends a girl named Mina, who is equally intrigued by Skellig. When the couple argue about moving away, Michael brings Skellig outside and his father, Dave, burns the shed. Michael and Mina take Skellig to a tall tower, where Skellig reveals his magical ability. The condition of the baby worsens and Michael frequently visits the hospital, where he meets a dying woman named Grace. Encouraged by Michael, Skellig allegedly visits the hospital to save the girl, whom Michael and his parents named Grace Joy. Some time later, Skellig spends time with Michael and Mina.

== Cast ==
- Tim Roth as Skellig
- Bill Milner as Michael Cooper
- Skye Bennett as Mina
- Kelly Macdonald as Louise
- John Simm as Dave
- Jermaine Allen as Leakey
- Edna Doré as Grace
- Eros Vlahos as Coot
- Alexander Armstrong as Mr. Hunt
- Navin Chowdhry as Mr. Watson
- Nickie Rainsford as Mina's mother
- Tameka Empson as Nurse #1
- Lisa Zahra as Nurse #2
- Corey Brown as Schoolboy

== Production ==
The film was part of Sky One's plan to invest £10 million in producing three new high-definition dramas. Filming began in Caerphilly on 2 September 2008, with scenes shot in Cardiff, Wales. Roth joined the cast for the film. It was written by Brignull and directed by Jankel. The film premiered on 12 April 2009.

== Awards ==
- Won - Cinekid Film Award - Honorable Mention
- Nominated - RTS Television Award for Best Effects in Picture Enhancement
- Nominated - RTS Television Award for Best Effects in Special Effects
- Nominated - RTS Television Award for Best Make-Up Design
- Nominated - VES Awards for Outstanding Visual Effects in a Broadcast Mini-Series or Series
- Nominated - PI.CA for Everything
