= Kate, the Cat and the Moon =

2004 picture book by David Almond

- Author: David Almond
- Illustrator: Stephen Lambert
- Language: English
- Genre: Children's picture book
- Published: 2004 (Hodder Children's Books)
- Publication place: England
- Media type: Print (hardback)
- Pages: 32 (unpaginated)
- ISBN: 9780340773871
- OCLC: 731419051

Kate, the Cat and the Moon is a 2004 Children's picture book by David Almond and Stephen Lambert. It is about a girl, Kate, and her nighttime adventures with a feline companion when she transforms into a cat.

== Reception ==
In a review of Kate, the Cat and the Moon, Booklist wrote "Almond, .. writes beautifully about Kate's foray into the night, .. Lambert's thickly applied colors and strong, sturdy shapes give the art a robust, muscular feel that balances the dreamy conceit." and the School Library Journal wrote "This bedtime fantasy is sure to earn Almond new fans." concluding "This book will charm feline fanatics everywhere." Kirkus Reviews wrote "The slightly mystical quality of Almond’s text seems somewhat mismatched with Lambert’s gleeful but more solid visuals. One hopes that Almond will do more picture books with less grounded illustrations that let his odd spiritual tone show through; this one, meanwhile, is a lovely and safe adventure."

It has been called a "small, lyric gem.", and "Simple and elegant".

Kate, the Cat and the Moon has also been reviewed by Reading Time, and the Library Media Connection magazine.
