= Heaven Eyes =

2000 novel by David Almond

- First hardback edition
- Author: David Almond
- Language: English
- Genre: Young adult novel
- Publisher: Hodder Children's Books
- Publication date: 2000
- Publication place: United Kingdom
- Media type: Print (Hardback & Paperback)
- ISBN: 978-0-385-32770-1

Heaven Eyes is a young adult novel by author David Almond. It was published in Great Britain by Hodder Children's Books in 2000 and by Delacorte Press in the United States in 2001. A paperback version was released in 2002 by Dell Laurel Leaf.

Heaven's Eyes was adapted as a stage production, which premiered in Edinburgh in 2005.

== Plot summary ==
The story focuses on three children who run away from their orphanage and are rescued by Heaven Eyes, a strange, innocent child with webbed hands and feet. The sole survivor of a shipwreck, Heaven Eyes was rescued by the elderly caretaker of a gigantic old printing press and storage building. He raises her lovingly and she calls him her Grandpa

== Major themes ==
Like most of Almond's other young adult books, Heaven Eyes focuses on the balance between fantasy and reality, all within a quaint and eccentric but mysterious and somewhat unsettling world. Other major themes include spiritual healing and family (particularly mothers, as many of the main characters long for a mother they have never known or have known but tragically lost).

== Writing ==
When Almond began writing the novel, he felt that Erin should be the main character because she was the strongest and because he wanted to write from the point of view of a girl this time. Almond referred to the novel's opening line, "My name is Erin Law", as a "bit of an homage" to the opening line of Moby Dick, "Call me Ishmael." The abandoned building in the novel was inspired by a real building located on a "sludgy river gully" near the Tyne, which has been turned into Seven Stories, an attraction that promotes literature.

== Characters ==
=== Major characters ===
- Erin Law is the novel's main protagonist. She is an earnest, emotional, rebellious, adventurous child. She deeply feels the loss of her mother. Erin's mother lived with her in a house with a beautiful garden, and Erin often "speaks" with the memory of her mother and visualizes that place. The novel takes her on a spiritual quest for family.
- January Carr is another child living at Whitegates. He is very much like Erin, although somewhat more distrustful. He secretly believes that his mother is a beautiful, very young woman who will return for him when she is older and more able to care for him).
- Mouse Gullane is a younger child who enjoys digging in the dirt and finding small plastic toys and other artifacts. He hopes to one day uncover something much more important buried in the earth. He has a pet mouse named Squeak. He is an abandoned child.
- Heaven Eyes is the strange pale child with a mysterious past who rescues Erin and her friends. She appears to be friendly but has very odd customs.
- Grampa is the eccentric, seemingly deranged man who takes care of Heaven Eyes. He has dark hair and a beard and wears a jacket that says "Security" on it. Grampa is constantly writing in a book in which he records every thing he sees in and around the Middens, from the wildlife to the number of pop bottles. He considers all outsiders to be "ghosts".
- Maureen is the woman who runs Whitegates. She tries hard to care for the children, but can't help seeing them as "damaged". She also can't hide her disappointment at not having children of her own, and tells Erin that she is the daughter she dreams of.

=== Minor characters ===
- Wilson Cairns is an obese, bespectacled boy who was taken away from his violent, abusive parents. He is calm, kind and introverted. He carries clay with him wherever he goes and claims that if one were to believe hard enough, one would be able to bring his clay figures to life.
- Fat Kev and Skinny Stu are Maureen's assistants, two sleazy men who only care about their paycheck and not about the children.
- Hairy
