= Felling Town Hall =

Municipal building in Felling, Tyne and Wear, England

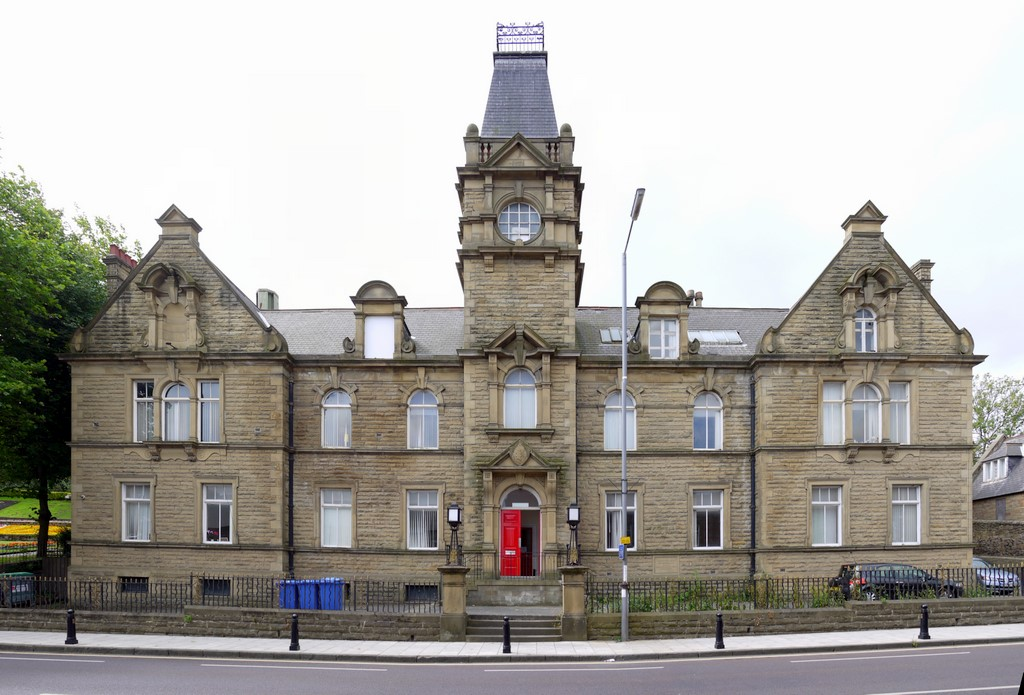
- The building in 2010

- Shown in Tyne and Wear
- 54.9517°N 1.5674°W
- Location: Sunderland Road, Felling

History
- Built: 1903

Site notes
- Architect: Henry Miller
- Architectural style: Baroque Revival style

Listed Building – Grade II
- Official name: Gateshead District Housing Offices
- Designated: 18 November 1985
- Reference no.: 1299836

Felling Town Hall, formerly Felling Council Offices, is a former municipal building in Sunderland Road, Felling, Tyne and Wear, England. The building, which is currently in residential use, is a Grade II listed building.

== History ==
Following significant population growth, largely associated with the mining industry, a local board of health was established in Felling in 1868. The local board established its offices in the committee rooms of the Felling Store Co-operative Society before relocating to 4 Wesley Terrace in 1873. After the Felling Local Board of Health was replaced by Felling Urban District Council in 1894, the council officers for the new council were initially based in the offices in Wesley Terrace. After finding this arrangement unsatisfactory, the new council decided to commission dedicated offices. The site they selected was open ground on the south side of Sunderland Road.

The foundation stone for the new building was laid by John Simpson, the chairman of the council, in January 1902. It was designed by the council surveyor, Henry Miller, in the Baroque Revival style, built by John Wilkinson in rubble masonry with ashlar stone dressings and was officially opened on 2 March 1903. The design involved a symmetrical main frontage of seven bays facing onto Sunderland Road. A park was laid out to the east of the building and opened in July 1910.

The building continued to serve as the headquarters of the district council for much of the 20th century, but ceased to be the local seat of government when the enlarged Gateshead Borough Council was formed in 1974. The final meeting of the council, held in the council chamber on 28 March 1974, concluded with speeches and a rendition of the Hokey Cokey. The building subsequently served as the area offices for Gateshead Borough Council's housing department, and was grade II listed in 1985.

The building was declared surplus to requirements in the early 1990s, and was subsequently made available for use as a temporary accommodation. In September 2023, planning consent was granted to convert the building into 14 apartments.

== Architecture ==
The building is constructed of sandstone, with a slate roof. It has two storeys and a basement, with a central four-stage tower, which is projected forward. The tower incorporates a doorway with a semi-circular fanlight flanked by pilasters and brackets supporting a triangular pediment in the first stage, a rounded headed window enclosed in an aedicula in the second stage, a blind third stage, and an oculus also enclosed in an aedicula in the fourth stage, all surmounted by a steep French-style roof with cresting. The two-bay sections on either side of the central tower are fenestrated by square headed windows with architraves on the ground floor, by round headed windows with keystones on the first floor and by single windows with segmental pediments at attic level. The outer bays, which are projected forward and gabled, are fenestrated by pairs of square headed windows with architraves on the ground floor, by Venetian windows on the first floor and by round headed windows enclosed in aediculae in the gables above.

Internally, the principal room is the council chamber which is 40 feet (12 m) long and 25 feet (7.6 m) wide. The arms of the former council in the pediment above the door feature a flaming torch, the crest of the Brandling family, which owned the local collieries.
