= Mouse Bird Snake Wolf =

2013 graphic novel by David Almond

- First edition
- Author: David Almond
- Illustrator: David McKean
- Language: English
- Genre: Children's fiction, fable
- Published: 2013 (Walker Books)
- Publication place: England
- Media type: Print (hardback)
- Pages: 80
- ISBN: 9781406322897
- OCLC: 900348795

Mouse Bird Snake Wolf is a 2013 graphic novel, written by David Almond and illustrated by David McKean. It is about three children who create animals from inanimate objects.

== Reception ==
A Guardian reviewer described it "a folktale or creation myth" and wrote, "There is a captivating simplicity about the unshowy language. By contrast the pictures are dramatic, striking, gorgeously lyrical."

Publishers Weekly, in a starred review, wrote, "First cousin to Philip Pullman’s imaginings, this contemporary fable about man's power to create and to destroy may be controversial in settings where questioning biblical creation stories is taboo, but where questioning is encouraged, it will challenge and provoke." A Kirkus Reviews called it "haunting .. Wild and alive".

Mouse Bird Snake Wolf has also been reviewed by Booklist, Library Media Connection magazine, The Horn Book Magazine, The School Library Journal, Reading Time, and The Bulletin of the Center for Children's Books.

== Awards ==
- 2014 Kate Greenaway Medal shortlist
- 2014 USBBY Outstanding International Book
