= Secret Heart (book) =

- First edition
- Author: David Almond
- Language: English
- Genre: Children's fiction
- Published: 2001 (Hodder Children's Books)
- Publication place: England
- Media type: Print (hardback)
- Pages: 201
- ISBN: 9780340764824
- OCLC: 925348762

Secret Heart is a 2001 story by David Almond. It is about a boy, Joe, and his involvement with a circus.

== Reception ==
A Booklist starred review of Secret Heart wrote "With echoes of Ray Bradbury and William Blake, Secret Heart is filled with scenes of breathtaking beauty, wonder, and astonishment. It is an unforgettable achievement." while the Horn Book wrote "Almond's undeniable gifts unfortunately run away with him in this overwrought, self-indulgent story".

The School Library Journal found "Though not as mysterious as his other titles, this book has thought-provoking allegory that will engage older readers in more and more layers of meaning."; and VOYA called it "a very different coming-of-age story."

Secret Heart has also been reviewed by Publishers Weekly, and Kirkus Reviews.
