= Skellig =

1998 children's novel by David Almond

- First edition
- Author: David Almond
- Cover artist: Fletcher Sibthorp
- Language: English and 30 more
- Genre: Children's fantasy novel, magic realism, fiction
- Publisher: Hodder Children's Books
- Publication date: 11 August 1998
- Publication place: United Kingdom
- Media type: Print (paperback)
- Pages: 176 pp (first edition)
- ISBN: 0-340-71600-2
- OCLC: 41320835
- LC Class: PZ7.A448 Sk 1999

Skellig is a children's novel by the British author David Almond, published by Hodder in 1998. It was the Whitbread Children's Book of the Year and it won the Carnegie Medal from the Library Association, recognising the year's outstanding children's book by a British author. In 2007, it placed third in the "Carnegie of Carnegies", after Northern Lights and Tom's Midnight Garden. In the U.S., it was a runner up for the Michael L. Printz Award, which recognises one work of young adult fiction annually. Since publication, it has also been adapted into a play, an opera, and a film. In December of 2011, a prequel, My Name is Mina was published. William Blake's poems feature in the book, the play and the film.

Delacorte Press published the first US edition in 1999.

== Plot ==
10-year-old Michael and his family have recently moved into a new house. He and his parents are nervous, as his new baby sister (who they have not named yet) was born earlier than expected and may not live because of a heart condition, and because they have to start over in a new home, which is not in the right condition to support and protect the baby. When Michael goes into the garage, he finds a strange emaciated man hidden amid all the boxes, debris and dead insects. Michael assumes that he is a homeless person, but decides to look after him and gives him food, despite all the warnings from this mysterious man and his parents. The man is crotchety and arthritic, demanding aspirin and Chinese food, but Michael helps him anyway. Michael then hears a story that human shoulder blades are a vestige of angel wings.

Meanwhile, his new friends from school become more and more distant as Michael stops attending school and spends less time with them in order to figure out more about the strange man. He meets a girl named Mina from across the road who intrigues him; Mina is home-schooled and enjoys nature, birds, drawing and the poems of William Blake. Often drawing or sculpting at home, she invites Michael to join in and the two become friends. She takes care of some baby birds who live in her garden and teaches Michael to hear their tiny sounds. Michael decides to introduce her to the strange man, who shows inhuman attributes and who the two begin to suspect is not human. Michael's friends, Leakey and Coot, become skeptical about Michael and try to find out what he is hiding from them. Michael and Mina try to keep it a secret from them, and have to move the creature, who is named "Skellig", to a safer space; Mina's old run-down home's attic.

Michael becomes intrigued with medical conditions like arthritis as his baby sister has been taken to the hospital for her heart condition, and frequently visits her as her condition worsens. The distant, winged Skellig, who remains grumpy and abrasive, begins to actually open up to Mina and Michael.

Michael's baby sister comes dangerously close to death, necessitating heart surgery. His mother goes to the hospital to stay with the baby and, that night, "dreams" of seeing Skellig come in, pick the baby up, and hold her high in the air, saving her. He subsequently moves from the garage after saying goodbye to Michael and Mina, answering their questions about his nature by saying that he is 'something' combining aspects of human, owl and angel.

The family decides to name Michael's baby sister since she will now live. After considering naming her after Persephone, a deity whom Mina admires, they settle on Joy because of the joy that her living will bring the family.

== Characters ==
- Michael (The main character)
- Mina (Michael's friend)
- Leakey (Michael's friend)
- Coot (Michael's friend)
- Skellig (Main character)
- Joy (Michael's baby sister)
- Whisper (Mina's cat)
- Mr. Stone (Real estate agent that sells Michael's family the house)
- Dr. Death (a.k.a. Dr. Dan, the doctor that comes to Michael's house to check up on the baby)
- Rasputin (Michael's science teacher)
- Dr. MacNabola (A cocky but friendly Dr who Michael talks to in order to find out more about arthritis)
- Mrs. Dando (A yard lady at Michael's school)
- Miss Clarts (Michael's English teacher)
- Mrs Moore (The school secretary of Michael's school)
- Ernie Myers (Former owner of the house)
- "Mum" (Michael's mother)
- "Dad" (Michael's father)
- Mrs. McKee (Mina's mother)

== Themes ==
Skellig is deliberately ambiguous about its title character who may represent an Imaginary friend but may also be a more literal guardian angel, or just a helpful ordinary human man mistaken for something nonhuman. Almond has provided public answers to some frequent questions from his school visits. The names "Skellig" and "Michael" are derived from the Skellig Islands off the coast of County Kerry, Ireland. One of them is Skellig Michael Island; St Michael is also the name of an archangel.

Almond has acknowledged the influence of "A Very Old Man with Enormous Wings", a short story by Gabriel García Márquez. Paul Latham compares the works in a research article, "Magical Realism and the Child Reader: The Case of David Almond's Skellig". Despite many similarities, he notes that Almond's child protagonists are much more caring and accepting than the closed-minded and sometimes cruel adults in the García Márquez story. Also, Mina and Michael keep Skellig a secret from the rest of human society. Thus the negative social commentary in Skellig, regarding medical institutions and other aspects of adult society, is not as harsh as in Márquez's story.

== Prequel ==
Hodder published Almond's 300-page prequel to Skellig late in 2010, My Name is Mina (ISBN 978-0-340-99725-3). It was one of four books on the 2011 Guardian Award shortlist and one of eight on the 2012 Carnegie shortlist. Both The Guardian and the Carnegie panel recommend Mina for readers age nine and up. According to children's book editor Julia Eccleshare, "Almond promotes and celebrates freedom for children and their thinking in this lyrical book about growing up."

Delacorte published the US edition in 2011. According to the summary, "Creative, intelligent, nine-year-old Mina keeps a journal in her own disorderly way that reveals how her mind is growing into something extraordinary, especially after she begins homeschooling under the direction of her widowed mother."

== Adaptations ==
=== 2003 play ===
Skellig was adapted into a play in 2003 directed by Trevor Nunn who thought it was important to follow the book's example of not revealing Skellig's exact nature, designed by John Napier. The original play was conceived from the novel to the play at The Young Vic Theatre, London. Cast included in alphabetical order; Ashley Artus, Noma Dumezweni, Akiya Henry, David Threlfall, Kevin Wathen, Mo Zinal. The play was later performed by Playbox Theatre Company in 2008. In March 2011 the play was performed at the New Victory Theater, New York by The Birmingham Stage Company who previously toured the UK with their production, from 2008 in London and Birmingham. The BSC founder and manager Neal Foster played Skellig.

=== 2008 opera ===
Skellig has been adapted into a contemporary opera with music by American composer Tod Machover and libretto by David Almond himself. The opera was staged at The Sage Gateshead from 4 November to 19 December 2008, with accompaniment by the Northern Sinfonia. The Opera starred Omar Ebrahim as Skellig with Sophie Daneman and Paul Keohone as Michael's parents.

=== 2009 film ===
Skellig, produced by Feel Films, was part of Sky 1's plan to invest £10 million in producing three new high-definition dramas. Filming started on 2 September 2008 in Caerphilly in Wales. The film stars Tim Roth in the title role, Bill Milner as Michael Cooper, Skye Bennett as Mina, and Kelly Macdonald and John Simm as Michael's parents (Louise 'Lou' and Steve Cooper). The film was written by Irena Brignull and directed by Annabel Jankel. The first showing of Skellig on Sky 1 was on 12 April 2009.

== See also ==
Awards
Preceded by River Boy	Carnegie Medal recipient 1998	Succeeded by Postcards from No Man's Land
