= Kit's Wilderness =

1999 children's novel by David Almond

- First edition (p/b)
- Author: David Almond
- Language: English
- Genre: Young adult novel
- Publisher: Hodder & Stoughton
- Publication date: Apr 1999
- Publication place: United Kingdom
- Media type: Print (hardcover & paperback)
- Pages: 233 pp (first edition)
- ISBN: 0340727160
- OCLC: 43342540
- LC Class: PZ7.A448 Ki 1999

Kit's Wilderness is a children's novel by David Almond, published by Hodder Children's Books in 1999. It is set in a fictional English town in the northeast of the country and is based on the former coal-mining towns the author knew as a child growing up in Tyne and Wear. It was silver runner-up for the Smarties Prize in the 9-11 ages category, highly commended for the Carnegie Medal, and shortlisted for the Guardian Children's Fiction Prize.

It was published in the United States by Delacorte Press in 2000 and won the Michael L. Printz Award from the American Library Association, recognising the year's best book for young adults.

== Synopsis ==
Thirteen-year-old Kit and his family have moved back to Stoneygate to be with his grandfather, who is succumbing to Alzheimer's disease, after Kit's grandmother dies. His grandfather, an ex-miner, tells him about the town's coal-mining days and the hardships and disasters that were a part of his youth. Kit meets Allie Keenan, full of energy and life, but also shadowy John Askew and the dangerous 'game' he plays – a game called Death. Through playing the game, Kit comes to see the lost children of the mines and begins to connect his grandfather's fading memories to his, his friends' and Stoneygate's history.

The Watsons are known as one of the "Old families" because they have ancestors who worked in the mines before they were closed, such as Kit's grandfather. Askew surrounds himself with characters that are from families who worked in the mines including Kit. Now that he is a part of Askew's group, Kit is invited to play the game Death, in which they reenact the death of children in the mines.

Once chosen for Death, Kit undergoes a change; snapping at Allie on multiple occasions. Noting this change, his teacher Miss Bush follows him and uncovers the game. Askew is expelled from school for being the leader. To escape his father, who is an alcoholic, Askew runs away and lives in an abandoned mine shafts. Angry at Kit for ending the game and getting him expelled, Askew sends Bobby Carr, another character from the "Old families" group, to bring Kit to the cave where they confront each other in the book's climax.

After some big arguments reveal Askew's madness at Kit, Kit then tells Askew about a story he "wrote for you[Askew]." The story mirrors Askew's life from the perspective of an early man named Lak, and while telling the story to him, they see ghosts from the story. When the tale concludes, the ghost takes a "part of me[Askew]" and he is no longer mad. Allie finds the two of them in the mine after getting their location from Bobby, and they go back to town. Askew is accepted back into school to take art classes, his father stops drinking, and at the end of the novel, Kit's grandfather dies. After he dies Kit decides to move on, knowing that his grandfather will be with him forever.

== Characters ==
- Christopher "Kit" Watson: Thirteen-year-old Christopher "Kit" Watson, the protagonist of the novel and enjoys writing stories. He is from one of the "Old families".
- John Askew: The antagonist, Thirteen-year-old Askew, is described by critics as "alluring and dangerous," befriending Christopher throughout the course of the novel. He is described as a skilled artist and is from one of the "Old families".
- Alison Keenan: Allison, or Allie, is a character that becomes friends with Christopher and has aspirations of being an actor. She is seen as a "temptress and protector," and described as a "bad-lass" by Christopher's Grandfather.
- Grandfather Watson: Grandfather Watson is an old man who lives and has worked in the town of Stoneygate. He worked in the coal mines before they were closed and is described by critics as the "wise one".
- Bobby Carr: Bobby Carr, acts as a bodyguard and messenger to Askew. He is suspicious of Christopher when he first joins their group and is used by Askew to fetch Christopher for their confrontation in a mine shaft.
- Mother and Father Watson: Christopher's parents play the role of caretakers for Grandfather Watson while he is ill.
- Miss Bush "Burning Bush": Miss Bush is a character who uncovers the game of Death, which gets Askew expelled, and assigns Christopher the story he ends up telling Askew in the mine.
- Father Askew: Askew's Father is an alcoholic who gets sober after Askew returns from running away.
- Mother Askew: Askew's mother is the character that raises Askew and his baby sister. When Askew runs away she asks Christopher to bring him back.
- Silky: The ethereal or imagined 'ghost boy' Kit Watson and his grandfather see in their dreams about the mine shafts.

== Background ==
Many of the elements from the story were taken from the author's own life. In an interview he talked about how, in the town he grew up in, "We had a monument... [and] an old graveyard...to a pit disaster" just like in the novel. He also based the game death on "children's games [he] played." In addition he "based the book on his own childhood in a northeast England mining community."

== Major themes and style ==
Kit's Wilderness explores themes of contrasts and significant relationships. The Horn Book Magazine noted several of these themes, including those of "light and dark, of life and death, [and] of remembering and forgetting." Reviewers noted the "bravery of children" as central to the narrative.

Kit's Wilderness uses uncommon literary style to add depth to the story. Enicia Fisher noted the "rare break from story-telling tradition, [in which] David Almond gives the ending away at the beginning." Fisher also pointed to the "web of stories" in the book that resulted from Kit's story within the story and the author's framing. He described the story as a blend of "magic and realism."

== Reception ==
Kit's Wilderness received both positive and negative reviews from mainstream critics. A review in Forecasts praised the novel as "awe inspiring." School Library Journal praised Kit's Wilderness for its "otherworldliness." Enicia Fisher described the internal storytelling as an "imagistic tale," though it has been said that reading the book requires a "suspension of disbelief." The structure of the book was also called "convoluted" by The Horn Book Magazine.
