= The Fire-Eaters =

2003 children's novel by David Almond

- First edition
- Author: David Almond
- Language: English
- Genre: Children's
- Publisher: Hodder Children's Books
- Publication date: 14 August 2003
- Publication place: United Kingdom
- Pages: 224 pp
- ISBN: 978-0-375-85751-5
- OCLC: 52324974

The Fire-Eaters is a 2003 children's novel by David Almond.

== Plot introduction ==
The novel is set in 1962, before and during the Cuban Missile Crisis.

Bobby Burns, who lives in the quiet coal-mining village of Keely Bay in Northumberland, has had a wonderful summer. But in autumn his father falls mysteriously ill, and he loathes his new school which is pervaded by bullying. Perhaps worst of all, Bobby is worried there will be a nuclear war.

Bobby's wonder-working friend Ailsa Spink and McNulty the crazy fire-eater open Bobby's eyes to the possibility of miracles.

== Main characters ==
- Robert 'Bobby' Burns
- Mum
- Dad
- Joseph Connor
- Ailsa Spink
- McNulty, a fire-eater
- Daniel Gower, a school friend of Bobby's
- Mr Todd
- Miss Bute

== Reception ==
Kirkus Reviews wrote "Like the choicest of Almond, this is moody and layered." and "Breathtakingly and memorably up to Almond’s best." while Publishers Weekly concluded that "Sensitive readers will marvel at Almond's ability to show, not tell, with his highly introspective—at times enigmatic—writing style."

== Awards and nominations ==
The Fire-Eaters won the Nestlé Smarties Book Prize Gold Award and the Whitbread Children's Book of the Year Award, as well as being shortlisted for both the Guardian Award and the Carnegie Medal.
