= Clay (novel) =

2005 novel by David Almond

- First edition (publ. Hodder)
- Author: David Almond
- Publisher: Hodder Children's Books
- Publication date: 1 January 2005
- ISBN: 978-0-340-77384-0

Clay is a 2005 children's/young adult novel by David Almond. It was shortlisted for the Carnegie Medal and longlisted for the Guardian Children's Fiction Prize.

The story, told in first-person, is about two boys, Davie and Stephen, who can make clay come to life. However, things quickly go downhill as the two become involved in a plot to rise a life-size sculpture they name "Clay". The story focuses on the nature of evil and creativity.

It was adapted for television in 2008 by Andrew Gunn, first aired on BBC One on 30 March 2008, and later rebroadcast another 9 times on BBC HD.

== Plot ==
14-year-old Davie and his friend, Geordie, are altar boys at their local Catholic church. They get into all kinds of mischief, such as stealing altar wine and fighting with a group from a rival school. One day, they spot a strange new boy named Stephen Rose, who has a passion for making sculptures, moving into his aunt "Crazy" Mary's house. Father O'Mahoney urges the two boys to befriend him, thinking they could be the friends Stephen needs to get over the trauma of losing both his parents. At first reluctant, believing Stephen to be doomed to insanity like the rest of his family, Davie grows closer to him and learns of a secret—Stephen can make his sculptures come to life. So can Davie, and Stephen wants his help to make a life-size man out of clay.

== Awards and honours ==
Awards for Clay
Year	Award	Result	Ref.
2005	Carnegie Medal	Shortlist	
2006	Costa Book Award for Children's Book	Shortlist	
2006	Guardian Children's Fiction Prize	Longlist	
2007	Best Books for Young Adults	Selection	
2007	Manchester Book Award	Longlist	
