= David Almond =

British children's writer (born 1951)

David Almond OBE FRSL
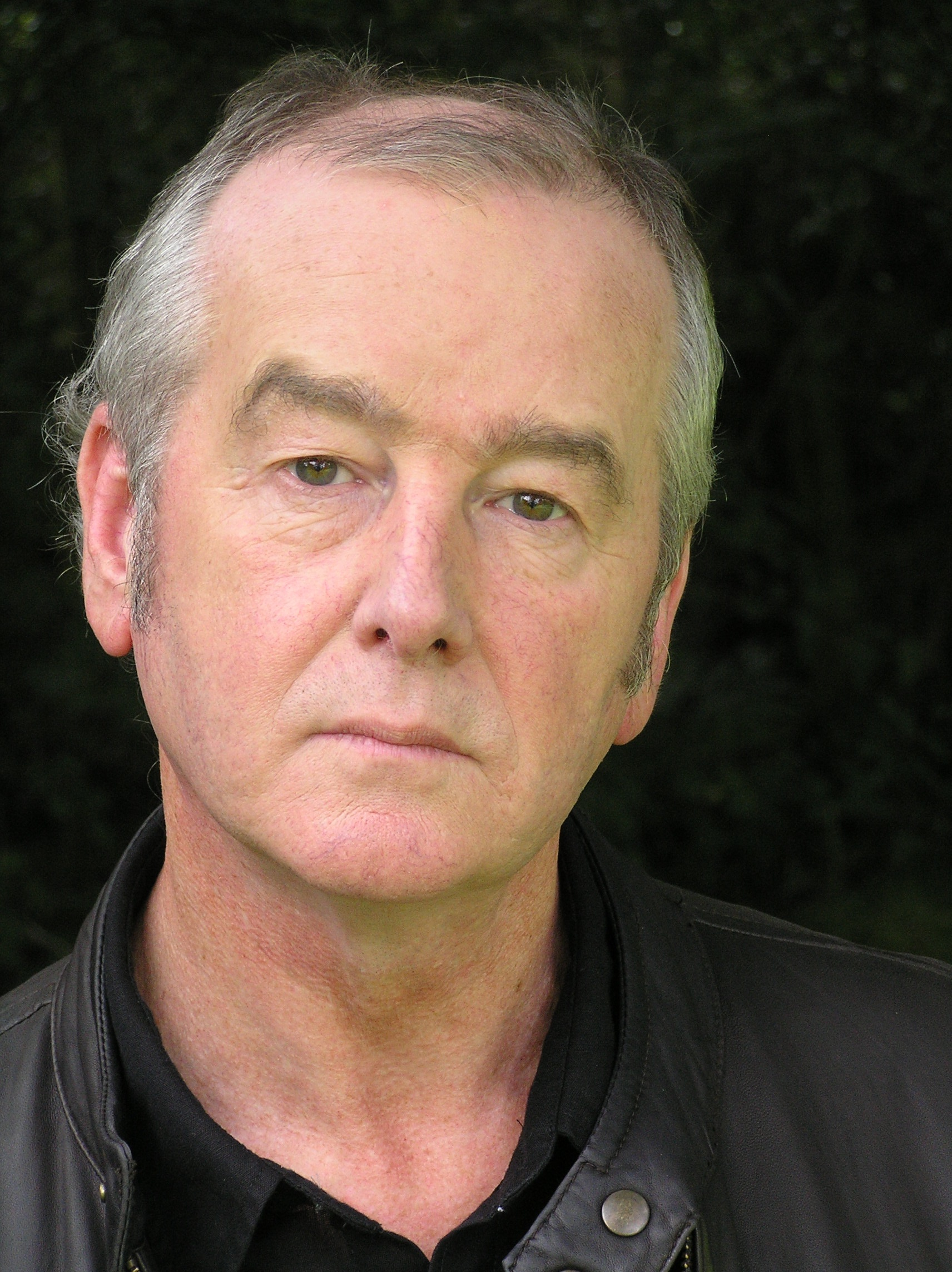
- Almond in 2008
- Born: 15 May 1951 (age 75); Newcastle upon Tyne, England
- Occupation: Writer
- Spouse: Julia Green
- Children: 1
- Writing career
- Period: 1998–present
- Genres: Children's novels, speculative fiction, magic realism
- Notable works: Skellig; Kit's Wilderness; The Fire-Eaters; Clay
- Notable awards: Carnegie Medal; 1998; Hans Christian Andersen Award for Writing; 2010; Eleanor Farjeon Award; 2015
- Website: davidalmond.com

David John Almond was born May 15, 1951, and is a British author who has written many novels for children and young adults from 1998, each one receiving critical acclaim.

He is one of thirty children's writers, and one of three from the UK, to win the biennial, international Hans Christian Andersen Award. For the 70th anniversary of the British Carnegie Medal in 2007, his debut novel Skellig (1998) was named one of the top ten Medal-winning works, selected by a panel to compose the ballot for a public election of the all-time favourite. It ranked third in the public vote from that shortlist.

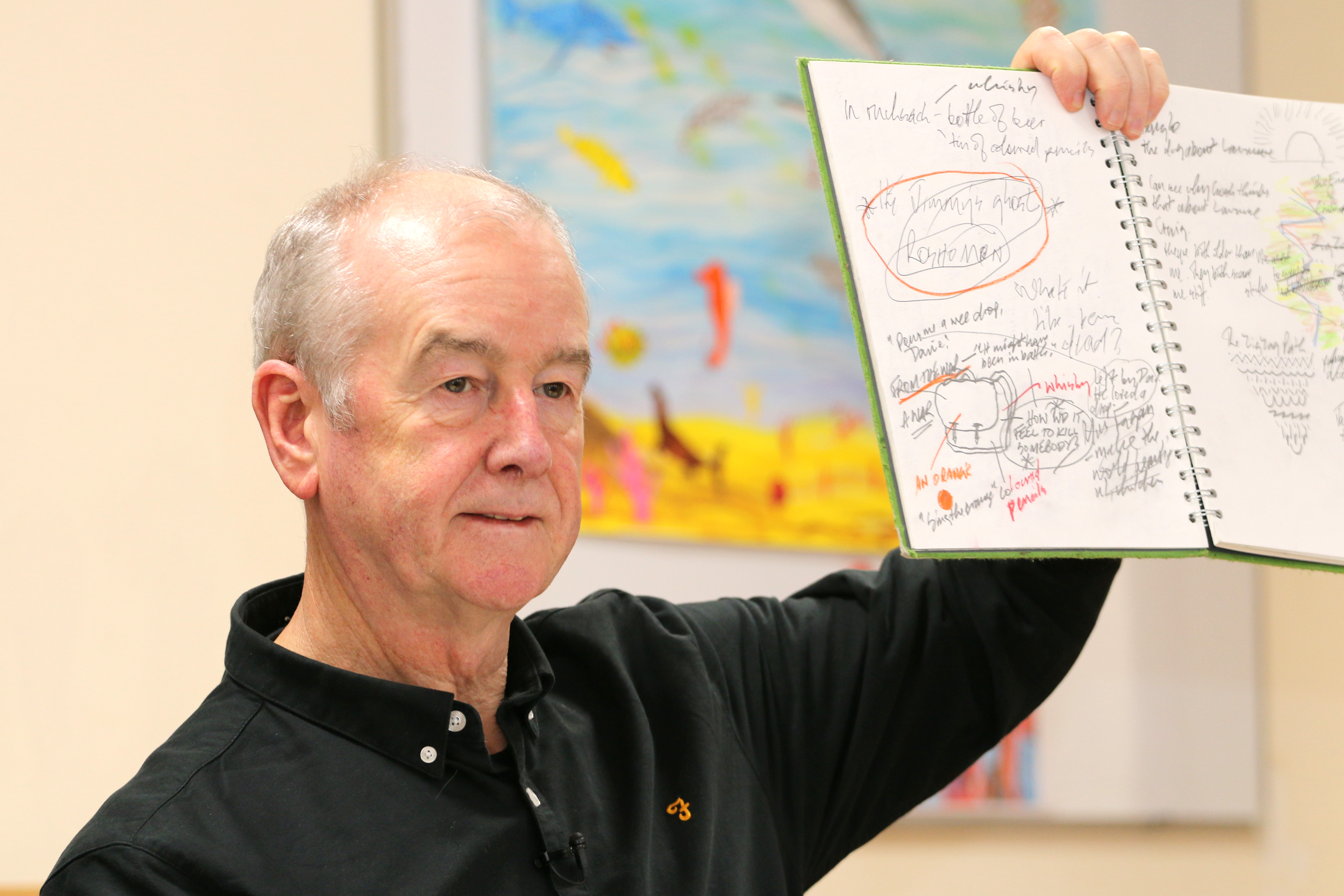
Almond at the meeting with readers at the Russian State Children's Library in Moscow

== Early life and education ==
Almond was born in Newcastle upon Tyne in 1951 and was raised in neighbouring Felling. His father was an office manager in an engineering factory and his mother was a shorthand typist. Almond was raised Catholic at St Joseph's Catholic Academy and had four sisters and one brother. As a child, he dreamed of becoming a writer and "wrote stories and stitched them into little books". He describes his childhood as one with "much joy" but also "much sadness", losing his younger sister and father at a young age.

He was educated at the University of East Anglia and Newcastle Polytechnic. After graduating, Almond worked as a teacher for five years; he then moved to an artists' commune in Norfolk and concentrated on his writing. He returned to Newcastle and worked as a part-time special-needs teacher while editing the literary journal Panurge.

== Career ==
Almond published his first collection of stories in 1985, Sleepless Nights. His second collection, A Kind of Heaven, appeared in 1987. He then wrote a series of stories that drew on his own childhood, and which would eventually be collected as Counting Stars, published by Hodder in 2000. In the next seven years, four more novels by Almond made the Carnegie Medal shortlist of five to eight books. Since Skellig, his novels, stories, and plays have also brought international success and widespread critical acclaim. They are Kit's Wilderness (1999), Heaven Eyes (2000), Secret Heart (2001), The Fire Eaters (2003), Clay (2005), Jackdaw Summer (2008), and My Name is Mina (2010), a prequel to Skellig. Almond collaborates with leading artists and illustrators, including Polly Dunbar (My Dad's a Birdman and The Boy Who Climbed Into the Moon); Stephen Lambert (Kate, the Cat and the Moon;) and Dave McKean (The Savage, Slog's Dad and the forthcoming Mouse Bird Snake Wolf). His plays include Wild Girl, Wild Boy, My Dad's a Birdman, Noah & the Fludd and the stage adaptations of Skellig and Heaven Eyes.

Almond's novel The True Tale of the Monster Billy Dean (2011) was published in two editions: Adult (Penguin Viking); and Young Adult (Puffin). His 2012 publications include The Boy Who Swam With Piranhas (illustrated by Oliver Jeffers). In 2013, Mouse Bird Snake Wolf (illustrated by Dave McKean) was published.

Almond's works are highly philosophical and thus appeal to children and adults alike. Recurring themes throughout include the complex relationships between apparent opposites (such as life and death, reality and fiction, past and future); forms of education; growing up and adapting to change; the nature of the "self". He won the Hans Christian Andersen Award for his writing, which biennially recognises the "lasting contribution" of one living author. (He had been one of five finalists in 2008.) The jury president, Ms Zohreh Ghaeni from Iran, observed that Almond "writes about children in crisis, while continuously giving hope to them", and cited, in particular, his first two novels, Skellig and Kit's Wilderness. She called "bibliotherapy" such as she attributed to Almond "a vital activity for all children around the world." When it named him a finalist months before, the international jury cited his "deeply philosophical novels that appeal to children and adults alike, and encourage readers by his use of magic realism". For his body of work, Almond was also a British nominee for the Astrid Lindgren Award at the same time. He is Professor of Creative Writing at Bath Spa University.

== Honours and awards ==
Almond's major awards include the Hans Christian Andersen Award, Carnegie Medal (Skellig); two Whitbread Awards; the U.S. Michael L. Printz Award for young-adult books (Kit's Wilderness); (Note: The American Library Association inaugurated its annual Printz Award for young-adult books with 1999 U.S. publications. Through 2012 no one has won two. With Skellig one of three inaugural runners-up and Kit's Wilderness the winner of the second Award (dated 2001), Almond is one of two writers with one Printz Medal and one "Honor Book".) the Smarties Prize, ages 9–11 years (The Fire-Eaters); the U.S. Boston Globe–Horn Book Award, Children's Fiction (The Fire-Eaters); the Guardian Children's Fiction Prize (A Song for Ella Grey); Le Prix Sorcieres (France); the Katholischer Kinder-und Jugendbuchpreis (Germany); and a Silver Pencil and three Silver Kisses (Netherlands).

The Skellig prequel, My Name is Mina (Hodder, 2010), was a finalist for three major annual awards: the Guardian Children's Fiction Prize, the Carnegie Medal, and the (German) Deutscher Jugendliteraturpreis. Almond was awarded the International Nonino Prize for 2022.

Almond was elected a Fellow of the Royal Society of Literature in 2011. He was appointed Officer of the Order of the British Empire (OBE) in the 2021 Birthday Honours for services to literature.

== Works ==
- Sleepless Nights (Cullercoats, Tyne and Wear: Iron Press, 1985), collection
- A Kind of Heaven (Iron Press, 1997), collection
- Skellig (Hodder Children's Books, 1998)
- Kit's Wilderness (Hodder, 1999)
- Counting Stars (Hodder, 2000), collection
- Heaven Eyes (Hodder, 2000)
- Secret Heart (Hodder, 2001)
- Where Your Wings Were (Hodder, March 2002), collection – World Book Day selection from Counting Stars, OCLC 48487565
- The Fire Eaters (Hodder, 2003)
- Clay (Hodder, 2005)
- My Dad's a Birdman, illus. Polly Dunbar (Walker Books, 2007)
- Jackdaw Summer (Hodder, 2008); US title, Raven Summer
- The Boy Who Climbed Into the Moon, illus. Dunbar (Walker, 2010)
- My Name is Mina (Hodder, 2010) – prequel to Skellig
- The True Tale of the Monster Billy Dean (Penguin, 2011)
- The Boy Who Swam With Piranhas, illus. Oliver Jeffers (Walker, 2012)
- Nesting (Iron Press, 2013), collection of Sleepless Nights, A Kind of Heaven, and two unpublished stories
- Mouse Bird Snake Wolf, illus. Dave McKean (Walker, 2013)
- A Song for Ella Grey (Hodder, 2014)
- The Tightrope Walkers (Penguin, 2014)
- Half a Creature from the Sea (Walker Books, 2016), collection
- The Tale of Angelino Brown (Walker Books, 2017)
- The Colour of the Sun (Hodder, 2018)
- War Is Over, illus. David Litchfield (Hodder, 2018)
- Brand New Boy, (Walker Books, 2020)
- Annie Lumsden, the Girl from the Sea, illus. Beatrice Alemagna (Candlewick Press, 2021)

Picture books and graphic novels

- Kate, the Cat and the Moon, illus. Stephen Lambert (2004)
- The Savage, illus. McKean (2008)
- Slog's Dad, illus. McKean (2009)
- The Dam, illus. Levi Pinfold (2018)
- The Woman Who Turned Children Into Birds, illus. Laura Carlin (Walker Books, 2022)

Plays

- Wild Girl, Wild Boy (2002)
- My Dad's a Birdman
- Noah & the Fludd
- Skellig (2002), adaptation of his novel
- Heaven Eyes, adaptation of his novel

== Personal life ==
Almond now lives in Newcastle upon Tyne. He has a child, Freya.

== See also ==
- Click, a work of collaborative fiction to which Almond contributed
