= School Librarian =

British magazine on children's books

School Librarian is a quarterly publication of the School Library Association (SLA) reviewing and discussing the latest children's books.

== History and profile ==
School Librarian was started in 1937. Each issue contains articles, regular features, reviews of new books -fiction and non-fiction- and reviews of apps, websites, and other media. Content often comes from outside sources, as journal publishers encourage writers to send in editorials, articles, and book and media reviews to the editors. Journal subscription comes at no cost to the members of the School Library Association; in addition, the SLA website archives each issue dating back to 2005.

== See also ==
- Books for Keeps
- School Library Journal
