= BookTrust =

United Kingdom children's reading charity

- Formation: 1921; 105 years ago
- Legal status: Independent charity
- Headquarters: Leeds, England
- Location(s): Leeds, London, Cardiff and Belfast
- Chief Executive: Diana Gerald
- Website: booktrust.org.uk

BookTrust is a UK children's reading charity dedicated to getting children reading.

The charity works across England, Wales and Northern Ireland – its head office is in Leeds, England.

BookTrust was founded in 1921 by Hugh Walpole, Stanley Unwin, Maurice Marston and Harold Macmillan.

The Queen is BookTrust's patron. In 2011, she took over the role from the Duke of Edinburgh who stood down after a number of years. BookTrust's president is Sir Michael Morpurgo, the award-winning author of over 120 books for children, including War Horse. The charity's chief executive is Diana Gerald, who took over from Viv Bird in early 2015.

== History ==
In 1921, BookTrust (formerly the Society of Bookmen) was founded by authors Hugh Walpole and John Galsworthy, publishers Stanley Unwin and Maurice Marston and politician Harold Macmillan.

At one of the society's early meetings in 1924, it was proposed that a National Book Council should be formed; the first meeting of the newly formed National Book Council took place in Eastbourne on 11 September 1924.

In 1969, BookTrust's then Chief Executive, Martyn Goff, secured funding from the Arts Council. This allowed the charity to move in new directions. Ultimately this paved the way for BookTrust to manage several established literary prizes, including the Baileys Women's Prize for Fiction (formerly The Orange Prize for Fiction) and the Sunday Times Short Story Award. The charity now focuses on books for children and one of its current prizes is the Blue Peter Book Awards.

In a bid to demonstrate and champion the benefits of reading from a young age, Bookstart was created in 1992 by the charity in partnership with libraries and health visitors.

== Bookstart ==
Bookstart is BookTrust's early years programme. Every child in England and Wales gets a free Bookstart pack before they are 12 months old and again aged 3–4 years (27 months in Wales). There are also black-and-white booklets for newborns and dual language books.

The pilot for the programme was initiated in Birmingham in 1992 and involved 300 babies. BookTrust commissioned Professor Barry Wade and Dr Maggie Moore to both promote and research the Bookstart project. The project built on previous research which identified the significance of reading with very young children.

The research found that Bookstart children began school with significant advantages and with higher attainment in all aspects of the nine pre-school baseline assessments. By 1999, many local authorities were eager to participate in the Bookstart programme and by March 2000, 92% of local authorities had joined the programme. The success of the Bookstart programmes was helped by library staff willing to become "Bookstart Coordinators".

Bookstart offers book packs for children with additional needs, these include:

- Bookshine for children who are deaf
- Booktouch for children who are blind or partially sighted
- Bookstart Star for children with conditions affecting their fine motor skills

== Bookgifting programmes ==
As well as Bookstart, BookTrust also runs the following programmes and campaigns that give out books, resources and support to children:

- Time to Read: Time to Read packs give a free book to every Reception-aged child in England, when they are four or five years old.
- Pori Drwy Stori: Pori Drwy Stori is funded by the Welsh Government and aims to support children's literacy in Reception-aged classes. Pori Drwy Stori is a dual-language programme.
- Bookbuzz: Bookbuzz offers every student in Year 7 or 8 the chance to choose their own book from a list of titles for children aged 11–13, regardless of their reading ability or learning age. The books are selected by a panel of experts.
- The School Library Pack: School Library Pack is a free offering of books and resources to schools in England with Year 7 (or equivalent) students. The programme is funded by Arts Council England.
- Letterbox Club: Letterbox Club is run in partnership with the University of Leicester. The Letterbox Club pack consists of books, activities and stationery that is provided to children aged 3 to 13 years old in foster families. Children are enrolled by local authorities and schools.
- Spark: Spark is a programme for special schools designed to inspire a love of stories and books in children with additional needs.

== Prizes ==
- Booktrust Early Years Award: Originally called the Sainsbury's Baby Book Award(s), was a set of annual literary prizes for children's picture books that from 1999 to 2004 was sponsored by the supermarket chain Sainsbury's. The last Awards year was 2010.
- Blue Peter Book Awards: The Blue Peter Book Awards is run in collaboration with CBBC's Blue Peter. The award has recognised authors and illustrators.
- Waterstones Children's Laureate: The role of Children's Laureate is awarded once every two years to an eminent writer or illustrator of children's books. The Laureate must have a substantial body of work; previous Children's Laureates include Michael Morpurgo, Julia Donaldson and Malorie Blackman. Cressida Cowell, author of the How to Train Your Dragon books, is the current Children's Laureate.
- Lifetime Achievement Award: The BookTrust Lifetime Achievement Award is given to a children's writer or illustrator whose body of work merits recognition for a lifetime's achievement in children's literature. It was set up in 2015. In 2019, Meg and Mog illustrator Jan Pieńkowski was awarded the prize. In 2021, John Agard became the first poet to receive the award.
- Sainsbury's Children's Book Awards: In partnership with BookTrust, this prize highlights the best children's books for families to share together. The 2019 Book of the Year was My Pet Star by Corrinne Averiss.
- Storytime Prize: This prize was set up in 2019 and celebrates and promotes the best books for sharing and repeat reading with young children. The first book to win the prize is Cyril and Pat by Emily Gravett.

== Projects and campaigns ==
- BookTrust Represents: is a programme created to promote and improve the representation of people of colour in children's books so that all children read a range of books that reflect them and their wider communities. In early 2019, BookTrust in collaboration with University College London, conducted research on the representation of people of colour among children's book authors and illustrators. It found that less than 2 per cent of published authors and illustrators in the UK are British people of colour. Since 2019 BookTrust Represents has reached over 45,640 children across England with free books and school author events, working with some of the UK's leading authors and illustrators of colour in children's literature and bringing them into the classroom, virtually and in-person.
- Pyjamarama: Pyjamarama is an annual fundraising campaign in England that began in 2019. Primary schools, nurseries, libraries and other settings are encouraged to spend a day in pyjamas reading and sharing stories and rhymes to get more children reading and raise money for BookTrust.

== Other ==
On Friday 17 December 2010 it was announced that the government would cut its entire £13 million annual grant to BookTrust's English bookgifting schemes. The schemes, including Bookstart, Booktime and Booked Up, provided more than two million packs of books to English children annually. After a public campaign by authors including Philip Pullman and Andrew Motion, the government announced it would negotiate with BookTrust on renewal of the funding. BookTrust continues to be supported using public funding by Arts Council England.
