= Arkham Asylum =

Fictional psychiatric hospital in DC Comics

Elizabeth Arkham Asylum for the Criminally Insane
- Arkham Asylum in Batman (vol. 3) #9 (December 2016). Art by Mikel Janín.
- First appearance: Batman #258 (October 1974)
- Created by: Dennis O'Neil (writer); Irv Novick (artist)
- Genre: Superhero

In-universe information
- Other names: Arkham Asylum; Arkham State Hospital; Arkham Home for the Emotionally Troubled; Arkham Manor; Elizabeth Arkham Asylum for the Criminally Insane
- Type: Forensic psychiatric hospital
- Locations: Gotham City
- Characters: Most of Batman's adversaries Hugo Strange; Jeremiah Arkham; Amadeus Arkham; Aaron Cash
- Publisher: DC Comics

Arkham Asylum (/ˈɑːrkəm/) is a fictional psychiatric hospital appearing in American comic books published by DC Comics, commonly in stories featuring Batman. It first appeared in Batman #258 (October 1974), written by Dennis O'Neil with art by Irv Novick. Located in Gotham City, the asylum houses patients who are criminally insane, as well as select prisoners with unusual medical requirements that are beyond a conventional prison's ability to accommodate. Its high-profile patients are often members of Batman's rogues gallery.

== History ==
Located in Gotham City, Arkham Asylum is where Batman's foes who are considered mentally ill are brought as patients (other foes are incarcerated at Blackgate Penitentiary). Although it has had numerous administrators, some comic books have featured Jeremiah Arkham. Inspired by the works of H. P. Lovecraft, and in particular his fictional city of Arkham, Massachusetts, the asylum was introduced by Dennis O'Neil and Irv Novick and first appeared in Batman #258 (October 1974); much of its history was established by Len Wein during the 1980s.

Arkham Asylum has a poor security record and high recidivism rate, at least with regard to the high-profile cases—patients, such as the Joker, are frequently shown escaping at will—and those who are considered to no longer be mentally unwell and discharged tend to re-offend. Several of its staff are corrupt or insane.

Originally, Arkham Asylum was used only to house genuinely mentally ill patients having no connection to Batman, but over the course of the 1980s, a trend was established in having the majority of Batman's adversaries end up at Arkham. Gotham criminals deemed "criminally insane" or "mentally unfit" by the court of law are sometimes treated at Williams Medical Center before being deemed dangerous enough to be sent to Arkham Asylum.

== Origins ==
Arkham Asylum in Detective Comics (vol. 2) #14 (January 2013). Art by Jason Fabok.

Serving as a Gotham City psychiatric hospital, Arkham Asylum has a long and brutal history, beginning when its own architect became mentally unwell and hacked his workers to death with an axe. He was convicted and sentenced to spend the rest of his life in the same asylum he had been building. The one-shot graphic novel Arkham Asylum: A Serious House on Serious Earth establishes that the asylum was named after Elizabeth Arkham, the mother of founder Amadeus Arkham. The original name of the asylum was "Arkham Hospital". Its dark history began in the early 1900s when Arkham's mother, having suffered from mental illness most of her life, committed suicide. However, it was later revealed that her son had actually euthanized her and repressed the memory. As the sole heir to the Arkham estate, Amadeus decided to remodel his family home to properly treat the mentally ill, so others might not suffer the same fate as his mother.

Prior to the period of the hospital's remodeling, Amadeus Arkham treated patients at the State Psychiatric Hospital in Metropolis, where he, his wife Constance and his daughter Harriet had been living for quite some time. Upon his telling his family of his plans, they moved back to his family home to oversee the remodeling. While there, Amadeus Arkham received a call from the police notifying him that Martin Hawkins, a serial killer, had escaped from prison and sought his considered opinion on the murderer's state of mind. Shortly afterward, Amadeus Arkham returned to his home to find his front door wide open. Inside, he discovered the raped and mutilated corpses of his wife and daughter in an upstairs room, with Mad Dog's alias carved on Harriet's body. Despite this family tragedy, the Elizabeth Arkham Asylum for the Criminally Insane officially opened that November.

With his sanity in tatters, Amadeus designed a floor plan that evoked occult runes, believing that the pattern would drive away the mysterious bat that haunted his dreams. One of its first patients was Mad Dog, whom Amadeus Arkham insisted on treating personally. After treating Mad Dog for six months, Amadeus strapped him to an electroshock couch, then deliberately and purposefully electrocuted him. The staff treated the death as an accident, but it contributed to Amadeus's gradual descent into mental illness, which he began to believe was his birthright. In 1929, Amadeus was taken into a patient in his own asylum after he tried to kill his stockbroker; Amadeus ultimately died while in prison.

== Publication history ==
Arkham Hospital in Batman #258 (October 1974). Art by Irv Novick.

Arkham Asylum first appeared in October 1974 in Batman #258, written by Dennis O'Neil and drawn by Irv Novick. In this story, it is named as "Arkham Hospital", although it is not clear what kind of hospital it is. "Arkham Asylum" first appeared in another O'Neil story the following year, but it was not until 1979 that "Arkham Asylum" completely replaced "Arkham Hospital", and the occasional "Arkham Sanitarium", as the institution's name. Also in 1979, the move to have the asylum closer to Gotham had begun; that was completed in 1980, when Batman #326 by Len Wein described the asylum's location "deep in the suburbs of Gotham City".

Arkham Asylum has been demolished or destroyed several times in its history, notably during the events of Batman: The Last Arkham (see below). It is also seriously damaged at the beginning of the Knightfall storyline, when Bane uses stolen munitions to blow up the facility and release all the patients. After these events, the asylum is relocated to a large mansion known as "Mercey Mansion". At the beginning of the No Man's Land storyline, the asylum is closed down and all its patients discharged.

In the Battle for the Cowl one-shot, Dr. Jeremiah Arkham wanders among the remains of the asylum as he muses on his life. He reveals that he has discovered blueprints created by his uncle, Amadeus Arkham, for a new Arkham Asylum. He also contemplates the fates of his own nonviolent "special" patients: an artist with almost no facial features who must paint facial expressions onto his almost blank face to express himself; a man obsessed with his own reflection in a series of mirrors in his room; and a woman supposedly so ugly, one glance at her face would cause anyone to become mentally ill. Upon discovering his "special" patients (unharmed from the destruction thanks to their secluded cells), Arkham resolves to rebuild the facility according to his ancestor's vision, but to serve as a literal asylum for mentally ill patients in order to shelter them from the outside world. However, when told to be happy with the new development, the artist secretly paints his face white with a hideous grin, reminiscent of the Joker; it is implied that the "special" patients, as well as Arkham himself, have given in to mental illness.

In the Arkham Reborn miniseries, Arkham Asylum is rebuilt and financed by Dr. Arkham. But in Batman #697, Arkham is revealed to be the new Black Mask and is a patient in his own asylum. It was also revealed during Arkham Reborn, that as both Arkham and Black Mask, he had begun to manipulate patients, a plotline that culminated in Detective Comics with Alyce Sinner becoming the new head of the facility, but secretly working with Arkham/Black Mask. It was also revealed that the "special" patients were figments of Arkham's imagination.

During Batman Eternal, Arkham Asylum is destroyed as part of the villains' assault on Batman, with Bruce Wayne also being declared bankrupt after Wayne Enterprises loses most of its assets following Hush detonating some of Batman's hidden weapons caches around the city. As a result, Wayne Manor is repossessed by the city and turned into the new Arkham Asylum, but Bruce decides to accept the situation on the grounds that he can now keep a closer eye on his foes in the asylum due to his intimate knowledge of the manor's entrances and exits (after sealing off the entrance to the Batcave from the manor).

In Batman #258, it is named as Arkham Hospital, although it is not clear what kind of hospital it is. Arkham Asylum first appeared in another Dennis O'Neil story the following year, but it was not until 1979 that Arkham Asylum completely replaced Arkham Hospital, and the occasional Arkham Sanitarium, as the institution's name.

== Staff ==
=== Wardens ===
- Dr. Amadeus Arkham – The founder of the asylum, Amadeus named the institution after his deceased mother Elizabeth.
- Dr. Jeremiah Arkham – The nephew of Amadeus Arkham. Jeremiah was the head of the asylum until he became mentally unwell and assumed the mantle of Black Mask.
- Quincy Sharp – Sharp is the warden of Arkham Asylum in the Batman: Arkham series. He possesses a murderous split personality and devoted himself to "curing" Gotham City.
- Dr. Hugo Strange – A psychiatrist who later came to Gotham City after deducing the true identity of Batman. He later became chief psychiatrist of Arkham.

=== Corrections officers ===
- Aaron Cash – One of Arkham's most respected security guards. His hand was bitten off by Killer Croc and he sports a prosthetic hook in its place. Unlike many of his colleagues, Cash is neither mentally unwell nor corrupt and is a trusted ally of Batman.
- Frank Boles – A security guard who patrolled near the cell of Solomon Grundy. He was killed by the Emerald Empress.
- Lyle Bolton – A former decorated Arkham guard who was so ruthless in how he handled inmates that he was later fired and became Lock-Up to continue his agenda.

=== Psychiatrists ===
- Dr. Achilles Milo – He became the administrator of Arkham Asylum for a time and tried to drive Batman mad after putting him into a straitjacket. He was later exposed to chemicals that drove him insane.
- Dr. Alyce Sinner – Chosen by Jeremiah Arkham as his second-in-command and briefly committed under Arkham's orders. Sinner became head of the asylum after Arkham was revealed as Black Mask. She is secretly a member of Intergang working with Black Mask.
- Dr. Anne Carver – She was a psychiatrist who was murdered by Jane Doe. She stole her identity and took her role and hoped to extort Warren White out of millions and steal his identity.
- Dr. Ant Carley – He was a psychiatrist who was known for his dangerous testing with LSD and trying to get the patients to open their third eye. Carley was fired after a week due to his test being seen as unsafe.
- Harleen Quinzel – A former psychiatric intern who was seduced by the Joker and became his sidekick, Harley Quinn.
- Joan Leland – Harleen's therapist and former colleague. She was created for Batman: The Animated Series.
- Jonathan Crane – A former psychologist who performed fear-inducing experiments on his patients before becoming the supervillain Scarecrow.
- Dr. Ruth Adams – She was taken hostage after the patients of the facility, led by the Joker, took over in an attempt to get Batman to come to the Asylum. She attempted to cure Two-Face of his inability to make choices on his own by introducing him to other objects such as a six-sided die, and a tarot deck.

== Graphic novels featuring Arkham Asylum ==
=== Arkham Asylum: A Serious House on Serious Earth ===
Arkham Asylum: A Serious House on Serious Earth is a graphic novel written by Grant Morrison and painted by Dave McKean. It was published by DC in 1989. It made reference to the treatment of several of the patients, such as the attempt to wean Two-Face away from dependence on his coin for decision making, first with a die and then a deck of cards. It once again portrays the asylum as having been taken over by its patients.

A Serious House on Serious Earth has been critically acclaimed, having been called "one of the finest superhero books to ever grace a bookshelf." IGN ranked it as number four in a list of the 25 greatest Batman graphic novels, behind The Killing Joke, The Dark Knight Returns, and Year One, whilst Forbidden Planet named it number eight in their "50 Best of the Best Graphic Novels" list.

Batman's rogues at Arkham Asylum. Cover art of Batman: Shadow of the Bat #81 (September 1998 DC Comics). Art by Glen Orbik.

=== Batman: The Last Arkham ===
Batman: The Last Arkham was written by Alan Grant; pencils by Norm Breyfogle, originally a four-issue storyline that kicked off the Batman: Shadow of the Bat series. In it, the old Arkham Asylum is destroyed, to be replaced by a new and more modern facility. The story introduces Jeremiah Arkham, the asylum's director and nephew of Amadeus Arkham. In an attempt to discover how criminals, specifically Zsasz, keep escaping, Batman has himself committed to the asylum. Jeremiah uses various methods, such as unleashing many patients on Batman at once, in an attempt to gain psychological insight on the vigilante.

This story makes a few passing references to the events of A Serious House on Serious Earth, such as Amadeus Arkham taping over the mirror, and his journal is shown early in the story. Jeremiah also mentions his relative's descent into mental illness.

=== Arkham Asylum: Living Hell ===
Arkham Asylum: Living Hell was written by Dan Slott, penciled by Ryan Sook with inks by Sook, Wade Von Grawbadger and Jim Royal. The series was edited by Valerie D'Orazio. Eric Powell created the painted cover art which appeared on both the original series and graphic novel compilation.

This six-issue miniseries and the subsequent trade paperback provided an intricate and multi-layered look at Arkham Asylum from several points of view: director Jeremiah Arkham; psychiatrist Dr. Anne Carver; the guards, chiefly Aaron Cash; and the patients. There is a particular focus on previously unknown residents: Jane Doe, a cypher who assumes the identities of those she kills; Junkyard Dog, a man obsessed with trash; Doodlebug, an artist who uses blood in his paintings; the hulking bruiser Lunkhead; Death Rattle, a cult leader who speaks to the dead; and Humpty Dumpty, a savant obsessed with taking apart and repairing various objects. The driving force is the recent admission of a ruthless investor, Warren White, as well as the demonic element suggested by the title. White, facing charges of massive fraud, pleads insanity to avoid being sent to prison, knowing he can bribe a Gotham jury. The judge sees through White's attempt to avoid prison and has White admitted to Arkham, which White himself had never even heard of up until that point. He soon realizes the horrors of the place and tries to survive. Ultimately, White is locked in Mr. Freeze's cell and loses his nose and his lips to frostbite. The demonic threat is nullified after the sacrifice of several patients, thanks to the joint effort of Etrigan the Demon and White tricking the demons into sending themselves back to the Underworld.

=== Black Orchid ===
Black Orchid, written by Neil Gaiman and illustrated by Dave McKean, also featured Arkham Asylum. The award-winning graphic novel introduced an updated version of the crimefighter Black Orchid, who dies, is reborn and starts a quest to find her identity. During this she encounters Batman, who directs her to Arkham Asylum, where she meets the Mad Hatter, Poison Ivy, Two-Face and the Joker. Arkham is viewed as a desperate place where patients dwell in terror, much in the same fashion as in A Serious House on Serious Earth, which was also illustrated by McKean.

=== Arkham Reborn ===
Arkham Reborn is a three-part miniseries written by David Hine and illustrated by Jeremy Haun. It tells the story of the rebuilding of the Asylum after having been destroyed by Black Mask during the events of "Battle for the Cowl".

In Batman #697, it is revealed that Dr. Jeremiah Arkham is the new Black Mask. More is revealed about Dr. Jeremiah Arkham in Detective Comics #864 and #865.

=== Batman: The Man Who Laughs ===
The Man Who Laughs is a one-shot prestige format comic book written by Ed Brubaker and illustrated by Doug Mahnke and Patrick Zircher, released in February 2005. The comic reveals some of the asylum's dark history. As a reporter reports on the asylum's renovation, the Joker poisons her and the crew, stealing the news van to broadcast whenever he wants. He later releases criminally insane patients at Williams Medical Center, who, in a short number of weeks, would have been transferred to Arkham Asylum. In the end, Joker is defeated and he himself is locked behind bars, in a straitjacket at Arkham.

The graphic novel was reprinted with Detective Comics #784-786–a storyline entitled "Made of Wood," also written by Brubaker with art by Zircher. In the storyline, Batman and Green Lantern track the "Made of Wood" serial killer, whose killing spree was cut short when he was admitted to Arkham Asylum. Ex-Commissioner James Gordon is also pursuing the killer and he narrows the search down to the two men admitted to Arkham in December 1948, the only living one hardly able to walk and ignorant of the killings. Gordon reaches the grandson of the other, who has taken up the "Made of Wood" killer's mantle.

== Other versions ==
- An alternate future version of Arkham Asylum appears in The Dark Knight Returns.
- Arkham Asylum appears in JLA: The Nail, where it is destroyed during a battle between Batman and the Joker.
- Arkham Asylum appears in Batman: Crimson Mist, where a vampiric Batman kills most of its inmates.

== In other media ==
=== Television ===
==== Live-action ====
- Arkham Asylum appears in Birds of Prey.
- Arkham Asylum appears in Gotham.
- Arkham Asylum appears in television series set in the Arrowverse.
- Arkham Asylum appears in Titans.
- Arkham Asylum appears in The Sandman. This version is located in Buffalo, New York.
- Arkham Asylum appears in The Penguin.

==== Animation ====
Arkham Asylum as it appeared on Batman: The Animated Series and The New Batman Adventures

The alternate Arkham Asylum as it appeared in Justice League

- Arkham Asylum appears in the DC Animated Universe series Batman: The Animated Series. An alternate universe version of the Arkham Asylum overseen by the Justice Lords appears in the Justice League episode "A Better World".
- Arkham Asylum appears in The Batman (2004).
- Arkham Asylum appears in the Batman: The Brave and the Bold episode "Mayhem of the Music Meister!".
- Arkham Asylum appears in Harley Quinn.
- Arkham Asylum appears in the Scooby-Doo and Guess Who? episode "What a Night, For a Dark Knight!".
- Arkham Asylum appears in the DC Super Hero Girls episode "#NightmareInGotham".

=== Films ===
==== Live-action ====
- Arkham Asylum appears in Batman Forever and Batman & Robin.
- Arkham Asylum appears in Batman Begins, portrayed by the National Institute for Medical Research.
- Arkham Asylum appears in films set in the DC Extended Universe (DCEU).
- Arkham Asylum, renamed Arkham State Hospital, appears in Joker and Joker: Folie à Deux.
- Arkham Asylum appears in The Batman (2022).

==== Animation ====
- Arkham Asylum appears in Batman Beyond: Return of the Joker.
- Arkham Asylum appears in the Batman: Gotham Knight segment "Crossfire".
- Arkham Asylum appears in Batman: Assault on Arkham.
- Arkham Asylum appears in the Batman: Unlimited film series.
- Arkham Asylum appears in The Lego Batman Movie.
- Arkham Asylum appears in Scooby-Doo! & Batman: The Brave and the Bold.
- Arkham Asylum appears in Batman vs. Teenage Mutant Ninja Turtles.
- Arkham Asylum appears in Justice League vs. the Fatal Five.

=== Video games ===
- Arkham Asylum appears as a stage in the Batman Forever tie-in game.
- Arkham Asylum appears in Batman: Toxic Chill.
- Arkham Asylum appears in Batman: Rise of Sin Tzu.
- Arkham Asylum appears in Batman: Dark Tomorrow.
- Arkham Asylum appears in the Batman Begins tie-in game.
- Arkham Asylum appears in DC Universe Online.
- Arkham Asylum appears in the Lego Batman series and Lego DC Super-Villains.
- Arkham Asylum appears in the Batman: Arkham series. This version is an island-based prison akin to Alcatraz. After Arkham is badly damaged during the events of the first game, its prisoners are moved to the mainland and placed in Arkham City, a massive prison-city.
- Arkham Asylum appears as a stage in the Injustice series.
- Arkham Asylum appears in Batman: The Telltale Series.
- Arkham Asylum appears in Gotham Knights. This version is a mansion that was later converted into a hospital. Years prior to the game's events, Arkham was condemned due to structural integrity flaws and its inmates were transferred to Blackgate Penitentiary.

== See also ==
- Blackgate Penitentiary – A similar correctional facility in Gotham City, used to contain non-metahuman supervillains such as crime lords.
- Iron Heights Penitentiary – A maximum-security prison in the DC Universe akin to Arkham.
- Stryker's Island – Another penitentiary in the DC Universe similar to Arkham located in Metropolis
- Ravencroft – A similar institute for the mentally insane used to house various supervillains in the Marvel Universe, typically appearing in stories associated with the character Spider-Man.
