= The Tragical Comedy or Comical Tragedy of Mr. Punch =

1994 graphic novel by Neil Gaiman and Dave McKean

- Cover art by Dave McKean
- Date: 1994
- Page count: 96 pages
- Publisher: Gollancz; Vertigo; Bloomsbury Publishing

Creative team
- Writer: Neil Gaiman
- Artist: Dave McKean
- ISBN: 0575053186

The Tragical Comedy or Comical Tragedy of Mr. Punch, or simply Mr. Punch, is a graphic novel written by Neil Gaiman, illustrated and designed by Dave McKean. It was published in 1994.

== Synopsis ==
The book, which takes place mostly in Portsmouth, follows the childhood memories of the narrator, illustrating various experiences in his life: fishing on the beach at dawn; his grandparents and how one grandfather went mad; a hunchback great-uncle; the betrayal of children by adults; fear of the unknown; an unwanted pregnancy, violence, possibly even murder.

The general story is paralleled with the traditional story of the Punch and Judy show, "The oldest, the wisest play". The narrator is first introduced to Mr. Punch when fishing with his grandfather, but encounters it, and a mysterious "professor" (Punch & Judy man), during various other activities. The story of Mr. Punch is that he kills his baby, then his wife Judy, and the police officer who comes to arrest him. He outwits a ghost, a crocodile, and a doctor, convinces the hangman to be hanged in his place, and, at the play's end, even defeats the devil himself.

== Publications ==
It has been published a number of times:

- UK 1994, Gollancz, paperback, ISBN 0-575-05318-6, hardback, ISBN 0-575-05141-8
- USA 1995, Vertigo, paperback, ISBN 1-56389-246-4, hardback, ISBN 1-56389-181-6
- 2006, Bloomsbury Publishing, paperback, ISBN 0-7475-8844-9
- 2017, Urban Comics, hardback, ISBN 979-10-268-1118-3

== Adaptations ==
Future Bible Heroes wrote and performed a song about the character, called "Mr. Punch". It was released on the compilation album Where's Neil When You Need Him?, which also featured Tori Amos, Aurelio Voltaire, and Rasputina.

In 2005, BBC Radio 3 broadcast a one-hour radio adaptation of The Tragical Comedy or Comical Tragedy of Mr. Punch, adapted by Gaiman with music by McKean and Ashley Slater.

The Rogue Artists Ensemble also have mounted Mr. Punch as a stage play.

== See also ==
- The Tragical Comedy or Comical Tragedy of Punch and Judy: "set down in 1828 by John Payne Collier, now edited with an introduction by Paul McPharlin and illustrated with collotype reproductions of the original etchings by George Cruikshank and of twenty-four sketches in color by Mr. Cruikshank never before printed". New York: Limited Editions Club, 1937.
- Violent Cases, an earlier work by Gaiman and McKean.
