= Batman: Arkham Asylum =

2009 video game

- Developer: Rocksteady Studios (Note: Ported to PlayStation 4 and Xbox One by Virtuos and Nintendo Switch by Turn Me Up Games)
- Publishers: Eidos Interactive; Warner Bros. Interactive Entertainment
- Director: Sefton Hill
- Producers: Daniel Bailie; Nathan Burlow
- Programmer: Ben Wyatt
- Artist: David Hego
- Writer: Paul Dini
- Composers: Nick Arundel; Ron Fish
- Series: Batman: Arkham
- Engine: Unreal Engine 3 (Note: Unreal Engine 4 was used for the PlayStation 4 and Xbox One version.)
- Platforms: PlayStation 3; Xbox 360; Windows; Mac OS X; PlayStation 4; Xbox One; Nintendo Switch
- Release: August 25, 2009: PlayStation 3, Xbox 360; NA: August 25, 2009; EU: August 28, 2009; AU: September 3, 2009 Windows; NA: September 15, 2009; PAL: September 18, 2009 Mac OS X; WW: November 3, 2011 PlayStation 4, Xbox One; WW: October 18, 2016; Nintendo Switch; WW: December 1, 2023
- Genre: Action-adventure
- Mode: Single-player

Batman: Arkham Asylum is a 2009 action-adventure game developed by Rocksteady Studios and published by Eidos Interactive in conjunction with Warner Bros. Interactive Entertainment. Based on the DC Comics superhero Batman and written by veteran Batman writer Paul Dini, Arkham Asylum was inspired by the long-running comic book mythos. In the game's main storyline, Batman battles his archenemy, the Joker, who instigates an elaborate plot to seize control of Arkham Asylum, trap Batman inside with many of his incarcerated foes, and threaten Gotham City with hidden bombs.

The game is presented from the third-person perspective with a primary focus on Batman's combat and stealth abilities, detective skills, and gadgets that can be used in combat and exploration. Batman can freely move around the Arkham Asylum facility, interacting with characters and undertaking missions, and unlocking new areas by progressing through the main story or obtaining new equipment. The player is able to deviate away from the main story to unlock additional content and collectible items. Combat focuses on chaining attacks together against numerous foes while avoiding damage, while stealth allows Batman to conceal himself around an area, using gadgets and the environment to silently eliminate enemies.

Development began at Rocksteady Studios in May 2007, with a 40-person team that expanded to 60 people by the project's conclusion after approximately 21 months. Among other sources, the game design was inspired by the Batman comics of Neal Adams and Frank Miller, as well as Grant Morrison and Dave McKean's graphic novel Arkham Asylum: A Serious House on Serious Earth. Built on Unreal Engine 3, Arkham Asylum's production underwent several variations, refining both gameplay such as the combat system, and the central story, resulting in the removal of plot elements and some of Batman's main enemies, who did not fit the tone of the rest of the game. Rocksteady began developing ideas for a sequel months before Arkham Asylum's completion, hiding hints to the sequel within the game.

Arkham Asylum was released worldwide for PlayStation 3 and Xbox 360 video game consoles in August 2009, followed by a Windows version. The game received critical acclaim, particularly for its narrative, atmosphere and combat, though some criticism was directed at its boss fights. Upon release, many reviewers called it the "greatest comic book game of all time." It won several awards, including Best Action Adventure game, Best Game, and Game of the Year from various media outlets, and it held the Guinness World Record for "Most Critically Acclaimed Superhero Game Ever". It has been cited as one of the greatest video games ever made. The game received a "Game of the Year Edition" in 2010, and a remastered version for the PlayStation 4 and Xbox One in 2016. A version for the Nintendo Switch was released in 2023.

Arkham Asylum's success launched the Batman: Arkham series, comprising video game sequels and spin-offs, comic books, merchandise, and an animated film, beginning in 2011 with the game's narrative sequel Arkham City.

== Gameplay ==
Batman: Arkham Asylum is an action-adventure game viewed from the third-person perspective. The playable character is visible on the screen and the camera can be freely rotated around him. The player controls Batman as he traverses Arkham Asylum, a secure facility for the criminally insane located off the coast of Gotham City. The opening areas of the game are linear, serving as a tutorial for the moves and approaches available to the player. Once the player emerges onto the island they can freely explore the game world, although some areas remain inaccessible until certain milestones in the main story. Batman can run, jump, climb, crouch, glide from heights using his cape, and use his grapple gun to climb low structures or escape to higher ledges.

Batman uses "Detective Vision" to solve puzzles and track enemies throughout the game. Enemies with firearms are identified by red x-ray images.

The player can use "Detective Vision"—a visual mode which provides contextual information, tinting the game world blue and highlighting interactive objects like destructible walls and removable grates, the number of enemies in an area and their status—such as their awareness of Batman's presence—and shows civilians and corpses. The mode is also used to follow footprints, investigate odors, and solve puzzles.

Batman has access to several gadgets which he can use to explore or fight. The batarang is a throwing weapon that can temporarily stun enemies or trigger remote devices. A remotely controlled version can be steered once thrown, and the sonic batarang can be used to attract the attention of specific enemies wearing monitoring collars, or detonated to knock a nearby enemy unconscious. Explosive gel can be used on weak walls and floors, and can be remotely detonated—sending rubble crashing onto an enemy. The line launcher can be used to traverse horizontal spans. The Batclaw—a grappling device—can be used to interact with remote objects such as vent covers or to grab enemies. The Cryptographic Sequencer is used to override security panels, open new paths, or disable various asylum functions. Some areas are inaccessible until Batman acquires the gadgets necessary to overcoming the obstacle. The player is encouraged to explore the game world away from the main game to find and solve riddles left by the Riddler—who hacks into Batman's communication system to challenge him with riddles. Objects can be collected, and some of the Riddler's puzzles require the player to find areas related to the answer to a riddle and scan it with "Detective Vision". The game world has 240 collectable items, such as Riddler trophies, chattering Joker teeth, interview tapes with some of Arkham's inmates, and cryptic messages left in the asylum by its founder Amadeus Arkham that discuss the facility's sinister history. The player is rewarded for solving riddles and finding collectibles with experience points and additional game content, including challenge maps that test the player's skill at the game's combat system, character biographies, and in-game statues of Arkham Asylum's characters.

Players can traverse enemy-controlled areas using stealth or direct combat. The game's "Freeflow" combat uses three main buttons: attack, stun, and counter. The system lets Batman move quickly between enemies, chaining attacks together until all enemies are unconscious. Combining the three main abilities can keep Batman attacking while moving between enemies and avoiding being attacked himself. The more combo attacks that are chained together, the faster and more agile Batman becomes, and special attacks—such as a throw, grapple, and an instant takedown which can immediately defeat an enemy—become available. Combat is rewarded with experience points, which are used to unlock gadgets, combat moves, and health upgrades. Higher combos, a wider variety of moves, and avoiding damage delivers more points. Enemy attacks are preempted with a warning icon, which indicate the attack can be countered. Some enemies require different approaches to overcome; knife-wielding thugs must be stunned before they can be attacked, and others must be struck from behind. Some enemies are armed with guns which significantly damage Batman. Enemies react to Batman's elimination of their allies, which raises their fear level and alters their behavior; for example, they will adopt new patrol routes, requiring the player to adapt to the changing situation. During combat, Batman's health is diminished by attacks, but is fully restored once the battle ends.

The player can use predatory tactics through stealth—including silent takedowns, dropping from overhead perches and snatching enemies away, or using the explosive gel to knock foes off their feet—to tilt the odds in their favor. Some areas feature sections that require the player to use these tactics to avoid alerting the Joker's henchmen and thus failing to meet an objective. Many areas feature stone gargoyles placed high above, helping Batman remain concealed. Batman can use his grapnel gun to reach the gargoyles, giving him a high vantage point over the area and the enemies. From the gargoyles, Batman can glide down to attack enemies or hang upside down from the gargoyles to grapple a nearby enemy and leave him tethered there. The player can use floor grates to attack from below, hide around corners, use batarangs to stun enemies from afar, and use the grapnel gun to pull enemies over ledges.

Arkham Asylum features a series of challenge maps separate from the game's story mode that are unlocked while playing, and others are available as optional downloadable content (DLC). The maps focus on the completion of specific goals, such as eliminating successive waves of enemies in combat, and subduing patrolling enemies while using stealth. The methods and variety of abilities used to achieve these goals earn an overall performance score that is ranked online against other players. On the PlayStation 3, the Joker is a playable character in the combat and stealth challenge maps via optional DLC; he must confront the asylum guards and police commissioner James Gordon. The Joker has his own combat abilities and weapons, such as a handgun, exploding chattering teeth, and x-ray glasses which allow him to see opponents through walls.

On compatible systems, the Microsoft Windows version uses nVidia's PhysX software engine to produce realistic, dynamic interactions with the game world. With PhysX enabled, some areas contain smoke or fog which reacts to Batman moving through it, while with PhysX disabled the fog will not appear at all. Other effects include dynamic interaction with paper and leaves, surfaces which can be scratched and chipped, and dynamic, destructible cloth elements such as banners and cobwebs. The "Game of the Year Edition" features the ability to play the game in 3D on any 2D television using anaglyph 3D glasses.

== Synopsis ==
=== Characters ===
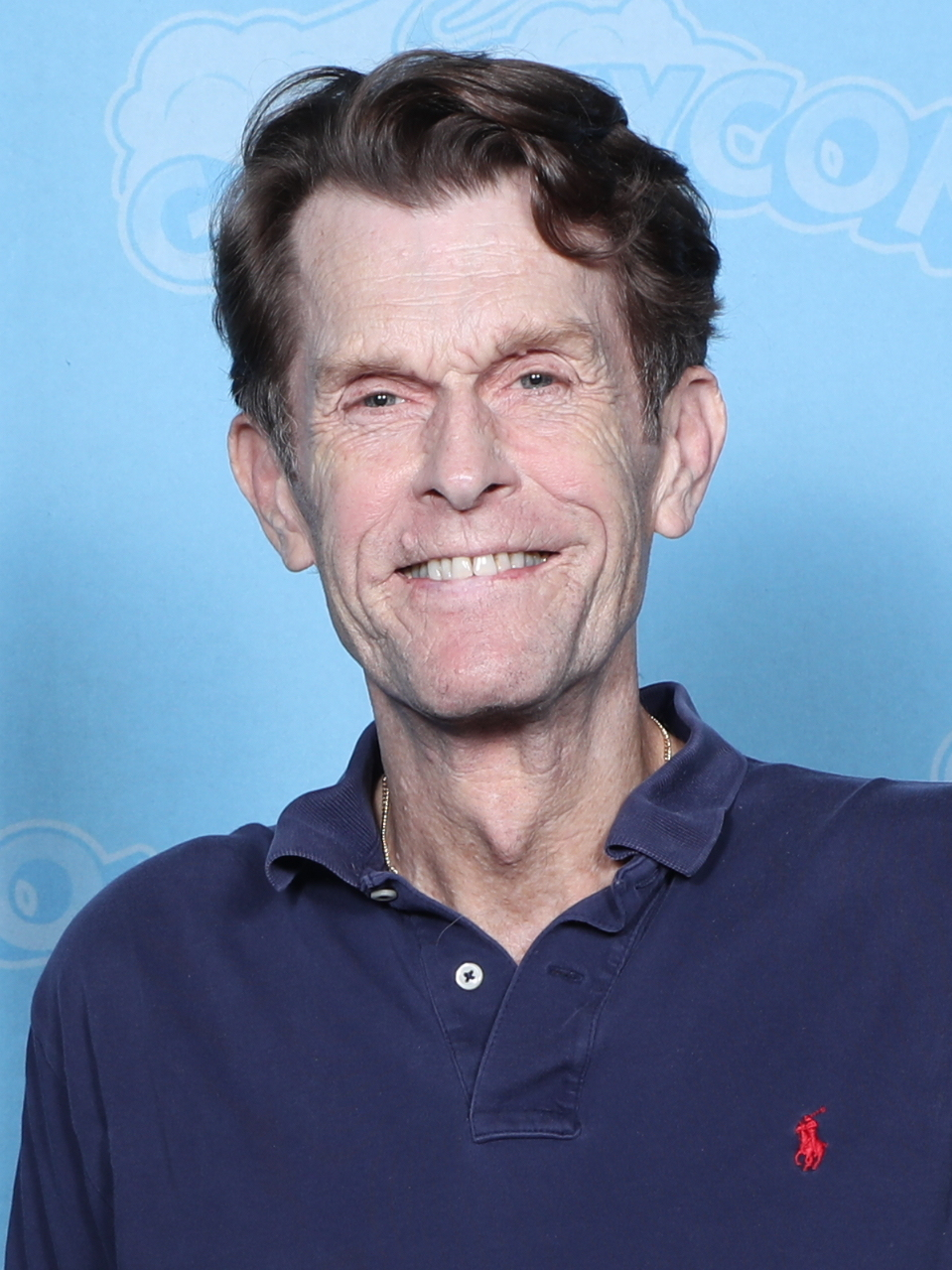
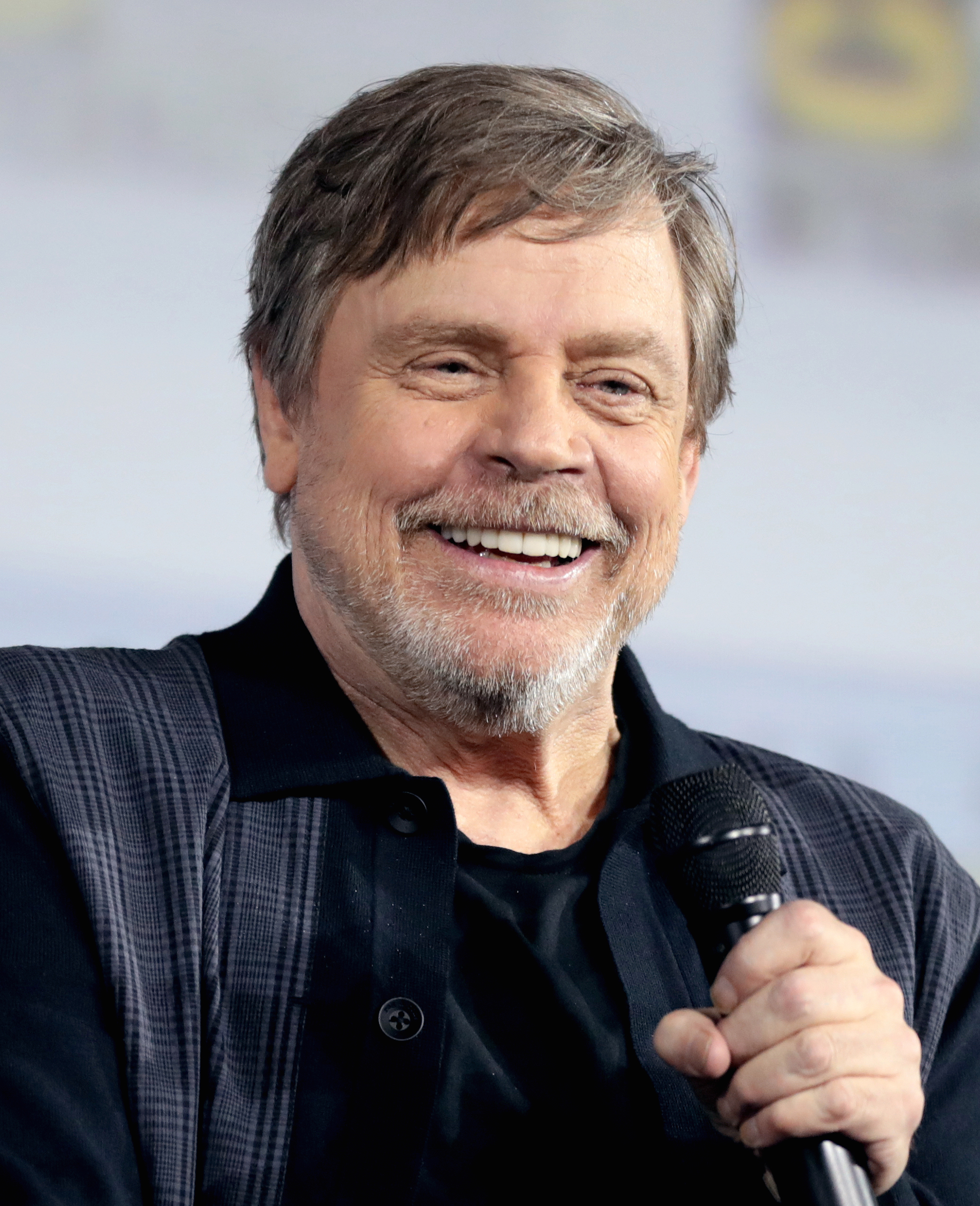
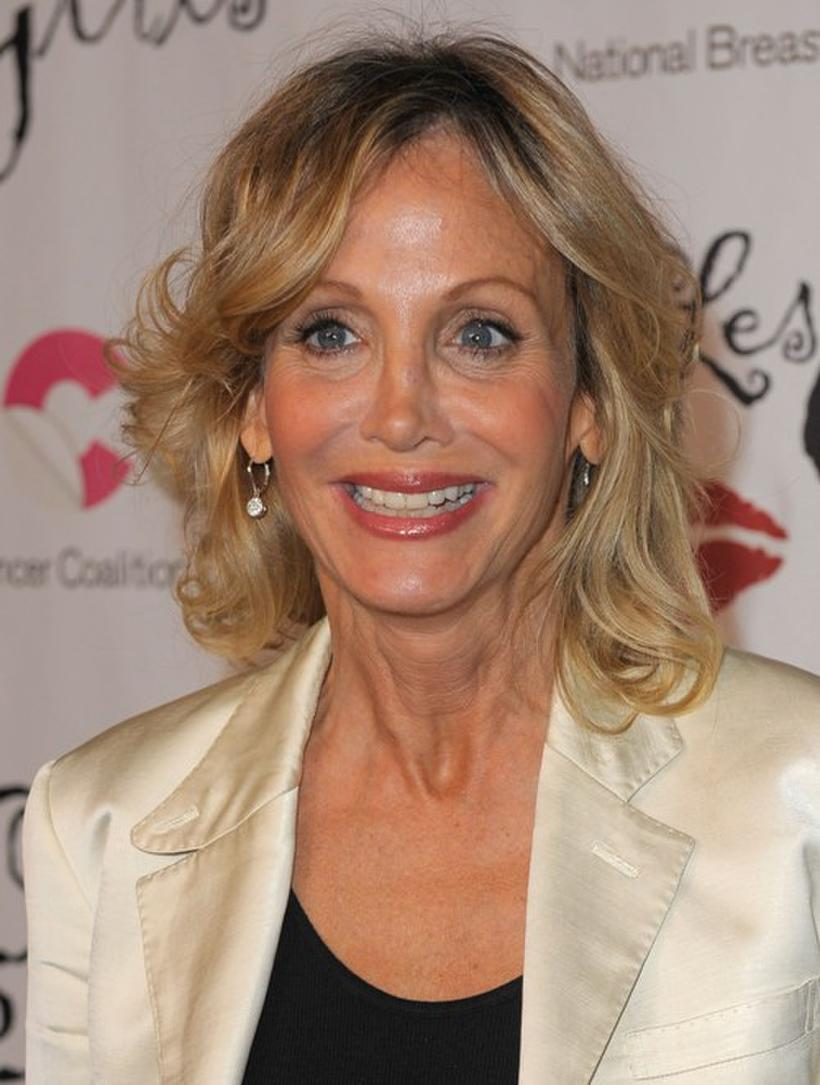
Kevin Conroy, Mark Hamill, and Arleen Sorkin reprised their roles as Batman, Joker, and Harley Quinn from Batman: The Animated Series and its spin-offs.

Arkham Asylum is set in the fictional Arkham Asylum, a facility on Arkham Island off the coast of Gotham City that houses criminally insane supervillains. The game features a large ensemble of characters from the history of Batman comics. Three voice actors who worked on the DC Animated Universe series of film and television reprised their roles for the game. Kevin Conroy voices Batman—a superhero trained to the peak of human physical perfection and an expert in martial arts, Mark Hamill voices Batman's psychopathic nemesis the Joker, and the Joker's sidekick Harley Quinn is voiced by Arleen Sorkin. Batman is aided by his allies Oracle (Kimberly Brooks)—who remotely provides him with intelligence, and police commissioner James Gordon (Tom Kane).

In the asylum, Batman is faced with several supervillains; he must defend himself from an enraged Bane (Fred Tatasciore), subdue indiscriminate serial killer Victor Zsasz (Danny Jacobs), confront the monstrous Killer Croc (Steve Blum), defeat the plant-controlling Poison Ivy (Tasia Valenza), and battle his way through hallucinogen-induced nightmares created by the Scarecrow (Dino Andrade). The Riddler (Wally Wingert) does not physically appear in the game, but communicates with Batman and challenges him to solve riddles placed around the island. Other characters appearing in the game include the asylum's warden Quincy Sharp (also voiced by Kane), Batman's parents Thomas and Martha Wayne (voiced by Conroy and Valenza respectively), and asylum guard Aaron Cash (Duane R Shepard, Sr). The shape-shifting Clayface appears in cameo, taking on the guise of other characters as he tries to trick the player into releasing him. The Mad Hatter was almost included in the game, but the developers removed him. The body of Ra's al Ghul is in the asylum's morgue and the Ventriloquist's dummy, Scarface, appears several times throughout the story. Several other characters—including the Penguin, Jack Ryder, Mr. Freeze, Two-Face, Catwoman, and the asylum's founder Amadeus Arkham—are referenced in the game, but do not appear in it.

=== Plot ===
After the Joker assaults Gotham City Hall, he is caught by Batman and taken to Arkham Asylum, which temporarily houses many members of the Joker's gang, who were transferred after a fire at Blackgate Prison. Believing Joker allowed himself to be captured, Batman accompanies him into the asylum. The Joker's plan is revealed as Harley Quinn takes over the security and Joker escapes into the facility, aided by Frank Boles, a corrupt guard who kidnaps Commissioner Gordon. Joker threatens to detonate bombs hidden around Gotham City if anyone tries to enter Arkham, forcing Batman to work alone. Tracking Quinn to the medical facility to rescue Gordon, Batman is exposed to the Scarecrow's fear toxin. After fighting off Scarecrow's hallucinations, Batman finds and subdues Quinn before rescuing Gordon. Joker then directs Batman to the captured Bane, who has been experimented on by asylum doctor Penelope Young. Joker frees Bane to fight Batman, who defeats him by ramming him into the ocean with the Batmobile, during which Quinn escapes. Afterward, he goes to a secret Batcave installation he had hidden on the island, where he restocks his gadgets.

There, Batman learns that Joker returned to the asylum to gain access to Young, who has been developing Titan—a more powerful version of the Venom drug that gives Bane his strength—intending to use it to help patients survive more strenuous therapies. Young learned that Joker had been secretly funding her research to create an army of indestructible and savage superhuman monsters; her refusal to hand over the formula precipitated Joker's return to the asylum. While searching for Young, Batman destroys her Titan formula before rescuing her from Victor Zsasz. A bomb kills Young, and Joker steals the completed batches of Titan.

At the penitentiary, Quinn releases Poison Ivy from her cell before being imprisoned by Batman. Quinn accidentally reveals that Joker has a Titan production facility in the Arkham Botanical Gardens. Batman travels there and learns that Titan is created by genetically modified plants. He learns from Ivy that the spores required to create an antidote are found exclusively in Killer Croc's lair in a sewer. Afterward, Joker injects Ivy with Titan, enhancing her powers, and she begins to ravage Arkham Island with giant mutant plants. En route to Croc, Batman reencounters Scarecrow and pursues him into the sewers. Scarecrow is attacked by Croc and dragged underwater. Batman recovers the necessary spores and subdues Croc before returning to the Batcave. However, he can only synthesize one dose of the antidote before Ivy's plants breach the cave and destroy his equipment.

Batman returns to the botanical gardens and defeats Ivy, halting the rampaging plants. Joker announces that the preparations for his party are finally complete, and Batman travels to the asylum's visitor center to confront him. The Joker reveals he has recaptured Gordon and tries to shoot him with a Titan-filled dart; Batman leaps to Gordon's defense and is shot instead. Batman attempts to resist the change, and an upset Joker takes an overdose of Titan, mutating into a monster. In a makeshift arena on the building's roof, Joker challenges Batman to a fight against Titan-induced monsters in front of news helicopters. Batman refuses to transform, uses the antidote on himself, and defeats the Titan-affected Joker and his henchmen. In the aftermath, those affected by Titan begin to revert to normal, including Joker—who is taken into custody as police officers retake control of the asylum. Batman overhears a call about a crime led by Two-Face in progress and flies back to Gotham City in the Batwing. In a post-credits scene, a crate of Titan formula is shown floating in the ocean near the asylum when a hand surfaces and grabs it.

== Development ==
Batman: Arkham Asylum was first announced in August 2008; it was developed by British studio Rocksteady Studios under the aegis of Eidos Interactive and Warner Bros. Interactive Entertainment. Eidos obtained the rights to make a Batman game in spring 2007, and approached then little-known Rocksteady after viewing the developer's prototype. At Eidos' request, Rocksteady presented their approach to the Batman license, and by May 2007, they had begun developing the game's concept, with full production beginning in September. Writer Paul Dini (Batman: The Animated Series, Detective Comics) was first approached by DC Comics around late 2007 about the prospect of creating a story for an original Batman video game. Dini found the idea intriguing, believing that few Batman games were based on an original idea, instead being adapted from film or television. DC Comics asked Dini what his approach to writing a new Batman film or graphic novel would be, but one that was designed for gameplay. He later met with the Rocksteady team, where it was decided that Dini's ideas were in line with what Rocksteady wanted to achieve. By the time Dini joined the project, Rocksteady were investigating the idea of setting the game within Arkham, and had produced preliminary designs depicting it as a huge estate on an island connected to mainland Gotham City by a bridge. The cast had not been finalized, but given the setting it was certain that the Joker would play a large role. The game and story were developed together, with the limitations of mechanics requiring the story to be built around them. The core aim was to make the game engaging enough for players to spend 8–10 hours completing it, especially those uninterested in Batman-franchised media. Rocksteady would guide Dini when they thought he was writing too much story or character motivation.

Among various Neal Adams and Frank Miller-penned Batman stories, Grant Morrison's Arkham Asylum: A Serious House on Serious Earth was an inspiration for the game's design. Producer Nathan Burlow said the narrative and atmosphere of the 2007 game BioShock influenced Arkham Asylum's design. Director Sefton Hill said the influences of the gadgets and abilities that can be combined and used in different ways came from The Legend of Zelda and Metroid. The design team isolated the components that they felt made Batman, and exaggerated these elements. Design ideas which contradicted these facets of the character were dropped, and other elements of Batman, such as his refusal to kill his enemies, were strictly enforced, which provided additional challenges in allowing the player to have complete freedom in the game without transgressing on that fundamental aspect of the character. Arkham Asylum was chosen as the setting because it confined the player to an area containing several enemies, whereas in an open city setting he could receive help, return to the Batcave, or otherwise be able to distance himself from his opponents.

The development team wanted to include iconic aspects of the Batman mythos, and decided early on in production to have Conroy, Hamill, and Sorkin reprise their roles in Dini's Batman: The Animated Series as Batman, the Joker, and Harley Quinn, respectively. Hamill has thousands of lines of dialogue in the game, and Conroy has relatively few in comparison. After seeing character models of the Joker's Arkham Asylum appearance, Hamill decided to portray the character as dark and gritty while retaining a clownish and playful nature. Although the game features references to plot events in both The Animated Series and Batman comics, the story does not directly follow any singular story or depiction of the character.

The game took approximately 21 months to complete; Rocksteady began development with a team of 40, which had expanded to around 60 by the game's completion. Combat was considered one of the greatest challenges in developing the game; the system went through three iterations. Rocksteady originally developed the game's combat as a full rhythm action game. It was later set in 2D, which involved colored circles crashing into each other during fights; the final system was based on this 2D model. Combat was designed to be unique for Batman, and was given a simple control scheme to reflect the ease with which Batman can perform the moves. Arkham Asylum was built on Epic Games' Unreal Engine 3. Eidos president Ian Livingstone said one developer spent two years working on Batman's cape, using over 700 animations and sound effects to make it move realistically.

The developers intended to use other Batman characters in the game, but these were removed when it was decided they would not work within the story. For example, Batman's enemy Mr. Freeze did not fit because the character has different motivations to the Joker. Unlike the Riddler, who is obsessed with proving his superiority over Batman, Mr. Freeze does not hold a personal grudge against Batman, and Mr. Freeze would not care about the other villains' plans. A garden maze under Poison Ivy's control was considered as a location; she could grow it in different directions. In its center, Batman would find the Mad Hatter hosting a tea-party, but the developers decided these ideas would not match the game's tone. Batman's vehicles, the Batmobile and Batwing, were considered for inclusion in the game, but developing unique control mechanics and gameplay segments for them would have taken too much time, and compromised its quality; the vehicles appear in the game, but players cannot control them.

Rocksteady began conceiving ideas for a possible sequel, which became Batman: Arkham City, approximately seven months before development of Arkham Asylum was completed. Rocksteady developed ideas for the sequel's story and setting so the games' narratives could be effectively connected. A secret room containing hints, blueprints, and concept art for the next game was hidden in the asylum warden's office in Arkham Asylum. The room remained hidden for six months following the game's release until Rocksteady revealed its presence. Arkham Asylum's musical score was composed by Ron Fish and Nick Arundel, who also composed the soundtrack for the sequel, Batman: Arkham City.

=== Design ===
To develop the game's overall aesthetic, the main aim was to create designs that would combine comic book style with realism. The environmental architecture and characters had to be extravagant enough to represent the Batman universe, but needed realistic texture and detail. The second aim was to recreate the dark, Gothic imagery inherent to the Batman universe, especially Arkham Asylum, so that the structure would feel as insane as those whom it houses. The asylum was considered an ideal location because it can house many of Batman's foes.

Batman's design was heavily influenced by the work of comic artist Jim Lee, who drew Batman as a strong, muscular character who could believably take part in extreme combat. His black and dark gray costume was based on modern versions, and has military influences and an industrial look. Approximately thirteen concept designs were produced before his final appearance took form. Artists avoided film interpretations of the Joker, partly because the developers only had access to the rights to the original Batman license. Alan Moore's 1988 graphic novel Batman: The Killing Joke influenced the character's design. Harley Quinn underwent a drastic redesign, removing her black and red full-body outfit and jester's hat, and replacing them with a costume with design elements from a nurse's outfit and a schoolgirl's uniform. WildStorm, Lee's comic book publishing company, produced concept art for the game.

Designs for the asylum departed from comic interpretations of a large mansion and instead developed an entire island, with hints of Alcatraz prison, composed of multiple buildings to allow for greater variety and exploration. Each building was designed with a different architectural style to make the facility appear believable and to imbue each location with a history. The medical building was inspired by Victorian architecture and its metalwork structure was intended to inspire feelings of horror. The intensive treatment unit has a Gothic, industrial aesthetic. The catacombs beneath the facility, inspired by early twentieth-century brickwork and Victorian industry, were meant to feel oppressive. The maximum security area was designed to feel claustrophobic and was retrofitted like a bunker, and the Arkham mansion displays a High Gothic style. The designers integrated crooked lines into environmental objects, such as trees and drainpipes, where possible. 40 rooms, 34 corridors, three exterior areas, and three Scarecrow-induced hallucination areas were designed for the game.

To bring these areas to life, the level designers produced game mechanic elements using simple room layouts and shapes, while concept artists worked in tandem to create artwork for each location, following the art direction. Environment artists would then build 3D layouts based on those designs. Finding an appropriate color palette for the game world was difficult; browns and monochromatic colors could depict the desired dark and moody atmosphere, but the developers wanted the aesthetic to resemble the vibrant color schemes of a comic book. To this end, they used saturated colors for in-game lighting. Lighting was an important component of the game, being used to highlight points of interest and to draw the player onward in otherwise boring corridors. To maintain the intended level of detail and allow the game's console versions to fit into the devices' memory, each area had to be streamed in and out of memory seamlessly to free up memory for textures and geometry. All of the cutscenes were storyboarded by Rocksteady artists, being visualized in the game engine before the character performances were motion-captured. The design team decided that cutscenes should be used to advance character relationships, and that after each cutscene the player should have had their goal changed or the importance of their actions modified. Priority was given to keeping action scenes under the player's control, rather than showing them in cutscenes.

== Marketing and release ==
A demo version of the game was released via digital download for the PlayStation 3 on August 6, 2009, and for Xbox 360 and Microsoft Windows on August 7. The PlayStation 3 version of Arkham Asylum unlocked a Batcave-themed virtual apartment for players on the social-gaming platform, PlayStation Home. Additionally, North American game retailer GameStop ran a contest which allowed one winner to be rendered in-game as an Arkham inmate. A series of action figures based on character designs from the game were released through Warner Bros.' outlet DC Direct.

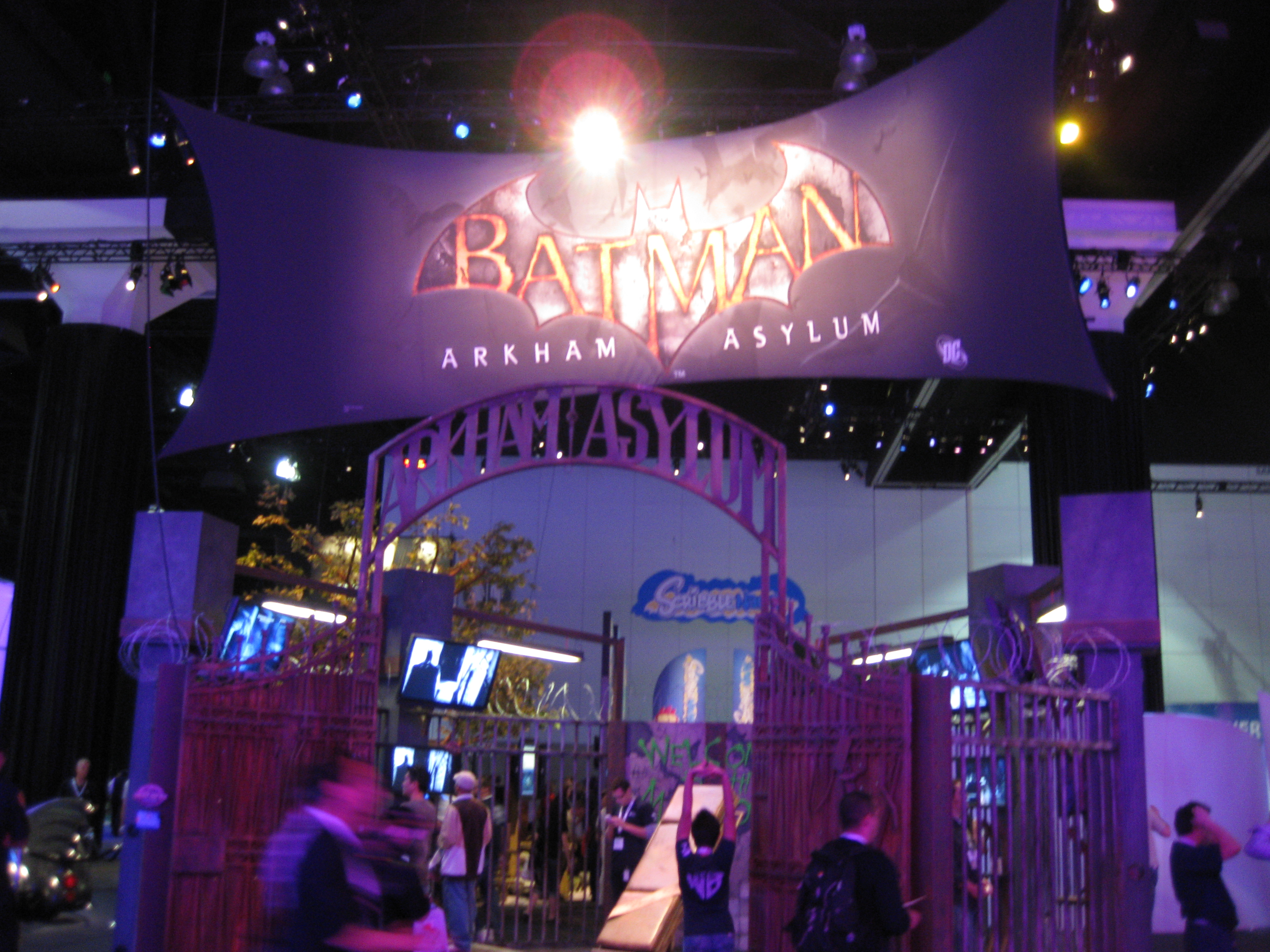
Promotion at E3 2009

Batman: Arkham Asylum was released for PlayStation 3 and Xbox 360 in North America on August 25, 2009, and on August 28 in Europe and Australia. It was released for Microsoft Windows in North America on September 15, 2009, and on September 18 in Europe and Australia. A Game of the Year edition was released on March 26, 2010, in Europe and on May 11 in North America. Feral Interactive developed a Mac OS X version, which was released on disc and as a download on November 3, 2011. On the Windows version of the game, the developers used an anti-duplication measure that disables Batman's glide ability and causes other bugs, preventing copied games from progressing beyond a certain point. Although not the first game to implement such countermeasures, Arkham Asylum received media coverage, as this was seen as a novel method of copy protection. A version of the game for the Nintendo Wii, developed by Red Fly Studios, was cancelled during development.

A "Collector's Edition" containing the game, a 14-inch (36 cm) replica of Batman's batarang, a behind-the-scenes DVD, a leather-bound 48-page book about Arkham's inmates, and a code to download the "Crime Alley" challenge map was released. Pre-ordering the game at some retailers allowed access to the "Dem Bones" challenge map. The "Game of the Year Edition" was initially announced for release only in Europe, Asia, and Australia, but a North American release was later added. This edition includes the game, support for TriOviz 3D visual effects, two pairs of themed 3D glasses, and the six released DLC challenge maps—two of which were omitted from the North American version.

=== Downloadable content ===
In April 2009, it was announced that the Joker would be a downloadable playable character for use in the game's challenge maps exclusively for the PlayStation 3 and Mac OS X. Additional DLC packs were later released. The Insane Night pack, containing the "Totally Insane" combat and "Nocturnal Hunter" stealth challenge maps, was released on September 17, 2009. The Prey in the Darkness pack was released on September 23, 2009, and contains the "Heart of Darkness" combat and "Hothouse Prey" stealth challenge maps. In North America, the Prey in the Darkness pack was released exclusively for the PlayStation 3 and Mac OS X.

=== Other releases ===
Batman: Return to Arkham, developed by Virtuos, is a compilation featuring remastered versions of Arkham Asylum and Arkham City using Unreal Engine 4 for the PlayStation 4 and Xbox One. Additionally, both games include all previously released downloadable content. The compilation was released on October 18, 2016.

Batman: Arkham Trilogy, developed by Turn Me Up, features ports of Arkham Asylum, Arkham City and Batman: Arkham Knight for the Nintendo Switch that was launched on December 1, 2023.

== Reception ==
=== Critical reception ===
Reception

Aggregate score
| Aggregator | Score |
|---|---|
| Metacritic | 91/100 (PS3); 92/100 (X360); 91/100 (PC) |

Review scores
| Publication | Score |
|---|---|
| 1Up.com | A− |
| Computer and Video Games | 9.2/10 |
| Edge | 8/10 |
| Eurogamer | 9/10 |
| Game Informer | 9.5/10 |
| GameSpot | 9/10 |
| Giant Bomb | 5/5 |
| IGN | 9.3/10 |
| X-Play | 4/5 |
| The Daily Telegraph | 9/10 |
| Wired | 9/10 |

Batman: Arkham Asylum received critical acclaim. Aggregating review website Metacritic gave the Xbox 360 version 92/100, the PlayStation 3 version 91/100, and the Microsoft Windows version 91/100. The game held the Guinness World Record for "Most Critically Acclaimed Superhero Game Ever" based on an average Metacritic score of 91.67, until it was succeeded by Arkham City.

Arkham Asylum was called one of the best comic book superhero games ever made. Edge magazine said it was "by some distance the best superhero game of modern times", IGN's Greg Miller called it "the greatest comic book game of all time", and Eurogamer's Dan Whitehead called it "the best superhero game bar none", and wrote that it has "excellent visuals, a compelling story and superb voice acting." Whitehead also wrote, even without the iconic superhero, it would be a polished and engrossing game featuring compelling story and superb voice acting. PSM3's Andy Kelly wrote, "Rocksteady have struck the perfect balance of giving you the confident power of a superhero, but with enough weaknesses to make the game challenging; a remarkable feat of balancing and design". Wired's Chris Kohler said that the game's strength lies in its tight script and masterful acting, making what could be a generic game captivating. 1UP.com's Thierry Nguyen gave the game an A−, stating that Rocksteady "manages to combine combat, stealth, storytelling, and cartoon voices into the best digital Batman simulator we've seen to date."

Several reviewers compared Arkham Asylum to other games—including BioShock for its ability to deliver a unique adventure and establish a connection with the game world, and its innovative ideas; The Legend of Zelda for its adventuring style; Metroid for its world layout; and Resident Evil and Tomb Raider for its classic action-adventuring that acts as a true hybrid of brawling, stealth, and platforming.

The game world's design and the game's attention to detail were well received by critics. Game Informer's Andrew Reiner said the game's setting had a taut and mesmerizing atmosphere, and was a place of wonder and inexplicable horror. Miller called it the right mix of creepy and cool, and appreciated the gradual damage reflected on Batman's suit as the story progressed, but said that pixelated CGI and lip synching issues diminished the presentation. Whitehead said that the impressive animation makes Batman feel alive, but wrote that the world itself was lifeless and lacking in interactive objects. He criticized segments in which character logic was sacrificed for video game tropes, citing repeated use of poison gas and electric floors as obstacles.

The combat system was well received for the simplicity of its implementation, allowing players to use it effectively without learning complex combinations of special moves, and the emphasis upon timing and flow to create fluid, graceful, and satisfyingly brutal attacks. Reviewers said that the combat remained challenging with the inclusion of more difficult-to-overcome enemies, and better use of combat was well incentivized without punishing those unable to master it. The design of stealth and the wide variety of methods available to disable enemy opponents were praised. Computer and Video Games' Andy Robinson wrote that it is a "thinking man's stealth game" that is the centerpiece of the game, and Edge said that the stealth offering was thrilling. Others wrote about the way in which enemies react with fear to the elimination of their allies, but some reviewers criticized the AI for allowing Batman to easily escape when discovered, and for being oblivious to Batman's presence. Whitehead said that stealth was not as directly rewarding as combat, citing difficulty in controlling Batman at close quarters and the inconsistent contextual actions.

Arkham Asylum's boss fights were criticized, with many reviewers labeling them as the game's biggest failing. Reviewers found that the battles often rely on old-fashioned, tedious, and repetitive game tropes that required the player to learn and repeat monotonous routines—some of which, in the case of Bane, had already been employed on lesser enemies—or to confront repetitive attack patterns and one-hit deaths. Reviewers generally agreed that the fights were anticlimactic to their build-up spectacle. The final boss fight with the Joker was singled out for vapid gameplay, a battle with Killer Croc was labeled boring and overly long, and the reviewers said these should not have been in the game. However, the fear toxin-induced hallucination segments of Scarecrow's battles were almost unanimously praised as some of the game's best and most cerebral moments for their fourth wall manipulation, subversion of the game's established narrative and expectations, and meta-textual influences that were compared to the battle against Psycho Mantis in 1998's Metal Gear Solid, and 2002's Eternal Darkness.

The main voice cast—including Conroy as Batman, Sorkin as Harley Quinn, Valenza as Poison Ivy, and Wingert as Riddler—was well received, but Hamill's performance received consistent praise, with reviewers commenting upon his excellent inflection and timing on a cackling, maniacal performance that steals the show. Nguyen said that Dini and Hamill's Joker was the best depiction of the character outside of The Killing Joke and Heath Ledger's incarnation in the 2008 film The Dark Knight.

=== Sales ===
Worldwide, the game sold nearly two million units in its first three weeks of release, and had sold 2.5 million by the end of September 2009. According to NPD Group, Batman: Arkham Asylum sold approximately 593,000 units in North America during the five tracked days following its release on August 25. By December 2009, the PlayStation 3 version of the game had outsold the Xbox 360 version by approximately 10,000 units despite multi-platform titles typically selling better on the Xbox 360 at the time. The exclusive content featuring the Joker as a playable character was cited as a possible reason for the success of the PlayStation 3 version. The game took two of the top five spots on the US software chart in its first week of release, and topped the UK all-format chart for two weeks. By October 2011, the game had sold 4.3 million copies worldwide.

=== Awards ===
At the 2009 Spike Video Game Awards, Rocksteady Studios won Studio of the Year, while the game received nominations for Best Action Adventure Game, Best Graphics, Best Voice for Hamill and Sorkin, respectively, Best Xbox 360 Game, and Game of the Year. As part of the AIAS' 13th Annual Interactive Achievement Awards, Batman: Arkham Asylum won outstanding achievement in "Game Design", "Adapted Story", and "Character Performance" (Mark Hamill as the Joker); it also received nominations for "Game of the Year", "Adventure Game of the Year", and outstanding achievement in "Animation", "Original Music Composition", and "Game Direction". At the 6th British Academy Video Games Awards, it won the awards for Best Game and Gameplay, and received nominations for Action, Original Score, Story, Use of Audio, Artistic Achievement, and the publicly voted GAME Award of 2009. It won Best Game Design at the 10th Game Developers Choice Awards, and was nominated for Game of the Year and Best Writing. It was also nominated for Best Sound Editing: Computer Entertainment for the 2010 Golden Reel Awards. The National Academy of Video Game Trade Reviewers awarded the game in the categories Game of the Year, Character Design, Control Design, Costume Design, Game Design, Sound Editing in a Game Cinema, Supp Performance in a Drama (Mark Hamill), Use of Sound and Game Sequel Action. The Official Xbox Magazine 2009 Game of the Year Awards awarded the game in two categories: Licensed Game of the Year and Developer of the Year (Rocksteady Studios). At the 2010 Develop Awards the game won in two categories: Best Use of a Licence or IP and In-House Studio (Rocksteady Studios). The game also gained two nominations (Audio of the Year and Best Dialogue) at the Game Audio Network Guild Awards. According to Metacritic, on all platforms, Arkham Asylum was tied with God of War Collection and Forza Motorsport 3 as the fourth-highest-rated game of 2009. It was also the highest-rated Microsoft Windows game alongside Dragon Age: Origins and Street Fighter IV, the third-highest-rated Xbox 360 game alongside Forza Motorsport 3, and the fifth-highest-rated PlayStation 3 game alongside FIFA 10 and Killzone 2.

Several international video game websites and magazines labeled Arkham Asylum as their favorite Game of the Year and as their favorite Action/Adventure Game.

Batman: Arkham Asylum appeared on several lists of the top video games of 2009. It was placed at number one by The A.V. Club, number two by CNET, Time, Eurogamer and CraveOnline, number three by Complex, IGN UK, Joystiq, and The Daily Telegraph, number four by CBC News.ca, and Wired, number five by Gamasutra, Entertainment Weekly and IGN Australia and number six by the Los Angeles Times. Game Informer also included the game on its list of the 50 best videogames of 2009.

Giant Bomb named it the 2009 Best Multiplatform Game, GamesRadar labeled it their Game of the Year ahead of Uncharted 2: Among Thieves, and Eurogamer listed it on their "Games of 2009" series. GameSpot listed it as having the Best Atmosphere and the Best Use of a Creative License as part of their "Best Games of 2009" series, and at IGN's Best of 2009 Awards the game was awarded as Best PC Action Game and Best Xbox 360 story and it was nominated in the categories Award for Excellence in Sound (PS3), Best Action Game (PS3), Best Story (PS3), PS3 Game of the Year, Best Action Game (Xbox 360), Award for Excellence in Sound (Xbox 360), Xbox 360 Game of the Year, Award for Excellence in Sound (PC), Best Story (PC), PC Game of the Year. IGN named the game as Best Newcomer on its IGN Select Awards. Newsarama named the game as Best Super-hero Game 2009. GameTrailers named the title both Best Action-Adventure Game and Biggest Surprise of 2009. At The Escapist Awards, the game was awarded as Game of the Year and it was nominated as Best Action-Adventure Game. The game was also awarded in the category Best Graphics by Feed Your Console and as Game of the Year by HollywoodJesus, Thunderbolt, VG-Reloaded and eGamer.

In 2013, Eurogamer listed it as the 20th-best game of the contemporary console generation, Game Informer named it the second-best superhero game of all time, and GamingBolt listed it as the 89th-greatest game ever made. In 2014, Empire ranked it 28th on their list of the Greatest Video Game of All Time, behind Arkham City at number 12, and IGN listed it as the 22nd-best game of the console generation. In 2015, PC Gamer named it the 50th-best PC game, and IGN listed it as the 91st-Top Game of All Time. In 2017, IGN ranked the Scarecrow hallucination sequences 35th on their Top Unforgettable Video Game Moments list. In 2019, The Guardian placed the game 34th on its list of the 50 best videogames of the 21st century. In 2023, Digital Trends placed the game 21st on its list of the 50 best videogames of all time.

List of awards and nominations
| Year | Award | Category | Recipient | Result | Ref. |
|---|---|---|---|---|---|
| 2009 | Spike Video Game Awards | Best Action Adventure Game | Batman: Arkham Asylum | Nominated | |
| 2009 | Spike Video Game Awards | Best Graphics | Batman: Arkham Asylum | Nominated | |
| 2009 | Spike Video Game Awards | Best Voice | Arleen Sorkin for Harley Quinn | Nominated | |
| 2009 | Spike Video Game Awards | Best Voice | Mark Hamill for The Joker | Nominated | |
| 2009 | Spike Video Game Awards | Best Xbox 360 Game | Batman: Arkham Asylum | Nominated | |
| 2009 | Spike Video Game Awards | Game of the Year | Batman: Arkham Asylum | Nominated | |
| 2009 | Spike Video Game Awards | Studio of the Year | Rocksteady Studios | Won | |
| 2009 | National Academy of Video Game Trade Reviewers | Game of the Year | Batman: Arkham Asylum | Won | |
| 2009 | National Academy of Video Game Trade Reviewers | Animation, 3D | Batman: Arkham Asylum | Nominated | |
| 2009 | National Academy of Video Game Trade Reviewers | Art Direction | Batman: Arkham Asylum | Nominated | |
| 2009 | National Academy of Video Game Trade Reviewers | Camera Direction in a Game Engine | Batman: Arkham Asylum | Nominated | |
| 2009 | National Academy of Video Game Trade Reviewers | Character Design | Batman: Arkham Asylum | Won | |
| 2009 | National Academy of Video Game Trade Reviewers | Control Design, 3D | Batman: Arkham Asylum | Won | |
| 2009 | National Academy of Video Game Trade Reviewers | Costume Design | Batman: Arkham Asylum | Won | |
| 2009 | National Academy of Video Game Trade Reviewers | Direction in a Game Cinema | Batman: Arkham Asylum | Nominated | |
| 2009 | National Academy of Video Game Trade Reviewers | Game Design | Batman: Arkham Asylum | Won | |
| 2009 | National Academy of Video Game Trade Reviewers | Graphics/Technical | Batman: Arkham Asylum | Nominated | |
| 2009 | National Academy of Video Game Trade Reviewers | Lighting/Texturing | Batman: Arkham Asylum | Nominated | |
| 2009 | National Academy of Video Game Trade Reviewers | Sound Editing in a Game Cinema | Batman: Arkham Asylum | Won | |
| 2009 | National Academy of Video Game Trade Reviewers | Sound Effects | Batman: Arkham Asylum | Nominated | |
| 2009 | National Academy of Video Game Trade Reviewers | Supp Performance in a Drama | Mark Hamill for The Joker | Won | |
| 2009 | National Academy of Video Game Trade Reviewers | Use of Sound | Batman: Arkham Asylum | Won | |
| 2009 | National Academy of Video Game Trade Reviewers | Writing in a Drama | Batman: Arkham Asylum | Nominated | |
| 2009 | National Academy of Video Game Trade Reviewers | Game Sequel Action | Batman: Arkham Asylum | Won | |
| 2010 | 13th Annual Interactive Achievement Awards | Game of the Year | Batman: Arkham Asylum | Nominated | |
| 2010 | 13th Annual Interactive Achievement Awards | Adventure Game of the Year | Batman: Arkham Asylum | Nominated | |
| 2010 | 13th Annual Interactive Achievement Awards | Outstanding Achievement in Adapted Story | Batman: Arkham Asylum | Won | |
| 2010 | 13th Annual Interactive Achievement Awards | Outstanding Achievement in Animation | Batman: Arkham Asylum | Nominated | |
| 2010 | 13th Annual Interactive Achievement Awards | Outstanding Achievement in Character Performance | Mark Hamill for The Joker | Won | |
| 2010 | 13th Annual Interactive Achievement Awards | Outstanding Achievement in Game Design | Batman: Arkham Asylum | Won | |
| 2010 | 13th Annual Interactive Achievement Awards | Outstanding Achievement in Game Direction | Batman: Arkham Asylum | Nominated | |
| 2010 | 13th Annual Interactive Achievement Awards | Outstanding Achievement in Original Music Composition | Batman: Arkham Asylum | Nominated | |
| 2010 | BAFTA Video Games Awards | Action | Batman: Arkham Asylum | Nominated | |
| 2010 | BAFTA Video Games Awards | Artistic Achievement | Batman: Arkham Asylum | Nominated | |
| 2010 | BAFTA Video Games Awards | Best Game | Batman: Arkham Asylum | Won | |
| 2010 | BAFTA Video Games Awards | GAME Award of 2009 | Batman: Arkham Asylum | Nominated | |
| 2010 | BAFTA Video Games Awards | Gameplay | Batman: Arkham Asylum | Won | |
| 2010 | BAFTA Video Games Awards | Original Score | Batman: Arkham Asylum | Nominated | |
| 2010 | BAFTA Video Games Awards | Story | Batman: Arkham Asylum | Nominated | |
| 2010 | BAFTA Video Games Awards | Use of Audio | Batman: Arkham Asylum | Nominated | |
| 2010 | Game Audio Network Guild Awards | Audio of the Year | Batman: Arkham Asylum | Nominated | |
| 2010 | Game Audio Network Guild Awards | Best Dialogue | Batman: Arkham Asylum | Nominated | |
| 2010 | Game Developers Choice Awards | Best Game Design | Batman: Arkham Asylum, Sefton Hill and Ian Ball | Won | |
| 2010 | Game Developers Choice Awards | Best Writing | Batman: Arkham Asylum | Nominated | |
| 2010 | Game Developers Choice Awards | Game of the Year | Batman: Arkham Asylum | Nominated | |
| 2010 | Develop Awards 2010 | Best Use of a Licence or IP | Batman: Arkham Asylum | Won | |
| 2010 | Develop Awards 2010 | In-House Studio | Rocksteady Studios | Won | |
| 2010 | Golden Reel Awards | Best Sound Editing: Computer Entertainment | Batman: Arkham Asylum | Nominated | |
| 2010 | 26th Annual TEC Awards | Interactive Entertainment Sound Production | Batman: Arkham Asylum | Nominated | |

== Legacy ==
Arkham Asylum's success launched a series of Batman: Arkham sequels, beginning in October 2011 with Batman: Arkham City. Set one year after the events of Arkham Asylum, it is the direct sequel to the earlier game. It was developed by Rocksteady Studios, and distributed by Warner Bros. Interactive Entertainment. Manipulated by Hugo Strange, Gotham City's mayor Quincy Sharp closes Arkham Asylum and Blackgate prison, and converts a section of the city's slums into an open air prison known as Arkham City, to house all of Gotham's criminals. While a wary Batman watches over the activities in Arkham City, the Joker is dying from his consumption of Titan. The sequel introduces several new characters—including Hugo Strange, Robin, Catwoman, Ra's al Ghul, and Mr. Freeze—to the series. A limited, six-issue comic series, also titled Batman: Arkham City—bridging the plots of Arkham Asylum and Arkham City—was written by Paul Dini and featured art by Carlos D'Anda. The first issue was released on May 11, 2011. A third installment of the Arkham series (not developed by Rocksteady), Batman: Arkham Origins, was released in October 2013, featuring a story set before the events of Arkham Asylum. A narrative sequel to Arkham City, Batman: Arkham Knight, was released on June 23, 2015, and is the series' concluding chapter.

Writer Grant Morrison said the game was the inspiration for their Batman Incorporated comic book. They said they wanted to "capture the feeling of the Batman: Arkham Asylum game ... When I played that game, it was the first time in my life where I actually felt what it is like to be Batman ... We are now the heroes, and we can look through their eyes."
