= Varjak Paw =

2003 book by S. F. Said

- First edition
- Author: S. F. Said
- Illustrator: Dave McKean
- Language: English
- Genre: Fantasy, Adventure
- Publisher: David Fickling Books
- Publication date: 1 January 2003
- Publication place: United Kingdom
- Media type: hardback paperback
- Pages: 255
- ISBN: 0-385-60415-7 (hardback); ISBN 0-552-54818-9 (paperback)
- OCLC: 50938878
- LC Class: PZ7.S1315 Var 2003
- Followed by: The Outlaw Varjak Paw

Varjak Paw is a 2003 gothic fantasy adventure novel written by British author S. F. Said and illustrated by Dave McKean. The novel received the 2003 Smarties Gold Award for the 6–8 years range and has been adapted for other media.

== Plot ==
Varjak Paw is a Mesopotamian Blue kitten who lives in the Contessa's house with his grandfather, his parents, his Aunt Juni, his cousin Jasmine, his older brother Julius, and his three younger brothers, Jay, Jethro, and Jerome. Varjak's ancestor and idol, Jalal Paw, was a courageous adventurer who migrated from Mesopotamia to London, but his descendants have become complacent cats, preferring not to go outside.

One day, Varjak is listening to Elder Paw, his grandfather, who is telling him a story about Jalal Paw. Varjak suddenly feels exasperated with the story, thinking that he would never have an adventure like that. Varjak becomes curious about the garden, but when he attempts to leave he is stopped by his parents. His mother tells him they are purebred Mesopotamian cats and that they do not need to get their paws dirty. Varjak protests, but is teased by Jasmine and his brothers.

After the Contessa falls ill and dies, a giant stranger and a pair of cats enters the Contessa's house, passing Varjak and upstairs into the Contessa's room, where the cats are not allowed to go. The Mesopotamian Blues call the stranger "The Gentleman", and he bribes them with a mouse toy and caviar.

Shortly after, the Elder Paw calls a family meeting. During the family meeting, the Elder Paw reveals that he had met The Gentleman several years prior, where he wanted to take the cats away. Everyone except Varjak ignores his warning.

Later, after losing a fight with Julius, Varjak goes outside, meeting the Elder Paw. There, he asks Varjak to find a dog, which he describes as a monster big enough to scare The Gentleman away. He then teaches his grandson The Way of Jalal, which has been passed down from generations. Even though there are seven skills in The Way of Jalal, the Elder Paw knows only three: "Slow-Time", "Moving Circles", and "Shadow Walking".

After Varjak memorizes them, The Gentleman comes out with his cats and whispers something in their ears before leaving. The Elder Paw, seeing this, advises Varjak to escape. Varjak does so successfully, but the Elder Paw is killed by The Gentleman's cats while fighting them. Varjak goes unconscious after he lands on a fragile tree branch, falling to the ground. While he is unconscious, he meets an old cat in a dream, and after failing to prove that he truly knows The Way, the old cat reveals himself to be Jalal. He teaches Varjak the first skill, which is to keep an open mind.

Varjak runs away into the city, where he meets a black-and-white cat, Holly, and her best friend, a brown cat named Tam. Varjak learns of the Vanishings — the mysterious disappearances of cats off the streets. He travels with Holly and Tam.

Later, when he travels into Sally Bones' territory, he learns more about the villain and a bit about the Way.

The fight between him and the fierce white cat Sally Bones is interrupted by a dog, Cludge. Cludge knocks Varjak out, but when Varjak wakes, he finds that the dog meant no harm and is even friendly. He befriends Cludge.

Tam disappears, and Varjak finds a grotesque toy cat inside a cardboard box, which has every aspect of a real cat. He and Holly return to his house, where his family wants Varjak to stay. Soon after, however, Holly is captured by the Gentleman.

Varjak goes upstairs and discovers dozens of cats inside a large cage, trapped by the Gentleman and his creepy cats. It is revealed that the Gentleman is taking them into a room and killing them to make toys out of them, although the exact methods are never discovered. The cats come back out with glassy fake eyes and collars, with the sound boxes and mechanical movements of a doll, although they look and smell exactly like real cats.

Varjak kills one of the black cats by snipping off its collar — the source of the Gentleman's power — and the other falls. The Gentleman is about to kill Varjak when Cludge jumps through the window and scares him off.

Varjak is named a hero but decides to live on the streets, leaving his family at the house. Outside, he decides to start his own gang and try to defeat Sally Bones and her gang.

== Characters ==
- Varjak Paw, a very young kitten and the protagonist of the story.
- Jalal the Paw, a Mesopotamian blue cat who ventured out into the Outside and found a home with the Contessa.
- Elder Paw, Varjak's grandfather and one of the few who remembers (part of) The Way of Jalal. And also the one that trusts and talks to Varjak in the family of Jalal.
- Sally Bones, the mysterious white cat who lords over the West Side of the city. She knows "The Way".
- Razor, Sally Bones' lieutenant.
- Ginger, the ruler of the East Side of the city.
- The Contessa, the old woman who owns the family of Jalal.
- The Gentleman, a mysterious man who appears one day at the Contessa's house.
- The Black Cats, two black cats that accompany The Gentleman, perfect fighting machines that are almost invulnerable.
- Cludge, a dog who Varjak meets and who saves him from the Gentleman.
- Julius Paw, Varjak's older brother
- Father, son of Elder Paw, father of Jay, Jerome, Jethro, Julius, and Varjak.
- Aunt Juni, mother to Jasmine, aunt to Jay, Jethro, Jerome, Julius, and Varjak.
- Mother, mother of Jay, Jethro, Jerome, Julius, and Varjak.
- Holly, Varjak's future mate.
- Tam, a tabby cat and Holly, and Varjak's best friend.

== Background ==
The book's title and protagonist's name come from Said's own cat named Varjak, whose name is a reference to the film Breakfast at Tiffany's. In the film, one of the main characters, Paul Varjak, has written a book called "Nine Lives". When he and another character look for the book in the library catalog, it is listed as "Nine Lives by Varjak, Paul".

== Adaptations ==
=== Theatre ===
In October 2013, Playbox Theatre Company took on Varjak Paw in a major multi-media production.

=== Opera ===
In 2010, composer Julian Philips completed an opera on Varjak Paw, to a libretto by Kit Hesketh-Harvey, performed by The Opera Group in September–November.

=== Film ===
As of March 2006, Varjak Paw has been optioned by The Jim Henson Company to be developed as an animated family feature film, with Faith Fawusi as director.

== Sequel ==
The book spawned a sequel in 2005, The Outlaw Varjak Paw.
