= Crazy Hair =

Book by Neil Gaiman

- Author: Neil Gaiman
- Illustrator: Dave McKean
- Language: English
- Genre: Children's
- Publisher: HarperCollins
- Publication date: May 26, 2009
- Publication place: United States
- Media type: Hardcover
- Pages: 40
- ISBN: 0-06-057908-0

Crazy Hair is a book by Neil Gaiman and Dave McKean, published in 2009 in the United States by HarperCollins, and in the United Kingdom by Bloomsbury. It is based on a poem by Gaiman, with artwork by McKean. In the story a father and daughter discover the joys of his crazy hair.

It is also available in Italian and in French.

== Reception ==
The book was well received, with positive reviews. It was a runner up for the Kate Greenaway Award (2010).
