= S. F. Said =

British children's writer (born 1967)

S. F. Said FRSL
- Born: 1967 (age 58–59); Beirut, Lebanon
- Education: University of Cambridge
- Occupation: Writer
- Writing career
- Period: 2003–present
- Genres: Children's fantasy, science fiction
- Notable work: Varjak Paw
- Website: sfsaid.com

S. F. Said (born 1967) is a British children's writer.

His first novel was Varjak Paw (2003), illustrated by Dave McKean and published by David Fickling Books in January 2003; four months later in the U.S., Varjak Paw won the 2003 Nestlé Smarties Book Prize. The sequel, The Outlaw Varjak Paw (2005), won the 2007 Blue Peter Book of the Year. Phoenix (2013) is a longer novel written for older children. It was shortlisted for the Guardian Children's Fiction Prize and was selected to represent the U.K. on the IBBY Honour List for 2016. Tyger, his fourth book, won Children's Book of the Year at the 2023 British Book Awards and The Week Junior Book Awards, and was Waterstones Children's Book of the Month for September 2023.

== Biography ==
S. F. Said is a British Muslim author of Middle Eastern background, who was born in Beirut and spent his first years in Jordan. He describes his origins as "Iraqi, Egyptian, Kurdish, and Circassian." He grew up in London, moving there with his mother at the age of two. After graduating from the University of Cambridge, he worked as a press attaché and speech writer for the Crown Prince of Jordan's office in London for six years. He began a Ph.D. in 1997 looking at the lives of young Muslims in Britain, but left academia to focus on film journalism for The Daily Telegraph – where he brought attention to much so-called world cinema, including contemporary Islamic cinema – and on writing for children. Said has also written a number of articles and reviews for The Guardian about children's books. From March to September 2023, Said was the Writer in Residence at UK children's reading charity Booktrust.

== Writing career ==
S. F. Said has published four novels for children thus far. Varjak Paw tells the story of a Mesopotamian Blue cat called Varjak who leaves his sheltered upbringing to explore the city and learn the "Seven Skills of the Way", taught to him in dreams by his ancestor Jalal. In his dreams, Varjak finds himself transported from his gritty urban surroundings to the deserts, rivers and mountains of Mesopotamia (ancient Iraq). With the Skills, he is able to fight the Gentleman. Varjak was staged as a play by Playbox Theatre, and was performed as an opera by The Opera Group in 2008. Said wrote 17 drafts of the book.

In the sequel, The Outlaw Varjak Paw (2005), the domineering "white cat with one eye", Sally Bones, invades the territories of other cats and ruling them with torture and terror, and Varjak leads the other cats – and some dogs – in the fight against her. In 2020, Blue Peter asked the audience to vote for their all-time favourite Blue Peter Book Award-winner, and The Outlaw Varjak Paw was included in the top ten.

Phoenix is not a Varjak-world novel. The Internet Speculative Fiction Database calls it young-adult science fiction rather than (animal) fantasy. It made the shortlist of four books for the 2014 Guardian Children's Fiction Prize, whose judges recommended it for ages 10 and up, and whose coverage by The Guardian called it a "space epic".

Said has contributed an essay to The Gifts of Reading (2020), an anthology inspired by Robert Macfarlane's essay of the same name. He also contributed a story to The Book of Hopes (2020), edited by Katherine Rundell, an anthology for young readers that raised money for NHS charities during the COVID-19 pandemic in the U.K.

Tyger, is Said's latest novel. The Times writes that the "novel shares that fight of good against evil, but this time the lead cat is a magical “tyger”, an immortal being who comes to an alternative 21st-century London where the abolition of slavery was never achieved and empire is still going great guns". Tyger takes its name from William Blake's poem The Tyger, and the British Science Fiction Association Review called the book "a pure delight, reminding us of the creative possibilities and breath-taking power of words and images on the printed page." It was an Editor's Choice for The Bookseller magazine prior to publication in August 2022.

Additionally, Said has judged a number of major U.K. book prizes, including the Costa Book Awards, the Guardian Children Fiction Prize, the inaugural Amnesty/CILIP Honour, and the BookTrust Lifetime Achievement Award.

== Books ==
- Varjak Paw, illustrated by Dave McKean (David Fickling Books, 2003)
- The Outlaw Varjak Paw, illus. Dave McKean (David Fickling, 2005)
- Phoenix, illus. Dave McKean (David Fickling, 2013), 489 pp., OCLC 859389140
- Tyger, illus. Dave McKean (David Fickling, 2022), 304 pp.

== Awards and recognition ==
- Nestlé Smarties Book Prize (2003) – Varjak Paw
- Blue Peter Book Award, Book of the Year (2007) – The Outlaw Varjak Paw
- IBBY Honour List (2016) – Phoenix
- Foyles Children's Book of the Year (2022) - Tyger
- British Book Awards for Best Children's Book 2023 - Tyger
- The Week Junior Book Awards for Best Children's Book: Older Readers 2023 - Tyger
- Fellow of the Royal Society of Literature (2021)
