= Black Orchid (character) =

DC Comics character

- Black Orchid's debut: Adventure Comics #428 (Aug. 1973), cover art by Bob Oksner.

Publication information
- Publisher: DC Comics
- First appearance: Adventure Comics #428 (July 1973)
- Created by: Sheldon Mayer; Tony DeZuniga

In-story information
- Alter ego: Susan Linden-Thorne; Flora Black; Suzy; Alba Garcia
- Team affiliations: Justice League; Suicide Squad; Parliament of Trees; Justice League Dark; A.R.G.U.S.
- Abilities: Human-plant hybrid with superhuman strength, speed, agility, and durability Flight; Shapeshifting; Chlorokinesis; Magic; Mystical connection to the Green

Black Orchid is a superheroine appearing in American comic books published by DC Comics. The character first appeared in Adventure Comics #428 (cover-dated July 1973).

The character has undergone numerous changes in her biography and powers over the years. Initially, her identity was a mystery, and her primary power was mastery of disguise, often impersonating background female characters. Various speculations about her origins were presented, but ultimately refuted.

In 1988, writer Neil Gaiman introduced an origin story for Black Orchid, giving her the name Susan Linden-Thorne and the background of a human-plant hybrid, connected to other DC Universe plant-human hybrids like Swamp Thing and Poison Ivy. After Linden was murdered by her abusive husband, her DNA was used to create plant-human hybrids, one of which took up her mantle after Linden's death. The character was relaunched again in 1993 as Flora Black, with the ability to manipulate pheromones and control minds, making her a femme fatale. This series saw Flora's demise and a younger version, Suzy, taking up the mantle of Black Orchid. In the 2011 reboot of DC's continuity, The New 52, a new version of the character named Alba Garcia was introduced. Alba is a former army private whose arms were amputated, and she transforms into a purple Swamp Thing-like creature. Her powers involve the ability to shape-shift and manipulate elemental forces.

Throughout all the different versions, the powers of the Black Orchid character have varied but generally include super-strength, flight, durability, and the power of disguise or shape-shifting.

== Development ==
When designing Black Orchid, artist Tony DeZuñiga took inspiration from Cymbidium canaliculatum, a plant with dark purple petals, and Black Condor. He stated that he "read the character description and [recalled that] in the ’40s there was this character called the Black Condor, but [since] that was a male superhero, [he] took some ideas and revised [it] to a female form."

== Fictional character biographies ==
=== Susan Linden-Thorne ===
Although she has a number of superpowers (including flight, super-strength, and invulnerability to bullets) her main ability is a mastery of disguise. She often spends an entire investigation impersonating a seemingly insignificant female background character, with the other characters only discovering her involvement at the end of the story upon finding the woman she impersonated and an abandoned disguise with her calling card, a black orchid.

After appearing in Adventure Comics #428–430, a backup feature starring the character ran in The Phantom Stranger #31–32, 35–36, and 38–41 (1974–1976). Black Orchid subsequently appeared sporadically, including cameos in Crisis on Infinite Earths, Blue Devil, Deadshot, and Invasion!. She had a larger role in Suicide Squad as a member of the eponymous team. She also had an appearance in the non-continuity children's comic book Super Friends #31.

While Adventure Comics #428 proclaimed on its cover that it was an "origin issue", almost no background on the character was given, not even her name. Until Neil Gaiman described her origin, the character was known for her lack of an origin. Instead, writers teased the audience with several possible origins, all refuted. In Adventure Comics #429, Barry DeMorte hypothesizes that either yoga master Lucinda "Cindy" Harper or anti-gravity specialist Daphne Wingate is Black Orchid, and he kidnaps both. When Black Orchid comes to the rescue, he learns otherwise. In The Phantom Stranger #38, writer Michael Fleisher posited racecar driver Ronnie Kuhn as a possible secret identity for Black Orchid. In the next issue, Kuhn is revealed to be an admirer of Black Orchid and member of the "Black Orchid Legion", a group of scientists and criminals who developed suits to mimic Black Orchid's powers. In a non-canon Super Friends comic, civilian Lisa Patrick believes that Black Orchid is a Kryptonian and attempts to kill her with Kryptonite.

In Blue Devil Annual #1, Madame Xanadu and Phantom Stranger provide competing origins for Black Orchid, which respectively parody Daredevil and Spider-Man.

In 1988, the character was relaunched in the three-issue miniseries Black Orchid, written by Neil Gaiman and illustrated by Dave McKean. The miniseries fleshed out the character considerably, providing an origin story which explained how and why she became known as Black Orchid. It also gave the character a civilian name in her origin sequence, Susan Linden-Thorne. Instead of being a normal super-powered human (or metahuman in the DC Universe), her background was changed to be that of a human-plant hybrid with ties to the Green. After the miniseries concluded, DC Comics intended to put Black Orchid in Suicide Squad as a comic relief character, but replaced her with Poison Ivy after Gaiman's objections. Gaiman had also wanted to write a sequel to that series called Black Orchard, an "ecological Invasion of the Body Snatchers", but it never materialized because he did not want to make it without Dave McKean or at least an artist he liked as much.

=== Flora Black ===
The surviving Black Orchids, both having the consciousness and limited memories of Linden, become as mother and daughter, one being significantly smaller and younger than the other, and although the younger is initially more aware of Linden's memories, these swiftly degenerate. The elder goes under the alias of Flora Black to meet with Sherilyn Sommers, her closest friend.

An ongoing Black Orchid series, published under the Vertigo Comics imprint, featuring the new Black Orchid, ran for 22 issues from 1993 to 1995. Written by Dick Foreman, it saw the second version of the character use pheromone manipulation as mind control to become a femme fatale, breaking and marrying millionaire Elliot Weems to claim his fortune and company business as her own. She then became the series' major villain in the closing story arc, before perishing in the final issue. Her companion, a child version of Black Orchid heretofore nicknamed "Suzy", had matured over the course of the series, taking up the mantle of the Black Orchid as a young adult. Suzy features prominently in The Black Orchid Annual #1, part 2 of Vertigo's The Children's Crusade crossover. The Annual was published between issues #4 and #5 of the ongoing series.

=== Suzy ===
The grown-up Suzy is identical to her "sister" and carries on the tradition in both the DC Universe and related Vertigo titles. She has appeared in four event titles: 1999's Totems one-shot, Justice Leagues (2001), Day of Vengeance (2005), and Infinite Crisis (2006). She is at present an ally of the Shadowpact and the Birds of Prey.

An unidentified Black Orchid appears in Trinity as a member of an alternate universe Justice League.

=== Alba Garcia ===
A new Black Orchid resembling the original (with a slightly modernized costume) appears in The New 52 continuity reboot. In this new timeline, she is assigned to the Justice League Dark by Steve Trevor and is an agent of A.R.G.U.S. Her name has been revealed to be Alba Garcia, a former army private whose arms had been amputated. She transforms into a purple Swamp Thing-like creature after being trapped in another dimension.

== Powers and abilities ==
The first Black Orchid had superhuman physical abilities, flight, and was a master of disguise. The second and third Black Orchids had super strength, flight, and could absorb nutrients from the air. The second version could also generate seductive pheromones and was seen to change her eye pigmentation, commenting that skin, hair, and eye color were easy for adjust (presumably linking back to her predecessors' disguise ability).

The New 52 version of the character can shapeshift by channeling the Red and the Green.

== Other versions ==
- An alternate universe version of Black Orchid appears in JLA: The Nail as a prisoner of Cadmus Labs.
- An alternate universe version of Black Orchid appears in Flashpoint: Secret Seven. This version is a member of the eponymous group who was killed years prior.

== In other media ==
=== Television ===
- An unidentified incarnation of Black Orchid makes a non-speaking appearance in the teaser for the Batman: The Brave and the Bold episode "The Mask of Matches Malone!". This version possesses botanokinesis.
- An incarnation of Black Orchid was intended to appear in Constantine before the series was cancelled.

=== Film ===
- An unidentified incarnation of Black Orchid appears in the DC Animated Movie Universe (DCAMU) film Justice League Dark, voiced by Colleen O'Shaughnessey. This version is a manifestation of the House of Mystery's magic with a desire to experience human nature.
- An unidentified incarnation of Black Orchid makes a minor appearance in the DCAMU film Justice League Dark: Apokolips War, where she is killed in an attempt to destroy Darkseid's Reaper machine.

=== Video games ===
An unidentified incarnation of Black Orchid appears as a character summon in Scribblenauts Unmasked: A DC Comics Adventure.

=== Miscellaneous ===
- An unidentified incarnation of Black Orchid makes non-speaking cameo appearances in DC Super Hero Girls as a student of Super Hero High.
- The Susan Linden-Thorne incarnation of Black Orchid, via an altered version of the cover of her debut appearance in Adventure Comics #428, appears as an Easter egg in Fallout: New Vegas.
