= Arkham Asylum: A Serious House on Serious Earth =

1989 Batman graphic novel by Grant Morrison

- Cover of Arkham Asylum: A Serious House on Serious Earth

Publication information
- Publisher: DC Comics
- Publication date: October 1989
- Main character(s): Batman; Joker; Amadeus Arkham

Creative team
- Written by: Grant Morrison
- Artist: Dave McKean
- Letterer: Gaspar Saladino

Collected editions
- Trade paperback: ISBN 0930289560
- Hardcover: ISBN 093028948X
- Trade paperback (Warner Books): ISBN 0446391891
- Trade paperback (Titan Books): ISBN 1852862807
- 15th Anniversary Edition: ISBN 1401204244
- 25th Anniversary Edition: ISBN 1401251250
- Absolute Edition: ISBN 1401294200
- 2020 trade paperback: ISBN 1779504330
- Deluxe Edition: ISBN 1779513178

Arkham Asylum: A Serious House on Serious Earth (often shortened to Batman: Arkham Asylum) is a 1989 superhero horror graphic novel written by Grant Morrison and illustrated by Dave McKean. The story follows the vigilante Batman, who is called upon to quell a maddening riot taking place in the infamous Arkham Asylum, a psychiatric hospital housing the most dangerous supervillains in Gotham City. Inside, Batman confronts many of his enduring rogues gallery, such as the Joker, Two-Face, and Killer Croc. As Batman ventures deeper, he discovers the origin of how the asylum was established, the history of its founder Amadeus Arkham, and the supernatural and psychological mystery that has been haunting the mansion.

Upon its release, the graphic novel garnered commercial and wide critical acclaim and is considered by many to be one of the greatest Batman stories of all time, and one of the best works in Grant Morrison's career. Morrison's narrative and Dave McKean's artistic style were described as a more mature, unique, psychologically driven and horror-oriented take on the Batman mythos and distinct from other conventional superhero works. The graphic novel would later become the definitive story of Arkham Asylum, a critical part of the Batman mythos. The critically acclaimed, similarly titled video game Batman: Arkham Asylum, the first game in the Batman: Arkham series, was partially influenced by the graphic novel.

== Plot ==
On April 1, Commissioner Gordon informs Batman that the patients of Arkham Asylum, led by the Joker, have taken over the facility, threatening to murder the staff unless Batman agrees to meet with them. Among the hostages are Dr. Charles Cavendish, Arkham's administrator, and Dr. Ruth Adams, a therapist. At the asylum, Batman discovers that Two-Face's mental condition has deteriorated as a result of Adams' therapy; she replaced Two-Face's trademark coin with a six-sided die, then a tarot deck, increasing the number of choices he has in the hope that he will eventually not leave any of his choices up to chance. Instead, the treatment renders him incapable of making even the simplest decisions, such as going to the bathroom.

The Joker forces Batman into a game of hide and seek, giving him one hour to escape Arkham before his adversaries are sent to hunt him down. Through the asylum, Batman encounters Clayface, Doctor Destiny, Scarecrow, Mad Hatter, Maxie Zeus, and Killer Croc. He reaches a secret room in the towers, where he finds Cavendish holding Adams hostage. It is revealed that Cavendish orchestrated the riots, and has Batman read the diary of the asylum's founder, Amadeus Arkham, when questioned why.

In flashbacks, it is shown that Arkham's mentally ill mother, Elizabeth, suffered delusions of being tormented by a supernatural entity. After believing to have seen the creature himself (a bat), Arkham killed her to end her suffering. He blocked out the memory, only to have it return after an inmate, Martin "Mad Dog" Hawkins, raped and murdered Arkham's wife and daughter. Traumatized, Arkham vowed to bind the evil spirit of "The Bat" with sorcery. He killed Hawkins during a shock therapy session and continued his mission even after he was incarcerated in his own asylum, up until his death.

Cavendish came to believe that he was destined to continue Arkham's work. On April Fools' Day (the date Arkham's family was murdered), Cavendish released the patients and lured Batman to the asylum, believing him to be the bat Arkham spoke of. He accuses Batman of feeding the evil of the asylum by bringing it more insane souls and they fight, which ends when Adams slashes Cavendish's throat to save Batman.

Batman breaks down the front door of the asylum, proclaiming that the inmates are now free. He returns Two-Face's coin to him, stating that it should be up to him to decide his fate at the hands of the inmates. Two-Face declares that they will kill Batman if the coin lands scratched side up and let him go if the unscarred side lands. He flips the coin and declares Batman free. As the Joker bids Batman goodbye, the inmates return to their cells and the police arrive to retake the asylum. Two-Face looks at the coin and it is revealed that it actually landed scratched side up, implying that he made his own choice. He turns to the stack of tarot cards and knocks them over, reciting a passage from Alice's Adventures in Wonderland: "Who cares for you? You're nothing but a pack of cards".

== Conception and influences ==
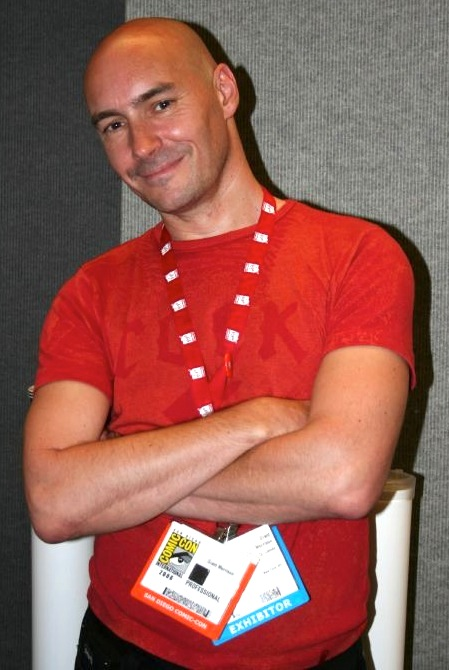
Grant Morrison, writer of Arkham Asylum: A Serious House on Serious Earth

Arkham Asylum was Grant Morrison's first work on Batman, and they would later note that the story was intended to be the start of their own version in the Batman saga. The subtitle A Serious House on Serious Earth is taken from the last stanza of Philip Larkin's poem "Church Going", which reads:

"A serious house on serious earth it is,
In whose blent air all our compulsions meet,
Are recognised, and robed as destinies.
And that much never can be obsolete,
Since someone will forever be surprising
A hunger in himself to be more serious,
And gravitating with it to this ground,
Which, he once heard, was proper to grow wise in,
If only that so many dead lie round".

The annotated script is a bonus material printed on every Arkham Asylum graphic novel since the 15th anniversary edition (2004), containing Morrison's full script that breaks down and explains much of the symbolic references in the story. The introduction page details the genesis behind Morrison's work coming to fruition.

Morrison and their fellow friend, Jim Clements, were fascinated by Len Wein's short and evocative paragraphs written on the history of Arkham Asylum in the Who's Who series during the development of the story. After the research, Morrison decided to use the tragedy of Amadeus Arkham as part of the story they wanted to tell. The thrill of the Arkham Asylum narrative was influenced by Frank Miller's The Dark Knight Returns and Alan Moore's Watchmen, inspiring Morrison, who wanted to make their own take on Batman in comics since they liked the authors' storytelling abilities and freedom to push the boundaries of comics to a greater degree.

Len Wein ... had written a few short and evocative paragraphs on the history of Arkham Asylum and it was here I learned of poor Amadeus Arkham, the hospital's founder, whose wife and daughter had been murdered by Martin "Mad Dog" Hawkins. In Wein's précis, Arkham's madness was described as a result of the stock market crash of 1929. It occurred to me that having one's wife and daughter slaughtered by a man named "Mad Dog" might have been sufficient cause for a nervous breakdown, so I decided to explore and expand on the life of this throwaway character.

— Introduction page of the annotated script.

The intention was to create something that was more like a piece of music or an experimental film than a typical adventure comic book. I wanted to approach Batman from the point of view of the dreamlike, emotional and irrational hemisphere, as a response to the very literal, "realistic" "left brain" treatment of superheroes which was in vogue at the time, in the wake of The Dark Knight Returns, Watchmen and others.

— Introduction page of the annotated script.

=== Themes and style ===
The setting of Arkham Asylum plays a large role in how the inmates perceive their own insanity. Morrison conceived the graphic novel's storytelling technique to stay away from the original hardboiled pulp influence of Batman and those seen in American cinema adaptations. Style from European cinema, symbolism, and psychological horror themes were used to depict how insanity works within the setting of the asylum, referencing Lewis Carroll, Carl Jung, and Aleister Crowley. Hypostasis was used to push the story forward with psychoanalytic theory and Jungian archetypes were influences.

The story's themes were inspired by Lewis Carroll, quantum physics, Jung, and Crowley; its visual style by surrealism, Eastern European creepiness, Cocteau, Artaud, Švankmajer, the Brothers Quay, etc.

— Introduction page of the annotated script.

The story is woven tightly around a small number of symbolic elements, which combine and recombine throughout, as if in a dream.

The moon, the shadow, the mirror, the tower, and the mother's son.

The construction of the story was influenced by the architecture of a house — the past and the tale of Amadeus Arkham forms the basement levels. Secret passages connect ideas and segments of the book. There are upper stories of unfolding symbol and metaphor. We were also referencing sacred geometry, and the plan of the Arkham House was based on the Glastonbury Abbey and Chartres Cathedral. The journey through the book is like moving through the floors of the house itself. The house and the head become one.

— p. 2 of the annotated script.

The psychological themes of the Batman villains were deconstructed from their usual style seen in other comics. Examples include Maxie Zeus, an electrified, emaciated figure with messianic delusions, and obsessed with electric shocks and coprophagia; Clayface is rapidly wasted from lack of feeding and is described as a "AIDS with two legs"; the Mad Hatter, whose obsession with Alice in Wonderland has pedophilic overtones; Killer Croc was originally drawn as suffering deformities similar to those of Joseph Merrick, the "Elephant Man", although his final incarnation is that of a humanoid crocodile; both Amadeus Arkham and Charles Cavendish are seen cross dressing. The Joker's mental condition is described as a form of "super sanity" in which he re-invents himself every day to suit his circumstances; he may be a harmless prankster one moment and a homicidal maniac the next. Joker is portrayed with a somewhat homosexual element, described as being indirectly "in love" with Batman. In the annotated script, Morrison initially wanted the Joker to "wear make-up and black lingerie in parody of Madonna". DC's editors, however, removed this, believing that readers might assume that Jack Nicholson's portrayal of the character in the Batman film would be portrayed as a transvestite.

Batman in this graphic novel is described as '80s interpretation of the character's violent, driven, and borderline psychopathic when he is driven close to the breaking point as he ventures the entire asylum in the story. Despite the horror-oriented themes, Morrison clarified that the symbolic concept is only for this book alone, and that their future Batman projects would not have the same form of tone.

The portrayal of Batman presented here is not definitive and is not necessarily how I would write the character otherwise. The repressed, armored, uncertain and sexually frozen man in Arkham Asylum was intended as a critique of the '80s interpretation of Batman as violent, driven, and borderline psychopathic. My own later portrayal of Batman in the JLA comic was one which emphasized the character's sanity and dignity.

— p. 5 of the annotated script.

=== Artwork ===
A panel from Arkham Asylum, showing Dave McKean's artwork and letterer Gaspar Saladino's distinctive lettering treatment

Dave McKean drew the principal art and the cover art of the Arkham Asylum graphic novel with Morrison supplying their own thumbnail layouts to the artist as guide of how each page should function coherently. In illustrating the story, McKean chose to blend paintings, drawings, photography, and mixed-media collage to come up with striking page designs, and dense symbols. The artist used symbolism, imagery, and surrealism, and many scenes involve the use of symbols to denote a particular psychological device. For example, a Greek inscription can be seen scratched on the doorway of Maxie Zeus's electroshock chamber, which translates into "Discover thyself"; much of the symbolism was later explained and expanded in the annotated script.

Gaspar Saladino utilized distinctive lettering to give characters their own fonts and respective speech bubbles: Batman's is black with white lettering, Maxie gets blue with a Greek font, while Joker's speech is without a bubble at all; the red, ink-spattered script used for his dialogue is as ungovernable as the character himself. The practice of giving characters customized lettering treatments has since become widespread, especially in DC's Vertigo line and many Marvel comics.

=== Collected editions ===
Arkham Asylum was published in hardcover (ISBN 093028948X) and trade paperback (ISBN 0930289560) in 1989, the same year of Tim Burton's Batman film being released. Both Warner Books (ISBN 0446391891) and Titan Books (ISBN 1852862807) also published trade paperbacks in 1990.

The 15th anniversary edition was published in hardcover (ISBN 1401204244) and trade paperback (ISBN 1401204252) in 2004. This edition contains a brief biography of both Morrison and McKean, credits to those who involved in producing the first edition of the graphic novel, the annotated script, Morrison's personal thumbnail layouts, and an afterword by editor Karen Berger as bonus materials.

The 25th anniversary edition was published in hardcover (ISBN 1401251250) and trade paperback (ISBN 1401251242) in 2014. New bonus materials are Morrison's two-page synopsis, some extras in the Morrison's thumbnail layouts, and a gallery of McKean's rough sketches and original promotion art back in the 90s.

The absolute edition (ISBN 1401294200) was published in 2019 with McKean involved in designing the book. For this edition, McKean took the opportunity to change the colour of Joker's dialogues in the entire story from red and white back to wine red because this was what he always wanted back in the days, but somehow the design was changed in the post-production of the first edition. The majority of the bonus materials printed in the 15th and 25th anniversary editions are also presented in this book. New additions to this book are McKean's detailed description of how he designed this book and a few extras of the artist's rough sketches and promotion art. The trade paperback known as new edition (ISBN 1779504330) was published in 2020 under the banner of DC Black Label.

The hardcover deluxe edition (ISBN 1779513178) was published in 2021. This edition reuses the story pages from the absolute edition; the colour of Joker's dialogue is changed to wine red. The design of the book and bonus material pages offered in this edition retain the same format as the 25th anniversary edition.

Title	Format	Publisher	Region	Released dates	ISBN
Batman Arkham Asylum: A Serious House on Serious Earth	HC	DC Comics	US	1989	093028948X
Batman Arkham Asylum: A Serious House on Serious Earth	TPB	DC Comics	US	1989	0930289560
Batman Arkham Asylum: A Serious House on Serious Earth	TPB	Warner Books	US	1990	0446391891
Batman Arkham Asylum: A Serious House on Serious Earth	TPB	Titan Books	UK	1990	1852862807
Batman Arkham Asylum: A Serious House on Serious Earth 15th Anniversary Edition	HC	DC Comics	US	2004	1401204244
Batman Arkham Asylum: A Serious House on Serious Earth 15th Anniversary Edition	TPB	DC Comics	US	2004	1401204252
Batman Arkham Asylum: A Serious House on Serious Earth 25th Anniversary Edition	HC	DC Comics	US	2014	1401251250
Batman Arkham Asylum: A Serious House on Serious Earth 25th Anniversary Edition	TPB	DC Comics	US	2014	1401251242
Absolute Batman Arkham Asylum: A Serious House on Serious Earth	HC	DC Comics	US	2019	1401294200
Batman Arkham Asylum: A Serious House on Serious Earth New Edition	TPB	DC Comics	US	2020	1779504330
Batman Arkham Asylum: A Serious House on Serious Earth Deluxe Edition	HC	DC Comics	US	2021	1779513178

== Critical reaction and legacy ==
Upon the graphic novel's release, it became a commercial success and catapulted Morrison and McKean's names in the comic book industry. Editor Karen Berger revealed that it sold "close to a half million copies" by 2004, making it the best-selling original graphic novel in American superhero comics. According to the Grant Morrison website, the book has already sold over 600,000 copies worldwide.

Hilary Goldstein of IGN Comics praised the story and its "claustrophobic" portrayal of the asylum, saying that "Arkham Asylum is unlike any other Batman book you've ever read [and] one of the finest superhero books to ever grace a bookshelf". Goldstein also ranked Arkham Asylum #4 on a list of the 25 greatest Batman graphic novels, behind The Killing Joke, The Dark Knight Returns, and Year One. Rolling Stone praised the book as one of Grant Morrison's best works, calling it "[their] first big commercial hit". Joseph Szadkowski of The Washington Times called it "one of the key sequential-art stories of the Batman library".

Keith Dooley of Comics Authority described it as a "psychologically and visually jarring book [that] brings the reader along with Amadeus Arkham and Batman on their journeys through their psyches in a world full of symbolism", also adding that "Batman, his foes, and all of humanity are greatly affected by the power of symbolism, with this story laying before the reader that these fictional characters' stories are also, in many ways, our stories". Lucas Siegel from Newsarama also praised the comic, describing the art as "striking", "beautiful", and "disturbing".

=== Morrison's response ===
I imagined it being done by someone like Brian Bolland, and my vision was of it being ultra-real to the point of being painful. [. . .] But then when Dave McKean did it it became something quite different, because he wanted to make it more abstract. And I think that in a lot of ways, the ways we both approached it clashed in the middle. [. . .] I think it would have been easier for people to deal with if it had been a lot more concrete. – Morrison disagrees with DC assigning McKean as the artist of the graphic novel. Grant Morrison: Combining the Worlds of Contemporary Comics book, p. 68.

Despite the critical acclaim, Morrison was surprised to learn that the graphic novel was a success was due to the readers were enjoying McKean's art more than the story. Negative criticisms were mainly aimed at the heavy reliance on symbolism, which many found difficult to understand and felt that the story didn't work well together with the art. Morrison conducted several interviews to defend all the misunderstood meanings which those reasons lead to why they actually disagreed with McKean as the artist of the graphic novel. The statements made in the interviews were later published in the Grant Morrison: The Early Years and Grant Morrison: Combining the Worlds of Contemporary Comics books. When the graphic novel was reprinted in the 15th anniversary edition, Morrison saw the opportunity of supplying the original script with annotations and thumbnail layouts as bonus materials to reinforce every metaphor in the story.

According to the interview statements and bonus materials in the reprinted editions, Morrison originally intended the art to be in comic book illustrations, so that the graphic novel follows exactly the same narrative structure as many comic book titles despite the use of horror tones in the storytelling. Unfortunately, McKean never wished to adhere to most of the ideas Morrison wanted at all, he delivered fine art abstract rendering in his art which Morrison described as "doesn't have the most terrifying expressions of the real". McKean particularly had Morrison to revise the script in order to accommodate his time spending in his illustrations such as suggesting the removal of Robin from the story .

The original first draft of the script included Robin. Robin appeared in a few scenes at the beginning then remained at Police Headquarters for the bulk of the book, where he spent his time studying plans and histories of the house, in order to find a way in to help his mentor. Dave McKean, however, felt that he had already compromised his artistic integrity sufficiently by drawing Batman and refused point blank over for the Boy Wonder — so after one brave but ridiculous attempt to put him in a trench coat, I wisely removed him from the script.

— p. 4 of the annotated script.

Morrison retrospectively interpreted the development of the graphic novel as one where they "clashed in the middle" because McKean insisted on his own version of storytelling. The DC editors were willing to let McKean do whatever he wanted because his portfolio impressed them during the internal job interviews. Morrison opined that the graphic novel could have been much more concrete if a different comic book artist was assigned to do the job instead.

=== McKean's response ===
[The story] became sort of a symbolic play. We piled all this stuff on top of it, and dressed it up in its best clothes, and sent it out. Then I sat down afterwards and realized, "Why? Why bother? It's such an absurd thing to do". It's like suddenly realizing the fact that you're desperately trying to work around the subject matter – trying to make the book despite the subject, rather than because of it. At the end of the day, if you really love to do Batman comics, then that's probably the best thing to do. Not liking them, and then trying to make something out of them is just a waste of time.
Also, by the end of it I'd really begun to think that this whole thing about four-color comics with very, very overpainted, lavish illustrations in every panel just didn't work. It hampers the storytelling. It does everything wrong. It's very difficult to have any enthusiasm about it after that.

— McKean criticizing some of the horror tone in Morrison's script and the regular comic book illustration he was tasked to utilize.

== Sequel ==
During the 2017 San Diego Comic-Con, Morrison said that a sequel to the Arkham Asylum graphic novel is in the works, tentatively titled Arkham Asylum 2. Comic book artist Chris Burnham, who collaborated with Morrison in Batman Incorporated, was attached to work on the project. Described as a Luc Besson-esque thriller, the sequel is described to take place in the future timeline where Damian Wayne, Batman's son, has grown up to become an adult Batman of his own. While the graphic novel is described as a 120-page effort, further details or a release date have yet to be announced. In 2020, Morrison stated that the sequel is currently on hold due to their involvement on the Brave New World television series, but said that 26 pages were already written and they expressed interest in resuming the work. Morrison also commented that the sequel will have a different vibe than the Arkham Asylum graphic novel, feeling more like a work of Philip K. Dick.

The novel was cited as an inspiration by Heath Ledger while preparing for his role of the Joker in the film The Dark Knight (2008).

Batman: Bad Blood director Jay Oliva expressed an interest to make an animated film adaptation of Arkham Asylum: A Serious House on Serious Earth, but Oliva departed from Warner Bros. Animation in 2017 before such an adaptation could be made.

The game Batman: Arkham Asylum is loosely based on the comic, which follows a similar premise and also shares the same name. Although it was deemed an "ungamable graphic novel" by creative director Sefton Hill, its tone and psychological edge were a primary influence on the game. Additionally, the new warden of Arkham, Quincy Sharp, believes himself to be the reincarnation of Amadeus Arkham, and makes frequent reference to the history outlined in the comic, including Amadeus's mother's dementia, the murder of his wife and daughter by Martin Hawkins, and Amadeus' murder of Hawkins. Under this delusion, Sharp "haunts" the mansion and recreates several tableaux which appear in the comic, including the cell in which Amadeus inscribed his name into the floor.

== Sources ==
- Callahan, Timothy (2007) Grant Morrison: The Early Years. Masters of the Medium. Sequart Research & Literacy Organization. ISBN 978-0-615-21215-9
- Khouri, Andy. "Grant Morrison: The Early Years – Part II: Arkham Asylum", Comic Book Resources (July 6, 2007).
- Singer, Marc. (2011) Grant Morrison: Combining the Worlds of Contemporary Comics. University Press of Mississippi. ISBN 978-1-61703-136-6.
