= Violent Cases =

1987 short graphic novel by Neil Gaiman and illustrated by Dave McKean

- Violent Cases, cover art by Dave McKean
- Page count: 48 pages
- Publisher: Escape Books (1987); Titan Books (1991); Dark Horse (2002)

Creative team
- Writer: Neil Gaiman
- Artist: Dave McKean

Original publication
- Date of publication: 1987
- ISBN: 1569716064

Violent Cases is a short graphic novel written by Neil Gaiman and illustrated by Dave McKean. It was McKean's first published work in comics. Though drawn by McKean in shades of blue, brown, and grey, when it was first published by Escape Books in 1987, it was printed in black-and-white. Later editions have been printed in colour.

A narrator, who is drawn to look like Gaiman, tells of how, as a small child in Portsmouth, he was taken by his father to be treated by an osteopath who was once employed by Al Capone. The nature of the narrator's relationship with his father, the tales the osteopath told, and the disturbing events that followed, are partially obscured by the narrator's imperfect recollection, since he was not old enough to understand those properly at the time.

The book won the 1988 Mekon Award for "Best British Work", presented by the Society of Strip Illustration. It was nominated for the 1992 Harvey Award for "Best Graphic Album: Previous Released Material".
