= Dave McKean =

British artist (born 1963)

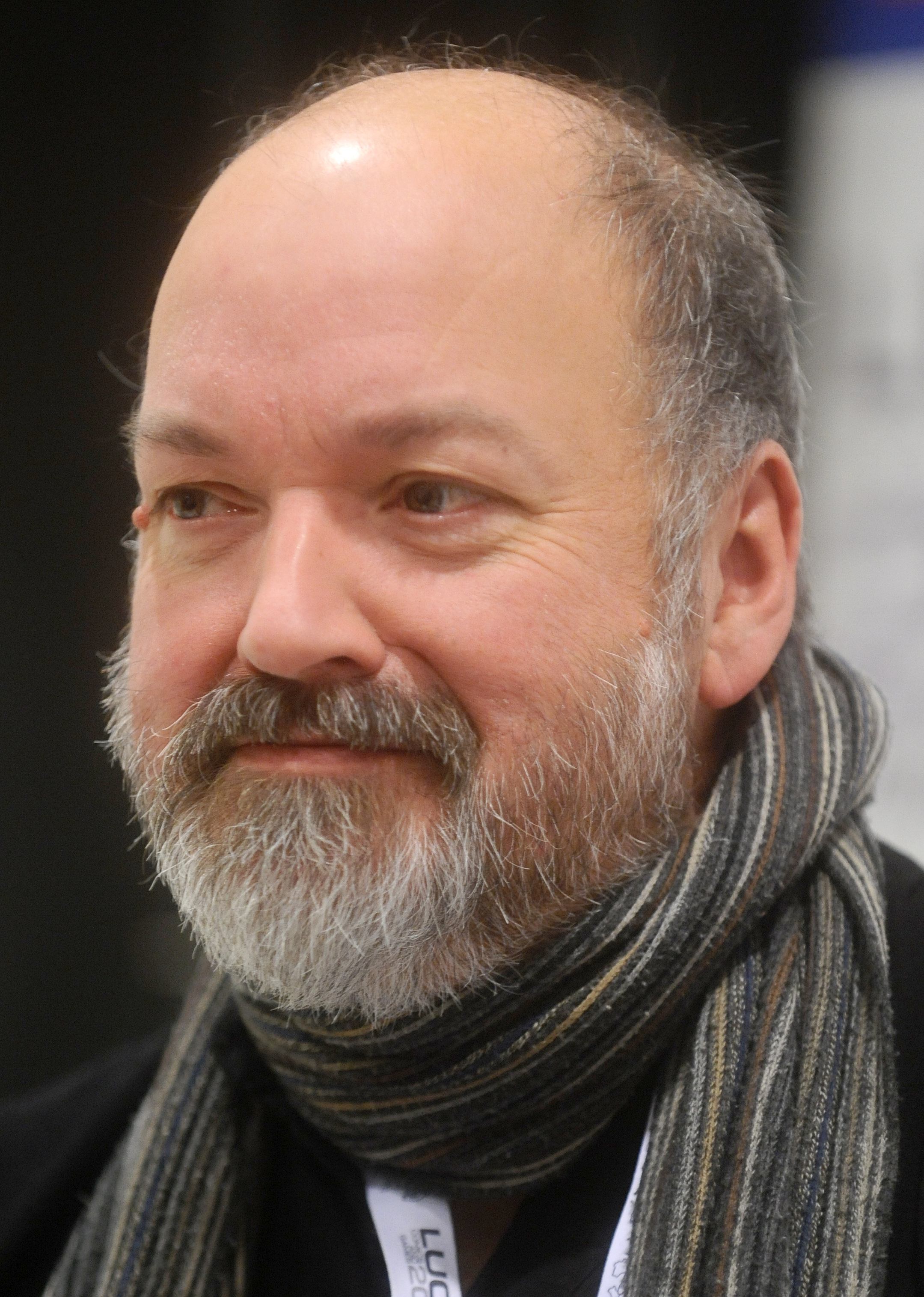
- McKean at Lucca Comics & Games 2018
- Born: David McKean; 29 December 1963 (age 62) Maidenhead, Berkshire, England
- Areas: Writer, Artist
- Notable works: Arkham Asylum: A Serious House on Serious Earth; The Big Fat Duck Cookbook; Cages; Hellblazer; The Sandman; The Tragical Comedy or Comical Tragedy of Mr. Punch; Violent Cases; The Wolves in the Walls; The Savage

David McKean (born 29 December 1963) is an English artist. His work incorporates drawing, painting, photography, collage, found objects, digital art, and sculpture. McKean has illustrated works by authors such as S.F. Said, Neil Gaiman, Grant Morrison, Heston Blumenthal, Ray Bradbury and Stephen King. He has also directed three feature films.

== Career ==
=== Comics ===
McKean first showed his work to editors at Marvel Comics, DC Comics, and Continuity Comics when visiting New York City in 1986. There, he met Neil Gaiman and the pair collaborated on the graphic novel Violent Cases, which was published in 1987. This was followed in 1988 by a Black Orchid miniseries and Hellblazer covers for DC Comics.

In 1989, McKean illustrated the Batman graphic novel, Arkham Asylum: A Serious House on Serious Earth, with writer Grant Morrison. The book was a commercial success, selling over 260,000 copies in hardcover and paperback. From 1989 to 1997, McKean created the covers for Gaiman's series The Sandman and many of its spin-offs. In 1998, the cover images from The Sandman were released in one volume titled Dustcovers: The Collected Sandman Covers. Further collaborations with Gaiman produced the graphic novels Signal to Noise and The Tragical Comedy or Comical Tragedy of Mr. Punch. In 1995 McKean wrote and illustrated a book for The Rolling Stones called Voodoo Lounge to tie in with the release of their album of the same name.

Between 1990 and 1996, McKean wrote and drew the ten issues of Cages, a graphic novel about artists and creativity.

McKean's collections of short comics Pictures That Tick, and Pictures That Tick 2: Exhibition were published by Dark Horse Comics in 2009 and 2015. Pictures That Tick won the Victoria and Albert Museum Illustrated Book of the Year award.

McKean created a wordless erotic graphic novel called Celluloid for Delcourt, which was published in the United States by Fantagraphics.

Black Dog: The Dreams of Paul Nash, which was commissioned by the 14-18 Now Foundation, The Imperial War Museum and The Lakes International Comic art Festival, was published in October 2016 by Dark Horse Comics as an oversized hardback and regular paperback.

Raptor was released in 2021 by Dark Horse Books and is the first of a proposed series of books featuring the character Sokol.

=== Illustration ===
McKean designed the posters for the Raindance Film Festival for five consecutive years between 1996 and 2000. In 1997 he wrote, directed and edited a 90-second trailer for the festival. In 2005, McKean designed the poster for the 32nd Telluride Film Festival. In 2006, he designed projections, sets and directed film clips for the Broadway musical Lestat.

McKean has also released picture books that include pictures from his trips. Examples include Postcards from Vienna, Postcards from Barcelona, Postcards from Paris (2008), Postcards from Brussels (2009), Postcards from Perugia (2011), Postcards from Bilbao (2012). He created another book of 200 pages called Squink (éditions BdArtist(e)) that gathered a number of drawings in 15 chapters.

=== Album and book covers ===
McKean has created album covers for many artists, including My Dying Bride, Counting Crows, Alice Cooper, Testament, Altan, Tori Amos, Download, Fear Factory, Front Line Assembly, Paradise Lost, Dream Theater, Stabbing Westward, Skinny Puppy, Suicide Silence, Toad the Wet Sprocket, Steve Walsh, and Delerium.

Bill Bruford's Earthworks commissioned McKean artworks for six of their albums from 1994 to 2004, as well as additional images for the 2019 Complete box set.

McKean has also made book covers for Jonathan Carroll, Iain Sinclair and Alan Moore.

=== Books of photography ===
McKean has published five books of photography:

- A Small Book of Black and White Lies (1995)
- Option: Click (1998)
- The Particle Tarot: The Major Arcana (2000)
- The Particle Tarot: The Minor Arcana (2006)
- Prompt: Conversations with Artificial Intelligence (2022)

=== Work with John Cale ===
McKean designed and illustrated John Cale's autobiography What's Welsh for Zen, a further biography called Sedition and Alchemy, a box set of C.D.s called Circus Live, and used John's Welsh-by-way-of-New York voice as the narrator for his short film Neon.

=== Children's picture books ===
McKean has collaborated with Neil Gaiman on four children's picture books, The Day I Swapped My Dad for Two Goldfish (1998), The Wolves in the Walls (2003), Crazy Hair (2009), and Mirrormask (2005), and illustrated Gaiman's children's novels Coraline (2002) and The Graveyard Book (2008), as well as S. F. Said's Varjak Paw (2003), Outlaw Varjak Paw (2006), Phoenix (2013) and Tyger (2022). The Wolves in the Walls: a Musical Pandemonium premiered as a play in Glasgow in 2006 with Improbable and the National Theatre of Scotland. The National Theatre of Scotland adapted The Day I Swapped My Dad for Two Goldfish into a promenade performance for young people in 2013. He illustrated David Almond's The Savage published in April 2008, Slog's Dad published in September 2010, and Mouse Bird Snake Wolf (2013). In 2011, McKean collaborated with Richard Dawkins on The Magic of Reality, an introduction to critical thinking and science for children. McKean also illustrated Ray Bradbury's The Homecoming (2006).

=== The Fat Duck Cookbook ===
In 2008, McKean collaborated with Heston Blumenthal on The Fat Duck Cookbook, an autobiography, compilation of key recipes and insight into Blumenthal's scientific method. The book was nominated in the James Beard Foundation Awards for Cooking from a Professional Point of View and won the Photography/Illustration award. In 2014, McKean collaborated again with Blumenthal and writer Pascal Clariss on Historical Heston, a collection of historically inspired recipes. The book won two James Beard Foundation Awards. McKean is the Director of Story at The Fat Duck, and helped to relaunch the restaurant after its refurbishment in 2015. He has created package designs, maps, menu designs and murals for The Fat Duck, as well as Dinner by Heston Blumenthal in London and Melbourne.

=== Stamps ===
McKean created six images for the Royal Mail's Mythical Creatures collection, which featured depictions of mythical creatures found in British folklore, including dragons, unicorns, giants, pixies, mermaids, and fairies. The collection was released in the UK on 16 June 2009. The Presentation Pack contains short descriptions of each subject by author Neil Gaiman.

=== Films ===
MirrorMask, McKean's first feature film as director, premiered at the Sundance Film Festival in January 2005. The screenplay was written by Neil Gaiman, from a story by Gaiman and McKean. A children's fantasy which combines live action and digital animation, MirrorMask was produced by Jim Henson Studios and stars a British cast Stephanie Leonidas, Jason Barry, Rob Brydon, and Gina McKee. Before MirrorMask, McKean directed a number of television intros and music videos as well as several short films, such as The Week Before (1998) and N[eon] (2002), which are included in the compilation DVD of McKean's work Keanoshow from Allen Spiegel Fine Arts. McKean directed The Gospel of Us, a film of the National Theatre Wales's Passion play in Port Talbot which stars Michael Sheen. The feature film Luna, written and directed by McKean and starring Stephanie Leonidas, Ben Daniels, Dervla Kirwan and Michael Maloney, debuted at the Toronto International Film Festival in September 2014.

McKean was a concept artist on the TV mini-series Neverwhere (1996), which was created and co-written by Neil Gaiman, and the feature films Harry Potter and the Prisoner of Azkaban (2004) and Harry Potter and the Goblet of Fire (2005).

=== Theatre and live performance ===
McKean wrote and performed a song cycle called Nine Lives at the Sydney Opera House as part of the Graphic Festival. This was also performed at the British Library and at LICAF.

McKean wrote the text for Wildworks' Wolf's Child site-specific theatre work as part of the Norwich Theatre Festival in 2015.

An Ape's Progress was a commission by the Manchester Literature/Jazz Festivals in 2015, and was created by poet Matthew Sweeney, composer/saxophone player Iain Ballamy, cellist Matthew Sharp, singer Emilia Martensson, accordionist Stian Carstensen, and pianist Kit Downes, with McKean providing film projections and keyboards. A book of the work accompanied the show.

Black Dog: The Dreams of Paul Nash is a multi-media, music, song and performance work commissioned by 14-18 Now Foundation and LICAF. McKean performs as narrator and pianist, Matthew Sharp as a performer, singer and cellist, and Clare Haythornthwaite as violinist/performer. It premiered in Amiens, and has been performed in Kendal. In 2016 it was performed in Rye, Ashford and at Tate Modern.

=== Music and jazz label ===
McKean is also an active musician and composer, playing keyboards and in some cases scoring his own films, such as Luna. In 1999, McKean founded the record label Feral Records with saxophonist Iain Ballamy. Feral has released music by Ballamy and his quartet called Food. In 2017, McKean released a World War I-themed album on Feral called Black Dog: The Dreams of Paul Nash, in collaboration with several musicians including cellist Matthew Sharp. McKean wrote the concept record as a 2016 commission from The Lakes International Comic Art Festival.

=== Video games ===
McKean created the cover art for Synnergist, a point-and-click adventure game released in 1996, the only video game he has made art for.

== Awards ==
McKean has won numerous awards and accolades. Over the years, he has been nominated five times for a World Fantasy Award in the category of "Artist", and he won the award in 1991. His graphic novel Cages won the Alph-Art, Pantera, and Harvey Awards for best Graphic Novel. He has been nominated six times and won three Spectrum Awards in the categories of "Advertising", "Book", and "Comic". His collection of short comics, Pictures That Tick won the V&A Museum Illustrated Book Awards Overall First Prize. In 2004, McKean won a BSFA Award in "Short Fiction" with Neil Gaiman for their work, The Wolves in the Walls. His film MirrorMask was nominated for the William Shatner Golden Groundhog Award for Best Underground Movie, the other nominated films were Green Street Hooligans, Nine Lives, Up for Grabs and Opie Gets Laid. Luna won Best British Feature at the Raindance Festival Awards, and also the Raindance Award at the Möet British Independent Film Awards. In 2017 McKean was the inaugural recipient of the "Sergio Aragones International Award for Excellence in Comic Art", given as part of The Lakes International Comic Art Festival.
