= Russell Ayto =

English children's illustrator

Russell Ayto is an English author and illustrator of children's books including many picture books.

== Biography ==
Russell was born in Chichester, Sussex in 1960 and grew up in Kidlington, Oxfordshire. After school he worked as a postman, then in the Histopathology Department of the John Radcliffe Hospital before studying at Oxford Polytechnic and Exeter College of Art and Design where he gained a degree in Graphic Design. He gained work with Observer Magazine and Time Out and began illustrating adult fiction before his work was spotted by Walker Books and he moved to illustrating children's fiction.

Russell has illustrated over 80 books, including The Cow That Laid an Egg by Andy Cutbill, Quacky Quack-Quack! and Whiff both by Ian Whybrow, and The Witch’s Children series by Ursula Jones. His illustration of The Witch’s Children go to School by Ursula Jones won the 2008 inaugural Roald Dahl Funny Prize.

Russell’s illustrations for The Cow That Almost Missed Christmas (2012) written by Andy Cutbill were adapted into an animated short film for the BBC, featuring the voices of Johnny Vegas and Miriam Margolyes. In 2015, SLR Productions launched a series of 52 x 11 minute animated episodes based on the picture books Captain Flinn and the Pirate Dinosaurs written by Giles Andre and illustrated by Russell Ayto. The third book in the Captain Flinn series, Captain Flinn and the Pirate Dinosaurs: The Magic Cutlass was later adapted into a stage performance by Les Petits Theatre Company in 2015.

Russell continues to work full time as an author. His self-illustrated books include The Match (2018), Henry and the Yeti (2017), and Mouse in the House (2020).

Russell currently lives with his family near Penzance, Cornwall.

== Recognition ==
- 2001 shortlist, Kate Greenaway Medal (for illustration); The Witch's Children by Ursula Jones
- 2003 Nestlé Smarties Book Prize, ages 0–5; The Witch's Children and the Queen by Ursula Jones
- 2004 shortlist, Greenaway Medal; One More Sheep by Mij Kelly
- 2008 shortlist, Booktrust Early Years Award, Pre-school; The Cow That Laid an Egg by Andy Cutbill
- 2008 Roald Dahl Funny Prize, ages 0–6; The Witch's Children go to School by Ursula Jones
- 2014 Honor, Irma Black Award

== Works ==
=== Adult cover art ===
- Oxford Coffee Houses, 1651–1800 by Norma Albertin-Potter and Alyx Bennett (Hampden, 1987)
- Why Are We in Vietnam? by Norman Mailer, later edition (Oxford University Press, 1988)
- Fludd by Hilary Mantel, first edition (Viking Press, 1989)

=== Children's books as writer ===
- The Other Day I Met a Bear, self-illustrated, Walker Books, 2001
- My Friend Joe, self-illustrated, HarperCollins, 2013
- Henry and the Yeti, self-illustrated, Bloomsbury, 2017
- Cats and Robbers, self-illustrated, Bloomsbury, 2019
- An Earth-Bots Solution to Plastic Pollution, self-illustrated, Kids Can Press, 2021
- Will You Be My Friend? self-illustrated, Andersen Press, 2021
- Mouse in the House, self-illustrated, Andersen Press, 2022

=== Children's books as illustrator ===
==== 1990s ====
- Harry and the Lady Next Door by Gene Zion, BBC Books, 1991
- Quacky Quack-quack! by Ian Whybrow, Walker Books, 1991
- Broops Down the Chimney by Nicholas Fisk, Walker Books, 1991
- Trouble at the North Pole by Effin Older Heinemann Young, 1992
- Cinderella and the Hot Air Balloon by Ann Jungman, Frances Lincoln, 1992
- Contact!: How to Cope With Contact Lenses – and the People Who Wear Them, by Phil Dodd and Jody Tresidder, Gollancz, 1992
- Denzil the Dog Polisher by Andrew Matthews, Methuen Young, 1993
- Little Luis and the Bad Bandit by Ann Jungman, Walker Books, 1993
- Lazy Jack by Vivian French, Walker Books, 1994
- The Stray Cat's Tale by Ian Strachan, Heinemann, 1995
- The Peckthorn Monster by Hazel Townson, Mammoth, 1995
- Mrs Potter's Pig by Phyllis Root, Walker Books, 1996
- Ella and the Naughty Lion by Anne Cottringer, Mammoth, 1996
- Henry Pond the Poet by Dick King-Smith, Hodder, 1996
- Tale of the Terrible Teeth by Hazel Townson, Heinemann, 1996
- A Little Too late! by Shirley Jackson, Ladybird Books, 1997
- Rollerblading Royals by Karen Wallace, Hodder, 1997
- A Funny Sort of Dog by Elizabeth Laird, Mammoth, 1997
- The Worm and the Toffee Nosed Princess by Eva Ibbotson, Hodder, 1997
- ·Baby Bird by Joyce Dunbar, Walker Books, 1998
- A Hiccup on the High Seas by Karen Wallace, A & C Black, 1998
- Let the Sun Shine by Kaye Webb (editor), Frances Lincoln, 1998
- Choose Your Superhero (poems) by Norman Silver, Hodder, 1998
- Gordon (Pet Pals) by Anne Cottringer, Orchard Books, 1999
- Where's Tim's Ted? by Ian Whybrow, HarperCollins, 1999
- Whiff by Ian Whybrow, Doubleday, 1999

==== 2000s ====
- You'll Soon Grow, Alex by Andrea Shavick, Orchard Books, 2000
- Happy Family by Shirley Jackson, Ladybird, 2000
- Where’s the Magician? by Marie Birkinshaw, Ladybird, 2001
- A Poem a Day, by Adrian Mitchell, Orchard Books, 2001
- My Dog by June Crebbin, Walker Books, 2001
- Herbie Monkey by Martin Waddell, Walker Books, 2001
- The Witch's Children by Ursula Jones, Orchard Books, 2001
- Strange Exchange by Pat Thomson, Barn Owl Books, 2002
- Fat Cat by James Sage, HarperCollins, 2002
- Emily's Legs by Dick King-Smith, Hodder, 2002
- Going Up by Martin Waddell, Walker Books, 2003
- Cup Run by Martin Waddell, Walker Books, 2003
- The Witch's Children and the Queen by Ursula Jones, Orchard Books, 2003
- Super Sue by Cressida Cowell, Candlewick Press, 2003
- Star Striker Titch by Martin Waddell, Walker Books, 2003
- Mr Beast by James Sage, HarperCollins, 2004
- One More Sheep by Mij Kelly, Hodder, 2005
- Captain Flinn and the Pirate Dinosaurs by Giles Andreae, Puffin Books, 2005
- Super Sue at Super School by Cressida Cowell, Candlewick Press, 2005
- One Voice, Please by Sam McBratney, Walker Books, 2005
- The Big Adventure (Monster & Frog) by Rose Impey, Orchard Books, 2006
- Get Fit (Monster & Frog) by Rose Impey, Orchard Books, 2006
- Tim, Ted and the Pirates by Ian Whybrow, HarperCollins, 2006
- The Slippery Wallpaper (Monster & Frog) by Rose Impey, Orchard Books, 2006
- The Terrible Toothache (Monster & Frog) by Rose Impey, Orchard Books, 2006
- All-in-together Cake (Monster & Frog) by Rose Impey, Orchard Books, 2006
- The Haunted Tent (Monster & Frog) by Rose Impey, Orchard Books, 2006
- Mind the Baby (Monster & Frog) by Rose Impey, Orchard Books, 2007
- Captain Flinn and the Pirate Dinosaurs: Missing Treasure! by Giles Andreae, Puffin, 2007
- The Cow That Laid An Egg by Andy Cutbill, HarperCollins, 2007
- Captain Flinn and the Pirate Dinosaurs Activity Book by Giles Andeae, Puffin, 2008
- Where Teddy Bears Come From by Mark Burgess, Puffin, 2008
- The Cow That Was the Best Moo-Ther by Andy Cutbill, HarperCollins, 2009
- The Witch's Children Go to School by Ursula Jones, Orchard Books, 2009
- The Best Cow in Show by Andy Cutbill, HarperCollins, 2009
- Captain Flinn and the Pirate Dinosaurs – The Magic Cutlass by Giles Andreae, Puffin, 2009

==== 2010s ====
- The Love Bugs by Simon Puttock, HarperCollins, 2010
- Captain Flinn and the Pirate Dinosaurs – Smugglers Bay! by Giles Andreas, Puffin, 2010
- First Week at Cow School by Andy Cutbill, HarperCollins, 2011
- Are the Dinosaurs Dead, Dad? by Julie Middleton, Picture Corgi, 2012
- Dustbin Dad, by Peter Bentley, Simon & Schuster Children’s UK, 2013
- The Somethingosaur, by Tony Mitton, HarperCollins, 2013
- A Very Pirate Christmas, by Timothy Knapman, Egmont Books, 2014
- Top Top Secret, by Claire Freedman, Simon & Schuster, 2014
- Whoops! by Suzi Moore, Templar Publishing, 2015
- Old Misery, by James Sage, Kids Can Press, 2018
