= Booktrust Early Years Award =

Annual literary prizes for children's picture books

Booktrust Early Years Awards
- Description: Annual literary prizes for children's picture books
- Country: United Kingdom
- Presented by: Booktrust
- Reward: £2000 (per category)

The Booktrust Early Years Awards, originally the Sainsbury’s Baby Book Award(s), was a set of annual literary prizes for children's picture books. It was administered by Booktrust, an independent charity that promotes books and reading; from 1999 to 2004. The Booktrust Early Years Awards was sponsored by the supermarket chain Sainsbury's with its last award give in 2010.

As of 2005 there were three categories: the Baby Book Award, the Pre-School Award, and the Best Emerging Illustrator Award. The winners in each category received £2000 with the Emerging Illustrator also receiving a specially commissioned award. The publishers of the winning books were given awards too.

== Honorees ==
Booktrust Early Years Award winners and shortlists
Year	Category	Author/Illustrator	Title	Publisher	Result
1999	N/A	Helen Oxenbury	Tickle, Tickle	Walker Books	Winner
1999	N/A	Steve Bland	Woof!	Macmillan Children's Books	Shortlist
1999	N/A	Lucy Cousins	Humpty Dumpty and Other Nursery Rhymes	Macmillan Children's Books	Shortlist
1999	N/A	Debbie MacKinnon and Anthea Sieveking	Find My Cake!	Frances Lincoln	Shortlist
1999	N/A	Jan Ormerod	Peek-a-Boo!	Dutton Children's Books	Shortlist
1999	N/A	Nick Sharratt	A Bear with a Pear	Macmillan Children's Books	Shortlist
2000	N/A	Alex Ayliffe	Boo Barney	Orchard Books	Winner
2001	N/A	Sandra Lousada	Baby Faces	Baby Campbell	Winner
2001	N/A	Debi Gliori	Where, Oh Where, is Baby Bear?	Little Orchard	Shortlist
2001	N/A	Annie Kubler	If You're Happy and You Know It...	Child's Play	Shortlist
2001	N/A	Jo Lodge	Baby's Very First Book: Farm	Baby Campbell	Shortlist
2001	N/A	Mandy Ross and Kate Merritt	Peekaboo Baby!	Ladybird	Shortlist
2001	N/A	Nicola Smee	Sleepyhead	Baby Campbell	Shortlist
2002	N/A	Annie Kubler	Head, Shoulders, Knees and Toes	Child's Play	Winner
2003	N/A	Sam Lloyd	Happy Dog, Sad Dog	Little Tiger Press	Winner
2003	N/A	Lara Jones	Goodnight, Poppy Cat	Campbell Books	Shortlist
2003	N/A	Roger Priddy	Baby Activity Centre	Priddy Books	Shortlist
2003	N/A	DK Team	Baby Fun: Five in the Bed	Dorling Kindersley	Shortlist
2003	N/A	Fiona Watt and Rachel Wells	That's Not My Bear	Usborne Publishing	Shortlist
2003	N/A	Amanda Wood and Fiona Macmillan	Baby Boo!	Templar	Shortlist
2004	Baby Book	David Ellwand and Mike Jolley	I Love You!	Templar	Winner
2004	New Illustrator	Polly Horner	Polly and the North Star	Orion	Winner
2004	Pre-School	Julia Donaldson, illus. by Axel Scheffler	The Snail and the Whale	Macmillan Children's Books	Winner
2005	Baby Book	Lara Jones	Poppy Cat's Farm	Campbell Books	Winner
2005	Baby Book	John Butler	Can You Cuddle Like a Koala?	Little Orchard	Shortlist
2005	Baby Book	Tony Maddox	Not So Loud, Oliver!	Little Orchard	Shortlist
2005	Baby Book	Joanne Partis	Look at Me!	Chrysalis Books	Shortlist
2005	Baby Book	Nicola Smee	No Bed Without Ted	Bloomsbury	Shortlist
2005	Baby Book	DK Team	Bathtime Peekaboo!	Dorling Kindersley	Shortlist
2005	New Illustrator	Kanako Usui	The Fantastic Mr Wani	Little Tiger Press	Winner
2005	New Illustrator	Heather Allen, written by Alec Sillifant	Little Green Monsters	Meadowside	Shortlist
2005	New Illustrator	Uwe Mayer, written by Rachel Elliot	Eric the Liontamer	Meadowside	Shortlist
2005	New Illustrator	Rob Scotton	Russell the Sheep	HarperCollins Children's	Shortlist
2005	Pre-School	Jack Tickle	The Very Dizzy Dinosaur	Little Tiger Press	Winner
2005	Pre-School	Jez Alborough	Duck's Key Where Can it be?	HarperCollins Children's	Shortlist
2005	Pre-School	Caroline Jayne Church	Pond Goose	Oxford University Press	Shortlist
2005	Pre-School	Atsuko Morozumi	My Friend Gorilla	Mathew Price Books	Shortlist
2005	Pre-School	Jan Ormerod and Lindsey Gardiner	Doing the Animal Bop	Oxford University Press	Shortlist
2005	Pre-School	Kaye Umansky and Chris Fisher	A Chair for Baby Bear	Oxford University Press	Shortlist
2006	Baby Book	Mandy Stanley	How Do You Feel?	HarperCollins Children's	Winner
2006	Baby Book	Marie Birkinshaw and Kate Merritt	Night, Night, Baby	Ladybird	Shortlist
2006	Baby Book	Kathy Henderson and Paul Howard	Look at You!	Walker Books	Shortlist
2006	Baby Book	Annie Kubler	Peek-a-Boo!	Child’s Play	Shortlist
2006	Baby Book	Luana Rinaldo	Clackety-Clacks: Bee	Campbell Books	Shortlist
2006	Baby Book	Fiona Watt and Catherine-Anne MacKinnon	Sleepy Baby	Usborne	Shortlist
2006	Emerging Illustrator	Catherine Rayner	Augustus and His Smile	Little Tiger Press	Winner
2006	Emerging Illustrator	Sebastien Braun	I Love My Mummy	Boxer Books	Shortlist
2006	Emerging Illustrator	Petra Brown, written by Beth Shoshan	If Big Can... I Can	Meadowside	Shortlist
2006	Emerging Illustrator	Natalie Chivers, written by Peter Dixon	Dad’s Bug Bear	Red Fox	Shortlist
2006	Pre-School	Sam Lloyd	Mr. Pusskins	Orchard Books	Winner
2006	Pre-School	Jonathan Allen	I'm Not Cute!	Boxer Books	Shortlist
2006	Pre-School	Nick Butterworth	Tiger	HarperCollins Children's	Shortlist
2006	Pre-School	Emma Dodd	What Pet to Get?	Templar Publishing	Shortlist
2006	Pre-School	Emily Gravett	Orange Pear Apple Bear	Macmillan Children's Books	Shortlist
2006	Pre-School	Oliver Jeffers	Lost and Found	HarperCollins Children's	Shortlist
2006	Baby Book	Jess Stockham	Tucking In!	Child's Play	Winner
2006	Baby Book	David McKee	Elmer’s First Counting Book	Andersen Press	Shortlist
2006	Baby Book	Justine Smith and Fiona Land	Baby Touch: Noisy Book	Ladybird	Shortlist
2006	Baby Book	Justine Smith and Fiona Land	Baby Touch: Peekaboo Book	Ladybird	Shortlist
2006	Baby Book	Jess Stockham	Looking Good!	Child’s Play	Shortlist
2006	Baby Book	Miriam Stoppard	Happy Baby	Dorling Kindersley	Shortlist
2007	Emerging Illustrator	Emily Gravett	Monkey and Me	Macmillan Children's Books	Winner
2007	Emerging Illustrator	Jason Chapman	Ted, Bo and Diz: The First Adventure	Little Tiger Press	Shortlist
2007	Emerging Illustrator	Viviane Schwarz	Timothy and the Strong Pyjamas	Alison Green Books	Shortlist
2007	Emerging Illustrator	Anna Wadham, written by Andrew Fusek Peters	The Andrew Fusek Peters	Child’s Play	Shortlist
2007	Pre-School	Polly Dunbar	Penguin	Walker Books	Winner
2007	Pre-School	Mara Bergman and Nick Maland	Oliver Who Would Not Sleep	Hodder Children’s Books	Shortlist
2007	Pre-School	Emma Chichester Clark	Eliza and the Moonchild	Andersen Press	Shortlist
2007	Pre-School	Cressida Cowell and Neal Layton	That Rabbit Belongs to Emily Brown	Orchard Books	Shortlist
2007	Pre-School	Joel Stewart	Dexter Bexley and his Big Blue Beastie	Doubleday	Shortlist
2007	Pre-School	Jeanne Willis and Tony Ross	Grill Pan Eddy	Andersen Press	Shortlist
2008	Baby Book	Georgie Birkett	Is This My Nose?	Red Fox	Winner
2008	Baby Book	Angela Brooksbank	Baby's Very First Book: Day	Campbell Books	Shortlist
2008	Baby Book	Emily Hawkins and Emma Dodd	Amazing Baby: Rainbow Fun!	Templar	Shortlist
2008	Baby Book	Dawn Sirett and Rachael Parfitt	Baby Loves Peekaboo!	Dorling Kindersley	Shortlist
2008	Baby Book	Justine Smith and Fiona Land	Baby Touch: Playtime Book and DVD	Ladybird	Shortlist
2008	Baby Book	Tim Warnes and Jane Chapman	Daddy Hug	HarperCollins Children's	Shortlist
2008	Emerging Illustrator	Tim Hopgood	Here Comes Frankie!	Macmillan Children's Books	Winner
2008	Emerging Illustrator	Victoria Ball	That Yucky Love Thing	Gullane Children's Books	Shortlist
2008	Emerging Illustrator	Joe Berger	Bridget Fidget	Puffin Books	Shortlist
2008	Emerging Illustrator	Gwen Millward	The Bog Baby	Puffin Books	Shortlist
2008	Emerging Illustrator	Alex T. Smith	Eliot Jones, Midnight Superhero	Scholastic Children's Books	Shortlist
2008	Emerging Illustrator	Vicky White	Ape	Walker Books	Shortlist
2008	Pre-School	Jeanne Willis and Gwen Millward	The Bog Baby	Puffin Books	Winner
2008	Pre-School	David Bedford and Russell Julian	It's a George Thing!	Egmont Books	Shortlist
2008	Pre-School	Andy Cutbill and Russell Ayto	The Cow That Laid an Egg	HarperCollins Children's	Shortlist
2008	Pre-School	Joanna Harrison	Grizzly Dad	David Fickling Books	Shortlist
2008	Pre-School	Chris Riddell	Wendel's Workshop	Macmillan Children's Books	Shortlist
2008	Pre-School	Jeanne Willis and Garry Parsons	There's An Ouch in My Pouch!	Puffin Books	Shortlist
2009	Baby Book	Ed Vere	Chick	Puffin Books	Winner
2009	Emerging Illustrator	Katie Cleminson	Box of Tricks	Jonathan Cape	Winner
2009	Pre-School	Mara Bergman and Nick Maland	Oliver Who Travelled Far and Wide	Hodder Children's Books	Winner
2010	Baby Book	Giles Andreae	I Love My Mummy	Orchard Books	Winner
2010	Emerging Illustrator	Levi Pinfold	The Django	Templar	Winner
2010	Pre-School	Chris Wormell	One Smart Fish	Red Fox	Winner
