= Crebbin =

Crebbin is a surname. Notable people with the surname include:

- Bill Crebbin (1869–1924), Australian rules footballer
- June Crebbin (born 1938) British writer for children
- Philip Crebbin (born 1951), British sailor
- Tom Crebbin (born 1964), Australian rules footballer
