= Philippa Fisher and the Dream-Maker's Daughter =

2009 novel by Liz Kessler

Philippa Fisher and the Dream Maker's Daughter
- First edition, 2009
- Author: Liz Kessler
- Illustrator: Katie May
- Series: Philippa Fisher
- Genre: Children's fantasy
- Publisher: Orion Books
- Publication date: 7 May 2009
- Publication place: United Kingdom
- Media type: Print (hardcover, paperback)
- Pages: 227 pp (first ed.); 270 pp (1st U.S. ed.)
- ISBN: 1-84255-585-5
- OCLC: 310157014
- LC Class: PZ7.K4842 Pf 2009
- Preceded by: Philippa Fisher's Fairy Godsister
- Followed by: Philippa Fisher and the Stone Fairy's Promise

Philippa Fisher and the Dream Maker's Daughter is a children's fantasy novel written by Liz Kessler, author of the Emily Windsnap series, and illustrated by Katie May. It is the second book in the Philippa Fisher series, the first sequel to Philippa Fisher's Fairy Godsister (2008). It was published May 2009 in the UK by Orion Books. Candlewick Press published a US edition later that year.

== Plot summary ==
Philippa Fisher is lonely. She misses her fairy godsister, Daisy. While on vacation with her parents, she befriends a local girl, Robyn. Though she is excited to have a friend again, she cannot help feeling there is something strange about Robyn and her father.

Meanwhile, Daisy, who is hard at work on a new mission, misses Philippa as well, so she decides to break the rules and visit her friend. The girls are happy to be reunited, but things soon begin to go horribly wrong with Daisy's assignment. When all three girls find themselves in danger, Philippa must work quickly to save her friends and herself.
