= Vlad the Drac Returns =

- Author: Ann Jungman
- Language: English
- Publisher: Dragon Books
- Publication date: 1984

Vlad the Drac Returns (ISBN 9780583306591) is a book by Ann Jungman, and the sequel to Vlad the Drac. It was first published in 1984 by Dragon Books.
