= Matyelok Gibbs =

British actress (1932–2023)

- Born: Ann Matyelok Gibbs; 1 August 1932; Leatherhead, Surrey, England
- Died: 14 August 2023 (aged 91)
- Occupation: Actress
- Partner: Ursula Jones (1961–2023)

Ann Matyelok Gibbs (1 August 1932 – 14 August 2023) was a British actress. From 1973 to 1977, she was an artistic director for London's Unicorn Theatre.

== Career ==
Gibbs was involved with the Unicorn Theatre from the 1950s, and became artistic director in 1973. She was a character actor, and appeared in the West End in a play by Alan Ayckbourn, Ten Times Table, in 1978. She toured with the Royal Shakespeare Company.

== Personal life ==
In 1961, Gibbs began living with the actor Ursula Jones in Notting Hill. The couple lived in France for 23 years where they entered a civil partnership, and they later entered a civil partnership in Britain as well. Gibbs and Jones were known by their friends as "Puck and Ursie". Gibbs died on 14 August 2023.

== Filmography ==
- Lady Killers (1981)
- Victor/Victoria (1982)
- Secrets (1983)
- A Room with a View (1985)
- To Kill a Priest (1988)
- Erik the Viking (1989)
- Kafka (1991)
- Waterland (1992)
- When Pigs Fly (1993)
- Priest (1994)
- Jack and Sarah (1995)
- Crimetime (1996)
- Oscar and Lucinda (1997)
- Ever After (1998)
- Just Visiting (2001)
- And Now... Ladies and Gentlemen (2002)
- Fragile (2005)
- A Little Trip to Heaven (2005)
- Babel (2006)
- Copying Beethoven (2006)
- Pu-239 (2006)
- Miss Potter (2006)
- Harry Potter and the Deathly Hallows – Part 1 (2010)
- Your Highness (2011)
- Tinker Tailor Soldier Spy (2011)
- The Hundred-Foot Journey (2014)
