= The Witch's Children and the Queen =

2003 children's picture book by Ursula Jones

- First edition
- Author: Ursula Jones
- Illustrator: Russell Ayto
- Cover artist: Ayto
- Language: English
- Genre: Children's picture book
- Publisher: Orchard Books
- Publication date: March 2003
- Publication place: United Kingdom
- Pages: 32 pp (unpaged)
- ISBN: 978-1-84121-416-0
- OCLC: 59468345
- Preceded by: The Witch's Children

The Witch's Children and the Queen is a children's picture book written by Ursula Jones, illustrated by Russell Ayto, and published by Orchard Children's Books in 2003. It won the Nestlé Smarties Book Prize, ages category 0–5 years.

== Series ==
This is the second of three Witch's Children books created by Jones, perhaps better known as an actress, and Ayto. Ayto made the Greenaway Medal longlist as illustrator of the first one, The Witch's Children (Orchard, 2001). As of July 2013, it alone has a U.S. edition catalogued by the Library of Congress. There are editions in several other languages.

The Witch's Children Go to School (Orchard, November 2008) won the inaugural Roald Dahl Funny Prize, ages six and under.
