= Tony Maddox (author/illustrator) =

British artist and a writer of children's books

Tony Maddox is a British artist and a writer of children's books.

Maddox was born in Birmingham and worked there as a commercial artist in an advertising agency. His first book, Spike, the Sparrow who Couldn't Sing, was published in 1989. He followed this up with Fergus the Farmyard Dog, which sold well, leading to nine sequels. He has had twenty-one books published which have had worldwide sales and been translated into many languages.

His book Not So Loud, Oliver!, written with Martin Clunes, was shortlisted in the Baby Book category for the 2005 Booktrust Early Years Award.

== Personal life ==
Tony Maddox is married with four grown children, and lives in Worcestershire, England. His hobbies are painting and playing classical guitar.

== Publications ==
=== As author and illustrator ===
==== Standalone books ====
- Clown, Bear and Rabbit (2008)

==== Fergus the Farmyard Dog books ====
- Fergus the Farmyard Dog (1992)
- Fergus's Upside-Down Day (1995)
- Fergus's Big Splash (1996)
- Fergus and Marigold (1998)
- Fergus's Scary Night (2001)
- Fergus to the Rescue (2002)
- Fergus the Sea Dog (2004)
- Fergus's Secret (2005)
- Fergus in the Park (2006)
- Fergus Goes Quackers! (2009)
- Fergus and Marigolds' Walk in the Dark (2015)

==== Little Croc books ====
- Little Croc and Whale (2009)
- Little Croc and Bird (2008)
- Well Done, Little Croc! (2012)

==== Oliver Owl books ====
- Not So Loud, Oliver! (2004)
- Look Behind You, Oliver! (2008)

==== Spike the Sparrow books ====
- Spike: The Sparrow Who Couldn't Sing (1989)
- Spike's Best Nest (1997)

=== As illustrator ===
- Ducks Disappearing, written by Phyllis Reynolds Naylor (1997)
