= Liz Kessler =

English writer

Liz Kessler (born 15 October 1966) is an English writer of children's books, most notably a series about a half-mermaid named Emily Windsnap.

== Biography ==
Liz Kessler grew up in Southport in the North West of England, and has lived in Manchester and Cheshire. She lives in St Ives, Cornwall.

Liz Kessler studied English at Loughborough University, then did a teaching qualification at Keele University, and more recently did a Masters in Creative Writing at Manchester Metropolitan University.

She has worked as a teacher, teaching English and Media Studies, and has also run Creative Writing courses. Liz was also a journalist working on local and regional newspapers in both York and Manchester.

She did a brief interview with the BBC about creative writing. She is represented by the Felicity Bryan Literary Agency, and her books are published by Orion Children's Books.

Her children's books are written at a level suitable for schoolchildren in grades 4 to 7. She has written Young Adult books suitable for older audiences (12+), such as Haunt me that addresses topics of suicide and depression.

Many of her books have been translated into German and her 2021 title When the World Was Ours was nominated for the 2023 Deutscher Jugendliteraturpreis by the youth jury.

== Emily Windsnap series ==
The Emily Windsnap series of children's novels features a 12-year-old girl who lives alone with her mother on a boat by the seaside. When Emily takes swimming lessons, she finds out something she did not know about herself. Emily is a semi-mer which means when fully immersed in water she has a mermaid's tail but when she is on land she has human legs. However, her mother appears to remember nothing about mermaids or even Emily's own father. Now Emily and her newly found friend Shona Silkfin embark on a trip through the mermaid realm to find out the truth about her, her father and mother, and the unusual Mr. Beeston, the lighthouse keeper.

The Emily Windsnap series was #10 on the New York Times Best Seller list for a new release in a children's series on 20 May 2007.

Now Liz Kessler has officially released 9 books in the Emily Windsnap series.

== Works ==
A Year Without Autumn was the first of three planned "stand alone" novels that "all deal in some way with time travel"; North of Nowhere was the second.

A Year Without Autumn was shortlisted for the Blue Peter Award in 2012.

- A Year Without Autumn (2011)
- North of Nowhere (2013)
- Has Anyone Seen Jessica Jenkins? (2015)
- Read Me Like a Book (2015)
- Haunt Me (2017)
- When the World was Ours (2021)
- Code name Kingfisher (2024)

Read Me Like a Book (2016) and Haunt Me were both nominated for the Kernow Youth Book Awards, Haunt Me won in 2018.

=== Emily Windsnap ===
The Emily Windsnap books are published by Orion Children's Books in the U.K., by Candlewick Press in the U.S. The first two are illustrated by Sarah Gibb, who continues to provide the cover art. The third to fifth books are illustrated by Natacha Ledwidge.

- The Tail of Emily Windsnap (2003)
- Emily Windsnap and the Monster from the Deep (2004)
- Emily Windsnap and the Castle in the Mist (2006)
- Emily Windsnap and the Siren's Secret (2010)
- Emily Windsnap and the Land of the Midnight Sun (2012)
- Emily Windsnap and the Ship of Lost Souls (2015), illustrated by Gibb and Ledwidge
- Emily Windsnap and the Falls of the Forgotten Island (2018)
- Emily Windsnap and the Pirate Prince (2019)
- Emily Windsnap and the Tides of Time (2020)

=== Philippa Fisher ===
The Philippa Fisher books are illustrated by Katie May.

- Philippa Fisher's Fairy Godsister (2008)
- Philippa Fisher and the Dream-Maker's Daughter (2009)
- Philippa Fisher and the Stone Fairy's Promise (2010); US title omits "Stone"

=== Poppy the Pirate Dog ===
Illustrated by Mike Phillips and published by Orion.

- Poppy the Pirate Dog (2012) OCLC 778327224
- Poppy the Pirate Dog's New Shipmate (2013)
- Poppy the Pirate Dog and the Missing Treasure (2015)
