= Penguin (book) =

Book by Polly Dunbar

- Author: Polly Dunbar
- Illustrator: Polly Dunbar
- Language: English
- Genre: Children's
- Publisher: Walker Books
- Publication date: 4 June 2007
- Publication place: United Kingdom
- Pages: unpaginated (32)
- ISBN: 978-1-84428-065-0
- OCLC: 85691861

Penguin is a 2007 children's picture book by Polly Dunbar. It is about a boy who receives a penguin as a present and how they interact.

== Reception ==
Penguin has been favourably reviewed, with Kirkus Reviews writing: "Visually, Ben’s contortions and Lion’s aplomb hearken back to early Sendak. While it’s at first unclear whether the immutable Penguin is a stuffed toy, a pet or something else entirely, kids will know—by story’s end at the very latest—that this bird’s a friend. An attractively designed, child-appealing package.". Publishers Weekly found Dunbar’s "winsome mixed media illustrations carry the day in a story that pulls a few punches on readers", while Common Sense Media described it as a "charming, whimsical boy-meets-bird tale."

Penguin has been translated into many different languages. Walker Books published a 10th anniversary edition in 2017.

Penguin won the Nestlé Children's Book Prize Silver Award, the Red House Children's Book Award for Younger Children and a Booktrust Early Years Award. It was also shortlisted for the Kate Greenaway Medal, and was selected by The Sunday Times as one of the best books of 2007 for children 0 to 3 year olds.

== Adaption ==
Penguin has been adapted for the stage, has played at the Edinburgh Fringe Festival and received positive reviews.
