= Eoin Mclaughlin =

Irish children's writer

Eoin McLaughlin
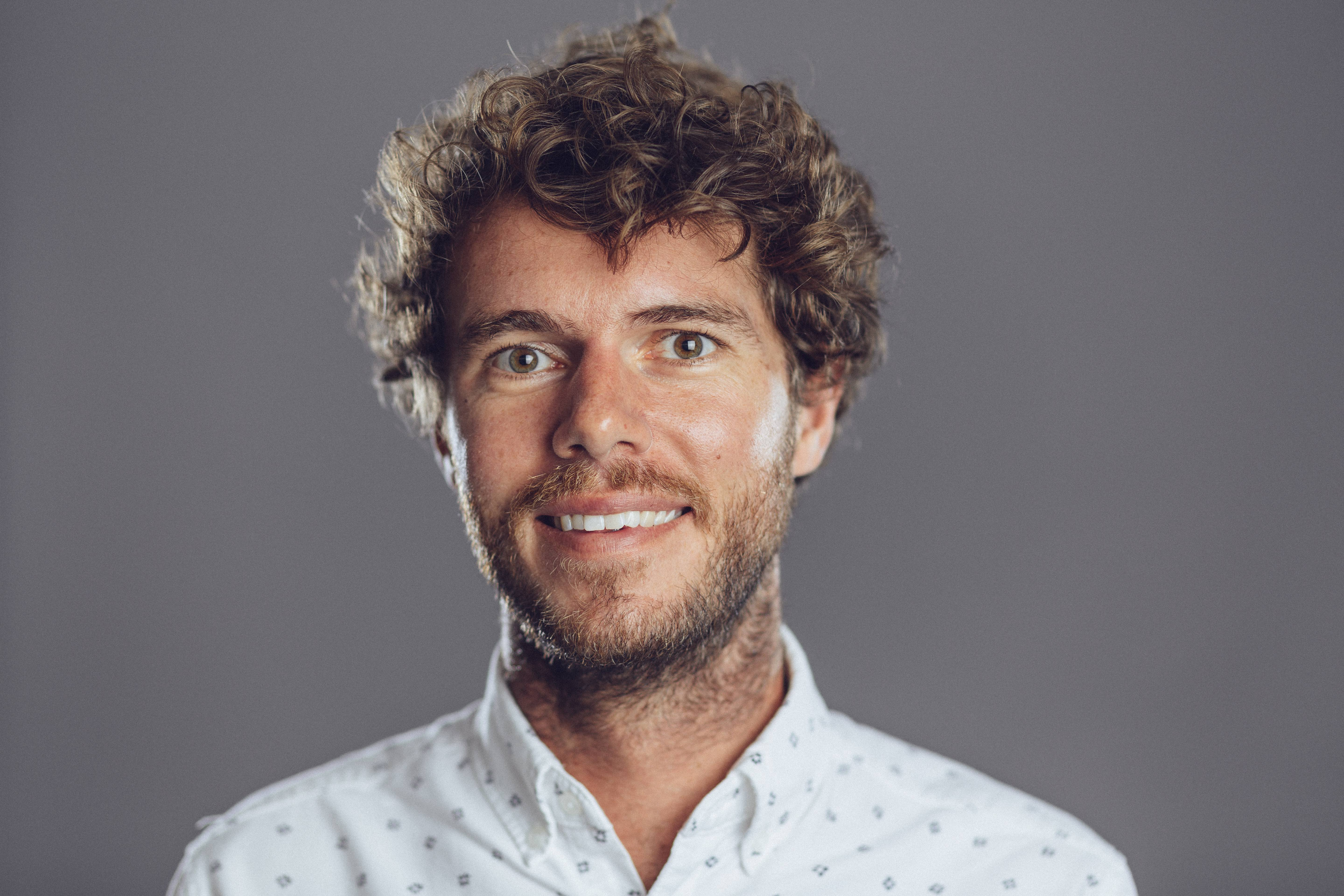
- Eoin Mclaughlin smiling awkwardly
- Born: Dublin, Ireland
- Occupation: Writer
- Children: 1
- Writing career
- Genre: Children's fiction
- Notable works: The Hug; While We Can't Hug; Goodnight Sun
- Website: www.eoinmclaughlin.com

Eoin McLaughlin is a Sunday Times bestselling Irish author. His books have been translated into over 30 languages and described by The Times as "an important historical record of the time".

== Children's Books ==
His debut picture book The Hug (illustrated by Polly Dunbar) was named a 'Book of the Year' by The Guardian and shortlisted for the CBI Book of the Year Awards. It has been translated into over 25 languages.

The follow-up While We Can't Hug has been widely used around the world to help children during the COVID-19 lockdowns. It was shortlisted for the Irish Book Awards and nominated for the Carnegie Medal. It was also included in The Guardian's 'Children's Books of the Year' and read by Mr Tumble on the BBC on Christmas Day.

The Longer the Wait, the Bigger the Hug came out in June 2021, followed by The Roar and Merry Whatmas, which was named one of the top picture books of 2023.

Secret Agent Elephant is illustrated by Ross Collins and published by Hachette Book Group. Their second book, Inspector Penguin, has "a plot worthy of Agatha Christie" according to The Guardian.

The Case of the Missing Cake is illustrated by Marc Boutavant and published by Walker Books. It featured in The Guardian's best new children's books of the month.

== Channel 4 ==
McLaughlin is a creative director at Channel 4, where he has worked on Complaints Welcome, Taskmaster, Derry Girls, The Great British Bake Off and the Paralympics for which he won the Cannes Lions International Festival of Creativity Grand Prix.

== Biography ==
McLaughlin was born in Dublin and now lives in Mauritius with his partner and their son.

== Bibliography ==
- The Hug (illustrated by Polly Dunbar) Faber 2019. ISBN 0571350607
- Secret Agent Elephant (illustrated by Ross Collins) Hachette 2019. ISBN 1408354233
- The Case of the Missing Cake (illustrated by Marc Boutavant) Walker 2020. ISBN 1406372129
- This is NOT a Bedtime Story (illustrated by Robert Starling) Pavilion 2020. ISBN 1843654385
- While We Can't Hug (illustrated by Polly Dunbar) Faber 2020 ISBN 0571365604
- The Longer the Wait, the Bigger the Hug (illustrated by Polly Dunbar) Faber 2021 ISBN 9780571370382
- The Roar (illustrated by Polly Dunbar) Faber ISBN 978-0-571-37436-6
- I Am Not an Octopus (illustrated by Marc Boutavant) Walker 2023 ISBN 978-1-5295-1100-0
- Merry Whatmas? (illustrated by Polly Dunbar) Faber ISBN 978-0-571-37951-4
- Goodnight Sun (illustrated by Morag Hood) Faber 2024 ISBN 978-0-571-37752-7
- I, Rock (illustrated by Mark Chambers) Harper Collins ISBN 978-0-00-877184-3
