= Vlad the Drac =

1982 novel by Ann Jungman

- Author: Ann Jungman
- Illustrator: George Thompson
- Genre: Fiction
- Publisher: 1982 (Collins)
- Followed by: Vlad the Drac Returns

Vlad the Drac is a 1982 children's novel by author Ann Jungman. The story revolves around the life of a baby vampire who comes into the lives of two siblings, who take him home to England and eventually grow to love and care for him like their own son.

It was followed by five sequels: Vlad the Drac Returns, Vlad the Drac Superstar, Vlad the Drac Vampire, Vlad the Drac Down Under, and Vlad the Drac Goes Travelling.

== Story ==
Paul and Judy Stone, along with their parents, are on a coach tour in the mountains of Romania. As they play in the snow, they discover a baby vampire who was asleep underneath a stone Paul fell on. Astonished that the vampire is harmless and fluent in English, Paul and Judy learn that the vampire is in fact a vegetarian who faints at the sight of blood. Before the coach can leave, the vampire begs Paul and Judy to take him with them, which they reluctantly do.

After the coach arrives at their hotel, Paul and Judy hide the vampire from their parents, and immediately think up a name for their new friend: Vlad, which the vampire happily accepts. Vlad also reveals that he has a strange diet, which includes a love for certain chemicals like washing-up liquid and bars of soap. Paul, Judy and Vlad safely arrive back in England without revealing Vlad to their parents. But looking after Vlad brings many problems, such as Paul and Judy having to spend most of their pocket money on soap and washing-up liquid.

After returning home from school one day, while their parents are still out (Mr Stone is a violinist, and Mrs Stone is a doctor), Paul and Judy find that Vlad has been up to mischief, especially after they forbade him to explore the house while they were out. They find the kitchen covered in blood, and a proud Vlad tells them that he has apparently devoured the Milkman, the Window Cleaner and Gasman. Paul and Judy panic, until they find a broken bottle of tomato ketchup in the bin. Furious at Vlad, Paul and Judy shut him up in Judy's room for a day.

After seeing the television schedule on Friday, Vlad notices a film entitled The Curse of the Vampire, which he begs the children to allow him to watch. Luckily, the parents are going out that evening, which allows them to watch the movie and go to bed before they return. However, when the scary scenes of the film start, Vlad hides under a pillow, unable to watch any longer, and begs the children to take him to bed. That night, Vlad comes to Judy and complains about a nightmare he had about the film. Judy allows Vlad to sleep with her.

One day, after Paul and Judy come home early due to bad weather, Vlad learns to fly, much to his delight. Then, Mr Stone comes home with a box of ice cream and two tickets to a football match, to which he is going to take Paul. But after Mr Stone is out of earshot, Vlad begs Paul to take him to the football match, and Paul accepts.

However, on the day of the match, Mr Stone and Paul come home earlier than expected, beaten and battered. Paul appears to be in very deep trouble for bad behaviour, when in secret it was Vlad who unintentionally got Paul into trouble by using racist language with a group of Scotsmen, and shouting "Up the Arsenal". While Paul and Vlad's friendship appears to have ended, Judy speaks to Paul and asks him to give Vlad another chance. Reluctantly, Paul forgives Vlad.

It's Christmas time, and Paul and Judy are preparing for the celebrations. By now, Paul has long been forgiven by his father. For Christmas, Paul and Judy get a puppy, and Vlad gets a book titled The Dracula Legend, although he is still scared of the puppy.

During the holidays, Gran and Aunt Margot (Mrs Stone's mother and sister) come to visit, but both get mysteriously bitten on the ankle. Immediately deducing that the puppy is the culprit, Mr Stone and Paul take the puppy back to the pet shop, but Judy knows that Vlad was behind it, and he confesses, claiming that eventually the puppy would have harmed or killed him.

Almost a year has passed since the trip to Romania, and Judy decides to take Vlad to school with her one-day, under the condition that he stay silent. But in a classroom, when the teacher, Miss Fairfax, notices Judy writing an essay about vampires, she starts to knock the subject down by telling Judy that vampires don't exist. Too much for him to handle, Vlad flies onto the desk and scolds Miss Fairfax, causing her to faint. Judy and Paul now realise that their secret has come to an end, for their parents are surely going to find out.

That evening, Mr and Mrs Stone receive a phone call from the school headmaster about Vlad, which Mr Stone angrily scoffs, but decides to ask the children anyway. Then, it happens: Vlad finally reveals himself to Mr and Mrs Stone, who are shocked but fascinated to meet the friendly little vampire. Mrs Stone then makes a plan with Vlad to make him famous: which would consist of Vlad returning to Romania and allowing many people to visit him. Excited, Vlad packs his things straight away.

The day of Vlad's departure arrives, and he leaves for Romania after bidding farewell to his friends.

Two years later, the Stones re-visit Romania, and find that Vlad is now living in Count Dracula's castle, has met a female vampire (Mrs Vlad), and started a family, naming his children after his loved ones (his first daughter named Judy; his first son named Paul; his second daughter named Mum; his second son named Dad; and his third son named Ghitza). They also see that Vlad's piano running skills have improved, now that he knows how to play Chopin's Revolutionary, a piece Mr Stone never learned.
