= Sarah Gibb =

British children's illustrator

Sarah Gibb is an English illustrator and author, predominantly of children's books. Her best known books are adaptations of fairytales, both as an illustrator and an author.

Her drawings have also appeared in national newspapers, magazines, and greetings cards. She studied at London's St. Martin's College before completing an MA in Sequential Illustration at Brighton College of Art.

== Career ==
Gibb has illustrated three picture books by Ursula Jones—a retired British actress and the surviving sister of Diana Wynne Jones, published by Orchard Books. The Princess Who Had No Kingdom was published in 2009, and was translated into French, Spanish, Dutch and Japanese. It's been described as a book "for parents who are really sick of princess books". It was followed by a sequel, The Princess Who Had No Fortune, and subsequently a retelling of Beauty and the Beast. Gibb's "lacy" black and white silhouettes and gold, foiled covers were noted in reviews.

She has illustrated at least a dozen books in The Tiara Club series by Vivian French, which carry titles such as Princess Alice and the Glass Slipper, and Princess Charlotte and the Birthday Ball. (The Library of Congress catalogues 12 volumes featuring 6 named princesses with U.S. editions released in 2007.)

Gibb's first book as both author and illustrator was a traditional retelling of Grimms' Rapunzel, published by HarperCollins in 2011. In a NYT review, Pamela Paul drew attention to Gibb's dramatic silhouettes and "curlicued flourishes". Two more retellings followed: Sleeping Beauty and Cinderella, all published by HarperCollins.

She's illustrated a number of other authors' books, including the Emily Windsnap Series by Liz Kessler, and The Last Duchess by Laura Powell.

Turning again to fairytales, in 2017 Gibb illustrated Hilary McKay's Fairy Tales, which was longlisted for the Carnegie Medal. A sequel, Straw into Gold: Fairy Tales Re-Spun, followed in 2018. Both were published by Macmillan.
