= David Ellwand =

English photographer, illustrator, and author

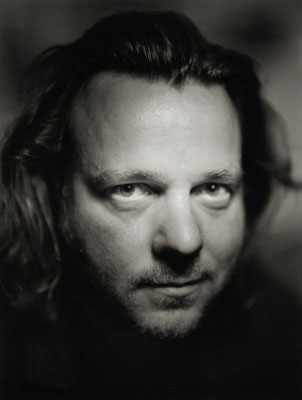
- Born: 1966 (age 59–60); Liverpool, England
- Education: Kitson College
- Occupations: author, photographer
- Spouse: Ruth Ellwand
- Children: 1
- Writing career
- Language: English
- Website: davidellwand.com

David Ellwand (born 1966) is an English photographer, illustrator, and author. He is a trained photographer, who has exhibited his landscape and abstract photographs throughout western Europe and the United States.

Ellwand is known for his photography on award-winning, best-selling fashion books for fairies, Fairie-ality: The Fashion Collection from the House of Ellwand and Fairie‐ality Style. He is also known for his award-winning Amazing Baby board book series for Templar Publishing, as well as the best-selling books Ten in a Bed, Teddy Bears, and Cinderlily. His other works have been published by the Penguin Group's Dutton Children's Books; HarperCollins (US); Chronicle Books; Templar Publishing; Baker & Taylor's Silver Dolphin Books; L'Ecole des Loisirs (France); and Moritz Verlag-GmbH (Germany). His target audience includes babies and children up to eight years of age.

== Personal background ==
David Ellwand was born in 1966, in Liverpool, England. He graduated from Kettlethorpe High School in 1984 and studied photography at Kitson College in Leeds, England. Ellwand is married to Ruth Huddleston. She is a former sales and marketing director with Templar Publishing. He used to work from a studio in an old converted church in Dorset, England but now lives in West Sussex with his wife and daughter, Lydia.

== Professional background ==
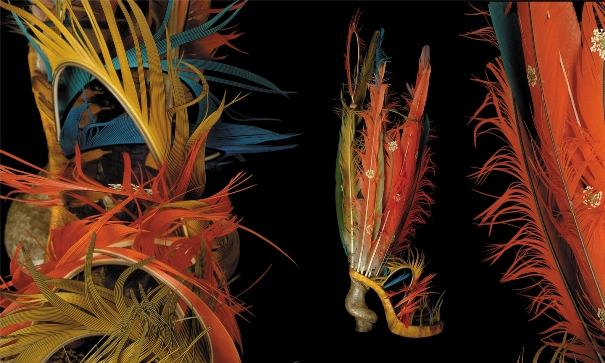
Icarean boot created using feather and wooden objects

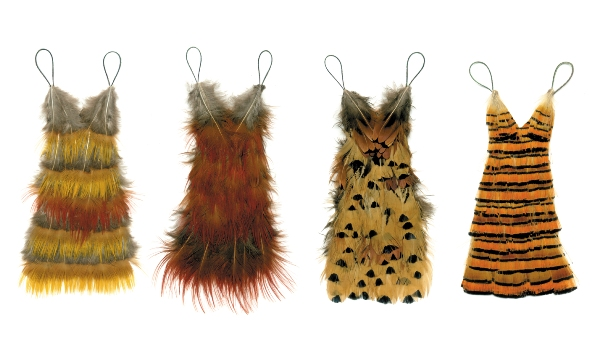
Four shift dresses created using objects from nature including feathers and flowers

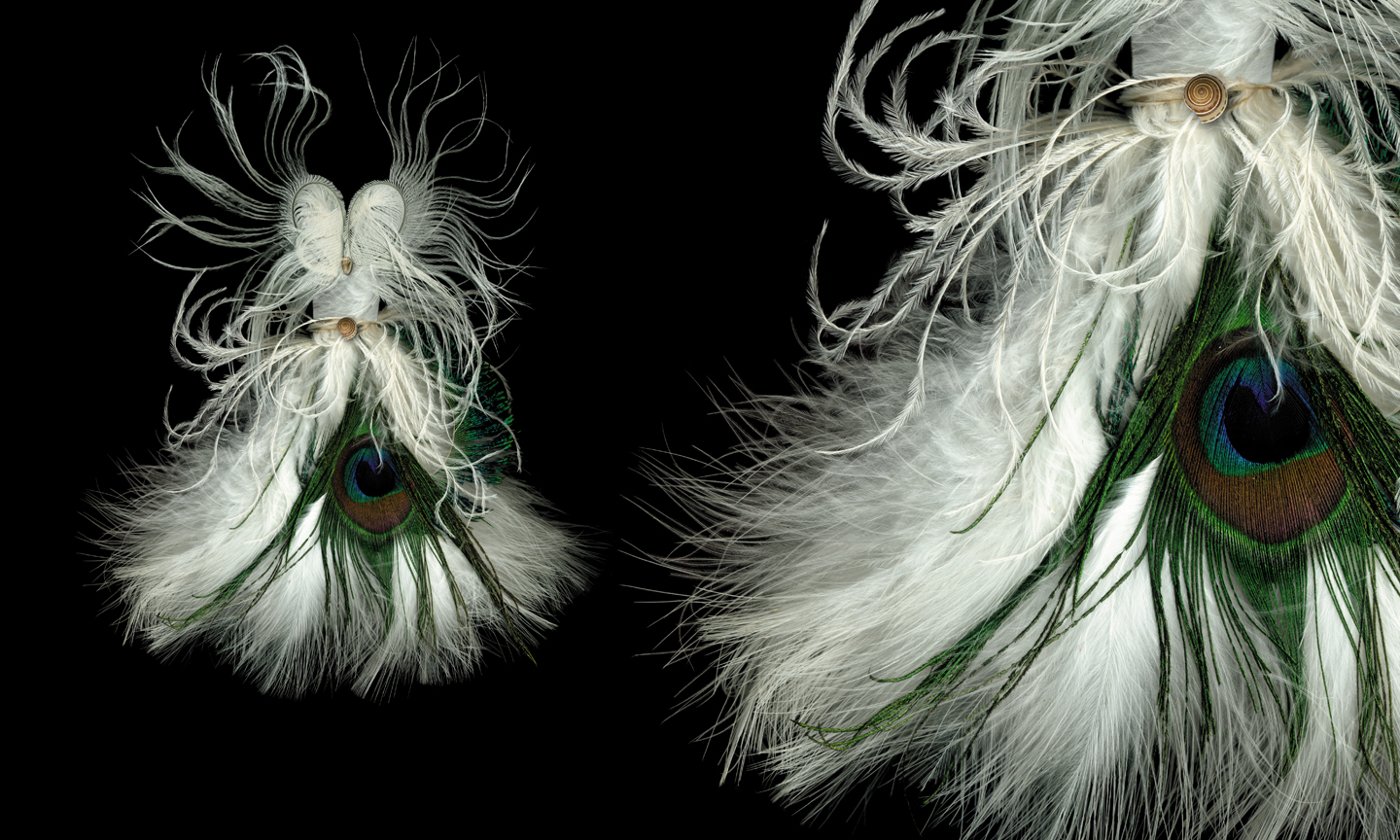
Couture dress created using peacock feathers

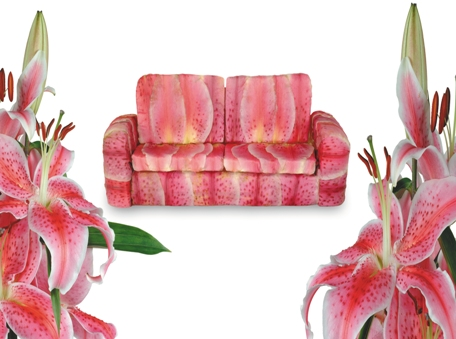
Sofa created using flower petals

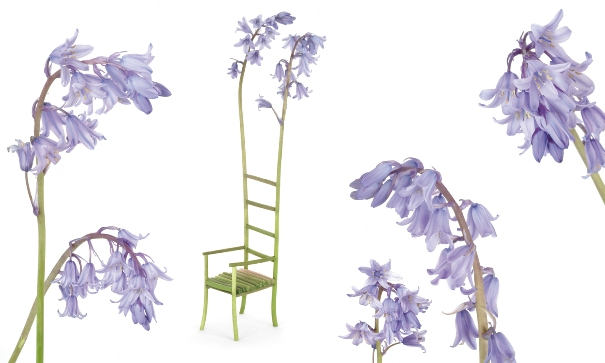
Chair created using bluebell flowers

David Ellwand began his career in photography at the age of 18. In 1991, he set up a photography studio, primarily focusing on producing commercial photography for advertising agencies. He later moved into book illustration and photography, using a variety of mixed media, formatting, and techniques. Several of his better known works include black-and-white photographs, as well as collage and mixed media using hand-tinted, full-colour photography, using natural items and household objects.

In April 2010, Ellwand was featured on the children's television programme, Blue Peter. He was commissioned to design and create a large wooden house out of a tree trunk for the fairies to live, in the Blue Peter Garden. The episode featured him showing the programme presenter, Andy Akinwolere, how to create a selection of small pieces of furniture for the house.

In 2011, Ellwand began working on a series of books based around the supernatural, experimenting with historical photographic processes, including wet collodion process. Drawn to the supernatural, he notes, "I've been to a lot of places where folklorists say that fairies have been sighted. Nowadays anything supernatural might be purported to be a UFO, but in Victorian times it would be considered to be a fairie, or a will-o'-the-wisp, or whatever. It's really quite fascinating."

=== Photography ===
Fairie-ality series

Ellwand's best-selling fashion books for fairies, Fairie-ality: The Fashion Collection from the House of Ellwand and Fairie‐ality Style, were published by Candlewick Press in 2002 and 2009. The book showcases 150 fashion designs created out of household items, as well as flowers, feathers, leaves, grass, shells, and material found in nature. Fashioned art pieces include dresses, coats, trousers, hats, undergarments, and shoes. The series was so successful that he was asked by Elle Magazine to create a gown for their Christmas issue. Shoe designer Stuart Weitzman, commissioned eight almost-human-sized "fairie" shoes for a window display making the round of his boutiques. In 2003, Madame Alexander dolls created a Fairie-ality doll and trunk set. In 2004, Cedco Publishing manufactured two journals, based on the Fairie-ality series.

- Bird, Eugenie; Downton, David (illustrator); and Ellwand, David (photographer). Fairie-ality: The Fashion Collection from the House of Ellwand, Candlewick Press, 2002. ISBN 978-0-7636-1413-3
- Fairie-ality Journal: Feather Fairie Dress, Cedco Publishing, 2004. ISBN 978-0-7683-2630-7
- Fairie-ality Bound 6x8 Journal, Cedco Publishing, 2004. ISBN 978-0-7683-2629-1
- Fairie‐ality Style: A Sourcebook of Inspirations from Nature, Candlewick Press, 2009. ISBN 978-0-7636-2095-0

Baby Unique series

- Baby Unique, Candlewick Press, 2005. ISBN 978-0-7636-2606-8
- Baby Unique Moments: A Record Book, Candlewick Press, 2006. ISBN 978-0-7636-3091-1

Amazing Baby Series

- Amazing Baby: I Love You!, Silver Dolphin Books, 2004. ISBN 978-1-59223-232-1
- Amazing Baby: Baby, Boo!, Silver Dolphin Books, 2006. ISBN 978-1-59223-585-8
- Amazing Baby: Twinkle, Twinkle!, Silver Dolphin Books, 2006. ISBN 978-1-59223-586-5
- Amazing Baby: Baby's Day!, Silver Dolphin Books, 2006. ISBN 978-1-59223-588-9
- Amazing Baby: Peekaboo, Puppy!, Silver Dolphin Books, 2006. ISBN 978-1-59223-587-2
- Amazing Baby: Hello Baby!, Silver Dolphin Books, 2006. ISBN 978-1-59223-701-2
- Amazing Baby: Go, Baby, Go!, Silver Dolphin Books, 2006. ISBN 978-1-59223-625-1
- Amazing Baby: Yum-Yum, Baby!, Silver Dolphin Books, 2007. ISBN 978-1-59223-803-3
- Amazing Baby: Spots and Dots!, Silver Dolphin Books, 2007. ISBN 978-1-59223-597-1
- Amazing Baby: Night-Night, Baby!, Silver Dolphin Books, 2007. ISBN 978-1-59223-802-6
- Amazing Baby: Picture Pairs!, Silver Dolphin Books, 2007. ISBN 978-1-59223-596-4
- Amazing Baby: Rainbow Fun!, Silver Dolphin Books, 2008. ISBN 978-1-59223-905-4
- Amazing Baby: Five Little Ducks!, Silver Dolphin Books, 2008. ISBN 978-1-59223-904-7

Retro Photo

- Retro Photo: An Obsession: A Personal Selection of Vintage Cameras and the Photographs They Take, Old Barn Studio, an imprint of Old Barn Books, UK, 2015. ISBN 978-1910646090 And Candlewick Studio, an imprint of Candlewick Press, US/Can, 2016. ISBN 978-0763692506

=== Illustration ===
- Ellwand, David (illustrator). Jingle Bells (Teddy Bear Sing-Along), Silver Dolphin Books, 2011. ISBN 978-1-60710-322-6
- Ellwand, David (illustrator). Teddy Time (Book and Stacking Boxes), Silver Dolphin Books, 2011. ISBN 978-1-60710-259-5

=== Authored works ===
Children's books

- Ellwand, David. Beaucoup de beaux bébés, L'Ecole des Loisirs, 1995. ISBN 978-2-211-03121-9
- Ellwand, David. Baby strahlt, Baby weint, Moritz Verlag-GmbH, 1997. ISBN 978-3-89565-057-4
- Ellwand, David. Emma's Elephant: And Other Favorite Animal Friends, Dutton Children's Books, 1997. ISBN 978-0-525-45792-3
- Ellwand, David. Alfred's Camera: A Collection of Picture Puzzles , Dutton Children's Books, 1999. ISBN 978-0-525-45978-1
- Ellwand, David. Alfred's Party: A Collection of Picture Puzzles, Dutton Children's Books, 2000. ISBN 0-525-46385-2
- Ellwand, David; Ellwand, Ruth; Ellwand, David (photography). Midas Mouse, HarperCollins Children's Books, 2000. ISBN 978-0-688-16745-5
- Ellwand, David. Ten in the Bed, Advanced Marketing, 2002. ISBN 978-1-903938-27-0
- Ellwand, David. Clap your Hands, Chronicle Books, 2002. ISBN 1-929766-50-5
- Ellwand, David; and Steer, Dugald. Tickle Teddy: A Touch-and-Feel Book, Chronicle Books, 2002. ASIN B001HUD77U
- Ellwand, David; Moore, Clement Clarke; and Steer, Dugald. Santa Ted, Chronicle Books, 2003. ISBN 978-1-59354-004-3
- Ellwand, David; Tagg, Christine; Ellwand, David (photography). Metal Mutz!, Candlewick Press, 2003. ISBN 0-7636-2083-1
- Ellwand, David; Tagg, Christine; Ellwand, David (photography). Cinderlily: A Floral Fairy Tale, Candlewick Press, 2003. ISBN 978-0-7636-2328-9
- Ellwand, David. The Big Book of Beautiful Babies, Ragged Bears Publishing, 2005. ISBN 978-1-85714-182-5
- Ellwand, David; Ellwand, Ruth; Ellwand, David (photography). The Mystery of the Fool and the Vanisher, Candlewick Press, 2008. ISBN 0-7636-2096-3
- Ellwand, David. Wheels on the Bus, Silver Dolphin Books, 2010. ISBN 978-1-60710-103-1
- Ellwand, David. Old Macdonald, Silver Dolphin Books, 2010. ISBN 978-1-60710-104-8
- Ellwand, David. Row, Row, Row Your Boat (Teddy Bear Sing-Along), Silver Dolphin Books, 2011. ISBN 978-1-60710-159-8
- Ellwand, David. Head, Shoulders, Knees, and Toes (Teddy Bear Sing-Along), Silver Dolphin Books, 2011. ISBN 978-1-60710-321-9

Boasting series

- Ellwand, David. Perfect Pets Boasting Book, Ragged Bears Publishing, 1997. ISBN 978-1-85714-133-7
- Ellwand, David. Gorgeous Grandchildren Boasting Book, Ragged Bears Publishing, 2005. ISBN 978-1-85714-057-6
- Ellwand, David. Beautiful Babies Boasting Book, Ragged Bears Publishing, 2005. ISBN 978-1-85714-058-3
- Ellwand, David. D. E. Mummy's Boasting Book, Ragged Bears Publishing, 2005. ISBN 978-1-85714-091-0
- Ellwand, David. My Boasting Book D.E., Ragged Bears Publishing, 2005. ISBN 978-1-85714-142-9
- Ellwand, David. Daddy's Boasting Book, Ragged Bears Publishing, 2005. ISBN 978-1-85714-092-7
- Ellwand, David. Granny's Boasting Book, Ragged Bears Publishing, 2005. ISBN 978-1-85714-093-4
- Ellwand, David. Grandpa's Boasting Book, Ragged Bears Publishing, 2005. ISBN 978-1-85714-094-1
- Ellwand, David. Great-Granny's Boasting Book, Ragged Bears Publishing, 2005. ISBN 978-1-85714-085-9
- Ellwand, David. Great-Grandpa's Boasting Book, Ragged Bears Publishing, 2005. ISBN 978-1-85714-086-6

== Honors and awards ==
- 2003: British Book Awards' Stora Enso Design and Production Award for Fairie-ality, the Fashion Collection from The House of Ellwand
- 2002: American Booksellers Association's Book Sense 76 Selection for Fairie-ality, the Fashion Collection from The House of Ellwand
- 2002: Hong Kong Print Awards' Best Printed Book Prize for Fairie-ality, the Fashion Collection from The House of Ellwand
- 2002: American Library Association's Best Book for Young Adults for Fairie-ality, the Fashion Collection from The House of Ellwand
- 2003: New England Book Show's Best of Show for Fairie-ality, the Fashion Collection from The House of Ellwand
- 2003: New England Book Show's Best Book Manufacturing for Fairie-ality, the Fashion Collection from The House of Ellwand
- 2004: Booktrust Early Years Awards' Baby Book Award for I Love You!
- 2010: New England Book Show's Best Pictorial Book for Fairie-ality Style: A Sourcebook of Inspirations from Nature
- 2010: Printing Industries of America's Benny Award for Fairie-ality Style: A Sourcebook of Inspirations from Nature
