= Greenclaws =

British children's TV series

- Genre: Children's television series
- Written by: Ursula Jones
- Starring: Nick Mercer, Stella Goodier
- Theme music composer: Jonathan Cohen
- Country of origin: United Kingdom
- Original language: English
- No. of series: 2
- No. of episodes: 26

Production
- Producer: Christine Hewitt
- Running time: 15 mins

Original release
- Network: BBC Two
- Release: 3 January 1989 – 6 February 1990

Greenclaws is a children's television series aired on the BBC between 3 January 1989 and 6 February 1990. It starred Nick Mercer and Stella Goodier, was written by Ursula Jones, directed by Adrian Mills (not to be confused with That's Life! host Adrian Mills), and produced by Christine Hewitt.

== Content ==
Greenclaws, played by Nick Mercer, was a big green monster who lived in a greenhouse. Every week, Iris (Stella Goodier) would visit Greenclaws. They would put one of Greenclaws' fabulous seeds in a plant pot, put the plant pot inside a secret growing place in the Riddle Tree, wait for Owlma (a mechanical owl) to alert them that the plant was ready, answer three riddles/questions correctly from Owlma (which were always along the lines of "Twit twoo, twoo, twit twit twoo?" and then translated into English by Iris for her and Greenclaws to solve), then open the tree to find the plant had grown into something bearing unusual fruit. Each episode featured a song filmed (lip-synched) on location, most of which were written by Hilary James and Simon Mayor. There would also be a story told featuring relatives of Greenclaws while the plant was growing, accompanied by illustrations.

== Broadcast ==
Only one series of Greenclaws was produced – reportedly due to the fact that some young pre-schoolers at which the series was aimed, were frightened by Greenclaws's appearance, regardless of his gentle-natured persona. Despite this, the series was repeated several times, including in a later-afternoon Children's BBC slot, where a slightly older demographic audience less likely to be intimidated by Greenclaws' appearance would be watching.

== Theme ==
In the greenhouse, Greenclaws' greenhouse,
Greenclaws grows them amazing plants.
They're surprising, mystifying,
Greenclaws grows them crazy plants!

== Episodes ==
1. Gadgets, Cooking (14th February 1989): Greenclaws decides to go in for gadgets this week but they do not turn out to be as useful as he thought and when he decides to give Iris a pancake party he realises he is not such a great cook even though his Aunt Saucy Claws is a famous chef. The party is nearly ruined but Iris and Owlma save the day.
2. No Joke (21st February 1989): Poor old Green Claws is down in the dumps. No one comes to see him, his clothes are full of holes and his telephone plant is ill. Iris does her best to comfort him and has an idea but Green Claws takes matters into his own claws and makes himself another outfit.
3. Playtime, Cricket (7th March 1989)
4. Birthday (14th March 1989)
5. Play Up (21st March 1989)
6. Fancy Dress, Magic (28th March 1989)
7. Dancing (7th November 1989)
8. Flowers (21st November 1989)
9. Bad Day (28th November 1989)
10. Spring Clean (3rd August 1990)
11. Sleepless Night (21st January 1991)

== Notes ==
Owlma is meant to be a female owl. The "Twit Twoo" call is actually two owls calling to each other. The female calls out the "twit" sound to which a male owl answers with a call of "twoo".

== Reception ==
"The whole premise of the show was pretty bizarre, but for many 90′s kids, Greenclaws was their answer to Alan Titchmarsh.", commented retrospectively The Huffington Post. The Guardian characterised the show by its "melancholy".
