= Ursula Jones =

British author and actor

- Born: 1939 (age 86–87); St John's Wood, London, England
- Occupations: Actor, author
- Writing career
- Years active: 1963–present
- Genre: Children's fiction
- Notable work: The Witch's Children and the Queen
- Notable awards: Nestle Smarties Book Prize; Roald Dahl Funny Prize
- Website: www.ursulajones.co.uk

Ursula Jones is a British actor and author of children's fiction. Her picture book The Witch's Children and the Queen won a gold Nestlé Smarties Book Prize, and the sequel The Witch's Children Go to School won the inaugural Roald Dahl Funny Prize.

Her elder sister was the children's fantasy author, Diana Wynne Jones. After Diana Wynne Jones's death, Jones completed her unfinished manuscript, The Islands of Chaldea. The book was a finalist in the Mythopoeic Awards.

As an actor, she worked with Alan Ayckbourn, with the Royal Shakespeare Company, and briefly played Elsie Duckworth in Coronation Street.

== Early life ==
Jones grew up with her sisters Diana, an author, and Isobel, an academic. Evacuated during World War II, they ended up in the house in the Lake District which inspired Swallows and Amazons, Arthur Ransome's classic children's book.

== Career ==
=== Actor ===
Jones trained as an actor at RADA, graduating in 1959. She made her start as an actor with "weekly rep" (repertory theatre), performing a different play every night.

She joined the Unicorn Theatre for children in London in 1963, playing a range of parts. She wrote 17 plays herself with the company, with names like The Lion and the Unicorn Hullabaloo. They were performed to children in various London theatres and on tour.

In 1985, she was directed by Alan Ayckbourn in the premiere of his play Woman in Mind. She played the intense central character Susan, a parson's wife with an active fantasy life, at the Stephen Joseph Theatre. She also worked with the Royal Shakespeare Company, playing Emilia in The Comedy of Errors at the Young Vic and The Other Place. More recently she appeared at The Royal National Theatre, in a role she described as a “mad old granny”—presumably a reference to the role of Grandie, in a performance of Conor McPherson's The Veil.

On screen, Jones played Isabella in Ever After (a 1998 adaptation of Cinderella with Drew Barrymore), and Rebecca in the 1999 British mystery film Simon Magus. She briefly played Elsie Duckworth in the long running soap Coronation Street, Mrs Cutter in the 2003 TV adaptation of Lucky Jim, and appeared in episodes of The Bill and Sense8.

=== Writer ===
In 1988, Jones was commissioned to write a children's television series for the BBC, Greenclaws. It first aired in 1989, and starred a large green gardening monster.

=== Author ===
The Witch's Children, her first picture book, was published in 2001. Illustrated by Russell Ayto, it was shortlisted for the Kate Greenaway Medal. The sequel, The Witch's Children and the Queen, won a gold Nestlé Smarties Book Prize in 2003. The third and last book in the series The Witch's Children Go To School won the Roald Dahl Funny Prize in 2008—the first year the award ran. All three are illustrated by Ayto.

The Princess Who Had No Kingdom, a picture book illustrated by Sarah Gibb about a princess who marries a jester, was published in 2009. Two more books with Gibb followed, a sequel, The Princess Who Had No Fortune, and then a retelling of Beauty and the Beast. Jones wrote two more fairytale picture book retellings with different illustrators—Cinderella with Jessica Courtney-Tickle in 2018, and The Sleeping Beauty with Paola Escobar in 2021. All her picture books are published by Orchard Books.

She has also written novels for older children, including Dear Clare, My Ex Best Friend, The Lost King and The Youngstars, about a troupe of teenage performers.

When Diana Wynne Jones died in 2011, her last book — the children's fantasy novel The Islands of Chaldea — was unfinished. Jones, apparently at the suggestion of their family and Diana Wynne Jones's agent, agreed to complete it. She has described the planning and writing process as "curiously traumatic", and said finishing it was "an unbearable second parting from her: as if she had died again". Jones said she attempted to erase her own writing style, and critics and the book's publishers have said they were unable to work out where Diana Wynne Jones's portion of the book ended and Jones's began. The book was published by Greenwillow in the U.S and HarperCollins in the UK. It was a finalist for the Mythopoeic Awards in 2015.

== Personal life ==
In 1961, Jones began living with the actor Ann Matyelok Gibbs in Notting Hill. The couple lived in France for 23 years where they entered a civil partnership, and they later entered a civil partnership in Britain as well. Jones and Gibbs were known by their friends as "Puck and Ursie". Gibbs died on 14 August 2023.
