= Mr. Pusskins =

Children's picture book

- Author: Sam Lloyd
- Illustrator: Sam Lloyd
- Cover artist: Sam Lloyd
- Language: English
- Genre: Children's picture book
- Published: 2006 (Orchard Books)
- Publication place: England
- Media type: Print (paperback)
- Pages: 32 (unpaginated)
- ISBN: 9781843629474
- OCLC: 67873167

Mr. Pusskins is a 2006 children's picture book by Sam Lloyd. It is about a pampered cat called Mr. Pusskins who craves adventure but after a wild escapade realises how fortunate his life is.

== Reception ==
Kirkus Reviews wrote ".. this shaggy story of “cattitude” is amusing and unadulterated fun.", and Publishers Weekly wrote "Although the writing can be overly literal, Lloyd's astutely cartooned pictures more than make up for what her prose lacks in punch." Booktrust found it "Humorous, lively illustrations accompany the text in this unconventional love story, which is also a lesson in not taking people for granted."

Mr. Pusskins has also been reviewed by Booklist, School Library Journal, Horn Book Guides, BookPage, Reading Time, Catholic Library World, and School Librarian.

It won the 2006 Booktrust Early Years Award for Best Pre-School Book.

== Publication history ==
- 2006 Mr. Pusskins, England, Orchard Books ISBN 9781843629474
- 2007 Mr. Pusskins: A Love Story, USA, Atheneum Books for Young Readers ISBN 9781416925170

== Sequels ==
Further stories involving Mr. Pusskins include:

- 2007, Mr. Pusskins and Little Whiskers England, Orchard Books ISBN 9781846165221
- 2008, Mr. Pusskins: Best in Show England, Orchard Books ISBN 9781846165245
- 2009, Mr. Pusskins Colours England, Orchard Books ISBN 9781408300428
- 2009, Mr. Pusskins Opposites England, Orchard Books ISBN 9781408300442
