= Russell the Sheep =

2005 children's picture book by Rob Scotton

- Front cover
- Author: Rob Scotton
- Language: English
- Genre: Children's literature
- Published: 2005 (HarperCollins)
- Publication place: United States
- ISBN: 9780007206223

Russell the Sheep is a 2005 children’s picture book by Rob Scotton, also the creator of Splat the Cat. The book tells the story of an insomniac sheep.

== Plot ==
Russell is a sheep that has trouble falling asleep at times. Perhaps he needs it to be dark for him to sleep. But he is scared of the dark. Perhaps he is too hot, perhaps not, he soon learns that sleeping is easier said than done. After all that fails, Russell attempts to count things to help him fall asleep. He counts his feet, the stars, all "6 hundred million billion and ten" of them but is still wide awake. He then has an epiphany and decides to count sheep. This finally helps him fall asleep.

== Reception ==
Reviews of the book were generally positive, complimenting the illustration style and humorous plot.

The New York Times stated the book was “A hilarious woolly insomniac…adorably funny…[A] runaway hit.”

Kirkus Reviews stated "Scotton makes a stylish debut with this tale of a sleepless sheep—depicted as a blocky, pop-eyed, very soft-looking woolly with a skinny striped nightcap of unusual length—trying everything, from stripping down to his spotted shorts to counting all six hundred million billion and ten stars, twice, in an effort to doze off. . . .Russell doesn’t have quite the big personality of Ian Falconer’s Olivia, but more sophisticated fans of the precocious piglet will find in this art the same sort of daffy urbanity. "

Publishers Weekly stated "Russell, a sheep longing for shuteye, is on the case in this sweet-natured picture book. . . . British native Scotton's children's book debut blends silly and warm into the kind of package that appeals to a broad age range. His stylized sheep—all fleecy white fluff atop matchstick-thin legs, with ping-pong-ball eyes—are simultaneously endearing and comic against a dark night-sky background. . . .This fresh-feeling bedtime story about one animal's restless ramblings should prove an entertaining send-off-to-the-Sandman for young readers."

== Awards ==
In 2005, the book was shortlisted for the Booktrust Early Years Award's Best New Illustrator Award.

In 2005, the book was also shortlisted for the Kate Greenaway Medal.

The book was chosen as a "Children's Choice" by the Children's Book Council.
