= Polly Dunbar =

English author and illustrator

- Born: 1977 (age 48–49); Cotswolds, England
- Occupations: Illustrator, writer
- Writing career
- Genre: Children's picture books
- Website: pollydunbar.com

Polly Dunbar (born 1977) is an English author-illustrator.

She is best known for her self-illustrated books Penguin, the Tilly and Friends series (which became a BBC children's television series) and Hello, Mum – an illustrated memoir of motherhood and her first book for adults.

She has also illustrated other authors' books: Bubble Trouble by Margaret Mahy, My Dad's a Birdman by David Almond, Can Bears Ski? by poet Raymond Antrobus, Owl or Pussycat? by Michael Morpurgo, and While We Can't Hug by Eoin Mclaughlin.

Hello, Mum is Polly's first book for grown-ups, a visual diary about early motherhood.

She is the daughter of children's book writer Joyce Dunbar, whose picture book Shoe Baby she illustrated.

== Biography ==
Dunbar was born in the Cotswolds and moved to Stratford upon Avon at eight months old. She went to school there until she was eleven and moved to Norwich with her family. There she attended City of Norwich School and Norwich School of Art and Design, now known as Norwich University College of the Arts. She started writing and illustrating at age 16, when she published two books – which she describes as "cartoon books inspired by teenage antics". She went to Brighton University and graduated in 1999 with a degree in illustration.

She lives in Waveny Valley, Suffolk with her partner and their two sons.

== Career ==
Polly Dunbar's Dog Blue and Flyaway Katie, both as author-illustrator, were published in 2004. The following year she illustrated Shoe Baby, written by her mother, author Joyce Dunbar.

Her 2007 book Penguin is her most critically acclaimed book to date, winning the Booktrust Early Years Awards in the pre-school category and the silver award in the Nestle Children's Book Prize for children under five years old.

She is also the illustrator for Here's A Little Poem which was on the IBBY honour's book list for 2008, and Bubble Trouble by Margaret Mahy, which won a Boston Globe–Horn Book Award in 2009.

Dunbar was named "Most Promising New Illustrator" in Publishers Weekly''s Cuffie Awards in 2004. In 2008, she was featured in The Times's list of "The best new picture book illustrators". In 2008 Booktrust named her one of the Ten Best Illustrators, and in 2011 she became their fourth writer in residence.

In 2020, Dunbar illustrated Can Bears Ski? by award-winning poet Raymond Antrobus, Owl or Pussycat? by Michael Morpurgo, and While We Can't Hug by Eoin Mclaughlin.

In 2021 her first adult book, Hello, Mum, was published by Faber and Faber.

== Adaptations ==
Her Tilly and Friends books became a BBC animated television series, which aired on CBeebies in 2012.

She co-founded Long Nose Puppets in 2006. Since then, the company has performed puppet adaptations of her books Penguin, Flyaway Katie, Shoe Baby, Arthur's Dream Boat, and soon While We Can't Hug. Their production of Shoe Baby won Best Children’s Show at Brighton Fringe Festival.

== Bibliography ==
- Henry VIII, Hole Story, Scholastic 2002
- Cleopatra, Hole Story, Scholastic 2002
- Scrooge, Hole Story, Scholastic 2002
- Flyaway Katie, Walker Books 2004
- Dog Blue, Walker Books 2004
- Penguin, Walker Books 2007
- Arthur's Dream Boat, Walker Books 2012
- Something Fishy, Two Hoots 2018
- A Lion is a Lion, Walker Books 2018
- Red Red Red, Walker Books 2019
- Hello, Mum, Faber and Faber 2021

=== Help series ===
- Help I've forgotten my Brain, Kingfisher 1996
- Help I'm out with the in-crowd, Kingfisher 1996

=== Tilly series ===
all published via Walker Books
adapted into BBC series 2012 cartoon Tilly and Friends on TVO Kids.

- "Hello Tilly" 2008, MIDI edition 6 September 2012 about a human girl
- "Happy Hector" 2008, MIDI edition 6 September 2012 about a pig boy
- "Pretty Pru" 2008, MIDI edition 6 September 2012 about a bird girl
- "Where's Tumpty?" 2008, MIDI edition 6 September 2012 about an elephant boy
- "Doodle Bites" 2008, MIDI edition 6 September 2012 about a girl crocodile
- "Goodnight, Tiptoe" 2008, MIDI edition 6 September 2012 about a boy bunny
- "Let's Get Wheeling!" 1 August 2013
- "Listen to Me!" 1 August 2013
- "Star Party" 1 August 2013
- "The Best Day Ever" 1 August 2013
- "What's Everyone Doing?" 3 April 2014
- "Who's Hiding?" 3 April 2014
- "Doctor Tilly" 3 July 2014
- "Tumpty's Plane" 3 July 2014

Sticker Activity Books:

- "Dressing Up" 3 October 2013
- "Play All Day" 3 October 2013

=== As illustrator ===
- A Saucepan on his Head, Collected Nonsense Poems written by M Baars and S Ellis, Walker Books 2001
- The Dragon Test written by June Crebbin, Walker Books 2003
- Hal the Highway Man written by June Crebbin, Walker Books 2003
- Lucy and the Fire Stone written by June Crebbin, Walker Books 2004
- Hal the Pirate written by June Crebbin, Walker Books 2004
- Looking after Louis written by Lesley Ely, Frances Lincoln Children's Books 2004
- Shoe Baby written by Joyce Dunbar, Walker Books 2005
- Down the Back of the Chair written by Margaret Mahy, Frances Lincoln Children's Books 2006
- My Dad's a Birdman written by David Almond, Walker Books 2007
- Measuring Angels written by Lesley Ely, Frances Lincoln Children's Books 2007
- Here's a Little Poem edited by Jane Yolen and Andrew Fusek Peters Walker Books 2007
- Bubble Trouble written by Margaret Mahy, Frances Lincoln Children's Books 2008
- The Boy Who Climbed into the Moon written by David Almond, Walker Books 2010
- A Cat Called Penguin, Holly Webb (author), 2011 ISBN 978-14-0712165-9
- Pat-a-Cake Baby written by Joyce Dunbar, Walker Books 2015
- I Will Not Wear Pink written by Joyce Dunbar, Otter-Barry Books 2016
- Buster and the Baby written by Amy Hest, Walker Books 2017
- The Hug written by Eoin Mclaughlin, Faber and Faber 2019
- While We Can't Hug written by Eoin Mclaughlin, Faber and Faber 2020
- Owl or Pussycat? written by Michael Morpurgo, David Fickling Books 2020
- Can Bears Ski? written by Raymond Antrobus, Candlewick Press 2020
- The Longer the Wait, the Bigger the Hug written by Eoin Mclaughlin, Faber and Faber 2021
- The Kiss written by Eoin Mclaughlin, Faber and Faber 2022
