= Joyce Dunbar =

English children's writer

- Born: 6 January 1944 (age 82); Scunthorpe, England
- Occupation: Writer
- Writing career
- Genre: Children's books
- Website: joycedunbar.com

Joyce Dunbar (born 6 January 1944) is an English writer. She primarily writes books for children, and has published over seventy books. Dunbar is perhaps best known for Tell Me Something Happy Before I Go To Sleep, This Is The Star, and the Mouse and Mole series. She is the mother of the children's writer-illustrator Polly Dunbar.

== Biography ==
Dunbar was born in 1944 in Scunthorpe, Lincolnshire, and is one of four children. Her father was a steel-worker and her mother was a fishing net maker. She grew up in Lincolnshire.

Dunbar attended Goldsmiths College in London, where she received a Bachelor of Arts in English. After that, she did several jobs, working as a nanny, a waitress, a barmaid, and a salesperson. In 1968, she started working as a teacher in a college drama department of Stratford-on-Avon, England. However, due to her gradual loss of hearing, Dunbar had to stop her teaching career and in 1989, she became a full-time writer.

Dunbar has two grown up children: Ben, a fashion photographer and Polly, an author illustrator. Dunbar currently lives in Norwich.

== Career ==
=== Writing ===
Dunbar published her first children's book at age 35. In 1985, Dunbar published Mundo and the Weather-Child – a novel about the imaginary friend of a deaf child, which helped her become a runner up for the Guardian Fiction Award. In 1990, her book A Bun for Barney was made into an interactive video game by BBC Multimedia Corporation.

In 1998, she wrote Tell Me Something Happy Before I Go To Sleep, which is recommended as a book to help children feel secure. In 2002 Dunbar did a book tour in the United States to promote this book. Her 2005 picture book Shoe Baby, illustrated by her daughter Polly, was made into a puppet show and is part of the 2006 Brighton Festival.

Dunbar most well-known series, Mouse and Mole (illustrated by James Mayhew), has been adapted into a 26-part television animation series by Grasshopper Productions, with voices lent by Alan Bennett and Richard Briers.

=== Other projects ===
Being a deaf person, Dunbar has participated in a number of campaigns on behalf of deaf people. In 1998, Dunbar cycled across Cuba in order to raise funds for the National Deaf Children's Society. Her journal Cycle Cuba, a record of this event, was published in 1999. That same year, she had a trip to the Himalayas in support of the founding of a new ashram. Dunbar has also taught English writing for children from Greek island Skyros.

Dunbar is on the steering group for the Picture project run by SCOPE, which is about the representation of children with disability in picture books.

== Selected bibliography ==
Children's fiction

- Pat-a-Cake Baby (Candlewick Press, 2015) - "It's good fun but definitely not quiet bedtime reading, especially since it concludes with multicolored capital letters spelling out "IT'S EATING TIME!""
- Puss Jekyll Cat Hyde (Frances Lincoln Children's Books, 2012) - "This slim British import, which combines beautiful artwork and brief, poetic text, seems more likely to appeal to adult cat lovers than to young listeners, but the dichotomy at its heart may be intriguing to some children, and the lush language pleases the ear and offers plenty to discuss."
- Moonbird (Random House, 2006)
- Where's My Sock? (Chicken House, 2006)
- Snow White (Retelling) (Scholastic, 2005)
- Shoe Baby (Candlewick Press, 2005) - "Polly Dunbar's delightful mixed-media collage illustrations of eccentric creatures great and small burst forth with as much glee as the text in this contagiously exuberant mother-daughter collaboration. "
- Boo to the Who in the Dark (Scholastic, 2004)
- The Love-Me Bird (Scholastic, 2003)
- Magic Lemonade (Egmont, 2003)
- Tell Me What It's Like To Be Big (Transworld, 2001)
- The Very Small (Transworld, 2000)
- Eggday (Holiday House, 1999) - "Every page bristles with color; brush strokes, dots, blots, and thumbprints create multi-layered scenes that fairly sing."
- The Glass Garden (Frances Lincoln, 1999)
- Tell Me Something Happy Before I Go To Sleep (Transworld, 1998)
- Baby Bird (Walker, 1998)
- If You Want To Be A Cat (Macdonald, 1997)
- This Is The Star (Transworld, 1996)
- Freddie The Frog (Ginn, 1996)
- Oops-A-Daisy (Walker, 1995)
- Little Eight John (Retelling) (Ginn, 1994)
- The Spring Rabbit (Anderson Press, 1994)
- Seven Sillies (Anderson Press, 1993)
- Can Do (Simon & Schuster, 1992)
- Why Is The Sky Up? (Dent, 1991)
- Ten Little Mice (Methuen, 1990)
- Joanna and the Bean-Bag Beastie (Ginn, 1989)
- Mouse Mad Madeline (Hamish Hamilton, 1988)
- The Raggy Taggy Toys (Orchard, 1987)
- Mundo and the Weather-Child (Heinemann, 1985)
- The Magic Rose Bough (Hodder & Stoughton, 1984)
- Jugg (Scolar Press, 1980)

Panda & Gander Series

- Panda's New Toy (Walker Books, 1999)
- Gander's Pond (Walker Books, 1999)
- The Secret Friend (Walker Books, 1999) - "Dunbar is especially astute at picking up on the emotional nuances of how children interact."

Mouse and Mole Series (illustrated by James Mayhew)

- Mouse and Mole (Transworld, 1993)
- Mouse and Mole Have A Party (Transworld, 1993)
- Happy Days For Mouse and Mole (Transworld, 1996)
- A Very Special Mouse and Mole (Transworld, 1996)
- A Fresh Start (Graffeg Limited, 2020)
- The Secret of Happiness (Graffeg Limited, 2021)
- Lo and Behold! (Graffeg Limited, 2021)
- Clink, Clank, Clunk! (Graffeg Limited, 2022)
- Boo to the Who (Graffeg Limited, 2023)
- What Might Have Been (Graffeg Limited, 2024)
- Odd Socks (Graffeg Limited, 2025)

Corgi Pups Collection (illustrated by Alison de Verde)

- Hip-Dip-Dip With Mouse and Mole (Corgi, 2000)
- The Ups And Downs of Mouse and Mole (Corgi, 2001)
