= Roger Priddy =

Author and creator of Priddy Books

Roger Priddy is the creator of Priddy Books, which publishes books for babies and young children. Priddy Books is a division of Macmillan Publishers and books published by the imprint have won several Practical Pre-School Awards.
