= June Crebbin =

British children's writer

- Born: 26 May 1938 (age 88); Birstall, England, UK
- Occupations: Teacher and writer
- Writing career
- Genre: Children's books

June Crebbin (born 26 May 1938) is a British writer for children based in Leicestershire. After she took early retirement as a primary school teacher, she wrote and published over 40 books.

== Life ==
Crebbin was born in Birstall, Leicestershire, just north of Leicester. She remembered creating poems that her father would type up for her. She trained as a primary school teacher at Dudley Training College and she taught for thirty years. She taught mostly in Leicestershire but in the sixties she taught for a couple of years in Yorkshire and a year in Kalamazoo, MI.

Her later interest in writing led her to take early retirement in 1990. She enjoys riding horses, particularly dressage and she owned a pony and trap. She gets ideas from the children she once taught and by talking at a local riding school where she meets the younger riders. She has created a number of books with horsey themes including Tarquin the Wonder Horse in 2000, her collection of Horse Tales in 2005, Jumping Beany and Ride to the Rescue.

She has written over forty books. Her successes include Fly by Night and Carrie Climbs a Mountain which were recognised with a Book of the Year citation in 1989 and 1993. Her story about a young owl Fly by Night was illustrated by Stephen Lambert and the five stories in Carrie Climbs a Mountain were illustrated by Thelma Lambert. Hal the Highwayman, a first reading book illustrated by Polly Dunbar, was Editor's Choice at the children's book magazine Books for Keeps in 2003.

She was chosen to edit Penguin's anthology of poetry The Puffin Book Of Fantastic First Poems.

== Private life ==
She and her husband John who is also a teacher have two adult sons. They live in Birstall.

== Selected works ==
- Fly by Night, illustrated by Stephen Lambert, 1993 Walker Books
- The Puffin Book Of Fantastic First Poems (editor) 2000
- My Dog, illustrated by Russell Ayto, 2001 Walker Books
- The Dragon Test illustrated by Polly Dunbar, 2003
- Hal the Highway Man illustrated by Polly Dunbar, 2003
- Lucy and the Fire Stone illustrated by Polly Dunbar, 2003
- Hal the Pirate illustrated by Polly Dunbar, 2003
