= Emily Windsnap =

Fantasy novel series by Liz Kessler

- Series Order: The Tail of Emily Windsnap; Emily Windsnap and the Monster from the Deep; Emily Windsnap and the Castle in the Mist; Emily Windsnap and the Siren's Secret; Emily Windsnap and the Land of the Midnight Sun; Emily Windsnap and the Ship of Lost Souls; Emily Windsnap and the Falls of Forgotten Island; Emily Windsnap and the Pirate Prince; Emily Windsnap and the Tides of Time; Emily Windsnap and the Crystal Caves
- Author: Liz Kessler
- Illustrator: Sarah Gibb, Natacha Ledwidge
- Cover artist: Sarah Gibb
- Country: United Kingdom
- Genre: Fiction
- Publisher: Orion Children's Books; Candlewick Press (US)
- Published: 2003–present
- Media type: Print (paperback), ebook, audiobook
- No. of books: 10 in the main series

Emily Windsnap is a series of children's fantasy novels written by British author Liz Kessler, inaugurated by The Tail of Emily Windsnap in 2003 and continuing as of 2025. It is illustrated primarily by Sarah Gibb and published by Orion Children's Books in Britain, and Candlewick Press in America. The series originated as a poem that Kessler was writing about a "little girl who lived on a boat but had a big secret"; an editor recommended that Kessler turn the poem into a book.

The series follows the adventures of thirteen-year-old Emily Windsnap after she discovers that she is half mermaid in the first book and is targeted towards middle grade readers.

== Summary ==
Emily Windsnap lives aboard a boat with her mother. After years of her mother trying to keep her out of the water, her mother gives Emily permission to take mandatory swim lessons at school when she turns thirteen. Class is going well until Emily dives into the pool and her legs lock together causing her to panic and need to be rescued by her teacher. Later that night Emily investigates this mysterious turn of events by diving into the ocean where she discovers that once her legs lock together they turn into a beautiful mermaid's tail! Realizing she is Semi-Mer, Emily sets out to discover her family history and find her father. On the way she makes friends with a teen mermaid named Shona Silkfin who invites her into the merworld under the sea. She discovers that Neptune, the King of the Sea, has banned marriages between merfolk and humans, and that her father is being held in the merworld prison by Neptune. Emily and Shona embark on an epic adventure to find her father and unite her family. Ultimately, she and her parents, with her friend Shona, start a new life at Alpoints Island.

== Bibliography ==
=== Main series ===
1. The Tail of Emily Windsnap (2003), illustrated by Sarah Gibb
  - Emily discovers she is a mermaid and goes on a quest to find her missing father.
2. Emily Windsnap and the Monster from the Deep (2004), illus. Sarah Gibb
  - Emily tries to impress her new mermaid friends but ends up waking the kraken.
3. Emily Windsnap and the Castle in the Mist (2006), illus. Natacha Ledwidge
  - Emily falls victim to an ancient curse and may have to choose between staying human or becoming a full mermaid.
4. Emily Windsnap and the Siren's Secret (2009), illus. Natacha Ledwidge
  - Emily goes on a quest to try and find the missing sirens.
5. Emily Windsnap and the Land of the Midnight Sun (2012), illus. Natacha Ledwidge
  - Emily and Aaron go on a top secret mission to the frozen north.
6. Emily Windsnap and the Ship of Lost Souls (2015), illus. Sarah Gibb
  - A mysterious ship appears and disappear throughout the day and answers only prompt more questions. Emily takes on a new mission to help the people of Atlantis.
7. Emily Windsnap and the Falls of Forgotten Island (2018), illus. Erin Farley
  - Even on vacation, adventure follows Emily as she falls into the other side of a waterfall and finds herself on a forgotten island with prophecies and devastation.
8. Emily Windsnap and the Pirate Prince (2019), illus. Erin Farley
  - Emily goes on a quest with a crew of pirates to save Aaron from rival pirates.
9. Emily Windsnap and the Tides of Time (2020), illus. Erin Farley
  - Emily Windsnap must travel through time in order to save the people of her hometowns—both human and merfolk—in the exciting ninth book of the New York Times best-selling series.
10. Emily Windsnap and the Crystal Caves (2025), illus. Erin Farley

=== Companion books ===
- Emily Windsnap's Friendship Book, illus. Sarah Gibb (Orion Children's Books, 2008), OCLC 191891106; US title, Emily Windsnap's Fin-tastic Friendship Book (Candlewick Press, 2009), OCLC 244417161
