= Vivian French =

British writer

Vivian June Isoult French MBE (born 1945) is a British writer of picture book texts, novels, plays, and non-fiction for children and young adults. She has written more than 250 books – including the picture book Oliver's Vegetables (1995), The Tiara Club series of chapter books illustrated by Sarah Gibb (2005) and The Most Wonderful Thing in the World (2015) illustrated by Angela Barrett.

== Life ==
Vivian French was born in Bedfordshire and educated at Cheltenham Ladies’ College and Exeter University. She has worked as an actor, for the National Book League, and as a community drama worker. As well as writing story books for young children, she has written plays and poetry.

According to data from the Public Lending Right, French was the 36th most borrowed author, and the 20th most borrowed children's author, from UK public libraries in 2011–2012.

A tutor in the Illustration Department at Edinburgh College of Art, Vivian is also co-founder of Picture Hooks, a mentoring scheme for young professional illustrators. In 2012 she was Guest Selector at the Edinburgh International Book Festival.

French was appointed Member of the Order of the British Empire (MBE) in the 2016 New Year Honours for services to literature, literacy, illustration, and the arts.

Her series Tales from the Five Kingdoms has been described as "hilarious adventures with wicked witches, trolls, bats and fairy-tale magic" (Books for Keeps) and the Sunday Telegraph has called French "a sublime story-teller".

== Works ==
- One ballerina two, 1991
- (with John Prater) Once upon a time, 1993
- Caterpillar, caterpilla, 1993
- Lazy Jack, 1995
- A song for little toad, 1995
- Oliver's vegetables, 1995
- Oliver's fruit salad, 1998
- The story of Christmas, 1998
- Growing frogs, 2000
- A present for Mom, 2002
- Baby Baby, 2002
- I love you, Grandpa, 2004
- T. Rex, 2004
- The Story House, 2004
- Princess Charlotte and the birthday ball, 2005, illus. Gibb
- Princess Katie and the silver pony, 2005, illus. Gibb
- Princess Daisy and the dazzling dragon, 2005, illus. Gibb
- Princess Alice and the magical mirror, 2005, illustrated by Sarah Gibb
- Princess Sofia and the sprakling surprise, 2005, illus. Gibb
- Princess Emily and the beautiful fairy, 2005, illus. Gibb

- Henny Penny, 2006
- The robe of skulls, 2007
- The bag of bones, 2008
- The heart of glass, 2009
- The flight of dragons, 2010
- The snarling of wolves, 2014
- The music of Zombies, 2014
- Yucky worms, 2009, Walker Books and Candlewick Press, illus. Jessica Ahlberg
- The Flight of Dragons, 2011
- " The Adventures of Alfie Onion", 2016
- Mountain Mona
- “Polly’s Pink Pyjamas”2010”
