= List of books written by Daisy Meadows =

This is a list of all published and upcoming books written by 'Daisy Meadows'. 302 books have been published in the Rainbow Magic series since 2003, including 8 US exclusives, and 2 upcoming books.

== Rainbow Magic ==
=== Main series ===
| # | Title | Series title | First published | Ghostwriter |
|---|---|---|---|---|
| 1 | Ruby the Red Fairy | Rainbow Fairies | 2003 | Narinder Dhami |
| 2 | Amber the Orange Fairy | Rainbow Fairies | 2003 | Narinder Dhami |
| 3 | Saffron the Yellow Fairy (US name: Sunny the Yellow Fairy) | Rainbow Fairies | 2003 | Sue Bentley |
| 4 | Fern the Green Fairy | Rainbow Fairies | 2003 | Narinder Dhami |
| 5 | Sky the Blue Fairy | Rainbow Fairies | 2003 | Sue Bentley |
| 6 | Izzy the Indigo Fairy (US and original name: Inky the Indigo Fairy) | Rainbow Fairies | 2003 | Narinder Dhami |
| 7 | Heather the Violet Fairy | Rainbow Fairies | 2003 | Sue Bentley |
| 8 | Crystal the Snow Fairy | Weather Fairies | 2004 | Narinder Dhami |
| 9 | Abigail the Breeze Fairy | Weather Fairies | 2004 | Sue Bentley |
| 10 | Pearl the Cloud Fairy | Weather Fairies | 2004 | Narinder Dhami |
| 11 | Goldie the Sunshine Fairy | Weather Fairies | 2004 | Sue Mongredien |
| 12 | Evie the Mist Fairy | Weather Fairies | 2004 | Sue Bentley |
| 13 | Storm the Lightning Fairy | Weather Fairies | 2004 | Sue Mongredien |
| 14 | Hayley the Rain Fairy | Weather Fairies | 2004 | Sue Bentley |
| 15 | Cherry the Cake Fairy | Party Fairies | 2005 | Sue Mongredien |
| 16 | Melodie the Music Fairy | Party Fairies | 2005 | Marilyn Kaye |
| 17 | Grace the Glitter Fairy | Party Fairies | 2005 | Narinder Dhami |
| 18 | Honey the Sweet Fairy (US name: Honey the Candy Fairy) | Party Fairies | 2005 | Sue Mongredien |
| 19 | Polly the Party Fun Fairy | Party Fairies | 2005 | Narinder Dhami |
| 20 | Phoebe the Fashion Fairy | Party Fairies | 2005 | Sue Mongredien |
| 21 | Jasmine the Present Fairy | Party Fairies | 2005 | Narinder Dhami |
| 22 | India the Moonstone Fairy | Jewel Fairies | 2005 | Narinder Dhami |
| 23 | Scarlett the Garnet Fairy | Jewel Fairies | 2005 | Sue Monegredien |
| 24 | Emily the Emerald Fairy | Jewel Fairies | 2005 | Narinder Dhami |
| 25 | Chloe the Topaz Fairy | Jewel Fairies | 2005 | Linda Chapman |
| 26 | Amy the Amethyst Fairy | Jewel Fairies | 2005 | Narinder Dhami |
| 27 | Sophie the Sapphire Fairy | Jewel Fairies | 2005 | Linda Chapman |
| 28 | Lucy the Diamond Fairy | Jewel Fairies | 2005 | Sue Monegredien |
| 29 | Katie the Kitten Fairy | Pet Keeper/Pet Fairies | 2006 | Sue Monegredien |
| 30 | Bella the Bunny Fairy | Pet Keeper/Pet Fairies | 2006 | Narinder Dhami |
| 31 | Georgia the Guinea Pig Fairy | Pet Keeper/Pet Fairies | 2006 | Sue Mongredien |
| 32 | Lauren the Puppy Fairy | Pet Keeper/Pet Fairies | 2006 | Narinder Dhami |
| 33 | Harriet the Hamster Fairy | Pet Keeper/Pet Fairies | 2006 | Sue Mongredien |
| 34 | Molly the Goldfish Fairy | Pet Keeper/Pet Fairies | 2006 | Narinder Dhami |
| 35 | Penny the Pony Fairy | Pet Keeper/Pet Fairies | 2006 | Sue Mongredien |
| 36 | Megan the Monday Fairy | Fun Day Fairies | 2006 | Narinder Dhami |
| 37 | Tallulah the Tuesday Fairy (US name: Tara the Tuesday Fairy) | Fun Day Fairies | 2006 | Sue Mongredien |
| 38 | Willow the Wednesday Fairy | Fun Day Fairies | 2006 | Narinder Dhami |
| 39 | Thea the Thursday Fairy | Fun Day Fairies | 2006 | Sue Mongredien |
| 40 | Freya the Friday Fairy (US name: Felicity the Friday Fairy) | Fun Day Fairies | 2006 | Narinder Dhami |
| 41 | Sienna the Saturday Fairy | Fun Day Fairies | 2006 | Sue Mongredien |
| 42 | Sarah the Sunday Fairy | Fun Day Fairies | 2006 | Narinder Dhami |
| 43 | Tia the Tulip Fairy | Petal Fairies | 2007 | Sue Mongredien |
| 44 | Pippa the Poppy Fairy | Petal Fairies | 2007 | Sue Mongredien |
| 45 | Louise the Lily Fairy | Petal Fairies | 2007 | Sue Mongredien |
| 46 | Charlie the Sunflower Fairy (US and original name: Charlotte the Sunflower Fairy) | Petal Fairies | 2007 | Narinder Dhami |
| 47 | Olivia the Orchid Fairy | Petal Fairies | 2007 | Narinder Dhami |
| 48 | Danielle the Daisy Fairy | Petal Fairies | 2007 | Narinder Dhami |
| 49 | Ella the Rose Fairy | Petal Fairies | 2007 | Sue Mongredien |
| 50 | Bethany the Ballet Fairy | Dance Fairies | 2007 | Narinder Dhami |
| 51 | Jade the Disco Fairy | Dance Fairies | 2007 | Sue Mongredien |
| 52 | Rebecca the Rock 'n' Roll Fairy | Dance Fairies | 2007 | Narinder Dhami |
| 53 | Tasha the Tap Dance Fairy | Dance Fairies | 2007 | Sue Mongredien |
| 54 | Jessica the Jazz Fairy | Dance Fairies | 2007 | Narinder Dhami |
| 55 | Saskia the Salsa Fairy (US name: Serena the Salsa Fairy) | Dance Fairies | 2007 | Sue Mongredien |
| 56 | Imogen the Ice Dance Fairy (US name: Isabelle the Ice Dance Fairy) | Dance Fairies | 2007 | Narinder Dhami |
| 57 | Helena the Horseriding Fairy (US name: Helena the Horse-riding Fairy) | Sporty/Sports Fairies | 2008 | Sue Mongredien |
| 58 | Francesca the Football Fairy (US name: Stacey the Soccer Fairy) | Sporty/Sports Fairies | 2008 | Narinder Dhami |
| 59 | Zoe the Skating Fairy | Sporty/Sports Fairies | 2008 | Sue Mongredien |
| 60 | Naomi the Netball Fairy (US name: Brittany the Basketball Fairy) | Sporty/Sports Fairies | 2008 | Narinder Dhami |
| 61 | Samantha the Swimming Fairy | Sporty/Sports Fairies | 2008 | Sue Mongredien |
| 62 | Alice the Tennis Fairy | Sporty/Sports Fairies | 2008 | Narinder Dhami |
| 63 | Gemma the Gymnastics Fairy | Sporty/Sports Fairies | 2008 | Sue Mongredien |
| 64 | Poppy the Piano Fairy | Music Fairies | 2008 | Narinder Dhami |
| 65 | Ellie the Guitar Fairy | Music Fairies | 2008 | Sue Mongredien |
| 66 | Fiona the Flute Fairy | Music Fairies | 2008 | Narinder Dhami |
| 67 | Danni the Drum Fairy | Music Fairies | 2008 | Sue Mongredien |
| 68 | Maya the Harp Fairy | Music Fairies | 2008 | Narinder Dhami |
| 69 | Victoria the Violin Fairy | Music Fairies | 2008 | Sue Mongredien |
| 70 | Sadie the Saxophone Fairy | Music Fairies | 2008 | Narinder Dhami |
| 71 | Ashley the Dragon Fairy | Magical Animal Fairies | 2009 | Sue Mongredien |
| 72 | Lara the Black Cat Fairy | Magical Animal Fairies | 2009 | Narinder Dhami |
| 73 | Erin the Firebird Fairy (US name: Erin the Phoenix Fairy) | Magical Animal Fairies | 2009 | Sue Mongredien |
| 74 | Rihanna the Seahorse Fairy | Magical Animal Fairies | 2009 | Narinder Dhami |
| 75 | Sophia the Snow Swan Fairy | Magical Animal Fairies | 2009 | Sue Mongredien |
| 76 | Leona the Unicorn Fairy | Magical Animal Fairies | 2009 | Narinder Dhami |
| 77 | Caitlin the Ice Bear Fairy | Magical Animal Fairies | 2009 | Sue Mongredien |
| 78 | Nicole the Beach Fairy | Green/Earth Fairies | 2009 | Narinder Dhami |
| 79 | Isabella the Air Fairy | Green/Earth Fairies | 2009 | Sue Mongredien |
| 80 | Edie the Garden Fairy | Green/Earth Fairies | 2009 | Narinder Dhami |
| 81 | Coral the Reef Fairy | Green/Earth Fairies | 2009 | Sue Mongredien |
| 82 | Lily the Rainforest Fairy (US name: Lily the Rain Forest Fairy) | Green/Earth Fairies | 2009 | Narinder Dhami |
| 83 | Milly the River Fairy | Green/Earth Fairies | 2009 | Sue Mongredien |
| 84 | Carrie the Snow Cap Fairy | Green/Earth Fairies | 2009 | Narinder Dhami |
| 85 | Ally the Dolphin Fairy | Ocean Fairies | 2010 | Sue Mongredien |
| 86 | Amelie the Seal Fairy | Ocean Fairies | 2010 | Narinder Dhami |
| 87 | Pia the Penguin Fairy | Ocean Fairies | 2010 | Sue Mongredien |
| 88 | Tess the Sea Turtle Fairy | Ocean Fairies | 2010 | Narinder Dhami |
| 89 | Stephanie the Starfish Fairy | Ocean Fairies | 2010 | Sue Mongredien |
| 90 | Whitney the Whale Fairy | Ocean Fairies | 2010 | Narinder Dhami |
| 91 | Courtney the Clownfish Fairy | Ocean Fairies | 2010 | Sue Mongredien |
| 92 | Ava the Sunset Fairy | Twilight/Night Fairies | 2010 | Narinder Dhami |
| 93 | Lexi the Firefly Fairy | Twilight/Night Fairies | 2010 | Sue Mongredien |
| 94 | Zara the Starlight Fairy | Twilight/Night Fairies | 2010 | Narinder Dhami |
| 95 | Morgan the Midnight Fairy | Twilight/Night Fairies | 2010 | Sue Mongredien |
| 96 | Yasmin the Night Owl Fairy (US name: Nia the Night Owl Fairy) | Twilight/Night Fairies | 2010 | Narinder Dhami |
| 97 | Maisie the Moonbeam Fairy (US name: Anna the Moonbeam Fairy) | Twilight/Night Fairies | 2010 | Sue Mongredien |
| 98 | Sabrina the Sweet Dreams Fairy | Twilight/Night Fairies | 2010 | Narinder Dhami |
| 99 | Madison the Magic Show Fairy | Showtime Fairies | 2011 | Sue Mongredien |
| 100 | Leah the Theatre Fairy (100th Book) | Showtime Fairies | 2011 | Narinder Dhami |
| 101 | Alesha the Acrobat Fairy | Showtime Fairies | 2011 | Sue Mongredien |
| 102 | Darcey the Dance Diva Fairy | Showtime Fairies | 2011 | Narinder Dhami |
| 103 | Amelia the Singing Fairy | Showtime Fairies | 2011 | Sue Mongredien |
| 104 | Isla the Ice Star Fairy | Showtime Fairies | 2011 | Narinder Dhami |
| 105 | Taylor the Talent Show Fairy | Showtime Fairies | 2011 | Sue Mongredien |
| 106 | Honor the Happy Days Fairy (US name: Hope the Happiness Fairy) | Princess Fairies | 2011 | Narinder Dhami |
| 107 | Demi the Dressing-Up Fairy (US name: Cassidy the Costume Fairy) | Princess Fairies | 2011 | Sue Mongredien |
| 108 | Anya the Cuddly Creatures Fairy | Princess Fairies | 2011 | Rachel Elliot |
| 109 | Elisa the Adventure Fairy (US name: Elisa the Royal Adventure Fairy) | Princess Fairies | 2011 | Rachel Elliot |
| 110 | Lizzie the Sweet Treats Fairy | Princess Fairies | 2011 | Narinder Dhami |
| 111 | Maddie the Playtime Fairy (US name: Maddie the Fun and Games Fairy) | Princess Fairies | 2011 | Rachel Elliot |
| 112 | Eva the Enchanted Ball Fairy | Princess Fairies | 2011 | Sue Mongredien |
| 113 | Jessie the Lyrics Fairy | Pop Star/Superstar Fairies | 2012 | Sue Mongredien |
| 114 | Adele the Singing Coach Fairy (US name: Adele the Voice Fairy) | Pop Star/Superstar Fairies | 2012 | Narinder Dhami |
| 115 | Vanessa the Dance Steps Fairy (US name: Vanessa the Choreography Fairy) | Pop Star/Superstar Fairies | 2012 | Sue Mongredien |
| 116 | Miley the Stylist Fairy | Pop Star/Superstar Fairies | 2012 | Narinder Dhami |
| 117 | Frankie the Make-up Fairy (US name: Frankie the Makeup Fairy) | Pop Star/Superstar Fairies | 2012 | Rachel Elliot |
| 118 | Rochelle the Star Spotter Fairy (US name: Alyssa the Star-Spotter Fairy) | Pop Star/Superstar Fairies | 2012 | Rachel Elliot |
| 119 | Una the Concert Fairy (US name: Cassie the Concert Fairy) | Pop Star/Superstar Fairies | 2012 | Rachel Elliot |
| 120 | Miranda the Beauty Fairy | Fashion Fairies | 2012 | Narinder Dhami |
| 121 | Claudia the Accessories Fairy | Fashion Fairies | 2012 | Sue Mongredien |
| 122 | Tyra the Dress Designer Fairy (US name: Tyra the Designer Fairy) | Fashion Fairies | 2012 | Rachel Elliot |
| 123 | Alexa the Fashion Reporter Fairy | Fashion Fairies | 2012 | Narinder Dhami |
| 124 | Matilda the Hairstylist Fairy (US name: Jennifer the Hairstylist Fairy) | Fashion Fairies | 2012 | Rachel Elliot |
| 125 | Brooke the Photographer Fairy | Fashion Fairies | 2012 | Rachel Elliot |
| 126 | Lola the Fashion Show Fairy | Fashion Fairies | 2012 | Sue Mongredien |
| 127 | Lottie the Lollipop Fairy (US name: Lisa the Lollipop Fairy) | Sweet/Sugar and Spice Fairies | 2013 | Narinder Dhami |
| 128 | Esme the Ice Cream Fairy | Sweet/Sugar and Spice Fairies | 2013 | Sue Mongredien |
| 129 | Coco the Cupcake Fairy | Sweet/Sugar and Spice Fairies | 2013 | Rachel Elliot |
| 130 | Clara the Chocolate Fairy | Sweet/Sugar and Spice Fairies | 2013 | Narinder Dhami |
| 131 | Madeleine the Cookie Fairy (US name: Madeline the Cookie Fairy) | Sweet/Sugar and Spice Fairies | 2013 | Rachel Elliot |
| 132 | Layla the Candyfloss Fairy (US name: Layla the Cotton Candy Fairy) | Sweet/Sugar and Spice Fairies | 2013 | Sue Mongredien |
| 133 | Nina the Birthday Cake Fairy | Sweet/Sugar and Spice Fairies | 2013 | Rachel Elliot |
| 134 | Mae the Panda Fairy | Baby Animal Rescue Fairies | 2013 | Rachel Elliot |
| 135 | Kitty the Tiger Fairy | Baby Animal Rescue Fairies | 2013 | Narinder Dhami |
| 136 | Mara the Meerkat Fairy | Baby Animal Rescue Fairies | 2013 | Narinder Dhami |
| 137 | Savannah the Zebra Fairy | Baby Animal Rescue Fairies | 2013 | Rachel Elliot |
| 138 | Kimberley the Koala Fairy (US name: Kimberly the Koala Fairy) | Baby Animal Rescue Fairies | 2013 | Narinder Dhami |
| 139 | Rosie the Honey Bear Fairy | Baby Animal Rescue Fairies | 2013 | Rachel Elliot |
| 140 | Anna the Arctic Fox Fairy (US name: Nora the Arctic Fox Fairy) | Baby Animal Rescue Fairies | 2013 | Narinder Dhami |
| 141 | Kayla the Pottery Fairy | Magical Crafts Fairies | 2014 | Narinder Dhami |
| 142 | Annabelle the Drawing Fairy | Magical Crafts Fairies | 2014 | Rachel Elliot |
| 143 | Zadie the Sewing Fairy | Magical Crafts Fairies | 2014 | Narinder Dhami |
| 144 | Josie the Jewelry-Making Fairy (US name: Josie the Jewelry Fairy) | Magical Crafts Fairies | 2014 | Rachel Elliot |
| 145 | Violet the Painting Fairy | Magical Crafts Fairies | 2014 | Narinder Dhami |
| 146 | Libby the Story-Writing Fairy (US name: Libby the Writing Fairy) | Magical Crafts Fairies | 2014 | Narinder Dhami |
| 147 | Roxie the Baking Fairy | Magical Crafts Fairies | 2014 | Narinder Dhami |
| 148 | Marissa The Science Fairy | School Day Fairies | 2014 | Rachel Elliot |
| 149 | Alison The Art Fairy | School Day Fairies | 2014 | Rachel Elliot |
| 150 | Lydia the Reading Fairy | School Day Fairies | 2014 | Rachel Elliot |
| 151 | Kathryn the PE Fairy (US name: Kathryn the Gym Fairy) | School Day Fairies | 2014 | Rachel Elliot |
| 152 | Julia the Sleeping Beauty Fairy | Fairytale Fairies | 2015 | Rachel Elliot |
| 153 | Eleanor the Snow White Fairy | Fairytale Fairies | 2015 | Rachel Elliot |
| 154 | Faith the Cinderella Fairy | Fairytale Fairies | 2015 | Rachel Elliot |
| 155 | Rita the Frog Princess Fairy (US only) | Fairytale Fairies | 2016 | Tracey West |
| 156 | Gwen the Beauty and the Beast Fairy (US only) | Fairytale Fairies | 2016 | Tracey West |
| 157 | Aisha the Princess and the Pea Fairy (US only) | Fairytale Fairies | 2016 | Tracey West |
| 158 | Lacey the Little Mermaid Fairy | Fairytale Fairies | 2015 | Mandy Archer |
| 159 | Martha the Doctor Fairy | Helping Fairies | 2015 | Rachel Elliot |
| 160 | Ariana the Firefighter Fairy | Helping Fairies | 2015 | Rachel Elliot |
| 161 | Perrie the Paramedic Fairy | Helping Fairies | 2015 | Rachel Elliot |
| 162 | Lulu the Lifeguard Fairy | Helping Fairies | 2015 | Rachel Elliot |
| 163 | Elle the Thumbelina Fairy | Storybook Fairies | 2016 | Rachel Elliot |
| 164 | Rosalie the Rapunzel Fairy | Storybook Fairies | 2016 | Rachel Elliot |
| 165 | Mariana the Goldilocks Fairy | Storybook Fairies | 2016 | Rachel Elliot |
| 166 | Ruth the Red Riding Hood Fairy | Storybook Fairies | 2016 | Rachel Elliot |
| 167 | Esther the Kindness Fairy | Friendship Fairies | 2016 | Rachel Elliot |
| 168 | Mary the Sharing Fairy | Friendship Fairies | 2016 | Rachel Elliot |
| 169 | Mimi the Laughter Fairy | Friendship Fairies | 2016 | Rachel Elliot |
| 170 | Clare the Caring Fairy | Friendship Fairies | 2016 | Rachel Elliot |
| 171 | Debbie the Duckling Fairy | Baby Farm Animal Fairies | 2017 | Rachel Elliot |
| 172 | Elodie the Lamb Fairy | Baby Farm Animal Fairies | 2017 | Rachel Elliot |
| 173 | Penelope the Foal Fairy | Baby Farm Animal Fairies | 2017 | Rachel Elliot |
| 174 | Billie the Baby Goat Fairy | Baby Farm Animal Fairies | 2017 | Rachel Elliot |
| 175 | Monica the Marshmallow Fairy | Candy Land/Sweet Fairies | 2017 | Rachel Elliot |
| 176 | Gabby the Bubblegum Fairy | Candy Land/Sweet Fairies | 2017 | Rachel Elliot |
| 177 | Lisa the Jellybean Fairy (US name: Franny the Jellybean Fairy) | Candy Land/Sweet Fairies | 2017 | Rachel Elliot |
| 178 | Shelley the Sherbet Fairy (US name: Shelley the Sugar Fairy) | Candy Land/Sweet Fairies | 2017 | Rachel Elliot |
| 179 | Rae the Rollercoaster Fairy | Funfair Fairies | 2018 | Rachel Elliot |
| 180 | Fatima the Face-Painting Fairy | Funfair Fairies | 2018 | Rachel Elliot |
| 181 | Paloma the Dodgems Fairy | Funfair Fairies | 2018 | Rachel Elliot |
| 182 | Bobbi the Bouncy Castle Fairy | Funfair Fairies | 2018 | Rachel Elliot |
| 183 | Etta the Elephant Fairy | Endangered Animals Fairies | 2018 | Karen Ball |
| 184 | Priya the Polar Bear Fairy | Endangered Animals Fairies | 2018 | Rachel Elliot |
| 185 | Chelsea the Chimpanzee Fairy | Endangered Animals Fairies | 2018 | Karen Ball |
| 186 | Selma the Snow Leopard Fairy | Endangered Animals Fairies | 2018 | Rachel Elliot |
| 187 | Aisha the Astronaut Fairy | Discovery Fairies | 2019 | Rachel Elliot |
| 188 | Orla the Inventor Fairy | Discovery Fairies | 2019 | Rachel Elliot |
| 189 | Annie the Detective Fairy | Discovery Fairies | 2019 | Rachel Elliot |
| 190 | Elsie the Engineer Fairy | Discovery Fairies | 2019 | Rachel Elliot |
| 191 | Teri the Trampolining Fairy | After School Sports Fairies | 2019 | Rachel Elliot |
| 192 | Bonnie the Bike-Riding Fairy | After School Sports Fairies | 2019 | Rachel Elliot |
| 193 | Rita the Rollerskating Fairy | After School Sports Fairies | 2020 | Rachel Elliot |
| 194 | Callie the Climbing Fairy | After School Sports Fairies | 2020 | Rachel Elliot |
| 195 | Deena the Diwali Fairy | Festival Fairies | 2020 | Rachel Elliot |
| 196 | Hana the Hanukkah Fairy | Festival Fairies | 2020 | Rachel Elliot |
| 197 | Elisha the Eid Fairy | Festival Fairies | 2021 | Rachel Elliot |
| 198 | Bea the Buddha Day Fairy | Festival Fairies | 2021 | Rachel Elliot |
| 199 | Layne the Surfing Fairy | Gold Medal Games Fairies | 2021 | Rachel Elliot |
| 200 | Riley the Skateboarding Fairy | Gold Medal Games Fairies | 2021 | Rachel Elliot |
| 201 | Soraya the Skiing Fairy | Gold Medal Games Fairies | 2021 | Rachel Elliot |
| 202 | Jayda the Snowboarding Fairy | Gold Medal Games Fairies | 2021 | Rachel Elliot |
| 203 | Li the Labrador Fairy (200th Book) | Puppy Care Fairies | 2022 | Rachel Elliot |
| 204 | Frenchie the Bulldog Fairy | Puppy Care Fairies | 2022 | Rachel Elliot |
| 205 | Seren the Sausage Dog Fairy | Puppy Care Fairies | 2022 | Rachel Elliot |
| 206 | Pandora the Poodle Fairy | Puppy Care Fairies | 2022 | Rachel Elliot |
| 207 | Niamh the Invitation Fairy | Birthday Party Fairies | 2023 | Rachel Elliot |
| 208 | Sara the Party Games Fairy | Birthday Party Fairies | 2023 | Rachel Elliot with Phillippa Willitts |
| 209 | Lois the Balloon Fairy | Birthday Party Fairies | 2023 | Rachel Elliot |
| 210 | Leahann the Birthday Present Fairy | Birthday Party Fairies | 2023 | Rachel Elliot |
| 211 | Helen the Sailing Fairy | Water Sports Fairies | 2024 | Rachel Elliot |
| 212 | Aria the Synchro Fairy | Water Sports Fairies | 2024 | Rachel Elliot |
| 213 | Yasmeen the Kayaking Fairy | Water Sports Fairies | 2024 | Rachel Elliot with Charlie Hart |
| 214 | Keiko the Diving Fairy | Water Sports Fairies | 2024 | Rachel Elliot with Charlie Hart |

=== Special Edition Fairies ('3 books in 1' edition) ===
| # | Title | First published | Ghostwriter |
|---|---|---|---|
| 1 | Holly the Christmas Fairy | 2004 | Narinder Dhami |
| 2 | Summer the Holiday Fairy (US name: Joy the Summer Vacation Fairy) | 2005 | Linda Chapman |
| 3 | Stella the Star Fairy | 2005 | Narinder Dhami |
| 4 | Kylie the Carnival Fairy | 2006 | Narinder Dhami |
| 5 | Paige the Pantomime Fairy (US name: Paige the Christmas Play Fairy) | 2006 | Narinder Dhami |
| 6 | Flora the Fancy Dress Fairy (US name: Flora the Dress-Up Fairy) | 2007 | Narinder Dhami |
| 7 | Chrissie the Wish Fairy | 2007 | Narinder Dhami |
| 8 | Shannon the Ocean Fairy (also re-released as a narwhal special in 2019) | 2008 | Narinder Dhami |
| 9 | Gabriella the Snow Kingdom Fairy | 2008 | Sue Mongredien |
| 10 | Mia the Bridesmaid Fairy | 2009 | Rachel Elliot |
| 11 | Trixie the Halloween Fairy | 2009 | Kristin Earhart |
| 12 | Destiny the Pop Star Fairy (US name: Destiny the Rock Star Fairy) | 2009 | Rachel Elliot |
| 13 | Juliet the Valentine Fairy | 2009 | Kristin Earhart |
| 14 | Belle the Birthday Fairy | 2010 | Rachel Elliot |
| 15 | Cheryl the Christmas Tree Fairy | 2010 | Rachel Elliot |
| 16 | Florence the Friendship Fairy | 2011 | Sue Mongredien |
| 17 | Emma the Easter Fairy | 2011 | Tracey West |
| 18 | Selena the Sleepover Fairy | 2011 | Rachel Elliot |
| 19 | Natalie the Christmas Stocking Fairy | 2011 | Rachel Elliot |
| 20 | Keira the Film Star Fairy (US name: Keira the Movie Star Fairy) | 2012 | Mandy Archer |
| 21 | Olympia the Games Fairy | 2012 | Narinder Dhami |
| 22 | Tamara the Tooth Fairy (US name: Brianna the Tooth Fairy) | 2012 | Rachel Elliot |
| 23 | Angelica the Angel Fairy | 2012 | Mandy Archer |
| 24 | Jennifer the Babysitter Fairy (US name: Bailey the Babysitter Fairy) | 2013 | Mandy Archer |
| 25 | Lindsay the Luck Fairy (US only) | 2013 | Kristin Earhart |
| 26 | Nicki the Holiday Camp Fairy (US name: Cara the Camp Fairy) | 2013 (UK); 2011 (US) | Tracey West |
| 27 | Carly the Schoolfriend Fairy (US name: Carly the School Fairy) | 2013 | Sarah Levison |
| 28 | Autumn the Falling Leaves Fairy (US only) | 2013 | Kristin Earhart |
| 29 | Robyn the Christmas Party Fairy | 2013 | Rachel Elliot |
| 30 | Addison the April Fool's Day Fairy (US only) | 2014 | Kristin Earhart |
| 31 | Lila and Myla the Twins Fairies | 2014 | Rachel Elliot |
| 32 | Tilly the Teacher Fairy | 2014 | Rachel Elliot |
| 33 | Giselle the Christmas Ballet Fairy | 2014 | Rachel Elliot |
| 34 | Heidi the Vet Fairy | 2015 | Rachel Elliot |
| 35 | Chelsea the Congratulations Fairy (US only) | 2015 | Shannon Penney |
| 36 | Daisy the Festival Fairy | 2015 | Rachel Elliot |
| 37 | Catherine the Fashion Princess Fairy | 2015 | Rachel Elliot |
| 38 | Alyssa the Snow Queen Fairy (US name: Alicia the Snow Queen Fairy) | 2015 | Rachel Elliot |
| 39 | Becky the Best Friend Fairy | 2016 | Rachel Elliot |
| 40 | Blossom the Flower Girl Fairy (US only) | 2016 | AnnMarie Anderson |
| 41 | Melissa the Sports Fairy | 2016 | Rachel Elliot |
| 42 | Fizz the Fireworks Fairy (US name: Skyler the Fireworks Fairy) | 2016 | Kristin Earhart |
| 43 | Elsa the Mistletoe Fairy | 2016 | Rachel Elliot |
| 44 | Susie the Sister Fairy | 2017 | Rachel Elliot |
| 45 | Sianne the Butterfly Fairy | 2017 | Rachel Elliot |
| 46 | Samira the Superhero Fairy | 2017 | Rachel Elliot |
| 47 | Christina the Winter Wonderland Fairy (US name: Michelle the Winter Wonderland Fairy) | 2017 | Kristin Earhart |
| 48 | Maria the Mother's Day Fairy | 2018 | Rachel Elliot |
| 49 | Ellen the Explorer Fairy | 2018 | Rachel Elliot |
| 50 | Cara the Coding Fairy | 2018 | Rachel Elliot |
| 51 | Evelyn the Mermicorn Fairy | 2018 | Rachel Elliot |
| 52 | Sasha the Slime Fairy | 2019 | Rachel Elliot |
| 53 | Ivy the Worry Fairy | 2019 | Rachel Elliot |
| 54 | Camilla the Christmas Present Fairy | 2019 | Rachel Elliot |
| 55 | Padma the Pirate Fairy | 2020 | Rachel Elliot |
| 56 | Greta the Earth Fairy | 2020 | Rachel Elliot |
| 57 | Brianna the Bee Fairy | 2020 | Rachel Elliot |
| 58 | Konnie the Christmas Cracker Fairy | 2020 | Rachel Elliot |
| 59 | Jude the Librarian Fairy | 2021 | Rachel Elliot |
| 60 | Paula the Pumpkin Fairy | 2021 | Rachel Elliot |
| 61 | Carmen the Cheerleading Fairy | 2022 (UK); 2017 (US) | Shannon Penney |
| 62 | Kat the Jungle Fairy | 2022 | Rachel Elliot |
| 63 | Harper the Confidence Fairy | 2022 | Rachel Elliot and Hayley Goleniowska |
| 64 | Hope the Welcome Fairy | 2023 | Rachel Elliot with Deborah Balogun, Davina Rungasamy and Jenny Tarr |
| 65 | Kimi the Bubble Tea Fairy | 2023 | Rachel Elliot |
| 66 | Nur the Vlogger Fairy | 2024 | Rachel Elliot |
| 67 | Zelda the Gamer Fairy | 2024 | Rachel Elliot |
| 68 | Eliza the Easter Bunny Fairy | 2025 | Rachel Elliot |
| 69 | Preeti the Prom Fairy | 2025 | Rachel Elliot |
| 70 | Katrina the Kitticorn Fairy | 2026 | Rachel Elliot |
| 71 | Margot the Board Game Fairy | 2027 | Rachel Elliot |
| 72 | Golden the K-Pop Fairy | 2027 | Rachel Elliot |

=== One-offs ===
| # | Title | First published | Ghostwriter |
|---|---|---|---|
| 1 | Hannah the Happy Ever After Fairy | 2006 | Narinder Dhami |
| 2 | Kate the Royal Wedding Fairy | 2011 | Rachel Elliot |
| 3 | Elizabeth the Jubilee Fairy | 2012 | Narinder Dhami and Rachel Elliot |
| 4 | Alexandra the Royal Baby Fairy | 2013 | Sarah Levison |
| 5 | Georgie The Royal Prince Fairy | 2014 | Rachel Elliot |
| 6 | Luna the Loom Band Fairy | 2014 | Rachel Elliot |
| 7 | Frances the Royal Family Fairy | 2015 | Rachel Elliot |
| 8 | Charlotte the Baby Princess Fairy | 2015 | Rachel Elliot |
| 9 | Tiana the Toy Fairy | 2016 | Rachel Elliot |
| 10 | Tiana the Toy Fairy: The Land of Sweets | 2017 | Rachel Elliot |
| 11 | Meghan the Wedding Sparkle Fairy | 2018 | Rachel Elliot |
| 12 | Zainab the Squishy Toy Fairy | 2019 | Rachel Elliot |
| 13 | Jae the Boy Band Fairy | 2019 | Rachel Elliot |
| 14 | Jacinda the Peace Fairy | 2020 | Rachel Elliot |
| 15 | Maryam the Nurse Fairy | 2021 | Rachel Elliot |
| 16 | Felicia the Fidget Toy Fairy | 2023 | Rachel Elliot |
| 17 | Charles the Coronation Fairy | 2023 | Rachel Elliot |
| 18 | Taylor the Pop Star Wedding Fairy | 2026 | Rachel Elliot |

=== Scholastic/Beginner reader books ===
Also published were Scholastic readers (UK name: Beginner reader) of the series intended for younger audiences with colored pictures and easier words.

| # | Title | First published | Ghostwriter |
|---|---|---|---|
| 1 | The Rainbow Fairies | 2010 (US); 2014 (UK) | Kristin Earhart |
| 2 | The Fairies' Birthday Surprise (UK name: A Magical Birthday Surprise) | 2010 (US); 2015 (UK) | Kristin Earhart |
| 3 | Best Friends in Fairyland (UK name: The Weather Fairies) | 2010 (US); 2015 (UK) | Kristin Earhart |
| 4 | A Fairy Ballet | 2011 (US); 2017 (UK) | Kristin Earhart |
| 5 | The Fairy Treasure Hunt | 2012 (US); 2016 (UK) | Kristin Earhart |
| 6 | A Fairyland Costume Ball | 2012 (US); 2016 (UK) | Kristin Earhart |
| 7 | Pet Fairies to the Rescue! (UK name: The Pet Keeper Fairies) | 2013 (US); 2017 (UK) | Kristin Earhart |
| 8 | Pet Parade | 2013 (US); 2017 (UK) | Kristin Earhart |

=== Early reader books ===
Also published were Early Reader versions of the main series intended for younger audiences that follow a similar format to the Special Editions and One-offs, but with simplified sentences, and coloured illustrations.

| # | Title | First published | Ghostwriter |
|---|---|---|---|
| 1 | Flora the Fancy Dress Fairy | 2012 | Narinder Dhami and Fiona Phillipson |
| 2 | Kylie the Carnival Fairy | 2012 | Narinder Dhami and Fiona Phillipson |
| 3 | Florence the Friendship Fairy | 2012 | Sue Mongredien and Fiona Phillipson |
| 4 | Belle the Birthday Fairy | 2013 | Rachel Elliot and Fiona Phillipson |
| 5 | Summer the Holiday Fairy | 2013 | Linda Chapman and Fiona Phillipson |
| 6 | Shannon the Ocean Fairy | 2013 | Narinder Dhami and Fiona Phillipson |
| 7 | Mia the Bridesmaid Fairy | 2014 | Rachel Elliot and Fiona Phillipson |
| 8 | Selena the Sleepover Fairy | 2014 | Rachel Elliot and Fiona Phillipson |
| 9 | Destiny the Pop Star Fairy | 2014 | Rachel Elliot and Fiona Phillipson |
| 10 | Keira the Film Star Fairy | 2015 | Mandy Archer and Fiona Phillipson |
| 11 | Tamara the Tooth Fairy | 2015 | Rachel Elliot and Fiona Phillipson |
| 12 | Olympia the Games Fairy | 2016 | Narinder Dhami and Fiona Phillipson |
| 13 | Alexandra the Royal Baby Fairy | 2016 | Sarah Levison and Fiona Phillipson |
| 14 | Kate the Royal Wedding Fairy | 2016 | Rachel Elliot and Fiona Phillipson |
| 15 | Georgie the Royal Prince Fairy | 2017 | Rachel Elliot and Fiona Phillipson |
| 16 | Catherine the Fashion Princess Fairy | 2017 | Rachel Elliot and Fiona Phillipson |
| 17 | Holly the Christmas Fairy | 2017 | Narinder Dhami and Fiona Phillipson |
| 18 | Frances the Royal Family Fairy | 2018 | Rachel Elliot and Fiona Phillipson |
| 19 | Elizabeth the Jubilee Fairy | 2018 | |
| 20 | Alyssa the Snow Queen Fairy | 2018 | |
| 21 | Charlotte the Baby Princess Fairy | 2019 | Rachel Elliot and Fiona Phillipson |

=== Graphic novel books ===
Also published are Graphic novel versions of the main series intended for beginning readers and graphic novel readers with the same page length as the main series but in a graphic novel format with short word balloons and colored illustrations done by Claudia Giuliani.

==== Main series ====
| # | Title | Series | First published | Ghostwriter |
|---|---|---|---|---|
| 1 | Ruby the Red Fairy | Rainbow Fairies | 2026 | Erika Turner |
| 2 | Amber the Orange Fairy | Rainbow Fairies | 2026 | Nora Neus |
| 3 | Saffron the Yellow Fairy (US name: Sunny the Yellow Fairy) | Rainbow Fairies | 2026 | Erika Turner |
| 4 | Fern the Green Fairy | Rainbow Fairies | 2026 | Nora Neus |
| 5 | Sky the Blue Fairy | Rainbow Fairies | 2027 | Nora Neus |
| 6 | Izzy the Indigo Fairy (US name: Inky the Indigo Fairy) | Rainbow Fairies | 2027 | Erika Turner |
| 7 | Heather the Violet Fairy | Rainbow Fairies | 2027 | Nora Neus |

=== Miscellaneous books ===
==== Activity books ====
- Fairy Friends Sticker Book
- Fairy Fashion Dress-Up Book
- Fairy Style Fashion Sticker Book
- Fairy Stencils Sticker Colouring Book
- My Rainbow Magic Birthday Secrets
- My Rainbow Magic Friendship Book
- Rainbow Magic Craft Book
- Rainbow Magic Activity Book
- Rainbow Magic Colouring Book
- My Rainbow Magic Sleepover Secrets
- My Rainbow Magic Keepsake Secrets
- Rainbow Magic Sticker Book
- Rainbow Magic Sticker Activity Book
- Fairy Sticker Fun
- Fairy Sticker Dressing
- Fairy Sticker Activity
- Fairy Fashion Doodle Book
- Make-and-Do Fairy Fun
- 1001 Fairy Stickers
- Fairy Holiday Doodle Book
- 101 things to Make and Do
- Magical Fairy Make and Bake
- Fairy Dress-Up Sticker Fun
- Fairy Summer Fun
- Sticker Dress-up Fairies

==== Choose Your Own Magic books ====
- Ruby the Red Fairy: Choose Your Own Magic
- Katie and the Missing Kitten: Choose Your Own Magic

==== Pop-up books ====
- Invitation to Fairyland

==== Factfile books ====
- The Complete Book of Fairies
- My Big Book of Fairies
- My A to Z of Fairies

Additionally, from 2009 to 2016, annuals were released yearly along with two holiday theme annuals.

== Magic Animal Friends ==
Magic Animal Friends is another book series written under the Daisy Meadows pen name. Its first series was released on 3 July 2014 with four books and there have been no more since 3 May 2018. The list is as follows:

=== Main series ===
| # | Title | Series | First published | Ghostwriter |
|---|---|---|---|---|
| 1 | Lucy Longwhiskers Gets Lost | 1 | 2014 | Valerie Wilding |
| 2 | Molly Twinkletail Runs Away | 1 | 2014 | Valerie Wilding |
| 3 | Ellie Featherbill All Alone | 1 | 2014 | Valerie Wilding |
| 4 | Bella Tabbypaw In Trouble | 1 | 2014 | Valerie Wilding |
| 5 | Sophie Flufftail's Brave Plan | 2 | 2015 | Valerie Wilding |
| 6 | Emily Prickleback's Clever Idea | 2 | 2015 | Valerie Wilding |
| 7 | Ruby Fuzzybrush's Star Dance | 2 | 2015 | Valerie Wilding |
| 8 | Rosie Gigglepip's Lucky Escape | 2 | 2015 | Valerie Wilding |
| 9 | Olivia Nibblesqueak's Messy Mischief | 3 | 2015 | Valerie Wilding |
| 10 | Evie Scruffypup's Big Surprise | 3 | 2015 | Valerie Wilding |
| 11 | Chloe Slipperslide's Secret | 3 | 2015 | Valerie Wilding |
| 12 | Grace Woollyhop's Musical Mystery | 3 | 2015 | Valerie Wilding |
| 13 | Hannah Honeypaw's Forgetful Day | 4 | 2016 | Valerie Wilding |
| 14 | Freya Snufflenose's Lost Laugh | 4 | 2016 | Valerie Wilding |
| 15 | Lottie Littlestripe's Midnight Plan | 4 | 2016 | Valerie Wilding |
| 16 | Matilda Fluffywing Helps Out | 4 | 2016 | Valerie Wilding |
| 17 | Katie Prettywhiskers To The Rescue | 5 | 2016 | Valerie Wilding |
| 18 | Phoebe Paddlefoot Makes A Splash | 5 | 2016 | Valerie Wilding |
| 19 | Millie Picklesnout's Wild Ride | 5 | 2016 | Valerie Wilding |
| 20 | Amy Snowycoat's Daring Dive | 5 | 2016 | Valerie Wilding |
| 21 | Pippa Hoppytail's Rocky Road | 6 | 2017 | Valerie Wilding |
| 22 | Lola Fluffywhiskers Pops Up | 6 | 2017 | Valerie Wilding |
| 23 | Emma Littleleap Takes a Chance | 6 | 2017 | Valerie Wilding |
| 24 | Sarah Scramblepaw's Big Step | 6 | 2017 | Valerie Wilding |
| 25 | Charlotte Waggytail Learns A Lesson | 7 | 2017 | Valerie Wilding |
| 26 | Layla Brighteye Keeps A Lookout | 7 | 2017 | Valerie Wilding |
| 27 | Ava Fluffyface's Special Day | 7 | 2017 | Valerie Wilding |
| 28 | Ella Snugglepaw's Big Cuddle | 7 | 2017 | Valerie Wilding |
| 29 | Jasmine Whizzpaws To The Rescue | 8 | 2018 | Valerie Wilding |
| 30 | Daisy Tappytoes Dares to Dance | 8 | 2018 | Valerie Wilding |
| 31 | Polly Bobblehop Makes a Mess | 8 | 2018 | Valerie Wilding |
| 32 | Imogen Scribblewhiskers' Perfect Picture | 8 | 2018 | Valerie Wilding |

=== Specials ===
| # | Title | First published | Ghostwriter |
|---|---|---|---|
| 1 | Poppy Muddlepup's Daring Rescue | 2014 | Valerie Wilding |
| 2 | Amelia Sparklepaw's Party Problem | 2015 | Valerie Wilding |
| 3 | Mia Floppyear's Snowy Adventure | 2015 | Valerie Wilding |
| 4 | Maisie Dappletrot Saves The Day | 2016 | Valerie Wilding |
| 5 | Holly Santapaws Saves Christmas | 2016 | Valerie Wilding |
| 6 | Anna Fluffyfoot Goes For Gold | 2017 | Valerie Wilding |
| 7 | Isla Waddlewing Breaks The Ice | 2017 | Valerie Wilding |
| 8 | Bertie Bigroar Finds his Voice | 2018 | Valerie Wilding |

=== Early reader books ===
| # | Title | First published |
|---|---|---|
| 1 | Lucy Longwhiskers | 2017 |
| 2 | Molly Twinkletail | 2017 |
| 3 | Ellie Featherbill | 2017 |
| 4 | Bella Tabbypaw | 2018 |
| 5 | Poppy Muddlepup | 2018 |
| 6 | Amelia Sparklepaw | 2018 |

=== Miscellaneous books ===
| # | Title | First published | Ghostwriter |
|---|---|---|---|
| 1 | Lucy Longwhiskers Finds A Friend (2015 World Book Day Special) | 2015 | Valerie Wilding |
| 2 | Magic Animal Friends Story Treasury | 2017 | |

== Unicorn Magic ==
Unicorn Magic was also a book series written under the Daisy Meadows pen name. Its first series began on 3 June 2019, and there have been no more since 11 November 2021. Each series has four books, with two releasing on the same day and the other two releasing on a later date. The list is as follows:

=== Main series ===
| # | Title | Series | First published | Ghostwriter |
|---|---|---|---|---|
| 1 | Dawnblaze Saves Summer | 1 | 2019 | Conrad Mason |
| 2 | Shimmerbreeze & the Sky Spell | 1 | 2019 | Jan Burchett and Sara Vogler |
| 3 | Glitterhoof's Secret Garden | 1 | 2019 | |
| 4 | Sparklesplash Meets the Mermaids | 1 | 2019 | |
| 5 | Silvermane Saves the Stars | 2 | 2020 | |
| 6 | Dreamspell's Special Wish | 2 | 2020 | |
| 7 | Slumbertail and the Sleep Pixies | 2 | 2020 | |
| 8 | Brighteye and the Blue Moon | 2 | 2020 | |
| 9 | Quickhoof and the Golden Cup | 3 | 2020 | |
| 10 | Brightblaze Makes a Splash | 3 | 2020 | |
| 11 | Fairtail and the Perfect Puzzle | 3 | 2021 | |
| 12 | Spiritmane and the Hidden Magic | 3 | 2021 | |
| 13 | Rosymane and the Rescue Crystal | 4 | 2021 | |
| 14 | Firebright and the Magic Medicine | 4 | 2021 | |
| 15 | Twinkleshade and the Calming Charm | 4 | 2021 | |
| 16 | Ripplestripe and the Peace Locket | 4 | 2021 | |

=== Specials ===
| # | Title | First published | Ghostwriter |
|---|---|---|---|
| 1 | Snowstar and The Big Freeze | 2019 | |
| 2 | Sparklebeam's Holiday Adventure | 2020 | |
| 3 | Queen Aurora's Birthday Surprise | 2020 | |
| 4 | Sweetblossom and The New Baby | 2021 | |
| 5 | Heartsong and the Best Bridesmaids | 2021 | |

== Pixie Magic ==
Pixie Magic was also a book series written under the Daisy Meadows pen name. Its first book was released on 6 July 2023, and there have been no more since 13 March 2025. The list is as follows:

=== Main series ===
| # | Title | First published | Ghostwriter |
|---|---|---|---|
| 1 | Emerald and the Friendship Bracelet | 6 July 2023 | Conrad Mason |
| 2 | Dotty and the Sweet Surprise | 12 October 2023 | Valerie Wilding |
| 3 | Pippin and the Birthday Bake | 14 March 2024 | Conrad Mason |
| 4 | Lacey and the Enchanted Thimble | 1 August 2024 | Valerie Wilding |
| 5 | Indigo and the Painting Promise | 7 November 2024 | Conrad Mason |
| 6 | Pearl and the Woolly Hug | 13 March 2025 | Valerie Wilding |
