= Ann Jungman =

British author (born 1938)

Ann Jungman (born 1938) is an author of children's literature. She was born in Highgate, North London of German Jewish refugees. She studied Law at Exeter University before training as a primary school teacher.

== Professional life ==
She founded Barn Owl Books in 1999, an independent publishing company that re-releases out-of-print children's books, publishing 8 books a year.

Her first book, Fang the Fiery Dragon, was published in 1972. She is probably best known for her series of books about Vlad the Drac. She wrote her 2004 book The Most Magnificent Mosque, set in Medieval Spain, because she "wanted to show that there had been a tolerant society in Europe a long time ago, and that the Muslims had been in Europe for a long time and had left a great legacy. There is no reason why Jews, Christians and Muslims can’t live side by side".

== Campaigning ==
She is a member of Jews for Justice for Palestinians and the Independent Jewish Voices Steering Committee.
