= Guardian Children's Fiction Prize =

Literary award

The Guardian Children's Fiction Prize or Guardian Award was a literary award that annually recognised one fiction book written for children or young adults (at least age eight) and published in the United Kingdom. It was conferred upon the author of the book by The Guardian newspaper, which established it in 1965 and inaugurated it in 1967 (58 years ago). It was a lifetime award in that previous winners were not eligible. At least from 2000 the prize was £1,500. The prize was apparently discontinued after 2016 (9 years ago), though no formal announcement appears to have been made.

== History ==
The prize was established in 1965 as the "only children's book award made to writers by their fellow authors"(2005 shortlist) and inaugurated by the 1967 award to Leon Garfield for Devil in the Fog (Constable & Co., 1966). Through the 2000 prize, announced 28 March, it recognised one book published in the UK during the preceding calendar year.

Between the 1999/2000 and 2000/2001 cycles, the prize schedule was rearranged to culminate in October during Booktrust Children's Book Week. "[F]iction for children aged seven and above, published in the UK between January 2000 and September 2001" (21 months) was eligible for the 2001 prize. Publishers were required to submit no more than ten entries by April 30.

At the same time, a summer program was inaugurated, using the newspaper's educational website and featuring a longlist announced in July. The program initially comprised merely an opportunity to vote for longlist favourites, comments by the judges to guide summer reading, and advice on "how to build a classic library of children's books".(2001 longlist) A version of the ongoing Young Critics contest was inaugurated in 2002 and the program has expanded since then to include online discussion and author interviews and appearances. Meanwhile, announcement of the longlist has advanced to late May or early June and announcement of the winner has retreated to November.

== Conditions ==
The shortlist of no more than four books and the winner were selected by three children's fiction writers, almost always including the latest winner. The Guardian described the prize as the only children's book award winner selected by peers. The newspaper's children's book editor Julia Eccleshare participated (from 2000 to 2016) in selection of the longlist and thereafter chaired the panel of final judges.

In years to 2016, a longlist of eight books was announced in May or June, a shortlist of no more than four announced in September, and a single winner. The longlist was the foundation for a summer program of reading, reviewing, and discussion.

The U.K. publishers of eligible books entered them for the prize with a fee, although the chair may call for submission. The publication year is August to July of the current year, but May, June, and July books must be submitted in advance. Books originally published in another language were eligible in English translation for five years.

Routinely, eligible books were entered for the prize by their UK publishers, as many as ten books each (2000) although chair Eccleshare also called for particular submissions.

== Honorees ==
Through 2016, 52 prizes were awarded in 49 years covering 1966 to mid-2015 publications. There were co-winners in 1992 and 1996.

=== 1960s ===
Guardian Children's Fiction Prize winners, 1967-1969
Year	Author	Title	Publisher	Result
1967	Leon Garfield	Devil-in-the-Fog	Constable	Winner
1968	Alan Garner	The Owl Service	Collins	Winner
1969	Joan Aiken	The Whispering Mountain	Jonathan Cape	Winner
1969	Samuel Youd	The Pool of Fire		Runner-up

=== 1970s ===
Guardian Children's Fiction Prize winners, 1970-1979
Year	Author	Title	Publisher	Result
1970	K. M. Peyton	The Flambards trilogy (1967–1969)	Oxford	Winner
1971	John Christopher	The Guardians	Hamish Hamilton	Winner
1972	Gillian Avery	A Likely Lad	Collins	Winner
1973	Richard Adams	Watership Down	Rex Collings	Winner
1974	Barbara Willard	The Iron Lily	Longman	Winner
1975	Winifred Cawley	Gran at Coalgate	Oxford	Winner
1975	Anne Fine	The Summer House Loon		Runner-up
1976	Nina Bawden	The Peppermint Pig	Gollancz	Winner
1977	Peter Dickinson	The Blue Hawk	Gollancz	Winner
1978	Diana Wynne Jones	Charmed Life	Macmillan	Winner
1979	Andrew Davies	Conrad's War	Blackie	Winner

=== 1980s ===
Guardian Children's Fiction Prize winners and finalists, 1980-1989
Year	Author	Title	Publisher	Result
1980	Ann Schlee	The Vandal	Macmillan	Winner
1980	Gillian Cross	The Iron Way		Runner-up
1981	Peter Carter	The Sentinels	Oxford	Winner
1982	Michelle Magorian	Goodnight Mr. Tom	Kestrel	Winner
1983	Anita Desai	The Village by the Sea	Heinemann	Winner
1983	Gillian Cross	The Dark Behind the Curtain		Runner-up
1984	Dick King-Smith	The Sheep-Pig(US title: Babe, the Gallant Pig)	Gollancz	Winner
1984	Anne Fine	The Granny Project	Puffin	Runner-up
1985	Ted Hughes	What is the Truth	Faber	Winner
1986	Ann Pilling	Henry's Leg	Viking Kestrel	Winner
1987	James Aldridge	The True Story of Spit MacPhee	Viking Kestrel	Winner
1987	Anne Fine	Madame Doubtfire	Puffin	Runner-up
1988	Ruth Thomas	The Runaways	Hutchinson	Winner
1989	Geraldine McCaughrean	A Pack of Lies	Oxford	Winner

=== 1990s ===
Guardian Children's Fiction Prize winners and finalists, 1990-1999
Year	Author	Title	Publisher	Result	Ref.
1990	Anne Fine	Goggle-Eyes	Hamish Hamilton	Winner	
1991 (Note: Cross won the 1990 Carnegie Medal for Wolf.)	Robert Westall	The Kingdom by the Sea	Methuen	Winner	
1991	Gillian Cross	Wolf	Oxford	Finalist	
1992	Rachel Anderson	Paper Faces	Oxford	Winner	
1992	Hilary McKay	The Exiles	Gollancz	Winner	
1992	Jamila Gavin	The Wheel of Surya		Finalist	
1993	William Mayne	Low Tide	Jonathan Cape	Winner	
1993	Terry Pratchett			Finalist	
1994	Sylvia Waugh	The Mennyms	Julia MacRae	Winner	
1994	Jamila Gavin	The Eye of the Horse		Finalist	
1995	Lesley Howarth	MapHead	Walker Books	Winner	
1996	Alison Prince	The Sherwood Hero	Macmillan	Winner	
1996	Philip Pullman	Northern Lights (US title, The Golden Compass)	Scholastic UK	Winner	
1996	Russell Hoban	The Trokeville Way	Jonathan Cape	Finalist	
1996	Beverley Naidoo	No Turning Back		Finalist	
1996	Chloë Rayban	Love In Cyberia		Finalist	
1997	Melvin Burgess	Junk	Penguin	Winner	
1997	Jamila Gavin	The Track of the Wind	Mammoth	Finalist	
1997	Keith Gray	Creepers		Finalist	
1997	Terry Pratchett	Johnny and the Bomb		Finalist	
1998	Henrietta Branford	Fire, Bed, and Bone	Walker Books	Winner	
1998	J. K. Rowling	Harry Potter and the Philosopher's Stone	Bloomsbury	Finalist	
1998	Jane Stemp	Secret Songs	Hodder Children's Books	Finalist	
1999	Susan Price	The Sterkarm Handshake	Scholastic UK	Winner	
1999	J. K. Rowling	Harry Potter and the Chamber of Secrets	Bloomsbury	Finalist	

=== 2000s ===
Until 2000, books published in the previous year were eligible for the award, and the award included a winner and a shortlist. In 2001, the award cycle was rescheduled to conclude in the fall rather than the spring. At the same time, a longlist of seven books was instituted with a shortlist of four to six books.

Guardian Children's Fiction Prize winners and finalists, 2000-2009
Year	Author	Title	Publisher	Min. Age	Result	Ref.
2000	Jacqueline Wilson	The Illustrated Mum	Transworld		Winner	
2000	David Almond	Kit's Wilderness	Hodder Children's Books		Shortlist	
2000	Bernard Ashley	Little Soldier	Orchard		Shortlist	
2000	Susan Cooper	King of Shadows	Bodley Head		Shortlist	
2000	Jan Mark	The Eclipse of the Century	Scholastic		Shortlist	
2000	J.K. Rowling	Harry Potter and the Prisoner of Azkaban	Bloomsbury		Shortlist	
2001 (Note: Naidoo won the Carnegie Medal for the listed work; Geras was a highly commended runner up.)	Kevin Crossley-Holland	The Seeing Stone	Orion		Winner	
2001	Allan Ahlberg	My Brother's Ghost	Puffin	9	Shortlist	
2001	Celia Rees	Witch Child	Bloomsbury	11	Shortlist	
2001	Karen Wallace	Raspberries on the Yangtze	Simon & Schuster	11	Shortlist	
2001	Adèle Geras	Troy	David Fickling/Scholastic	11	Longlist	
2001	Gaye Hiçyilmaz	Girl in Red	Orion	11	Longlist	
2001	Eva Ibbotson	Journey to the River Sea	Macmillan	10	Longlist	
2001	Margaret Mahy	24 Hours	Collins		Longlist	
2001	Jan Mark	Heathrow Nights	Hodder	12	Longlist	
2001	Beverley Naidoo	The Other Side of Truth	Puffin		Longlist	
2002 (Note: Pratchett won the Carnegie Medal for the listed work; Laird, Newbery and Sedgwick made the shortlist.)	Sonya Hartnett	Thursday's Child	Walker Books	12	Winner	
2002	Keith Gray	Warehouse	Red Fox	13	Shortlist	
2002	Elizabeth Laird	Jake's Tower	Heinemann, MacMillan	11	Shortlist	
2002	Linda Newbery	The Shell House	David Fickling	12	Shortlist	
2002	Terry Pratchett	The Amazing Maurice and his Educated Rodents (Note: The Amazing Maurice and his Educated Rodents is the 28th Discworld book and the first for children.)	Doubleday, Transworld	11	Shortlist	
2002	Marcus Sedgwick	The Dark Horse	Orion	12	Shortlist	
2002	Bernard Ashley	Revenge House	Orchard		Longlist	
2002	Julie Bertagna	Exodus	Macmillan		Longlist	
2002	Susan Cooper	Green Boy	Bodley Head		Longlist	
2003 (Note: The Curious Incident of the Dog in the Night-Time won two Whitbread Awards: Novel and overall "Book of the Year". Haddon and Almond made the Carnegie Medal shortlist for the listed works.)	Mark Haddon	The Curious Incident of the Dog in the Night-Time	Jonathan Cape, David Fickling	12	Winner	
2003	David Almond	The Fire-Eaters	Hodder	10	Shortlist	
2003	Kevin Brooks	Lucas	Chicken House	12	Shortlist	
2003	Alex Shearer	The Speed of the Dark	Macmillan	11	Shortlist	
2003	Simon French	Where in the World	Little Hare	9	Longlist	
2003	Keith Gray	Malarkey	Red Fox	13	Longlist	
2003	Marcus Sedgwick	The Book of Dead Days	Orion	10	Longlist	
2003	Jean Ure	Bad Alice	Hodder & Stoughton	10	Longlist	
2004 (Note: Cottrell Boyce won the Carnegie Medal for the listed work; Morpurgo made the shortlist.)	Meg Rosoff	How I Live Now	Puffin	14	Winner	
2004	Frank Cottrell-Boyce	Millions	Macmillan	9	Shortlist	
2004	Ann Turnbull	No Shame, No Fear	Walker Books	10	Shortlist	
2004	Leslie Wilson	Last Train from Kummersdorf	Faber	11	Shortlist	
2004	Kevin Brooks	Kissing the Rain	Chicken House	13	Longlist	
2004	Patricia Elliott	Murkmere	Hodder	10	Longlist	
2004	Jan Mark	Useful Idiots	David Fickling	13	Longlist	
2004	Michael Morpurgo	Private Peaceful	Collins	10	Longlist	
2005 (Note: Paver's book was the first in a series of six, the Chronicles of Ancient Darkness (2004 to 2009). She won the 2010 Prize for the concluding volume, Ghost Hunter.)	Kate Thompson	The New Policeman	Bodley Head	11	Winner	
2005	Julie Hearn	The Merrybegot	Oxford	10	Shortlist	
2005	Alex Shearer	The Hunted	Macmillan	11	Shortlist	
2005	Tim Wynne-Jones	The Boy in the Burning House	Groundwood Books, 2000; Usborne	10	Shortlist	
2005	Kevin Brooks	Candy	Chicken House	13	Longlist	
2005	Michelle Paver	Wolf Brother	Orion	9	Longlist	
2005	Philippa Pearce	The Little Gentleman	Puffin	9	Longlist	
2005	Christopher Russell	Brind and the Dogs of War	Puffin	10	Longlist	
2006 (Note: Reeve won for concluding a four-volume series. Almond and Cottrell Boyce made the Carnegie Medal shortlist for the listed works.)	Philip Reeve	A Darkling Plain	Scholastic UK		Winner	
2006	Patrick Cave	Blown Away	Simon & Schuster	13	Shortlist	
2006	Frank Cottrell-Boyce	Framed	Macmillan	11	Shortlist	
2006	Frances Hardinge	Fly by Night	Macmillan	11	Shortlist	
2006	David Almond	Clay	Hodder	12	Longlist	
2006	Siobhan Dowd	A Swift Pure Cry	Doubleday	12	Longlist	
2006	Jill Murphy	The Worst Witch Saves the Day	Penguin	8-11	Longlist	
2006	Tim Wynne-Jones	The Survival Game	Usborne	10	Longlist	
2007 (Note: Valentine's Prize-winning book was also on the year's Carnegie Medal shortlist.)	Jenny Valentine	Finding Violet Park	HarperCollins	12	Winner	
2007	Mary Hoffman	The Falconer's Knot	Bloomsbury	11	Shortlist	
2007	Sally Prue	The Truth Sayer	Oxford	10	Shortlist	
2007	Andy Stanton	Mr Gum and the Biscuit Billionaire	Egmont	7	Shortlist	
2007	Allan Ahlberg	The Boyhood of Burglar Bill	Puffin	8	Longlist	
2007	Charlie Fletcher	Stoneheart	Hodder	10	Longlist	
2007	Tim Lott	Fearless	Walker Books	12	Longlist	
2007	Mal Peet	The Penalty	Walker Books	12	Longlist	
2008 (Note: Siobhan Dowd won the Carnegie Medal for the listed work; Cottrell-Boyce and Ness made the shortlist.)	Patrick Ness	The Knife of Never Letting Go	Walker Books	13	Winner	
2008	Frank Cottrell-Boyce	Cosmic	Macmillan	9	Shortlist	
2008	Siobhan Dowd	Bog Child	David Fickling	13	Shortlist	
2008	Jenny Downham	Before I Die	Definitions	13	Shortlist	
2008	Tanya Landman	The Goldsmith's Daughter	Walker Books	11	Longlist	
2008	Rhiannon Lassiter	Bad Blood	Oxford	12	Longlist	
2008	Anthony McGowan	The Knife That Killed Me	Definitions	14	Longlist	
2009 (Note: Hearn, Pratchett, and Sedgwick made the Carnegie Medal shortlist for the listed works.)	Mal Peet	Exposure	Walker Books		Winner	
2009	Siobhan Dowd	Solace of the Road	David Fickling		Shortlist	
2009	Morris Gleitzman	Then	Puffin		Shortlist	
2009	Terry Pratchett	Nation	Doubleday		Shortlist	
2009	Bernard Beckett	Genesis	Quercus		Longlist	
2009	Sally Gardner	The Silver Blade	Orion		Longlist	
2009	Julie Hearn	Rowan the Strange	Oxford		Longlist	
2009	Marcus Sedgwick	Revolver	Orion		Longlist	

=== 2010s ===
Guardian Children's Fiction Prize winners and finalists, 2010-2016
Year	Author	Title	Publisher	Min. Age	Result	Ref.
2010 (Note: Paver won for concluding a six-volume series. According to JE, "It's relatively rare for a book late in a series to win a major prize, but the Chronicles of Ancient Darkness is such a towering achievement, as a whole as well as in terms of the individual books, that it was our unanimous choice." Philip Reeve also won in 2006 for concluding a four-volume series. On the shortlist, Gleitzman's Now was the third of a trilogy. Breslin and Sedgwick made the Carnegie Medal shortlist for the listed works.)	Michelle Paver	Ghost Hunter	Orion	10	Winner	
2010	Morris Gleitzman	Now	Puffin	9	Shortlist	
2010	Gregory Hughes	Unhooking the Moon	Quercus	11	Shortlist	
2010	Eva Ibbotson	The Ogre of Oglefort	Macmillan	8	Shortlist	
2010	Theresa Breslin	Prisoner of the Inquisition	Doubleday	12	Longlist	
2010	Ally Kennen	Sparks	Marion Lloyd Books	9	Longlist	
2010	Linda Newbery, illus. by Pam Smy	Lob	David Fickling	8	Longlist	
2010	Marcus Sedgwick	White Crow	Orion	13	Longlist	
2011 (Note: Mulligan made the 2012 Carnegie Medal shortlist with a different work, Trash (late 2010); Almond, Evans, and Pitcher made that shortlist with their Guardian Prize contenders.)	Andy Mulligan	Return To Ribblestrop	Simon & Schuster	10	Winner	
2011	David Almond	My Name is Mina	Hodder	9	Shortlist	
2011	Frances Hardinge	Twilight Robbery	Macmillan	11	Shortlist	
2011	Simon Mason	Moon Pie	David Fickling	10	Shortlist	
2011	Lissa Evans	Small Change for Stuart	Doubleday	8	Longlist	
2011	Saci Lloyd	Momentum	Hodder	12	Longlist	
2011	Annabel Pitcher	My Sister Lives on the Mantelpiece	Orion	10	Longlist	
2011	Andy Stanton, illus. David Tazzyman	Mr Gum and the Secret Hideout	Egmont	7	Longlist	
2012 (Note: This was Eva Ibbotson's second year on the shortlist after her death October 2010. Gantos's Dead End in Norvelt won the Newbery Medal for calendar year 2011's "most distinguished contribution to American children's literature" (for readers up to age 14).)	Frank Cottrell Boyce	The Unforgotten Coat	Walker	9	Winner	
2012	Roddy Doyle	A Greyhound of a Girl	Scholastic	12	Shortlist	
2012	Jack Gantos	Dead End in Norvelt	Corgi	12	Shortlist	
2012	Eva Ibbotson	The Abominables	Scholastic	8	Shortlist	
2012	Aidan Chambers	Dying to Know You	Bodley Head	14	Longlist	
2012	Russell Hoban	Soonchild	Walker	14	Longlist	
2012	Ally Kennen	Bullet Boys	Scholastic	14	Longlist	
2012	Dave Shelton	A Boy and a Bear in a Boat	David Fickling	9	Longlist	
2013 (Note: Stead was the first American winner of the Prize, which was opened to writers from outside the British Commonwealth in 2012. Gardner's Maggot Moon won the annual Carnegie Medal.)	Rebecca Stead	Liar & Spy	Andersen Press	10	Winner	
2013	David Almond, illus. Oliver Jeffers	The Boy Who Swam With Piranhas	Walker	9	Shortlist	
2013	John Green	The Fault in Our Stars	Penguin	12	Shortlist	
2013	Katherine Rundell	Rooftoppers	Faber	10	Shortlist	
2013	Gillian Cross	After Tomorrow	Oxford	10	Longlist	
2013	Sally Gardner	Maggot Moon	Hot Key Books	12	Longlist	
2013	William Sutcliffe	The Wall	Bloomsbury	12	Longlist	
2013	Lydia Syson	A World Between Us	Hot Key Books	14	Longlist	
2014 (Note: DiCamillo's Flora & Ulysses won the annual Newbery Medal from the American Library Association as the most distinguished U.S. children's book published during 2013. The longlist and shortlist were announced 28 June and 4 October, both about a month later than usual.)	Piers Torday	The Dark Wild	Quercus	11	Winner	
2014	Kate DiCamillo, illus. K. G. Campbell	Flora & Ulysses	Walker; U.S., Candlewick	9	Shortlist	
2014	E. Lockhart	We Were Liars	Hot Key Books; U.S., Delacorte	12	Shortlist	
2014	S. F. Said, illus. Dave McKean	Phoenix	David Fickling	10	Shortlist	
2014	Natasha Farrant	Flora in Love	Faber	12	Longlist	
2014	Candy Gourlay	Shine	David Fickling	12	Longlist	
2014	Marcus Sedgwick	She Is Not Invisible	Orion	12	Longlist	
2014	Francesca Simon	The Lost Gods	Faber/Profile	9	Longlist	
2015	David Almond	A Song for Ella Grey	Hodder		Winner	
2015	Frances Hardinge	The Lie Tree	Macmillan		Shortlist	
2015	Sally Nicholls	An Island of our Own	Scholastic		Shortlist	
2015	Kate Saunders	Five Children on the Western Front	Faber		Shortlist	
2015	Cece Bell	El Deafo	Amulet Books)		Longlist	
2015	Sarah Crossan	Apple and Rain	Bloomsbury		Longlist	
2015	Jennifer Niven	All The Bright Places	Penguin		Longlist	
2015	Jon Walter	My Name's Not Friday	David Fickling		Longlist	
2016	Alex Wheatle	Crongton Knights	Atom Books		Winner	
2016	Brian Selznick	The Marvels			Shortlist	
2016	Tanya Landman	Hell and High Water			Shortlist	
2016	Zana Fraillon	The Bone Sparrow			Shortlist	
2016	Malorie Blackman	Chasing the Stars			Longlist	
2016	Martin Stewart	Riverkeep			Longlist	
2016	Bonnie-Sue Hitchcock	The Smell of Other People's Houses			Longlist	
2016	G. R. Gemin	Sweet Pizza			Longlist	

== Winners of multiple awards ==
Six books have won both the Guardian Children's Fiction Prize and the Carnegie Medal (inaugurated 1936), which annually recognizes an outstanding book for children or young adults.

(Dates are years of U.K. publication, which were Carnegie award dates before 2006.)

- Alan Garner, The Owl Service (1967)
- Richard Adams, Watership Down (1972)
- Geraldine McCaughrean, A Pack of Lies (1988)
- Anne Fine, Goggle-Eyes (1989)
- Philip Pullman, His Dark Materials 1: Northern Lights (1995)
- Melvin Burgess, Junk (1996)

In 2001, The Seeing Stone by Kevin Crossley-Holland won the Tir na n-Og Award, best English-language book for young people with "authentic Welsh background".

In 2003, The Curious Incident of the Dog in the Night-Time by Mark Haddon won the 2003 Whitbread Awards as the year's best novel (not children's book) and the "Book of the Year" across all five categories. The Guardian children's book editor Eccleshare wrote, "Published on both an adult and a children's list, it is one of the few titles for which the ubiquitous claim of 'crossover' is not a gimmick. It genuinely has equal, though different, appeal to all readers – 15-year-old Christopher Boone's narrative voice is at once childlike in its observations, and adult in its profundity."

In 2007, Pullman's Northern Lights was named "Carnegie of Carnegies" for the award's 70-year celebration.

== Summer programme ==
The Young Critics competition was inaugurated in 2002 and is still underway. The newspaper solicited 200-word reviews of books on the longlist from children 16 and younger, with the prize being "a day editing and printing up their reviews".(retrospective by CA, 23 Sep 2002)

Ten years later there are dual competitions for children 17 and younger, one for individuals and one for teams of at least four schoolmates. There are cash prizes and free sets of the longlist books to the winners. Up to 30 students from the winning school also get a day at one Guardian site.(2012 Young Critics) The Young Critics contests are judged by Eccleshare, who also helps select the longlist, and another Guardian editor.

Beside the competition there is a summer book club that features one longlist book each week, with author interviews and discussion.

== See also ==
- Blue Peter Book Awards
- Carnegie Medal
- Children's Laureate
- Kate Greenaway Medal
- Nestle Smarties Book Prize
