= First Light (Stead novel) =

2007 novel by Rebecca Stead

- Hardcover version of First Light
- Author: Rebecca Stead
- Language: English
- Genre: Young adult, science fiction, mystery
- Publisher: Wendy Lamb Books
- Publication date: 2007
- Publication place: United States
- Media type: Print (hardcover)
- Pages: 336
- ISBN: 978-0-375-84017-3

First Light is a young adult science fiction and mystery novel by Rebecca Stead, first published in 2007. The novel follows Peter, who is in Greenland with his father and mother for research on global warming, and Thea, who lives in Gracehope, an underground colony located below Greenland. First Light explains how global warming is melting Gracehope and Peter and Thea's attempt to persuade the people to leave. The novel addresses the effects of global warming as a theme.

Stead began writing the novel in 2002, but her first draft was confusing and unorganized. To help her, she met editor Wendy Lamb who advised her to meet with a small group of people who would help critique the novel. After three years of work, Stead finished the second draft and met with Lamb who once again helped make improvements and later published the novel. Reviewers praised the description of Gracehope and main characters, as well as the performances of Coleen Marlo and David Ackroyd who voiced Thea and Peter in a subsequent audiobook publication of First Light.

== Inspiration and origins ==
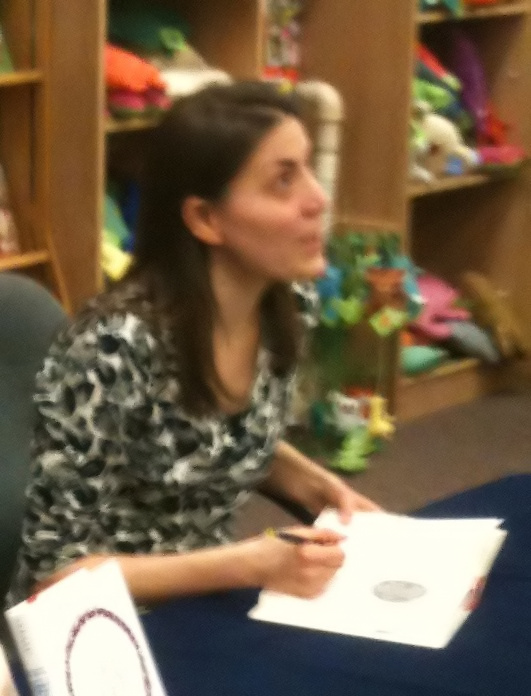
Stead signing books in 2010, next to a copy of First Light.

Stead drew inspiration from many sources in order to create the novel. As a child growing up in a big city, she was interested in the small towns which made her think "that in smaller places, everybody, even the kids, had special identities, where as in a city people are pretty anonymous". An idea began to form for a hidden society that also served as a small town.

Stead began writing First Light in 2002, but had no experience prior to that. The first draft turned out confusing and unorganized. To help her, Stead met with Wendy Lamb, an editor Stead had met in a workshop a few years before. Lamb suggested that Stead meet with a "critique group" who would help read and revise the drafts Stead wrote. After Stead created a revised copy of the novel in 2005, she sent it to Lamb again and a contract was drawn up. More revisions were made in order to make the new world created in the novel easier to understand. Stead found it hard "to maintain a sense of 'the whole'. Over and over I mapped out the book out for myself using post-its in a manila folder, trying to get a sense of where the tension went". The novel took three years to complete.

After the revisions were completed, much of the plot stayed the same, but several events in the original draft were cut out to strengthen the whole book. Stead combined two characters into one, having a stronger outline and also cut out several scenes for minor characters. In the end, Stead found that the revisions helped to make the book more cohesive.

== Plot summary ==
First Light follows the adventure of two protagonists, Peter, who lives with his mother and father in New York but is in Greenland for his father's research, and Thea, who lives in an underground colony in Greenland called Gracehope. Gracehope was formed hundreds of years ago by a group called the Settlers who used to live in England. They possessed unusual abilities, such as extremely good vision and hearing, leading them to be called 'eye adepts' and 'ear adepts', respectively. These powers were seen as sorcery, prompting Grace, the leader of the Settlers, to bring the Settlers under the ice in Greenland where they could live in peace.

While walking around her house, Thea finds a map in her room of Gracehope. The map shows a tunnel leading onto the surface. Thea and her cousin Mattias find the tunnel and meet Peter who helps them back to Gracehope. Reaching Gracehope, Peter realizes that several talismans of the people are in the shape of mitochondrial DNA, which his mom is studying. After waking up from a headache, Peter finds his mom next to his bed. She used to live in Gracehope but was banished with her sister after her sister ventured above the surface and contracted an illness that could not be cured. She also explains that her research of mitochondrial DNA relates to the ability of mutations to benefit the human body, which could cause their extremely good vision and hearing. In the end, she warns Peter that global warming is causing Gracehope to slowly melt away. The entire colony must learn the dangers they face and escape. One obstacle lies in their way: Rowen, Thea and Peter's grandmother who banished Peter's mom and did nothing to help Thea's mom when she was on her deathbed from an illness when she ventured aboveground. Rowen is the head of the Council in Gracehope and is strictly against going aboveground.

To convince the rest of the colony, Peter and Thea plan to use a piece of mythology, that a dog with four white paws would be supposedly born when it was time to leave. Such a dog had been born several days ago but has yet to open his eyes. Thea decides to proceed without using the dog and tries to convince the colony at a reenactment of the Settler's escape to Greenland with several allies who know of Rowen's actions. Just as Thea and her allies are about to lose the argument, Peter arrives with the dog, whose eyes are open. That, coupled with the fact that Peter is an eye adept, the first in a hundred years, convinces the colony to listen to Thea instead of Rowen. The novel ends eight months later as the people of Gracehope are slowly educated on global warming and the dangers of staying in their colony.

== Genre and themes ==
First Light is categorized as a science fiction and mystery novel. Katie Haegele from the Philadelphia Inquirer also listed the novel as a "slow-to-unfold mystery combining elements of science and history with an appealing note of fantasy". Kirkus Reviews classified the novel as an "ice-age mystery" as both Peter and Thea "discover one another's worlds as well as the truth about themselves". Connie Tyrrell Burns from School Library Journal found the novel to be "an exciting, engaging mix of science fiction, mystery, and adventure".

Reviewers also noted the environmental theme in the book. Kirkus Reviews found that "With the impending threat of global warning as an ominous backdrop, teens from very different worlds find they have much in common". In the novel, Peter finds an underground civilization beneath Greenland that is sinking as a result of global warming. Burns felt that First Light is a "great discussion starter of issues ranging from global warming to shunning and building a new society". VOYA recognized the global warming theme and also classified First Light as a coming-of-age tale.

== Critical reception ==
Publishers Weekly said, "It is a testament to the storytelling that the existence of this parallel world and the convergence of Peter and Thea's stories, told in separate chapters, are both credible and absorbing. Young readers will find this a journey worth taking." Kirkus Reviews found the novel to be a "Thoroughly enjoyable arctic adventure", praising how the adventure tests the main characters' courage as they learn the truth of both worlds. Vicky Smith from Horn Book Magazine found the two main characters well written and the city of Gracehope well structured. While, Smith found the city's origin unbelievable, she recognized that few people would care about that and compared the threat in First Light similar to the one in The City of Ember. Jenifer Hubert from Booklist also compared the novel to The City of Ember and to Neal Shusterman's Downsiders. Hubert criticized the slow beginning and flaws in the mythology and structure of the underground world, but still felt that "the icy setting and global-warming theme are well realized".

== Audiobook adaption ==
First Light has been made in an audiobook containing six disks and a length of seven hours and six minutes. The audiobook was released by the Listening Library and read by David Ackroyd and Coleen Marlo for the parts of Peter and Thea, respectively. Kathy Miller from School Library Journal praised the two readers for their performance which "engages listeners, and they are both adept at creating a different voice for each character and moving seamlessly between them". Miller also found the novel useful for starting a discussion on topics such as "political subterfuge and propaganda to global warming". A review from Horn Book Review by Jenifer Brabander praised the easy shifts from American to English accents made by both narrators. Brabander also found the tone given to Thea appropriate and compared the novel to Stead's second work, When You Reach Me, feeling that "[t]hough First Light doesn't reach the excellence of Stead's second novel, the Newbery-winning When You Reach Me, this audio will nevertheless draw listeners in with its narrators' strong talent".
