= Little Soldier (novel) =

1999 children's novel by Bernard Ashley

- First edition (publ. Orchard Books)
- Author: Bernard Ashley
- Publisher: Orchard Books
- Publication date: January 1, 1999
- ISBN: 9781860398797

Little Soldier is a 1999 children's novel by Bernard Ashley. It was shortlisted for the Carnegie Medal and 2000 for the Guardian Children's Fiction Prize.

== Plot summary ==
Kaninda, who escaped when his family was gunned down in their own home in Africa, is now in London. He longs to escape back to his country of Lasai so that he can avenge his family. Meanwhile, on the streets of London another form of tribal warfare - gang warfare - threatens to draw him in.
