= Forged in Fire (disambiguation) =

Forged in Fire is an American competition series that airs on the History channel.

Forged in Fire may also refer to:

- Forged in Fire (album), a 1983 album by Anvil
- Excelsior: Forged in Fire, a 2007 Star Trek novel by Andy Mangels and Michael A. Martin

== See also ==
- Forged in the Fire, a 2006 young adult novel by Ann Turnbull
- Forged by Fire, an album by Greek power metal band Firewind
- Forged by Fire (novel), a realistic fiction novel by Sharon M. Draper
- In Fire Forged, an anthology of stories set in the Honor Harrington universe
