= The Bunker Diary =

2013 novel by Kevin Brooks

- First edition
- Author: Kevin Brooks
- Language: English
- Genre: Young adult
- Published: 2013, by Penguin Books
- Publication place: United Kingdom
- Pages: 272
- Awards: Carnegie Medal, 2014
- ISBN: 978-0141326122
- OCLC: 818449894

The Bunker Diary is a 2013 young adult novel by Kevin Brooks. The Bunker Diary features the story of Linus Weems, a teenager who is captured and imprisoned in a mysterious bunker.

The novel won the 2014 Carnegie Medal for children's literature. After the Carnegie Prize win, the book was the focus of controversy due to its depictions of violence and its purported nihilism.

== Summary ==
The back cover reads:

I can't believe I fell for it.

It was still dark when I woke up this morning.

As soon as my eyes opened I knew where I was.

A low-ceilinged rectangular building made entirely of whitewashed concrete.

There are six little rooms along the main corridor.

There are no windows. No doors. The elevator is the only way in or out.

What's he going to do to me?

What am I going to do?

People are really quite simple, and they have simple needs. Food, water, light, space, privacy. Maybe a small measure of dignity. A bit of freedom. What happens when someone simply takes all that away?

Six people, all from different backgrounds mysteriously find themselves in an underground bunker where there are no windows and no way to escape but the elevator that brought them there. The book is the diary that the main character, Linus Weems, keeps in his time trapped in the bunker. In his diary, we witness the arrival of the other "inmates", their struggles, and their fight to figure out where they are.

== Plot ==
Teenager Linus Weems wakes up in an underground bunker, having been drugged with chloroform and kidnapped by a stranger. Although Linus is from a wealthy family, since the death of his mother and subsequent arguments with his father, he had run away from school and been living on the streets. A stranger was able to kidnap Linus by posing as a blind man needing assistance. As Linus adjusts to his new surroundings, he finds that the bunker has a kitchen, bathroom and six small bedrooms, but there are also cameras and microphones so that 'the man upstairs' (as Linus calls the kidnapper) can watch his every move.

Soon after Linus's arrival, other kidnap victims start being brought down through a lift – the lift being the means by which the kidnapper communicates. The first to arrive is nine-year-old Jenny, who forms a close bond with Linus. Jenny successfully convinces the kidnapper to send down food by presenting a polite, handwritten note to 'Him' via a message in the lift. Other kidnap victims arrive: Anja is a woman in her twenties; Bird is an older businessman; Fred is an addict; Russell is an elderly man with a brain tumor. The group quickly learn that any attempt at escape results in 'punishments' from the kidnapper, such as deafening noise being played, being knocked out with gas and food deliveries stopping or being poisoned. At one point, the kidnapper sends down vodka and drugs, presumably to stop the group from trying to work together effectively. Linus tries to convince everyone to continue co-operating, but his efforts are merely met with hostility and complaints from some of the group.

Desperate for escape, Linus attempts to lure 'the man upstairs' into the bunker, but the kidnapper sends down a vicious Doberman Pinscher in the lift instead. The dog attacks Bird, but it is killed by Fred. Due to this latest escape attempt, the food stops, and Linus resorts to eating insects. Soon after this, the group receives some meat in the lift, and a note saying that whoever kills another will be freed, causing a descent into chaos.

The terminally-ill Russell tries to persuade Linus to gain his freedom by killing him or Bird (who is dying of his injuries from the dog-attack), but Linus refuses. Anja is strangled to death by one of the group – the killer is never identified but is strongly presumed to be Bird, whose injuries are causing him to act strangely. The kidnapper continues to play games by sending a note, falsely implying that Linus committed the murder to create suspicion. Fred accidentally kills Bird in a fight while trying to protect Jenny. Russell commits suicide.

The days continue to pass, and the remaining three are left hungry and cold. Eventually, the lift descends with its doors closed and does not go back up. The three realise that 'the man upstairs' has gone, though they do not know whether he has been killed or has simply abandoned them. The power shuts off, leaving them in darkness and without water. Now weakened and delirious, Fred is killed when he drinks some bleach, after becoming desperate and ill. Linus and Jenny are left alone.

Shortly after, Jenny dies in Linus's arms. He reports that she simply 'goes to sleep and doesn't wake up'. Linus '[skins] dry' and eats Jenny's body, rationalising that it's all just meat. It is then implied that Linus also dies, as he writes that 'it doesn't hurt anymore'. The diary abruptly finishes mid-sentence.

== Adaptations ==
=== Theatre ===
In May 2023, the Edinburgh University Theatre Company performed an original adaptation of the novel in Bedlam Theatre.

== Reception ==
Kirkus Reviews gave a starred rating, writing "Not for everyone, this heady novel is worthy of study alongside existentialist works of the 20th century."

Awards
Preceded by Maggot Moon	Carnegie Medal recipient 2014	Succeeded by Buffalo Soldier
