= Susan Price =

English children's writer (born 1955)

- Born: 8 July 1955 (age 71); Dudley, England
- Occupations: Author of children's and young adult novels
- Writing career
- Notable works: The Ghost Drum (1987); The Sterkarm Handshake (1998)

Susan Price (born 8 July 1955) is an English author of children's and young adult novels. She has won both the Carnegie Medal and the Guardian Prize for British children's books.

Price was born in Dudley, Worcestershire (now West Midlands) in what is known as the Black Country. The region had a major effect on her writing which is "grounded in its history and geology, the limestone and iron ore and coal and fireclay of a landscape that spawned the industrial revolution". From a working class family, she left school without qualifications, and stacked supermarket shelves and washed up in hotel kitchens while writing her first books.

She has written over 60 books, and also worked as a Royal Literary Fund fellow attached to De Montford University.

== Writing ==
Many of Susan Price's works are fantasy, from science fiction to ghost stories; some are historical novels; others are about animals or everyday life. Many of her short stories are re-tellings of tales from folklore. Her first Ghost World novel, The Ghost Drum (1987), is an original fairy tale using elements from Russian history and Russian folklore. She won the Carnegie Medal from the Library Association, recognising The Ghost Drum as the year's best children's book by a British subject; reissued in 2024 it was described as a "rediscovered gem".

In The Sterkarm Handshake (1998) and its sequel A Sterkarm Kiss (2003), time travel brings together a young anthropologist from 21st century Britain and a young warrior from 16th century Scotland. They become lovers and she sides with his border clan in conflict with a 21st-century corporation. For the first book, Price won the Guardian Children's Fiction Prize, a once-in-a-lifetime award judged by a panel of British children's writers.

The Pagan Mars trilogy (2005–2008), also known as Odin or Mars, is set in a scientifically advanced alternative world where the pagan gods are still worshiped and slavery, called bondery, is commonplace.

== Bibliography ==
=== Novels - for older readers ===
- city life (1974)
- Twopence a Tub (1975)
- Sticks and Stones (1976)
- Home from Home (1977)
- Christopher Uptake (1981)
- From Where I Stand (1984)
- Ghost World
  - The Ghost Drum (1987) — winner of the Carnegie Medal
  - Ghost Song (1992)
  - Ghost Dance (1993)
- Foiling the Dragon (1994)
- Elfgift (1996)
- Elfking (1996)
- Sterkarm
  - The Sterkarm Handshake (1998) — winner of the Guardian Prize
  - A Sterkarm Kiss (2003)
  - A Sterkarm Tryst (2017)
- The Ghost Wife (1999)
- The Wolf-Sisters (2001)
- The Bearwood Witch (2001)
- Pagan Mars
  - Odin's Voice (2005)
  - Odin's Queen (2006)
  - Odin's Son (2008)
- Feasting the Wolf (2007)

=== Novels - for younger readers ===
- The Devil's Piper (1973)
- In a Nutshell (1983)
- Odin's Monster (1986)
- Master Thomas Katt (1988)
- The Bone Dog (1989)
- Phantom from the Past (1989)
- A Feasting of Trolls (1990)
- Thunderpumps (1990)
- Knocking Jack (1992)
- Coming Down To Earth (1994)
- A True Spell and a Dangerous (1998)
- The Saga of Aslak (1997)
- Pedro (Piccadilly Pips) (1997)
- Wolf's Footprint (2003)
- Olly Spellmaker & the Sulky Smudge (2004)
- Olly Spellmaker and the Hairy Horror (2004)
- Olly Spellmaker: Elf Alert! (2005)

=== Short story collections ===
- The Carpenter and Other Stories (1981)
- Ghosts at Large (1984)
- Ghostly Tales (1987)
- Here Lies Price (1987)
- Forbidden Doors (1991)
- Head and Tales (1995)
- Hauntings (1995)
- Nightcomers (1997)
- The Story Collector (1998)
- Ghosts and Lies (1998)
- Telling Tales (1999)
- The Kings Head (2002)
- The Fraid

=== As editor ===
- Horror Stories (1988)
- The Treasury of Nursery Tales (1991)
- The Dark Side: Truly Terrifying Tales (2007)
