= Jenny Downham =

British novelist and an ex-actress

Jenny Downham (born 1964) is a British novelist and an ex-actress who has published five books.

== Career ==
Her debut novel, Before I Die, is the fictional account of the last few months of a sixteen-year-old girl who has been dying of leukaemia for four years. The book won the 2008 Branford Boase Award. It was short listed for the 2008 Guardian Children's Fiction Prize and the 2008 Lancashire Children's Book of the Year and nominated for the 2008 Carnegie Medal and the 2008 Booktrust Teenage Prize. In 2012 it was adapted into a film called Now Is Good and starred Dakota Fanning.

Downham's second novel, You Against Me, was published in December 2010. The book is a novel about family, loyalty, and the choices which we have to make.

Her third novel, Unbecoming, published in 2016, is a story of three generations of women and the uncovering of family secrets.

Her fourth, Furious Thing, published in October 2019, was shortlisted in the children's book category of that year's Costa Book Awards.

In January 2025 she co-authored a novel, Let the Light In, with her son, Louis Hill. The dual narrative story is about a grieving family struggling in different ways to overcome their difficulties. In an interview for Just Imagine, Downham and Louis talked about how the novel was conceived and grew during the pandemic lockdown.

== Bibliography ==
- Before I Die (2007)
- You Against Me (2010)
- Unbecoming (2016)
- Furious Thing (2019)
- Let the Light In (2025), coauthored with Louis Hill
