= Patrick Cave =

British novelist

- Born: October 1965 (age 60) Bath, England
- Occupation: Novelist, comedy writer, teacher, pub manager, hypnotherapist
- Genre: Thriller, Science fiction

Patrick Cave (born October 1965) is a British novelist and hypnotherapist.

== Biography ==
Patrick Cave was born in Bath, England. He attended boarding school for seven years, during which he developed a love of music and of cross-country running. After obtaining his degree and a teaching certificate, he taught for ten years.

He then travelled around Europe and began writing books to support himself while in France.

Cave has always loved children's fiction, stating 'who could possibly understand the world better than children?' He believes that his readers bring their own meaning to his books and with all the ingredients of excitement, suspense, catharsis, and escapism present in the story, there is no one "message". One of his favorite writers is K.M. Peyton.

== Publications ==
1. Number 99
2. Last Chance
3. Sharp North
4. Blown Away
5. The Selected
6. Your Life does not Exist
7. Dying of Exposure (with Sophia Sheney)

== Reception of works ==
Cave's works have received favourable reviews.

Blown Away was shortlisted in The Guardian's 2006 children's fiction prize, where it was described as 'a thought-provoking novel about how individuals and societies survive when science creates new possibilities that threaten them'.

== Hypnotherapy ==
Cave has trained as a hypnotherapist and works in Bath and London. He is also a member of the Association of NLP Professionals.

== Personal life ==
Cave has three children. He is a Taoist.
