= Before I Die =

2007 young adult novel by Jenny Downham

- Author: Jenny Downham
- Language: English
- Genre: Young adult
- Publisher: David Fickling Books
- Publication date: 2007
- Publication place: United Kingdom
- Media type: Print (hardcover)
- Pages: 336
- ISBN: 978-0-385-75158-2

Before I Die is a young adult novel written by Jenny Downham, first published by David Fickling Books in 2007. The novel follows Tessa's shortly-ending life from her perspective.

== Plot ==
Tessa is diagnosed with acute lymphoblastic leukaemia. Despite four years of chemotherapy, she has discovered that her cancer is terminal, and her doctors give her a short time to live. Tessa, with the help of her best friend, Zoey, comes up with a list of things she wants to do before she dies, including some risky behaviours that she deems necessary to have "lived." Zoey is excited and supportive of the outrageous bucket list until an unplanned pregnancy test comes up positive.

Tessa's parents are divorced and have very different views on her desire to experience the dangerous side of life before she passes. Her mother is loving and joking about the situation and seems supportive, but she has not been present in Tessa's treatments or involved in her life at a deep level. Tessa's father is timid and just wants to spend time with his daughter. He is resistant to Tessa's behaviour from the start but realises that he has little influence and can only enjoy the time that they have left. Her father's main mechanism for coping is denial; she mentions that he spends hours on the computer looking up possible treatments for her even after the doctors told her that the cancer has consumed her body.

Tessa's brother, Cal, is a brutally honest individual and has mixed feelings throughout the novel ranging from lack of care to jealousy to sadness. In the beginning of the novel, Cal says to his sister "I'm gonna miss you" during a joking situation.

One of Tessa's last wishes is to find love, which she thinks that she has with her neighbour Adam. Adam is shy, and his main priority is taking care of his sickly mother after his father died.

The book is written in the first person from Tessa's point of view. It follows her last few months of life, explores her relationships with her loved ones, and her personal feelings about being trapped in a failing body.

== Characters ==
Tessa Scott
A 16-year-old battling leukaemia who has a bucket list of things she wants to do before she dies and makes Zoey and Adam help.
Cal Scott
Tessa's 11-year-old younger brother is stuck in the position of jealousy of his sister's attention and his sadness of her unavoidable death. Even in her last moments, Cal makes jokes such as "Bye, Tess. Haunt me if you like. I don't mind."
Zoey
Tessa's best friend, who in the beginning of the novel is her biggest advocate for living on the wild side, until Zoey becomes pregnant. Tessa occasionally asks Zoey, "Are you telling me to?" Zoey's answer is always "yes".
Adam
Tessa's boyfriend and neighbour, who spends most of his time attending to his mother and after the death of his father became depressed. Adam is there when Tessa takes her last breath and is the love of her short life.
Jake
The boy Tessa met in the club and lost her virginity to.
Scott
The father of Zoey's child and a good friend of Jake.
Tessa's father
He is desperate to keep his daughter alive and has come to realise that he does not have a say in her actions and can only hope that she will come to her senses, often stressed out about what Tessa is doing but does not know what to do.
Tessa's mother
She divorced from Tessa's father before Tessa was diagnosed. She has not been present in Tessa's treatments or involved in her life at a deep level.

== Awards and nominations ==
Before I Die was listed for the 2007 Guardian Awards and the 2008 Lancashire Children's Book of the Year. It was nominated for the 2008 Carnegie Medal and the 2008 Booktrust Teenage Prize. Before I Die won the 2008 Branford Boase Award.

== Film adaptation ==
The novel has been adapted into a film entitled Now Is Good by the production company Blueprint Pictures, in association with BBC Films and the UK Film Council. The film stars Jeremy Irvine as Adam, Dakota Fanning as Tessa and Kaya Scodelario as Zoey. Filming began on location in London and Brighton in July 2011. Now Is Good was released in September 2012.
