= Sylvia Waugh =

British writer of children's books (born 1935)

- Born: 1935 (age 90–91); Gateshead, England
- Occupation: Writer of children's books
- Children: 3
- Writing career
- Notable awards: Guardian Children's Fiction Prize (1994)

Sylvia Waugh (born 1935) is a British writer of children's books.

== Biography ==
Waugh was born in Gateshead, Northern England in 1935. Having worked as a teacher, careers advisor and teacher-librarian, Waugh began her writing career in 1987. Her first book, The Mennyms, was published by Julia McRae in 1993 and won the annual Guardian Children's Fiction Prize. She continued The Mennyms as a series of five books (1993 to 1996).

== Awards ==
Beside winning the Guardian Prize, The Mennyms (book one) was recognised in other ways:

- The Birmingham Readers & Writers Children's Book Award - a new prize, selected by schoolchildren
- An official commendation and the Silver Kiss (CPNB) for the Dutch 'Mennyms under Siege'
- A certificate from the American Hungry Mind Review naming it one of its 'Children's Books of Distinction'
- American Parenting magazine's 'Reading Magic Awards' - one of the top ten children's books in the USA for 1994, and one of the ten books of the decade that 'best withstand the test of time'.
- The whole series was awarded the Kinderbuchpreis 2000 in Vienna.

== Selected works ==
=== The Mennyms ===
- The Mennyms (Julia MacRae, 1993) — her first book
- Mennyms in the Wilderness (1994)
- Mennyms Under Siege (1995)
- Mennyms Alone (1996)
- Mennyms Alive (1996)

=== Ormingat trilogy ===
- Space Race (2000)
- Earthborn (2002)
- Who Goes Home? (2003)
