= Martyn Pig =

2002 novel by Kevin Brooks

- First edition
- Author: Kevin Brooks
- Original title: Martyn Pig
- Language: English
- Genre: Thriller novel
- Published: 1 April 2002 The Chicken House
- Publication place: United Kingdom
- Media type: Print (Hardback & Paperback)
- Pages: 256 pp (first edition, hardback)
- ISBN: 1-905294-16-6
- OCLC: 62479349

Martyn Pig is a thriller novel by Kevin Brooks, published on April 1, 2002 by The Chicken House and aimed at teens and young adults. Martyn Pig won the Branford Boase Award in 2003 and was shortlisted for the Carnegie Medal in 2002.

The first person narrative tells the story of Martyn Pig, a fourteen-year-old who is faced with a number of difficult decisions after the death of his father. After inadvertently killing his father during an argument, Martyn is afraid to call the police because he thinks he will be blamed for the accident. He also discovers that his father had inherited a large sum of money. With the help of Alex (the girl next door), Martyn disposes of the body. Alex's boyfriend, Dean, attempts to blackmail Martyn for the money, but his plan is thwarted because Martyn had left evidence that would link Dean to the body. Alex then disappears and the police arrive to question Martyn when Dean is killed in a motorcycle crash where the evidence points to Martyn. He is able to convince the police that he is innocent, but he realizes that Alex has betrayed him and taken the money. Some time later he receives a letter from Alex and it appears as if Martyn will finally be able to put the past behind him.

== Plot ==
=== Chapter 1: Wednesday ===
Martyn has often been harassed by others because of his strange name. He lives with his dad, William, who smokes, is an alcoholic and is often in a bad temper. His mum and dad are divorced, but somehow his dad managed to get custody of him. His Aunty Jean scares his dad because if his dad does anything wrong or is seen to be drunk or irresponsible, she will use it to try to get custody of Martyn. As Martyn goes Christmas shopping, it is shown that he is very sensitive and can experience sensory overload. Martyn's friend Alex moved into a rented house in his area with her mother two years previously. She is older than him, is good at impressions and has long black hair. She is going out with a boy called Dean West, who is 18 years old. Martyn does not like him and he is jealous of his relationship with Alex. He spends a while describing all of the things both physical and psychological that he does not like about Dean. Martyn arrives back at the house to find his father spraying shaving foam as a Christmas decoration. Then abruptly, Martyn says that he never meant to kill his father but was influenced by his love of The Complete Illustrated Sherlock Holmes and Raymond Chandler's The Big Sleep. Alex's mum previously played the character Shirley Tucker in a soap opera and was semi-famous. However, now she is back working part-time, as a nurse, and she hates it. She demonstrates her acting skills by imitating Martyn's drunken father. Martyn wonders why Alex is going out with Dean but she tells him to mind his own business. Next, Martyn talks about the four distinct stages of his father's drunkenness: Firstly, his dad is all 'matey' and gives him money. Then, secondly, his father enters self-pitying, moaning misery stage. Thirdly, his father becomes incoherent and then physically violent. Finally, he enters a drunken coma and blacks out. Martyn remembers the time that his father broke Martyn's wrist and a social worker got involved. However, his father put on a good show and convinced them that everything was okay. That night, he and his father are watching Inspector Morse on TV and his dad keeps shouting "Lewis! Lewis!" Martyn gets angry with his dad and yells at his dad to shut up. At this, his father gets very angry and attempts to punch Martyn. However, Martyn manages to dodge the punch and shove his dad into the hearth, inadvertently killing him. The prospect of having to live with Jean fills Martyn with dread.

=== Chapter 2: Thursday ===
That night, Martyn has a nightmare which involves Inspector Morse and his dead father, after which he takes a bath. He then begins to think of Einstein and how things are determined in the universe – forces beyond our control. Amongst his father's mail, he finds evidence that his dad inherited £30,000 from someone. He interrogates his father's corpse before venturing into his father's bedroom. The bedroom is very messy with bits of food and rubbish everywhere. He discovers that a woman named Miss Eileen Pig from Australia has bequeathed the money to his dad. Martyn looks through old photos of his parents. Then Alex arrives and the same argument breaks out as before, regarding what to do with the body. He wonders what he will say to the police when they arrive. They consider Martyn saying that he has been traumatized by events. They think of telling a story about Martyn's father being drunk and not coming home for a few days. They come up with a plan to get rid of the body in a gravel pit / quarry near a pub that he frequents. They intend to use Alex's mum's Morris Traveller to move the body. On top of this, Aunty Jean is due to arrive at 4pm the following day. It turns out that Dean has bugged Alex's bag and listened in to all of their conversations concerning the death of Martyn's father. His intention is to blackmail them into getting the £30,000 that Martyn's father inherited from his Australian relative. However, a change has occurred inside Martyn – he has found an inner strength that was not there before. He is no longer afraid of Dean and so will play along with his plan. Dean wants to exchange the cassette for the money on Monday at noon. Martyn then begins to collect Dean's hair and his discarded cigarette butt and puts them into an envelope.

=== Chapter 3: Friday ===
Alex and Martyn drag the body up the stairs. Over tea they have a discussion about right and wrong. Martyn considers the silence of intimacy. They apply make-up to Martyn's dad and record snores so that Aunty Jean will be convinced that he is still alive. Soon after this, Alex is sick and is a little embarrassed by this. There is a tense build-up to the arrival of Jean. Martin spins her a story about his dad being ill and the stench being due to sewage work going on outside. Martyn had forgotten to take the coins off the eyelids – so he does that before she sees. He says to her that it might be contagious as the tape begins to wind down. Luckily, she is fooled, and they go downstairs for a cup of tea. She tells Martyn that his father was always trouble and drank even when he was young. Martyn considers the influence of genes – nature vs nurture. Before she goes, Jean decides to go to the bathroom, which makes Martyn very tense because he knows that Alex is in there. However, she does not see her because Alex hides behind the shower curtain.

=== Chapter 4: Saturday ===
Martyn gets the bus to the beach, which he likes in winter. He likes to return to nature. In the snow, his mind begins to wander: he thinks of Alex and then his dad running in the snow. At a bus stop in a deserted village, he gets a bus home. He then unwinds by taking a bath. Alex calls as Martyn's bath towel embarrassingly falls off him. She has brought surgical masks. They put the body into a sleeping bag and drag it down the stairs. Eventually, they manage to get the body into the car. They drive off into the darkness and the snow, getting stuck on backroads. Martyn fantasises about escaping his current life and thinks of being under sunny skies by Christmas Day. They find the quarry and weigh down the body with rocks. They drive away safely. Martyn takes the opportunity to ask Alex about her relationship with Dean. She gets a little upset but assures him that she now hates Dean. They both agree that he will not be getting the money.

=== Chapter 5: Sunday ===
Martyn gives a poetic description of a church and graveyard. He seems at peace with himself. He prepares breakfast and listens to Desert Island Discs on the radio. He thinks he would bring detective books. The front room is worn and nicotine stained. The fireplace causes him to think of his father's death. He begins to ring Alex but cannot get a reply. He sees two men getting out of a car – one red-haired, the other tall and angular. He suspects that they are heading to Dom, a local drug dealer, to buy something. He considers how he got rid of all his childhood toys and games etc. He then talks about the eidetic imagery that he sees behind his eyelids. Finally, he eventually manages to contact Alex, who really does not want to call around. Their thoughts turn to their meeting with Dean the following day.

=== Chapter 6: Monday ===
Martyn recalls the time that he once shot a sparrow with an air pistol, which he is not proud of. Alex arrives at 10 am. Even though Martyn is happy to sign cheques to spend some of the money, Alex tells him not to as they are traceable. At 11 am, Alex gets a bus to Dean's flat. Dean arrives on his motorbike and Alex lets him in. When the time comes to exchange the money for the cassette, Martyn tells him that he is not going to give him any money. He tells him what they did with the body. He then tells Dean that he planted his hair and cigarette butt on the body. If Dean goes to the police with the cassette, then Martyn will tell them that Dean made them do it: he and Alex will get off lightly being children while Dean will go to real prison. Martyn also tells him that Alex has taken the copies of the cassette from his flat with the key he had given her. Dean leaves and Alex arrives back but she is behaving strangely. It turns out she did manage to get the copy of the cassette – both of which they burn. As they play Scrabble, they plan what they are going to do the next day – get some of the cash and buy things, maybe look into booking a holiday. Eventually Martyn says that they could be out of there by Christmas Day. Alex is hesitant, then she leaves. Martyn then says that that was the last time he ever saw her.

=== Chapter 7: Tuesday ===
When Martyn does not hear anything from Alex he calls around to her house but there's nobody there. Back in the house, he gradually realises that she has betrayed him by taking his dad's chequebook, cash-card, solicitor's letters, identification and some of his clothes. He figures that she and her mum intend to impersonate Martyn's father and cash the cheque for €30,000. He goes through all the likely scenarios in his mind, even briefly thinking that Dean might be in on the plan. At midnight, two policemen (Detective Inspector Breece and Detective Sergeant Finlay) come to the door and Martyn eventually lets them in. Breece begins to ask Martyn about Dean. Martyn says that he knows him but has not seen him for months. They present him with forged signatures found at Dean's flat and tell him that Dean died in a motorcycle accident earlier the previous day – the brake lines on his bike had been cut. They also reveal that they have found a piece of a face flannel with brake oil on it in Martyn's bathroom. In the end, they take Martyn away to the police station early on Christmas morning where he is a given a room for the night. Martyn realises that Alex had murdered Dean by cutting his brake lines and cannot quite believe it. He gets physically sick thinking about it. Something changes in Martyn that night. The only thing he cannot understand is why Alex left the solicitor's letters and forged signatures at Dean's flat.

=== Chapter 8: Christmas Day ===
The next morning Breece arrives with WPC Sally Sanders and tells Martyn that they have found his father's body. He plays innocent and even cries. They tell him his aunt is there but he says he does not want to see her. He thinks of a dog he once had called Jacko who his dad had once gotten rid of and this memory enables him to cry easily for anyone watching. He goes through all the problems that he must solve in his head. Breece and Finlay interview Martyn along with Peter Bennett from Social Services. They reveal that his father's body was found weighed down in a sleeping bag. Martyn then begins to spin them a story about how a few weeks previously, Dean had gotten angry with Martyn for chatting with his girlfriend at a dance. Dean and a friend then came to threaten Martyn. Dean went upstairs and found out that Martyn's dad was going to inherit money and demanded that Martyn have it for him by Monday. However, when he returns and Martyn does not have anything for him, he ransacks his dad's room. He says he will return later but never does. The interview ends and Bennett says he will bring Martyn to stay with his Aunty Jean. Martyn asks how they knew the location of the body and is told that they got an anonymous phone-call at 3am from a stolen mobile in the voice of a drunken 40-year old male.

=== Chapter 9: Epilogue ===
Martyn has been living with Aunty Jean for almost a year. She is always trying to 'educate' him. It transpires that she also has a drink problem, albeit better concealed than his father's. The investigation never came to anything - then there was a coroner's inquest and his dad's funeral. Although the police continued their investigations, they got nowhere due to a lack of proof. Then, one day in the conservatory of Jean's house, Breece asks Martyn how well he knew Alexandra Freeman. It turns out that the phone records show that Martyn and Alex were talking quite a lot on the phone around Christmas. Breece turns to him and asks him how it feels to get away with murder. As usual, Martyn claims complete ignorance. Then one day, Martyn gets a letter from Alex from California. In it, she reminds him of his belief that something is only wrong if you think it's wrong; if you think it's right and others think it's wrong, then it is only wrong if you get caught. She tells him that she is beginning to make it as an actress and that he should hurry up writing that murder mystery where she plays the murderer's beautiful mistress. Martyn puts the letter down and begins to notice it snowing outside.

== Characters ==
=== Martyn Pig ===
The protagonist and narrator of the novel is the eponymous Martyn Pig, a fourteen-year-old boy who lives with his father because his mother left them years ago. He has to do all the domestic work, because his father is an alcoholic and incapable of doing anything. Martyn loves to read thriller novels, murder mysteries and especially the comics of Sherlock Holmes whenever he can. His favourite TV series are Inspector Morse, Columbo and Law & Order. His best friend, Alex, often comes over to spend time with him. He is a naive and thoughtful teenager who is in love with Alex, although he knows that he does not have any chance because of her boyfriend. He ends up accidentally killing his father, William Pig.

=== Alexandra Freeman ===
Alex, a seventeen-year-old girl and Martyn's best friend, is considered beautiful, has long black hair and lives with her mother. They moved into Martyn's neighbourhood two years ago, when he was twelve and she was fifteen. Alex's mother is an actress and as soon as Alex finishes school, she wants to use her inherited talent and become an actress in her mother's footsteps. Alex is self-confident, adept at mimicking voices and is an opportunist. She admits to there being a negative side to the relationship between her and her boyfriend, Dean. At the end of the story, Alex murders Dean by cutting the brakes on his motorbike and frames Martyn for it; she also betrays Martyn by stealing all of his late father's money, and at the end, she sends him a letter explaining why. She is very bold.

=== William Pig ===
William 'Billy' Pig is Martyn's alcoholic father (also known as William Pig in the book). He is described as being a large and unpleasant fellow with oily black hair, a ruddy complexion and bloodshot eyes. He has abused Martyn both physically and verbally over the years, and gets his son to clean up all of his messes. At one point in Martyn's life, William was accused by his sister (Martyn's Aunty Jean) of being an unfit parent and, to keep custody of the boy, quit drinking for a short period of time, but he soon went back to his old ways. Martyn accidentally kills him because his father did not give him the peace he needed.

=== Aunty Jean ===
Aunty Jean is Martyn's aunt. She is very strict; Martyn eventually has to live with her because of after the death of his mother, his aunt wanted to have the guardianship of Martyn, but his dad got it. Martyn dislikes her. She is described to have blue crispy hair and a very scary personality. Martyn often has nightmares about Jean and does not want to live with her. At the end of the book it turns out better than he thought.

=== Dean West ===
Dean is Alex's boyfriend. He is described as having a lank blonde-coloured ponytail, pasty skin and washy eyes. He has a very negative personality, rides his motorcycle frequently and wears black leather. He becomes jealous of Martyn and Alex's relationship and tries to blackmail them into giving him the money that belonged to Martyn's late father. Near the end of the story, Alex cuts Dean's brake line on his motorcycle, which leads to Dean dying in a crash.
