= Goodbye Stranger (novel) =

2015 young adult novel by Rebecca Stead

- Original cover art for Goodbye Stranger. Modified slightly for publication.
- Author: Rebecca Stead
- Cover artist: Marcos Chin
- Language: English
- Genre: Children's novel
- Published: 2015
- Publisher: Wendy Lamb Books
- Publication place: United States
- Pages: 304
- ISBN: 978-0-385-74317-4
- Website: Official website

Goodbye Stranger is a 2015 young adult realistic fiction novel written by Rebecca Stead that details the social and personal challenges facing modern middle school students.

== Plot summary ==
The novel, set in New York City, is told from two intertwining perspectives. The first follows the set of friends "who drew creatures on their homework" and initially met in fourth grade, who are now entering seventh grade. Bridget "Bridge" Barsamian (who draws a three-eyed Martian) was involved in a serious accident and missed her third grade year while in the hospital; she starts hanging out with Sherm Russo, another seventh grader in Tech Crew, the school's stagehand organization. Tabitha "Tab" Patel (who draws a funny bird) becomes involved with the Human Rights Club at school. Emily "Em" (no surname given, who draws a spotted snake) is athletic and is starting to attract attention from boys.

In the second perspective, the story is told in the second person point of view. It revolves around an unnamed student who ditches school and avoids her friends on Valentine's Day. It is clear the student knows the first group and lives in the same neighborhood, but her identity has kept a mystery throughout much of the novel. Near the end of the story, this character is revealed as Tab's (Tabitha's) sister.

== Development ==
Stead said in 2015 that "Goodbye Stranger came from my thinking about and observing middle-school girls and the intense pressure they are under. It’s an interesting stage of life. Kids are changing so quickly, intellectually and physically, and have so many complicated questions about their identity, about how they see themselves, how others see them, and how they want to be seen." Bridge wears cat ears because of a chance encounter Stead had with a stranger in the street: "The idea came from a girl. She was wearing cat ears. And I said, 'Nice ears.' And she said, 'Thanks, I've been wearing them for a year. I don't know why.' And then she ran away."

=== Publication history ===
- — (August 4, 2015). Goodbye Stranger (1st, trade ed.). Wendy Lamb Books. ISBN 978-0-385-74317-4.
- — (August 4, 2015). Goodbye Stranger (1st, library ed.). Wendy Lamb Books. ISBN 978-0-375-99098-4.
- — (August 4, 2015). Goodbye Stranger (1st, ebook ed.). Wendy Lamb Books. ISBN 978-0-307-98085-4.
- — (May 2, 2017). Goodbye Stranger (1st, pbk ed.). Wendy Lamb Books. ISBN 978-0-307-98086-1.

== Reception ==
Meg Wolitzer, reviewing for The New York Times, said the novel "sensitively explores togetherness, aloneness, betrayal and love" and the second storyline "succeeds as a cautionary tale that signals what may lie ahead for the younger girls."

=== Awards ===
Goodbye Stranger received a 2016 Boston Globe–Horn Book Fiction Honor Award. National Public Radio named the novel to its 2015 list of Great Reads. School Library Journal named the novel to one of its Best Books of 2015. Booklist made the novel an Editors' Choice in 2015.

== See also ==
- The Kind of Friends We Used to Be (2009), by Frances O'Roark Dowell
- 33 Minutes (2013), by Todd Hasak-Lowy
