= The Ghost Drum =

1987 children's fantasy novel by Susan Price

- First edition
- Author: Susan Price
- Language: English
- Series: Ghost World
- Genre: Children's fantasy novel
- Publisher: Faber and Faber
- Publication date: 12 January 1987
- Publication place: United Kingdom
- Media type: Print (hardcover, paperback)
- Pages: 184 pp (first edition)
- ISBN: 0-571-14613-9
- OCLC: 59164609
- LC Class: PZ7.P9317 Gh 1987
- Followed by: Ghost Song

The Ghost Drum is a children's fantasy novel by Susan Price, published by Faber in 1987, and the first book in the Ghost World trilogy (1987 to 1995). It is an original fairy tale using elements from Russian history and Russian folklore. Like many traditional tales it is full of cruelty, violence and sudden death.

Price won the annual Carnegie Medal from the Library Association, recognising the year's best children's book by a British subject.

Farrar, Straus, and Giroux published a US edition within the calendar year, entitled The Ghost Drum: A Cat's Tale. Ghost Drum was reissued as a Young Adult Classic by Faber in 2024.

== Plot summary ==
The novel is represented as a tale told by the "most learned of all cats". At the beginning and at the head of each chapter, the cat introduces the scenes and the characters. At the end, the cat asks the hearer/reader to pass on the tale so that it may "make its own way back to me, riding on another's tongue."

A slave woman gives her new-born daughter to an old witch to be raised as a "Woman of Power". The witch teaches the girl, Chingis, all her arcane wisdom, including the use of the shamanic ghost drum. With the drum she can enter many other worlds including the ghost-world, the land of the dead. When Chingis's apprenticeship is complete, witches come from all around to congratulate her, but the shaman Kuzma envies and fears her potential for greatness.

The Czar Guidon, the latest in a long line of ruthless rulers, has married by the counsel of his advisers, but he is deathly afraid of being overthrown by his son. He imprisons his pregnant wife, Farida, in a windowless room at the top of the tallest tower in the palace, and when she dies in childbirth he orders that his son, the Czarevich Safa, should never leave the room. Marien, Safa's nurse, raises him there. When he becomes restless at his imprisonment, she dares to speak to the Czar about him and is summarily executed.

The Czarevich spends many years alone before his psychic cries of distress reach Chingis, and then, with the help of the ghost drum, she finds and secretly spirits him away. He is filled with astonishment and wonder at the world he has never seen so much as a glimpse of before. Meanwhile, the Czar dies, and fighting breaks out in the palace as his sister Margaretta ascends to the throne: she determines to find her nephew, intending to kill him. Kuzma, arriving in the form of a polar bear, offers to help her.

Using his shamanic knowledge against Chingis, Kuzma succeeds in killing her and capturing Safa. However, in the ghost world, Chingis enlists the help of her mentor and of Marien and Farida, to return to her body and defeat Kuzma. The four spirits take over Kuzma's body and destroy Margaretta before returning to the ghost world to await rebirth.

== Characters ==
- A learned cat, a teller of tales and singer of songs, the narrator
- Chingis, a young witch or shaman
- Chingis's mother, a slave
- An old witch, Chingis's foster-mother and mentor
- Kuzma, a jealous shaman who lives in the far north
- Safa, the Czarevich
- Czar Guidon, Safa's father
- Princess Margaretta, the Czar Guidon's sister
- Farida, otherwise known as the Czaritsa Katrina, Safa's mother
- Marien, Safa's nurse
- Vanya, one of the Czar's soldiers

== Themes and elements from folklore ==
The novel counterpoises the spiritual power of the shaman with the political power of the Czar. The absolute power of the Czar and the prevalence of slavery in the land are represented as productive of evil. The Czar's power is shown to be on uncertain ground; although he has the power of life and death over others, he is ruled by his fear of losing his Czardom. The shaman, however, whose power is based on knowledge, lives free, walks invisible, and is all but invulnerable to harm.

The familiar fairy-tale roles are switched: it is the prince who is imprisoned in a high tower, and the witch rescues him from the wicked princess.

The tale-telling cat is also found in Pushkin's poem "Ruslan and Ludmila", which is based on folk stories he heard as a child.

The terms 'witch' and 'shaman' are used interchangeably in the text, and both are applied to men as well as women. They can travel in other worlds in spirit, and they have healing gifts and other powers based on the various types of magic: the magic of herbs, the magic of words, the magic of writing and the magic of music. They demonstrate such skills as divining the future, invisibility and shape-shifting. The drum of the title is a common shamanic tool, in this case also marked with letters or runes through which the shaman can "question" the drum (similarly to the alethiometer in His Dark Materials).

Chingis and Kuzma both have huts with chicken legs like the well-known Russian witch Baba Yaga.

The four spirits are able to leave the ghost world because they have not eaten or drunk anything while there, expressing a common belief found in western myth.

== Literary significance and reception ==
The School Library Journal described the language of the novel as 'lyrical and poetic", saying that Susan Price "weaves together many common folkloric themes into an original story which is both charmingly new and hauntingly familiar". When reissued in 2024, the book was described as "a gem ... the Fabergé egg of fairytales."

== See also ==
Awards
Preceded by Granny Was a Buffer Girl	Carnegie Medal recipient 1987	Succeeded by A Pack of Lies
