= Break in the Sun =

- Genre: Drama
- Created by: Bernard Ashley
- Directed by: Roger Singleton-Turner
- Starring: Nicola Cowper, Brian Hall
- Country of origin: United Kingdom
- Original language: English
- No. of series: 1
- No. of episodes: 6

Production
- Producer: Anna Home
- Running time: 25 minutes

Original release
- Network: BBC1
- Release: 11 February – 18 March 1981

Break in the Sun is a British television drama serial made by the BBC in 1981.

The series, written by Bernard Ashley, was considerably more gritty and controversial than standard BBC children's serial fare up until that time, dealing with a young girl, Patsy (Nicola Cowper) running away from her violent stepfather (Brian Hall) and trying to return to her mother's old home in Margate.

The theme tune, "Reflections", was written by John Renbourn.

== Cast ==
- Nicola Cowper as Patsy Bligh
- Kevin Taffurelli as Kenny Granger
- Brian Hall as Eddie Green
- Catherine Chase as Sylvia Green
- Patsy Rowlands as Mrs. Granger
- Chip Sweeney as Mark Bowler
- Thomas Little as Jason
- Brian Peck as Joe
- Lindsey Walker as Jenny
- Steve Hodson as Pete
- Kathleen Heath as Mrs. Broadley
- Terry Cowling as Sergeant Harris
- Bob Mason as Bob
- Shirley Dixon as Ruth
- Roy Spencer as Mr. Lamb
- Peter Biddle as Eric
