= Brian Hall (actor) =

British actor (1937–1997)

- Hall as Terry in Fawlty Towers.
- Born: Brian Charles Hall; 20 November 1937; London, England
- Died: 16 September 1997 (aged 59); Worthing, England
- Occupation: Actor
- Years active: 1971–1994
- Spouse: Marlene Hall
- Children: 4

Brian Charles Hall (20 November 1937 – 16 September 1997) was a British actor. He is best remembered for his role as hotel chef Terry Hughes in the second series of the British sitcom Fawlty Towers.

== Career ==
Hall began his career on stage, appearing in productions at the Royal Court Theatre and with the Royal Shakespeare Company. On screen, he played many hard-boiled tough guy Cockney roles: his role as the amiable chef Terry in Fawlty Towers was a casting against type. He played leading roles in police drama Softly, Softly: Task Force (1971–72), crime drama McVicar (1980), and sitcom You Must Be The Husband (1987). He also had several guest-starring roles in The Professionals, The Long Good Friday, The Bill, London's Burning, The Sweeney and Minder in Series 1 episode You Gotta Have Friends. He also played the Dad in Billy Webb's Amazing Story by Steve Attridge (1991 BBC).

== Personal life and death ==
Hall was born on 20 November 1937, and had an interest in acting from an early age. He worked as a cab driver before starting a professional acting career.

Hall became friends with John Cleese when they appeared together in Fawlty Towers. Some years after the series had finished, Cleese sent Hall an autographed picture as a joke. Hall wrote back and demanded a "signed Rolls-Royce car" instead. Cleese sent him back a car – a children's toy car.

Hall and his wife, Marlene, had four children. He died at a hospice in Worthing on 16 September 1997, aged 59, after a three-year battle with cancer. Cleese paid tribute, saying: "I am very upset. I was particularly fond of Brian and had several conversations with him this year. I admire profoundly the way in which he dealt with his cancer. I do not know where he found the strength". A year before his death, Hall told the Mirror: "Cancer is a bully and I hate bullies. This old boy cancer will get about as much change out of me as all the other bullies I've met – nothing."

== Filmography ==
| Year | Title | Role | Notes |
|---|---|---|---|
| 1973 | Adolf Hitler – My Part in His Downfall | MP Sergeant | |
| 1973 | Yellow Dog | Bertram | |
| 1974 | From Beyond the Grave | Man on Phone | Uncredited |
| 1974 | Confessions of a Window Cleaner | 2nd Removal Man | |
| 1974 | The Land That Time Forgot | Schwartz | |
| 1976 | Trial by Combat | Policeman with Alsatian | |
| 1976 | Voyage of the Damned | Ship Waiter | Uncredited |
| 1978 | Sweeney 2 | Haughton | |
| 1979 | Fawlty Towers | Terry Hughes | TV series |
| 1980 | Sweet William | | |
| 1980 | McVicar | Terry Stokes | |
| 1980 | The Long Good Friday | Alan | |
| 1981 | Break in the Sun | Eddie Green | TV series |
| 1983 | Up The Elephant And Round The Castle | Brian | TV series |
| 1991 | The Grass Arena | George | TV series |
