= The Sterkarm Handshake =

1998 novel by Susan Price

- Front cover of first edition
- Author: Susan Price
- Cover artist: Mark Edwards
- Language: English
- Genre: Young adult science fiction novel, time travel
- Publisher: Scholastic
- Publication date: 16 Oct 1998
- Publication place: United Kingdom
- Media type: Print (hardcover)
- Pages: 370 (first edition)
- ISBN: 0590543016
- OCLC: 245654803
- LC Class: PZ7.P9317 Sp 2000
- Followed by: A Sterkarm Kiss

The Sterkarm Handshake is a young-adult science fiction novel by Susan Price, published by Scholastic UK in 1998. It features time travel between 21st-century and 16th-century Britain and conflict between FUP and the Sterkarms, a modern corporation and a Scottish clan. Price won the Guardian Children's Fiction Prize, a once-in-a-lifetime book award judged by a panel of British children's writers. The novel was also one of five finalists for the Carnegie Medal from the British Library Association.

HarperCollins published the first U.S. edition in 2000. In the next few years it was published in Norwegian, Italian, and German translations.

== Plot introduction ==
A British corporation creates a Time Tube back to the 16th Century Scottish-English border, initially planning to exploit its untouched mineral resources. The 21st-century travellers represent themselves as magical Elves, and attempt to win the co-operation of the local clan, the Sterkarms.

== Title ==
A "Sterkarm handshake" refers to the treachery of the left-handed Sterkarms, who would offer a right hand to shake in apparent friendship while still wielding a weapon in the left hand.

== Plot summary ==
The Sterkarm Handshake deals with a British corporation, the FUP, who create a Time Tube back to the 16th Century Scottish-English border, initially to exploit its then untouched mineral resources of gold and oil, though they later plan a tourist resort. They fatally underestimate the natives. A local clan, the Sterkarms, are welcoming at first, regarding the 21st-century travellers as magical Elves because of their medicine and technology, but increasingly refuse to cooperate. The clansmen, who have always lived by plunder, begin robbing the FUPs, which leads to the FUP's power-hungry boss kidnapping the only son of the Sterkarm chieftain. The Sterkarms' retaliation is savage.

A young 21st-century anthropologist, Andrea Mitchell, who lives with the Sterkarms as a translator and liaison, finds her loyalties divided when she falls in love with Per Sterkarm.

== Sequel ==
Price continued the story in A Sterkarm Kiss (Scholastic UK, 2003). FUP contacts the Sterkarms of a different dimension during a subtly different 16th century. The corporation attempts to manipulate them by reigniting a rivalry with another clan. Andrea Mitchell returns to the past but all the people she knew before are now strangers, including her lover Per.

== Reception ==
Publishers Weekly wrote that "Price's gripping time-travel adventure cleverly imagines a startling collision of 21st-century technology and 16th-century mores."

Covering the Carnegie Medal shortlist for the Times Educational Supplement, Geraldine Brennan wrote,

This stirring, funny and moving timeslip thriller pits 16th-century Border reivers (raiders) against 21st-century entrepreneurs who seek to carry out their own raids on the unspoilt environment of the past. "I couldn't put this down - the best book I've read in a long, long time. A modern classic," said one judge. "It could go very well on adult shelves." The judges have given the lower age limits of 14 for the Cormier and Price titles, younger for the others. But there's no upper age limit for any of them, so enjoy.
