= Rebecca Stead =

American writer

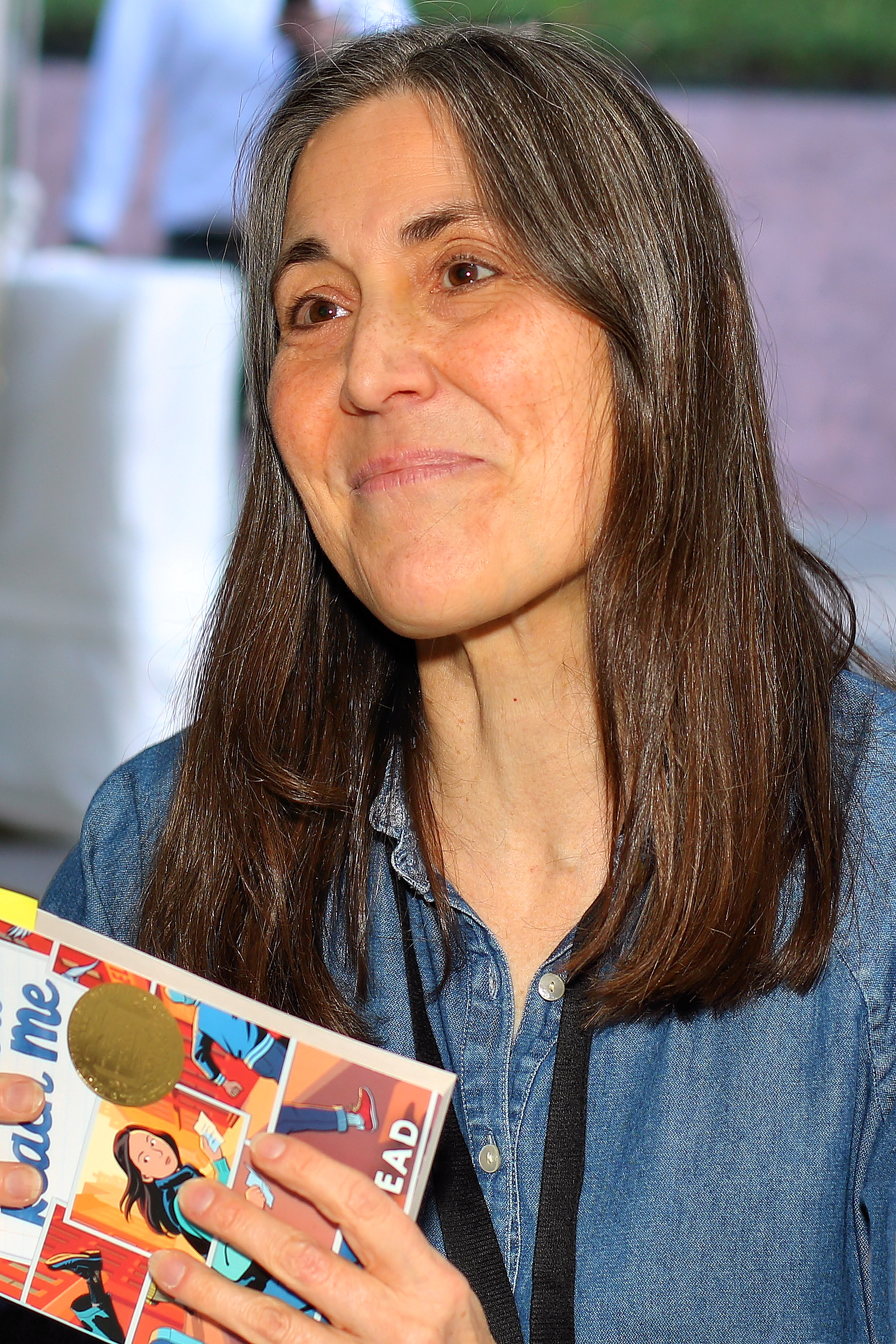
- Stead at the 2025 Texas Book Festival
- Born: Rebecca Stead; January 16, 1968 (age 58); New York City, US
- Occupation: Writer
- Spouse: Sean O'Brien
- Children: 2 sons
- Writing career
- Period: 2007–present
- Genres: Children's and young adult fiction, science fiction
- Notable works: When You Reach Me; First Light; Liar & Spy
- Notable awards: Newbery Medal (2010); Guardian Prize (2013)
- Website: rebeccasteadbooks.com

Rebecca Stead (born January 16, 1968) is an American writer of fiction for children and teens. She won the American Newbery Medal in 2010, the oldest award in children's literature, for her second novel When You Reach Me.

She won the Guardian Children's Fiction Prize in 2013 recognizing Liar & Spy as the year's best British children's book by a writer who has not previously won it.

== Life ==
Born and raised in New York City, Stead enjoyed her elementary school years and fondly remembers reading books in a windowsill or under a table.

She attended Vassar College and received her bachelors degree in 1989.

Rebecca Stead is married to attorney Sean O'Brien and has two sons. She and her family live on the Upper West Side of Manhattan.

== Career ==
Rebecca Stead enjoyed writing as a child but later felt that it was "impractical" and became a lawyer instead. After years as a public defender she returned to writing after the birth of her two children. She credits her son with inspiring her to write a children's novel, but not in the way one would expect. For years she had collected story ideas and short stories on a laptop, which the child one day pushed off a table, destroying what she considered her serious writing. As a way to lighten her mood she began again with something light-hearted — her debut novel First Light, which was published in 2007 by Wendy Lamb Books, an imprint of Random House.

== Critical response ==
In review of her second book, When You Reach Me (2009), Publishers Weekly applaude Stead's ability to "make every detail count" as she creates a plausible conclusion with these divergent and improbable plot lines. The New York Times Book Review called it a "taut novel, every word, every sentence, has meaning and substance."

Stead was awarded the 2010 Newbery Medal by the Association for Library Service to Children for When You Reach Me. According to the chair, "Every scene, every nuance, every word is vital both to character development and the progression of the mystery that really is going to engage readers and satisfy them."

In 2012, When You Reach Me was ranked number 11 among all-time best children's novels in a survey published by School Library Journal, a monthly with primarily U.S. audience. It was the only 21st-century work among the top 28.

Stead won the 2013 Guardian Children's Fiction Prize for Liar & Spy, which was published in the UK by Andersen Press. Stead became the first winning writer from the U.S. – or from anywhere outside the British Commonwealth. Prior to 2012, eligibility had been extended to all books published or co-published in the U.K. (by writers who have not yet won the award).

Goodbye Stranger was published by Wendy Lamb in August 2015. In a starred review (its third for Stead's novels), Kirkus Reviews observed that "the protagonists try on their new and changing lives with a mixture of caution and recklessness. Stead adroitly conveys the way things get complicated so quickly and so completely for even fairly ordinary children at the edge of growing up ... She captures the stomach-churning moments of a misstep or an unplanned betrayal and reworks these events with grace, humor, and polish into possibilities for kindness and redemption."

== Works ==
- First Light (Wendy Lamb Books, 2007)
- When You Reach Me (Wendy Lamb, 2009)
- Liar & Spy (Wendy Lamb, 2012)
- Goodbye Stranger (Wendy Lamb, 2015) LCCN 2014-37289
- The List of Things That Will Not Change (Wendy Lamb, 2020)
- The Experiment (Feiwel & Friends, 2025)
