= Ann Turnbull =

British writer

Ann Turnbull (born 1943) is a British writer of fiction for children and young adults. Her work includes Pigeon Summer, a novel set in a Midlands mining town during the Great Depression of the 1930s which is about a young girl named Mary Dyer, and No Shame, No Fear, a novel for young adults that depicts the persecution of Quakers during the 1660s, and is set in both Shropshire and London and was shortlisted for the Guardian Children's Fiction Prize. Pigeon Summer was nominated for the Nestle Smarties Book Prize and No Shame, No Fear was nominated for the Whitbread Book Award. She has written a number of picture books but the best known is The Sand Horse which is illustrated by Michael Foreman.

== Bibliography ==
=== Older fiction ===
==== Quaker trilogy ====
- No Shame, No Fear (2003)
- Forged in the Fire (2006)
- Seeking Eden (2012)

==== Other novels ====
- Alice in Love and War (2009)
- In That Time of Secrets (2018)

=== Middle years fiction ===
==== Pigeon Summer trilogy ====
- Pigeon Summer (1992) (published in the United States as Speedwell)
- No Friend of Mine (1994)
- Room for a Stranger (1996)

==== Other novels ====
- The Frightened Forest (1974)
- The Wolf King (1975)
- Maroo of the Winter Caves (1984)
- Summer of the Cats (1987)
- Trouble with Bats (1989)
- The Lost Spaceship (1990)
- Deep Water (1996)
- A Long Way Home (1997)
- House of Ghosts (2000)
- Gunner's Boy (2002)

Series contributed to

- Girls with a Voice (originally Mary Ann and Miss Mozart) (2007) (adopted the current title in 2018)
- Girls at War (originally Josie Under Fire (2004) (adopted the current title in 2019)

part of the 6 Chelsea Walk series (originally published as Historical House)

==== Short story collection ====
- Greek Myths (2010)

=== Younger fiction ===
==== Novels ====
- The Fairy Cow (1998)
- The Serpent's Cave (2000)

==== Picture books ====
- Never a Witch's Cat (1989)
- The Queen Cat (1989)
- The Sandhorse (1989)
- Make It, Break It (1990)
- Rob Goes A-Hunting (1990)
- There's a Monster Under My Bed (1990)
- A Flying Day (1991)
- The Tapestry Cats (1992)
- Too Tired (1993)
- The Last Wolf (1995)
- The Sleeping Beauty (1997)

==== Chapter books ====
- Plague: A Cross on the Door (2013)
- The Great Fire: A City in Flames (2013)
- The Gunpowder Plot: A Time for Treason (2014)
