= The Road of the Dead =

2006 novel by Kevin Brooks

- British book cover
- Author: Kevin Brooks
- Language: English
- Genre: Crime novel
- Published: 2006 by Chicken House Publishing
- Publication place: United Kingdom
- Media type: Print
- Pages: 292 pp
- ISBN: 978-1-9044-4275-2
- OCLC: 225413789
- LC Class: PZ7.B7965

The Road of the Dead is a 2006 novel by Kevin Brooks about teenage brothers living in London who travel to the moorland in search of their sister's killer. It was shortlisted for the 2007 Carnegie Medal. The American Library Association named it as one of the Best Books for Young Adults in 2007.

== Plot ==
The Road of the Dead opens as 14-year-old Ruben and 17-year-old Cole, half gypsy half English brothers, learn about their older sister's rape and murder. Determined to bring closure to their family, they travel to Lychcombe to collect her body. What begins as a simple task to bring her body home branches out into a quest for revenge when they learn that the murderer must be caught before they can bury Rachel.

Slowly the brothers begin to uncover a plot in Lychcombe, involving the planned installation of a new hotel and vacation resort and several landowners who don't want to sell. Tragically, they discover that Rachel's murder was the result of an accident/miscommunication. However, the brothers are still determined to find and catch her killer.

When the brothers discover that the killer has already been murdered himself for his mistake, they set out to find his body, the only way they can link him to Rachel. They soon find themselves involved with local gypsies, small town politics and the town's unofficial leader who's not going to give in without a fight.
