= Now Is Good =

2012 film by Ol Parker

- UK theatrical release poster
- Directed by: Ol Parker
- Screenplay by: Ol Parker
- Based on: Before I Die by Jenny Downham
- Produced by: Graham Broadbent; Pete Czernin
- Starring: Dakota Fanning; Jeremy Irvine; Paddy Considine; Olivia Williams; Kaya Scodelario
- Cinematography: Erik Wilson
- Edited by: Peter Lambert
- Music by: Dustin O'Halloran
- Production companies: Blueprint Pictures; BBC Films; BFI; Lipsync Productions; Rising Sun Film; TF1 Droits Audiovisuel
- Distributed by: Warner Bros. Pictures (United Kingdom and Ireland); StudioCanal (France)
- Release dates: 31 August 2012 (Chichester International Film Festival); 19 September 2012 (United Kingdom)
- Running time: 103 minutes
- Countries: United Kingdom; France
- Language: English
- Box office: $2.3 million

Now Is Good is a 2012 teen romantic drama film written and directed by Ol Parker, based on the 2007 novel Before I Die by Jenny Downham. The film, which stars Dakota Fanning, Jeremy Irvine and Paddy Considine, centres on Tessa, a teenage girl who is dying of leukaemia and tries to enjoy her remaining life as much as she possibly can.

The film was released in cinemas in the United Kingdom on 19 September 2012 by Warner Bros. Pictures.

== Plot ==
Tessa is 17 years old with terminal acute lymphoblastic leukaemia. Aided by her best friend, Zoey, she fulfils an undisclosed bucket list before her impending death. One night, both attempt to engage in sex with two boys they pick up in a club.

Tessa goes on a radio talk show with her overbearing father in which she pokes fun at her terminal diagnosis and approaches it with humour. Tessa is loving and caring towards her brother Cal towards whom she feels guilty for stealing her parents' attention and gives him days that are all about him while dealing with her father trying to treasure every moment with his daughter. Her mother is supportive but rarely there for her. Tessa gets the last of her chemotherapy equipment removed from her body so that she can live the rest of her days normally. She meets her new neighbour Adam, who is taking care of his handicapped widowed mother and putting his own life on hold such as going to university, and Tessa instantly befriends him. Adam joins Tessa and Zoey on their adventures, and he takes care of both of them while they take hallucinogenic mushrooms before going into the forest and finding great cliffs, followed by going to a party at which Tessa and Adam start developing feelings for each other. Tessa and Zoey continue to fulfil Tessa's bucket list by stealing from a store, but after being caught, Tessa discovers that Zoey stole a pregnancy test, which suggests that she may be pregnant.

Tessa and Adam go to the beach together and begin a romantic relationship. Tessa introduces Adam to her father, who disapproves of the relationship because Tessa's health is currently in steep decline after she stopped chemotherapy. He tells Adam that Tessa's condition will get worse and that Adam will not be up to it. Tessa takes Zoey to a clinic. Zoey's pregnancy is confirmed, with Zoey not sure if she will keep the baby.

Tessa and Adam attempt to go on a regular date, but Tessa breaks out in a huge nose bleed that leads to her hospitalisation. Adam freezes, which leaves Tessa's mother to take her to hospital. While she is hospitalised, Adam begins painting her name all over the city so that when Tessa leaves the hospital, she can see her name is all over the city. That will fulfil one of her bucket list items that everyone will know she existed and leave Tessa satisfied and smiling. Zoey reveals to Tessa she is keeping the baby, which will be due in April. Tessa and Adam begin spending every night together so that Tessa will not be alone at night anymore; however, Tessa's father refuses the request because of their age and what Tessa is going through although he relents after Tessa reveals she is willing to take the risk despite the burden coming from her impending death.

Tessa visits her doctor, who tells her that her cancer is causing her immune system to collapse and her life will soon end. She will not make it to April to see Zoey's baby being born. Tessa leaves to find Adam who can comfort her, but she finds out that Adam went to an orientation day for a university that he is planning on attending in the autumn. Tessa has a complete meltdown in her room and smashes it up, which reveals the bucket list painted on her wall that had been hidden by a blanket. Her father comes home and sees the list, in which causes him to break down because she excluded him when he wanted to spend as much time with her as possible. Tessa comforts and apologises to him. She escapes to the seaside cliffs, where Adam finds her, and they have a cathartic moment together. Tessa gives Adam her blessing to fall in love at university after her death.

Tessa's health begins to deteriorate rapidly, and her nurse tells her that she will die within days. Tessa spends her last days dozing in and out of consciousness because of the drugs and spends her last days with Adam, her father, her mother, and her brother. She has a series of daydreams in which she lives a healthy happy life with Adam and her family. The daydreams are cut short with her family saying their final goodbyes to a barely conscious Tessa. Then follows another daydream of a healthy Tessa and Adam together on the ocean cliffs and then one with Tessa lying peacefully with Adam (presumably peacefully passing away in Adam's arms) and one final daydream of Tessa meeting Zoey's baby with the final monologue that "life is a series of moments. Let them go. Moments all gathering toward this one" with a healthy smiling Tessa holding Zoey's newborn baby girl.

== Cast ==
- Dakota Fanning as Tessa Scott
- Jeremy Irvine as Adam
- Paddy Considine as Tessa's father
- Olivia Williams as Tessa's mother
- Edgar Canham as Cal Scott, Tessa's brother
- Kaya Scodelario as Zoey Walker, Tessa's friend
- Rose Leslie as Fiona
- Joe Cole as Scott
- Sarah Hadland as Caroline
- Patrick Baladi as Richard
- Franz Drameh as Tommy
- Susan Brown as Shirley
- Rakie Ayola as Phillipa
- Julia Ford as Sally
- Tom Kane as Paul
- Isabella Laughland as Beth
- Josef Altin as Jake
- Morgan Watkins as Nurse
- Kris Vincent as Passerby

== Reception ==
Now Is Good received mixed reviews from critics when it was released in September 2012. The Guardian awarded it two out of five stars and said that it "never really rises above being a collection of clichés, despite some decent performances". Empire awarded it three out of five stars and called it an "uneven but ultimately effective weepie with terrific turns from Considine and Williams, who outshine the younger cast". The Birmingham Mail noted, "If you're a fan of Nicholas Sparks' films – or fancy a good old weep in the cinema – then you could do worse than see this movie". Total Film awarded it three out of five stars and stated "You'll be in bits, but your critical faculties might weep too". Norwich Evening News stated, "The film avoids all the sentimentality and gives you moments that seem realistic but it doesn't lose sight of the fact, while that it is a weepie, it is still an entertainment".

The review aggregation website Rotten Tomatoes gave the film a score of 58% based on reviews from 26 critics.
