= Liar & Spy =

Book by Rebecca Stead

- 1st (American) edition, hardcover dustjacket
- Author: Rebecca Stead
- Cover artist: Yan Nascimbene (hc); Mary Kate McDevitt (pb)
- Language: English
- Genre: Children's novel
- Published: August 7, 2012
- Publisher: Wendy Lamb Books
- Publication place: United States
- Pages: 217
- Awards: Newbery Medal
- ISBN: 978-0-385-73743-2
- Website: Official website

Liar & Spy is a children's novel written by Rebecca Stead published in 2012 that is set in Brooklyn and describes the adventures of Georges and Safer, two middle school students who are working to unmask a suspected spy in their building. At the same time, Georges is experiencing a casual bullying that adults in his life seem to minimize. Stead was the first American author to win the Guardian Children's Fiction Prize for Liar & Spy, in 2013.

== Plot summary ==
The day that Georges (with a silent s, named for Georges Seurat) moves from a house to an apartment with his family, he sees a boy walking two dogs, disappearing into a locked door under the lobby stairs. Georges's family moved because his father, an architect, was laid off from his job, which gives him an opportunity to start his own business. As they are unpacking and throwing away extra material in the basement, Georges sees a hand-lettered sign advertising "Spy Club Meeting—TODAY!" When he returns to the basement later to attend the meeting, he first meets Candy and then her older brother Safer, who is the mysterious twelve-year-old boy who was walking the dogs earlier. Safer suspects one of the residents of their building, who Safer has dubbed Mr. X, "is almost definitely up to something evil" because he only dresses in black and is always moving suitcases in and out of the apartment building. The novel details Safer's efforts to unmask the shadowy Mr. X while Georges continues to struggle with bullying.

== Development ==
The bullying that Georges faces is similar to Stead's experience when she started middle school. "I feel like there are stages in many, many people’s childhoods when you don’t have one good friend like [I had]. It can happen a lot in sixth and seventh grade because that’s when things are changing so quickly. It’s like a desperate dash for some kind of acceptable identity, and it can get ugly." The novel is dedicated to Stead's close friend from middle school.

The in-class science experiment described in the novel is the so-called "supertaster" experiment, which determines the subject's genetically linked sensitivity to phenylthiocarbamide (PTC). Stead recalls that she was not sensitive to the taste, and that since the only other student in her class that was not sensitive was also a boy she had a crush on, she used the myth that said the test determines soul mates in Liar & Spy.

L puts Georges through a spy apprenticeship that was inspired by the plot of Jennifer, Hecate, Macbeth, William McKinley, and Me, Elizabeth by E.L. Konigsberg.

=== Publication history ===
- — (August 7, 2012). Liar & Spy (1st, hc ed.). Wendy Lamb Books. ISBN 978-0-385-73743-2.
- — (August 7, 2012). Liar & Spy (1st, library ed.). Wendy Lamb Books. ISBN 978-0-385-90665-4.
- — (August 7, 2012). Liar & Spy (ebook ed.). Wendy Lamb Books. ISBN 978-0-375-89953-9.
- — (August 6, 2013). Liar & Spy (1st pbk ed.). Wendy Lamb Books. ISBN 978-0-375-85087-5.

== Reception ==
Lucinda Rosenfeld, reviewing for The New York Times, wrote "Stead has such a fine grasp on the alternately base and fanciful preoccupations of seventh graders that even the occasional forays into capital-C Cuteness get a pass."

=== Awards ===
Rebecca Stead won the 2013 Guardian Children's Fiction Prize, the first American author to do so, and Liar & Spy was shortlisted for the Carnegie Medal in 2014. School Library Journal named the novel to one of its Best Books of 2012.

== See also ==
- Harriet the Spy (1964), by Louise Fitzhugh
- The Thief, by Megan Whalen Turner
- Dani Noir, by Nova Ren Suma
