= Candy (Brooks novel) =

2005 novel by Kevin Brooks

- First edition
- Author: Kevin Brooks
- Cover artist: Steve Wells
- Language: English
- Genre: Fiction
- Set in: London
- Publisher: The Chicken House
- Publication date: January 3, 2005
- Publication place: England
- Media type: Print
- Pages: 368
- Awards: Angus Book Award
- ISBN: 978-1-910002-02-5

Candy is a 2005 young adult novel by Kevin Brooks about a doomed teenage love affair between a musician and a prostitute.

== Plot summary ==
The story opens when Joe Beck, a music lover with a knack for curiosity, meets 16-year-old Candy on the streets of London. Joe soon learns that Candy is not only a runaway from her home town, but also a teenage prostitute and heroin addict. He immediately becomes infatuated with her.

The pair begin dating cautiously, visiting London Zoo once. Candy also comes to a gig that Joe and his band, The Katies, play at a local club. However, Candy's pimp, Iggy, feels that Joe is a threat, worrying that Joe will reduce the business Candy takes in and thus reducing Iggy's income. When Joe finds Candy beaten, the pair attack Iggy and leave the city to hide and to ease Candy off heroin.

Iggy subsequently kidnaps Joe's older sister Gina, and uses her as a bargaining chip, claiming he will free her if Candy is returned to him. At the novel's climax, Joe, Candy, Joe's sister, and her boyfriend confront Iggy at Joe's family's remote country house. Candy stabs Iggy in the neck, concluding the novel's main story. Candy is sent off to a rehab centre for adolescents where Joe has a final meeting with her. Candy apologizes for everything and is taken away. Joe is left wondering where she is and if he will ever see her again. The last chapter briefly explains that Joe's band received a record deal and recorded Joe's song for Candy. Joe receives several calls for permission to record the song, but he never answers the messages. Although Joe is not at all upset by this, Candy very much is. In the final scene, Candy cries in Joe's arms, asking why their song was recorded. Did he have something to do with it? Left hanging on the streets all alone when Candy leaves, Joe is baffled, heartbroken, and still deeply in love.

== Characters ==
Joe Beck: Young, naïve and caring, he is the novel's protagonist. Joe is in a band called The Katies, who at the end of the novel, go off to record without him. He is obsessed with Candy and does everything he can to help her with her addiction.

Candy (Candice): A young prostitute, runaway, and heroin addict.

Iggy: Candy's pimp, who controls her life by using her addiction as a tool. He is a violent man, bent on destroying Candy and Joe's forbidden relationship.

Gina: Joe's older sister. She cares for and worries about Joe but is supportive of his relationship with Candy. She and Joe are very close.

Mike: Gina's fiancé. He provides Joe with many favors via connections through his DJing hobby. Has a good understanding of Iggy and his crew.

== Symbolism ==
In a review of the novel, Professor Wendy Kelleher of Arizona State University states that the book focuses on the idea that "From the stories of Eve's seduction in the Garden of Eden to the present, men and women have chased the forbidden, sacrificing everything else in the bargain." Brooks plays with this fundamental, human instinct through the use of Candy's drug addiction. As the story unfolds, language referring to drug addiction begins to describe Joe's love for Candy. The more Joe becomes involved with Candy, the more Joe becomes obsessed with how Candy makes him feel. In the novel, Joe claims "she fired me up and turned my body inside out ... and usually that would have messed me up so much I wouldn't have been able to feel anything, but this time I could feel it." Therefore, Candy's drug addiction mirrors the obsessive love Joe has for her.
