= Lucas (novel) =

Novel by Kevin Brooks

- Lucas, by Kevin Brooks
- Author: Kevin Brooks
- Cover artist: Tony Stone
- Language: English
- Genre: Realistic Fiction
- Publisher: The Chicken House
- Publication date: 2002
- Publication place: United Kingdom
- Pages: 359
- ISBN: 978-0-439-53063-7

Lucas is a 2002 novel by Kevin Brooks about a teenager named Cait who lives on an isolated island off the coast of England and befriends outsider Lucas, eventually falling in love with him only to see the island's prejudices come to life.

== Plot summary ==
The story opens as fifteen-year-old Cait recounts events occurring a year before on her small island home, Hale, which is roughly four miles long and two miles across at its greatest extent. She begins her story by explaining when she first met Lucas, a mysterious teenager who has traveled to the island to explore and live for a short time period. On the same day that she first sees Lucas, her brother returns home and she is nearly assaulted by another islander, Jamie Tait.

However, Lucas is not accepted into the island community easily, due to the discrimination he receives at the hands of the town folk. He works a few odd jobs, but is the victim of attempted assault, forcing him to defend himself and earn a negative reputation. Primarily this comes from Jamie Tait, a university student and popular islander from a wealthy family. The negative behavior escalates when Lucas rescues a young girl from drowning during a town festival, but is met with accusations of molestation.

Lucas is forced into hiding. However, he feels an urge to visit Cait one last time. Unfortunately, Jamie has decided to frame Lucas for the rape, assault and attempted murder of a promiscuous islander named Angel, who had befriended Bill, Cait's old best friend. The novel climaxes as the islanders attempt to capture Lucas, who is innocent of the crime.

When the islanders come to the McCanns' house, knowing Lucas is there, Lucas is told to stay with Caitlyn in hiding as Dom and John (Cait's brother and father) go to talk to the villagers. Lucas and Caitlyn, however, can see what is happening through a crack in the roof. When Lucas sees the villagers continue to protest and threaten the McCanns, he decides to take the problem into his own hands. Lucas says goodbye to Caitlyn and tells her to stay in place. Initially, Caitlyn protests, but then she obeys.

After a few talks with the islanders, Lucas turns around and looks at the hole where Caitlyn is peeking through and waves goodbye, and runs, the islanders chasing him. When Caitlyn sees this, she comes out of hiding and runs as fast as she can just to get to Lucas. When Lucas gets to the mudflats, which is very dangerous, since one wrong step can lead to death by sinking, he does not stop while the villagers stay in place. When Caitlyn gets there, she takes the first step, but does not get through all the way to Lucas, because Dom and John take a hold of her, because it is deadly, leaving Caitlyn thrashing around and shouting 'Lucas'.

Lucas, however does not respond and just steps in one of the mudflats and sinks, leaving Caitlyn.

Caitlyn, depressed, does not talk or eat as much for days. People visit her, though she is still glum and does not mind them much. The police officer comes and gives them Lucas' things and his notebook, saying that everything is clear because of it and Lucas' bad reputation is recovered.

== Characters ==
Caitlyn 'Cait' McCann: Is the fifteen-year-old heroine of Lucas. Cait is a strong willed teenager, who feels alone on the island - her best friend is growing up in the wrong crowd and she does not want to be a part of their toxic behavior. Although she runs environmental charity stalls she is not as interested in that as she appears - she wants life to be simpler with the friends she used to have and that is why she is attracted to Lucas; he is a simple, untainted outsider who has a both pure and animalistic instinct setting him apart from everyone she knows. She tells the story a year after the events occurred because her father, a writer, told her to "cry herself a story", and understand what happened better.

Lucas: The seventeen-year-old title character. Lucas tells Cait that his mother gave birth to him when she was young and Lucas had later left home for mysterious reasons, traveling from town to town. However, we never find out his full, true story and he remains a mysterious character which is part of his persona. He is a soft-spoken character with the potential for danger.

Bill Grey: Bill is Cait's old best friend. Cait misses the 'old' Bill who used to enjoy trips to the library and looked at the world innocently. Their friendship falls apart when they begin to discover the world in different ways; whilst Cait tries to live her life quietly Bill craves attention and sex, alcohol and everything she believes will make her more 'grown-up' and in fact makes her more childish.

Dominic "Dom" McCann: Dom is Cait's older brother who returns from university. At first he is involved in drugs and the island's party scene, but comes to his senses when he realizes how dangerous it is, via Cait.

John McCann: John is Cait's father. He is an author of Young Adult fiction, is Irish and an alcoholic, due to the death of Cait's mother years before. He is in his early forties and supports Cait unconditionally.

Jamie Tait: Jamie Tait is the son of a powerful man in town. Although he is engaged to the daughter of the police captain, he is a sexual predator who threatens Cait on multiple occasions. He is extremely prejudiced against Lucas and like all prejudices it stems from his fear of Lucas, the threat of Lucas being so attractive and such an unknown quantity.

Angel Dean: Angel is the teen friend and sort-of mistress of Jamie, and Bill's "idol". She has a wild reputation for making bad choices and being promiscuous but underneath it all is just as lost, confused and lonely as Cait

Simon: An unsure-of-self boy who works with Cait on projects. Simon has a crush on Cait and Dominic uses this to taunt Cait before Dominic changed.

== Reception ==
Lucas has received numerous pieces of praise from a variety of different sources. The novel has been compared to To Kill a Mockingbird and The Ox-Bow Incident.

Nicolette Jones of the Sunday Times praised Lucas, writing that "it gets to you. Then when this has happened, you want to tell everyone how good it is."

The book also won the Deutscher Jugendliteraturpreis.

== Themes ==
Kevin Brooks deals with a variety of different themes and main ideas in Lucas. Most notably, he expresses the theme of coming of age through Cait's narration. She changes a great deal throughout the novel and there are many references to her being both "an adult" and "a child," referring to her changing personality. More than just coming of age though, Cait seems to develop a better self awareness.

Other themes include how discrimination and distrust of strangers (xenophobia) can have drastically strong influences and that redemption is always possible for those who look for it. In addition, Brooks explores how just one person (both Jamie and Lucas) can have a massively large impact on small communities.
