= Forged in the Fire =

2006 novel by Ann Turnbull

- First edition, 2006
- Author: Ann Turnbull
- Language: English
- Genre: Historical novel
- Publisher: Walker Books
- Publication date: 6 March 2006
- Publication place: United Kingdom
- Media type: Print (Paperback)
- Pages: 304 pp
- ISBN: 1-84428-935-4
- Preceded by: No Shame, No Fear
- Followed by: Seeking Eden

Forged in the Fire is a 2006 novel for young adults by Ann Turnbull, about Quaker life in the 1660s. It is the sequel to No Shame, No Fear, published in 2003.

In Forged in the Fire, Will and Susanna are separated despite their love; Will is working as a bookseller in London, while Susanna stays in Shropshire waiting for Will to return with enough money to provide for her. When the bubonic plague strikes London, Susanna travels there to find Will, but their safety is then threatened by the Great Fire of London.

== Plot summary ==
Forged in the Fire is an epic love story in which love prevails over all. When Will is sent to prison during the plague, Susanna has no way of knowing whether her beloved is alive or not given the time since his last letter. Will gets sent to jail with two of his friends for starting a fight in the streets. Whilst in jail both his friends are infested with the plague and Will becomes deathly ill from what later turns out to be ague. Both of his companions die but Will is bailed out by a man called Edmund who is extremely wealthy and a friend of Nat, who during the story is always at Will's side.

When Susanna finally finds out where Will is located she travels at once to London. There she finds Will happy and healthy in Edmund's home with his eldest daughter. This is the one and only blow to their love but is soon overcome. The two get married in the sight of God at a Quaker meeting.

The London fire is the next huge thing to happen. The city is destroyed bit by bit, and now that Susanna is pregnant she and Will must leave. But Will refuses to leave until he has finished his work in relocating his stock, so he sends Susanna, with friends, to make it out of the city and into a farm where she is to camp for many nights. Finally Will with Nat manage to get out of the city and they are reunited at last. Will also makes up with his father who had disowned him and had never much cared for Will and Susanna's love until then. He gives them some money along with the Heywood family crib for their child and they live happily ever after. A few months later, Susanna announces the birth of their son Josiah and life happily goes on.

== Reception ==
Kirkus Reviews found Forged in the Fire "Lovely" while Inis magazine described it as "an enjoyable, enthralling story. The writing is great and it even manages to be slyly educational!" Leslie Wilson, writing for the Guardian, said "The research, clearly meticulous, never laborious, is part of the muscle and sinew of the narrative. This is a superb book, one to love, read and re-read till the pages fall apart."

== Awards ==
- 2009 Red Book Award (nominated)
