= No Shame, No Fear =

2003 novel by Ann Turnbull

- Author: Ann Turnbull
- Language: English
- Genre: Historical novel
- Publisher: Walker Books
- Publication date: 3 November 2003
- Publication place: United Kingdom
- Media type: Print (paperback)
- Pages: 296 pp
- ISBN: 0-7445-9090-6
- Followed by: Forged in the Fire

No Shame, No Fear is a 2003 novel for young adults by Ann Turnbull. Set in the fictional town of Hemsbury in the 1660s, the novel depicts the love between a Quaker girl, Susanna, and Will, the son of a rich merchant. Their story takes place during the persecution of religious dissenters after the restoration of the monarchy.

In 2006, a sequel, Forged in the Fire, was published.

In March 2007, a stage adaptation of No Shame, No Fear by Charlie Gardner and Lisa Whelan was produced at the Jermyn Street Theatre in London and reviewed for The Stage newspaper.

== Plot ==
In 1662 fifteen year old Quaker Susanna Thorn leaves her village in Shropshire for work in the town of Hemsbury. She becomes an apprentice at a printers and bookseller and continues to attend the local Quaker meetings despite interruptions by the authorities following the passing of the new Quaker act which made such meetings illegal.

Meanwhile seventeen year old William Heywood, the son of an alderman who had recently come home from his studies, noticed Susanna and pursued her and attended Quaker meetings despite being brought up an Anglican. After getting to know Susanna, he falls in love with her and converts to Quakerism causing tension with his father.

William and Susanna want to marry but the meeting does not approve and nor do Susanna's parents, who are now imprisoned leaving her responsible for her younger siblings, due to the William not yet being in a stable job nor able to provide for his potential family. In the end, William decides to go to London with their friend Nat Lacon but intends to return to marry Susanna when he can provide for them.
