= When You Reach Me =

2009 novel by Rebecca Stead

- First edition cover
- Author: Rebecca Stead
- Cover artist: Sophie Blackall
- Language: English
- Genre: Young Adult, Science fiction and mystery
- Publisher: Wendy Lamb Books
- Publication date: July 14, 2009
- Publication place: United States
- Media type: Print (hardcover)
- Pages: 208 pp
- ISBN: 978-0-385-73742-5
- LC Class: PZ7.S80857 WH 2009

When You Reach Me is a Newbery Medal-winning science fiction and mystery novel by Rebecca Stead, published in 2009. It takes place on the Upper West Side of Manhattan during 1978 and 1979 and follows a sixth-grade girl named Miranda Sinclair. After Miranda finds a strange note, which is unsigned and addressed only to "M," in her school library book, a mystery is set into motion—one which Miranda ultimately must face alone. At the same time, Miranda juggles school, relationships with her peers, and helping her mom prepare for an upcoming appearance on The $20,000 Pyramid, a popular game show hosted by Dick Clark. Important characters in the story include Miranda's mother; Richard, her mom's good-natured boyfriend; Sal, Miranda's childhood best friend; and a homeless man who lives on Miranda's block and is referred to only as "the laughing man." Central themes in the novel include independence, redemption, and friendship.

When You Reach Me was inspired by a story Stead read about a man suffering from amnesia, by parts of her childhood, and by her favourite book as a kid, A Wrinkle in Time. After completing much of the novel, Stead gave the draft to her editor, Wendy Lamb. Together, they expanded on the initial concepts and published When You Reach Me on July 14, 2009, under Wendy Lamb Books, an imprint of Random House. The book was well received by critics, who praised its realistic setting and the author's deft handling of small details. The novel reached the best-seller lists of The New York Times, Los Angeles Times and USA Today. In addition to receiving the 2010 Newbery Medal, When You Reach Me won several Best Book of the Year awards.

== Concept and development ==
Stead began writing When You Reach Me in 2007 after an article in The New York Times gave her an idea for a novel about traveling in time to save someone's life. The article was about a man who woke up in Denver suffering from amnesia, having forgotten who he was or why he was there. Many people worked with the man to help him regain his memory. Under hypnosis, he spoke about his apparent wife, Penny, and two daughters who died in a car crash. However, when he and Penny were reunited, the man found out she was only his fiancée — and they had no children. Upon reading the article, Stead wondered if somehow the man had returned to the past to prevent an accident but lost his memory along the way.

"All along, the goal was to be certain that the logic would stand up to the merciless scrutiny of a smart kid. Someone might finish the book and then go right back and start again, reading so closely that she or he would spot any inconsistency. We didn't want to let the reader down."
— Editor Wendy Lamb

While the news story initially inspired Stead, she also tied in parts of her childhood into the novel. She was reminded of a strange old man, dubbed the "laughing man," who lived near her apartment as a child. Besides the laughing man, she included her elementary school, her apartment and a sandwich store where she used to work. Stead also added memories of herself acting mean without reason. Slowly the novel became "more and more about these ordinary mysteries of life and less about the fantastic time-travel-y one".

After developing the basic idea, Stead began researching the science behind time travel to make sure her ideas would be logical. She asked her father — who enjoyed mathematical puzzles — for help with the science and complicated technical aspects. As they talked about time travel, Stead "just kept falling into the same hole with the logic, and he really helped me straighten it out".

When Stead was only halfway done, she hit a wall: she wondered if she had focused the novel too much on her own personal life and problems. By her 40th birthday in January 2007, she had stopped writing. One week after her birthday celebration, Stead went to a writers' conference where the presenter advised attendees to stop thinking and just write. This speech worked as an antidote to Stead's writer's block; she started working on When You Reach Me again. After she had written two-thirds of the novel, Stead sent the draft to her editor Wendy Lamb at Random House. Perusing the script, Lamb found herself absorbed and wanted to help develop the book. Unlike Stead's debut novel First Light, which Lamb heavily edited, Lamb modified nothing on the first draft of When You Reach Me. Throughout the process, Stead helped Lamb understand the complicated concepts in the book and had drafts read by others to make sure "revision hadn't created any holes or contradictions in the plot".

=== A Wrinkle in Time ===
Throughout the story, the main character Miranda is often reading Madeleine L'Engle's A Wrinkle in Time, Stead's favorite book as a child; she read and reread it multiple times. She recalls that L'Engle was the only author she met in her childhood. Stead described the novel as a talisman for Miranda; she included it in the first draft and planned to remove it, "because you can't just toss A Wrinkle in Time in there casually". Her editor suggested leaving it in if it could be better tied into the story. Stead was aware that she did not want A Wrinkle in Time to have too big an influence on When You Reach Me. Keeping this in mind, she reread A Wrinkle in Time through the perspective of different characters, which enabled her to develop new connections and ideas in her own work.

=== Setting ===
When You Reach Me takes place during the 1978–1979 school year of Miranda, the main character. Stead placed Miranda's home on the Upper West Side where Stead grew up. Many parts of the novel explore "the same streets where Stead grew up, and riffs on some of her experiences". Stead was inspired to use this setting because she moved into an apartment near her childhood home early in the development of the story. There she had experienced her first independence while exploring the streets, only to find a scary man (the "laughing man") near her apartment house. Wondering why he was there, Stead later used this encounter as "the anchor as she wrote When You Reach Me".

== Plot ==
M,

This is hard. Harder than I expected, even with your help. But I have been practicing, and my preparations go well. I am coming to save your friend's life and my own.

I ask two favors.

First, you must write me a letter,

Second, please remember to mention the location of your house key.

The trip is a difficult one. I will not be myself when I reach you.

— The first note Miranda receives

Sixth grader Miranda lives with her single mother. When Miranda's mom is invited to appear on the game show $20,000 Pyramid, Miranda and her mom's boyfriend, Richard, begin preparing her for the show in the hopes that she will win and be able to afford a better life. Miranda's best friend Sal, whom she has known since childhood, has recently begun ignoring Miranda after being punched in the stomach by another boy, Marcus.

A homeless man lives on the corner of Miranda's street, dubbed the "laughing man" for his tendency to laugh without cause.

Miranda receives a series of mysterious notes instructing her to write a letter describing future events. The notes, whose writer claims to be coming to Miranda's time to save a life, predict the truth as proof. As these proofs come true, Miranda is intrigued.

Miranda and her new friends Annemarie and Colin hope to get a job at a sandwich shop on the corner. The owner, Jimmy, agrees, but gives them a free soda and sandwich every day in lieu of paying them with money. Miranda, Annemarie, and Colin discover a Fred Flintstone bank in the back of the sandwich shop containing two-dollar bills folded into triangles. When the bank is stolen, Jimmy assumes the kids were responsible and fires them (Miranda later discovers that the laughing man stole it). He re-hires them after they convince him of their innocence, but Annemarie quits when Jimmy says he suspects her best friend, Julia, of stealing the bank because Julia is African-American.

One day, Annemarie suffers a seizure. Julia berates Miranda for letting Annemarie eat sandwiches and drink soda, revealing that Annemarie is epileptic and has to eat a special diet, previously unbeknownst to Miranda. Colin invites Miranda to hang out, but she declines, claiming her mom is sick. Colin later comes to visit Miranda, whereupon they share a kiss before he runs off.

One day, Marcus (with whom Miranda is now friends) confronts Sal, wanting to apologize for his earlier behavior. Marcus chases Sal when he flees, resulting in the latter running directly into the path of an oncoming truck. Before the truck can hit Sal, the laughing man kicks Sal out of the way, and in turn is fatally hit by the truck. Miranda finds the fourth note in Richard's shoe and learns that the laughing man traveled from the future, willingly sacrificing himself to save Sal's life. The note asks Miranda to prepare a chronicle of recent events and deliver it by hand, but she does not know to whom she should deliver them. While Sal is in the hospital recovering from his injuries, Miranda visits him and they reconcile.

While her mother is on-stage on the $20,000 Pyramid, Miranda reminisces about an earlier conversation with Marcus about how no one would recognize a time-traveler from a different age. She suddenly realizes that the laughing man is an older incarnation of Marcus, and needed to deliver the notes to his younger self through Miranda. Later on, Miranda goes to the mailbox the laughing man slept under, where she finds a picture of an older Julia smiling happily. The novel ends as Miranda gives Marcus the letter as the laughing man instructed her in his letters.

== Genres ==
When You Reach Me is classified in the science fiction and mystery genres, but includes features of some other genres. Monica Edinger of The New York Times found When You Reach Me to be "a hybrid of genres, it is a complex mystery, a work of historical fiction, a school story and one of friendship, with a leitmotif of time travel running through it." Augusta Scattergood of the Christian Science Monitor wondered, "Is When You Reach Me science fiction? Time travel? A highly imaginative girl's completely conceived experience? Maybe it's historical fiction. After all, it is set in 1979." According to Mary Quattlebaum of The Washington Post, the novel is of the science fiction and time travel genres. Quattlebaum found that, unlike the usual time travel stories, When You Reach Me does not involve "cheesy time travel machines and rock-'em-sock-'em action [but instead] far surpasses the usual whodunit or sci-fi adventure to become an incandescent exploration of 'life, death, and the beauty of it all.' " Both Kirkus Reviews and Publishers Weekly found that despite the book's science-fiction devices, the setting was still "firmly rooted in reality."

Some have placed parts of the novel in the mystery genre. Edinger found that, despite the broad genres, the novel is mainly "a thrilling puzzle". She relates the pieces slowly; clues are found in the story itself, on the map, in words and chapter titles. At the end of the book everything is tied together and makes sense. Ann Crewdson of School Library Journal found that each note Miranda receives foreshadows the next event. Each note is "skillfully" integrated into the novel, along with subsequent clues, until the climax is reached and all the clues come together. Stead's editor Lamb agreed with the mystery genre, in that "there's plenty to wonder about after you finish the book. Just as we wonder why our feelings change so suddenly, or why someone like the laughing man appears on the corner one day." Gurdon of The Wall Street Journal concurred with Lamb, adding that although the novel is clearly a mystery, the mystery itself is not revealed until the end where the last note comes and where everything ties together.

== Themes ==
Aaron Mead found that "the novel addresses the question of how to hold on to old friendships without stifling them, and it insightfully brings out the stabilizing effect that new friendships can have in the effort to preserve or reclaim old ones." He notes that the novel deeply helps children in middle school. Crewdson opines that the book deals with the "intricacies of friendship."

This theme of friendship is explored when Sal abandons his friendship with Miranda after Marcus hits him. Elli Housden of The Courier-Mail found that Miranda is forced to deal with the fact that Sal seemingly abandons their friendship and ignores her for no apparent reason. Scattergood considered the novel an "ordinary friendship story" with Sal ignoring Miranda to find other friends. Julie Long from Reading Time noted how the incident forces Miranda to find new friends and become more active in school, where she starts learning the dynamics of that environment.

Mead noted that "the book builds toward second chances for Miranda's mother—both vocationally and relationally." As the novel progresses, Miranda gives second chances to Julia, a girl whom Miranda initially hates, and Alice, a girl who always needs to use the bathroom but never does. Miranda previously considered Julia "a competitor for Annemarie's affection, and Alice as the weird kid who waited too long to go to the bathroom." By the end of the book, she finds Julia to be Annemarie's friend and discovers that Alice is an insecure girl.

Stead finds that kids today are much less independent since her childhood. She wrote, "[F]rom age nine, my friends and I were on the streets, walking home, going to each other's houses, going to the store. I really wanted to write about that: the independence that's a little bit scary but also a really positive thing in a lot of ways. And I'm not sure that most kids have that today". Throughout the novel, Miranda and her friends often walk around town without any adults. They are even found working in a sandwich store at lunch and walking home from school while trying to avoid the laughing man. While writing the novel, Stead hoped to show her sons the time period in which she lived, "send[ing] them on a little time-travel journey of their own". Laura Miller of The New Yorker found that this lack of independence in today's youth is mainly due to the fact that kids now grow up with adults constantly watching them. Miller noted how, despite the lower crime rate in current times, the "characters, middle-class middle school students, routinely walk around the Upper West Side by themselves, a rare freedom in today's city."

=== Time travel ===
Julianna Helt from the Pittsburgh Post-Gazette found that time travel forms a central theme as Miranda constantly wonders how time travel could be possible. In When You Reach Me, Marcus helps Miranda realize that the three old ladies from A Wrinkle in Time lied to Meg by promising they would return five minutes before they left. Marcus explains:

So the garden is where they appear when they get home at the end of the book. Remember? They land in the broccoli. So if they had gotten home five minutes before they left, like those ladies promised they would, then they would have seen themselves get back. Before they did.

Roger Sutton from Horn Book Magazine felt that the moment Marcus explains this flaw to Miranda is the first exchange that shows the novel to be complicated and mysterious. Quattlebaum noted, "The story's structure – an expert interweaving of past, present and future – brilliantly contradicts Miranda's commonsensical belief that the end can't happen before the middle." Stead explained her view of time travel in her novel, where going back in time is fulfilling the future, rather than changing it. She hoped to make the time travel element logical to show that "Miranda wasn't struggling to understand the seeming randomness and infinity of the universe, but learning that her world has value and that people do care about her".

== Audiobook adaption ==
The audiobook adaption of When You Reach Me was released by Listening Library and contains four disks. In praise of Cynthia Holloway's performance of Miranda, M.V.P from Horn Book Magazine stated that her tone "emphasized the novel's interpersonal aspects". The reviewer found it beneficial that the chapter titles were added to the audio, since they seemed to add more detail about the book, but can be easily skipped over when reading. M.V.P criticized the voicing of Miranda's mom. AudioFile praised Halloway for "a strong reading ... [that] makes listeners curious about this story's nonlinear structure" and for managing the different elements of the story.

== Critical reception ==
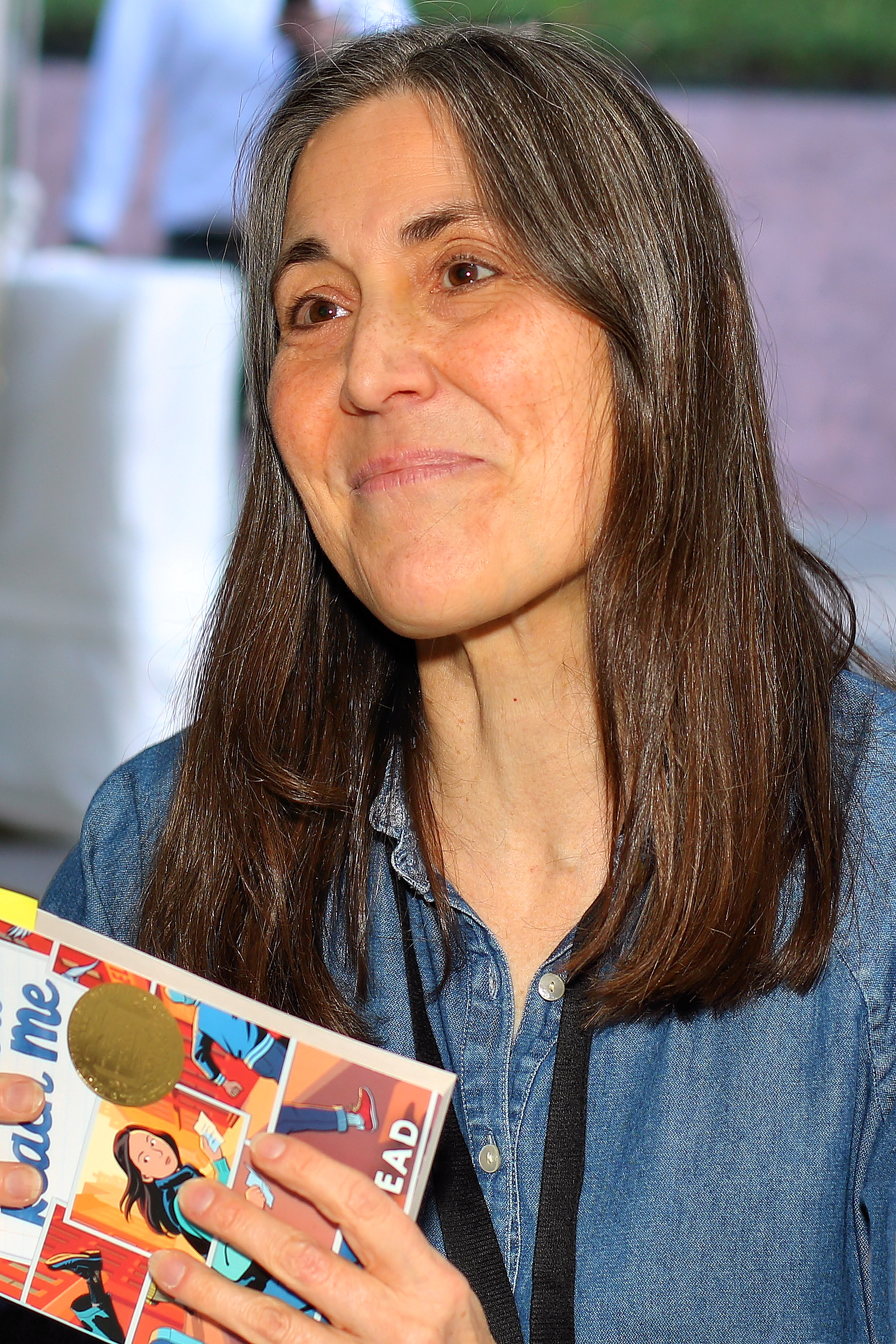
Author Rebecca Stead at the 2025 Texas Book Festival.

When You Reach Me was published on July 14, 2009, in hardcover format by Wendy Lamb Books, an imprint of Random House Children's Books. Reception of When You Reach Me was positive. Reviewers praised the details and characters. The novel has reached many bestseller lists; it was on the New York Times Best Seller list for 16 weeks ending May 9, 2010. It was number 127 on USA Today's bestseller list during the week of January 28, 2010. On April 22, 2010, after staying at number 15 for two weeks, When You Reach Me left the Los Angeles Times bestseller list.

Reviewers lauded the realistic setting and characters. Ilene Cooper of Booklist acknowledged that although she was unsure if the ending was logical, "everything else is quite wonderful". She praised the realistic portrayal of New York and mentioned that "the characters, children and adults ... are honest bits of humanity". Julianna M. Helt of The Post Gazette felt that along with the "wonderful sense of middle school dynamics", Stead's depiction of New York City in the 1970s was superb. Quattlebaum considered no character to be minor; each plays an important part in the story. Caitlin Augusta of School Library Journal found the setting to be "consistently strong. The stores—and even the streets—in Miranda's neighborhood act as physical entities and impact the plot in tangible ways".

Reviewers praised how Stead made every small detail matter. Augusta Scattergood of the Christian Science Monitor enjoyed the detailed work: "The beauty of Stead's writing is found in the way she weaves subplots and settings together seamlessly. Richard's stolen shoe drops into place. A reference to forbidden grapes is tied up sweetly. Stolen $2 bills? Another part of the enigma explained by the end." Edinger agreed, commenting that despite the small size of the novel compared to other popular books, When You Reach Me is a "taut novel, every word, every sentence, has meaning and substance." Publishers Weekly added that even the smallest of details—Miranda's name, her strange habits and why she carries A Wrinkle in Time with her—have a reason for their inclusion by the end of the novel.

=== 2010 Newbery Medal ===
Stead won the annual Newbery Medal recognizing When You Reach Me as the year's "most distinguished contribution to American literature for children". The judges chose the novel for making the small details important to the plot. Chairwoman of the Newbery committee Katie O'Dell felt that "Every scene, every nuance, every word is vital both to character development and the progression of the mystery that really is going to engage readers and satisfy them". The committee was "very excited about this book because it is exceptionally conceived, finely crafted and highly original".

On January 18, 2010, a worker at Random House had tweeted the result 17 minutes prior to the official announcement. The tweet was quickly taken down when the mistake was noticed.

=== 2012 survey ===
In 2012, When You Reach Me was ranked number 11 among all-time best children's novels in a survey published by School Library Journal, a monthly with primarily U.S. audience. It was the only 21st-century work among the top 20.

== Awards and nominations ==
Award	Year	Result
Andre Norton Award	2009	Nominated
The New York Times Notable Book	2009	Listed
Kirkus Reviews Best Children's Books	2009	Listed
Publishers Weekly Best Children's Book of the Year	2009	Listed
School Library Journal Best Book of the Year	2009	Listed
Booklist Editors' Choice	2009	Listed
Newbery Medal	2010	Won
ALA Notable Children's Book	2010	Listed
Indian Paintbrush Book Award	2011	Nominated
Massachusetts Children's Book Award	2012	Won

Awards
Preceded by The Graveyard Book	Newbery Medal recipient 2010	Succeeded by Moon Over Manifest
