= Kevin Brooks (writer) =

English writer (born 1959)

- Born: 30 March 1959 (age 67); Pinhoe, Exeter, England
- Occupation: Writer
- Writing career
- Period: 2002–present
- Genre: Young adult fiction
- Notable works: Martyn Pig; The Bunker Diary
- Notable awards: Carnegie Medal; 2013

Kevin M. Brooks (born 30 March 1959) is an English writer. He is best known for young adult novels. His The Bunker Diary, published by Penguin Books in 2013, won the annual Carnegie Medal as the best new book for children or young adults published in the UK. It was a controversial selection by the British librarians.

== Early life, family and education ==
Brooks was born in Pinhoe on the outskirts of Exeter in southwest England, the second of three brothers.

At age 11, he won a scholarship to Exeter School, where he felt estranged from the other pupils from better-off families and took solace in fiction. He subsequently studied psychology and philosophy at Aston University in Birmingham. His father died when he was 20.

== Career ==
Brooks's debut novel Martyn Pig was published in 2003 by Chicken House, where it was edited by the founder of the company Barry Cunningham, OBE. They won the next Branford Boase Award "for authors and their editors", which annually recognises an outstanding British novel for young people by a first-time novelist.

By a wide margin his work most widely held in WorldCat libraries is the 2009 novel Killing God (titled Dawn in North America). The title character Dawn "contemplates killing God, whom she blames for her father's disappearance". OCLC 301947727 "When Dawn's dad found God, it was the worst time ever. He thought he'd found the answer to everything. But that wasn't the end of it." OCLC 458727901

With A Dance of Ghosts in 2011, Brooks began a series of adult private detective thrillers set in a fictional English city.

== Novels ==
- Martyn Pig (Chicken House, 2002)
- Lucas (2002)
- Kissing the Rain (2004)
- Bloodline (2004)
- Candy (2005)
- I See You Baby (2005) with Catherine Forde
- The Road of the Dead (2006)
- Being (2007)
- Black Rabbit Summer (2008)
- Killing God (2009); US title, Dawn
- iBoy (2010)
- Naked '76 (2011)
- The Bunker Diary (2013)
- The Devil's Angel (2015)
- Dumb Chocolate Eyes (2015)
- Five Hundred Miles (2016)
- Born Scared (2016)
- Dogchild (2018)
- See Through Me (2019)
- Bad Castro (2020)
- Long Road (2024)

Johnny Delgado series

- Johnny Delgado: Private Detective (2006)
- Johnny Delgado: Like Father, Like Son (2006)

PI John Crane series

- A Dance of Ghosts (2011)
- Until the Darkness Comes (2012)
- Wrapped in White (2013)

Travis Delaney series

- The Ultimate Truth (2014)
- The Danger Game (2014)
- The Snake Trap (2015)
