= Bernard Ashley (author) =

British author

- Born: Bernard John Ashley; April 1935 (age 91); Woolwich, London, U.K.
- Education: Trained as a teacher at Trent Park College of Education
- Occupations: Teacher and author of children's books
- Writing career
- Language: English
- Genre: Children's fiction
- Website: bernardashley.com

Bernard John Ashley (born April 1935) is a British author of books for children and young adults. His debut novel, The Trouble with Donovan Croft, published in 1974, won "The Other Award", an alternative to the Carnegie Medal. A Kind of Wild Justice (1978), Running Scared (1986), and Little Soldier (1999) were commended runners up for the Carnegie Medal from the Library Association, recognising the year's best children's book. (Note: Today there are usually eight books on the Carnegie shortlist. According to CCSU some runners up through 2002 were Commended (from 1954) or Highly Commended (from 1966). There were about 160 commendations of both kinds in 49 years including three for 1978 and four for 1986 (one highly commended).) The first two have been reissued by OUP in their Children's Modern Classics series, the third re-issued in a 15th anniversary edition. Ashley's TV drama Dodgem (based on his own novel) won the Royal Television Society Award for Best Entertainment programme (BBC) in 1993.

== Biography ==
Born in Woolwich, south London, Ashley trained as a teacher at Trent Park College of Education after his National Service in the RAF. His teaching career included thirty years as headteacher, his most recent schools being in south and east London, experience which gave the setting for many of his stories. He has recently been awarded an honorary Doctorate in Education by the University of Greenwich and an honorary Doctorate in Letters by the University of Leicester.

In the early sixties, Ashley completed an account of the lifeboat service for children, The Men and the Boats, first in the Serving Our Society series published by Allman & Son. Another in the SOS series was his Weather Men (1971), about the meteorological service.

He is now working full-time as a writer. His children's books present a gritty realism that children identify with, which provides a context for empathy and compassion for the underdog, and a desire for decency, justice and morality. They are often set in urban environments plagued by poverty and crime. Some are set in wartime, including his 24th full-length novel for young people, Shadow of the Zeppelin (2014), and his 25th, Dead End Kids (2015). His latest novel is "Does She Dare?' (Troika 2017) set in 1911 featuring a young feminist hero.

== Selected works ==
- The Men and the Boats: Britain's Lifeboat Service (London: Allman, 1968) – ISBN 0-204-79372-6
- Dave (1971)
- The Trouble with Donovan Croft (1974) – ISBN 978-0-19-275556-8 or ISBN 0-19-271888-6
- Terry on the Fence (1975)
- All My Men (1977)
- A Kind of Wild Justice (1978) – ISBN 0-19-271889-4
- Break in the Sun (1980)
- Dinner Ladies Don't Count (1981) – ISBN 0-14-031593-4
- I'm Trying to Tell You (1981) – ISBN 1-903285-99-2
- Dodgem (1981)
- Linda's Lie (1982)
- High Pavement Blues (1983)
- Your Guess Is As Good As Mine (1983) – ISBN 1-903015-04-9
- A Bit of Give and Take (1984)
- Janey (1985)
- Running Scared (1986)
- Clipper Street: Calling for Sam (1987)
- Clipper Street: Taller Than Before (1987)
- Bad Blood (1988)
- Clipper Street: Down-and-Out (1988)
- Clipper Street: The Royal Visit (1988)
- Clipper Street: All I Ever Ask (1989)
- Clipper Street: Sally Cinderella (1989)
- The Secret of Theodore Brown (1989)
- The Caretaker's Cat (1990)
- Country Boy (1990)
- Chrysalis (1990)
- Getting In (1990)
- The Ghost of Dockside School (1990)
- Seeing Off Uncle Jack (1991)
- Dockside School Stories (1992)
- More Dockside School Stories (1992)
- Three Seven Eleven (1993)
- Johnnie's Blitz (1995) – ISBN 1-903015-28-6
- Justin and the Demon Drop-Kick (1997) – ISBN 1-903285-98-4
- Roller Madonnas (1997)
- A Present for Peter (1997)
- Flash (1997)
- City Limits: Stitch-Up (1997)
- City Limits: The Scam (1997)
- City Limits: Framed (1997)
- City Limits: Mean Street (1997)
- Tiger Without Teeth (1998) – ISBN 1-84299-196-5
- Hannibal Route (1999)
- Justin and the Big Fight (1999) – ISBN 978-1-85714-404-8
- Rapid (1999)
- Little Soldier (1999) – ISBN 1-86039-879-0 (ISBN 0-439-28502-X US & Canada)
- Respect (2000) – ISBN 0-7136-4946-1
- Playing Against the Odds (2000) – ISBN 1-902260-69-4
- Justin Strikes Again (2001) – ISBN 978-0-14-130769-5

also published as Justin and the Grandad War (2009) – ISBN 978-1-85714-403-1

- Revenge House (2002) – ISBN 1-84121-814-6
- Freedom Flight (2003) – ISBN 1-84121-306-3
- Close Look, Quick Look (2004)
- Torrent! (2004) – ISBN 1-84299-196-5
- Ben Maddox: Ten Days to Zero (2005) – ISBN 978-1-84362-649-7
- Ben Maddox: Down to the Wire (2006) – ISBN 978-1-84616-965-6
- Smokescreen (2006) – ISBN 0-7460-6791-7
- Ben Maddox: Flashpoint (2007) – ISBN 978-1-84616-060-8
- Angel Boy (2008) – ISBN 978-1-84507-814-0
- Solitaire (2008) – ISBN 978-0-7460-8137-2
- No Way to Go (2009) – ISBN 978-1-4083-0239-2
- Ronnie's War (2010)
- Aftershock (2011)
- Dive Bombing (2012)
- Hero Girls (2012)
- Jack and the German Spy (2013)
- Shadow of the Zeppelin (Orchard Books, 2014)
- Nadine Dreams of Home (2014)
- Dead End Kids (2015)
- The Way It Is (2015)

=== Picture books ===
- Cleversticks (1992) – ISBN 0-00-663855-4
- A Present for Paul (1996) – ISBN 0-00-664160-1
- King Rat (1998)-
- Growing Good (1999) – ISBN 0-7475-4149-3
- Who Loves You, Billy? (2000)
- Double the Love – ISBN 1-84121-625-9 (hardback) or ISBN 1-84121-278-4
- The Bush (2003) – ISBN 1-870516-60-5
