= Aesthetica Short Film Festival =

Film festival in York, England

- Status: Active
- Genre: Film Festival
- Date: 3-7 November 2027
- Frequency: Annually
- Location: York
- Country: United Kingdom
- Inaugurated: 2011
- Website: asff.co.uk

The Aesthetica Short Film Festival (ASFF) is an international film festival which takes place annually in York, England, at the beginning of November. Founded in 2011, it is a celebration of independent film from around the world, and an outlet for supporting and championing filmmaking.

ASFF is also a BAFTA-qualifying festival for British short films, meaning short films that are screened may be eligible for a BAFTA award.

The festival is hosted by art and culture magazine Aesthetica Magazine, and is supported by York St John University, London College of Communication and the British Film Institute.

== History ==
ASFF is hosted by Aesthetica, a British art and culture magazine. Initially launched as the Aesthetica Short Film Competition, winning films were included on a DVD released with the December/January edition of Aesthetica. The competition received a significant number of entries, and it developed into the Aesthetica Short Film Festival.

=== 2011 ===
The first edition took place in 2011. The festival brought filmmakers and audiences from locations including South Africa, New Zealand, the US and from across Europe, to the city of York. Among those delivering masterclasses were Mark Herman (Screenwriter, The Boy in the Striped Pyjamas), Ivana Mackinnon (Executive Producer, Slumdog Millionaire) and the Senior Commissioner for Channel 4.

ASFF 2011 received positive feedback and was covered in The Guardian.

=== 2012 ===
ASFF 2012 screened over 200 films across 15 different locations. Masterclasses were held by Danny Cohen (BAFTA-nominated cinematographer of The King’s Speech, The Boat That Rocked and Glorious 39), Barry Ryan the head of Warp Films (Dead Man’s Shoes, Four Lions, This is England and Submarine) and Matt Greenhalgh (BAFTA winning screenwriter of Control and Nowhere Boy). The festival also included screenings, panel discussions, special events and parties.

=== 2013 ===
The third edition expanded the Official Programme, screening over 300 films. Saera Jin, director of the comedy Konnichiwa Brick Lane was in attendance, alongside Curt Apduhan who discussed the making of his drama Anniversary. Manjinder Virk received the Festival Winner award for her short Out of Darkness, which the Observer's Chief Film Critic Mark Kermode described as "intriguing and thought provoking."

Events included a series of masterclasses from Joakim Sundström (Seven Psychopaths), Craig McNeil from Beggars Group, Warp Films, Film4, Channel 4, Alice Lowe (Sightseers, Hot Fuzz) and more. There were also special programmes from BAFTA, Yorkshire Film Archive, and Screen Bandita.

=== 2014 ===
ASFF received BAFTA (British Academy of Film and Television Arts) Recognised status in 2014. The festival was also awarded Festival of the Year by York Press.

Notable films include Alan Holly's Coda, shortlisted for the 87th Academy Awards and nominated for the 42nd Annual Annie Awards, starring Brian Gleeson and Orla Fitgerald. Actors starring in some of the short films also included Adeel Akhtar, Hugo Weaving, Maxine Peake and model Lily Cole.

Guest programmes from screened by Creative England iShorts, Yorkshire Film Archive, Clermont-Ferrand Film Festival, Internationale Kurzfilmtage Winterthur. The festival continued to showcase films in all genres and expanded its programme to include fashion and advertising. ASFF's fashion strand was supported by London College of Fashion and screened films from brands such as Vivienne Westwood, Swarovski, Louis Vuitton, Trager Delaney, Topshop, River Island, Karen Millen, Triwa watches and Hub Footwear.

New events included Meet the Film Festivals, which created a place for filmmakers to network with programmers from across the world. Festivals in attendance included Raindance; London Short Film Festival; Edinburgh International Film Festival; Garden State Film Festival and more.

=== 2015 ===
ASFF celebrated its fifth anniversary in 2015. The festival ran from 5 to 8 November and attracted 20,000 admissions.

The festival's Masterclass series included sessions from BAFTA-winning Warp Films' Head of Production Barry Ryan (’71, Berberian Sound Studio, Four Lions and This is England); Stephen Whelan, Executive Producer and founder at White Lodge; and Price James, who worked previously at Ridley Scott Associates and is a director at BAFTA-winning production company Agile Films. Organisations also included Association of Camera Operators, Rankin Film, Shooting People, National Theatre, British Society of Cinematographers, Studio AKA, Channel 4, Framestore and more. ASFF 2015 also hosted the festival's first Videotheque, enabling festival goers the opportunity to watch all films from the Official Selection.

Winners from each category, plus Best of Fest, People's Choice Award and the York Youth Vote were announced at the ASFF Awards Ceremony on Sunday 8 November.

=== 2016 ===
ASFF 2016 ran 3 from 6 November, taking place in 18 venues. Masterclasses were led by industry representatives from organisations including the BBC, Industrial Light & Magic, and Jagex. BBC Commissioning Editor, Kristian Smith, joined writer of Raised by Wolves Caroline Moran to discuss development and pitching, while actress and writer Alice Lowe (The World’s End, Sightseers) spoke about how to bring a character to life. Events also included new daily Morning Coffee hours at According to McGee art gallery. There were Showcase Screenings curated by cultural organisations throughout the UK, including London College of Fashion University of the Arts London, Plymouth College of Art, University of York, Creative England and Northern Ireland Screen among others.

New for 2016, ASFF partnered with the Northern Film School at Leeds Beckett University to present an award for Best Screenplay in the Official Selection.

The Jury of industry professionals who selected the winners included representatives from BAFTA, Edinburgh International Film Festival and Encounters Film Festival.

=== 2017 ===
Extending to five days, the seventh edition of ASFF screened over 300 films across 18 venues throughout the city of York. The programme featured works from 41 countries. Audiences were given a chance to see several UK premieres with performances from film and TV figures including Martin Freeman, Imelda Staunton, Idris Elba and Nikolaj Coster-Waldau. Masterclasses, networking sessions and panel discussions featured industry representatives from i-D, BBC and the British Film Institute.

ASFF held a collection of exclusive screenings supported by Iris Prize, British Urban Film Festival and Kraków Film Festival.

Best of Fest winners were Benjamin Cleary and TJ O’Grady Peyton for Wave, the story of a man who wakes from a coma speaking a fully formed but unrecognisable language, which also went on to win the Best Drama Award. Cleary was also awarded the Best of Fest in 2015 for Stutterer, which received Best Live Action Short Film at the 88th Academy Awards.

Chris Overton's The Silent Child, a film inspired by real life events, that told the story of a deaf four-year-old girl whose social worker teaches her to communicate through sign language, took home the Youth Award and the People's Choice Award. It went on to win Best Live Action Short Film at the 90th Academy Awards.

=== 2018 ===
ASFF 2018 took place from 7 to 11 November. The programme combined industry-led events with screenings. The line-up included industry representatives from Aardman Studios, Film4, British Vogue, StudioCanal, BBC, Industrial Light & Magic, Dazed, Baby Cow, Pinewood Studios and more.

The eighth edition also included Narrative and Documentary Feature Films for the first time, as a result of many festival alumni progressing to features since first screening at ASFF, most notably director Francis Lee (God’s Own Country). Feature films in competition for the 2018 festival included Akram Khan's Giselle (As part of the English National Ballet), Mark Cousins' The Eyes of Orson Welles and Benjamin Wigley's Paa Joe & The Lion.

ASFF also launched the Screen School VR Lab in partnership with London College of Communication. Screenings were complemented by a series of panel discussions on making and realising VR and 360 film and its ethics, production and storytelling.

Best of Fest was awarded to Ed Perkins for his film Black Sheep, which told the story of Cornelius Walker and the murder of Damilola Taylor, in what became one of the UK's most high-profile cases. The film also received Best Documentary and the Northern Film School Award for Best Screenplay.

=== 2019 ===
The 2019 Aesthetica Short Film Festival ran 6 to 10 November. With over 400 films and 100 industry events programmed, it was the largest edition to date. For 2019, Masterclasses included representatives from British Vogue, i-D and Rankin, as well as Emmy- and Oscar-nominated producers, directors, sound designers, editors and cinematographers such as Simon Chinn, Dick Pope, Tracey Granger and Mick Audsley. Industry insights were also given by Framestore, SKY VR, Baby Cow, Bluezoo, BFI NETWORK, Aardman, Industrial Light & Magic, and the BBC.

Additional events included the launch of ASFF's Industry Marketplace. Over 40 exhibitors were included, from BFI NETWORK, Locarno Film Festival, Creative England, to Edinburgh Film Festival, Sheffield Doc/Fest, Hijack Post, London College of Communication and Festival Formula. The event was a platform for attendees and delegates to engage with organisations from across the sector, including international film festivals, screen agencies, sales agents, global distributors and universities.

Guest Programme screenings from The Guardian, Studio AKA, and BBC Arabic Festival also took place across the festival's run, as well as the return of the Screen School VR Lab, created in partnership with London College of Communication.

Best of Festival was awarded to Sasha Rainbow for her film Kofi and Lartey,. The 2019 festival also included the presentation of the Hijack Visionary Filmmaker Award, which was awarded to Ellie Rogers for her film They Found Her in a Field. The award recognises directors with exceptional vision and a unique cinematic voice, with the winner receiving a post production package for their next short film.

=== 2020 ===
ASFF's 10th edition ran 3–8 November in an accessible online space for 2020. From 9–30 November, the content was available on demand as part of ASFF's virtual platform. The programme included over 450 films and more than 100 live industry events, all available virtually.

Guest speakers include Andrea Arnold (Wasp, Fish Tank, American Honey), Sarah Gavron (This Little Life, Suffragette, Rocks), Jeanie Finlay(Seahorse, Orion: The Man Who Would Be King, Game of Thrones: The Last Watch), Sam Feder (Disclosure, Boy I Am), Glenn Freemantle (Gravity, Annihilation), Paul Franklin (Inception, Interstellar), as well as animators, cinematographers, editors, production designers and representatives from Film4, BBC Films, and Framestore..

Films in competition were released in 6 Strands from 3–8 November, with 10 programmes per day. The strand titles included: Just Another Day on Earth, Humans and their Environment, Connections: People, Places and Identity, Breaking Down Barriers and Keep on the Sunny Side of Life.

Guest programmes for 2020 included: Indigenous Cinema: Celebrating Visual Narrative Sovereignty (Native Spirit FF), Cinesisters: A Platform for Female Voices (Cinesisters), Tales from Isolation (Short of the Week), TransFormation, TransAction (Transgender Media Portal), BFI Doc Society Presents: Documenting Modern Britain (Doc Society), Hanoi Stories (Scottish Documentary Institute), Fresh Perspectives: Making Space for Disability (OSKA BRIGHT), The True Glory: Remembering WWII (IWM), I Still Can't Breathe (Directors Notes, Can We Talk DXB), The Future of AI: People and Data (DC LABS), Iris Prize Presents: LGBT+ Shorts (Iris Prize), Short Films from Brazil (São Paulo Short Film Festival), Perspectives from the Arctic Circle: Norway on Film (Norwegian Short Film Festival).

=== 2021 ===
The 11th edition of the Aesthetica Film Festival ran 2–30 November and incorporated both live and virtual events in a hybrid approach. It featured over 300 films, 100 industry events and 100 speakers. The programme was curated into six conceptual strands: How it was, How it is, How it will be?, Humanity on the Edge, When Life Gives You Lemons, Make Lemonade, Pleased to Meet You, Mirror, Mirror and Nobody's Free Until Everybody is Free.

The programme included a focus on diversity, with industry events and screenings centred on LGBTQ+, communities, Black Lives Matter, women, gender and identity. The ASFF Guest Programmes included focus on 9/11, commemorating 20 years since the terrorist attack. Complementary programmes featured works from Ireland, China, Kenya and North Africa, including Scottish Documentary Institute, Iris Prize, Imperial War Museum, We Are Parable, and Girls in Film South Africa.

The 2021 industry programme included VFX, animation and cinematography, editing, screenwriting and virtual reality. Industry representatives included Sally Potter, Maxine Peake, Gamba Cole, Craig Roberts, Framestore, ILM, Film4, Channel 4, and BBC Film. The festival featured Aesthetic alumni Alice Seabright, Francis Lee and Prano Bailey-Bond. The festival included networking and connection opportunities, and opportunities to pitch projects to Film 4, BBC Film, Guardian Documentaries, StudioCanal and DocSociety.

=== 2022 ===
In 2022, the Aesthetica Film Festival took place in-person in the centre of York from 1–6 November. It continued virtually through the festival's online platform until 30 November. A programme of 300 films was categorised into six thematic strands: Life As We Know It, The Bigger Picture, We'll Cross That Bridge When We Come To It, Who Do You Do?, Be Yourself, Everybody Else Is Taken and The Present Was Their Idea Of The Future. Guest Programmes included shorts from We Are Parable, Queer East Film Festival, Iris Prize, and Scottish Documentary Institute. Showcases from Regents University, York St John University and London College of Fashion focused on filmmaking, authenticity in storytelling and fashion.

Masterclasses included sessions on funding, sustainability, cinematography, and making the transition from short to feature filmmaking. The line-up featured directors, actors and producers including Philip Barantini (Boiling Point), Lizzie Franck (Aftersun) and Claire Oakley (Makeup), and organisations such as Ubisoft, BFI, Framestore, Guardian Documentaries, BBC Writersroom, Ridley Scott Creative Group, and Film4. The industry programme included workshops on VR, 360 film and writing from London College of Communication, London College of Fashion, Gal-dem, and Canon. The festival's Kids' Workshops gave young people the opportunity to direct, edit and make their own films. 2022 marked the first year of Aesthetica Fringe events, including art exhibition Unite. Transform. Create. held at Streetlife York.

=== 2023 ===
The 2023 ASFF took place in York from 8–12 November, across 15 venues. The programme including screenings of films by Ricky Gervais, Maxine Peake, Ben Whishaw and Oscar-winner Tim Webber. There were 300 films in competition spanning 12 genres, organised into five thematic strands: Now, In This Very Moment; Standing at the Threshold of Change; A Journey of a Thousand Miles Begins With One Step; Be Free From Yourself; It’s Nice to Meet You.

For the 2023 event, Aesthetica developed a Games Lab with 40 new indie-developed games to play. It also hosted 20 VR projects in the Screen School VR Lab.

Festival attendees included directors and cinematographers such as Sarah Gavron (Rocks), Mark Jenkin (Bait), Nicolas Brown (1917), Diana Olifirova (Heartstopper) and Kathryn Ferguson (Nothing Compares), to give sessions on their experience working in the industry. The programme of 60 masterclasses and panel sessions included Aardman, BBC Film, Film4, Framestore, Guardian, Industrial Light and Magic, Studio AKA and Ridley Scott Associates.

The Aesthetica Fringe event included a sound installation and film premiere in collaboration with Audible; a photography exhibition celebrating women behind the lens; a display of contemporary film posters; and workshops in printmaking, gaming and film for kids and adults.

=== 2024 ===
The 2024 Aesthetica Short Film Festival took place across the city of York between 6–10 November. The programme included screenings of 300 films and featured actors including Ian McKellen, Mia McKenna-Bruce, Jessie Buckley and Bill Nighy. The films spanned 12 genres, organised into five thematic strands: In the Here and Now; Embracing Transformation; We All Start from Somewhere; The Power of Liberation; It’s a Pleasure to Meet You.

The festival hosted more than 50 masterclasses, panel sessions and workshops, run by industry professionals like actor and video game director Abubaker Salim (Napoleon), screenwriter Matt Greenhalgh (Back to Black), composer Simon Franglen (Titanic, Avatar, Skyfall), production designer Sonja Klaus (Terminator: Dark Fate) and video game design director Ben Furneaux (Call of Duty). Speakers were from companies including Aardman, BBC Film, Film4, Framestore, Guardian Documentaries, Industrial Light & Magic and Ridley Scott Associates.

Guest programmes were curated by organisations from around the world, including BBC Comedy, New York Times Op-Docs and the Iris Prize.

For the second year, Aesthetica Short Film Festival included a fully interactive Games and VR Lab, which showcased independent games and immersive VR experiences across PC, console, headset and smart devices.

Best of Festival was awarded to animated film And Granny Would Dance, directed by Maryam Mohajer, which is a tribute to the solidarity of Iranian women.

=== 2025 ===
The 2025 Aesthetica Short Film Festival took place across the city of York between 5–9 November. It was the 15th edition of the BAFTA-Qualifying Festival. The programme included screenings of 300 films and featured actors including Domhnall Gleeson, Kit Harington, Maxine Peake and David Bradley. This year’s winners — selected from over 300 films spanning 15 categories – represent the very best in innovation, creativity, and emotional storytelling.

The festival’s Masterclass Series offered audiences unparalleled access to industry leaders, including: Peter Straughan (Tinker, Tailor, Soldier, Spy); Jasmin John (Adolescence, Boiling Point); Mick Audsley (Harry Potter and the Goblet of Fire). Industry organisations such as Aardman, BBC, Film4, Framestore, The New York Times, ITV, Industrial Light & Magic, and Ridley Scott Associates shared insights into directing, screenwriting, post-production, and the creative use of emerging technologies.

The VR & Games Lab pushed the boundaries of storytelling through interactive and immersive media. The brand new Podcasting Lounge celebrated excellence in audio storytelling, while the York UNESCO City of Media Arts EXPO highlighted cutting-edge innovation across digital media, visual effects, and design. Workshops for children and teens in filmmaking, animation, and coding nurtured the next generation of creative talent.

The UK Film Production Summit, held at The Grand, York, brought together more than 150 leading production companies, development executives, and commissioners. Chaired by Ridley Scott Associates, discussions explored The Future of Production: Scripted, Unscripted, Film, TV & Streaming, with sessions on AI, virtual production, global streaming, and investment models.

Mark Herbert, CEO of Warp Films, delivered a keynote on independent storytelling and the future of British production, joined by representatives from BBC Films, Film4, Working Title, Paramount, Clerkenwell (Baby Reindeer), Scott Free and many more.

Filmmakers from around the world attended in person, sparking conversations and collaborations that extended beyond the cinemas into York’s streets and cafés. The festival’s international scale reinforces its role as a launchpad for talent on a global stage.

=== 2026 ===
From 4-8 November 2026, Aesthetica Film Festival welcomed filmmakers, delegates, and industry professionals to York from over 60 countries worldwide, showcasing the festival’s significance as a truly international platform for storytelling and creative exchange. Aesthetica 2026 screened more than 300 films across multiple venues, representing genres from drama and documentary to experimental work and immersive VR projects..

The festival’s Masterclasses brought some of the biggest names in film, television and media to the city, including: Mark Jenkin (Bait, Enys Men & Rose of Nevada), Brian J. Falconer (Derry Girls) and Jess Iszatt (BBC Introducing on BBC Radio 1). Industry organisations such as BBC, Film4, Framestore, ITV, Neal Street Productions, Ridley Scott Associates and Ubisoft shared insights into directing, screenwriting, post-production, and the creative use of emerging technologies. Plus, Aardman celebrated 50 years with two guest screenings of their iconic stop-motion animation titles and a masterclass with Director and Creative at Aardman Will Becher.

This year, Aesthetica brought film and music together across a dedicated Music Programme, creating a space where emerging artists could perform, connect with industry and meet new audiences in York. At its heart was the New Music Stage: an all-day celebration of live music at York Theatre Royal. Ten breakthrough artists took to the stage across genres including indie, folk, jazz, hip-hop, alt-pop and pop, offering audiences the chance to discover the headliners of tomorrow. The winners, WineMom, are a four-piece based in Dublin who are stepping their way to the forefront of the Irish music scene. They impressed the jury and audience with their originality and electric stage presence. The New Music Stage connected artists, record labels, A&R representatives, music professionals and audiences, with panels, masterclasses and networking with BBC Introducing on Radio 1, Beggars Group (Rough Trade & Matador Records), GQ, Dazed, Universal Music and more in attendance.

The Radical Listening Immersive Media Arts Trail, created in partnership with Audible, brought three new works by Squidsoup, Steve Messam and Being Now Here into York's public spaces. Using light, sound and interactive technology, the free trail captivated thousands of visitors across the festival’s five days, becoming a must-attend spectacle for the city.

The VR & Games Lab pushed the boundaries of storytelling through interactive and immersive media. The Podcasting Lounge celebrated excellence in audio storytelling, while the York UNESCO City of Media Arts EXPO highlighted cutting-edge innovation across digital media, visual effects, and design. Presented alongside the EXPO, a programme of workshops and talks from York Business School welcomed audiences to hear speakers from Argonon, Creative UK, the Department for Business, Innovation, Science and Trade, Innovate UK, and Screen Yorkshire. Workshops for children and teens in filmmaking, animation, and coding nurtured the next generation of creative talent.

The UK Film Production Summit, held at The Grand, York, brought together senior figures from film and television to York for panels, keynotes and networking, with commissioners and producers from organisations including Film4, Ridley Scott Associates, Sky and Warner Bros. Chaired by Ridley Scott Associates, discussions explored Trends in Storytelling: From Commissioning to Global Franchises. Independent music supervisor Ed Bailie delivered a session on Telling Stories Through Sound, speaking about how he collaborates with filmmakers to bring their soundtrack visions to life and exploring his work across film and TV (Netflix’s Legends, the BAFTA-winning Mood, Terence Davies’ Benediction and Steve McQueen’s Small Axe anthology). Farhana Bhula, Director of Film4, delivered a keynote, offering exclusive insights into the ever-changing industry and what it really takes to get a film made.

== Call for entries ==
The Aesthetica Short Film Festival opens for entries in December and closes on 31 May. The festival accepts submissions from emerging and established filmmakers from around the world. Short films with a maximum running time of 30 minutes are accepted across the following genres: advertising, animation, artists' film, comedy, dance, documentary, drama, experimental, fashion, music video, thriller and VR. Feature films are also accepted across Narrative and Documentary genres, running over 60 minutes.

In 2023, the festival introduced the Games Lab. At the Aesthetica Games Lab, the festival exhibits up to 50 projects. The Lab is a celebration of game culture, design and production, in addition to panels and talks.

== Awards ==
All films in the Official Selection are in competition to receive a number of awards. These awards recognise outstanding talent in filmmaking practice. The winning films are selected by a jury of industry experts, and are presented at the Closing Night Awards Ceremony. ASFF is also a BAFTA-Qualifying festival, meaning short films that are screened may be eligible for a BAFTA award.

Sponsored by BFI NETWORK and Film Hub North, the Polaris Award celebrates the achievements of a filmmaker based in the North of England.

Beginning in 2019, the Hijack Visionary Filmmaker Award recognises directors with exceptional vision and a unique cinematic voice. The winner receives a post production package for their next short film.

Previous winners have gone on to achieve further award success, including Oscar wins (The Silent Child, Chris Overton in 2017 and Stutterer, Benjamin Cleary, in 2016).

=== 2011 Winners ===
Award	Winner
Festival Winner	River Dog, James Muir/Daniel Hunter
People's Choice	Dr Knowgood: The Lion’s Pride, Arnold Zwanenbur
Best Animation	Hasan Everywhere, Andrew Kavanagh
Best Artists' Film	Wall, Michael Barwise
Best Comedy	Tooty’s Wedding, Frederic Casella
Best Documentary	River Dog, James Muir/Daniel Hunter
Best Drama	LIN, Piers Thompson
Best Experimental	Dogged, Jo Shaw
Best Music Video	Amatorski: Soldier, Maria de Gier
Best Thriller	Cleaning Up, Thomas Guerrier

=== 2012 Winners ===
Award	Winner
Festival Winner	The Sugar Bowl, Shasha Nakhai and Rich Williamson
People's Choice	Hollow, Rob Sorrenti
Best Animation	The Jockstrap Raiders, Mark Nelson
Best Artists' Film	Reduction Study: Ping Pong, Joanna Tam
Best Comedy	Photoshopping, Mark Davenport
Best Documentary	The Sugar Bowl, Shasha Nakhai and Rich Williamson
Best Drama	Dylan’s Room, Layke Anderson
Best Experimental	To The Sea, Anna Valdez Hanks/Anna Blandford
Best Music Video	Let It Go, Ashley Dean
Best Thriller	Augenblicke, Martin Bargiel

=== 2013 Winners ===
Award	Winner
Festival Winner	Out of Darkness, Manjinder Virk
People's Choice	But Milk Is Important, Anna Mantzaris / Eirik Grønmo Bjørnsen
Best Animation	Oh Willy…, Emma De Swaef / Marc James Roels
Best Artists' Film	Ma, Imran Perretta
Best Comedy	This Way Out, Staten Cousins-Roe
Best Documentary	Danger Overhead Powerlines, Mia Mullarkey
Best Drama	Out of Darkness, Manjinder Virk
Best Experimental	Man vs Sand, Prano Bailey-Bond
Best Music Video	Call Me in the Afternoon, Czlowiek Kamera
Best Thriller	Lapsus, Karim Ouaret

=== 2014 Winners ===
Award	Winner
Festival Winner	Coda, Alan Holly
People's Choice	The Wolf, The Ship, And The Little Green Bag, Cullum Carver-Jones
Best Advertising	The Directors Project, Ben Marshall
Best Animation	Coda, Alan Holly
Best Artists' Film	Forgotten Memories From The End of the World, Danilo Godoy
Best Comedy	Girl Power, Benjamin Bee
Best Documentary	Herd in Iceland, Lindsay Blatt
Best Drama	Eine Gute Geschichte (A Good Story), Martin-Christopher Bode
Best Experimental	Léthé, Harald Hutter
Best Fashion	River Island x Joseph Turvey feat. Justanorm, Alex Turvey.
Best Music Video	Public Service Broadcasting: Night Mail, Robert Hackett
Best Thriller	Keeping Up with the Joneses, Michael Pearce
York Youth Vote	How To Disappear Completely, Tim Woodall / Phil Drinkwater

=== 2015 Winners ===
Award	Winner
Festival Winner	A Confession, Petros Silvestros
People's Choice	Acoustic Kitty, Jennifer Sheridan
Best Advertising	The Experimenter, Simon Emmerson, Andy Russell, Tim Spence & Phil Robson (Lush Digital)
Best Animation	Somewhere Down the Line, Julien Regnard
Best Artists' Film	Towards the Possible Film, Shezad Dawood
Best Comedy	How I didn't Become a Piano Player, Tommaso Pitta
Best Dance	Primitive, Tom Rowland
Best Documentary	Across Still Water, Ruth Grimberg
Best Drama	Stutterer, Benjamin Cleary
Best Experimental	Drifters, Anu Valia
Best Fashion	Pinch Me for Ted Baker, White Lodge
Best Music Video	We Were Evergreen: Daughters, Dominique Rocher
Best Thriller	A Confession, Petros Silvestros
York Youth Award	Billy the Kid, Sam Johnson

=== 2016 Winners ===
Award	Winner
Festival Winner	Irregulars, Fabio Palmieri
People's Choice	Dust and Resin, Stephen Parker
Best Advertising	Robo-Trumbe, John Wright
Best Animation	Machine, Sunit Parekh-Gaihede
Best Artists' Film	Solo Damas, Callum Hill
Best Comedy	90 Grad Nord, Detsky Graffam
Best Documentary	Irregulars, Fabio Palmieri
Best Drama	Silence, Dejan Mrkic
Best Experimental	Two Signs' Den: Epilogue, Bruno Decc
Best Fashion	Breaking Rules, Victor Claramunt
Best Music Video	Beardyman - Mountainside, Lewis Rose
Best Thriller	Cork Man, Dawn Han
York Youth Vote	Litterbugs, Peter Stanley-Ward

=== 2017 Winners ===
Award	Winner
Festival Winner	Wave, Benjamin Cleary & TJ O’Grady Peyton
People's Choice	The Silent Child, Chris Overton
Northern Film School's Best Screenplay	For Real Tho, Baptist Penetticobra
Best Advertising	#WeBelieveInThePowerOfLove, Luca Finotti
Best Animation	Johnno’s Dead, Chris Shepherd
Best Artists' Film	For Real Tho, Baptist Penetticobra
Best Comedy	Fucking Bunnies, Teemu Niukkanen
Best Documentary	Homeland, Sam Peeters
Best Drama	Wave, Benjamin Cleary & TJ O’Grady Peyton
Best Dance	Lil Buck with Icons of Modern Art, Andrew Margetson
Best Experimental	The Happiest Barrack, Noémi Varga
Best Fashion	The Sleeping Field, That Jam
Best Music Video	Metaxas – Sirens, Savvas Stavrou
Best Thriller	Gridlock, Ian Hunt Duffy
York Youth Vote	The Silent Child, Chris Overton

=== 2018 Winners ===
Award	Winner
Festival Winner	Black Sheep, Ed Perkins
People's Choice	Turning Table, Andrew Muir
Northern Film School's Best Screenplay	Black Sheep, Ed Perkins
Film Hub North Filmmaker's Award	Venus, Faye Carr-Wilson
Best Advertising	Start the Buzz - Milan Fashion Show, Giacomo Boeri & Matteo Grimaldi
Best Animation	Double Portrait, Ian Bruce
Best Artists' Film	Author of Expectations, bielecki & bielecka
Best Comedy	Sex Ed, Alice Seabright
Best Dance	Dances with Circles, Paul McLean
Best Documentary	Black Sheep, Ed Perkins
Best Drama	In Wonderland, Christopher Haydon
Best Experimental	Something Said, Jay Bernard
Best Fashion	C41 Magazine x Adidas Originals Prophere, Leone Balduzzu
Best Music Video	Alon Eder - I Am Sex, Yuval Haker
Best Thriller	Wale, Barnaby Blackburn
Best Narrative Feature	You Go to My Head, Dimitri de Clercq
Best Documentary Feature	Almost Heaven, Carol Salter
Best VR & Immersive	Ashes to Ashes, Ingejan Ligthart Schenk & Jamille van Wijngaarden
York Youth Award	Camlo, Andrew Muir

=== 2019 Winners ===
Award	Winner
Festival Winner	Kofi & Lartey, Sasha Rainbow
People's Choice	Down, Garry Crystal
Film Hub North Polaris Award	Henceforth, Charlene Jones
Hijack Visionary Award	They Found Her in a Field, Ellie Rogers
Best Advertising	NIKE | L'incredibile, LEONE
Best Animation	Roadkill, Leszek Mozga
Best Artists' Film	A Protest, A Celebration, A Mixed Message, Rhea Storr
Best Comedy	Norteños, Grandmas
Best Dance	The Golden Age, Eric Minh Cuong Castaing
Best Documentary	Bright Lights, Charby Ibrahim
Best Drama	Miss Chazelles, Thomas Vernay
Best Experimental	Kindred, Samona Olanipekun
Best Fashion	Lola's Manifesto, Gsus Lopez
Best Feature	Irene's Ghost, Iain Cunningham
Best Music Video	Shahmaran, Emmanuel Adjei
Best Thriller	Madame, Garth Jennings
Best VR & Immersive	Virtual Viking, Erik Gustavson
York Youth Award	Lasagne, Hannah Hill

=== 2020 Winners ===
Award	Winner
Festival Winner	The Fantastic, dir. Maija Blåfield
Hijack Visionary Award	Thinking About the Weather, dir. Gardar Thor Thorkelsson
Best Advertising	Safe Water, dir. Mario Dahl
Best Animation	The Passerby, dir. Pieter Coudyzer
Best Artists' Film	Factory Talk, dir. Lucie Rachel and Chrissie Hyde
Best Comedy	Maradona's Legs, dir. Firas Khoury
Best Dance	The Conversation, dir. Lanre Malaolu
Best Documentary	The Fantastic, dir. Maija Blåfield
Best Drama	The Present, dir. Farah Nabulsi
Best Experimental	Softer, dir. Ayanna Dozier
Best Fashion	Baba, dir. Sarah Blok and Lisa Konno
Best Music Video	Adventure, dir. Zak Marx
Best Thriller	Night Bus, dir. Jessica Ashworth and Henrietta Ashworth
Best VR & Immersive	VR Free, dir. Milad Tangshir
Best Feature (Documentary)	Neighbors, dir. Tomislav Zaja
Best Feature (Narrative)	How to Stop A Recurring Dream, dir. Edward Morris

=== 2021 Winners ===
Award	Winner
Festival Winner	Hanging On, dir. Alfie Barker
Hijack Visionary Award	One Thousand And One Attempts To Be An Ocean, dir. Wang Yuyan
Best Advertising	The North Face X Gucci Presented By Highsnobiety, dir. Fiona Jane Burgess
Best Animation	The Chimney Swift, dir. Frédéric Schuld
Best Artists' Film	Centarium, dir. Aleksander Johan Andreassen
Best Comedy	Taj Mahal Presents… A Short Film, dir. David Dearlove
Best Dance	Blast, dir. Joshua Ben-Tovim & Roseanna Anderson
Best Documentary	Hanging On, dir. Alfie Barker
Best Drama	See You Garbage!, dir. Romain Dumont
Best Experimental	The Bang Straws, dir. Michelle Williams Gamaker
Best Fashion	Rejoice Resist, dir. Elisha Smith-Leverock
Best Music Video	Tesfay, dir. Leah Vlemmiks
Best Thriller	Such Small Hands, dir. Maria Martinez Bayona
Best VR & Immersive	Meet Mortaza, dir. Joséphine Derobe
Best Feature (Documentary)	Bank Job dirs. Daniel Edelstyn, Hilary Powell
Best Feature (Narrative)	The Cleaner, dir. Ta Pu Chen
Best Director	Such Small Hands, dir. Maria Martinez Bayona
Best Cinematography	Such Small Hands, dir. Maria Martinez Bayona
Best Screenplay	The Cleaner, dir. Ta Pu Chen
Best Editing	One Thousand And One Attempts To Be An Ocean, dir. Wang Yuyan

=== 2022 Winners ===
Award	Winner
Festival Winner	Until the Tide Creeps In, dir. Jessi Gutch
Best Advertising	Dirty Money, dir. Sinan Sevinç and Dominik Ströhle
Best Animation	The Clearing, dir. Daniel Hope
Best Artists' Film	A Void, dir. Jordy Sank
Best Comedy	Doffice, dir. David Leclercq
Best Dance	Viscera, dir. Phoebe Davies and Nandi Bhebhe
Best Documentary	Until the Tide Creeps In, dir. Jessi Gutch
Best Drama	Invisible Border, dir. Mark Gerstorfer
Best Experimental	Fireflies, dir. Poulomi Basu and CJ Clarke
Best Fashion	Replica, dir. Hannah Bon
Best Music Video	Mwanjé ft. Samoa the Great – Wildones, dir. Michael Rodrigues & Tarryn Hatchett
Best Thriller	O, Glory!, dir. Joe Williams and Charlie Edwards-Moss
Best VR & Immersive	Glimpse, dir. Benjamin Cleary and Michael O’Connor
Best Feature (Documentary)	The Hermit of Treig, dir. Lizzie MacKenzie
Best Feature (Narrative)	I'll Go To Hell, dir. Ismahane Lahmar
Best Director	The Hermit of Treig, dir. Lizzie MackEnzie
Best Cinematography	Aska, dir. Clara Miro
Best Screenplay	Breathless Puppets, dir. Naaman Azhari
Best Editing	39, dir. Martín Delfino Guevara

=== 2023 Winners ===
Award	Winner
Festival Winner	The Golden West dirs. Tom Berkeley & Ross White
Best Advertising	RNIB | See Differently dir. Jesse Lewis-Reece
Best Animation	Letter to a Pig dir. Tal Kantor
Best Artists' Film	The Song dir. Bani Abidi
Best Comedy	Festival of Slap dir. Abdou Cissé
Best Dance	Spicy Pink Tea dir. Aqsa Arif
Best Documentary	Nai Năi & Wài Pó (Grandma & Grandma) dir. Sean Wang
Best Drama	The Golden West dirs. Tom Berkeley & Ross White
Best Experimental	Thieves dir. Michelle Williams Gamaker
Best Fashion	An Ode to Procrastination dir. Aleksandra Kingo
Best Music Video	Debbie Feat. Berwyn – Cousin’s Car dir. Relta
Best Thriller	Hide Your Crazy dir. Austin Kase
Best VR & Immersive	From the Main Square dir. Pedro Harres
Best Game	Paper Trail, Newfangled Games
Best Feature (Documentary)	After the Bridge dirs. Davide Rizzo & Marzia Toscano
Best Feature (Narrative)	Black Moon dir. Tonatiuh García
Best Director	Safe dir. Debbie Howard
Best Cinematography	The Red Suitcase dir. Cyrus Neshvad
Best Editing	Outlets dir. Duncan Cowles
Best Screenplay	Safe dir. Debbie Howard

=== 2024 Winners ===
Award	Winner
Festival Winner	And Granny Would Dance dir. Maryam Mohajer
Best Advertising	Boubacar dir. Ivetta Urozhaeva
Best Animation	And Granny Would Dance dir. Maryam Mohajer
Best Artists' Film	Beacons dir. Jasmina Cibic
Best Comedy	I’m Not a Robot dir. Victoria Warmerdam
Best Dance	Where Do Ants Sleep at Night dir. Dean Wei
Best Documentary	An Act of Service dir. Brandon Kapelow
Best Drama	Alarms dirs. Nicolas Panay
Best Experimental	You Can’t Get What You Want But You Can Get Me dirs. Samira Elagoz & Z Walsh
Best Fashion	Soulful dir. Callum Lloyd-James
Best Family Friendly	Finding Jia dir. Alice Yang
Best Music Video	Sabali dir. Valentin Guiod
Best Thriller	Syncope dir. Linus von Stumberg
Best VR & Immersive	Finally Me dir. Marcio Sal
Best Game	Sorry We’re Closed dev. à la mode games
Best Feature (Documentary)	At the Door of the House Who Will Come Knocking dir. Maja Novaković
Best Feature (Narrative)	Ciurè dir. Gianpiero Pumo
Best Director	Travel Socks dirs. Tess Annan & Joseph Madden
Best Cinematography	Sabali dir. Valentin Guiod
Best Editing	Dope Fiend dir. Rosanagh Griffiths
Best Screenplay	Does That Make Me a Woman dir. Bec Evans
Andy Jones VFX Award	Benji dir. Oscar Garth

=== 2025 Winners ===
Award	Winner
Festival Winner	The Hold dir. JD Donnelly
Best Advertising	Swimming With Butterflies dir. Karl Stelter
Best Animation	Wild Animal dir. Tianyun Lyu
Best Artists' Film	Mother Company dirs. Alexandros Raptotasios & Konstantinos Thomaidis
Best Comedy	Dating in Your 20s dirs. Lily Rutterford & Lucy Minderides
Best Dance	Spoken Movement Family Honour dir. Daniel Gurton
Best Documentary	The Hold dir. JD Donnelly
Best Drama	El Corazón dirs. Oscar Simmons
Best Experimental	We Will Be Who We Are dir. Priscillia Kounkou Hoveyda
Best Fashion	Fugue dir. Nastassia Nikè Swan Yin Winge
Best Family Friendly	Girls Together dir. Christie Arnold
Best Music Video	Tank dir. Garath Whyte
Best Thriller	Scope dir. Emma Moffat
Best VR & Immersive	Xian’er (Chinese Immortals) dir. Fang Zhou
Best Game	Blue Prince dev. Dogubomb
Best Podcast	Reality Looks Back dir. Anne Jeppesen
Best Feature (Documentary)	Torn dir. Kullar Viimne
Best Feature (Narrative)	Disremember dir. Matthew Simpson
Best Director	Cuerpos dir. Reiff Gaskell
Best Cinematography	Baby dir. Simisolaoluwa Akande, cinematography Scarlett Gardner
Best Editing	No One Really Knows Me Well dir. Gaia, editor Piotr Zuchniewicz
Best Screenplay	Giants dir. Andy Berriman, screenwriter Alex Oates
New Music Stage	Dilettante

=== 2026 Winners ===
Award	Winner
Best of Festival	Don’t Touch the Artwork, dir. Shams Uz Zuha Mansur
Best Advertising	Light Hole, dir. Toru Katori
Best Animation	This is Not a Memoir, dir. Josh Earle
Best Artists’ Film	Don’t Touch the Artwork, dir. Shams Uz Zuha Mansur
Best Comedy	Nobody Barks, dir. Júlia Coldwell Serra
Best Dance	A Sad Woman, dir. Leïla Macaire, Romane Piffaut
Best Documentary	Forgotten Spaceman, dir. Elham Ehsas
Best Drama	Slap!!, dir. Mikolaj Piszczan
Best Experimental	Rusalki, dir. Eva Blackwell-Rogelj
Best Fashion Film	Amberstiche, dir. Victoria Juemei Gong
Best Family Friendly	To Catch a Siren, dir. Raphaela Wagner
Best Music Video	CHINGONA, dir. Rupert Höller
Best Thriller	Bruised Sky, dir. Gary James Kent
Best VR & Immersive	Mirage, dir. Naima Karim
Best Game	Hillthorn, dev. Fool Moon
Best Podcast	The Metaphor Consultant, Falling Tree Productions
Best Cinematography	Alone, Cinematographer Jim Petersen, dir. Shian Denovan
Best Director	Anon, dir. Dylan Brady
Best Editing	To Run is to Return, Editor Andy Sowerby, dir. Precious Wura Alabi
Best Screenplay	You Told Us To Talk About The Weather, Writer Emma-Louise Howell, dir. Harry Tomlin
New Music Stage	WineMom
