= Creative UK =

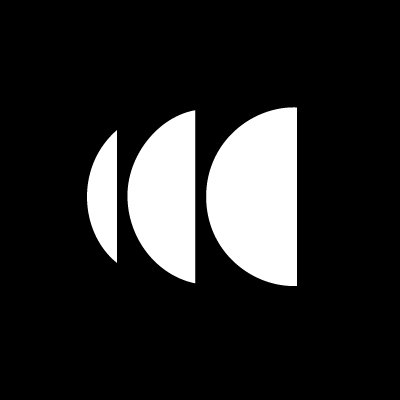
- Creative UK "amplify" Logo
- Founded: 2021
- Type: Film, television nonprofit organisation
- Headquarters: 32-36 College Green, Bristol, UK
- Location: MediaCityUK, Salford
- Region served: United Kingdom
- Chief Executive: Caroline Norbury, MBE
- Chair: Richard Haythornthwaite
- Website: wearecreative.uk
- Formerly called: Creative England, Creative Industries Federation

Creative UK, known as Creative England from 2010 to 2021, is a not-for-profit organisation that supports the creative industries in the United Kingdom. On 24 November 2021, Creative England and Creative Industries Federation combined forces as Creative UK, having previously worked together since 2019 under the Creative UK Group.

== History ==
=== Creative England ===
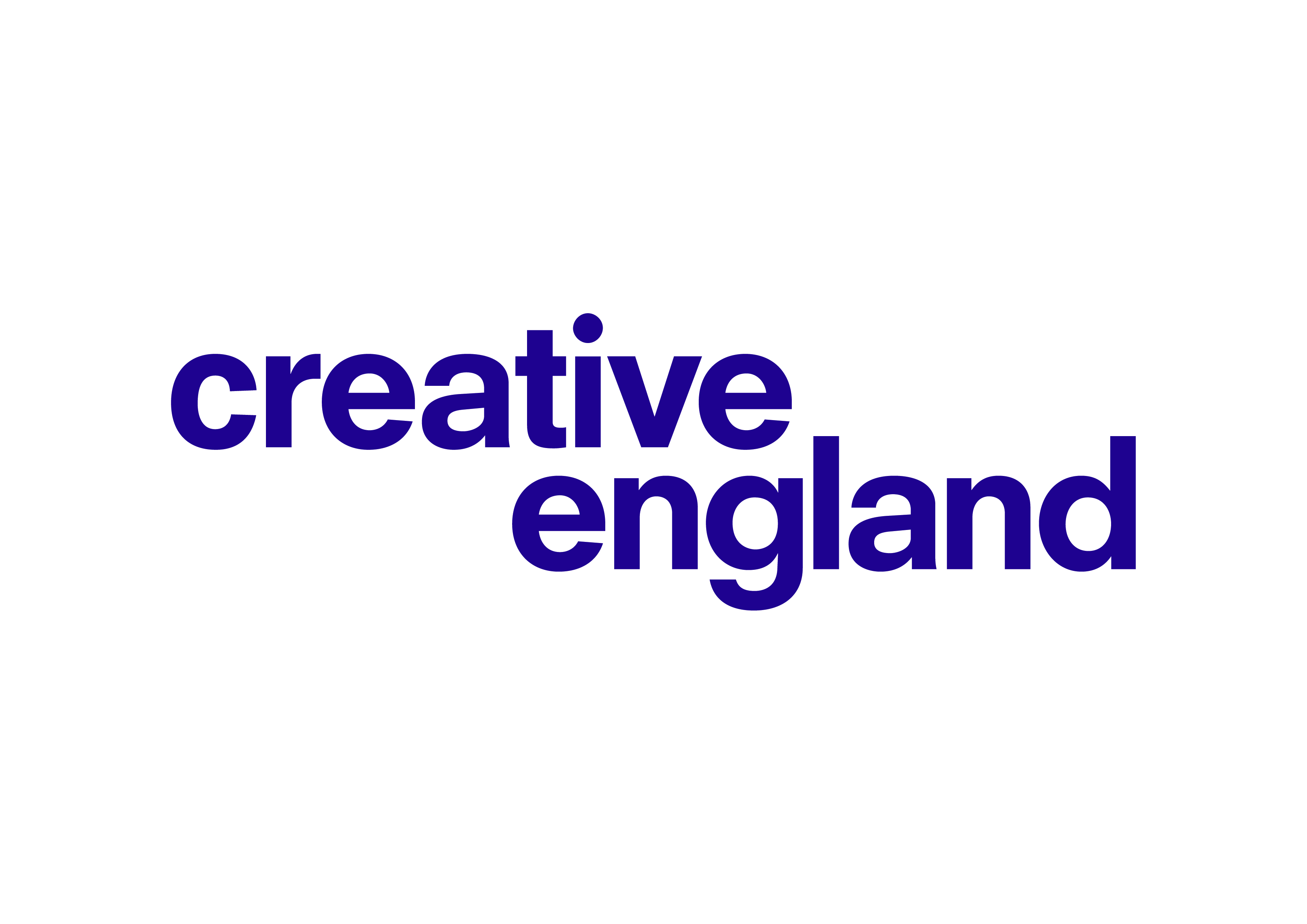
Creative England logo (2010-2021)

Creative England was founded in 2010, formed by the consolidation of a number of regional screen agencies into one body after the UK government dismantled the UK Film Council in 2011. It was funded by both public and private investment and developed partnerships and collaborations with companies including Google, Facebook and KPMG, as well as local authorities, cultural bodies and universities, national government, and the European Commission. The organisation aimed to "support original storytellers, driving diversity, collaboration and growth in the creative screen industries". Creative England and Microsoft launched Greenshoots in 2013, a game development competition which provides funding and market advice from industry experts to the winners. In 2015, Creative England launched a £1m fund, used to support entrepreneurs in film, television, games and digital media in English cities and regions beyond the capital.

=== Creative Industries Federation ===
The Creative Industries Federation was a national organisation for all the UK's creative industries, cultural education and arts. It advocated for the sector, aiming to ensure that the creative industries are central to political, economic and social decision-making.

=== Rebrand to Creative UK ===
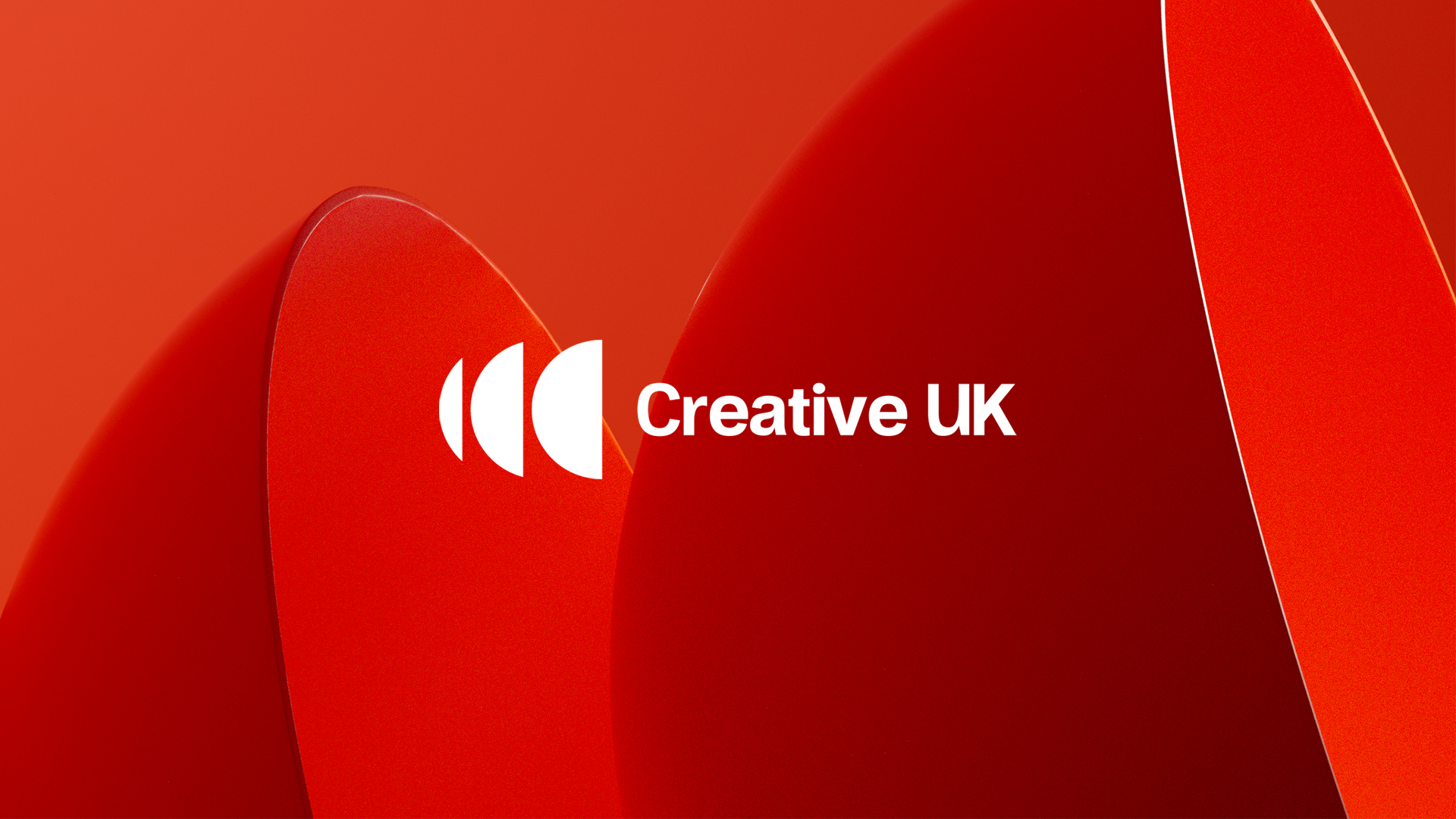
Creative UK full logo

Having worked together under the name "Creative UK Group", in November 2021, Creative England and Creative Industries Federation decided to merge and create "Creative UK". The launch coincided with updated branding across the organisation and a new tagline; "Here for those who dare to imagine".

=== Breakout ===
In 2022, Creative UK's Head of Film, Paul Ashton, announced a partnership with Netflix UK for first-time feature film directors called "Breakout". Participants will be made up of six teams, each of which will receive £30,000 ($40,000) worth of development funding in addition to a Creative U.K. training program consisting of mentoring and residential lab events. Netflix executives will also provide support and input.

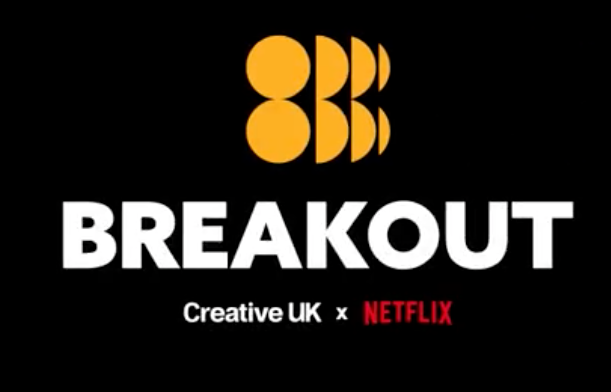
Breakout logo

Following residential workshops, at least one film will be greenlit with an approximate £1.5m budget and a global launch on Netflix.

In April 2023, the first "Breakout" projects were announced.

=== Our Creative Future ===
On 23 April 2024, ahead of the upcoming UK General Election, Creative UK issued a manifesto calling for "radical new action" for cultural and creative industries. The manifesto was entitled "Our Creative Future".

== Description and programs ==
The business promotes the development of creative companies, which in turn support business across games, film, creative and digital media as well as production services. The company works in partnership with the BFI, has offices in Bristol and Salford, and operates predominantly outside of the city of London.

Creative UK currently supports filmmaking opportunities shortFLIX, in collaboration with Sky Arts, iFeatures with the BFI and BBC Films, and Breakout with Netflix. These provide mentoring and funding to emerging film makers.

=== iFeatures ===
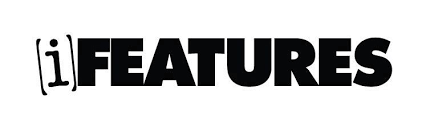
IFeatures Logo

Launched in Bristol in 2010, supported by the BBC and South West Screen, iFeatures began as a way to nurture the cities "most outstanding creative talent" as well as attract up-and-coming filmmakers from across the UK and Europe. The following year, it was launched nationwide.

Since its creation, iFeatures has gone on to help fund 20 feature films, including Lady Macbeth, The Levelling, The Goob, and, flagship film, In the Dark Half.

iFeatures films with release dates
Release date	Title	Director(s)	Notes
10 August 2012	In the Dark Half	Alastair Siddons	Produced with BBC Films; distributed by Verve Pictures and ContentFilm International
12 April 2013	Flying Blind	Katarzyna Klimkiewicz	
14 January 2014	8 Minutes Idle	Matt Thorne	
29 May 2015	The Goob	Guy Myhill	Produced with BBC Films
25 June 2015	Norfolk	Martin Radich	
24 June 2016	Adult Life Skills	Rachel Tunnard	
10 September 2016	The Levelling	Hope Dickson Leach	Produced with BBC Films and the BFI
28 April 2017	Lady Macbeth	William Oldroyd	distributed by Altitude Film Distribution
19 May 2017	Spaceship	Alex Taylor	
1 September 2017	God's Own Country	Francis Lee	Distributed by Picturehouse Entertainment
8 September 2017	Apostasy	Daniel Kokotajlo (director)	Distributed by Gravitas Ventures
21 June 2018	Eaten by Lions	Jason Wingard	
13 July 2018	Pin Cushion	Deborah Haywood	
24 January 2019	The Last Tree	Shola Amoo	Produced with the BFI
3 October 2019	Perfect 10	Eva Riley	Produced with BBC Films
4 October 2019	Make Up	Claire Oakley	
17 March 2021	Here Before	Stacey Gregg	Produced with BBC Films and Northern Ireland Screen
8 October 2022	Blue Jean	Georgia Oakley	https://www.wearecreative.uk/support/film-tv/ifeatures/

=== shortFLIX ===
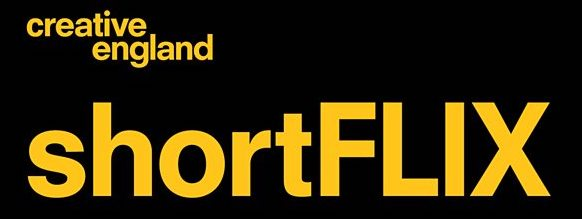
ShortFLIX logo

Shortflix (stylised as 'shortFLIX') is an initiative for new filmmakers aged 18–25 to make short films for broadcast on Sky Arts, its focus being those who have had fewer opportunities to get started in filmmaking, including those who are currently underrepresented in the industry.

Partnered with the BFI and National Youth Theatre, shortFLIX launched in May 2017 with the first five short films exploring subjects including black gay dancehall culture in London, homophobia in an Afro-Caribbean hair salon in Sheffield and a suicidal young man in Bath. In an interview with Game of Thrones actress, Ellie Kendrick, Norbury explains that the organisation was set up "to combat the challenge that whilst talent might be everywhere, opportunity is not" adding that shortFLIX enables "talented new filmmakers from diverse backgrounds to tell their story about their community and identity". The films were produced by Manchester-based production company Delaval Film.

In 2020, Carrie Battram, Johnny Massahi, Danny Seymour, John Akinde, and Isabella Culver were announced as the next recipients of the scheme which also received a boost in funding from ScreenSkills, a London-based non-profit specialising in the promotion of new talent.

shortFLIX films with release dates
Release date	Title	Director(s)	Synopsis	Notes
31 March 2018	Losing It	Ben Robins	The story of the worst drunken hook-up in the history of human sexual encounters. A twenty-something virgin finds his evening taking a turn for the weird, when his new partner shows off a rather unusual fetish.	
31 March 2018	Nosebleed	Luna Carmoon	Nosebleed follows a pivotal week for long-time best friends Lilah and Coby, whose friendship is morphing into something far more venomous and toxic.	
31 March 2018	Ladies Day	Abena Taylor-Smith	A young Black lesbian spends the day in an Afro-Caribbean hair salon. It's full of fun, sheen spray, gossip and laughter, but how will she deal with the casual homophobia?	
31 March 2018	Batty Boy	Dior Clarke and Blain Ho Shing	An uncompromising take on black gay culture, Batty Boy is told in four chapters set against homophobia and dancehall music.	
31 March 2018	Together, they smoke	Henry Gale	A story of a depressed young man. Following a suicide attempt, he must contend with the dysfunctions of his family, a cardboard coffin, and his own anxiety in order to say goodbye to his terminally ill mother.	
24 April 2023	High Tide	Johnny Massahi	After ransacking an ancient island monastery, two siblings, now trapped in their sinking campervan, are torn apart by history, hallucination, and a sacred stone.	
25 April 2023	If I Die Today	John Akinde	David must decide if he wants to follow his friends into a life of crime, or forge a new path for himself.	
26 April 2023	Left Behind	Carrie Battram	Brothers, Samir and Harish must come to terms with the passing of their mother.	
27 April 2023	Offended	Danny Seymour	A middle-aged man embarks on his first date since the death of his wife. Set in the near future where people carry large red buzzers to press whenever they are offended.	

== See also ==
- Arts Council England
- Creative Scotland
- Creative Wales
