= John Sorrell =

John Sorrell may refer to:

- Sir John Sorrell (designer) (born 1945), British designer
- John Sorrell (ice hockey) (1906–1984), Canadian ice hockey left winger
