= Starter for 6 =

Enterprise programme in Scotland

An element of the economy of Scotland, Starter for 6 is an enterprise programme, designed to support creative entrepreneurs in Scotland.

The programme is funded through Creative Scotland’s Innovation Fund (via the Scottish Government).

The aim of the Starter for 6 programme is to transform creative ideas into successful businesses. By doing this, the programme aims to raise the profile of creative entrepreneurs in Scotland and to contribute towards the Scottish economy.
