= Y Deis =

Welsh-language game show

- Genre: Game show
- Created by: Gavin Cox
- Presented by: James Williams
- Theme music composer: Paul Farrer
- Country of origin: United Kingdom
- Original language: Welsh
- No. of series: 1
- No. of episodes: 20

Production
- Production locations: Enfys Studios, Cardiff, Wales
- Running time: 30 minutes (regular); 45 minutes (specials)
- Production company: Slam Media

Original release
- Network: S4C
- Release: 26 November 2025 – present

Y Deis (The Dice) is a Welsh-language game show that first aired on S4C on 26 November 2025. The series is hosted by BBC Radio Wales presenter James Williams and filmed at Enfys studios in Cardiff, also the home since 2014 of Only Connect. The centrepiece of the series are the titular dice - one red, one white, which are contained in a mechanised spinner cage in the centre of the studio and utilised in the gameplay of each of three competitive rounds. Three teams compete for a jackpot prize of up to £4800 across three gameplay rounds. The series was devised by Gavin Cox, who drew inspiration from his late father's career designing pub fruit machine games, and is produced by Slam Media with support from the Government's Creative Wales agency. The show's theme music was composed by Paul Farrer.

Regular editions run to 30 minutes in length (including one commercial break) with celebrity specials running for 45 minutes (including two breaks); the gameplay is basically identical in both versions. The show is broadcast in the Welsh language, and is available with optional English-language subtitles UK-wide on BBC iPlayer.

== Format ==
The show is contested by three pairs of contestants, who are whittled down by two quiz rounds to a single pair, who contest the jackpot final. The rounds play as follows:

=== Round 1 ===
Each of the three teams is given an 18-step ladder up the front of their podium to light: the host asks general knowledge questions with no alternate answer options on-the-buzzer. The dice are rolled before each question is asked to generate the points value (between 2 and 12) of that question, being the sum total of pips displayed when the dice settle. The first two teams to light all 18 steps on their ladder advance to the next round. In regular episodes, a team which is eliminated in the first round (of their first appearance) is invited to return on a future programme to play again; in celebrity editions the consolation prize of Y Deis fuzzy dice is offered to the losing team.

=== Round 2 ===
In the 'grid' round, each team is spotted a starting 'bank' of £120. The teams are then presented with a 6x6 grid of 36 squares, each corresponding to a possible configuration of a dice roll (with values on the red die up one axis and the white die up the other) with each square having a cash value between £40 and £200 (higher-value figures attached to totals which are harder to attain, with the £200 squares at the 'double 6' and 'double 1' positions.) Each team have two chances to play the grid, with the first team to qualify from the opening round given the choice of playing first or second. The dice are rolled to determine which square of the grid is in play; Williams will then ask a multiple choice question with four possible answer options. Selecting the correct answer will place that square's value into 'the Wallet', a holding tally of monies accrued by the team in that round. After a correct answer, the team can opt to move the money currently in the Wallet into their team bank and end their turn, or spin again in the hope of landing on another cash square. Giving an incorrect answer wipes all accrued money from the Wallet (leaving the team bank unchanged) and ends the turn. Three randomly-placed squares on the grid are 'bonus spaces', coloured in gold; when landing on one of these the team in control have the option of answering a question for the stated value, or stealing half the current team bank of the opposing team; doing the latter ends the current team's turn. Once a grid square is landed on and played, either correctly or incorrectly, it is blacked out; landing on a black square (i.e. a dice combination which has already been spun in during the round) wipes out the Wallet and ends the controlling team's current turn. The team with the highest bank total after each team has taken two turns on the grid proceeds to the final, and is guaranteed to take home at least their team bank amount. The losing team's bank is wiped (in regular editions, or donated to the losing team's charity in celebrity specials), and they leave the game with a set of Y Deis fuzzy dice.

=== Final ===
The two members of the winning team play to win the show's jackpot prize of up to £4800. The dice are rolled twice to determine the jackpot amount, with each member of the team now having the power to stop the dice machine rolling by hitting their buzzer; for each roll, the sum total of pips displayed is multiplied by £100 and added to the jackpot total, and if a double is rolled then the total value is doubled (so if for instance a double 4 is rolled, £1600 - double £800 - is awarded). The combined total across both players' rolls forms the final jackpot sum. In order to win the jackpot, the two players are alternately asked questions each with two answer options. A correct answer moves the player one step along a six-step track; an incorrect answer (if they have any steps lit) moves the player back one space. The jackpot is awarded once both players have simultaneously attained the sixth and final step; if one player reaches the top step before the other, questions continue to alternate and the player already on the sixth step has to continue answering correctly to retain their position. The game has a three-minute time limit; if the time expires and the contestants have not both reached the top step, the jackpot is lost and the team leave with their bank amount as carried forward from round 2. If time expires when the players are one step away from the jackpot (i.e. the player is on the fifth step, and the other on the sixth, and so the current question would win or lose the prize) Williams will complete the question, with the team winning or losing dependent on the contestant's answer to that final question.

== Transmissions ==
Series	Start date	End date	Episodes
1	26 November 2025	25 March 2026	20
2	14 October 2026	TBD	TBD

== Other versions ==
Irish-language broadcaster TG4 has acquired the format of Y Deis and aired a 10-episode Irish language version, under the title An Deis, in spring 2026; the TG4 version was recorded at Enfys in Cardiff.
