= Josephine Harris =

British glass engraver and painter (1931–2020)

- Harris in her studio in south-west London
- Born: 16 February 1931
- Died: 28 September 2020 (aged 89)
- Education: Plymouth College of Art
- Occupation: Artist

Josephine Margaret Harris (16 February 1931 – 28 September 2020) was a British glass engraver and painter.

== Early life ==
Harris was born on 16 February 1931. Her father (Major Percy Harris) was a British Army officer and the family moved frequently. She was educated mainly by governesses, but she also attended the York School of Art while they lived in the city. After the end of the Second World War, the family settled in Saltash, Cornwall, and she attended Moorfield School for Girls, a private school in Plymouth, from 1946 to 1948.

== Artistic career ==
In 1948, she enrolled at the Plymouth College of Art, where she learnt a careful observation of detail and skilful drawing under William Mann. She then worked at the Plymouth City Art Gallery, where she was involved in educating children about its collections and loaning pictures to local schools. In 1958, she moved to London where she unsuccessfully applied to the Royal College of Art. Instead, she gained employment as secretary and personal assistant to the Keeper of the Schools at the Royal Academy of Arts; first Sir Henry Rushbury and then his successor Peter Greenham. She continued painting, becoming a member of the Royal Watercolour Society in 1967 and exhibiting her work with the Royal Academy.

In 1969, Harris attended a glass decorating class by Peter Dreiser at Morley College. She left her job at the Royal Academy to set up a studio in Barnes, London, specialising in glass engraving. She worked with a diamond drill on vessels and larger architectural pieces, mostly to commission. These included memorial doors at St Mary's Church, Barnes, screen panels commemorating the Punjab Frontier Force in St Luke's Church, Chelsea, and a bowl celebrating the 10th anniversary of the Garden Museum. She was a founding member of the Guild of Glass Engravers in 1975, and became a "brother" of the Art Workers' Guild in 1981. She was also a member of the New English Art Club. She was elected Master of the Art Workers' Guild for 1997.

== Personal life ==
Harris never married nor had any children. She had an accident at home in 1986, and spent a long period in a convalescent home in Hartley, Plymouth. In 1996, she had a brain cyst removed.

Harris died on 28 September 2020, aged 89, having become frail in later life.
