= Oliver Jeffers =

Australian writer and illustrator

Oliver Jeffers MBE
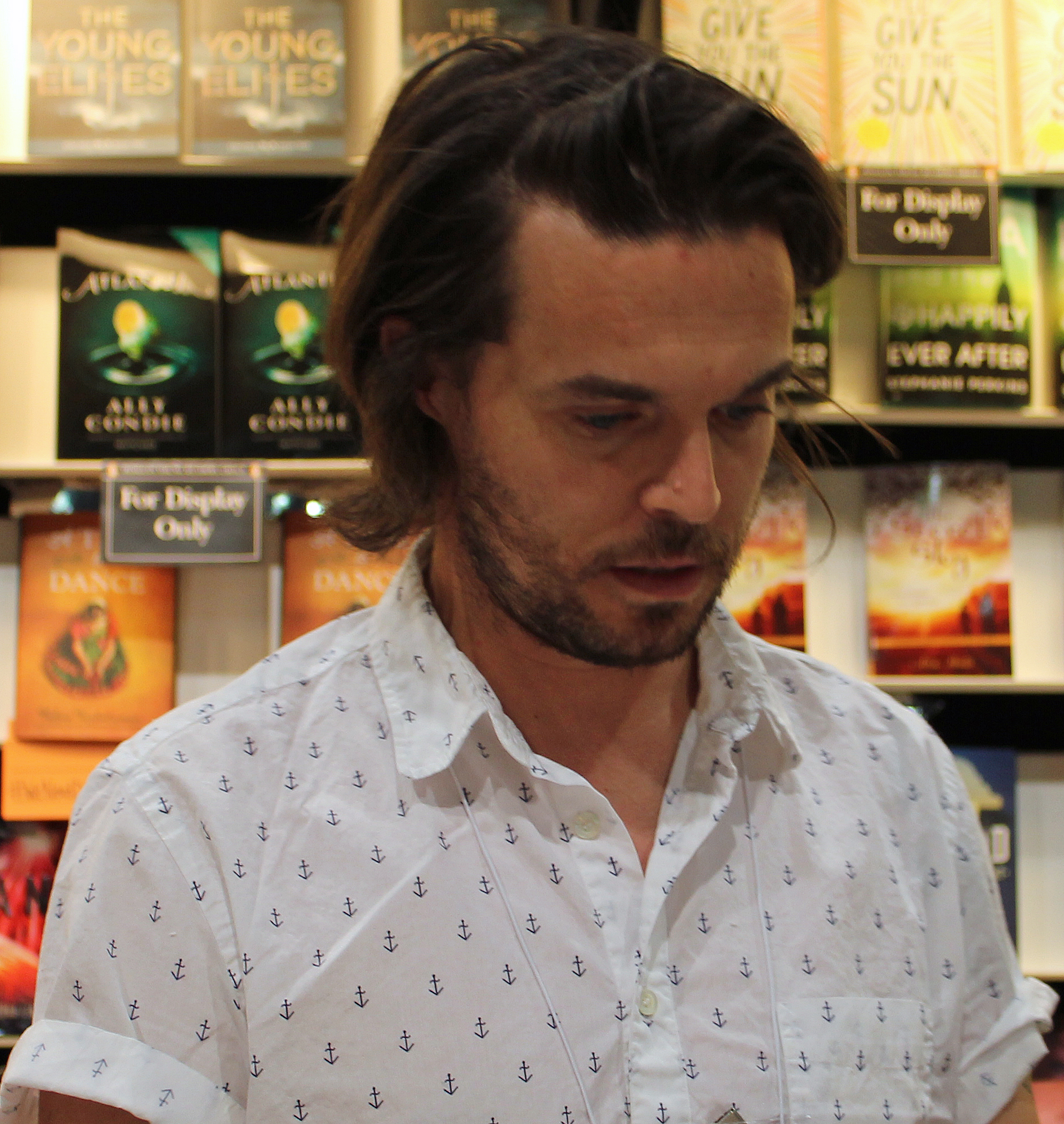
- Oliver Jeffers in 2014
- Born: Oliver Brendan Jeffers; October 5, 1977 (age 48); Port Hedland, Western Australia
- Education: University of Ulster
- Website: oliverjeffers.com

Oliver Brendan Jeffers MBE (born October 5, 1977) is an Australian-born Northern Irish artist, illustrator and writer. He went to the integrated secondary school Hazelwood College, then graduated from the University of Ulster in 2001. He relocated back to Northern Ireland in the early 2020s after a spell living and working in Brooklyn.

== Life and work ==
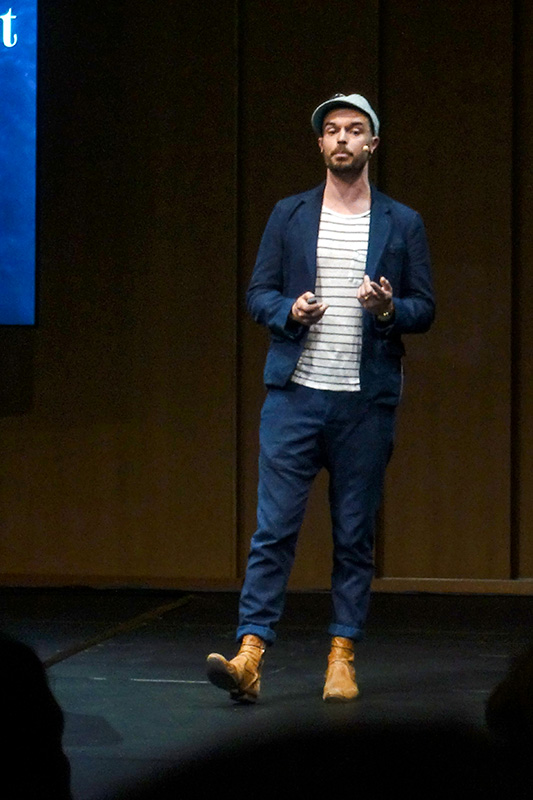
Oliver Jeffers at Typo Berlin 2017

From figurative painting and installation, to illustration and picture-book making, his work has been exhibited in New York, The Brooklyn Museum, Berlin, Dublin, London, Sydney, Washington, D.C., and Belfast.

He is widely known for his picture books for children, published by HarperCollins UK and Penguin US. How to Catch a Star debuted in 2004 to critical acclaim, and Lost and Found (2005) won the Nestlé Smarties Book Prize Gold Medal 2006, the Blue Peter Book Award 2006 and was shortlisted for the Kate Greenaway Medal the same year. The Incredible Book Eating Boy (2007) won the Irish Book Awards Children's Book of the Year, and his fourth Book The Way Back Home was released in September 2007 and The Great Paper Caper was released in September 2008. Stuck & This Moose Belongs to Me were both on The New York Times Best Seller list. Jeffers' books have been translated into German, Spanish and French among other languages.

The Day the Crayons Quit achieved No. 1 on The New York Times Best Seller list.

Jeffers' style of illustration uses mixed media and is recognised for its subtle narrative and use of space in composition. As a freelance illustrator he has worked for clients such as Orange UK, Lavazza, Sony PSP, RCA Records, Starbucks, United Airlines, Newsweek, Wired, The Irish Times, The Guardian, Creative Review, New York Times, Kinder and The Telegraph.

Jeffers artwork consists of figurative painting executed on either canvas or three-dimensional objects, both found and made. His solo show Additional Information, (Belfast December 2006) studied the balance between form and content by drawing parallels between the arts and sciences, in which figurative oil paintings were over laid with mathematical equations.

Oliver Jeffers is represented by Praise Shadows Art Gallery in Boston, Massachusetts, where he has been featured in two solo exhibitions, “The Night in Bloom” (2022) and “Dipped Paintings” (2025). Other solo exhibitions include “Nothing to See Here” (2013) and “Measuring Land and Sea” (2015) at Lazinc Gallery in London and “Life at Sea” (2025) at the Brooklyn Museum. In his artistic practice, he is interested in curiosity, perspective, the power of storytelling, and humor.

As a co-founder of the art collective OAR, along with Rory Jeffers, Mac Premo and Duke Riley, their exhibitions include 9 Days in Belfast, book and the award-winning BUILDING.

In 2007, Jeffers was the official World Book Day Illustrator.

Lost and Found became Jeffers' first book to be made into animation by London-based Studio AKA, premiering on Christmas Eve 2008 on Channel 4. In Australia it aired on Christmas Eve 2009 on ABC1 and Christmas Day 2009 on ABC3. Lost and Found the animation has won more than 40 international awards, including a BAFTA for Best animation in 2009.

In 2008, Jeffers featured in The Times list of "The Best New Picture Book Illustrators".

In 2010, The Heart in the Bottle was released as an iPad app, by HarperCollins.

In 2012, Jeffers provided illustrations for the UK Kinder TV ad campaign.

In 2013, Jeffers illustrated the vinyl cover (a drawing of Nelson Mandela) for the U2 song "Ordinary Love". Jeffers also co-directed (with Mac Premo) the video for the U2 song "Ordinary Love". Two years later, Jeffers contributed video content to the band's Innocence + Experience Tour, creating the chalk drawings and collages for the "innocence" act of the show.

In 2017, Jeffers wrote and illustrated Here We Are: Notes for Living on Planet Earth, a children's book which topped the New York Times Bestseller list in its debut and won Time Magazine's 2017 Best Book of the Year award in the Young Adult and Children's Books category.

In 2020, Jeffers delivered a TED Talk, 'Ode to Living on Earth', which was released on Earth Day. and Jeffers Illustration book Here We Are: Notes for Living on Planet Earth is adapted to a short film by Apple TV+.

Jeffers was appointed Member of the Order of the British Empire (MBE) in the 2022 New Year Honours for services to the arts.

From 15 April – 7 August 2022, the High Museum of Art exhibited a retrospective of his work titled Oliver Jeffers: 15 Years of Picturing Books.

== List of works ==
=== As writer and illustrator ===
- How to Catch a Star (Philomel, Jun 2004)
- Lost and Found (Philomel, Dec 2005)
- The Incredible Book Eating Boy (Philomel, 2006)
- The Way Back Home (Philomel, 2007)
- The Great Paper Caper (Philomel, 2008)
- The Heart and the Bottle (Philomel, Mar 2010)
- Up and Down (Philomel, Dec 2010)
- Stuck (Philomel, Nov 2011)
- This Moose Belongs to Me (Philomel, Nov 2012)
- The Hueys series (Philomel)
  - The New Jumper / The New Sweater (May 2012)
  - It Wasn't Me (Jan 2014)
  - None the Number (Jul 2014)
  - What's the Opposite? (Jan 2016)
- Once Upon an Alphabet: Short Stories for All the Letters (Philomel, Oct 2014)
- A Child of Books, with Sam Winston (Walker Books, 2016)
- Here We Are: Notes for Living on Planet Earth (Philomel, Nov 2017)
- The Fate of Fausto (Philomel, 2019)
- What We'll Build: Plans For Our Together Future (Philomel, 2020)
- There's a Ghost in This House (Philomel, 2021)
- Meanwhile Back on Earth (Philomel, 2022)
- Begin Again (Philomel, 2023)
- The Dictionary Story, with Sam Winston (Walker Books, 2024)
- Where to Hide a Star (Philomel, 2024)
- I'm Very Busy (Philomel, Oct 2025)

=== As illustrator only ===
- Noah Barleywater Runs Away, by John Boyne (2010)
- The Boy Who Swam With Piranhas, by David Almond (2012)
- The Terrible Thing That Happened to Barnaby Brocket, by John Boyne (Knopf, Jan 2013)
- The Day the Crayons Quit, by Drew Daywalt (Philomel, Jun 2013)
- Stay Where You Are And Then Leave, by John Boyne (2014)
- The Day the Crayons Came Home, by Drew Daywalt (Philomel, Aug 2015)
- Imaginary Fred, by Eoin Colfer (HarperCollins, Sep 2015)
- The Crayons' Book of Colors, by Drew Daywalt (2013)
- The Crayon's Christmas, by Drew Daywalt (HarperCollins 2019)
- The Day the Crayons Made Friends, by Drew Daywalt (Philomel, Jun 2025)

=== As cover artist only ===
- The Weight of Water, by Sarah Crossan (2011)
- Five Go to Smugglers Top, by Enid Blyton, 70th Anniversary limited edition (2013)
- What You Need To Be Warm, by Neil Gaiman (2023)

=== Other ===
- Neither Here Nor There – a monograph of paintings by Oliver Jeffers, published by Gestalten (2012)

== Awards ==
- 2005 Merit – CBI Bisto Book of the Year Awards How To Catch A Star
- 2005 Gold Award – Nestlé Smarties Book Prize (5 years and under category) Lost and Found
- 2006 Winner – Blue Peter Book Award Lost and Found
- 2006 Winner – Channel 4 Richard & Judy Award The Incredible Book Eating Boy
- 2006 Merit – CBI Bisto Book of the Year Awards Lost and Found
- 2007 Winner – Irish Book Awards The Incredible Book Eating Boy
- 2007 Merit – CBI Bisto Book of the Year Awards The Incredible Book Eating Boy
- 2008 Merit – CBI Bisto Book of the Year Awards The Way Back Home
- 2009 Merit – CBI Bisto Book of the Year Awards The Great Paper Caper
- 2009 Winner – British Academy Children's Awards Lost and Found Best Illustrated Film with Studio AKA
- 2010 Winner – New York Emmy Awards Best Commercial, Artwalk 09
- 2010 Winner – New York Emmy Awards Best Graphics, Artwalk 09
- 2010 Winner – British Book Design and Production Awards The Heart and the Bottle
- 2011 Winner – V&A 2011 Book Illustration Award The Heart and the Bottle
- 2012 Winner – CBI Book of the Year Awards Honour Award for Illustration, Stuck
- 2012 Winner – Irish Book Awards Junior Children's Book of the Year – This Moose Belongs to Me
- 2012 Winner – The New York Times Book Review One of the year's Best Illustrated Children's Books for The Hueys in The New Sweater
- 2013 Winner – Orbil Prize Best Illustrated Book, Stuck
- 2013 Winner – CBI Book of the Year Awards Honour Award for Illustration, This Moose Belongs To Me
- 2014 Winner – ALA Notable Book 2014 ALA Notable Book, The Day The Crayons Quit (illustrator)
- 2014 Winner – CBI Book of the Year Awards 2014 Children's Choice Award, The Day The Crayons Quit (illustrator)
- 2014 Winner – Children's Book Council 2014 Children's Choice Book Awards (Kindergarten to Second Grade Book of the Year) The Day The Crayons Quit (illustrator)
- 2014 Winner – The Hay Festival of Literature and the Arts 2014 Inaugural Hay Medal for an Outstanding Body of Work
- 2015 Winner – Texas Bluebonnet Award The Day The Crayons Quit (illustrator)
- 2015 Winner – CBI Book of the Year Awards 2015 Book of the Year Award, Once Upon An Alphabet
- 2015 Winner – CBI Book of the Year Awards 2015 Children's Choice Award, Once Upon An Alphabet
- 2017 Winner – Bologna Children's Book Fair 2017 Fiction, A Child of Books
- 2017 Winner – Prix des libraires du Québec 2017 international youth, for the illustration of The boy who swam with piranhas
- 2020 Winner – Prix des libraires du Québec 2020 international youth, We are here

=== Runners-up ===
- 2004 Shortlist – Booktrust Early Years Award (Best New Illustrator) How To Catch A Star
- 2005 Shortlist – Kate Greenaway Medal Lost and Found
- 2006 Shortlist – Booktrust Early Years Award (Pre-School Award)
- 2007 Longlist – Big Picture Best New Illustrator (Booktrust)
- 2007 Shortlist – Redhouse Award The Incredible Book Eating Boy
- 2007 Bronze Award – Norfolk Libraries Children's Book award The Incredible Book Eating Boy
- 2007 Shortlist – Independent Bookseller's Book of the Year The Incredible Book Eating Boy
- 2007 Shortlist – British Book Awards Children's Book of the Year The Incredible Book Eating Boy
- 2008 Shortlist – Irish Book Awards The Way Back Home
- 2009 Shortlist – Kate Greenaway Medal The Way Back Home
- 2009 Shortlist – Roald Dahl Funny Prize (6 years and under category) The Great Paper Caper
- 2009 Shortlist – Somerset Fiction Award The Way Back Home
- 2009 Shortlist – Irish Book Awards The Great Paper Caper
- 2010 Shortlist – Kate Greenaway Medal The Great Paper Caper
- 2011 Shortlist – CBI Book of the Year Awards The Heart and the Bottle
- 2011 Shortlist – CBI Book of the Year Awards Up & Down
- 2011 Shortlist – Kate Greenaway Medal The Heart and the Bottle
- 2012 Shortlist – Roald Dahl Funny Prize (6 years and under category) Stuck
- 2013 Finalist – Kitschies Inky Tentacle for cover art of The Terrible Thing That Happened to Barnaby Brocket by John Boyne
- 2013 Shortlist – Virginia Readers' Choice Master List, Primary Selection, Stuck
