= The Fate of Fausto =

2019 children's picture book

- First edition cover
- Author: Oliver Jeffers
- Illustrator: Oliver Jeffers
- Language: English
- Genre: Children's fiction
- Publisher: HarperCollins
- Publication date: 17 September 2019
- Publication place: Ireland
- Media type: Print (hardback)
- Pages: 96
- ISBN: 9780593115015
- OCLC: 1121050854

The Fate of Fausto: A Painted Fable is a 2019 children's picture book written and illustrated by Oliver Jeffers. Inspired by the German legend of Faust, the book follows the arrogant titular character Fausto, who wants to own every natural worldly possession. It addresses themes of greed, colonialism, power, and environmentalism.

The pages were illustrated using traditional lithographic printmaking techniques, making use of coloured-pencil style figures and saturated shades over expanses of white spaces. Reviewers praised the book for its sparse narrative, illustrations and appeal to the audience. The book featured on the year-end lists by publications such as The Guardian and Time.

== Plot summary ==
The Fate of Fausto tells the story of a balding, moustached man named Fausto, who has a nose-in air posture and wears a three-piece suit. Demanding and selfish, Fausto believes that he owns every natural possession in the world that he sees around himself. Pointing to the sheep, the flower, a tree, and a lake, he declares "You are mine". He then approaches a mountain where he stamps his foot and intimidates it quickly. However, Fausto's greed has no end. Catching sight of the sea, the insatiable Fausto sets out on a boat in an attempt to assert ownership of it, only to find that excessive greed leads to one's own downfall.

== Development ==
Author and illustrator Oliver Jeffers had finished writing the book five years before it was published. Following the birth of his son at the time, he felt that a story about positivity and inclusiveness was more relevant. He decided to hold off publishing it and released the book Here We Are (2017) instead, which expressed the joys of humanity. Meanwhile, The Fate of Fausto was inspired by German legend of Faust, where the protagonist makes a bargain with the devil, trading his soul in exchange for unlimited knowledge and worldly pleasures. Unlike the uplifting tone of Here We Are, The Fate of Fausto is darker, portraying a self-centred character who cares little about his surroundings.

Jeffers spoke about how the book was conceived in an interview with The Irish Times:

I was on the north coast of Antrim and pulled over and to watch a storm coming in, and some absent thoughts started to drift off in different directions. I ended up taking a nap and woke up with the story pretty much on the tip of my tongue.

According to the author, all imaginary objects that have been used in the book including the sheep, the flower, the sea were "literally around [him] there". Themes explored in the book include totalitarian greed, colonialism, power, and man's relationship with nature.

The book was published on 17 September 2019 by HarperCollins.

== Illustrations ==
As opposed to Jeffers's previous works, The Fate of Fausto makes use of traditional lithographic printmaking techniques. Inspired by storybooks from the 1920s and 30s, Jeffers wanted to create a book that lived up to the classic book-making techniques. He enlisted typographer David Pearson to typeset the book by hand. According to Pearson, Chambord Maigre, a 1945 type, was chosen for the book to offer "a simple, elemental appearance" and to reflect its themes of greed and power. The production process took place at the art studio Idem in Paris over the course of two to three weeks.

Jeffers used rich coloured-pencil style art to portray his "casual" figures. Created with a restricted palette, the pages are illustrated with saturated shades of neon pink, acid yellow, and Prussian blue over expanses of white spaces. The book features sparse prose and more illustrations, unlike Jeffers's other books. Leonard S. Marcus of The New York Times interpreted the predominance of blank spaces as "a strategy that symbolically isolates Fausto within his world and makes visible the emptiness of his relationship to it". The usage of monochromatic blue and brown strokes have been associated with the joyless and worn out state of the Earth.

== Reception ==
Critics complimented the book's sparse narrative, minimalistic illustrations, and its appeal to the readers. The Guardian and Time considered The Fate of Fausto to be among the best children's books of 2019, with the latter singling out the "interplay of images and words" that resulted in a "contemplative reading experience for readers of all ages", and the former calling it as "an essential buy for picture book lovers aged five to 85". Imogen Carter of The Guardian described the book as "a fantastically fresh departure" and commented that "it's a tale full of suggestion with expanses of white page wittily used as pregnant pauses and punctuation." She lauded the traditional artwork and regarded it as "the most beautiful [picture book] of the year". S. Marcus identified that the book's illustrations showcased Jeffers's signature "nonchalant finesse" and his preference for "richly saturated colours". He praised Jeffers for offering "swift justice in a few concluding words that make for an ending that satisfies for being both fair-minded and irrevocable". In a journal article published in The Bulletin of the Center for Children's Books, Deborah Stevenson said that the book's "folkloric structure and style" made it enjoyable to read and found the plot both "humorous and gratifying". She dubbed it "a brief Kurt Vonnegut story about Joseph Heller". Writing for the School Library Journal, Chance Lee Joyner regarded the book as a "minimalistic masterpiece" and "a must-read for all ages".

Some critics have also commented on the themes explored in the book. A review in Publishers Weekly of The Fate of Fausto described it as "boldly conceived and gracefully executed" and that "Jeffers's dark fable imagines what happens when desire leads to selfishness and self-destruction, and shows the merits of calm refusal in the face of dangerous individuals." Kirkus Reviews called the book "a cautionary fable on the banality of belligerence" that suggests that "tantrums bring but temporary, superficial rewards".
