= Melanie Eusebe =

British entrepreneur and author (born 1977)

Melanie Eusebe MBE
- Born: Melanie Veronique Eusebe; 12 March 1977 (age 49); St Austell, England
- Education: University of Toronto; Birkbeck, University of London
- Occupations: Entrepreneur and author
- Known for: Founder of the Black British Business Awards
- Website: www.melanieeusebe.com

Melanie Veronique Eusebe MBE (born 12 March 1977) is a British entrepreneur and author, known for co-founding the Black British Business Awards in 2014. She has written for publications such as The Huffington Post and Management Today. She serves on the board of the Creative Industries Federation and teaches as a professor at the Hult International Business School in London.

== Early life and education ==
Eusebe was born in England and grew up in Canada with Trinidadian-Dominican heritage. Her mother, a psychiatric nurse "worked two jobs". Eusebe has said: "I was raised with black and white friends. I went to a predominantly white school.... Coming to London changed my black experience. In terms of my Caribbean-ness, it is just me. It is part of me, not all of me." After graduating from the University of Toronto, she gained a master's degree in Philosophy (Ethics) from Birkbeck College at the University of London.

== Career ==
Eusebe started her career as a management consultant/strategist for more than 17 years with such global brands as IBM and Ernst & Young. She subsequently started her own business services consultancy, The Fresh Ideas Company. She is also an adjunct professor at Hult International Business School, with a focus on Leadership and Management Skills.

=== The Black British Business Awards ===
In keeping with her concern to uncover role models and inspire a new generation of leaders, Eusebe together with international corporate finance lawyer Sophie Chandauka co-founded in 2014 The Black British Business Awards (BBBAs), whose partners include Everywoman, The Telegraph, Evening Standard and others.

=== Broadcasting and other media work ===
Eusebe works with various schools as a mentor and is a regular speaker, lecturer and broadcaster for BBC television and radio programmes such as BBC News at Six, What The Papers Say and Radio 4's Today, as well as hosting a show at Colourful Radio. She has written for such outlets as Huffington Post and Management Today.

Eusebe serves on several boards, among them the Creative Industries Federation.

Eusebe was appointed Member of the Order of the British Empire (MBE) in the 2021 Birthday Honours for services to diversity in business.

In July 2023, she was presented with an honorary degree from the University of Exeter – Doctor of Laws (LLD) – "in recognition of her commitment to championing diversity" throughout her career.
