= Creative Industries Federation =

Arts organisation (2014–2021)

- Formation: 24 November 2014
- Dissolved: 24 November 2021
- Chair: Rick Haythornthwaite
- Chief Executive: Alan Bishop
- Legal status: Non-profit organisation
- Website: www.creativeindustriesfederation.com

The Creative Industries Federation was a national organisation for all the UK's creative industries, cultural education and arts. It advocated for the sector, aiming to ensure that the creative industries were central to political, economic and social decision-making.

Through this advocacy and by leveraging the combined influence of its 1,000+ members across all creative sectors, the Federation further sought to secure the investment required to retain the creative industries' position as the fastest growing sector of the UK economy, as of 2017 worth £91.8bn in Gross Value Added to the UK.

On 24 November 2021, Creative Industries Federation and Creative England combined forces under the newly formed Creative UK.

== History ==
The Federation was the brainchild of Sir John Sorrell, the designer and UK business ambassador, and a team of creative leaders including Sir Peter Bazalgette, Sir Nicholas Serota, Tim Davie of BBC Worldwide, Caroline Rush of the British Fashion Council, Amanda Nevill of the British Film Institute and Darren Henley.

The ambition of the Federation was to give political clout to a sector that had been the fastest growing part of the UK economy over the previous decade, but had never punched above its weight with government.

Operations commenced in March 2014, with early development of the organisation led by the Federation's founding CEO, John Kampfner, and originally funded by more than 200 founder supporters prior to the launch of its membership scheme.

The Creative Industries Federation was officially launched in November 2014 with an event at Central Saint Martins College of Art and Design. This event was attended by more than 500 people from across the creative industries and featured keynote speeches by George Osborne, Martha Lane Fox and UK President of Warner Bros, Josh Berger.

The Federation's membership scheme commenced in January 2015.

During its first year of operation, the Federation forged working relations with the UK government and political parties of all hues, working closely with eight Whitehall departments as well as devolved and city administrations and local authorities. Its work helped secure a better-than-expected settlement for the arts in the November 2015 spending review.

After the Federation's survey prior to the 2016 EU Referendum revealed that 96% of its members backed remaining in the EU, the Federation continued to canvas its members and produce a series of events and reports to help inform UK government policy with regards to Brexit and its potential impact on the creative industries. In February 2017, Creative Industries Federation former CEO, John Kampfner, was invited to present evidence on this issue to a DCMS Select Committee, alongside Sir Peter Bazalgette, then chair of Arts Council England, and Nicola Mendelsohn, Vice President EMEA for Facebook.

In March 2017, the Federation announced the appointment of its new chair, Rick Haythornthwaite, who succeeded founding chair Sir John Sorrell in April 2017.

In July 2018, Alan Bishop, former CEO of the Southbank Centre, succeeded John Kampfner as CEO of the Creative Industries Federation.

== Rebrand to Creative UK ==
On 24 November 2021, Creative Industries Federation and Creative England combined forces under the newly formed Creative UK, having previously worked together since 2019 under the Creative UK Group. The launch coincided with updated branding across the organisation and a new tag line; Here for those who dare to imagine.

Within Creative UK's launch statement on the same day, CEO Caroline Norbury MBE stated "By coalescing the collective capabilities of Creative England and the Creative Industries Federation, and drawing on the insights and experience of our growing membership, we are perfectly positioned to have visible impact and drive real change."

== Membership ==
The Federation was funded through a membership scheme through which it represented more than 1000 organisations drawn from across sectors including advertising and media, animation, architecture, broadcasting, crafts, creative education, creative tech, design, fashion, film, heritage, museums, galleries and libraries, music, performing arts, photography, publishing, video games, visual arts and visual effects.

Members included FTSE 100 companies, multinationals, privately owned businesses, SMEs, charities and non-profit organisations, trade associations, universities and further education colleges, and individual practitioners.

The Federation provided members' benefits including research reports, a calendar of networking events, international trends analysis and discount offers for members.

== Work ==
The Federation represented the interests of the UK creative industries to the UK government, the media and the general public.

Policy and research was at the heart of the Federation's work, with its aim being to secure the best possible conditions for growth and continued success for the UK's creative industries, developing policy priorities through consultation with its members. Successes include securing the inclusion of the creative industries in plans for the UK government's industrial strategy, to include an independent review of the sector by Sir Peter Bazalgette to inform an early sector deal.

Focuses included the impact of Brexit on the creative industries, development of a skilled workforce through creative education in schools, measures to diversify the workforce, improved support for working internationally, access to finance through both public and private funding and the necessary infrastructure such as fast broadband and intellectual property rights protection.

== Publications ==
- Creative Education Agenda May 2015
- How public investment in arts contributes to growth in the creative industries - July 2015
- Creative Diversity - September 2015
- Creative industries - routes to finance November 2015
- The C. Report 2015-2016 - January 2016
- Industrial Strategy for the Creative Industries - September 2016
- Social Mobility and the Skills Gap, Creative Education Agenda - October 2016
- Brexit Report: The impact of leaving the EU on the UK's arts, creative industries and cultural education - and what should be done - October 2016
- The C. Report 2016-2017 - January 2017
- Because the Night: Why what happens after dark matters - February 2017
- Industrial Strategy: A blueprint for growth - April 2017
- Creative Freelancers - July 2017
- Global Talent Report - October 2017

== Board and governance ==
=== Board ===
- Rick Haythornthwaite (Chair)
- Karen Blackett, Chairwoman, MediaCom
- Nigel Carrington, Vice Chancellor, University of the Arts London
- Jamie Coleman, Founder, Codebase
- Melanie Eusebe, Chair and Co-Founder, Black British Business Awards
- Jefferson Hack, Chief Executive and Co-Founder, Dazed Media
- Anna Jones, Co-founder, AllBright Group
- Jude Kelly, Artistic Director, Southbank Centre
- Kwame Kwei-Armah, Artistic Director, Young Vic
- Janet Markwick, Global EVP Commercial Operations and Production, Y&R
- Ben McOwen Wilson, Director EMEA, YouTube
- Tamara Rojo, Artistic Director and Lead Principal dancer, English National Ballet
- Giselle Stewart, Director UK Corporate Affairs, Ubisoft
- Philip Watkins, Partner, Katten Muchin Rosenman LLP (Company Secretary)
- Tom Weldon, Chief Executive, Penguin Random House UK

=== UK Council ===
The UK Council met three times a year to inform the Federation's policy work. Council members were selected from the Federation membership to give representation to all the arts and creative industries across the commercial, public and education sectors as well as broad representation of the country at large.

=== International Council ===
The International Council was launched in July 2016, featuring creative industries leaders from around the world. It identified emergent opportunities for the sector and examples of innovation and best practice from around the world. These findings inform the Federation's biannual international magazine, C.International.
