= Drew Daywalt =

American author and filmmaker (born 1970)

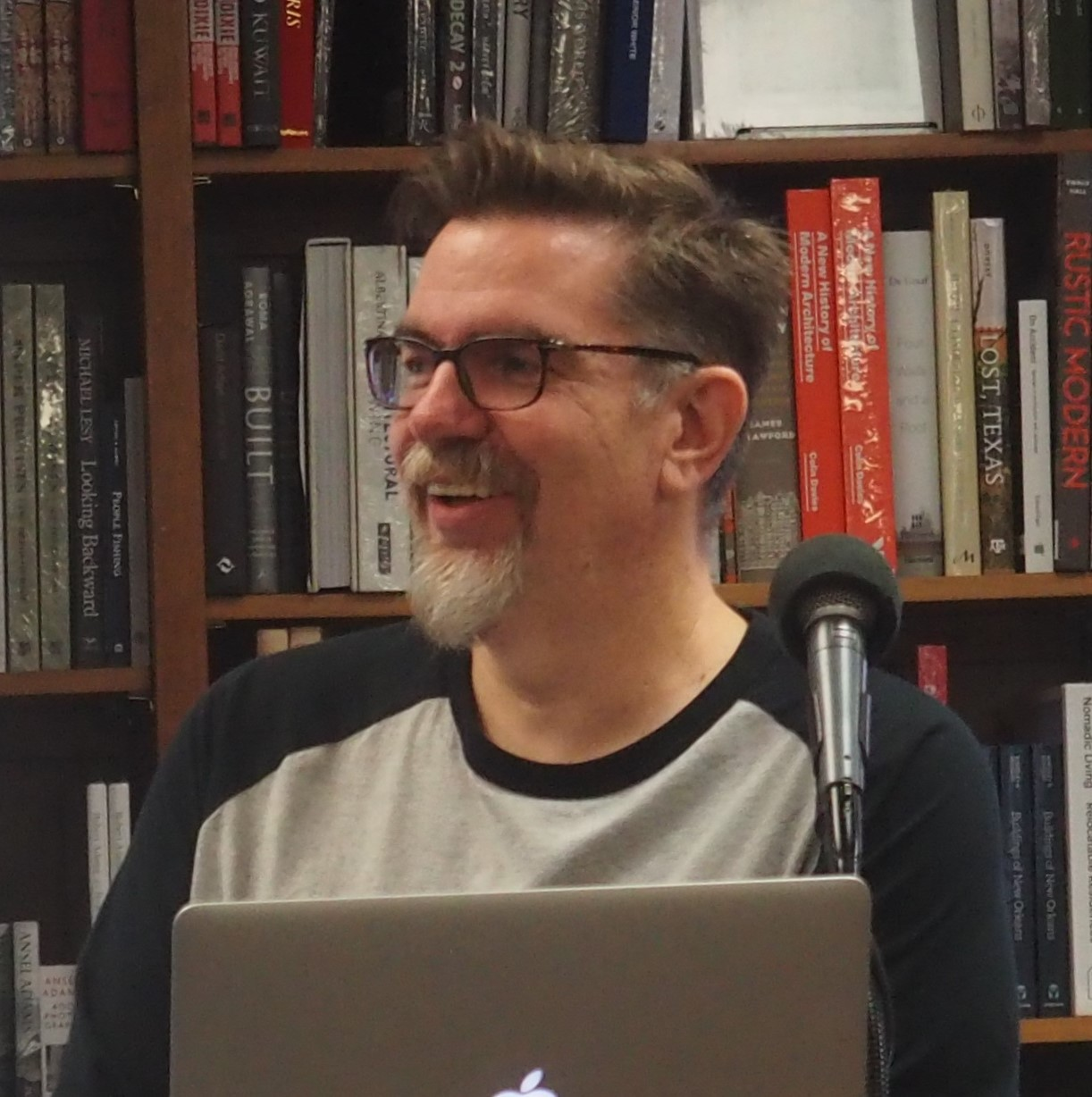
Drew Daywalt at Politics and Prose, Washington, D.C

Drew Daywalt (born January 5, 1970), is an American author and filmmaker. He is best known for writing the best-selling children's picture book The Day the Crayons Quit, and its sequel The Day the Crayons Came Home, both illustrated by Oliver Jeffers. Daywalt is also known for writing scripts for American television and Hollywood studio films, and for creating a number of short horror films for release on the internet.

== Early life ==
Drew Daywalt was born in Hudson, Ohio, on January 5, 1970, the youngest of six children, to Charlene (née Bable) and Charles Daywalt. "I grew up in a house in Hudson, Ohio, that was notoriously haunted. It looked like 'The Munsters.'" The house had a storied reputation in the local area, having supposedly been a stagecoach stop, a brothel, and a respite on the Underground Railroad at various times.

Daywalt's older brothers, however unintentionally, fostered his interest in scary stories. He relates, "My older brothers would always let me stay up way too late on Friday nights, drink Mountain Dew, watch horror movies. I was always getting into their comic books ... Heavy Metal and Creepy and Tales from the Crypt. Also, at the time – this is going back to the mid 70s, almost into the early 80s – they were reading Tolkien and lot of that, so I had that as one side of my experiences. Growing up in a haunted house, watching horror movies with my older brothers and getting into their stash of horror magazines and comic books."

During the same period, Daywalt's mother, Charlene, would often come home from work and read to him from the works of well-known children's authors, like Dr. Seuss, Roald Dahl and Maurice Sendak. "I was constantly being inundated by other worlds", said Daywalt. "A lot of what I do, whether it's either horror or children's lit, comes from that period in my life."

The author/filmmaker said he first realized that books and movies "were actually written and created by other human beings" at the age of 7. "It was 1977. Summer. And my big sister had taken me to see the first Star Wars film. As the credits rolled at the end, and I sat there trying to catch my breath and fully digest what I'd seen, I saw the screenplay credit. I knew then that I wanted to tell stories."

Daywalt's family eventually moved to nearby Stow, Ohio, where he attended Highland Elementary School. After graduating from Stow-Munroe Falls High School in 1988, Daywalt pursued creative writing at Emerson College in Boston.

"My concentrations were in screenwriting and children's literature", Daywalt has stated. "Because at the time, my big plan was: if I really know children's literature and the history of fairy tales, and storytelling for kids in a meaningful and deep way, and I also learn screenwriting, I can go and work with Disney. That was my goal, was to get out [to Los Angeles] and work with Disney and Warner Brothers and write children's animation for TV and for film."

== Career ==
=== Filmmaking ===
Daywalt first achieved fame writing and directing short films with the horror filmmaking YouTube channel Fewdio, co-founded by Daywalt in 2007. In a 2009 interview with Dread Central, Daywalt described the origins of Fewdio, saying, "We were all a little bit burned out on dealing with studio execs around the time the strike hit. I had been a script writer for 17 years, and I'd written for and rewritten everyone in town so I was ready for something different. We had done the Axe Body campaign – 'How Dirty Boys Get Clean' – that pretty much set us up financially so we could get through the strike. That's when we decided to do what we loved as children: make horror films. We really wanted to do something for ourselves. I read everything I could about cameras and saved up a thousand bucks, and we shot our first short, 'Cursed.'" Daywalt made numerous shorts with Fewdio, and his 2009 horror short "Bedfellows" won the Chiller-Eyegore Award for Best Short Film. Drew Grant of Salon described Daywalt's work with the group as "the first really great horror films for the Internet era." The group disbanded in 2010, however, and Daywalt went on to found his own YouTube channel, Daywalt Fear Factory.

In 2012, Daywalt directed his first feature-length film, the made-for-television fantasy horror film Red Clover (released as Leprechaun's Revenge) for SyFy Channel. The film was met with mixed to negative reviews.

=== Writing children's books ===
==== The Day the Crayons Quit ====
Drew Daywalt's first children's picture book, The Day the Crayons Quit, with illustrations by Oliver Jeffers, was published by Philomel Books on June 27, 2013. The book was a critical and commercial success, earning positive responses from critics and selling over one-and-a-half million copies worldwide. The idea for the book originated with a simple box of crayons on Daywalt's desk, and his affinity for writing dialogue.

"I thought, 'Here I am, a grown-up — it was before I had kids — and I have a box of crayons on my desk.' It was still important enough for me in my life to have a box of crayons around. I didn't exactly know what to write about crayons, but I knew that it was something I wanted to approach.

"In Hollywood I had been a script doctor for years, fixing dialogue on movies. As a writer, one of my strengths is voice, so I thought, 'I'm going to give these crayons voices ...' I decided I'd write them as monologues in the form of letters, in an epistolary style — basically all these crayons would chew this kid out because they didn't like the way they were being used. They were like letters of resignation."

Since the book's original publication in 2013, The Day the Crayons Quit has been almost unrivaled in sales within its genre. In 2015, Entertainment Weekly referred to it as the longest running title to ever appear on The New York Times Best Seller list for children's picture books, the book having held the weekly number-one spot on the list for over a year, and a total of 258 weeks on the list as of January 2019.

Critical response to the book has been largely positive. For instance, the starred review in Publishers Weekly stated, "Making a noteworthy debut, Daywalt composes droll missives that express aggravation and aim to persuade", while referring to the crayon characters as "memorable personalities [that] will leave readers glancing apprehensively at their own crayon boxes."

In 2014, Danielle Herzog of The Washington Post joyfully related the experience of reading the book to her own children. "As I read each letter to my 6 and 3-year-old children", she wrote, "they howled with laughter. They loved the argument between the orange and yellow crayon over who gets to be the color of the sun, and they cracked up when the poor white crayon is only used to make pictures of cats and snow ... But the best part came after the book was closed and put away. They rushed to their own crayon boxes, pulled out the same colors we read about, and started to color an array of pictures now gracing our refrigerator door."

The Day The Crayons Quit has won numerous children's book awards. In the year of its publication, 2013, the book won the Goodreads Choice Award for Best Picture Book, was named Amazon's Best Children's Book, and was named to Time magazine's list of the 100 Best Children's Books of All Time. Later, the book won the Texas Bluebonnet Award in 2015, having received 29,931 votes from Texas children. Daywalt and Jeffers received the award in person, on April 16, 2015, at the Texas Bluebonnet Award Luncheon. The book also won the 2015 Nevada Young Readers Award, the 2016 California Young Reader Medal, and the 2016 Young Hoosier Book Award (Picture Book).

In late July 2014, the film rights for The Day the Crayons Quit were purchased by Universal Studios, with Matt Lopez set to script and Madhouse Entertainment set to produce.

==== Other children's books ====
In October 2014, Daywalt announced a sequel to the book titled The Day the Crayons Came Home. It was published by Philomel Books on August 18, 2015, with illustrations once again by Oliver Jeffers. The book garnered critical acclaim and similarly enthusiastic sales, remaining on The New York Times Best Seller list for children's picture books for over 40 weeks.

In 2017, Daywalt wrote another picture book The Legend of Rock Paper Scissors, illustrated by Adam Rex, which won the 2019–2020 Young Hoosier Book Award.

=== Awards ===
Book Title	Award	Year(s)
The Day the Crayons Quit	The New York Times Best Sellers List - Children's Picture Books	2013 - 2025
The Day the Crayons Quit	Barnes & Noble's Best New Kids' Books of 2013	2013
The Day the Crayons Quit	Amazon's Top 20 Editors' Picks: Children's Books - Best Books of 2013	2013
The Day the Crayons Quit	Goodreads.com Choice Awards Best Picture Book of 2013	2013
The Day the Crayons Quit	Newsday New Picture Book for Kids' Summer Reading	2013
The Day the Crayons Quit	School Library Journal Best Books 2013 Picture Books Top 10	2013
The Day the Crayons Quit	Hudson Booksellers 2013 Book of the Year Best Young Readers	2013
The Day the Crayons Quit	The Children's Book Council Children's Choice Book Awards (Kindergarten to Second Grade Book of the Year Finalist)	2014
The Day the Crayons Quit	E. B. White Read Aloud Award Winners - Picture Book	2014
The Day the Crayons Quit	Minnesota State Moorhead Comstock-Gág Read Aloud Book Award	2014
The Day the Crayons Quit	Children's Book Ireland Book of the Year Awards - Children's Choice Award	2014
The Day the Crayons Quit	Maryland Association of School Librarians Black-Eyed Susan Book Award	2014-2015
The Day the Crayons Quit	Time Magazine LIST: The 100 Best Children's Books of All Time	2015
The Day the Crayons Quit	Texas Bluebonnet Award	2015
The Day the Crayons Quit	Grand Canyon Reader Award - Picture Book	2015
The Day the Crayons Quit	Illinois Monarch Award 2015	2015
The Day the Crayons Quit	Mississippi Children's Museum Magnolia Book Award (Grades Pre-K-2)	2015
The Day the Crayons Quit	Kansas Bill Martin Jr. Picture Book Award	2015
The Day the Crayons Quit	Golden Archer Award in the Primary Category (Grades K-2) - Wisconsin Educational Media and Technology Association (WEMTA)	2015
The Day the Crayons Quit	North Carolina Children's Book Award - Picture Book	2015
The Day the Crayons Quit	Michigan Reading Association Great Lakes Great Books Award (Kindergarten & 1st Grade)	2015
The Day the Crayons Quit	Vermont's K-4 Children's-Choice Picture Book Red Clover Book Award	2015
The Day the Crayons Quit	Connecticut 2015 Nutmeg Book Award - Elementary	2015
The Day the Crayons Quit	Minnesota Youth Reading Awards Star of the North Award	2015
The Day the Crayons Quit	Colorado Children's Book Award Winners - Picture Book Winner	2015
The Day the Crayons Quit	Washington Children's Choice Picture Book Award	2015
The Day the Crayons Quit	New Hampshire State Library 2015 Ladybug Picture Book Award	2015
The Day the Crayons Quit	Red House Children's Book Award 2015 - Best Book Overall (England)	2015
The Day the Crayons Quit	Red House Children's Book Award 2015 - Young Readers (England)	2015
The Day the Crayons Quit	2015 West Australian Young Readers’ Book Awards (WAYRBA) - Picture Book	2015
The Day the Crayons Quit	South Carolina Association of School Libraries Picture Book Award	2015-2016
The Day the Crayons Quit	California Young Reader Medal Winner - Primary	2015-2016
The Day the Crayons Quit	Arkansas Diamond Primary Book Award, 2015–2016, Grades K-3	2015-2016
The Day the Crayons Quit	Nebraska Golden Sower Award, 2015-2016 - Primary, Grades K-3	2015-2016
The Day the Crayons Quit	Tennessee Volunteer State Book Awards, 2015-2016 - Primary Division, Grades PreK-2	2015-2016
The Day the Crayons Quit	Indiana Young Hoosier Book Award, 2015–2016, Grades K-3	2015-2016

== Bibliography ==
- —— (2013). The Day the Crayons Quit. Illustrated by Oliver Jeffers. Philomel Books. ISBN 9780399255373.
- —— (2015). The Day the Crayons Came Home. Illustrated by Oliver Jeffers. Philomel Books. ISBN 9780399172755.
- —— (2017). The Legend of Rock Paper Scissors. Illustrated by Adam Rex. HarperCollins/Balzer + Bray. ISBN 9780062438898.
- —— (2017). Star Wars: BB-8 on the Run. Illustrated by Matt Myers. Disney Lucasfilm Press. ISBN 9781484705087.
- —— (2018). Sleepy, the Goodnight Buddy. Illustrated by Scott Campbell. Disney-Hyperion. ISBN 9781484789698.
- —— (2018). The Epic Adventures of Huggie & Stick. Illustrated by David Spencer. Philomel Books. ISBN 9780399172762.
