= Lost and Found (picture book) =

2005 picture book by Oliver Jeffers

- First edition cover
- Author: Oliver Jeffers
- Illustrator: Oliver Jeffers
- Language: English
- Genre: Children's
- Publisher: HarperCollins
- Publication date: 5 September 2005
- Publication place: United Kingdom
- Pages: 32
- ISBN: 978-0-00-715035-9
- OCLC: 62889296
- Dewey Decimal: [E] 22
- LC Class: PZ7.J3643 Los 2005

Lost and Found is a children's picture book by Oliver Jeffers, published in 2005. It won the Nestlé Smarties Book Prize Gold Award and was the Blue Peter Book of the Year.

An animated short film adaptation was made by Studio AKA in 2008. It was directed by Philip Hunt and broadcast on Channel 4.

== Reception ==
Lost and Found has been favorably received. Kirkus Reviews wrote "Readers who (inexplicably) find David Lawrence’s Pickle and Penguin (2004) just too weird may settle in more comfortably with this—slightly—less offbeat friendship tale." and Publishers Weekly called it "beguiling" and described it as a "...gently humorous and heartwarming tale of friendship found, lost and regained" Inis magazine of Children's Books Ireland described it "a very special book which I am sure will become a favourite with 3 to 4-year-olds. It also offers wide scope for discussion in the playschool/infant classroom." while Book Trust wrote " it is a visual delight, and its themes of loneliness and friendship will resonate with young readers."

Common Sense Media found the movie adaption "appropriate for all ages and doesn't contain anything questionable."

== Theatre ==
A stage version of Lost and Found, for children aged 3 and above has been created by Travelling Light and Polka Theatre. It was performed at the historic Jacksons Lane theatre in Highgate, London in April 2011.
