= Nigel Carrington =

British lawyer and academic leader

Sir Nigel Carrington
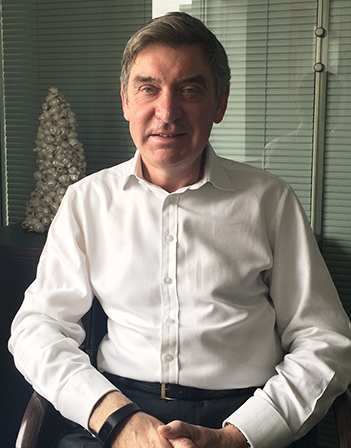
- Nigel Carrington, Vice-Chancellor of University of the Arts London.
- Education: St John's College, Oxford
- Occupations: Lawyer and academic leader
- Known for: Vice-Chancellor of University of the Arts London
- Awards: Honorary Fellow, St John's College
- Website: blogs.arts.ac.uk/vice-chancellor

Sir Nigel Martyn Carrington is a British lawyer and academic leader who served as vice-chancellor of University of the Arts London between 2008 and 2020.

== Education ==
Carrington studied at Brighton College, a boarding independent school for boys (now co-educational) in the city of Brighton and Hove in East Sussex in southern England (1969–1974), before going to St John's College, Oxford, where he graduated with a law degree in 1978.

== Career ==
=== Baker McKenzie ===
He worked as an international lawyer with Baker McKenzie from 1979 to 2000. He was appointed managing partner of the London office at the age of 38, and was also a member of the firm's international executive committee, and chairman of its European and Middle East Regional Council.

=== McLaren Group ===
In 2000, he joined the McLaren Group as managing director, becoming deputy chairman in 2005, when he undertook a graduate diploma in the history of art at the Courtauld Institute and became a non-executive director of companies, charities and organisations in the public sector.

=== University of the Arts London ===
In September 2008 he became vice-chancellor of University of the Arts London.

As vice-chancellor and chief executive, he had overall responsibility for the executive management of the university and chaired the university's executive and academic boards. He stepped down in December 2020.

During his tenure at the university, which has an annual budget in excess of £250 million, he managed a number of strategic projects, including the university's £200m capital development of the Central Saint Martins campus at King's Cross and the £69m Camberwell College of Arts redevelopment project, which officially launched on 5 March 2018.

He has commented publicly on a number of issues affecting higher education and the creative industries. These include the importance of studying in the EU, universities' expansion in the uncapped student numbers environment, tuition fees, student visas, and the impact of Government policy on the design industry. He has also written for the Higher Education Policy Institute arguing that a structural deficit has emerged in higher education across creative subjects because of the expense of teaching art and design subjects.

He has also appeared before the All Party Parliamentary Group (APPG) on Art, Craft & Design in Education.

Carrington was knighted in the 2019 Birthday Honours for services to higher education and the creative industries.

=== Boards and committees ===
Carrington has been chair of The Saturday Club Trust (National Saturday Club) since 2021. He was chairman of the Henry Moore Foundation until 2024. He is a former chair of the board of Advance HE, a director of the Creative Industries Federation, a trustee of The English Concert, a trustee of Cass Sculpture Foundation, chair of trustees at Burgh House & Hampstead Museum from 2017 and a member of the board at Universities UK. Previous positions held include non-executive director of University College London Hospitals NHS Foundation Trust (2005–2008), trustee of Crisis (2005–2011), trustee of Independent Opera (2006–2010), trustee and chairman of Jeans for Genes (2006–2008), a governor of North London Collegiate School, (2007–2015), non-executive director of Hornby plc (2007–2014) and a governor of International Students House (2009-2017).

Academic offices
Preceded by Sir Michael Bichard	Vice-Chancellor of University of the Arts London; 2008–2020	Succeeded by Rt Hon James Purnell
