= Frances Sorrell =

British designer

Frances Sorrell CBE
- Born: Frances Newell; Surrey, England, UK
- Occupations: Chancellor of the University of Westminster; designer, education advocate
- Spouse: Sir John Sorrell

Frances Mary Sorrell, Lady Sorrell, CBE (née Newell) is a British designer and a renowned advocate and campaigner for creative education. She was the Chancellor of the University of Westminster from June 2015 – 2020.

== Career ==
Sorrell co-founded the design business Newell and Sorrell in 1976 with her husband John Sorrell. Newell and Sorrell became one of Europe’s biggest and most successful design and identity consultancies, with clients that included British Airways, the Body Shop and the Royal Mail. The business won numerous awards for creativity and effectiveness, including eleven DBA Design Effectiveness Awards, five Silver D&AD Awards, five Clios, five Gold Awards in New York Festivals and two Art Directors Club of Europe Awards.

In 1997, Newell and Sorrell merged with Interbrand to form Interbrand Newell & Sorrell. Frances and John left Interbrand Newell & Sorrell in 2000.

== The Sorrell Foundation ==
Frances and John Sorrell co-founded the Sorrell Foundation in 1999 with the aim of inspiring creativity in young people and improving lives with good design.

The Sorrell Foundation has worked with more than 100,000 young people across the UK on a range of programmes, including joinedupdesignforschools, the Young Design Programme, myplace and Design out Crime.

In 2009, Frances and John Sorrell set up the National Saturday Club network. Lady Frances Sorrell is co-chair of the Sorrell Foundation.

== The Saturday Club Trust ==
Sorrell is co-founder and trustee of the Saturday Club Trust, a new charity formed in 2016 to take over the development of the Saturday Clubs from the Sorrell Foundation. The Saturday Club network offers young people aged 13–16 the opportunity to study in their local college or university on Saturdays for free. Currently there are around 50 Art&Design Saturday Clubs across the UK, as well as growing numbers in Science&Engineering, Fashion&Business and Writing&Talking.

== Other roles ==
Sorrell was Chancellor of the University of Westminster from 2015 to 2020.

She has had many other roles and appointments including Visiting Professor at University of the Arts London, Trustee of Mencap, and a Director of the Royal Academy of Arts Enterprises Board. Frances has been a judge for many design awards, including D&AD, the BBC and the RIBA. Frances sat on the Advisory Board for the National Museum of Photography, Film and Television [now the National Media Museum] from 1997 to 2003, the City & Guilds Affairs and Awards Committee from 1999 to 2001, the NHS Design Advisory Group from 2001 to 2003 and the British Council Design Advisory Group from 2004 to 2008.

Sorrell co-authored ‘Joinedupdesignforschools’ (Merrell, 2005) with John Sorrell.

== Honours and awards ==
Sorrell is an Honorary Fellow of Falmouth University, Plymouth College of Art, Hereford College of Arts and the RIBA. She holds Honorary Doctorates from the Open University, Coventry University and University for the Creative Arts.

In 2008, Frances and John Sorrell received the D&AD President’s Award for their outstanding contribution to creativity.

Sorrell was appointed Officer of the Order of the British Empire (OBE) in the 2016 Birthday Honours for services to art and design education and Commander of the Order of the British Empire (CBE) in the 2024 New Year Honours for services to design and the creative industries.

== Early life ==
Sorrell was born in Woking, Surrey. She studied at Epsom School of Art [now part of the University for the Creative Arts], and attended free Saturday-morning art classes there from the age of 14. Her experience of Saturday morning art classes inspired her later foundation of the National Art&Design Saturday Club.
