= The Day the Crayons Quit =

2013 children's book

- Front cover illustration
- Author: Drew Daywalt
- Illustrator: Oliver Jeffers
- Language: English
- Genre: children's books picture books
- Publisher: Penguin Round House
- Publication date: June 27, 2013
- Publication place: United States

The Day the Crayons Quit is a 2013 children's picture book written by Drew Daywalt and illustrated by Oliver Jeffers. The book follows a boy named Duncan who discovers that his crayons have written him letters expressing their frustrations and grievances. In the letters, the crayons describe how they have been treated, some feeling overused, others ignored, and some frustrated by being used for the "wrong purposes". The book has been widely praised for its humor, creative structure, and distinct character identities, and has received multiple awards.

A sequel, The Day the Crayons Came Home, was published in 2015.

== Plot summary ==
A boy named Duncan finds a stack of letters one day in class with his name on them. As Duncan reads the letters, each crayon shares a different complaint about its treatment, revealing their differing perspectives and personalities. Some crayons express frustration with being used too frequently, while others feel ignored, and some even feel they are used in ways they do not prefer. The story centers around Duncan reading and responding to the concerns raised by the crayons. In the end, he mixes all of the crayons into one multi-colored one and uses it in a drawing, which his teacher awards him for.

== Author & illustrator ==
Drew Daywalt began his career with a focus on writing for film and television, although he was encouraged to earlier pursue children’s literature while studying at Emerson College. His background as a writer shaped his emphasis on character voice and dialogue which became central to the structure of The Day the Crayons Quit. The book is illustrated by Oliver Jeffers, whose visual style complements the text by conveying the personalities of each crayon. Daywalt’s writing style and Jeffers’ illustrations contribute to the book's tone and accessibility for young readers.

== Inspiration ==
The idea for The Day the Crayons Quit came from inspiration in Drew Daywalt’s office. Daywalt noticed a box of crayons on his desk and began to consider them as potential subjects for the book, imagining what each of them would say about how they had been used. Drawing on his experience writing dialogue, he developed the idea by giving each crayon its own voice. The crayons' different conditions, such as being worn down or unused, helped shape their personalities in the story.

== Reception ==
The book became a critical and commercial success, earning positive responses from critics and selling over one-and-a-half million copies worldwide.

Since its publication in 2013, The Day the Crayons Quit has remained a highly successful title within the picture book market. In 2015, Entertainment Weekly referred to it as the longest running title to ever appear on The New York Times Best Seller list for children's picture books, the book having held the weekly number-one spot on the list for over a year, and a total of 258 weeks on the list as of January 2019.

In 2014, Danielle Herzog of The Washington Post joyfully related the experience of reading the book to her own children. "As I read each letter to my 6 and 3-year-old children", she wrote, "they howled with laughter. They loved the argument between the orange and yellow crayon over who gets to be the color of the sun, and they cracked up when the poor white crayon is only used to make pictures of cats and snow ... But the best part came after the book was closed and put away. They rushed to their own crayon boxes, pulled out the same colors we read about, and started to color an array of pictures now gracing our refrigerator door."

Reviews of the book highlight its humor and character voices through the use of individual letters written from each crayon’s perspective. A Publishers Weekly review described the book as a “noteworthy debut,” noting that the letters express the crayons’ frustrations while aiming to persuade the reader. The review also emphasizes the memorable personalities of the crayons and the way illustrations reinforce their perspectives by showing how each crayon is used.

== Awards ==
The Day the Crayons Quit has won numerous children's book awards. In the year of its publication, 2013, the book won the Goodreads Choice Award for Best Picture Book, was named Amazon's Best Children's Book, and was named to Time magazine's list of the 100 Best Children's Books of All Time. Later, the book won the Texas Bluebonnet Award in 2015, having received 29,931 votes from Texas children. Daywalt and Jeffers received the award in person, on April 16, 2015, at the Texas Bluebonnet Award Luncheon. The book also won the 2015 Nevada Young Readers Award, the 2016 California Young Reader Medal, and the 2016 Young Hoosier Book Award (Picture Book).

== Sequel and film adaptation ==
A sequel, The Day the Crayons Came Home, was published in 2015, continuing the story of Duncan’s crayons. The sequel follows various crayons that had been lost over time, presenting their experiences through a series of postcards that describe their situations and locations. Film rights to The Day the Crayons Quit were acquired by Universal Studios in 2014, with Matt Lopez set to write the script and Madhouse Entertainment to produce. In 2017, the film rights were acquired by Sony Pictures. In 2025, Brian Schacter and Shawn Levy's 21 Laps Entertainment were announced to produce the film for Columbia Pictures.
