= Scottish Documentary Institute =

Film organisation

The Scottish Documentary Institute (SDI) is an organisation based in Edinburgh, Scotland which supports documentary filmmakers. The SDI produces many short films each year as part of their Bridging the Gap training initiative, giving emerging filmmakers the chance to get a foot on the industry ladder. It has previously won financial support from Creative Scotland, and often showcases new work at Edinburgh International Film Festival.
