= Arts University Plymouth =

University in Plymouth, England

Coordinates: 50.373°N 4.137°W

- Former names: Plymouth Drawing School, Plymouth College of Art and Design, Plymouth College of Art (2008–2022)
- Type: Public
- Established: 1856 - Plymouth Drawing School; 2022 - gained university status
- Affiliations: Universities UK
- Students: 1,610 (2024/25)
- Undergraduates: 1,535 (2024/25)
- Postgraduates: 75 (2024/25)
- Location: Plymouth, Devon, United Kingdom
- Website: www.aup.ac.uk

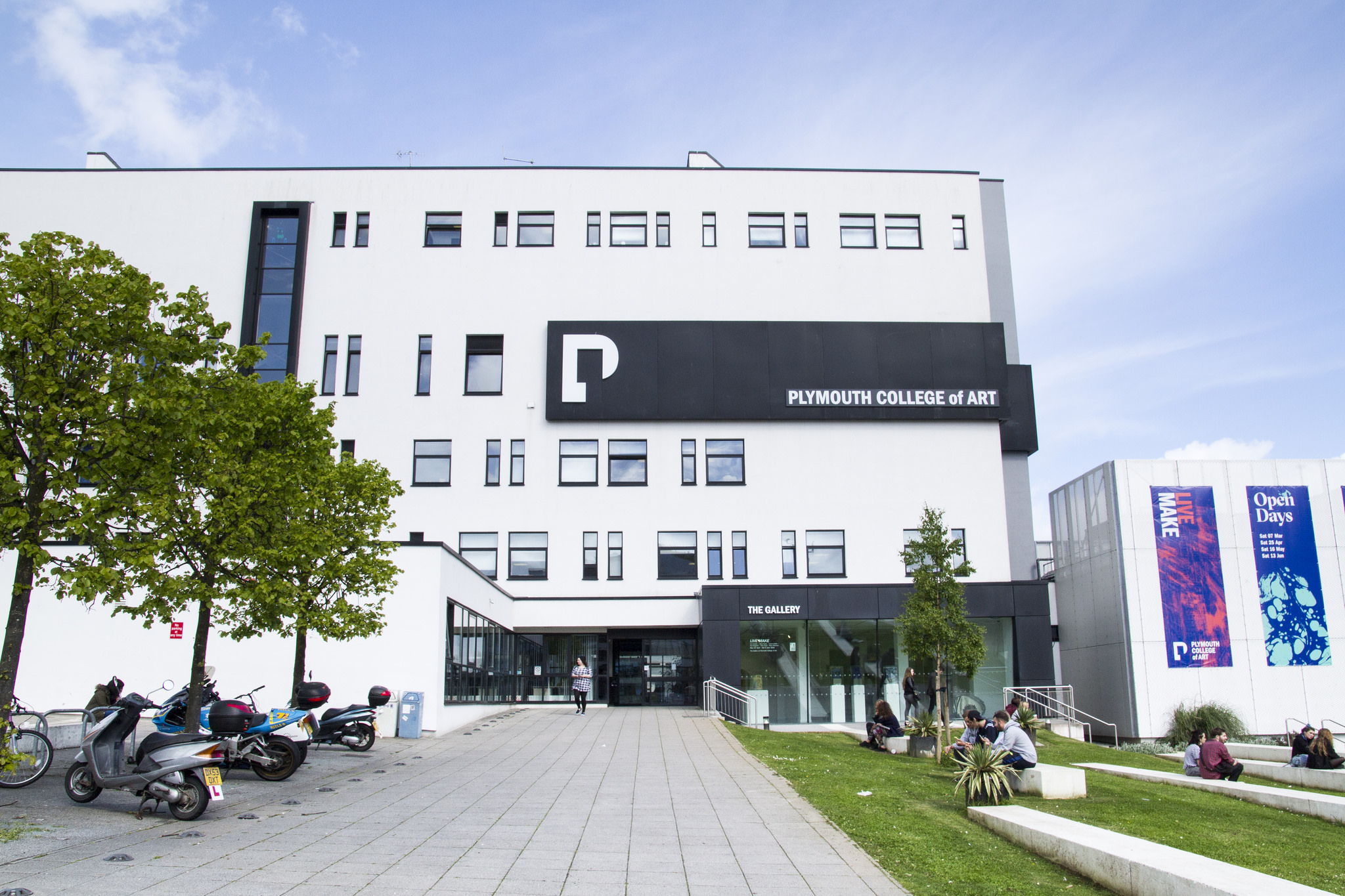
Exterior of Arts University Plymouth main building and gallery space

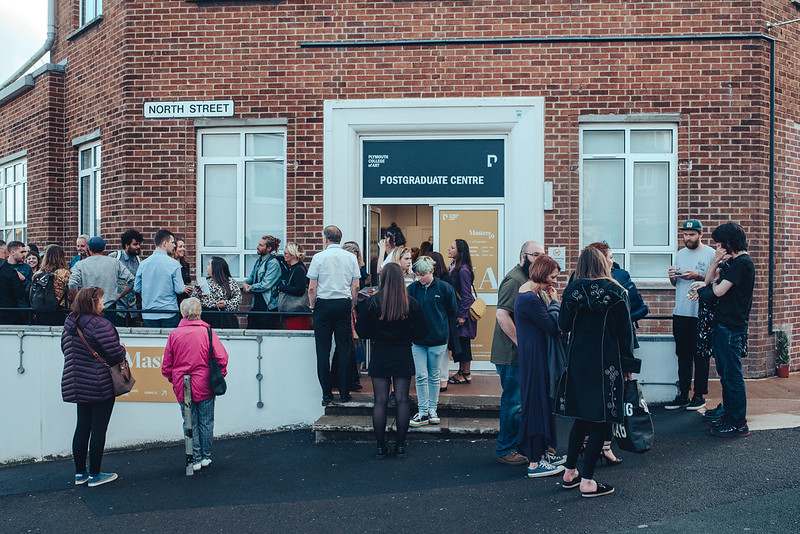
Arts University Plymouth Postgraduate Centre

Arts University Plymouth is a public university located in Plymouth in South West England. The former Plymouth College of Art was officially granted university status in 2022. In April 2019 the specialist college was awarded taught degree awarding powers (TDAP) by the Quality Assurance Agency for Higher Education (QAA), granting the institution the authority to award and accredit its own BA (Hons) degrees and Masters awards.

The University provides creative education at undergraduate, postgraduate and pre-degree level, specialising in the fields of art, design, crafts and media. Pre-Degree courses include the Foundation Diploma in Art and Design, which is taught at Palace Studios, the University's dedicated Foundation Diploma building.

Arts University Plymouth is an official Adobe Creative Campus.

== History ==
Founded as the Plymouth Drawing School in 1856, Arts University Plymouth is one of the last specialist art schools in the United Kingdom.

The University has delivered higher education (HE) provision for over 20 years, initially as part of an indirect funding partnership with the University of Plymouth to develop foundation degrees. In 2006, the Higher Education Funding Council for England (HEFCE) awarded directly funded student numbers to Arts University Plymouth (then known as Plymouth College of Art and Design), and the University transferred its validation arrangements to the Open University (OU).

In December 2008, Plymouth College of Art and Design was renamed to Plymouth College of Art.

In 2013, the college founded the city-centre free school for 4 to 16-year-olds Plymouth School of Creative Arts. Together the school and college have established a radical and progressive continuum of creative learning and practice in the region that extends from early years to Masters level study. The school's landmark building The Red House was formally opened by Tate Director Sir Nicholas Serota who hailed the opening as "a historic event in the history of education in this country".

In 2019, Plymouth College of Art received Taught Degree Awarding Powers (TDAP), granting them, as an independent Higher Education Institution, the power to award their own degrees. In autumn 2020, the first cohort of undergraduate and postgraduate students graduated from Plymouth College of Art with an award accredited by the institution.

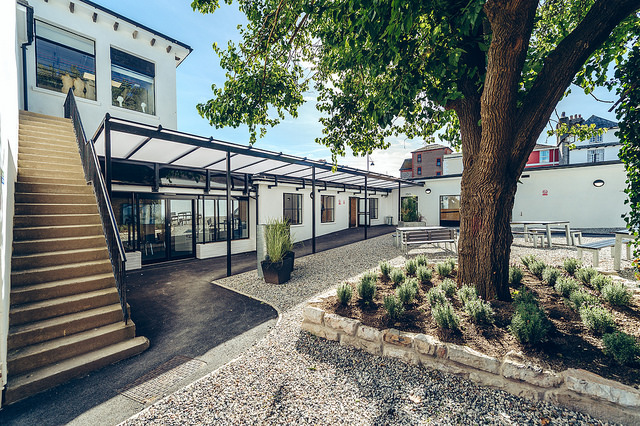
Palace Court, Plymouth College of Art's Pre-Degree campus

In May 2022, the College was awarded University status and was renamed Arts University Plymouth.

== Academic profile ==
In 2024, Arts University Plymouth was ranked as the top university in the South West region, 2nd in the UK in the category of Facilities, ranked 4th in the UK in the category of University of the Year, 4th in the UK in the category of Lecturers & Teaching Quality, and 3rd in the UK for Student Support at the Whatuni Student Choice Awards (WUSCAs).

Arts University Plymouth was also the highest-scoring arts university in the UK in the National Student Survey in 2025, ranked highest in 18 out of the 27 questions that students are asked in the NSS 2025.

Mirror (formerly The Gallery), Plymouth Arts Cinema and Fab Lab Plymouth are located in the city centre campus, offering a range of short courses, masterclasses, and National Art & Design Young Arts Club. The university is a UK Advisory Council Member of the Creative Industries Federation, a Member of the Crafts Council Advisory Group, a founding associate of Tate’s Tate Exchange programme and a Steering Group Member of the Cultural Learning Alliance.

=== Student body ===
The University caters for approximately 2,000 students, with around 85% of full-time students on Higher Education courses in 2017. Over 250 members of staff are employed by the university. Students are enrolled from the local area, the wider south-west region, and further afield in the United Kingdom. The university also attracts international students,

=== Administration ===
The University is administered by a corporation.

== Students' Union ==
Arts University Plymouth Students' Union, usually abbreviated "AUP:SU" is based at the Tavistock Place campus. It was established in 1998. Each year, students elect a paid Student Union President who will represent them for the following year, along with a team of voluntary Student Union Executive Committee positions. The Union offers a range of services (such as the Student Union Food Bank) and a number of events throughout the year, including Freshers.

In 2021, Arts University Plymouth Students’ Union (AUP:SU) won Best Campaign Supporting Student Wellbeing at the 2021 Think Student Awards, beating leading international universities to be selected as the winner by the Student Pulse panel of 40,000 students.

== Notable alumni ==
Alumni include:

- Harry Borden, photographer
- Charles Dance, British actor
- Candice Farmer, photographer
- Catriona Fraser, photographer, curator, and art dealer
- Florence Given, feminist writer and illustrator
- Josephine Harris, glass engraver and painter
- Raymond Hawkey, British designer and author
- Malcolm Le Grice, Artist and filmmaker
- David Mckee, British author
- Keith Rowe, British musician and painter (AMM)

=== Honorary degrees ===
In 2009, the university awarded two honorary degrees which were conferred by The Open University. Artist Anthony Frost was awarded an honorary Master of The Open University and Raindance founder Elliot Grove was awarded an honorary Doctor of The Open University for their services to art and education and culture, respectively.

The university has since awarded honorary fellowships to artist David McKee, filmmaker Bela Tarr, Pablo Helguera, curator Anne Barlow, ceramic artist Clare Twomey, artist George Shaw, artist Kurt Jackson, Sir John Sorrell and Lady Frances Sorrell, and Sir Nicholas Serota and Richard Deacon,

== See also ==
- Armorial of UK universities
- List of art universities and colleges in Europe
- List of universities in the United Kingdom
- Visual arts education
