= Bruno Decc =

Brazilian film director and writer

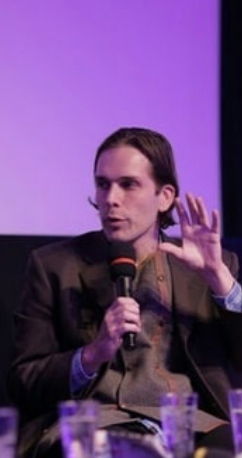
- Decc in 2019
- Born: São Paulo, Brazil
- Occupations: Director and screenwriter
- Notable credits: Escape from Brazil; Two Signs' Den: Epilogue; Carpe Aeternitatem; Breu; Nootropic

Bruno Decc is a Brazilian film director and writer. He studied architecture and urbanism at the University of São Paulo and started working on films in 2007.

== Career ==
Decc started as a director, writer, producer and photographer in indie film making and advertising through his production company, Decc Films. From 2011 to 2018, he worked closely with Maria Farinha Films, producing, writing and directing documentaries, short films and television shows. Since 2019, he's been consulting for Escape Films ASBL in Belgium.

In 2016, his ninth short film (Two Signs' Den: Epilogue) won Best Experimental Film Award at the VI Aesthetica Short Film Festival, in York, England.

In 2018, he co-directed a TV documentary titled Museu Entre Tempos (Interage Museum) about the São Paulo Museum of Modern Art and the political climate in the Brazilian art world following the Impeachment of Dilma Rousseff in 2015.
