= The Day the Crayons Came Home =

2015 children's book

- Author: Drew Daywalt
- Illustrator: Oliver Jeffers
- Language: English
- Genre: children's books picture books
- Publisher: Penguin Round House
- Publication date: 2015
- Publication place: United States

The Day the Crayons Came Home is a 2015 children's book written by Drew Daywalt and illustrated by Oliver Jeffers. The book is a sequel to The Day the Crayons Quit. The book is about crayons who are scattered around the world and in the house of a boy named Duncan, and how they communicate with him through postcards. The book is a colorful picture book.

Published by Penguin Round House and promoted by Arty Crafty Kids book club craft and activities for kids.

The Day the Crayons Came Home won the GoodReads Best Picture Book 2015.
