= Candice Farmer =

English underwater photographer

- Born: 1970 (age 55–56); Uckfield, England
- Education: Plymouth College of Art and Design
- Occupations: Underwater and beauty photographer, environmentalist

Candice Farmer (born c. 1970) is an underwater fashion and beauty photographer, based in Uckfield, England. She is known professionally by the mononym, Candice.

== Photography ==
Farmer gained a National Diploma and Higher National Diploma in photography at Plymouth College of Art and Design. The course included a module on underwater photography which she has since specialised in. She also studied business studies.

Farmer had her first exhibition in 2001.

She was the recipient of a Shell LiveWIRE award, an enterprise scheme to help support young entrepreneurs into business.

Farmer has worked commercially for British Airways and provided fashion stills for a PBS documentary on "How Art Made the World". She also worked for the department store Harrods, the skin cream brand Nivea, the supermarket chain Sainsbury's, the British retailer W H Smith, the British retailer FHM, and the fashion magazines Cosmopolitan, GQ, Harper’s & Queen, Vogue, Elle and Marie Claire.

== Fresh2o ==
In 2004 Farmer founded the clean drinking water initiative Fresh2o, intended to raise awareness and funding for fresh water projects. As part of her campaign she has created a series of celebrity photographs to highlight the cause, including as models Keira Knightley, Kelly Brook, Sir Nick Faldo, Nicko McBrain and Tamzin Outhwaite. Supporters also include Janet Jackson, Jay Kay, Will Smith, Ellen Whitaker, Bear Grylls, and Zac Efron.

== Personal life ==
Candice is a professional diver and accomplished show-jumper, having competed in Switzerland for many years and now in the UK.
