= Studio AKA =

British animation studio

- Formerly: Pizzaz! Pictures (1989-2000); AKA Pizazz (2000-2001)
- Industry: Entertainment
- Genre: Animation
- Founded: 20 January 1989; 37 years ago
- Headquarters: London, United Kingdom
- Key people: Marc Craste (Partner & Director); Philip Hunt (Partner & Creative Director); Sue Goffe (Partner & Head of Production); Grant Orchard (Director)
- Products: Hey Duggee
- Production output: Television Production
- Website: www.studioaka.co.uk

Studio AKA is a British animation studio producing television commercials, TV programmes and short films. The company was founded in 1989 (as Pizzaz Pictures). Notable productions include Hey Duggee, a TV series aimed at 2 to 5 year olds produced for CBeebies, which was recommissioned for a second and third series and which was awarded an International Emmy in 2017 and a BAFTA, and Lost and Found, an animated short film based on the children’s picture book by Oliver Jeffers, which won a BAFTA in 2009.
