= Richard Haythornthwaite =

British business executive and Chairman of Mastercard (born 1956)

- Born: Richard Neil Haythornthwaite; December 1956 (age 69)
- Education: The Queen's College, Oxford; MIT Sloan School of Management
- Occupation: Business executive
- Known for: Chairman of MasterCard, Centrica and Creative Industries Federation

Richard Neil "Rick" Haythornthwaite (born December 1956) is a British business executive. He is well-known for leading several companies including being the chairman of MasterCard and the Creative Industries Federation.

Previously, he was also made independent non-executive chairman of Ocado Group, replacing Ocado Group chairman Stuart Rose by the time of the company's May 2021 annual general meeting.

Currently, he serves as chair of NatWest Group, a post he has held since 2024, non-executive director of The AA, and advisory partner at investment bank, Moelis & Co.

== Early life ==
Richard Neil Haythornthwaite was born in December 1956. He graduated from The Queen's College, Oxford, where he received a bachelor of arts degree in geology. He earned a master's degree from the MIT Sloan School of Management as a Sloan Fellow.

== Career ==
Haythornthwaite was an executive for BP from 1978 to 1995. He worked as General Manager of the Magnus oilfield, operated by BP Exploration, and later worked as the president of BP Venezuela.

Haythornthwaite worked as the chief executive for Europe and Asia and group chief executive of Blue Circle Industries from 1997 to 2001, preparing it for its sale to Lafarge for £3.1 billion in cash. He worked as the chief executive officer of Invensys from 2001 to 2005. He was a partner at Star Capital Partners from 2006 to 2008. He also worked as the chairman of Network Rail.

Haythornthwaite became chairman of MasterCard in May 2006 and of the Creative Industries Federation in 2017. He stepped down as chairman at Mastercard with effect from January 2021, to assume the role of independent non-executive chairman for Ocado Group, after Ocado's AGM in May 2021. From 2008 to 2016, he was employed in an advisory role by PetroSaudi International (UK) Ltd.

Haythornthwaite has served on the boards of directors of the Imperial Chemical Industries, Lafarge, Premier Oil and Land Securities. On 6 March 2018, he joined the global independent investment bank, Moelis & Company, as an advisory partner in the U.K. He was chairman of Centrica from January 2014 to February 2019.

In March 2021, Rick Haythornthwaite was appointed non-executive chairman of The AA. He later stepped down from his position as chairman to take up a new role as chairman of NatWest in September 2023, but remained on the AA board as a non-executive director.

== Philanthropy ==
Haythornthwaite served as the chairman of the board of governors of the Southbank Centre for seven years, standing down in January 2015. He also served as the chairman of the board of the World Wide Web Foundation. He is a Fellow of the Royal Society of Arts. In April 2022 it was announced that the UK prime minister had approved the appointment of Haythornthwaite to chair an independent review of the terms and conditions of service of the UK Armed Forces.
