= Creative Wales =

Welsh Government agency

- Cymru Greadigol (Welsh)

Agency overview
- Formed: 2020
- Type: Executive non-departmental public body
- Agency executive: Jason Thomas, Director of Culture, Sport and Tourism
- Website: www.creative.wales

Creative Wales (Welsh: Cymru Greadigol) is a Welsh Government economic development agency that supports the creative industries in Wales. Creative Wales is an internal agency sitting within the Economy, Energy and Transport group of the Welsh Government.

Creative Wales was launched on 29 January 2020.

== See also ==
- Arts Council of Wales
- Creative Scotland
