= John Sorrell (designer) =

British designer

Sir John Sorrell CBE Hon FRIBA HonFREng

Personal details
- Born: John Sorrell; 28 February 1945 (age 81) London, UK
- Spouse: Frances Newell
- Occupation: Designer, education advocate

Sir John Sorrell CBE Hon FRIBA HonFREng (born 28 February 1945) is a British designer and an advocate and campaigner for creative education and for the creative industries.

== Early life ==
Sorrell was born in London in 1945 during an air raid in the Second World War. He attended Saturday morning art classes at Hornsey School of Art when he was 14. He then studied art and design there full-time between the ages of 16 and 19. His experience of Saturday morning art classes inspired his later foundation of the National Art & Design Saturday Club.

== Career ==
John Sorrell set up his first business, Goodwin Sorrell, in 1964 with Chuck Goodwin. He co-founded the design and identity business Newell and Sorrell in 1976 with his wife, Frances Newell. The couple became one of Europe's biggest and most successful identity consultancies, with clients including British Airways, the Body Shop and the Royal Mail. The business won numerous awards for creativity and effectiveness.

In 1997, Newell and Sorrell merged with Interbrand to form Interbrand Newell & Sorrell. John and Frances left Interbrand Newell & Sorrell in 2000.

== The Sorrell Foundation ==
John and Frances Sorrell co-founded the Sorrell Foundation in 1999 with the aim of inspiring creativity in young people and improving lives with good design.

The Sorrell Foundation has worked with more than 100,000 young people across the UK on a range of programmes, including Joinedupdesignforschools, the Young Design Programme, myplace and Design out Crime. In 2009, John and Frances set up the National Saturday Club network. John is co-chair of the Sorrell Foundation.

== National Saturday Club ==
Sorrell is co-founder and trustee of the National Saturday Club, a new charity formed in 2016 to take over the development of the Saturday Clubs from the Sorrell Foundation.

The National Saturday Club network offers young people aged 13–16 the opportunity to study on Saturdays for free. Currently there are around 127 Clubs around the UK, taking in place in 104 colleges, universities and cultural institutions to study: Art&Design, Craft&Making, Fashion&Business, Film&Screen, Performance&Theatre, Science&Engineering, Society&Change and Writing&Talking.

== London Design Festival and London Design Biennale ==
Sorrell co-founded London Design Festival in 2003, and chaired it until 2023. London Design Festival celebrates and promotes London's and the UK's creativity. The Festival brings a multitude of events to an international audience each September and has become the standard bearer for over 100 design festivals set up in cities around the world since its inception. He co-founded the London Design Biennale in 2016, and was its president until 2023.

This biannual exhibition, staged at Somerset House, invites participating countries and cities to exhibit original design installations in response to a theme. Installations are curated by the leading museums and design organisations in the world.

== Other roles ==
Sorrell was a trustee of the Victoria & Albert Museum from 2011 to 2019, and Chairman of University of the Arts London from 2013 to 2018. University of the Arts London is Europe's largest specialist arts and design university.

A UK Business Ambassador from 2009 to 2019, Sorrell was appointed by successive Prime Ministers to champion the UK's Creative Industries sector overseas. He founded the Creative Industries Federation in 2014 – the independent voice for the UK's creative industries. The Creative Industries Federation unites the UK's diverse arts and creative industries to secure the policies and funding needed to further Britain's global success as a cultural powerhouse. In April 2017, he stepped down as chair of the Creative Industries Federation.

Sorrell chaired the UK Design Council from 1994 to 2000 after carrying out a major review, which created a blueprint for the transformation and future strategy for the organisation. He was Chair of CABE (Commission for Architecture and the Built Environment) from 2004 to 2009, a Vice-President of the Chartered Society of Designers from 1989 to 1992, and Chairman of the Design Business Association from 1990 to 1992.

== Honours and awards ==
Sorrell was awarded a Knighthood in the 2008 New Year Honours List 'for services to the Creative Industries'. He was appointed CBE in 1996, and was awarded the Royal Society of Arts Bicentenary Medal in 1998.

He holds eight Honorary Doctorates, was elected an Honorary Fellow of the Royal Institute of British Architects in 2002 and an Honorary Fellow of the Royal Academy of Engineering in 2009.

== Publications ==
Sorrell has published four books: Creative Island (Laurence King Publishing, 2002) and Creative Island II (Laurence King Publishing, 2009) feature inspired design from Great Britain. He co-authored Joinedupdesignforschools (Merrell, 2005) with his wife, Frances Sorrell. He co-authored 'Virtuous Circle' with Darren Henley and Paul Roberts (Elliott & Thompson, 2014).
