= Creative Scotland =

Government agency in Edinburgh, Scotland

- Alba Chruthachail; Creative Scotlan

Agency overview
- Formed: 2010
- Preceding agencies: Scottish Arts Council; Scottish Screen
- Type: Executive non-departmental public body
- Headquarters: Edinburgh, Scotland
- Annual budget: £89.0 million (2025)
- Agency executive: Iain Munro, Chief Executive
- Website: www.creativescotland.com

Creative Scotland (Scottish Gaelic: Alba Chruthachail [ˈal̪ˠapə ˈxɾuhəxal]; Scots: Creative Scotlan) is the development body for the arts and creative industries in Scotland. Based in Edinburgh, it is an executive non-departmental public body of the Scottish Government.

== Establishment ==
The organisation was created by the passing of the Public Services Reform (Scotland) Act 2010 and inherited the functions of Scottish Screen and the Scottish Arts Council on 1 July 2010. An interim company, Creative Scotland 2009, was set up to assist the transition from the existing organisations.

Creative Scotland has the general functions of:

- identifying, supporting and developing quality and excellence in the arts and culture from those engaged in artistic and other creative endeavours,
- promoting understanding, appreciation and enjoyment of the arts and culture,
- encouraging as many people as possible to access and participate in the arts and culture,
- realising, as far as reasonably practicable to do so, the value and benefits (in particular, the national and international value and benefits) of the arts and culture,
- encouraging and supporting artistic and other creative endeavours which contribute to an understanding of Scotland's national culture in its broad sense as a way of life,
- promoting and supporting industries and other commercial activity the primary focus of which is the application of creative skills.

== Controversies ==
Since its inception, Creative Scotland has been involved in some controversies, and been challenged by key figures in the arts and film industries in the country. In 2012, 400 artists, writers, playwrights and musicians' protesting of Creative Scotland's management led to the resignation of Creative Scotland's then-chief Andrew Dixon.

In March 2011, Creative Scotland's expenditures were debated in the Scottish Parliament, during which MSP Hugh Henry lodged a motion expressing concern that "in a time of austerity, Creative Scotland should consider grant applications more carefully before making awards" and "further stating that he, "cannot understand the justification for £58,000 of taxpayers’ money being used to fund a dance programme based on the works of Alfred Hitchcock, or paying for travel to Tonga to study Polynesian dance," and called for an investigation into whether taxpayer money was being used responsibily. This was met with an amendment from MSP Linda Fabiani, which instead asserted that Parliament "considers that throughout history the inspiration for artistic expression has come from all manner of sources, some of which have appeared unlikely at the time," citing as an example, an acclaimed 2001 modern dance performance in Hampden Park by the Scottish Youth Dance company in which the choreography was based on Archie Gemmill’s 1978 World Cup goal against Holland. She further asserted that, "there should be no place for politicians to limit or dictate the subject matter of any art form," and denounced "any suggestion that difficult economic circumstances can be used to justify censorship of the arts."

In January 2015, the organization was lambasted by filmmakers for offering less than half of the money required to a blockbuster film The Rezort wishing to shoot in Scotland, which resulted in the production moving to Wales.

In June 2018 Janet Archer resigned as chief executive of Creative Scotland after joining the organisation in July 2013. She was replaced by deputy chief executive Iain Munro, who assumed the role of chief executive.

Notable critics of Creative Scotland in the Scottish arts world include Liz Lochhead, Don Paterson, Ian Rankin, Andrea Gibb, David Greig, John Byrne, Alasdair Gray and James Kelman.

== See also ==
- Scottish Mortgage Investment Trust Book Awards, organised by Creative Scotland
- Arts Council of Wales, Creative Wales, similar organisations in Wales
- Arts Council England
- Arts Council of Northern Ireland
