= Blue Peter Book Award =

Literary award

Green Peter Book Award
- Awarded for: Children's literature
- Country: United Kingdom
- Presented by: Blue Peter
- First award: 2000; 26 years ago
- Final award: 2022; 4 years ago

Television/radio coverage
- Network: CBBC

The Blue Peter Book Awards were a set of literary awards for children's books conferred by the BBC television programme Blue Peter. They were inaugurated in 2000 for books published in 1999 and 2000. The awards were managed by reading charity, BookTrust, from 2006 until the final award in 2022. From 2013 until the final award, there were two award categories: Best Story and Best Book with Facts.

The awards were discontinued in 2022, one month after the end of the Costa Book Awards, which included a category for children's book, leaving only three widely recognized awards for children's literature (the Kate Greenaway Medal, the Carnegie Medal, and the Waterstones Children's Book Prize).

== Categories ==
The Book of the Year dated from 2000 when there were also some "Voters' Awards" (2000 to 2002). Previously there were award categories for:

- Most Fun Story with Pictures, from 2007
- Best Illustrated Book to Read Aloud, 2004 to 2006
- Best Book with Facts, from 2003
- Best New Information Book, 2002
- Favourite Story, 2011
- Book I Couldn't Put Down, 2000 to 2010

Three books in each category were announced 4 December 2014 and considered by the panel of 200 children from 10 schools. The two winners for the 2015 awards were announced on 5 March 2015, or World Book Day (UK and Ireland).

== Winners ==
Blue Peter Book Award winners
Year	Category	Author	Title	Ref.
2000	Book of the Year	Geraldine McCaughrean, illus. by Jason Cockcroft	A Pilgrim's Progress, retelling of The Pilgrim's Progress	
2000	Best Book to Read Aloud	Julia Donaldson, illus. by Axel Scheffler	The Gruffalo	
2000	Book I Couldn't Put Down	Alan Gibbons	Shadow of the Minotaur	
2000	Special Book to Keep Forever	Geraldine McCaughrean, illus. by Jason Cockcroft	A Pilgrim's Progress	
2000	Voters' Awards: Best Book With Facts in It		Guinness Book of World Records	
2000	Voters' Awards: Best Book to Share	J. K. Rowling	Harry Potter and the Goblet of Fire	
2000	Voters' Awards: Book that Made Me Laugh the Loudest	Roald Dahl, illus. by Quentin Blake	Matilda	
2001	Book of the Year	William Nicholson	The Wind Singer	
2001	Best Book to Keep Forever	Geraldine McCaughrean	The Kite Rider	
2001	Best Book to Read Aloud	Allan Ahlberg and Paul Howard	The Bravest Ever Bear	
2001	Book I Couldn't Put Down	William Nicholson	The Wind Singer	
2001	Voters' Awards: Best Book of Knowledge	Terry Deary	Rotten Romans	
2001	Voters' Awards: Best Storybook	J. K. Rowling	Harry Potter and the Philosopher's Stone	
2002	Book of the Year	Nicky Singer	Feather Boy	
2002	Best Book to Read Aloud	Ted Dewan	Crispin, the Pig Who Had It All	
2002	Best New Information Book	Lucy Lethbridge	Ada Lovelace: The Computer Wizard of Victorian England	
2002	Book I Couldn't Put Down	Nicky Singer	Feather Boy	
2002	Voter's Awards: Best Book With Facts In	Terry Deary, illus. by Martin Brown	Terrible Tudors	
2002	Voter's Awards: Best Storybook	Jacqueline Wilson	The Story of Tracy Beaker	
2003	Book of the Year	Philip Reeve	Mortal Engines	
2003	Best Book to Read Aloud	Julia Donaldson, illus. by Axel Scheffler	Room on the Broom	
2003	Best Book with Facts	Richard Platt, illus. by Chris Riddell	Pirate Diary	
2003	Book I Couldn't Put Down	Philip Reeve	Mortal Engines	
2004	Book of the Year	Simon Bartram	Man on the Moon	
2004	Best Book with Facts	Daniel Hahn, Leonie Flynn, and Susan Reuben (eds.)	The Ultimate Book Guide	
2004	Best Illustrated Book to Read Aloud	Simon Bartram	Man on the Moon	
2004	Book I Couldn't Put Down	Eleanor Updale	Montmorency	
2005	Book of the Year	Michael Morpurgo	Private Peaceful	
2005	Best Book with Facts	Simon Chapman	Explorers Wanted! At the North Pole	
2005	Best Illustrated Book to Read Aloud	Julia Donaldson, illus. by Axel Scheffler	The Snail and the Whale	
2005	Book I Couldn't Put Down	Michael Morpurgo	Private Peaceful	
2006	Book of the Year	Oliver Jeffers	Lost and Found	
2006	Best Book with Facts	Giles Thaxton	Spud Goes Green	
2006	Best Illustrated Book to Read Aloud	Oliver Jeffers	Lost and Found	
2006	Book I Couldn't Put Down	Charlie Higson	Blood Fever	
2007	Book of the Year	S. F. Said, illus. by Dave McKean	The Outlaw Varjak Paw	
2007	Best Book with Facts	Tony Robinson	The Worst Children's Jobs in History	
2007	Book I Couldn't Put Down	S. F. Said, illus. by Dave McKean	The Outlaw Varjak Paw	
2007	Most Fun Story With Pictures	Andy Stanton and David Tazzyman	You're a Bad Man, Mr Gum	
2008	Prize didn't run			
2009	Book of the Year	Matt Haig	Shadow Forest	
2010	Book of the Year	Ali Sparkes	Frozen in Time	
2011	Book of the Year	Lauren St. John	Dead Man's Cove	
2012	Book of the Year	Gareth P. Jones	The Considine Curse	
2013	Best Book with Facts	Nick Arnold and Tony De Saulles	House of Horrors	
2013	Best Story	Liz Pichon	Tom Gates: Genius Ideas (Mostly)	
2014	Best Book with Facts	Tony Robinson, illus. by Del Thorpe	Tony Robinson's Weird World of Wonders: World War II	
2014	Best Story	Katherine Rundell	Rooftoppers	
2015	Best Book with Facts	Andy Seed, illus. by Scott Garrett	The Silly Book of Side-Splitting Stuff	
2015	Best Story	Pamela Butchart, illus. by Thomas Flintham	The Spy Who Loved School Dinners	
2016	Best Book with Facts	Adam Frost	The Epic Book of Epicness	
2016	Best Story	Ross MacKenzie	The Nowhere Emporium	
2017	Best Book with Facts	David Long, illus. by Kerry Hyndman	Survivors	
2017	Best Story	Kieran Larwood, illus. by David Wyatt	Podkin One Ear	
2018	Best Book with Facts	Susan Martineau, illus. by Vicky Barker	Real-Life Mysteries	
2018	Best Story	Cressida Cowell	The Wizards of Once	
2019	Best Book with Facts	Clive Gifford, illus. by Marc-Etienne Peintre	The Colours of History	
2019	Best Story	Onjali Q. Raúf	The Boy at the Back of the Class	
2020	Best Book with Facts	Amanda Li, illus. by Amy Blackwell, designed by Kim Hankinson and Jack Clucas	Rise Up: Ordinary Kids with Extraordinary Stories	
2020	Best Story	Vashti Hardy	Wildspark	
2021	Best Book with Facts	Mike Barfield, illus. by Jess Bradley	A Day in the Life of a Poo, A Gnu And You	
2021	Best Story	Elle McNicoll	A Kind of Spark	
2022	Best Book with Facts	Christiane Dorion, illus. by Gosia Herba	Invented by Animals	
2022	Best Story	Hannah Gold	The Last Bear	

== Shortlists ==
2020

- Best Book with Facts:
  - Rise Up: Ordinary Kids with Extraordinary Stories by Amanda Li, illus. Amy Blackwell designed by Kim Hankinson and Jack Clucas (Buster Books)
  - Fanatical About Frogs by Owen Davey (Flying Eye)
  - How To Be An Astronaut and Other Space Jobs by Dr Sheila Kanani & Sol Linero (Nosy Crow)
- Best Story
  - Wildspark by Vashti Hardy (Scholastic)
  - Owen and the Soldier by Lisa Thompson, illus. Mike Lowery (Barrington Stoke)
  - Vote for Effie by Laura Wood (Scholastic)

2019

- Best Book with Facts:
  - The Colours of History by Clive Gifford, illus. Marc-Etienne Peintre (QED Publishing)
  - Professor Astro Cat’s Human Body Odyssey by Dr Dominic Walliman, illus. Ben Newman (Flying Eye Books)
  - The Element in the Room: Investigating the Atomic Ingredients that Make Up Your Home by Mike Barfield, illus. Lauren Humphrey (Laurence King)
- Best Story
  - The Boy at the Back of the Class by Onjali Q Raúf (Orion Children's Books)
  - The Clockwork Crow by Catherine Fisher (Firefly)
  - The House With Chicken Legs by Sophie Anderson (Usborne)

2018

- Best Book with Facts:
  - Real-Life Mysteries by Susan Martineau, illus. Vicky Barker (b small)
  - Beyond the Sky: You and the Universe by Dara Ó Briain, illus. Dan Bramall (Scholastic)
  - Corpse Talk: Ground-Breaking Scientists by Adam Murphy and Lisa Murphy (David Fickling Books)
- Best Story
  - The Wizards of Once by Cressida Cowell (Hodder Children's Books)
  - The Island at the End of Everything by Kiran Millwood Hargrave (Chicken House)
  - Wed Wabbit by Lissa Evans (David Fickling Books)

2017

- Best Book with Facts:
  - Destination: Space by Christoph Englert, illus. Tom Clohosy Cole (Wide Eyed Editions)
  - Football School: Where Football Explains the World by Alex Bellos and Ben Lyttleton, illus. Spike Gerrell (Walker Books)
  - Survivors by David Long (Faber and Faber)
- Best Story:
  - Lost Tales by Adam Murphy (David Fickling Books)
  - Podkin One Ear by Kieran Larwood, illus. David Wyatt (Faber and Faber)
  - Time Travelling with a Hamster by Ross Welford (Harper Collins )

2016

- Best Book with Facts:
  - The Epic Book of Epicness by Adam Frost
  - The Silly Book of Weird and Wacky Words by Andy Seed, illus. by Scott Garrett
  - FactFeed by Penny Arlon
- Best Story:
  - The Astounding Broccoli Boy by Frank Cottrell-Boyce, illus. by Steven Lenton
  - The Boy Who Sailed the Ocean in an Armchair by Lara Williamson
  - The Nowhere Emporium by Ross MacKenzie

2015

- Best Book with Facts:
  - Animalium by Jenny Broom, illus. Katie Scott (Big Picture Press)
  - The Silly Book of Side-Splitting Stuff by Andy Seed, illus. Scott Garrett (Bloomsbury)
  - Corpse Talk: Season 1 by Adam Murphy (David Fickling Books)
- Best Story
  - The Boy in the Tower by Polly Ho-Yen (DoubleDay)
  - Goth Girl and the Fete Worse Than Death by Chris Riddell (Walker)
  - The Spy Who Loved School Dinners by Pamela Butchart, illus. Thomas Flintham (Nosy Crow)

2014

- Best Book with Facts:
  - Marvellous Maths by Jonathan Litton, illus. Thomas Flintham (Templar Publishing)
  - The World in Infographics: Animal Kingdom by Jon Richards illus. Ed Simkins (Wayland)
  - Tony Robinson's Weird World of Wonders: World War II by Tony Robinson, illus. Del Thorpe (Macmillan)
- Favourite Story
  - Whale Boy by Nicola Davies (Random House)
  - Oliver and the Seawigs by Philip Reeve, illus. Sarah McIntyre (Oxford University Press)
  - Rooftoppers by Katherine Rundell (Faber & Faber)

2013

- Best Book with Facts:
  - House of Horrors (Horrible Science series) by Nick Arnold, illus. Tony De Saulles (Scholastic)
  - Fantastic Mr Dahl by Michael Rosen (Puffin)
  - Walter Tull's Scrapbook by Michaela Morgan (Frances Lincoln Children's Books) – about Walter Tull
- Favourite Story
  - Tom Gates: Genius Ideas (Mostly) by Liz Pichon (Scholastic)
  - Hero on a Bicycle by Shirley Hughes (Walker)
  - The Boy Who Swam With Piranhas by David Almond, illus. Oliver Jeffers (Walker )

2012

- Best Book with Facts:
  - The Official Countdown to the London 2012 Games by Simon Hart (Carlton Books)
  - Discover the Extreme World by Camilla de la Bedoyere, Clive Gifford, John Farndon, Steve Parker, Stewart Ross and Philip Steele (Miles Kelly)
- Favourite Story
  - The Considine Curse by Gareth P. Jones (Bloomsbury)
  - A Year without Autumn by Liz Kessler (Orion Children's Books)

2011

- Most Fun Story with Pictures:
  - Lunatics and Luck (Raven Mysteries, 3) by Marcus Sedgwick, illus. Pete Williamson (Orion Children's Books)
  - Alienography by Chris Riddell (Macmillan)
  - Mr Gum and the Cherry Tree by Andy Stanton, illus. David Tazzyman (Egmont)
- Best Book with Facts:
  - Do Igloos Have Loos by Mitchell Symons (Doubleday)
  - How the World Works by Christian Dorion, illus. Beverley Young, pop-ups designed by Andy Mansfield (Templar Publishing)
  - What You Need To Know Now: The World in Facts, Stats, and Graphics by Joe Fullman, Ian Graham, Sally Regan and Isabel Thomas, illus. Sheila Collins, Mik Gates, Jim Green, Katie Knutton, Phillip Letsu and Hoa Luc (Dorling Kindersley)
- Favourite Story
  - Dead Man's Cove (Laura Marlin Mystery, 1) by Lauren St John (Orion Children's Books)
  - A Web of Air (Mortal Engines prequel) by Philip Reeve (Scholastic Children's Books)
  - Tall Story by Candy Gourlay (David Fickling Books)

2010

- Most Fun Story with Pictures:
  - Peter the Penguin Pioneer by Daren King (Quercus)
  - Spells by Emily Gravett (Macmillan)
  - Dinkin Dings and the Frightening Things by Guy Bass (Stripes)
- Best Book with Facts:
  - Usborne Lift-the-flap Picture Atlas by Alex Frith and Kate Leake (Usborne)
  - Tail-End Charlie by Mick Manning and Brita Granström (Frances Lincoln Children's Books)
  - Why Eating Bogeys is Good for You by Mitchell Symons (Red Fox)
- Book I couldn't Put Down
  - Cosmic by Frank Cottrell Boyce (Macmillan)
  - The Boy Who Fell Down Exit 43 by Harriet Goodwin (Stripes)
  - Frozen in Time by Ali Sparkes (Oxford)

2009

- Most Fun Story with Pictures:
  - Mr Gum and the Dancing Bear by Andy Stanton and David Tazzyman (Egmont)
  - Fleabag by Helen Stephens (Alison Green Books)
  - Lost! The Hundred-Mile-An-Hour Dog by Jeremy Strong, illus. Rowan Clifford (Puffin Books)
- Best Book with Facts:
  - Archaeology Detectives by Simon Adams (Oxford University Press)
  - 100 Most Dangerous Things on the Planet by Anna Claybourne (A & C Black)
  - Planet in Peril (Horrible Geography series) by Anita Ganeri, illus. Mike Phillips (Scholastic)
- The Book I Couldn't Put Down:
  - Abela by Berlie Doherty (Andersen Press)
  - Shadow Forest by Matt Haig (Corgi)
  - Foul Play by Tom Palmer (Puffin)

2008

Prize didn't run.

2007

- Most Fun Story with Pictures:
  - Melrose and Croc Together at Christmas by Emma Chichester Clark
  - Charlie Cook's Favourite Books by Julia Donaldson and Axel Scheffler
  - You're a Bad Man, Mr Gum by Andy Stanton and David Tazzyman
- Best Book with Facts:
  - Why is Snot Green? by Glenn Murphy
  - The Worst Children's Jobs in History by Tony Robinson
  - A Little Guide to Wild Flowers by Charlotte Voake
- The Book I Couldn't Put Down:
  - Framed by Frank Cottrell Boyce
  - The Bad Spy's Guide by Pete Johnson
  - The Outlaw Varjak Paw by S. F. Said, illus. Dave McKean

2006

- Best Illustrated Book to Read Aloud:
  - Traction Man is Here by Mini Grey
  - Lost and Found by Oliver Jeffers (HarperCollins)
  - Guess Who's Coming for Dinner by John Kelly and Cathy Tincknell
- Best Book with Facts:
  - Connor's Eco Den by Pippa Goodhart
  - Poo by Nicola Davies and Neal Layton
  - Spud Goes Green by Giles Thaxton (Egmont)
- Book I Couldn't Put Down:
  - GRK and the Pelotti Gang by Joshua Doder
  - Blood Fever by Charlie Higson (Puffin)
  - The Amazing Story of Adolphus Tips by Michael Morpurgo

2005

- Best Illustrated Book to Read Aloud:
  - The Snail and the Whale by Julia Donaldson, illus. Axel Scheffler (Macmillan)
  - Biscuit Bear by Mini Grey (Red Fox)
  - Aristotle by Dick King-Smith, illus. Bob Graham (Walker)
  - Rapunzel: A Groovy Fairy Tale, retelling of "Rapunzel" by Lynn Roberts, illus. David Roberts (Chrysalis)
- Best Book with Facts:
  - Explorers Wanted! At the North Pole by Simon Chapman (Egmont)
  - What's My Family Tree? by Mick Manning, illus. Brita Granström (Watts)
  - Art Fraud Detective by Anna Nilsen, illus. Andy Parker (Kingfisher)
  - Rome in spectacular cross-section by Andrew Solway, illus. Stephen Biesty (Oxford University Press)
- Book I Couldn't Put Down:
  - Millions by Frank Cottrell Boyce (Macmillan)
  - SilverFin by Charlie Higson (Puffin)
  - Thora by Gillian Johnson (Hodder)
  - Private Peaceful by Michael Morpurgo (Collins)

2004

- Best Illustrated Book to Read Aloud:
  - The Woman Who Won Things by Allan Ahlberg, illus. Katharine McEwen (Walker Books)
  - Man on the Moon by Simon Bartram (Templar)
  - Quiet! by Paul Bright, illus. Guy Parker-Rees (Little Tiger Press)
  - Atticus the Storyteller's 100 Greek Myths by Lucy Coats, illus. Anthony Lewis (Orion)
  - The Smartest Giant in Town by Julia Donaldson, illus. Axel Scheffler (Macmillan)
- Best Book with Facts:
  - Journey into the Arctic by Bryan and Cherry Alexander (OUP)
  - Brilliant Brits: Shakespeare by Richard Brassey (Orion)
  - Who is Emily Davison? by Claudia Fitzherbert (Short Books)
  - The Ultimate Book Guide edited by Daniel Hahn (A & C Black)
  - I Spy: Shapes in Art by Lucy Micklethwaite (Collins)
- Book I Couldn't Put Down:
  - Stealing Stacey by Lynne Reid Banks (Collins)
  - Fat Boy Swim by Catherine Forde (Egmont)
  - The Garbage King by Elizabeth Laird (Macmillan)
  - When Mum Threw Out the Telly by E. F. Smith (Orchard Books)
  - Montmorency by Eleanor Updale (Scholastic)

== See also ==
- Children's Laureate
- Carnegie Medal
- Guardian Prize
- Kate Greenaway Medal
- Nestlé Smarties Book Prize
