= Glen Murphy (disambiguation) =

Glen Murphy (born 1957) is a British actor and producer.

Glen or Glenn Murphy may also refer to:

- Glen Murphy (rugby league) (born 1971), Australian rugby league footballer
- Glen Murphy (Pulse), part of the duo Twist and Pulse
- Glenn Murphy (footballer) (born 1949), Australian rules footballer
- Glenn Murphy, British children's author
