= The Girl Who Speaks Bear =

2019 middle-grade fantasy novel by Sophie Anderson

- Author: Sophie Anderson
- Genre: Middle grade fiction, fantasy
- Publisher: Usborne Publishing
- Publication date: September 5, 2019
- ISBN: 9781474940672

The Girl Who Speaks Bear is a 2019 middle-grade fantasy novel by Sophie Anderson, illustrated by Kathrin Honesta. Drawing on traditional Russian fairy tales, the story follows 12-year-old Yanka on a quest of self-discovery in a forbidden forest after she wakes up one morning with bear legs. The novel was well-received by critics and won the 2020 Indie Book Award for Children's Fiction.

== Plot ==
The Girl Who Speaks Bear follows the Yanka, a 12-year-old girl affectionately known as "Yanka the Bear" in her village. This nickname arises from her unusual physical attributes – her remarkable height and strength. However, what truly sets her apart is her unique upbringing. Until the age of two, Yanka was raised by a bear in the forest before her human mother found her in a bear cave. Although Yanka feels loved and supported by her family and friends, she senses that her life is missing something and that she doesn't truly belong, a feeling amplified by her otherness in the village.

This feeling is intensified when Yanka awakens to a startling revelation: she has bear legs. This discovery initially fills her with fear and confusion, though it also pushes her to learn more about her true history. To do so, Yanka embarks on a journey into the forbidden Snow Forest, accompanied by Mousetrap, the family's spirited weasel. Yanka's quest for self-discovery unfolds as she discovers she can understand what some of the forest creatures are saying to her. With this newfound knowledge, she rescues an elk named Yuri, confronts a wolf, encounters witches living in a house with chicken legs, and protects her loved ones from a formidable dragon. Along this path, Yanka uncovers her family's past: her grandfather, a human, made excessive wishes to the Lime Tree, resulting in a curse that transformed the family into bears.

Throughout her adventure, Yanka's experiences are interwoven with stories she's heard from Anatoly, a family friend who frequents the Snow Forest, and she discovers that the stories may have been more than fairytales.

== Reception ==
The Girl Who Speaks Bear was well-received by critics, including starred reviews from Booklist, Kirkus Reviews, and Publishers Weekly.

Kirkus called the book "marvelously charmed and charming" and highlighted how the "tale draws themes and inspiration from Russian fairy tales, deftly weaving the threads of these magical stories into Yanka's adventure and evoking the folklore, music, art, and customs of the Eastern European north". Similarly, Booklist's Stephanie Cohen noted that "readers who enjoyed Gregory Maguire's Egg and Spoon (2014), Rudyard Kipling's The Jungle Book, the Brothers Grimm, or Baba Yaga lore will revel in this new fairy tale that borrows from the old to make something new".

Publishers Weekly called The Girl Who Speaks Bear "a gem of a fairy tale," adding, "Anderson's sophomore effort offers a dynamic, memorable cast with rich personalities amid lasting messages about belonging, graceful acceptance of aid, and the power of stories". On behalf of The Bulletin of the Center for Children's Books, Natalie Berglind similarly noted that "light-hearted tidbits with the side cast take some of the weight from Yanka's relatable and powerful struggle to balance influences from her past and her hopes for the future". The School Librarian's Alison Brumwell also commented on the book's characters, writing, "Young readers will enjoy the humor of Mousetrap, always in search of a decent fish, the fiercely independent wolf, Ivan, and the Inept Yuri." Brumwell concluded by calling the novel "vibrant, lyrical", and "full of texture".

Berglind also praised the writing, saying, "Anderson's prose is a lyrical treat as she conveys the excitement of the village festival and the smells and sights of the forest in vivid detail".

School Library Journal also reviewed the novel.

== Awards and honors ==
The Girl Who Speaks Bear was named one of the best books of 2019 by The Guardian, as well as one of the best books of 2020 by The Bulletin of the Center for Children's Books.

Awards for The Girl Who Speaks Bear
Year	Award	Result	Ref.
2020	Indie Book Award for Children's Fiction	Winner	
2021	Carnegie Medal	Shortlist	
