= The Thief Who Sang Storms =

2022 middle-grade fantasy novel by Sophie Anderson

- Author: Sophie Anderson
- Genre: Middle grade fiction, fantasy
- Publisher: Usborne Publishing
- Publication date: March 31, 2022
- ISBN: 9781474979061

The Thief Who Sang Storms is a 2022 middle grade fantasy novel by Sophie Anderson. Inspired by a Russian folk poem about Nightingale the Robber, the novel follows Linnet, a 13-year-old girl who chooses to take a stand against oppressive forces.

== Plot ==
The Thief Who Sang Storms follows 13-year-old Linnet, who lives on the island of Morovia. Until recently, humans and magical bird-like beings called alkonosts lived together in relative harmony. After a tragic storm kills both the human and alkonost queens, many humans, particularly those in positions of power, blame on the alkonosts' magic. This includes Captain Ilya, a human royal guard opts to persecute alkanosts by forbidding them to use their magic, banning them from public places, and relegating them to a swamp. Linnet, an alkonost, yearns for her previous life. In addition to the societal unrest, the catastrophic event not only took her mother's life but also left her father emotionally devastated.

When human guards apprehend Linnet's father, she realizes that simply longing for peace won't change their circumstances. Instead, she decides to take immense risks to bring about the peace she so desperately desires, even if it means challenging the prevailing animosity between humans and alkonosts.

== Reception ==
Reviewers often discussed Anderson's writing style. On behalf of The Bulletin of the Center for Children's Books, April Spisak highlighted the " lush descriptions of the island, the joyful moments of secret magic, and the memorable array of creatures". Kirkus Reviews called the novel "impressively different and captivating" and wrote, "Anderson delivers convincing, inviting worldbuilding, wide in scope, lovely in its evocation of landscapes, and entrancing in descriptions of foods, crafts, clothing, and feathers".

Many reviewers commented on Linnet's character. Spisak indicated that "Linnet's gleaming innocence and unwavering pure intentions make her a bit hard to connect with," though she said this is balanced by the "layers of nuance" in secondary characters. Conversely, Publishers Weekly highlighted how "Linnet’s hopeful first-person narration" allows Anderson "to flesh out imaginatively wrought beings and landscapes". Peter Hollindale, writing for The School Librarian, noted that, although Linnet is a late bloomer as far as magic goes, "her story shows that loyalty, bravery, and a warm heart are powerful magic in themselves".

Reviewers also highlighted the novel's key themes: "injustice, prejudice, and unity". Spisak wrote, "The book contemplates how bad actions can come out of good intentions, fearful choices, and complex feelings about what forms unity might take. While Linnet may be the one to spark peace, it will take all of them to sustain it." Kirkus Reviews highlighted how "Linnet’s determined hopefulness and strong spirit bolster her realization that love, not hatred or anger, will help heal the island", which "informs her actions and bold opposition to tyranny".

Booklist also reviewed the novel.

== Awards and honors ==
The Guardian named Thief Who Sang Storms one of the best children's books of 2022.
