= Eleanor Updale =

British author (born 1953)

- Born: 1953 (age 72–73)
- Education: St Anne's College, Oxford; Queen Mary, University of London
- Occupation: Writer
- Spouse: James Naughtie
- Children: 3
- Writing career
- Period: 2003–present
- Genres: Historical, mystery, suspense fiction; children's fiction
- Notable work: Montmorency series
- Website: eleanorupdale.co.uk

Eleanor Updale (born 1953) is an English fiction writer, best known for the Victorian-era children's book Montmorency (2003), and its sequels, which feature the namesake fictional character, Montmorency, a former convict turned gentleman.

== Personal life and education ==
Eleanor Updale was born in 1953 and grew up in Camberwell in south London. She studied history at St Anne's College, Oxford in the 1970s. She studied for an M.Res. degree at the Centre for Editing Lives and Letters at Queen Mary College, University of London in 2003. Her research into early members of the Royal Society was awarded a PhD in History by the university in 2007. She is also a trustee of the charity Listening Books.

Updale is married to broadcaster James Naughtie. The couple have three children.

== Career ==
Updale was a producer of television and radio current affairs programmes for the BBC, including The World at One and Newsnight, from 1975 to 1990. She was a member of the editorial advisory board of the journal Clinical Ethics, published by the Royal Society of Medicine.

Update wrote the Montmorency series of five young adult historical crime novels from 2003 to 2013. It features Montmorency, an English ex-convict turned gentleman detective and spy. In 2004 Montmorency won the Blue Peter award for ‘The Book I Couldn’t Put Down’. In 2012, Montmorency was dramatised by Free Range Productions for the Edinburgh Fringe.

Guardian reviewer Philip Ardagh described the Montmorency books as "rattling-good adventures [which] centre around the life of a Jekyll-and-Hyde thief who uses the sewers as an escape route".

== Novels ==
Updale's children's novel, Montmorency, was published in the UK by Scholastic Corporation in 2003 (and subsequently by its Orchard Books imprint in the U.S. under the title Montmorency: thief, liar, gentleman?). It was followed by four novels in the series.

- Montmorency on the Rocks: doctor, aristocrat, murderer? (2004)
- Montmorency and the Assassins: master, criminal, spy? (2005)
- Montmorency's Revenge: madman, actor, arsonist? (2006)
- Montmorency's Return (2013)

She has also written books with other characters:

- Itch, Scritch, Scratch, illustrated by Sarah Horne (Barrington Stoke, 2008)
- Saved (Barrington Stoke, 2008)
- Johnny Swanson (David Fickling Books, 2010)
- The Last Minute (David Fickling Books, 2013)
