= Laura Williams =

Laura Williams may refer to:

- Laura Williams (Big Brother), a contestant on Series 8 of Big Brother UK
- Laura Williams (footballer), English footballer who plays for Cardiff City Ladies F.C.
- Laura Williams (singer), cast member of The Lion King
- Laura J. Williams, female American Civil War soldier who disguised herself as a man and used the alias Lt. Henry Benford in order to raise and lead a company of Texas Confederates; she and the company participated in the Battle of Shiloh
- Laura Lynne Williams (1969–2018), Russian-American ecologist, founder of the Russian branch of the World Wide Fund for Nature and WWF office on Kamchatka
- Laura Williams Moore (née Williams; 1856–1919), wife of American architect and soldier Clement Clarke Moore
- Laura Mattan (née Williams; died 2008), wife of wrongly convicted Somali sailor Mahmood Hussein Mattan
- Laura Williams (politician), member of the Kansas House of Representatives

== See also ==
- Lara Williamson, Irish born children's author
