= James Naughtie =

British journalist (born 1951)

James Naughtie FRSE
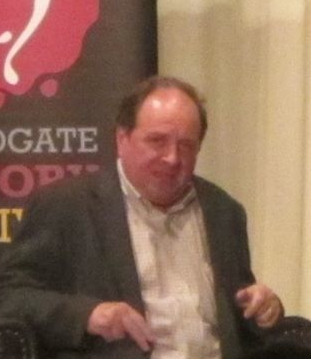
- Naughtie in 2015
- Born: Alexander James Naughtie; 9 August 1951 (age 75); Milltown of Rothiemay, Banffshire, Scotland
- Education: Keith Grammar School; University of Aberdeen; Syracuse University
- Spouse: Eleanor Updale
- Children: 3
- Parent(s): Alexander and Isabella
- Presenting career
- Show: Today programme
- Station: BBC Radio 4
- Network: BBC
- Show: Bookclub
- Station: BBC Radio 4
- Network: BBC
- Country: United Kingdom

Alexander James Naughtie FRSE (surname pronounced /ˈnɔːxti/; born 9 August 1951) is a British radio presenter and journalist, known for presenting on BBC Radio 4. From 1994 to 2015, he was one of the main presenters of the Today programme. In his 21 years on Today, Naughtie had anchored every BBC Radio UK election results programme from 1997 onwards. He also worked on every US presidential election from 1988 to 2012.

== Early life and career ==
James Naughtie was born to Alexander and Isabella Naughtie and brought up in Milltown of Rothiemay, near Huntly, Aberdeenshire, Scotland. He was educated at Keith Grammar School, the University of Aberdeen and then Syracuse University in New York.

Naughtie began his career as a journalist in 1975 at the Aberdeen Press & Journal, moving to the London offices of The Scotsman in 1977. The following year he joined the paper's Westminster staff, and became its Chief Political Correspondent. In 1981, he worked for The Washington Post as the Laurence Stern fellow on its national staff. He joined The Guardian in 1984, and became its Chief Political Correspondent in 1985.

He is a Fellow of the British-American Project, which endeavours to strengthen connections between the US and the UK.

== Radio presenter ==
In 1985, Naughtie moved into radio presenting, hosting The Week In Westminster before moving to The World At One in 1988. He has also made several radio documentaries and series and has written three books, Playing the Palace: A Westminster Collection, The Rivals: The Intimate Story of a Political Marriage, and The Accidental American: Tony Blair and the Presidency.

Naughtie has been a presenter of the televised Proms since 1992, and has also presented opera programmes such as Radio 3's Opera News. He is also the host of Radio 4's Bookclub.

In 1994 he became one of the main presenters of Radio 4's Today programme. Shortly before the 2005 General Election he opened a question to Labour politician Ed Balls "If we win the election...", quickly correcting himself to say "if you win the election". The incident led to accusations of bias towards the Labour Party and a failure to be neutral. Lord Tebbit said of the incident: "How often a slip of the tongue betrays the true thoughts in the mind of the speaker. We could all see the shape of the cat in the bag, but Mr Naughtie has now let it out for all to see." He has a distinctive Scottish accent which has been named as the "best voice to wake up to" in a comparative survey. His practice of asking particularly long questions is sometimes noted by commentators.

Throughout June, July and August 2012, and in early September 2012, he presented The New Elizabethans on Radio Four, a programme about notable people under the reign of Queen Elizabeth II, to mark the Diamond Jubilee of Elizabeth II. It has dealt with various famous names, including Richard Doll, Philip Larkin, Elizabeth David, Margot Fonteyn, Peter Hall, Cicely Saunders, John Lennon and Paul McCartney and Tim Berners-Lee. The final week of the programme dealt with Tony Blair, Fred Goodwin, Rupert Murdoch, Simon Cowell and finished with the Queen herself.

On 16 July 2013, it was announced that Naughtie's presentational role on Today would be temporarily reduced, as he was to become a presenter of Good Morning Scotland for two days a week in the run up the Scottish independence referendum in 2014. He returned to his usual role on Today in time for the 2015 general election.

In July 2015 he announced, via the BBC, that in early 2016 he would retire from regular presenting duties on the programme and would, instead, be its 'Special Correspondent' with 'responsibility for charting the course of the constitutional changes at the heart of the UK political debate', as well as the BBC News's Books Editor, contributing a book review to the Saturday morning editions of Today. "After 21 years, I can turn off that 3am alarm at last," the Daily Telegraph quoted Naughtie as saying. He presented his last edition of Today on 16 December 2015.

His work with BBC News continues as an occasional presenter of Radio Four's "The World This Weekend".

In 2016–17, Naughtie earned £150,000 – £199,999 as a BBC contributor. In 2018–19, his BBC earnings were in the £170,000 – £174,999 band.

In 2024, James Naughtie made an appearance as himself on ITV's drama, Mr Bates vs the Post Office.

=== Jeremy Hunt gaffe ===
On 6 December 2010, Naughtie was co-presenting the Today programme, and trailing the guests who would be interviewed after the 8 am news bulletin. Introducing Jeremy Hunt, the Culture Secretary, he inadvertently replaced the "H" at the beginning of "Hunt" with a "C". Choking on his words, he was clearly embarrassed by the mistake, and gave a full apology once he had recovered. However, only an hour later, another BBC presenter, Andrew Marr, made the same mistake when discussing Naughtie's error.

== Awards and positions ==
Naughtie was named as journalist of the year at the 1984 Scottish Press Awards. He was voted Sony Radio Awards Radio Personality of the Year in 1991 and Voice of the Listener & Viewer Award in 2001. He is a member of the Marshall Aid Commemoration Commission and a United Kingdom advisory board member for the British-American Project, which exists to promote the British-American relationship.

Naughtie was given an honorary doctorate by the University of Stirling in 2001, and installed as its Chancellor on 9 October 2008, succeeding Dame Diana Rigg when her ten-year term ended.

Naughtie chaired the judges of the inaugural 2010 Hippocrates Prize for Poetry and Medicine.

In 2017 Naughtie gave the Hugh Cudlipp Lecture. In his speech he referred to the Trump presidency thus: "There hasn't been in living memory in western democracy a threat to freedom of the press of the kind we see there."

Naughtie was elected a Fellow of the Royal Society of Edinburgh in March 2017.

== Personal life ==
Naughtie is married to Eleanor Updale, author of the Montmorency series of books and a former producer of The World at One. They have three children, and live in London and Edinburgh.

== Works ==
- Naughtie, James (2001) The Rivals: The Intimate Story of a Political Marriage, Fourth Estate, ISBN 1-84115-473-3
- Naughtie, James (2004) The Accidental American: Tony Blair and the Presidency, Macmillan, ISBN 1-4050-5001-2
- Naughtie, James (2007) The Making of Music, John Murray, ISBN 0-7195-6254-6
- Naughtie, James (2012) The New Elizabethans, Collins, ISBN 0-0074-8650-2
- Naughtie, James (2014) The Madness of July, Head of Zeus, ISBN 978-1-7818-5599-7
- Naughtie, James (2016) Paris Spring, Head of Zeus, ISBN 978-1-7840-8021-1
- Naughtie, James (2021) On The Road Adventures from Nixon to Trump, Simon & Schuster, ISBN 978-1-4711-7744-6

Media offices
Preceded by Brian Redhead	Presenter of Today Programme; 1994–2015	Succeeded by Nick Robinson
Preceded by Robin Day	Main presenter: The World at One; 1988–1994	Succeeded by Nick Clarke
