= Into the Woods (novel) =

2006 children's fantasy novel by Lyn Gardner

- First edition
- Author: Lyn Gardner
- Illustrator: Mini Grey
- Language: English
- Genre: Children's novel, fantasy novel
- Publisher: David Fickling Books
- Publication date: 1 January 2006
- Media type: Print
- ISBN: 9780385751155 Hardcover
- Followed by: Out of the Woods

Into the Woods is a 2006 children's fantasy novel by Lyn Gardner illustrated by Mini Grey.

== Reception ==
Into the Woods received a starred review from Kirkus Reviews who said the novel is "bursting with flavor and good humor" and concluded that "this single long, lovely fairy tale bows to an abundance of classic tales while keeping everything fresh." The Guardian's Kathryn Hughes similarly stated, "Gardner's funky retelling of virtually every fairytale you can remember doesn't just borrow from Perrault and the Grimms but even, cheekily, inhabits Angela Carter's now-classic re-tellings. Add in references to Shrek, Narnia and even Touching the Void, and you have the kind of glorious mish-mash of ancient and modern that is sometimes achieved by a very good pantomime."

Publishers Weekly concluded, "Gardner has crafted a fast-paced and entertaining adventure filled with cheeky humor and wordplay; even if the book's playful tone precludes the possibility of a dread ending, it's a blast of a journey."

The Guardian's Hughes called Grey's illustrations "sly and clever." Also writing for The Guardian, The Fantastical Reader said the illustrations "are absolutely brilliant and some ... are so realistic that you don't expect to feel the paper under your fingertips."
