= Superkoora =

Superkoora.com
- Company type: Private
- Industry: Internet, Website, Statistics Portal
- Founded: 2007; 19 years ago
- Founder: Abdulaziz Abuhamar
- Headquarters: Cairo, Egypt
- Area served: Middle East and worldwide
- Website: http://www.superkoora.com

Superkoora (Arabic: سوبر كورة) is a pan-Arab internet-based sports statistics portal that proved to be the most searched website in Google's 2008 Zeitgeist or annual report from Egypt. Superkoora was also the very first Arab website ever listed by Google. It is the largest statistics portal of its kind in the region and is fast becoming a sought-after data and information source for sport media.

== History ==
The online statistics portal was launched in August 2007 with the web domain superkoora.com providing sports results and statistics from all over the world.

== Statistics ==
Superkoora.com contains regional and international football data and information not available on any other website. This free and accurate information includes: comparisons, data and figures on players, clubs, coaches and matches. The site also contains a unique list of historic goal scorers for all FIFA World Cups. As a result, it is often utilized or its data by large media organizations including Al Jazeera Sport. Superkoora2022.com is the newest site launched ahead of the FIFA World Cup Qatar 2022 to cover sport in that country and has been referred to by, among others, the most popular newspaper in the Arab World, London-based Asharq Al-Awsat. Contributors to Superkoora's English site include author and former BBC sports reporter, Keir Radnedge, Steph Clark, sports journalist and blogger, Ben Lyttleton and Will Scott. Superkoora was appointed the official media partner of the 2011 Golden Foot Award in Monaco.

== Founder ==
Egypt-born, Abdelaziz Younis Abuhamar is the founder of superkoora.com. He is a bilingual journalist with 20 years of experience in the field of sports media.
