= Simon Chapman =

Simon Chapman may refer to:

- Simon Chapman (academic) (born 1951), Australian academic and anti-smoking activist
- Simon Chapman (author) (born 1965), British children's author
