= Sophie Anderson (author) =

Welsh author

- Born: Swansea, Wales
- Notable works: The House With Chicken Legs; The Girl Who Speaks Bear; The Castle Of Tangled Magic; The Thief Who Sang Storms
- Notable awards: Indie Book Award (2020)

Website
- sophieandersonauthor.com

Sophie Anderson is a Welsh author. Among other honours, her books have been shortlisted for the Carnegie Medal three times.

== Biography ==
Anderson was born and raised in Swansea. She attended the University of Liverpool. She is married and has four children. They live in the Lake District.

== Awards and honors ==
The House With Chicken Legs is a Junior Library Guild selection. Both Kirkus Reviews and The Guardian named it one of the best children's books of 2018. Waterstones also named it the Children's Book of the Month for May 2018.

In 2019, The Guardian and The Times named The Girl Who Speaks Bear one of the best children's books of the year.The Bulletin of the Center for Children's Books also named it one of the best children's books of 2020.

In 2020, The Times and the Wales Arts Review named The Castle Of Tangled Magic one of the best children's books of the year. The School Librarian also included it on their August 2021 list of the "Best New Books for Gifted and Talented Readers".

In 2022, The Guardian named The Thief Who Sang Storms one of the year's best children's books.

Awards for Anderson's writing
Year	Title	Award	Result	Ref.
2018	The House With Chicken Legs	First Book Award (Edinburgh International Book Festival)	Nominee	
2019	The House With Chicken Legs	Blue Peter Book Award for Best Story	Shortlist	
2019	The House With Chicken Legs	Branford Boase Award	Shortlist	
2019	The House With Chicken Legs	British Book Award for Children's Fiction Book of the Year	Shortlist	
2019	The House With Chicken Legs	Carnegie Medal	Shortlist	
2019	The House With Chicken Legs	Waterstones Children's Book Prize	Shortlist	
2021	The Girl Who Speaks Bear	Carnegie Medal	Shortlist	
2021	The Girl Who Speaks Bear	Indie Book Award for Children's Fiction	Winner	

== Publications ==
- The House With Chicken Legs. Illustrated by Elisa Paganelli. Usborne Publishing. 2018. ISBN 9781474940665.
- The Girl Who Speaks Bear. Illustrated by Kathrin Honesta. Scholastic Press. 2019.
- The Castle of Tangled Magic. Illustrated by Saara Soderlund. Usborne Publishing. 2020. ISBN 9781474978491.
- The Thief Who Sang Storms. Usborne Publishing. 2022. ISBN 9781474979061.
- The Snow Girl. Illustrated by Melissa Castrillón. Usborne Publishing. 2023.
- The House with Chicken Legs Runs Away. Illustrated by Melissa Castrillón. Usborne Publishing. 2026.
