= Anthony Lewis (illustrator) =

British illustrator of children's books (born 1966)

Anthony Lewis (born 8 December 1966) is a British illustrator of children's books. His work includes The Owl Tree by Jenny Nimmo, which won the 2004 Nestlé Smarties Book Prize in the 6– to 8-year-old readers category, and Atticus the Storyteller's 100 Greek Myths by Lucy Coats, which was shortlisted for the 2004 Blue Peter Book Awards, Best Illustrated Book to Read Aloud.

Anthony Lewis lives in Manley, Cheshire with his two daughters and son.
