= Man on the Moon (book) =

- First edition cover
- Author: Simon Bartram
- Illustrator: Simon Bartram
- Language: English
- Genre: Children's
- Publisher: Templar Publishing
- Publication date: 1 August 2002
- Publication place: United Kingdom
- Pages: 32
- ISBN: 978-1-84011-445-4
- OCLC: 50099648

Man on the Moon is a children's book by Simon Bartram, published in 2002. It was chosen as the Blue Peter Book of the Year after it was reprinted in paperback in 2004.
