= The Castle of Tangled Magic =

2020 middle-grade fantasy novel by Sophie Anderson

- Author: Sophie Anderson
- Illustrator: Saara Soderlund
- Genre: Middle grade fiction, fantasy
- Publisher: Usborne Publishing
- Publication date: October 1, 2020
- ISBN: 9781474978491
- OCLC: 1229125317

The Castle of Tangled Magic is a 2020 middle grade fantasy novel by Sophie Anderson, illustrated by Saara Soderlund. The story follows 13-year-old Olia as she journeys into a magical land to save her family and home.

== Plot ==
The Castle of Tangled Magic centers around Olia, a 13-year-old girl residing with her family in Castle Mila, a whimsical and weathered wooden castle with a rich history spanning 500 years. Although her family has transitioned from royalty to carpentry, Olia holds a deep affection for the castle. However, her world takes a dramatic turn when a storm threatens to destroy the castle. During this crisis, Olia discovers that the castle harbors an abundance of magic that is yearning to break free. To safeguard her family and their beloved home, Olia embarks on a perilous journey alongside Feliks, the castle's fox-like domovoi. Together, they venture into the Land of Forbidden Magic, where they must cut off an evil wizard's beard to restore the equilibrium of magic.

Throughout her adventure, Olia encounters a diverse array of magical beings drawn from Slavic folklore. In this enchanted realm, she learns that appearances can be deceiving, and that mysteries abound at every turn.

== Reception ==
In a starred review, Publishers Weekly wrote, "Anderson [...] writes an intimately cadenced adventure, rendering the magically charged setting a character of its own while emphasizing themes of perspective, family legacy, and following one's gut".

Alison Brumwell, writing for The School Librarian, called Anderson "talented" and highlighted how she "brings a freshness to this memorable coming of age tale about defeating self-doubt and embracing family". Brumwell also praised Söderlund's "sumptuous cover and animated illustrations".

Kirkus Reviews provided a mixed review, noting that "largely unanswered worldbuilding questions [..] may leave readers feeling that key aspects of the plot are underdeveloped and contrived." They added, "The dialogue sometimes feels self-conscious, but Olia's first-person narration is earnest, and readers will root for her".

Booklist also reviewed The Castle Of Tangled Magic.

== Awards and honors ==
The Castle of Tangled Magic was named one of the best books of 2020 by Waterstones, The Sunday Times, The Times, and the Wales Arts Review. The School Librarian also included it on their August 2021 list of the "Best New Books for Gifted and Talented Readers".
