= Ali Sparkes =

British children's author (born 1966)

- Born: 1966 (age 59–60); Southampton, England
- Occupation: Author
- Writing career
- Notable works: Frozen in Time (2009); Car-Jacked (2015)
- Website: alisparkes.com

Alison Sparkes (born 1966) is a British children's author. She is best known for her Shapeshifter book series.

== Career ==
Sparkes previously worked as a journalist for the Southern Daily Echo and for BBC Radio Solent before focusing on writing children's books.

She published her first book, Finding the Fox, with Oxford University Press in 2006. It became the first of the six-book Shapeshifter series. Later, she published Out of this World, originally released as Miganium, as a prequel to The Shapeshifter. Her five-book Unleashed series serves as a spin-off/sequel to The Shapeshifter, centered on some of the other Shapeshifter characters.

Sparkes has published several books unrelated to The Shapeshifter series, including standalone novels, as well as the Monster Makers, Night Speakers, and S.W.I.T.C.H. series.

== Awards and honours ==
Awards for Sparkes's books
Year	Title	Award	Result	Ref.
2007	Finding the Fox	Bolton Children's Book Award	Nominee	
2010	Frozen in Time	Blue Peter Book of the Year Award	Winner	
2010	Frozen in Time	Blue Peter Book Award for "Book I Couldn't Put Down"	Winner	
2011	Wishful Thinking	Carnegie Medal	Nominee	
2017	Car-Jacked	Red House Children's Book Award	Nominee	

== Personal life ==
Sparkes is from Southampton and attended Bitterne Park School. She is married and has two sons.

== Publications ==
=== Standalone books ===
- Frozen In Time. Oxford University Press. January 2008. ISBN 978-0-192-72755-8.
- Dark Summer. Oxford University Press. January 2009. ISBN 978-0-192-71098-7.
- Wishful Thinking. Oxford University Press. January 2010. ISBN 978-0-192-75611-4.
- Freak of Fortune. Franklin Watt. January 2011. ISBN 978-1-445-10556-7.
- Out of This World. Oxford University Press. June 2013. ISBN 978-0-192-79412-3.
- Destination Earth. Oxford University Press. June 2014. ISBN 978-0-192-73344-3.
- Sparkes, Ali (August 2014). The Man in the Water. Illustrated by Nina Lazarski. TMITW. ISBN 978-0-956-39671-6.
- Car-Jacked. Oxford University Press. June 2015. ISBN 978-0-19-273346-7.
- Thunder Struck. Oxford University Press. March 2017. ISBN 978-0-19-273936-0.
- Death by Detention. Coven Publishing. July 2018. ISBN 978-0-956-39673-0.
- Sparkes, Ali (January 2020). The Great Pebble Puzzle. Illustrated by Chelen Ecija. Collins. ISBN 978-0-008-34040-7.
- My Sister is a Dog. Oxford University Press. March 2023. ISBN 978-1-913-43266-9.
- 100 Summers. Oxford University Press. January 2024. ISBN 978-1-913-43284-3.

=== Monster Makers ===
1. Electrotaur and Slashermite. Scholastic. February 2008. ISBN 978-1-407-10291-7.
2. Stinkermite. Scholastic. September 2009. ISBN 978-1-407-10293-1.

=== Night Speakers series (2018-2020) ===
1. Night Speakers. Oxford University Press. March 2018. ISBN 978-0-192-75000-6.
2. Night Raiders. Oxford University Press. September 2018. ISBN 978-0-192-74996-3.
3. Night Walker. Oxford University Press. April 2019. ISBN 978-0-192-74997-0.
4. Night Terrors. Oxford University Press. September 2019. ISBN 978-0-192-74998-7.
5. Night Forever. Oxford University Press. January 2020. ISBN 978-0-192-74999-4.

=== The Shapeshifter series (2006-2026) ===
The Shapeshifter series follows the life of a boy named Dax Jones and is primarily set in England, firstly in the Cornwall area and later in the Lake District. During the first book, Finding the Fox, Dax discovers his ability to shapeshift into a fox, and is whisked away from his hated stepfamily by the government. Dax is one of a number of COLAs (Children of Limitless Ability), young people who possess amazing supernatural powers. Some of his classmates are able to heal, move objects with their mind, communicate with the dead, or see into the future. These children attend a school called Tregarren College in Cornwall, which is later destroyed by a tidal wave, and the children move to Fenton Lodge, in the Lake District.

1. Finding The Fox. Oxford University Press. January 2006. ISBN 978-0-192-75465-3.
2. Running The Risk. Oxford University Press. January 2007. ISBN 978-0-192-75466-0.
3. Going To Ground. Oxford University Press. January 2007. ISBN 978-0-192-75467-7.
4. Dowsing The Dead. Oxford University Press. January 2007. ISBN 978-0-192-75468-4.
5. Stirring The Storm. Oxford University Press. January 2008. ISBN 978-0-192-75469-1.
6. Feather And Fang. Oxford University Press. May 2016. ISBN 978-0-192-74605-4.
7. Settling The Score. May 2026.

=== S.W.I.T.C.H. series (2011-2012) ===
The Switch books are illustrated by Ross Collins.

1. Spider Stampede. Oxford University Press. January 2011. ISBN 978-1-4677-0710-7.
2. Fly Frenzy. Oxford University Press. May 2013. ISBN 978-1-4677-0711-4.
3. Grasshopper Glitch. Oxford University Press. January 2011. ISBN 978-0-192-72934-7.
4. Ant Attack. Oxford University Press. May 2011. ISBN 978-0-192-72935-4.
5. Crane Fly Crash. Oxford University Press. December 2012. ISBN 978-0-192-72936-1.
6. Beetle Blast. Oxford University Press. December 2012. ISBN 978-0-192-72937-8.
7. Lizard Loopy. Oxford University Press. February 2012. ISBN 978-0-192-73236-1.
8. Chameleon Chaos. Oxford University Press. February 2012. ISBN 978-0-192-73237-8.
9. Turtle Terror. Oxford University Press. February 2012. ISBN 978-0-192-73238-5.
10. Gecko Gladiator. Oxford University Press. February 2012. ISBN 978-0-192-73239-2.
11. Anaconda Adventure. Oxford University Press. March 2012. ISBN 978-0-192-73240-8.
12. Alligator Action. Oxford University Press. March 2012. ISBN 978-0-192-73241-5.
13. Frog Freak Out!. Oxford University Press. April 2014. ISBN 978-1-4677-2111-0.
14. Newt Nemesis. Darby Creek. January 2014. ISBN 978-1-467-73233-8.

=== Unleashed series (2011-2014) ===
1. A Life And Death Job. Oxford University Press. January 2011. ISBN 978-0-192-75606-0.
2. Mind Over Matter. Oxford University Press. December 2011. ISBN 978-0-192-75607-7.
3. Trick Or Truth. Oxford University Press. May 2012. ISBN 978-0-192-75608-4.
4. Speak Evil. Oxford University Press. May 2013. ISBN 978-0-192-79327-0.
5. The Burning Beach. Oxford University Press. January 2014. ISBN 978-0-192-75610-7.
