= That Book ...of Perfectly Useless Information =

- First edition
- Author: Mitchell Symons
- Original title: That Book
- Language: English
- Subject: Useless information, Trivia, Humour
- Genre: non-fiction
- Publisher: Bantam Press 2003 (UK); William Morrow 2004 (US)
- Publication place: United States - original version British
- Media type: Print (Hardback & Paperback)
- Pages: 371 p. (US hardback edition)
- ISBN: 0-06-073149-4 (US hardback edition)
- OCLC: 54953153
- Dewey Decimal: 031.02 22
- LC Class: AG106 .S94 2004
- Followed by: This Book ...of More Perfectly Useless Information

That Book ...of Perfectly Useless Information, commonly abbreviated as "That Book" (the title it was published under in Britain) is a book written by writer Mitchell Symons, and published in 2003.

== Book Trivia ==
=== Material ===
The book covers all sorts of material, but frequent topics are celebrities and other people, and their personal qualities, animals, calendar dates, years, toilets, songs, bands, and information normally in the form of lists.

=== Collection ===
In the acknowledgements for the book, Symons says: "For the past twenty years, I've been collecting weird and wonderful facts, which I've been storing on bits of paper and, more recently, on my computer. Every few years I'll use some of it in a book or a newspaper series, but it's always been my ambition to be able to put together the most fascinating, extraordinary facts I had-or could find-in one volume."
