= The Adventures of the Dish and the Spoon =

2006 picture book by Mini Grey

- Author: Mini Grey
- Illustrator: Mini Grey
- Cover artist: Grey
- Language: English
- Genre: Children's picture book
- Publisher: Jonathan Cape
- Publication date: 6 April 2006
- Publication place: United Kingdom
- Pages: 32 pp
- ISBN: 978-0-224-07037-9
- OCLC: 62796100
- LC Class: PZ7.G873 Ad 2006

The Adventures of the Dish and the Spoon is a children's picture book written and illustrated by Mini Grey, published by Jonathan Cape in 2006. It won the annual Kate Greenaway Medal from the professional librarians, recognising the year's best-illustrated children's book published in the U.K. It was also bronze runner up for the Nestlé Smarties Book Prize in ages category 6–8 years.

The title alludes to "Hey Diddle Diddle", an English nursery rhyme whose last line is "And the Dish ran away with the Spoon". According to the British librarians, the story shows "what happens next in the astonishing tale of the dazzling Dish and Spoon duo, after they run away together". According to the U.S. national library summary, they "become vaudeville stars before turning to a life of crime."

The Adventure "falls neatly into the currently popular slot of post-modernist retellings", according to Julia Eccleshare, children's books editor for The Guardian newspaper. Commenting on the 2007 CILIP awards, she concluded, "Filmic in feel, and full of cinematic references, it unfolds beautifully with loads of visual jokes for children and adults alike."

In the U.S., it was published within the calendar year by the Random House imprint Alfred A. Knopf. It was adapted as a musical by Bert Bernardi (writer and lyricist) and Scott Simonelli (composer) and staged in 2009 at the Downtown Cabaret Children's Theatre in Bridgeport, Connecticut.

== See also ==
- Category: Nursery rhymes
