= Adam Frost (writer) =

British author (born 1972)

- Born: Adam Frost; 21 August 1972 (age 54); Epping
- Occupation: Author
- Writing career
- Period: 2005-present
- Notable works: Ralph the Magic Rabbit (2005), The Epic Book of Epicness (2015), The Awesome Book of Space (2018)
- Website: adam-frost.com

Adam Frost (born 21 August 1972) is a British author, best known for his children's books Ralph the Magic Rabbit (shortlisted for the Waterstones Children's Book Prize), The Epic Book of Epicness (winner of the Blue Peter Book Award) and The Awesome Book of Space (winner of the Sainsbury's Children's Book Award from BookTrust). He also designs information graphics for The Guardian, and teaches and writes on the subject.

== Early life ==
Adam Frost was born in Epping and grew up in Buckhurst Hill, Essex. He attended Buckhurst Hill County High School. He earned a BA in English Literature from the University of Oxford and a PhD from the University of Cambridge. His dissertation was on the short stories of H.H. Munro (‘Saki’).

== Career ==
Frost published his first book Ralph the Magic Rabbit in 2006. It was shortlisted for the Waterstones Children's Book Prize. His second book, Harry, Rabbit on the Run followed in 2008. The Danny Danger series appeared in 2011–12, focussing on an 8-year-old boy who possesses a remote control that can rewind, fast forward and pause time. A series of books for London Zoo, centring on a zookeeper and his family, appeared in 2012–13. His first non-fiction book, The Awesome Book of Awesomeness, was published by Bloomsbury in 2014. His second, The Epic Book of Epicness, followed in 2015 and won the 2016 Blue Peter Book Award for Best Book with Facts. The Fox Investigates series, centring on the exploits of a fox private eye, first appeared in 2015. A Brush with Danger, the first book in the series, was shortlisted for the Teach Primary Awards in 2016.

Frost also designs information graphics for The Guardian and other publications. His graphic with Zhenia Vasiliev, ‘The 39 Stats’, was awarded a Silver Medal in the 2013 Information is Beautiful Awards. Other graphics have focussed on the Gothic novel, entomophagy and the election of Pope Francis. His book on information design, Communicating with Data Visualisation, co-authored with Tobias Sturt, Jim Kynvin and Sergio Gallardo, appeared in December 2021.

== Books ==
=== Children's books ===
- Ralph the Magic Rabbit (Macmillan, 2006)
- Harry, Rabbit on the Run (Macmillan, 2008)
- Danny Danger and the Cosmic Remote (Nosy Crow, 2011)
- Danny Danger and the Space Twister (Nosy Crow, 2012)
- Stop! There’s a Snake in Your Suitcase (Bloomsbury, 2012)
- Run! The Elephant Weighs a Ton (Bloomsbury, 2012)
- Catch That Bat! (Bloomsbury, 2013)
- Hide! The Tiger’s Mouth is Open Wide! (Bloomsbury, 2013)
- The Awesome Book of Awesomeness (Bloomsbury, 2014)
- The Epic Book of Epicness (Bloomsbury, 2015)
- Fox Investigates: A Brush with Danger (Stripes/ Little Tiger, 2015)
- Fox Investigates: A Whiff of Mystery (Stripes/ Little Tiger, 2015)
- Fox Investigates: A Web of Lies (Stripes/ Little Tiger, 2016)
- The Awesome Body Book (Bloomsbury, 2016)
- Fox Investigates: A Taste for Adventure (Stripes/ Little Tiger, 2016)
- Fox Investigates: A Trail of Trickery (Stripes/ Little Tiger, 2016)
- Fox Investigates: A Dash of Poison (Stripes/ Little Tiger, 2017)
- The Book of Me! (Bloomsbury, 2017)
- The Awesome Book of Animals (Bloomsbury, 2017)
- Splat the Fake Fact! (Bloomsbury, 2018)
- The Awesome Book of Space (Bloomsbury, 2018)
- Utterly Unbelievable: Second World War (Puffin, 2019)
- Dinos Love Numbers: Maths is Easy with Dinosaurs (Hachette, 2023)
- Sharks Love Science: Science is Fun under the sea (Hachette, 2024)

=== Other books ===
- Communicating with Data Visualisation (Sage, 2021)
