= Mini Grey =

British children's illustrator and writer

Mini Grey is a British illustrator and writer of children's books, especially picture books for young children. She won the annual Kate Greenaway Medal from the professional librarians, recognising the year's best-illustrated children's book published in the UK, for The Adventures of the Dish and the Spoon, published by Jonathan Cape in 2006.

WorldCat reports from participating libraries that her most widely held work is Traction Man is Here, about the household adventures of a boy's action figure; published in 2005 by Cape and in the US by Random House (Alfred A. Knopf).

== Life ==
Mini Grey was born in a Mini car in Newport, a city in southern Wales. She uses only her nickname, after the automobile model. She was raised in Taplow, Buckinghamshire, England. After working in theatre, Grey pursued a Master of Arts (MA) in Sequential Design and Illustration at the University of Brighton.

As of 2025 she lives in Oxford with her partner Tony and her adult son.

== Career ==
As a professional school project, Grey created a pop-up version of Gulliver's Travels.

- Egg Drop (Cape, 2002; Knopf, 2009) – Egg Drop at WorldCat

"... Presents the story of the Egg that wanted to fly."
"The egg has always dreamed of being able to fly, but it doesn't really know much about making the dream a reality. The only method that seems guaranteed to work is to get to a very high place and then jump. Not a good idea for an egg."
inspired by Humpty Dumpty

- The Pea and the Princess (Cape, 2003); US title, The Very Smart Pea and the Princess-to-be (Knopf, 2003)

'Once upon a time there was an enchanting fairytale about a prince who was looking for a real princess to be his bride. This is a reworking of the classic fairytale told from the point of view of the pea.' --The Princess and the Pea in libraries (WorldCat catalog)
'The pea gives its own version of what happened in the fairy tale, "The Princess and the Pea", from the time of its birth in the Palace Garden until it helps arrange a royal marriage.' --The very smart pea ... in libraries (WorldCat catalog), first US edition

- Biscuit Bear (Cape, 2004); US title, Ginger Bear (Knopf, 2007) – Biscuit Bear/ Ginger Bear at WorldCat
- Traction Man
  - Traction Man is Here (2005)
  - Traction Man Meets Turbo Dog (2008)
  - Traction Man and the Beach Odyssey (Cape, 2011; Knopf, 2012)

adventures of Traction Man, a boy's action figures, and his sidekick Scrubbing Brush

The Adventures of the Dish and the Spoon (2006; Cape, Knopf) – The Adventures at WorldCat

== Works ==
=== As author and illustrator ===
All these books have been published by Jonathan Cape in the UK and by the Random House imprint Alfred A. Knopf in the US Where one date is given, the American edition appeared in the same calendar year.

- Egg Drop (2002; US 2009)
- The Pea and the Princess (2003); US title, The Very Smart Pea and the Princess-to-be
- Biscuit Bear (2004); US title, Ginger Bear (2007)
- Traction Man is Here (2005)
- The Adventures of the Dish and the Spoon (2006)
- Traction Man Meets Turbo Dog (2008)
- Three by the Sea (2010)
- Traction Man and the Beach Odyssey (2011; 2012)
- Toys in Space (US edition: Alfred A. Knopf, 2013)
- Hermelin: The Detective Mouse (2015)
- Space Dog (2015)
- The Bad Bunnies' Magic Show (2017)
- The Last Wolf (2019)
- The Greatest Show on Earth (2022)

=== As illustrator ===
- The Crocodile is Coming! (2005)
- Into the Woods (2006), by Lyn Gardner —400-page fantasy novel
- The Twin Giants (2007), by Dick King-Smith —a picture book
- Jim, Who Ran Away from His Nurse, and Was Eaten by a Lion (2009)

—movable book edition of the poem by Hilaire Belloc (1870–1953)

- Out of the Woods (2010), by Lyn Gardner —350-page sequel to Into the Woods
- Pippi Longstocking (2020), by Astrid Lindgren
- Pippi Longstocking in the South Seas (2020), by Astrid Lindgren
- Pippi Longstocking Goes Aboard (2020), by Astrid Lindgren
- Emil and the Sneaky Rat (2020), by Astrid Lindgren
- Emil's Clever Pig (2020), by Astrid Lindgren
- The Book of Not Entirely Useful Advice (2020), by A.F. Harrold
- Lotta Makes a Mess (2020), by Astrid Lindgren
- Lotta Says 'No!' (2020), by Astrid Lindgren
- Karlsson on the Roof (2021), by Astrid Lindgren
- Karlsson Flies Again (2021), by Astrid Lindgren
- The Children of Noisy Village (2021), by Astrid Lindgren
- Nothing but Fun in Noisy Village (2021), by Astrid Lindgren
- Happy Times in Noisy Village (2021), by Astrid Lindgren
- Money-Go-Round (2021), by Roger McGough

== Awards and recognitions ==
Awards

Grey has won three annual book awards.

- 2004 Biscuit Bear won the Nestlé Smarties Book Prize, ages category 6–8 years.
- 2005 Traction Man is Here won the Boston Globe-Horn Book Award, Picture Book.
- 2007 The Adventures of the Dish and the Spoon won the Kate Greenaway Medal.

Runners-up, etc.

- 2003 The Pea and the Princess made the Greenaway Medal shortlist.
- 2005 Biscuit Bear made the Blue Peter Book Award shortlist.
- Traction Man is Here made the 2005 Greenaway shortlist, the 2006 Blue Peter shortlist, and the 2007 Hampshire Illustrated Book Award shortlist.
- 2006 The Adventures of the Dish and the Spoon was bronze runner up for the Smarties Prize, ages 0–5 years.
- 2011 Jim, Who Ran Away from His Nurse, and Was Eaten by a Lion made the Greenaway shortlist.
