= Polly Ho-Yen =

English author

- Born: Northampton, England
- Occupation: Author
- Website: https://www.pollyhoyen.com/

Polly Ho-Yen is an English author.

== Biography ==
Ho-Yen was born in Northampton and grew up in Buckinghamshire. She studied English at the University of Birmingham and worked both in publishing and as a primary school teacher.

Her debut novel, The Boy In The Tower (2014), was shortlisted for the Blue Peter Book Award, the Federation of Children's Book Groups Book Award and the Waterstones Children's Book Prize.

Her first adult novel, Dark Lullaby, was published in 2021.

Ho-Yen is based in Bristol, where she set up the Bristol Teen Book Award for Bristol secondary schools.

== Published works ==
=== For Children ===
Title	Year
The Boy In The Tower	2014
Where Monsters Lie	2016
Fly Me Home	2017
Two Sides (Illustrated by Binny Talib)	2019
My Other Life	2020
How I Saved The World In A Week	2021
The Boy Who Grew a Tree	2022
The Day No One Woke Up	2022
The Last Dragon	2024

=== Short stories ===
Title	Year	Publisher	From
The theater of dreams	2023	Farshore	Read, Scream, Repeat Various Authors (Compiled by Jennifer Killick)

=== For adults ===
Title	Year
Dark Lullaby	2021
