= The House with Chicken Legs =

2018 middle-grade fantasy novel by Sophie Anderson

- Author: Sophie Anderson
- Illustrator: Elisa Paganelli
- Genre: Middle grade fiction, fantasy
- Publisher: Usborne Publishing
- Publication date: April 5, 2018
- ISBN: 9781474940665

The House with Chicken Legs is a 2018 middle-grade fantasy novel by Sophie Anderson, illustrated by Elisa Paganelli. Inspired by traditional Baba Yaga tales, the novel follows a young girl, Marinka, who lives with her grandmother in a magical, sentient house, traveling the world while her grandmother helps support and guide newly deceased people to the afterlife.

== Plot ==
The House with Chicken Legs follows Marinka, who has grown up with her grandmother, Baba, in a magical, sentient house that roams the world, settling in new, remote places. Every night, Baba cares for the spirits of people who have recently died, offering the spirits food and comfort before guiding them into the afterlife with a blessing. Such is the life of a yaga.

Marinka dreads her fate of one day becoming a yaga. For now, though, her job is to build a protective wall of bones around their house when it settles, ensuring that the living cannot enter. However, Marinka longs for companionship and wishes for a life without walls so she can make a friend. When a recently deceased girl arrives at their house, Marinka delays her passage to the afterlife, nearly jeopardizing it. In the end, her grandmother has to accompany the girl to ensure her safe journey, and to Marinka's shock, Baba Yaga doesn't return.

Determined to rescue her grandmother, Marinka devises a plan to bring her back, but this decision leads to a series of unfortunate events and mishaps.

== Reception ==
The House with Chicken Legs was well-received by critics, including starred reviews from Kirkus Reviews and School Library Journal.

Kirkus called the novel "heartbreaking, uplifting, and absolutely beautiful".

School Library Journal's Jane Miller said the novel is "a thoughtfully crafted, macabre masterpiece for middle grade readers" that "also has the read-aloud appeal of a beloved folk or fairy tale". Miller called Marinka "a plucky, compassionate heroine" who "is completely relatable as she struggles with the desire for independence while knowing she has much to learn from her elders, peers, pets, and, surprisingly, her dwelling".

The School Librarian's Mary Medlicott highlighted the character of the house, saying it "is in many ways the most engaging feature of this fascinating story. Yes, it has chicken legs as in the folklore. But it also can–and does–run off sometimes, taking Baba Yaga and Marinka with it. [...] In every way, it's a fabulous invention which gives yet more delight to this story".

Karen Coats, writing for The Bulletin of the Center for Children's Books, provided a mixed review, noting that "Marinka's yearnings are relentlessly one-note". Despite this, Coats wrote, "Marinka's lies and errors in judgment have natural consequences that evoke both suspense and empathy. The innovations on the Yaga figures render them necessary and sympathetic rather than terrifying".

The Times also reviewed the novel.

== Awards and honors ==
The House with Chicken Legs is a Junior Library Guild book. Both Kirkus Reviews and The Guardian named it one of the best children's books of 2018. Waterstones also named it the Children's Book of the Month for May 2018.

Awards for The House with Chicken Legs
Year	Award	Result	Ref.
2018	First Book Award (Edinburgh International Book Festival)	Nominated	
2019	Blue Peter Book Award for Best Story	Shortlisted	
2019	Branford Boase Award	Shortlisted	
2019	British Book Award for Children's Fiction Book of the Year	Shortlisted	
2019	Carnegie Medal	Shortlisted	
2019	Waterstones Children's Book Prize	Shortlisted	

== Adaptations ==
Oliver Lansley adapted and co-directed a theatrical version of The House with Chicken Legs, which was performed by Les Enfants Terribles. Lisa Howard played Baba, while Eve De Leon Allen played Marinka. David Fallon was cast in the role of Geordie.

The Guardian's Nick Ahad highlighted how the play is "packed with fun, exuberant musical numbers, amusingly irreverent performances and inventive theatricality." However, Ahad noted, "The piece is overlong, with too much story and a running time that pushes towards three hours [...] It is at its best when it chooses irreverence over sincerity, although it is particularly strong when portraying the exquisite awkwardness of teenage life."
