= Mitchell Symons =

British journalist and writer (born 1957)

- Born: 11 February 1957 (age 69); London, England

Mitchell Symons (born 11 February 1957) is a British journalist and writer. Born in London, he was educated at Mill Hill School and the LSE where he studied law. Since leaving the BBC, where he was a researcher and director, he has worked as a writer, broadcaster and journalist. He was a principal writer for the early UK editions of the board game Trivial Pursuit, and has devised many television formats. He wrote an opinion column for the Daily Express, for which he was named If It's In the News Columnist of the Year in 2002.

== Awards ==
- 2010 Blue Peter Book Awards Best Book with Facts, Why Eating Bogeys Is Good For You
- 2011 Blue Peter Book Awards Best Book with Facts, Do Igloos Have Loos?

== Published books ==
=== Fiction ===
- All In
- The Lot
- No Red Light Shining

=== Non-fiction ===
- Why Girls Can't Throw (and Other Questions You Always Wanted Answered)
- That Book
- This Book of More Perfectly Useless Information
- The Other Book of the Most Perfectly Useless Information
- This, That and the Other (Compilation of That Book, This Book and the Other Book). Later re-released as The Ultimate Loo Book
- Forfeit!
- The Equation Book of Sports Crosswords
- The Equation Book of Movie Crosswords
- The You Magazine Book Of Journalists (four books, co-author)
- Movielists (co-author)
- The Sunday Magazine Book Of Crosswords
- The Hello! Magazine Book Of Crosswords (three books)
- How To Be Fat: The Chip and Fry Diet (co-author)
- The Book of Criminal Records
- The Book of Lists
- The Book of Celebrity Lists
- The Book of Celebrity Sex Lists
- National Lottery Big Draw 2000 (co-author)
- How to Avoid a Wombat's Bum
- The Sudoku Institute Book
- How To Speak Celebrity
- Where Do Nudists Keep Their Hankies?
- Why Eating Bogeys Is Good For You
- Don't Get Me Started: A Way-Beyond-Grumpy Rant About Modern Life
- How Much Poo Does An Elephant Do?
- Why Do Farts Smell Like Rotten Eggs?
- Why Does Ear Wax Taste So Gross?
- Mitchell Symons Diary 2010
- Why You Need A Passport When You're Going To Puke
- Do Igloos Have Loos?
- On Your Farts, Get Set, Go!
- Don't Wipe Your Bum With A Hedgehog
- The Book of Poker Calls (co-author)
- Desert Island Discs: Flotsam & Jetsam
- The Bumper Book For The Loo
- Why Spacemen Can't Burp
- Numberland
- Happily Never After: Modern Cautionary Tales
- Why Don't You Smell When You're Sleeping?
- There Are Tittles In This Title
- The World In Numbers Calendar 2017
- The World In Numbers Calendar 2018
- The YOU Magazine Book of General Knowledge Crosswords
