= Onjali Q. Raúf =

British author (born 1981)

Onjali Q. Raúf MBE
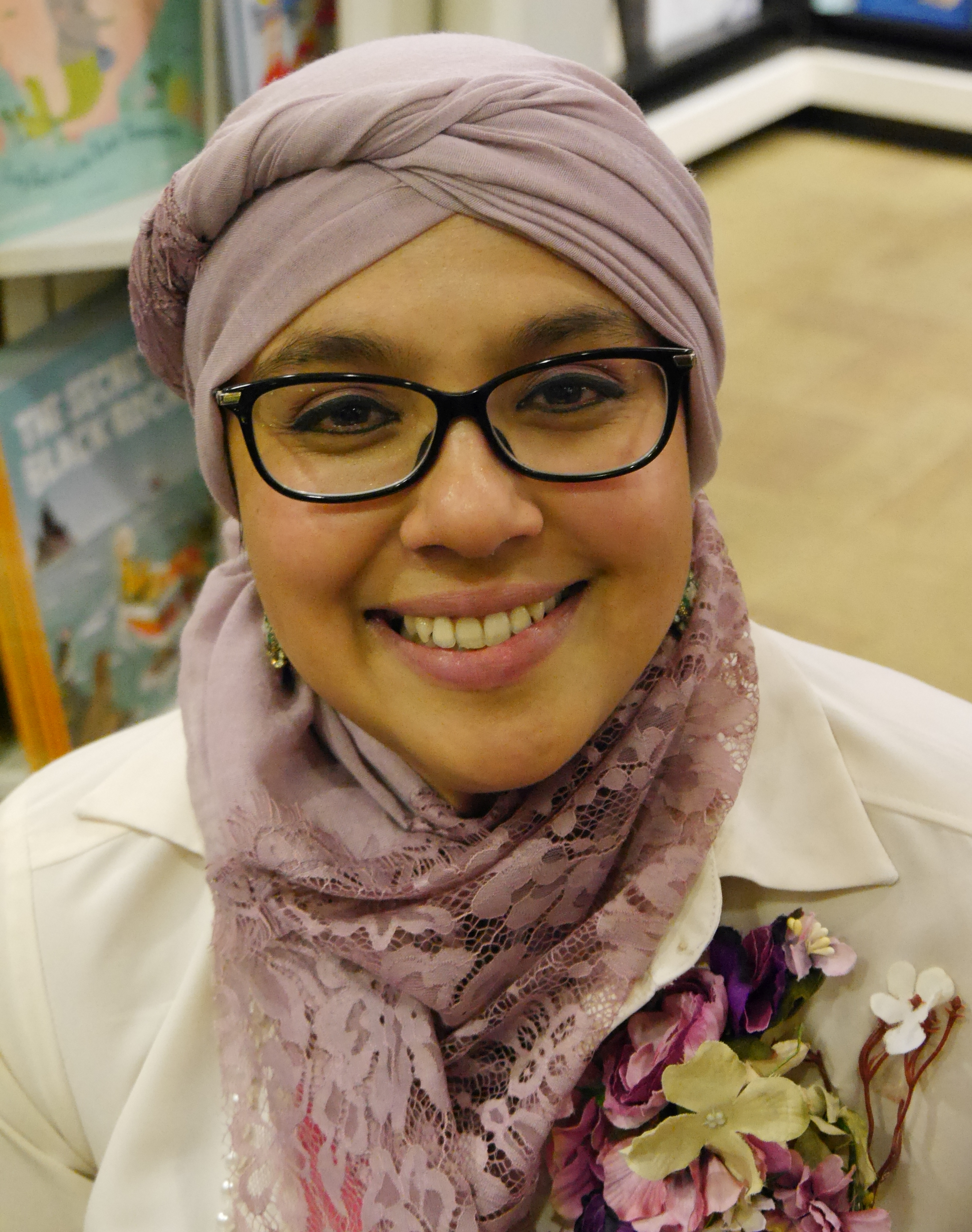
- Raúf in 2019
- Born: Onjali Qatara Raúf; February 1981 (age 45); Newcastle upon Tyne, England
- Education: Aberystwyth University (BA); University of Oxford (MSt)
- Occupations: Children's writer; activist
- Website: www.onjaliqrauf.org

Onjali Qatara Raúf MBE (born February 1981) is a British author and the founder of two NGOs: Making Herstory, a woman's rights organisation tackling the abuse and trafficking of women and girls in the UK; and O's Refugee Aid Team, which raises awareness and funds to support refugee frontline aid organisations.

== Background ==
Raúf is of British Bangladeshi heritage. Her work is informed in part by her experiences of racism in childhood. "When I started being called Paki, I started to feel [my difference]. I wondered: why is there no one who looks like me in the books? So I wanted to write those characters,” she said in a 2019 interview with The Guardian. Raúf was born in Newcastle and raised in London.

== Career ==
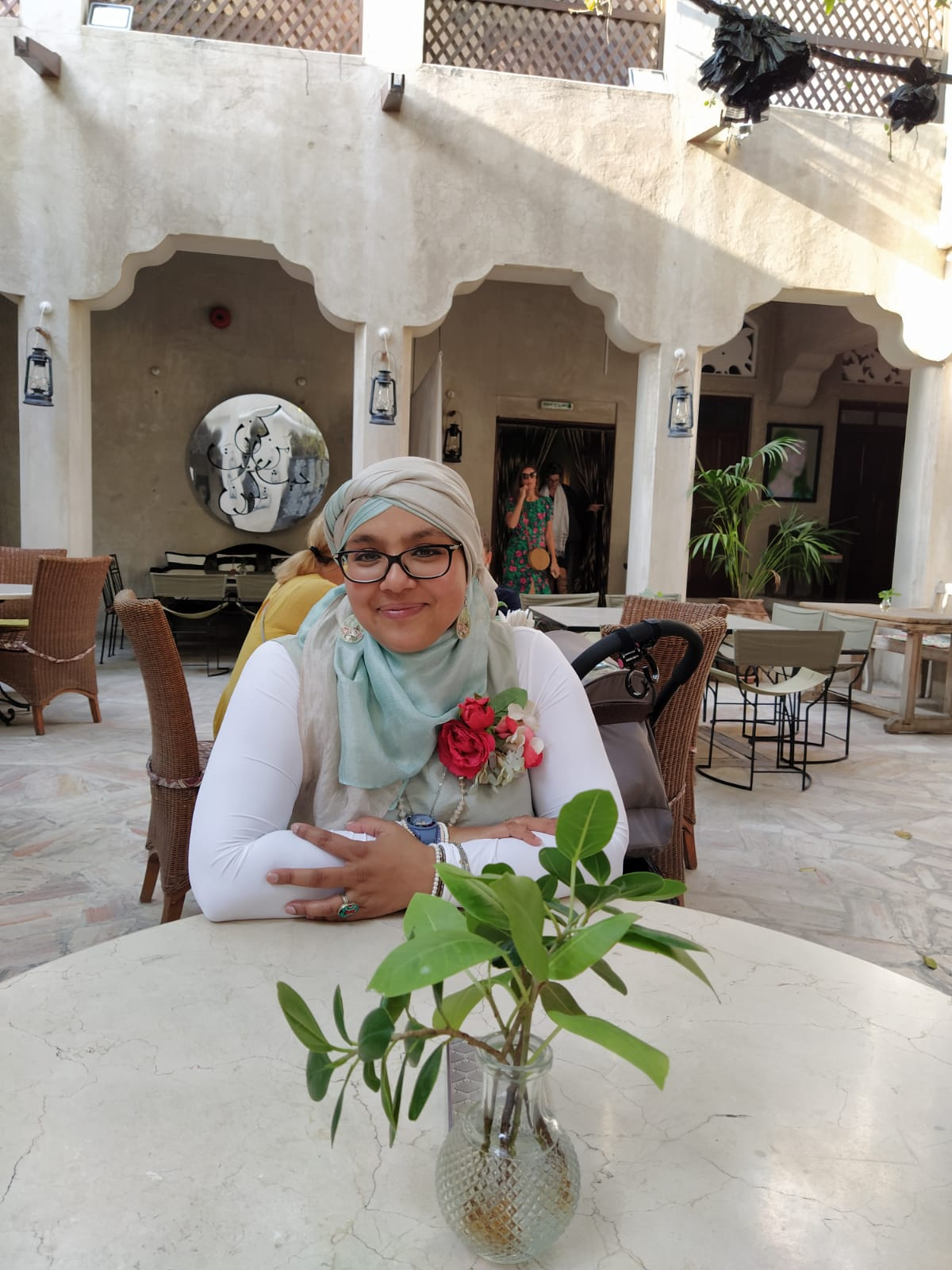
Raúf in Dubai as part of the Emirates Airline Festival of Literature

Raúf's début children's novel published by Orion Children's Books, The Boy at the Back of the Class won numerous awards, drawing on her own experience delivering emergency aid convoys for refugee families surviving in Calais and Dunkirk. Inspired by a Syrian mother and baby she encountered in a Calais refugee camp, it portrays the refugee crisis through the eyes of a child. It was a Sunday Times Bestseller, winner of the 2019 Blue Peter Book Award for Best Story, overall winner of the 2019 Waterstones Children's Book Prize, and nominated for the Carnegie Medal Children's Book Award. In the same year she was also shortlisted for the Jhalak Prize, awarded to the book of the year by a writer of colour and for breakthrough author in the BAMB (Books Are My Bag) Readers' Awards. The Boy at the Back of the Class was adapted into a play by Nick Ahad and produced by the Rose Theatre and the Children's Theatre Partnership in 2023, and this stage version was winner of Best Family Show at the 2026 Olivier Awards.

Her second book The Star Outside My Window covered hope and resilience in the face of domestic violence through the innocent eyes of 10-year-old girl. This was shortlisted for the inaugural Diverse Book Awards, and 2020 British Book Awards: Books of the Year. It also made the longlist of the UK Literacy Association Book awards.

Nominated for the 2024 Red Dot Book Awards, her fourth book “The Lion Above The Door” tackles the issue of historical racism, shining a light on the stories that cannot usually be found in history books. The book is inspired by the forgotten exploits of Wing Commander Tan Kay Hai, a decorated, Singaporean flying ace who flew with the Royal Air Force during the Second World War on at least 190 missions. In researching the book, she traveled to Singapore and different museums and RAF bases in the UK to track down records or mentions of him. Eventually finding his grave at Kranji War Cemetery and meeting with his family after an appeal to track them down in The Straits Times.

Raúf was named as one of the BBC 100 Women, a list and multi-format series of 100 inspiring and influential women from around the world, for 2019. In September 2019, she spoke at A Woman's Place UK conference; her speech criticized the inclusion of transgender women in public places including "toilets or changing rooms, specialist services or a refuge, school toilets or prison cells or hospital wards." She said that regardless of any steps taken to transition, transgender women "will still have strengths, experiences, privileges that we women will never ever have been gifted". That December she talked about "Why children are our most powerful hope for change" at TEDxLondonWomen event.

Her 2021 Barrington Stoke publication, The Great (Food) Bank Heist (illustrations by Elisa Paganelli), was a child's perspective on food poverty in the UK.

In addition to writing for publications such as The Guardian, Raúf is also a contributor to the BBC Radio 2 program Pause For Thought.

Raúf was appointed Member of the Order of the British Empire (MBE) in the 2022 New Year Honours for services to literature and women's rights.

In September 2023, Raúf signed an open letter from gender critical advocacy group Sex Matters urging UK Prime Minister Rishi Sunak "to take urgent action to halt an escalating campaign of violence and intimidation against women in the name of 'trans rights' ".

== List of works ==
- The Boy at the Back of the Class (2018)
- The Star Outside My Window (2019)
- The Day We Met the Queen (2020)
- The Night Bus Hero (2020)
- The Great (Food) Bank Heist (2021)
- The Lion Above the Door (2021)
- Hope on the Horizon: A children's handbook on empathy, kindness and making a better world (2022)
- Where Magic Grows: Unique Tales of Wonder and Enchantment (2023)
- The Letter with the Golden Stamp (2024)
- The Girl at the Front of the Class (2024)
- The Game I Will Never Forget (2025)

== Awards ==
- 2019 Blue Peter Book Award, Best Story: The Boy at the Back of the Class
- 2019 Waterstones Children's Book Prize, Younger Fiction and Overall Winner: The Boy at the Back of the Class
- 2020 Diverse Book Awards, Best Children's Book winner: The Star Outside My Window
- 2024 BolognaBookPlus, Silver Bestseller Award: The Boy at the Back of the Class
- 2026 Olivier Awards, Best Family Show: The Boy at the Back of the Class
- She was appointed a Member of the Order of the British Empire (MBE) in the 2022 New Year Honours.
