= The Boy at the Back of the Class =

2018 novel by Onjali Q. Raúf

- First edition cover
- Author: Onjali Q. Raúf
- Illustrator: Pippa Curnick
- Language: English
- Genre: Children's literature
- Publisher: Orion Children's Books (UK); Delacorte Press (US)
- Publication date: 12 July 2018
- Publication place: United Kingdom
- Pages: 320
- ISBN: 978-1510105010
- OCLC: 1126566024
- LC Class: PZ7.1.R378 Boy 2019

The Boy at the Back of the Class is a 2018 British children's novel by Onjali Q. Raúf. It was published by Orion Children's Books on 12 July 2018. Raúf's debut children's novel, the book follows a group of primary school children as refugee Ahmet joins their class. Raúf drew on her own experiences delivering emergency aid to refugee families in Calais and Dunkirk for the novel.

The novel received multiple awards, including the Waterstones Children's Book Prize 2019, and was one of the best-selling children's paperbacks of 2020 in the United Kingdom. Scholars have discussed the novel's themes. A short follow-up, The Day We Met the Queen, was released in 2020 for World Book Day. The Boy at the Back of the Class was later adapted into a play and is set to be adapted into a film.

== Plot ==
Nine-year-old Alexa (Note: Although she narrates the novel, Alexa's name and gender are not revealed until the end of the book, with one reviewer commenting that because of this, "every reader sees [the narrator] differently and perhaps feels closer to them as a result".) is a huge fan of Tintin and best friends with Josie, Michael and Tom. Their teacher, Mrs Khan, introduces to the class Ahmet Saqqal, who has just moved to London. The friends decide to befriend him but cannot find him during break times. Sitting at the back of the class, Ahmet does not speak or get involved during lessons, and unkind rumours are spread about him (such as Ahmet having a contagious disease). Eventually, Alexa offers Ahmet a lemon sherbet, which a woman in a red scarf (later revealed to be his foster mum) accepts on his behalf.

Meanwhile, the friends overhear two adults discussing the "refugee kid" in Mrs Khan's class. Ms Hemsi joins the class to help Ahmet with his lessons, and he begins to respond to the friends. Ms Hemsi tells them that Ahmet is from Syria and speaks Kurdish. He plays football with the others, but their game is interrupted by Brendan (dubbed "Brendan-the-Bully"), and the prejudiced Mr Irons confiscates the ball, as he is frustrated by Ahmet's silence. Alexa and her mum search for a pomegranate to give to Ahmet, but at school Brendan steals it. Ahmet roars at him and fights him, although the pomegranate is smashed in the commotion. Brendan continues to torment Ahmet, including by filling his rucksack with baked beans, which upsets Ahmet greatly.

Ahmet presents his story to the class, describing how the war in Syria had forced his family to flee and become refugees. He travelled on a boat to Greece, before finally making it to the UK without his family. Ahmet privately shares with Alexa that his sister, Syrah, drowned while crossing the sea, and that he does not know the whereabouts of his parents. Alexa discovers that the government is planning to close the UK's borders in nine days' time, meaning Ahmet would be unable to find his parents. She posts a letter to the Queen asking her to get her "Special Police" and the Prime Minister to find Ahmet's parents before the gates close.

Worried that the Queen has not received their letter, the group concocts an emergency plan to hand-deliver a note to Buckingham Palace. Tom and Alexa travel to the palace while the changing of the guard is taking place. With the note, Alexa runs out into the road towards the soldiers and faints. After being rescued by some Coldstream Guards who promise to deliver the note, Alexa returns home to find that her escapade has made the television news. She and her friends go to school but are swamped by reporters, with Mr Irons failing to escort the children safely into the building. A newspaper launches an international appeal to find Ahmet's family.

While Mr Irons watches on, Brendan and his friends continue to taunt Ahmet on the playground, which results in a fight filmed by the media. The footage is widely seen and the bullies apologise during assembly, while Mr Irons is sacked for not stopping the verbal abuse. Local MP Mr Fry labels Ahmet's friends "terrorists" for standing up for refugees. The children give an interview to correct the record, in which Ahmet says "I happy to have best friends on planet". The Coldstream Guards deliver a letter from the Queen, inviting the five children to tea at the palace.

On Alexa's tenth birthday, a woman from the Home Office delivers a document to the school revealing that Ahmet's parents have been found and granted asylum.

== Development ==
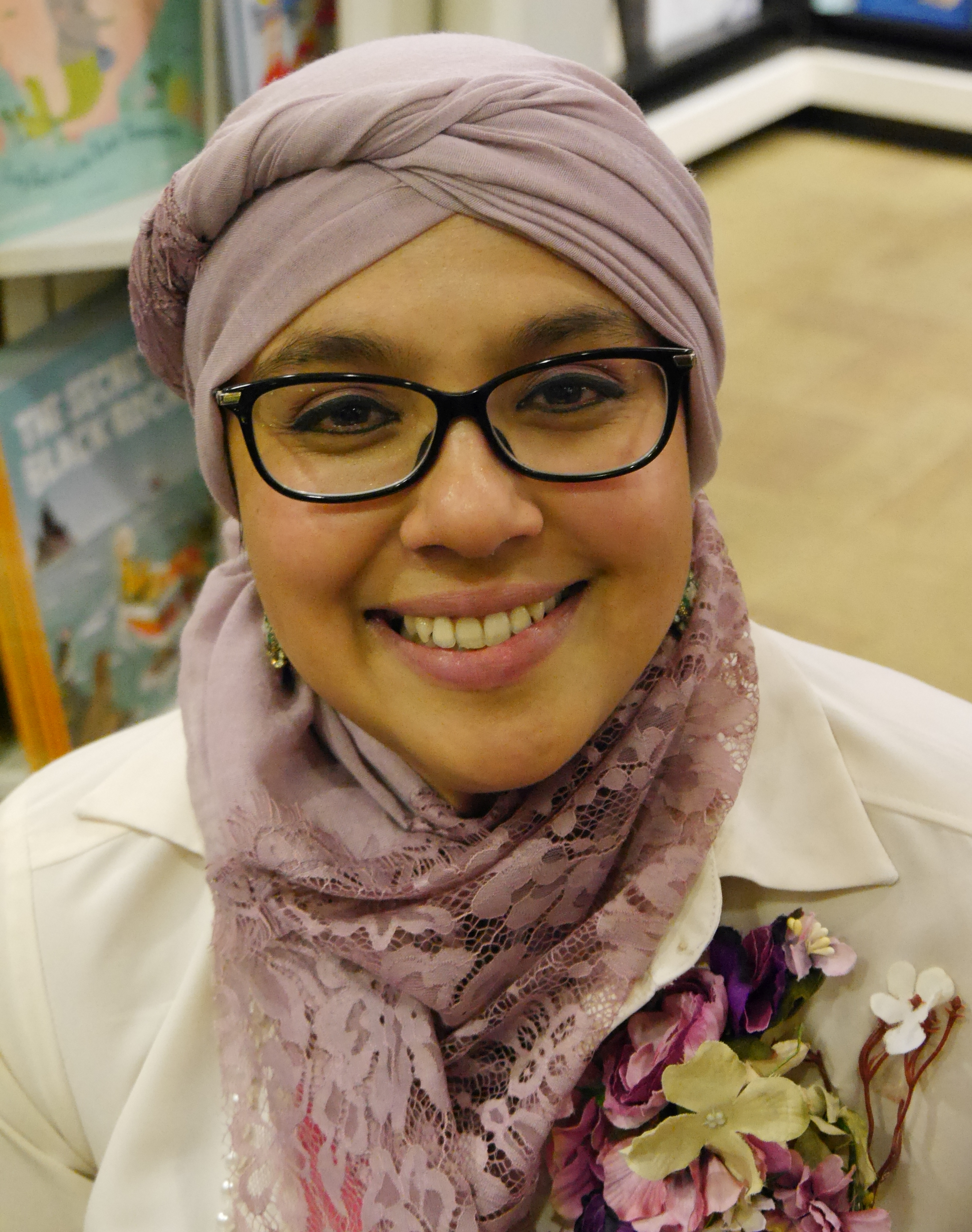
Raúf in 2019

Author Onjali Q. Raúf drew on her own experiences delivering emergency aid to refugee families in Calais and Dunkirk, which she began after seeing pictures of the death of Alan Kurdi. Raúf came up with the title of the book while at St Thomas' Hospital after having undergone life-saving surgery for endometriosis. The book is dedicated to a baby, Raehan, who had been born in a Calais refugee camp in 2016 after his mother, Zainab, had fled Syria. Raúf only met Raehan briefly but often wondered if he and Zainab were safe, later imagining Raehan coming to the UK as an older child, which served as the main inspiration for Ahmet's character. Raúf's favourite scene in the book is when Ahmet beats up the bully, Brendan. Raúf was also a fan of Tintin growing up, as she says "It made me realise there are other characters out there that looked a bit like me." The novel is Raúf's debut children's book.

== Themes ==
Professors Miralles-Alberola and Soler-Pous believe that Ahmet's rucksack is a significant symbol in the book. Despite the bag being damaged by Brendan with baked beans, Ahmet refuses to give it up. This shows his emotional attachment to the bag, having carried it from Syria, and that "if the bag represents the child's background, trading it for a more convenient one is not an option."

Professors Miralles-Alberola and Soler-Pous also believe that Ahmet's struggle to communicate is a central theme throughout the book. For example, he is unable to use the same workbook as his classmates. By providing support through Ms Hemsi, the school helps Ahmet to learn English, aided by the insistence of the other children to communicate with him through words and actions. While language is initially a barrier to education and friendship, Ahmet is able to open up once he feels secure. Alexa, having lost her father at a young age, finds it easier to sympathise with him. Professors Sylfin and Shirly have inferred that Ahmet suffers from post-traumatic stress disorder from his experiences, and sharing his story with the class helps to heal this psychological trauma.

== Release ==
The Boy at the Back of the Class was published by Orion Children's Books on 12 July 2018, and the book has been translated into over 20 languages since. It was an instant bestseller, and one of the best-selling children's paperbacks of 2020 in the United Kingdom. The book was the most popular primary school-age book in Scotland in the 2021–2022 academic year.

An audiobook of the novel was narrated by Imogen Wilde. In 2020, Raúf released a short follow-up, The Day We Met the Queen for World Book Day.

== Reception ==
The Boy at the Back of the Class received positive reviews from critics, and has been recommended by The New York Times for children starting at a new school, and former Children's Laureate, Cressida Cowell as one of the best back-to-school books. Waterstones children's fiction buyer Florentyna Martin commented that the story "sparkles with kindness, humour and curiosity". Various independent reviewers praised the book, with Charlotte Ndupuechi remarking that the book is a "beautifully written, thought-provoking children’s novel, full of fun, friendship, adventure, and standing up for what’s right."

The Boy at the Back of the Class was the winner of the Blue Peter Book Award 2019 for Best Story, overall winner of the Waterstones Children's Book Prize 2019, and winner of the BolognaBookPlus Silver Bestseller Award. The book was also nominated for the Carnegie Medal Children's Book Award, and shortlisted for the Jhalak Prize and the Branford Boase Award.

== Adaptations ==
=== Stage ===
The Boy at the Back of the Class was adapted into a play written by Nick Ahad, who described the novel as "a nightmare to adapt for the stage", identifying Ahmet's lack of English as a particular challenge. Directed by Monique Touko, the show premiered at the Rose Theatre, Kingston in February 2024, and was revived in 2026, with a tour beginning at the Rose Theatre and visiting Queen Elizabeth Hall. The Boy at the Back of the Class received generally positive reviews from critics, and won Best Family Show at the 2026 Laurence Olivier Awards.

=== Film ===
In 2023, it was reported that Jason Isaacs, Vanessa Redgrave and Freida Pinto were set to feature in a film adaptation, directed by Stephen Herek and written by Tim John.
