= Lisa Thompson (author) =

English children's book author

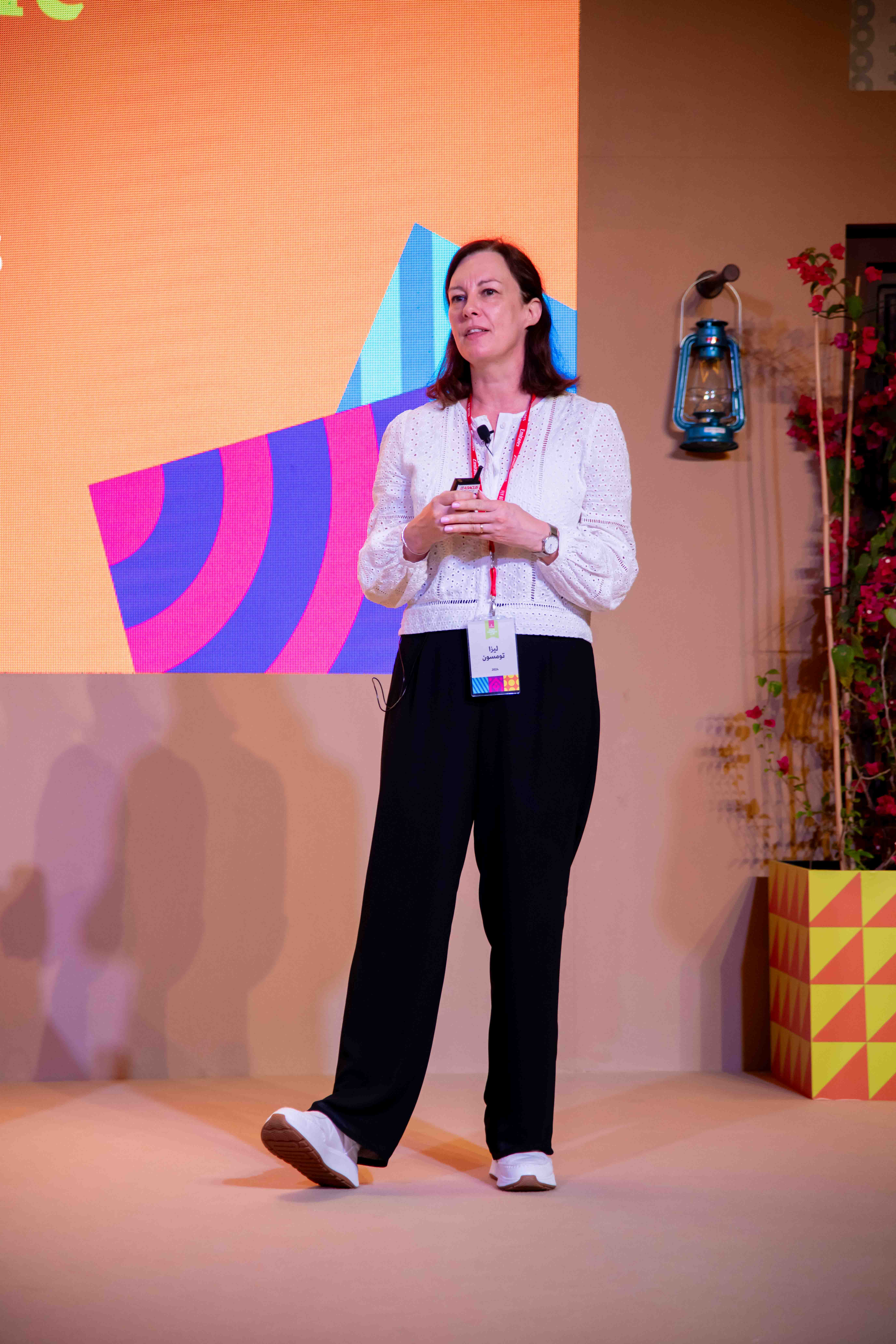
- from LitFest 2024 in UAE
- Born: 5 May 1973 (age 52); Hornchurch, London, England
- Occupation: Children's writer
- Spouse: Stuart
- Children: Ben, Isobel
- Website: http://www.lisathompsonauthor.com/

Lisa Thompson is an English author of children's books.

== Biography ==
Thompson was born and raised in the London Borough of Havering (Hornchurch, Upminster), England. After leaving school at age 16, she worked in insurance for a couple of years. In 1991, she joined the BBC, eventually becoming a radio broadcast assistant. She left the BBC in 2002 and later became a freelance radio broadcast assistant with an independent production company. At age 43, Thompson debuted her first book.

== Writing ==
Thompson's debut novel, The Goldfish Boy, was published by Scholastic in 2017. A review in Kirkus wrote that the book "strikes the perfect balance, seemingly without compromise, between an issue-driven novel and one with broad, commercial appeal." The Goldfish Boy was a national bestseller and was shortlisted for the Waterstones Children's Book Prize.

The following year, Thompson published The Light Jar. The book was described in The Guardian as a "a thoughtful and hugely empathetic book". It was followed by The Day I Was Erased (2019) and The Boy Who Fooled the World (2020).

Thompson's first novella, Owen and the Soldier (2019), was published by Barrington Stoke and became the first dyslexia-friendly title to be shortlisted for the Blue Peter Book Awards. That same year, Thompson contributed a short story to Return to Wonderland, a collection of new stories set in Lewis Carroll's fictional world.

Her second novella, The House of Clouds, was published in 2020, and in 2021 The Graveyard Riddle (which revisited characters from her first novel, The Goldfish Boy) was followed by her third novella, The Small Things.

The Rollercoaster Boy and The Treasure Hunters were released in 2022 and 2023 respectively, as were Sidney Makes a Wish and Carrie and the Roller Boots, two stories for younger children with illustrations by Jess Rose, which were her fourth and fifth titles for Barrington Stoke.

Further books followed.

== Personal life ==
Thompson is married to Stuart and they have two children, Ben and Isobel.

== Published works ==
=== Novels ===
Title	Year	Publisher
The Goldfish Boy	2017	Scholastic
The Light Jar	2018	Scholastic
The Day I Was Erased	2019	Scholastic
The Boy Who Fooled the World	2020	Scholastic
The Graveyard Riddle	2021	Scholastic
The Rollercoaster Boy	2022	Scholastic
The Treasure Hunters	2023	Scholastic
The Mystery of the Forever Weekend	2024	Scholastic

=== Novellas ===
Title	Year	Illustrations	Publisher
Owen and the Soldier	2019		Barrington Stoke
The House of Clouds	2020		Barrington Stoke
The Small Things	2021		Barrington Stoke
The Boy in the Tree	2025	Katie Kear	Barrington Stoke

=== For younger children ===
Title	Illustrations	Year	Publisher
Sidney Makes a Wish	Jess Rose	2022	Barrington Stoke
Carrie and the Roller Boots	Jess Rose	2023	Barrington Stoke
Sidney and Carrie Have a Party	Jess Rose	2024	Barrington Stoke
Worry Boots	Aysha Awwad	2024	Scholastic

=== Short stories ===
Title	From	Year	Publisher
The Knave of Hearts	Return to Wonderland (Various authors)	2019	Macmillan Children's Books
