= Bookclub (radio programme) =

BBC radio show

- Genre: Literature discussion
- Running time: 30 minutes
- Country of origin: United Kingdom
- Language(s): English
- Home station: BBC Radio 4
- Hosted by: Jim Naughtie
- Website: Official website

Bookclub is a monthly programme, devised by Olivia Seligman and hosted by Jim Naughtie and broadcast on BBC Radio 4. Each month a novel is selected, and its author invited to discuss it. The title of the chosen work for the next recording is announced at the end of each broadcast; this allows listeners to read the book in advance, and those who attend recording to prepare questions which they can then put to the author.

== See also ==
- Books in the United Kingdom
