= Lucy Lethbridge =

British writer

External media

Audio
- "Fresh Air with Terry Gross, 2 January 2014: Interview with Lucy Lethbridge; Review of new Sam Philips' box set; Commentary on Netflix's "micro-genres.", Fresh Air with Terry Gross. Scroll down to 'View online' to hear the audio interview.

Video
- "Opinion Journal: You'll Never Need Windex Again", Bari Weiss, 20 May 2016, WSJ Video

Lucy Lethbridge (born Hammersmith, London) is a British author of non-fiction books for children and adults.

== Career ==
Lethbridge is the author of a history of the largest single occupation in 20th century Great Britain: Servants: A Downstairs View of Twentieth Century Britain (Bloomsbury, March 2013). She examines the difficult and changing relationships between employers and domestic workers in the 19th and 20th centuries. Servants in the 19th and 20th century were found in all but the very poorest houses, ranging from a single "skivvy" in a poor household, to country houses whose staff numbered in the hundreds. Lethbridge has drawn from a wide range of both oral and written accounts to create a book that is "empathetic, wide-ranging and well-written".

Drawing on the same research, Lethbridge has also published Spit and Polish: Old-Fashioned Ways to Banish Dirt, Dust and Decay and Mind your manors : tried-and-true British household cleaning tips. Both how-to books contain traditional household hints and by-gone tricks for looking after homes. These range from the useful to the ridiculous and sometimes the revolting (e.g. "hang the skin of a freshly killed bear in your bedroom.")

Lethbridge has collaborated on a number of history books for children in the "Who was..." series from Short Books, Inc. Ada Lovelace, the Computer Wizard of Victorian Britain, won the Blue Peter Book Award for non-fiction in 2002. Other titles include Annie Oakley : sharpshooter of the Wild West, Henry Smith : his life & legacy, Florence Nightingale, St. Francis of Assisi : the patron saint of animals, and Napoleon.

Lethbridge writes for magazines including The Observer, The Sunday Telegraph, The Independent on Sunday and The Times Literary Supplement. She preceded Sue Gaisford as the Literary Editor of The Tablet and has been a London correspondent for ARTnews in New York. She has been the literary editor of The Catholic Herald, and has edited the collection A Deep but Dazzling Darkness: An Anthology of personal experiences of God with Selina O'Grady.
