= The Thornthwaite Inheritance =

First edition (publ. Bloomsbury)

The Thornthwaite Inheritance is a children's macabre crime novel by British author Gareth P. Jones. It was published in 2009.

== Plot summary ==
Ovid and Lorelli Thornthwaite are thirteen-year-old twins and they are very unusual. They wear only black, eat only bland food, listen and play only sombre music and have no electric appliances other than light bulbs in their house. But what is even stranger is their desire to kill each other! When Lorelli and Ovid create a truce on their 13th birthday, Lorelli brings a lawyer into the house to add to their deceased parents' will. If one of the twins kills the other before their 16th birthday, the day in which they inherit half of the Thornthwaite's massive inheritance, the other will immediately be cut out of the will. But bizarre murder attempts continue to be made, and the twins, though deeply suspicious of each other, work together to uncover the explanation. The book ends with the twins promising to discontinue trying to kill each other, and hoping that they have a better life, after they have discovered the culprit who got killed by a contraption designed to kill the twins.

== Critical reception ==
The story was quite well received by critics. It won the Doncaster Book Award, and also the Rotherham Book Award. The Times said that the book is "surely material for a film". Books for Keeps noted its similarity to Lemony Snicket's A Series of Unfortunate Events but thought it was less repetitive and manipulative towards the reader. The Bookbag praised the likeable characters, but noted the excessive use of plot twists, and thought that the style of writing was dull.

== Adaptations ==
A brilliant musical based on the book premiered at the Erindale Theatre in Canberra, Australia, 13–18 September 2020, with script, production and direction by Shaylie Maskell, and music written and conducted by Caleb Wells, for new Canberra theatre company Green Oak Theatre Company.
