= Gareth P. Jones =

English children's writer

Gareth P. Jones is an English children's writer, and author of the Dragon Detective Agency series of books.

He is best known for his comic-gothic book The Considine Curse, which won the Blue Peter Book Award in 2012, and for The Thornthwaite Inheritance. He also writes a series of books called Ninja Meerkats.

As well as being an author, Gareth works as a TV producer.

== Published books ==
- The Dragon Detective Agency: The Case of the Missing Cats (2006)
- The Dragon Detective Agency: The Case of the Wayward Professor (2007)
- The Dragon Detective Agency:The Case of the Vanished Sea Dragon (2008)
- The Dragon Detective Agency: The Case of the Stolen Film (2008)
- Perry's 5 (2009)
- The Thornthwaite Inheritance (2009)
- The Space Crime Conspiracy (2010)
- The Considine Curse (2011)
- The Clan of the Scorpion (Ninja Meerkats 1) (2011)
- The Eye of the Monkey (Ninja Meerkats 2) (2011)
- The Escape from Ice Mountain (Ninja Meerkats 3) (2011)
- Hollywood Showdown (Ninja Meerkats 4) (2012)
- The Tomb of Doom (Ninja Meerkats 5) (2012)
- The Big City Bust-Up (Ninja Meerkats 6) (2012)
- The Ultimate Dragon Warrior (Ninja Meerkats 7) (2013)
- Outback Attack (Ninja Meerkats 8) (2013)
- Constable and Toop (2012)
- No True Echo (2015)
- The Thornthwaite Betrayal (2016)
- The Big Book of Nothing
- Death or icecream? (2016)
