= Biscuit Bear =

Book by Mini Grey

- Author: Mini Grey
- Illustrator: Mini Grey
- Language: English
- Genre: Children's
- Publisher: Jonathan Cape
- Publication date: 1 April 2004
- Publication place: United Kingdom
- Pages: 32 pp
- ISBN: 978-0-224-06496-5
- OCLC: 56448744
- Dewey Decimal: [E] 22
- LC Class: PZ7.G873 Bis 2004

Biscuit Bear (known in the United States as Ginger Bear) is a children's picture book written and illustrated by Mini Grey, published in 2004. It won the Nestlé Children's Book Prize Gold Award, as well as being shortlisted for the Blue Peter Book Awards and longlisted for the Kate Greenaway Medal.
