= Glenn Murphy =

British children's writer

Glenn Murphy is a British children's writer. His book Why is Snot Green? was shortlisted for the 2007 Blue Peter Book Awards and was a finalist for the Royal Society Junior Science Book of the Year 2008

He is also the author of the sequel to Why Is Snot Green?, How Loud Can You Burp? and the Global Issues book series for young readers.

Murphy is considered one of the leading authors in the grossology genre.

== Bibliography ==
- Why Is Snot Green (2007) – US edition (Flash Point imprint/Roaring Brook Press, April 2009) subtitled And Other Extremely Important Questions (and Answers): "Written while Murphy was in charge of a team of “science communicators” at the Science Museum in London, this seriously funny collection of science facts is based on the questions kids and adults asked." – Science Museum series (Note: Murphy's first book Why is Snot Green? (2007) was inspired by questions from visitors to the London Science Museum where he worked. At least four of his books have been published in Britain with "Science Museum" subtitles; in the first case, Why is snot green?: and other extremely important questions (and answers) from the Science Museum. Some library catalogue records attribute responsibility to the Science Museum as well as Murphy (and perhaps illustrator Mike Phillips). OCLC 137214814 225426805 664323897 720517806)
- How Loud Can You Burp? (2008) – Science Museum series
- A Kid's Guide to Global Warming (2008)
- Stuff That Scares Your Pants Off (2009) – US edition (Roaring Brook, 2011) subtitled A Book of Scary Things (and How to Avoid Them) and/or The Science Scoop on more than 39 Terrifying Phenomena: "Reluctant readers, especially, will find Murphy's chatty, lighthearted approach appealing, enjoyable and informative. (source notes, index) (Nonfiction. 8-12)"
- Inventions (2009)
- Small Steps (2009)
- Turning Points: Science (2010)
- Science Sorted: Space, Black Holes and Stuff (2010)
- Science Sorted: Evolution, Nature and Things (2010)
- Do Bugs Have Bottoms? (World Book Day 2011) – Science Museum series
- Will Farts Destroy the Planet? (2011) – Science Museum series
- Science Sorted: Brains, Bodies, Guts and Stuff (2011)
- Science Sorted: Robots, Chips and Techno Stuff (2011), Science Sorted series
- Does Farting Make You Faster? (2012)
- Supergeek: Robots, Space and Furry Animals (2014)
- Supergeek: Dinosaurs, Brains and Supertrains (2014)
- Poo! What Is That Smell? (2014)
- Space: The Whole Whizz-Bang Story, illustrated by Mike Phillips (Pan Macmillan, 2014), Science Sorted series
- Evolution: The Whole Life-On-Earth Story (2014)
- Bodies: The Whole Blood-Pumping Story (2014)
- Disgusting Science (2014)
