= Brita Granström =

Swedish artist (born 1969)

Brita Granström (born 1969) is a Swedish artist who graduated from Konstfack Stockholm in 1994 and now lives and works between Great Britain and her homeland as a painter and illustrator.

== Painting ==
In 2011 Granström's self-portrait Mother of Four was bought by The Ruth Borchard Collection. A major solo exhibition Life in Landscape opened in London at Kings Place Gallery and toured to The University Gallery in Newcastle in 2012 under the title A Breath of Fresh Air. Recent exhibitions include The Night Swimmer (2014) at The University Gallery, Newcastle upon Tyne and Sea Salt & Sourdough (2015) at The Open Eye Gallery Edinburgh. She is represented by Thompson's Galleries Aldeburgh.

== Illustration ==
Granström was shortlisted for the ALMA (Astrid Lindgren Memorial Award), in 2013 and 2014 for her children's books. The ALMA is the largest children's literature award in the world. She was elected as a Fellow of the English Association in May 2011. As a children's book illustrator, Granström often collaborates with her associate and partner, Mick Manning. They have produced various children's titles, such as Charlie's War Illustrated (Frances Lincoln) - winner of the 2014 English Association Award. Taff in the WAAF, their book about Manning's mother's war service for Bletchley Park, won the English Association Award in 2011. In 1998 The Scotsman newspaper wrote: "Mick Manning and Brita Granström's approach to non-fiction for younger children has revolutionised our bookshelves".
