= Frozen in Time (novel) =

2009 novel by Ali Sparkes

- First edition cover
- Author: Ali Sparkes
- Language: English
- Genre: Novel
- Publisher: OUP Oxford
- Publication date: 1 January 2009
- Publication place: United Kingdom
- Pages: 336
- ISBN: 0-19-272755-9

Frozen in Time is a book by author Ali Sparkes. It has won two Blue Peter Awards. Set in 2009 Britain, the story researches cryonic suspension and life in 1956 Britain.

The main characters are Ben, Rachel, Freddy, Polly and Uncle J (JJ).

== Plot ==
Ben and Rachel are staying in their house with their dreary old uncle when the TV satellite breaks and the TV explodes. Unable to do anything to amuse themselves, Ben and Rachel start digging in the garden and find themselves opening a hatch. They drop themselves into it and find themselves in what looks like an old-fashioned underground bunker house, where they find what looks like a torpedo and are perplexed to see two 'dead' bodies in it. Rachel accidentally presses a button and the torpedoes open and the bodies come to life. Rachel faints and Ben starts talking gibberish in his shock. The two people that had before seemed dead introduced themselves as Freddy and Polly Emerson and asked why they were in their fathers' vault. When Rachel and Ben explained, they first refused to believe it, but then believed when Rachel and Ben took them into their house. Freddy and Polly revealed they had been put into cryonic suspension - their father had frozen their hearts and was able to make them start again. Freddy and Polly had been put to sleep in 1956 and woken up in 2009. They could not understand why their father had deserted them.

In time, Rachel and Ben introduce them to 2009, and Freddy and Polly are frequently shocked. They get sent to school (under the name Robertson, in case there's anyone old enough on the school staff to remember) and try to research what happened to their father. A cheerful librarian gives them documents. One day, Rachel reads an email sent to her by her uncle which reads: "Get out of the house now!!! You are in danger!" Ben and Freddy, who had been escaping bullies who constantly taunt them partly because of Ben's stutter and partly because of Freddy and Polly's posh accents and their peculiar habits, come back to see Rachel and Polly being drugged and thrown into the boot of the car. Ben knocks a man out with a camera and runs to the librarian, who had been behind it all. She had suspected Freddy and Polly's real identity and wanted to learn how to use cryonic suspension. Ben is also drugged and thrown into the car.

The car drives away and Rachel wakes up to see Polly being taken out of the car to be boarded onto a helicopter. She finds a torch, picks the lock of the boot with a hairgrip and sprays antiseptic into the librarian's eyes. They then get taken to a place where all the people who were working to find Freddy and Polly's father have been working on helping them to escape and Freddy and Polly are reunited with their Father, who built another cryonic suspension machine and froze himself inside it so that he would not grow old and die without his children. The story ends with Freddy and Polly trying to teach their father about 2009 life.

== Reviews ==
The book has had positive reviews from critics. TheBookBag.co.uk called it "the first brilliantly inventive and rollicking fantastical adventure for the 8+ audience for 2009".
