= Barrington Stoke =

Book publisher based in Edinburgh

- Founded: 1998; 28 years ago
- Founder: Patience Thomson and Lucy Juckes
- Country of origin: UK
- Headquarters location: Edinburgh, Scotland
- Distribution: Bounce Sales and Marketing
- Publication types: Books
- Nonfiction topics: Children's & teens nonfiction
- Fiction genres: Children's & teens fiction
- Official website: www.barringtonstoke.co.uk

Barrington Stoke is a children's book publisher based in Edinburgh, Scotland. The company was founded in 1998 and publishes fiction and non-fiction adapted to different reading ages for reluctant, under-confident and dyslexic children and teens. The books are printed on cream paper to reduce glare and language-edited to increase readability. The text is a specially adapted dyslexia-friendly font, with a considered layout and numerous chapter breaks.

Barrington Stoke was awarded Publisher of the Year in 2007 by the Independent Publisher’s Guild. In 2020, Barrington Stoke had its first CILIP Carnegie Medal winner with Lark by Anthony McGowan.

== History ==
Barrington Stoke was founded by Patience Thomson and Lucy Juckes in 1998. Thomson was a principal of a specialist school for dyslexic students and Juckes had held a marketing role with Bloomsbury Publishing. They identified children and young people excluded from books due to dyslexia or other reading issues. The pair then formed Barrington Stoke in Juckes’ living room, with an aim to produce books with a different design and editorial approach, along with a shorter format to support less able readers.

== Authors ==
Barrington Stoke publishes well-known children's authors such as Kevin Brooks, Terry Deary, Elizabeth Kay, Anthony McGowan, Robert Swindells, Lisa Thompson, Onjali Q Raúf and Diana Wynne Jones. The company also publishes previous Children’s Laureates such as Anne Fine, Michael Morpurgo, Malorie Blackman, Michael Rosen, Julia Donaldson and Laureate na nÓg Eoin Colfer. Some authors better known for writing for adults also write for Barrington Stoke, including Eric Brown, Allan Guthrie, James Lovegrove and Gwyneth Jones writing as Ann Halam.

== Imprints ==
Barrington Stoke launched its Picture Squirrel imprint in 2014 after a dyslexic father lamented the fact that he could not read to his daughter. Michael Morpurgo was the first children's author to join Barrington Stoke's picture book list.

In 2015 the company ventured into digital and launched Tints, a dyslexia-friendly reading app that allowed its specially designed books to be accessed via tablets.

== See also ==
- Scottish Publishers Association
