= Simon Chapman (author) =

British children's writer

Simon David "Chappers" Chapman (born 26 April 1965) is a British children's writer, explorer and science teacher. His books include the Explorers Wanted! series, of which Explorers Wanted! At the North Pole won a Blue Peter Book Award in 2005. Chapman teaches Science at Morecambe Bay Academy in Lancashire. Chapman studied mechanical engineering at University of Manchester.
