= Glenn Murphy (footballer) =

Australian rules footballer

Personal information
- Full name: Glenn Murphy
- Born: 2 December 1949 (age 76)
- Original team: Chelsea (MPNFL)
- Height: 180 cm (5 ft 11 in)
- Weight: 83 kg (183 lb)

Playing career^{1}
Years	Club	Games (Goals)
1968–70	Hawthorn	32 (6)
- ^{1} Playing statistics correct to the end of 1970.

Glenn Murphy (born 2 December 1949) is a former Australian rules footballer who played with Hawthorn in the Victorian Football League (VFL).
