= Clinical Ethics =

- Discipline: Medical ethics Clinical ethics Bioethics Medical law
- Language: English
- Edited by: Jonathan Lewis

Publication details
- History: 2006-present
- Publisher: SAGE Publications
- Frequency: Quarterly

Standard abbreviations
- ISO 4: Clin. Ethics

Indexing
- ISSN: 1477-7509 (print); 1758-101X (web)
- OCLC no.: 85899237

Links
- Journal homepage; Online access; Online archive

Clinical Ethics is a quarterly peer-reviewed academic journal that covers medical ethics, clinical ethics, bioethics and medical law. The editor-in-chief is Jonathan Lewis (University of Manchester). It was established in 2006 and is published by SAGE Publications.

== Abstracting and indexing ==
The journal is abstracted and indexed in PubMed and Scopus.
