= Lucy Coats =

English writer

- Born: April 1961 (age 65); Basingstoke, Hampshire, England
- Occupation: Writer
- Writing career
- Genres: Children's picture books, poetry, Greek myth, Celtic myth, fantasy
- Notable work: Atticus the Storyteller
- Website: lucycoats.com

Lucy Coats (born April 1961) is an English writer of picture books, poetry, stories and novels for children of all ages. Her speciality is retelling myths and legend from many cultures.

== Biography ==
Lucy Coats was born in Hampshire, England. She grew up in the small country village of Dummer, and was sent to a boarding school in Kent. In 1979 she went to Edinburgh University where she graduated with an MA in English Literature and Ancient History. She worked as a children's book editor in London and New York, before becoming a full-time children's author. She is married with two children and lives in Northamptonshire. Coats's interests include reading, cooking, gardening and shamanism, and she is a member of the Order of Bards, Ovates and Druids (OBOD). As well as writing, she also visits schools, reading stories and hosting Celtic poetry workshops for children.

== Bibliography ==
Coats has written poems and books for all her life. In 1986 she won the Selfridges/Parker Pen poetry competition, and in 2004 Atticus the Storyteller was shortlisted for the Blue Peter Book Award. Her first published poem was in Island of the Children (Orchard 1987), and since then she has had poems and stories included in many anthologies.

== Picture books ==
=== One Hungry Baby ===
Which Kirkus Reviews called ‘a thoroughly adorable counting rhyme’, was published by 1992, and is Coats's first book.

=== One Smiling Sister ===
Another counting book for pre-schoolers was published in 2000.

=== Down in the Daisies ===
A mixture of weather, counting and baby animals around the world.

=== King Ocean’s Flute ===
Is the story of Paulo, a shepherd boy who learns to play the flute from listening to the voices of all the creatures around him. When King Ocean hears Paulo challenging him, he summons the boy down to his underwater palace for a musical duel. Beautiful watercolours by Peter Malone and a lyrical text inspired the Sunday Times to name it their Children's Book of the Week, and call it a ‘masterpiece’.

=== Poetry Books ===
==== First Rhymes ====
Published in 1994, this is a collection of new and adapted nursery rhymes. Poetry for 6 and Under described the work as a collection children would want to hear repeatedly.

=== Myths and Legends ===
==== Atticus the Storyteller’s 100 Greek Myths ====
Is Coats's best known book, and is the biggest collection of Greek Myths for children ever written. The narrator is Atticus, a sandalmaker from Crete, who travels round Ancient Greece with Melissa the Donkey, telling the stories in the actual geographical locations where they are meant to have happened. Atticus's journey can be followed on a map, and the book is copiously illustrated in colour by Anthony Lewis. Atticus has also been published in Greek, Italian, Hebrew and Serbo-Croat, as well as being recorded on CD by Simon Russell Beale. Junior Education chose it as Book of the Month and included it in 100 Best Books of 2002, calling it ‘storytelling at its most compelling’. It was also shortlisted for the Blue Peter Book Award.

==== Coll the Storyteller’s Book of Enchantments ====
Takes the boy bard, Coll, and his magical raven, Branwen, on a quest round the British Isles to find Merlin and rescue the Thirteen Treasures of the Island of Britain from Viking raiders. On the way from his home at Callanish in the Hebrides, he visits the Isle of Man, Ireland, Wales, Brittany and Cornwall, telling fifty of the best Celtic myths and legends on his way. Once again illustrated by Anthony Lewis, like Atticus, there is a map of Coll and Branwen's journey, and a link between geographical location and story. The Times calls the stories ‘among the best we have--ideal for bedtime reading and/or holidays in Britain’.

=== Novels ===
==== Hootcat Hill ====
Is Coats's first novel for 11- to 14-year-olds, published in 2008 by Orion Children's Books. It tells the story of Linnet Perry, whose destiny is set as the Maiden Guardian from the moment a boy dies in Black Meadows on a fine spring evening, Linnet must conquer the dreadful worldwyrm and send him back to sleep at the heart of the earth, and her hair-raising quest will take her from her hometown of Wyrmesbury to the otherworld of Avallon to battle the evil Fey sorceress, Fidget Reedglitter. She must leave behind everything familiar and safe and set out into the unknown, through the Door in the Owlstones on Hootcat Hill.
