= Simon Bartram =

British writer and children's illustrator

Simon Bartram is an English illustrator and writer of children's picture books. He was one runner-up for the Mother Goose Award in 1999 for Pinocchio and for the Kate Greenaway Medal in 2002 for Man on the Moon: A Day in the Life of Bob. In 2004, Man on the Moon was voted "best illustrated book to read aloud" by a panel of Blue Peter viewers and also named the Blue Peter Book Award Book of the Year.
