= Montmorency series =

Young adult novel series by Eleanor Updale (2003–2013)

Montmorency Series
- Montmorency; Montmorency on the Rocks; Montmorency and the Assassins; Montmorency's Revenge; Montmorency Returns
- Author: Eleanor Updale
- Country: United Kingdom
- Genre: Adventure, crime, historical, mystery, spy fiction
- Publisher: Scholastic
- Published: 2003 to 2013
- Media type: Print (hard, softcover), Audio

The Montmorency series are five young adult historical crime novels written by Eleanor Updale and first published from 2003 to 2013. It features Montmorency, an English ex-convict turned gentleman detective and spy, for whom both the first book and the series are named. The first book is set in London, frequently in its sewers, and London remains a primary setting. The last novel was released in 2013 after a six-year break.

== Main characters ==
- Montmorency, an ex-convict-turned-gentleman, works for the British government as a spy
- Scarper, Montmorency's thief alter-ego
- Lord George Fox-Selwyn
- Dr Robert Farcett
- Cissie
- Mr Longman
- Lady B
- Mrs Evans
- Vi Evans
- Freakshow, publicly known as 'The Hopping Horror'

== Series ==
=== Montmorency (2003) ===
Updale's first novel, Montmorency, was published in the UK by Scholastic Corporation in 2003 (and subsequently by its Orchard Books imprint in the U.S. under the title Montmorency: thief, liar, gentleman?).

London, England, 1875. The main character falls through a glass roof onto a grinding machine below while fleeing from the police. Doctor Robert Farcett saves the thief's life by performing surgery. Farcett continues to work on the thief after he is imprisoned and given the temporary name "Prisoner 493". The prisoner has no name other than "Montmorency", which was the name on the bag he had when he was captured. He adopts this name and slowly begins to craft a persona to match.

During his sentence, Montmorency becomes a chief exhibit at the Scientific Society where he comes across Sir Joseph Bazalgette, who is the planner and supervisor of the ongoing London sewer project. Montmorency realises that the sewers are the perfect escape route for his daring robberies. He has high hopes for living as a gentlemen by selling the expensive items he could steal via the sewers. Montmorency realises that rich people do not normally smell like sewer water or wear ratty clothes, he finds himself in need of an accomplice—a fellow thief with knowledge, capability, and secrecy to perform the robberies. He develops a second identity—Scarper—to mask his true identity. Scarper, the thief, poses as a servant to the extravagant and wealthy Montmorency.

Montmorency is released after three years in prison. At this point, all communications between Dr Farcett and Montmorency cease. Scarper carries out many robberies (including burgling Doctor Farcett), and is never caught. The robberies committed by Scarper make the newspapers. Eventually the police pick up a man named "Freakshow", a friend of Montmorency's from his prison days, and pin Scarper's robberies on him. He is hanged for Scarper's crimes. The hanging becomes a great source of guilt for Montmorency/Scarper.

Montmorency saves George Fox-Selwyn from a carriage accident. They hit it off and become friends, then Fox-Selwyn gives Montmorency a job as a spy for the British government. His first assignment is to break into an embassy and listen for information that could prevent European war, which earns him a permanent position in the British government.

Eventually, Montmorency sheds the Scarper persona and returns all the stolen goods that remain in his possession, resolving to be an honest man.

=== Montmorency on the Rocks ===
Five years later, Montmorency, the ex-thief and liar, and Lord George Fox-Selwyn are undercover agents for the British Crown. Through their numerous dangerous exploits in the far reaches of war-torn Europe, the two men have come to depend on each other for their lives. The book begins in the aftermath of intelligence gathering trip in Turkey, where Montmorency has picked up a strange Turkish drug and become addicted which lands them in danger as well as leaking state secrets.

Meanwhile, Dr Robert Farcett accidentally kills one of his patients in front of a live audience in an operating amphitheatre. Sickened that his ethics have been overshadowed by his ambition, Farcett resolves to leave his practice. With Farcett about to give up medicine, and Montmorency near death from his drug addiction, Fox-Selwyn decides that the only way to save them both is to reunite the two men.

Fox-Selwyn invites Farcett and Montmorency to his family castle in Scotland, where he hopes that Farcett will be able to cure Montmorency of his addiction, and regain his own confidence in medicine. Arriving at Glendarvie Castle, Montmorency suffers from severe drug withdrawal.

As the three friends spend time in Scotland, the bombing of a London train station summons Fox-Selwyn back to England. Too weak to travel, Montmorency joins Farcett in escorting a young maid named Morag from the castle to a remote island in the Scottish Isles, following the death of her younger brother. On the island Doctor Farcett is mystified by an unknown agent who has been killing an entire generation of children. Working with Maggie Goudie, the island's school teacher and midwife he tries to get to the heart of the mystery. After a period of recovery, Montmorency and Farcett are summoned back to London by Fox-Selwyn to assist in the investigation.

The trio encounters Vi Evans, the daughter of Scarper's old land-lady, and finds her to be a key witness in the case. The lives of Scarper and Montmorency now intersect, and Montmorency reveals his criminal past and background to Fox-Selwyn, Farcett and Vi. Outside a second terrorist bombing takes place. Through evidence provided by Vi and Scarper's skills, the investigation comes to a close as the bombers are caught.

=== Montmorency and the Assassins ===
The third book in the series takes place 20 years after the events of the first book

Montmorency and his friend Lord George Fox-Selwyn are on a leisurely assignment, searching for Lord Astleman's missing scientific specimens in Italy shortly after the Bava-Beccaris massacre. They discover them to be hidden at La Specola, the natural history museum in Florence. The curator helps them with their quest. They are also visiting George's brother and nephews, Frank and Alexander. Frank uncovers a gang trying to take down the aristocrats but doesn't realize how dangerous they are until he hurts someone unintentionally and has to flee the country with his family so he doesn't make them look bad. Events lead one to another, and eventually an anarchist plot led by Errico Malatesta is revealed to be in its most dangerous stages.

Meanwhile, Dr Farcett is busy working on Tarimond with Maggie on his new X-ray machine. Vi and her son Tom live on Tarimond, where Tom wonders about who his father might be. (The book hints at various people who could be Tom's father, including Montmorency, George, Dr Farcett, and even George's butler.) All of them help Montmorency and George try to stop the anarchists' terrible plan. Frank, also in Florence with his family on vacation, is swept into the anarchists plot when his friend Guido pushes him to help him in one of the attacks. One of the anarchist safe havens appears to be centered in Paterson, New Jersey, so Montmorency, Farcett, and company go to America. Farcett, however, leaves right before a message concerning Maggie. The letter describes how she became sick and succumbed to a mysterious illness, later revealed to be radiation poisoning. A man named Bayfield houses Montmorency and company in their stay. Montmorency has a brief courtship with one of Bayfield's wife's friends. It ends when it is revealed that Montmorency is Tom's father. The anarchist plans in Italy and Britain end in failure, though Gaetano Bresci later succeeds in killing King Umberto. However, each of the characters is scarred emotionally. Farcett receives news of Maggie's death, right before he was about to set off to Tarimond to propose to her. Tom still does not know that Montmorency is his father. When Montmorency is receiving his congratulations from Lord Astleman, Lord George Fox-Selwyn is mysteriously missing. When Astleman is opening two crates from La Specola, the second is revealed to contain George's body, shot and delivered by none other than the curator of La Specola. He was working with the anarchists all along. Montmorency, in the last chapter of the book, vows revenge on Fox-Selwyn's murderer.

=== Montmorency's Revenge ===
The fourth book in the series was released in March 2007, and takes place about a year after the events of Montmorency and the Assassins. In this book, Montmorency heads to London to seek out those responsible for the death of Lord George Fox-Selwyn at the end of the previous book, assisted by George's nephew, Francis, taking on the disguise as Jack Scarper. Meanwhile, Robert Farcett, has become obsessed with cleaning after the death of Maggie Goudie on Tarimond. To assist Robert Farcett and protect Francis, Robert is sent to an asylum to be treated under the guise of Francis Fox-Selwyn, to throw off the terrorists. He is accompanied by Vi and her and Montmorency's son Tom, who finally learns the truth about his real father, Montmorency. After being attacked by one of the anarchists Montmorency is left near death and recovers slowly as the anarchists responsible for several assassinations, and George's death, flee to America. Montmorency and Jack (Frank) go to America, where they track down Moretti in a library, where he accidentally kills himself. Afterward, Montmorency asks for a hand in marriage. She says yes but Montmorency insists on writing down his life story, as he is doing so a man in a black cape walks into the room and Montmorency feels a gun against the back of his head.

=== Montmorency Returns ===
The fifth and final book in the series was released in 2013. It picks up immediately after the events of book four and chronicles the fallout from the events therein. Armitage blackmails Montmorency into serving as bait to lure Malpensa to New Jersey, forbidding him to relay the information that Malpensa is on the loose in America and not, as was previously thought, under lock and key in Scotland. Robert Farcett is also ensnared in Armitage's web of lies to serve to bait Malpensa and keep Montmorency in line, under the guise of studying the psychology of the local silk factory's Italian immigrant population. Montmorency's inability to explain the situation to his friends creates an emotional rift between them leading Tom to run away and explore the Canadian wilderness as an apprentice filmmaker, and pushes Mary away. Eventually, Montmorency makes an appearance in a parade to lure out Malpensa, who is killed. Montmorency and company return to London, enjoying a dinner party at Bargles where he catches up on family gossip, including the birth of Alex Fox-Selwyn's twins while continuing to hide his deep emotional turmoil. It is then revealed that Armitage has been intercepting his letters to Mary in order to prevent Montmorency from explaining himself and healing the rift in their relationship caused by events surrounding Malpensa. This leads to her wedding Bayfield, the owner of the silk factory. Montmorency elects not to intervene and leave her to a life in America. He receives an offer of work from an American Secret Service man named Fraser at Bargles and keeps it in mind for later, though he is leery of returning to America lest he cross paths with Armitage again. The novel closes out on Montmorency taking a tour of London to see how the city has changed in his absence and walking off down the street alone.

== Reception ==
The books have received positive reviews and won awards. Guardian reviewer Philip Ardagh described the Montmorency books as "rattling-good adventures [which] centre around the life of a Jekyll-and-Hyde thief who uses the sewers as an escape route".

== Publishing history ==
The novels have been translated into several languages, most recently Portuguese.

Audiobooks of the novels have been released in the UK from 2004, read by Stephen Fry and John Sessions.

== Theatrical adaptation ==
A professional theatre company, FreeRange Productions, adapted the novel for stage in 2012, performing at Edinburgh Festival Fringe through August of that year. The show was well received by critics and audiences, and Updale described it as "a nerve-wracking, but exciting experience".

== Awards ==
Montmorency and the Assassins was chosen as the "Best Book for Teenagers" by the New York Public Library.

- 2003 Nestlé Smarties Book Prize, silver runner-up in category 9- to 11-year-old readers, Montmorency
- 2004 Blue Peter Book Award, The Book I Couldn't Put Down, Montmorency
- Medway Award
- Southern Schools Book Award
