= Mick Manning =

British artist and creator of children's books

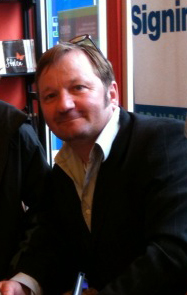
- Mick Manning at a signing session at Edinburgh Book festival
- Born: 1959 (age 66–67)
- Occupations: Artist and creator of children's books

Mick Manning (born 1959) is a British artist and creator of children's books.

== Biography ==
Manning was raised in Haworth, near Keighley, Yorkshire, England. He first attended Bradford College, then studied graphic design at the University of Northumbria and later Natural History Illustration at the Royal College of Art, where his tutors included John Norris Wood, Quentin Blake, and Sheila Robinson. In 1990 he devised and ran the BA honours Illustration option at the Glasgow School of Art as Course Leader. As an artist Manning is represented by Godfrey & Watt, and St Judes. Manning is a Fellow of the English Association. and in 2015, was awarded an Honorary Fellowship by Bradford College.

== Children's books ==
Manning is best known for his long-term collaboration as a writer and co-illustrator with his partner the illustrator and painter Brita Granström. In 1998, The Scotsman newspaper wrote, "Mick Manning and Brita Granström's approach to non-fiction for younger children has revolutionised our bookshelves."

== Awards and recognition ==
Manning and illustrator Brita Granström began making children's books together in 1993. Their first combined effort (The World Is Full of Babies) won the Smarties Silver Prize (years 0–5) in 1996.

Later recognitions include the Times Education Supplement Award; five Royal Society Junior Science Book prizes; and The English Association Non-Fiction Award (2000, 2005, 2008, 2011, 2014).

== Topics ==
The 2014 Royal Society Junior Science Book prizewinner book, Charlie's War Illustrated addressed some of the World War I experiences of Manning's grandfather. His book Tail End Charlie also addressed wartime adventures, this time featuring Manning's father.

The duo's book How Did I Begin was part of a controversy in 2011 when some segments of English society objected to literature aimed at pre-school children which included explicit explanations of how human conception occurs.
