= Lara Williamson =

Irish-born children's author

- Born: Northern Ireland
- Occupation: Children's writer
- Website: https://larawilliamson.com/index.html

Lara Williamson is an Irish-born children's author.

== Biography ==
Williamson was born and studied in Northern Ireland before moving to London. She worked for magazines including ELLE and New Woman, and was beauty editor at J-17.

== Writing ==
Her first two novels, A Boy Called Hope (2014) and The Boy Who Sailed the Ocean in an Armchair (2015) were published by Usborne and were shortlisted for the Waterstones Children's Book Prize and the Blue Peter Book Award respectively. They were followed by Just call me Spaghetti-Hoop Boy (2017) and The Girl with space in her heart (2019), while Midge and Mo (with illustrations by Becky Cameron) was published by Stripes in 2020 and was aimed at a younger readership.

== Published works ==
Title	Year	Publisher
A Boy Called Hope	2014	Usborne
The Boy Who Sailed the Ocean in an Armchair	2015	Usborne
Just call me Spaghetti-Hoop Boy	2017	Usborne
The Girl with space in her heart	2019	Usborne

=== For younger readers ===
Title	Year	Publisher
Midge and Mo (Illustrations by Becky Cameron)	2020	Stripes
