= Lyn Gardner =

British theatre critic

- Education: University of Kent
- Occupations: Theatre critic and children's writer

Lyn Gardner is a British theatre critic, children's writer, and journalist who contributes reviews and articles to The Stage and Stagedoor and has written for The Guardian.

== Theatre critic and educator ==
A graduate in drama and English from the University of Kent, Gardner was a founding member of the City Limits magazine, a cooperative for which she edited the theatre section. Later, she was a contributor to The Independent.

Gardner joined The Guardian as theatre critic in 1995, and remained on the paper for twenty-three years, taking a particular interest in fringe and more alternative theatre, while Michael Billington covered the most mainstream productions. Latterly, she was writing 130 reviews and 28,000 words of features annually, as well as 150 posts a year for an online blog for the paper, begun in 2008. The paper discontinued her blog in 2017, citing cost pressures, and the following year did not renew her contract.

Since June 2017 Gardner had been an associate editor of The Stage newspaper, where she continues to write her theatre blog. Gardner was also taken on to teach an MA in Dramatic Writing at Drama Centre London at Central Saint Martins.

== Children's writer ==
Gardner is a writer of children's novels, the earliest being Into the Woods (2006) and Out of the Woods (2010), both illustrated by Mini Grey and published by David Fickling Books. ISFDB catalogues it as the "Storm Eden" series.

She has written six further children's novels for Nosy Crow, known as the "Stage School Series", based on a young girl named Olivia attending Stage School. They have been well received, and a final seventh book was published in July 2013. The first in the series was Olivia's First Term.
