= Pete Johnson (author) =

British children's writer

Pete Johnson (born 29 April 1965) is a British children's writer with more than fifty books to his name. Inspired by the author, Dodie Smith – a fan letter led to a correspondence for over twenty years – his earlier books were for teenagers. But, his first breakout hit was The Ghost Dog in 1996; an eerie tale about the power of imagination which won both the Stockton Children's Book of the Year Award and The Young Telegraph Book of the Year. This book is still widely used in schools. Other horror stories followed including, The Creeper (2001) which also won The Stockton Children's Book of the Year Award and The Vampire Blog (2010) which won The Brilliant Book Award.

His anti-bullying novels Traitor (2002) and Avenger (2004) have also earned special praise and several prizes. Although, in more recent years, he achieved his greatest success with comedies such as, Trust me I’m a Troublemaker, 2005 winner of The Calerdale Children's Book Award and shortlisted for the Lincolnshire Young People's Award. Help I’m a Classroom Gambler (2006), winner of both The Sheffield and Leicester Children's Book Awards. And The Bad Spy’s Guide (2007) shortlisted for The Blue Peter Book Award (Book I couldn't put down category)

How to Train Your Parents (2003), his biggest international success, is now translated into twenty-nine languages. The lead character Louis the Laugh has since appeared in four stand-alone sequels. My Parents Are Out of Control (2013), shortlisted for The Roald Dahl Funny Prize. My Parents are Driving me Crazy (2015), How to Update Your Parents (2016) – which deals with the impact of the internet on family life and How to Fool Your Parents (2017).

He has also written best-selling comedies for Barrington Stoke, including, Diary of an (Un) Teenager (2004) and Awesome (2013).

Pete Johnson was made a Reading Champion by the Book Trust in recognition of all his work in promoting reading in schools and libraries. He lives near St Albans.

As part of celebrations marking twenty years of The Stockton Children's Book Award in March 2018, Pete Johnson has been invited to return – he is the first author to win this award and the only writer to win it twice.
