= Peter Hollindale =

Educationalist and literary critic

Peter Hollindale (born 1936) is an educationalist and literary critic. He taught at Derwent College, York from 1965 to 1999.

== Three levels of ideology ==
Hollindale's most renowned theory was that of the three levels of ideology in a text, which pertained to all four modern reading approaches (author-centred, reader-centred, text-centred, world-view-centred).

The levels are as follows:

1. The author's profound message in a text
2. The unexamined assumptions of the author
3. The ideologies of the author's world
