= Ben Lyttleton =

British author and journalist

- Occupations: Journalist, author

Ben Lyttleton is a British football journalist and author of news articles and books. He writes sports articles mainly for newspapers such as The Times and The Daily Telegraph and also authors and co-authors books about football-related topics.

Lyttleton has written books such as Twelve Yards: The Art & Psychology of the Perfect Penalty, and Edge: What Business Can Learn from Football, as well as a series of football-themed books for children, called Football School, with Alex Bellos, which were longlisted for the UKLA 2018 Book Award and shortlisted for the Blue Peter Book Award in 2017.

Lyttleton writes sports-related articles in news publications, including Time, The Guardian, Sports Illustrated, and FourFourTwo, as well as the Evening Standard, The Blizzard, Eurosport, Sky Sports The Daily Telegraph, The Scotsman, and So Foot.

He has appeared on the BBC's Beyond the Pitch podcast, As well as the BBC, Planet Fùtbol, Al Jazeera, Off the Ball, and ESPN.

He started by writing articles for Total Football, When Saturday Comes, and Football Italia magazines, and edited Football Espana.
