= School Library Association =

UK organization

Coordinates: 51.5791°N 1.76525°W

- Founded: 1937
- Type: Registered charity
- Registration no.: England & Wales (313660), Scotland (SC039453)
- Location: 1 Pine Court, Kembrey Park, Swindon SN2 8AD, UK
- Region served: Worldwide
- Website: sla.org.uk

The School Library Association (SLA) is an independent organization in the United Kingdom which promotes libraries and literacy in schools. The SLA was founded in 1937 and is based at Kembrey Park in north-eastern Swindon. It is a charity registered in England & Wales and Scotland.

It provides training and information to teachers and librarians, promotes the role of librarians in schools and publishes a range of titles including a quarterly journal, The School Librarian.

Regional branches operate in many areas of the UK https://www.sla.org.uk/branches

The Association's President is Richard Gerver. Past Presidents include authors Kevin Crossley-Holland (2012–2017) Gervase Phinn (2006–2009) and Aidan Chambers (2003–2006), and Miranda McKearney, Empathy Lab and Former Director of The Reading Agency.

Two chief executives of the association have been honoured for their services to education: Valerie Ann Fea (MBE) in the New Year Honours 1997 and Kathleen Amy Lemaire (OBE) in the New Year Honours 2008.

== Projects ==
In May 2007 the SLA launched a project in which it acted as facilitator for a Department for Children, Schools and Families (DCSF) initiative called Boys into Books 11–14, delivering 20 free books to all qualifying state schools in England with an accompanying reading guide. Boys into Books 5–11, a follow-up project funded by the DCSF, ran in 2008, also with a published reading guide.

A further DCSF-funded project in 2008, Book Ahead 0–7, was aimed at children in Early Years settings to promote enjoyment in reading at an early stage, with a reading guide written by Julia Eccleshare.

In 2010 the SLA ran the Everyone's Reading campaign in association with the DCSF, described by Children's Laureate Anthony Browne as "... a brilliant project encouraging the enjoyment of reading, a reading culture and a pleasure that will last throughout readers' lives."

== School Librarian of the Year Award ==
The SLA founded the School Librarian of the Year Award in 2004 to highlight best practice and innovation in school librarianship.

=== Winners ===
- 2005 — Anne Robinson (Nicholas Chamberlaine Technology College)
- 2006 — Anne-Marie Tarter (Ripon Grammar School)
- 2007 — Ingrid Hopson (George Abbot School)
- 2008 — Nikki Heath (Werneth School)
- 2009 — Lucy Bakewell (Hill West Primary School, Sutton Coldfield)
- 2010 — Kevin Sheehan (Offerton School) and Duncan Wright (Stewart's Melville College)
- 2011 — Carol Webb (Forest Hill School)
- 2012 — Adam Lancaster (Monk's Walk School)
- 2013 — Hilary Cantwell (St Paul's Community College, Waterford) and John Iona (Oasis Academy Enfield, London)
- 2014 — Liz Millett (Weatherfield Academy, Dunstable)
- 2015 — Annie Brady (St. Paul's CBS Secondary School, Dublin)
- 2016 — Amy McKay (Corby Business Academy)
- 2017 — Lucas Maxwell (Glenthorne High School)
- 2018 — Emma Suffield (St Wilfrid's Church of England Academy, Blackburn)
- 2019 — Ros Harding (The King's School Chester)
- 2020/21 - Kristabelle Williams of Addy and Stanhope School https://www.sla.org.uk/slya-2020

== Library Design Award and Inspiration Award ==
In 2011 the Association inaugurated the SLA Library Design Award to recognise innovation, creativity and resourcefulness in school library design. This was superseded in 2014 by the SLA Inspiration Award for "the school library space that shows inspiration, innovation, creativity and resourcefulness in its library design and in use".

=== Winners ===
- 2011 — Rosendale Primary School, London
- 2012 — The Duston School, Duston, Northampton
- 2013 — Carterton Community College, Oxfordshire
- 2014 — Oak Tree Primary School, Nottinghamshire (Primary School category); Dixons Allerton Academy, West Yorkshire (Secondary School category)
- 2015 — All Saints Primary School, Stibbard, Norfolk (Primary School category); Valley Park School, Maidstone, Kent (Secondary School category)
- 2017 — Adderley Primary School, Birmingham (Primary School category); American School of Madrid/Headington School/Hymers College (Secondary School category)

== Community and Enterprise Awards ==
These two awards were started in 2022 to recognise partnerships and projects benefitting school libraries. Winners due to be announced Autumn 2022.

== Information Book Award ==
In 2011 the Association inaugurated the SLA Information Book Award with shortlists in three categories, "designed to support school libraries, reinforce the importance of non-fiction and highlight the high standard of resources available".

=== Winners ===
- 2011 – How to Make a Universe with 92 Ingredients by Adrian Dingle (Scholastic, ISBN 9781407117911)
- 2012 – Can We Save the Tiger? by Martin Jenkins (Walker Books, ISBN 9781406319095)
- 2013 – Incredible Edibles by Stefan Gates, illustrated by Georgia Glynn (Walker Books, ISBN 9781406339062)
- 2014 – Get into Art: Animals by Susie Brooks (Kingfisher, ISBN 9780753435762)
- 2015 – Shackleton's Journey by William Grill (Flying Eye Books, ISBN 9781909263109)
- 2016 – The National Theatre by Marina McIntyre (Walker Books, ISBN 9781406358698)
- 2017 — Survivors of the Holocaust by Kath Shackleton, Zane Whittingham and Ryan Jones (Franklin Watts, ISBN 9781445150444)
- 2018 — Look I'm a Scientist by Various Authors (Dorling Kindersley, ISBN 9780241231074)
- 2019 – Politics for Beginners by Alex Frith, Rosie Hore, Louie Stowell and Kellan Stover (Usborne, ISBN 9781474922524)
- 2020 — Africa, Amazing Africa by Atinuke and Mouri Feddag (Walker Books, ISBN 9781406376586)
