= Jackanory =

British TV children's series (1965–1996)

- A title frame from the 1960s (top, the same font continued to be used throughout the 1970s)
- Genre: Children's television
- Created by: Joy Whitby
- Country of origin: United Kingdom
- Original language: English
- No. of episodes: 3640 (2330 missing)

Production
- Running time: 15 minutes

Original release
- Network: BBC1 (1965–96); CBBC (2006)
- Release: 13 December 1965 – 24 March 1996

Related
- Jackanory Playhouse; Jackanory Junior

Jackanory is a BBC children's television series which was originally broadcast between 1965 and 1996. It was designed to stimulate an interest in reading. The programme was first transmitted on 13 December 1965, and the first story was the fairy-tale "Cap-o'-Rushes" read by Lee Montague. Jackanory was broadcast until 1996, with around 3,650 episodes in its 30-year run.

The final story, The House at Pooh Corner by A. A. Milne, was read by Alan Bennett and broadcast on 24 March 1996. The programme was briefly revived on 27 November 2006 for two one-off stories. The format was revived as Jackanory Junior, airing on CBeebies between 2007 and 2009.

The programme's format, which varied little over the decades, featured an actor reading from children's novels or folk tales, usually while seated in an armchair. From time to time the scene being read would be illustrated by a specially commissioned still drawing, often by Quentin Blake. In 1983, Malou Bonicos was commissioned to provide illustrations for one Jackanory story. Usually a single book would occupy five daily fifteen-minute episodes, from Monday to Friday.

A spin-off series was Jackanory Playhouse (1972–85), which was a series of thirty-minute dramatisations. These included a dramatisation by Philip Glassborow of the comical A. A. Milne story "The Princess Who Couldn't Laugh".

Coverage of the live broadcast of the Apollo 8 mission in 1968 was interrupted so Jackanory could be shown.

== Title ==
The programme's title comes from an old English nursery rhyme:

I'll tell you a story
About Jack a Nory,
And now my story's begun;
I'll tell you another
Of Jack and his brother,
And now my story is done. (Note: In his novel Our Mutual Friend (1864–1865), Charles Dickens gives an alternative version in chapter 16: I’ll tell you a story Of Jack a Manory, And now my story’s begun; I’ll tell you another Of Jack and his brother, And now my story is done.)

The rhyme was first recorded in the publication The Top Book of All, for little Masters and Misses, which appeared about 1760.

== Revival ==
Title frame from the opening of The Magician of Samarkand, depicting the 2006 Jackanory logo

In November 2006 Jackanory briefly returned with the late comedian John Sessions as the revived programme's first narrator reading the Lord of the Rings parody Muddle Earth, written by Paul Stewart (and illustrator Chris Riddell). The second narrator was Sir Ben Kingsley, reading The Magician of Samarkand by Alan Temperley. They were broadcast in three 15-minute slots on CBBC and BBC One and later repeated in their entirety on BBC One on consecutive Sundays. The readings of Muddle Earth were heavily accompanied by animation and featured John Sessions speaking the lines of all the animated characters (and occasionally reading those of Joe whenever he was not on-screen), leading to criticism that the spirit of the original programme, a single voice telling a tale with minimal distractions, had been lost. (The original series had occasionally included dramatised material, in e.g. 1984's Starstormers by Nicholas Fisk and increasingly so towards the end of its run in 1996). The Magician of Samarkand was a similar production, albeit without the actors speaking additional lines; Ben Kingsley read both the story and the lines of all the characters. Both of these stories were produced and directed by Nick Willing.

Both stories were released in their entirety on DVD later that year, with added bonus features (galleries with images from the stories and a behind-the-scenes film for Muddle Earth).

While no further stories were made, Muddle Earth would be adapted for television again a few years later.

== Jackanory Junior ==
A version of Jackanory for younger children—called Jackanory Junior—was shown on CBeebies between 2007 and 2009. The CBeebies Bedtime Stories strand continues the tradition of well-known actors and personalities reading stories directly to camera.

Series 1
| Episode Number | Episode Name | Told by | Author | Illustrator |
|---|---|---|---|---|
| 01 | Bob and the House Elves | Lee Cornes | Emily Rodda | Tim Archbold |
| 02 | Ellie and the Cat | Tisha Martin | Malorie Blackman | Sue Mason |
| 03 | Fig's Giant | Art Malik | Geraldine McCaughrean | Jago |
| 04 | Jack and the Beanstalk | Nadine Marshall | Josephine Poole | Paul Hess |
| 05 | Crazy Camelot Capers | Kris Marshall | Tony Mitton | Arthur Robins |
| 06 | The Bun Gun | Amanda Abbington | Jeremy Strong | Ian Cunliffe |
| 07 | The Great Tug of War | Don Gilet | Beverley Naidoo | Piet Grobler |
| 08 | The King of Capri | Holly Aird | Jeanette Winterson | Jane Ray |
| 09 | The Last Polar Bears | Martin Clunes | Harry Horse | Harry Horse |
| 10 | The Mousehole Cat | Shobna Gulati | Antonia Barber | Nicola Bayley |
| 11 | The Princess and the Unicorn | Daniela Nardini | Wendy Blaxland | Arthur Robins |
| 12 | The Woman Who Won Things | Sophie Okonedo | Allan Ahlberg | Katharine McEwen |
| 13 | The Enormous Crocodile | Lenny Henry | Roald Dahl | Quentin Blake |

Series 2
| Episode Number | Episode Name | Told by | Author | Illustrator |
|---|---|---|---|---|
| 14 | The Gruffalo and Room on the Broom | Sanjeev Bhaskar | Julia Donaldson | Alex Scheffler |
| 15 | Shampoozel | Jo Brand | Laurence Anholt | Arthur Robins |
| 16 | The Crucial Plan and Da Bag-a-Bling | Lenny Henry | Michael De Souza and Genevieve Webster | Michael De Souza and Genevieve Webster |
| 17 | The Last Cowboys | Martin Freeman | Harry Horse | Harry Horse |
| 18 | Harold and the Duck | Sheridan Smith | Bruce Robinson | Sophie Windham |
| 19 | The Monster Crisp Guzzler | Angela Griffin | Malorie Blackman | Sami Sweeten |
| 20 | Let's Go Home, Little Bear | Ramon Tikaram | Martin Waddell | Barbara Firth |
| 21 | The Twelve Dancing Princesses | Rupert Penry-Jones | Jane Ray | Jane Ray |
| 22 | Dimity Dumpty and Jethro Byrde | Sally Hawkins | Bob Graham | Bob Graham |
| 23 | The Toad Prince | Dervla Kirwan | Rebecca Lisle | Tim Archbold |
| 24 | The Snow Dragon | Adrian Lester | Vivian French | Chris Fisher |
| 25 | Explorer Trauma | Tamsin Greig | Sue Mongredien | Teresa Murfin |
| 26 | The Owl Who Was Afraid of the Dark | Alun Armstrong | Jill Tomlinson | Paul Howard |

== Stories ==
See List of Jackanory episodes for the stories broadcast from 13 December 1965 to 9 March 1984.

Subsequent stories included:

- The Lightkeepers (1983), read by Andrew Burt
- The Dangerous Journey (1983), read by Andrew Burt
- The Wheel on the School, written by Meindert DeJong, read by Peter Settelen
- Arabel's Tree House, written by Joan Aiken, read by Bernard Cribbins
- The Hundred and One Dalmatians, written by Dodie Smith, read by Sarah Greene
- Matilda, written by Roald Dahl, read by Victoria Wood
- George's Marvellous Medicine written by Roald Dahl, read by Rik Mayall

== List of readers ==
- Joss Ackland (5 programmes reading Danny, the Champion of the World)
- Tom Baker
- Floella Benjamin
- Alan Bennett
- George Benson
- Ed Bishop
- James Bolam
- Helena Bonham Carter (5 programmes reading Philippa Pearce's The Way to Sattin Shore stories)
- Richard Briers
- Kathy Burke
- Andrew Burt
- Earl Cameron
- Brian Cant
- Prince Charles (now King Charles III, reading his own book, The Old Man of Lochnagar)
- Matthew Corbett
- Bernard Cribbins (114 programmes)
- Peter Davison
- Angus Deayton
- Judi Dench
- Denholm Elliott
- Rupert Everett
- Harry Fowler
- Edward Fox
- Jan Francis
- Clement Freud
- Ann George
- John Grant (55 programmes reading his Littlenose stories)
- Joyce Grenfell
- Susan Hampshire
- Sheila Hancock
- Susanne Hart
- Cyd Hayman
- Lenny Henry
- John Hurt
- Wendy Hiller
- Michael Hordern
- Jeremy Irons
- Martin Jarvis
- Stratford Johns
- Freddie Jones
- James Robertson Justice
- Penelope Keith
- Ben Kingsley (The Magician of Samarkand)
- Roy Kinnear
- Rosalind Knight
- Raymond Leppard
- Arthur Lowe
- Joanna Lumley
- Sylvester McCoy
- Geraldine McEwan
- Paul McGann
- Ian McKellen
- Art Malik
- Alfred Marks
- Alex Marshall (1969–1974)
- Trevor Martin
- Rik Mayall (reading George's Marvellous Medicine)
- George Melly
- Paul Merton
- Spike Milligan
- Hayley Mills
- Lee Montague
- Patrick Moore
- Liam Neeson
- Michael Palin
- Jon Pertwee
- Alison Prince
- Ted Ray
- Miranda Richardson
- Alan Rickman
- Bob Roberts
- Tony Robinson
- Gordon Rollings
- Patsy Rowlands
- Willie Rushton
- Margaret Rutherford
- Prunella Scales
- John Sessions (Muddle Earth)
- Elaine Smith
- Maggie Smith
- Patrick Stewart
- John Stride
- Elaine Stritch
- Mollie Sugden
- H. E. Todd
- Patrick Troughton
- Ann Way
- Mary Webster
- Billie Whitelaw
- Kenneth Williams (69 programmes)
- Victoria Wood (reading the Ten in a Bed story and Matilda by Roald Dahl)
- Wendy Wood (Auntie Gwen)
- Mai Zetterling
- Mark McManus (5 programmes)

== Cultural influence ==
Philip Glenister, in character as Gene Hunt, made an appearance on Jackanory as the guest reader in the Ashes to Ashes series 2 finale, set in 1982, which Alex Drake (Keeley Hawes) imagines being transmitted to her television set.

"Jackanory Stories" is a song by the band Television Personalities, released on the album ...And Don't the Kids Just Love It.

Jackanory is mentioned in the Blur song "Country House", in the line "Everything's going Jackanory", and in the Elastica song "Annie", in the lines "And Mister Murphy / Likes his Jackanory", both released in 1995.

"Jackanory, jackanory" said by someone in the sing-song tones of the theme tune indicates that they think that someone else is making up or "stretching" a story, i.e. lying.

In 2013 the UK TV Network Dave launched Crackanory as an adult version of Jackanory. Each Crackanory episode features two 15-minute tales narrated by contemporary comedians and actors, containing a mix of live-action and animation as per the original.
