= Barnaby Grimes =

Book series by Paul Stewart and Chris Riddell

The Barnaby Grimes series is written by Paul Stewart and Chris Riddell, and follows the title character of Grimes the "tick-tock lad" (a young courier messenger specialising on very fast deliveries, as he takes the most direct route over the rooftops) and his various adventures - mostly with a supernatural spin to them.

== Setting ==
The fictional city in which the action takes place is never mentioned by name, but it appears to be rather large, with several named neighborhoods and areas;

- Hartley Square - Much like the real world's Harley Street in London, the Square contains the offices and surgeries of the wealthiest and most well-connected doctors and medical practitioners in the fictional city. The Square itself is described in Curse of the Night Wolf as "great marble-stepped mansions forming a square around an exclusive park".
- The Wasps' Nest - A series of very old slums in various levels of decay, the buildings and people crammed together tightly. Called the Wasps' Nest because of the "swarm" of thieves and killers that call it home. Described in Curse of the Night Wolf as "crumbling brick buildings, underground tunnels and attic rat runs linking one to the other to form a vast three-dimensional labyrinth through which its occupants buzzed and scurried". Known streets in the area include Beale Terrace, Seed Row, and Spieler Lane
- Riverhythe - The main port of the city, a natural inlet of the river that was recently refurbished to accommodate more ships. Both the bank and river bed have been excavated and strengthened with a brick lining.

The series seems to take place in England during the late Georgian era, with much use of historical slang and reference to various fashions and conventions of the time. This time period is further confirmed in Phantom of Blood Alley with the advent of early experiments in photography being central to the plot. The city has a clearly defined rich/poor divide, with opulent town-houses and offices to the East, and factories and poor slums to the West of the city.

== Themes and style ==
The story is narrated by the hero, with a spin to it that suggests he is telling the tale from the perspective of a long while afterward. The reader gets the sense that Grimes is a very busy character, as he refers to separate adventures happening during lulls in the current escapade, where other writers might simply use phrases like "two weeks later..." etc.

The series mainly follows the formula of a mystery, leading to a supernatural horror twist when the hero discovers the evil behind the mystery. Supernatural elements seem to be common in Barnaby's fictional world, although they are rarely referred to by other characters, suggesting that this is not common knowledge.

== Notable characters ==
- Will Farmer - A young tick-tock lad who Barnaby has taken on as a sort of apprentice, teaching him the ways of highstacking. Still nervous about difficult moves, but keen and quick to learn. He seems to idolize Barnaby and has even moved into the same boarding house as him.
- Tom Flint - Quite famous amongst tick-tock lads, he was one of the greatest "highstackers" (roof acrobats) of his time. He taught Barnaby the art of highstacking but died shortly before the canon by breaking his neck. Still mentioned often by Grimes.
- Professor Pinkerton-Barnes - Known as "PB" to his friends, he is an eminent zoologist and good friend of Grimes. He is rather eccentric, sending Grimes to collect information related to various unusual theories. Even if Grimes' data disproves his theories (which it often does), the Professor is pleased, as he states that "theories are there to be disproved...How else are we to make scientific progress?". The character is unique in that he is the only supporting character to appear in every book of the series (so far).

== Books in the series ==
- Barnaby Grimes: Curse of the Night Wolf (2007)
- Barnaby Grimes: Return of the Emerald Skull (2008)
- Barnaby Grimes: Legion of the Dead (2008)
- Barnaby Grimes: Phantom Of Blood Alley (2009)

== See also ==
- Paul Stewart
- Chris Riddell
