= Pirate Diary =

Children's book by Richard Platt

- First edition
- Author: Richard Platt
- Illustrator: Chris Riddell
- Cover artist: Riddell
- Language: English
- Series: Diary books by Platt and two illustrators
- Genre: Children's historical fiction, picture book
- Publisher: Walker Books
- Publication date: 8 October 2001
- Publication place: United Kingdom
- Pages: 64 pp
- ISBN: 978-0-7445-6233-0
- OCLC: 47676616
- LC Class: PZ7.P71295 Pi 2001
- Preceded by: Castle Diary
- Followed by: Egyptian Diary

Pirate Diary: The Journal of Jake Carpenter is an account of the pirate life cast as the journal of a young cabin boy, written by Richard Platt and illustrated by Chris Riddell. It was published by Walker Books in 2001, two years after Castle Diary, also by Platt and Riddell. Platt continued the "Diary" series with illustrator David Parkins.

Pirate Diary received the annual Kate Greenaway Medal from the professional librarians, recognising the year's best-illustrated children's book published in the U.K. (Riddell), and the Blue Peter Book Award, Best Book with Facts. It was also silver runner up for the Nestlé Smarties Book Prize in ages category 6–8 years.

The Greenaway press release celebrated Pirate Diary as an "exciting information book for children from 8 to 14" and the first "information book" to win the illustration Medal since 1975, and called it "a fictionalised account" (quoting CILIP). "[W]hen he spoke with author Richard Platt the harsh necessities of historical accuracy came into play. 'Everything I got excited about got shot down. No parrots, eye-patches or wooden legs. Thank god there were weapons and amputations!'" (quoting Riddell).

== Diary series ==
The Diary series comprises four 64-page picture books that publisher Walker Books labels "Non-Fiction". Author Platt calls them fictional first-person journals (see diary) and calls Castle Diary "my first attempt at fiction".

- Castle Diary: The Journal of Tobias Burgess, Page; Transcribed by Richard Platt, Illustrated by Chris Riddell (Walker, 1999)

subtitle Journal of a Young Page in the 2011 paperback set
a boy who goes to work in a castle as a page

Castle Diary was a highly commended runner up for the Greenaway Medal, recognising Riddell's illustration. (Note: Today there are usually eight books on the Greenaway shortlist. According to CCSU, some runners up through 2002 were Commended (from 1959) or Highly Commended (from 1974). There were 31 highly commended runners up in 29 years including Riddell and Lauren Child in 1999.)

PZ7.P71295 Cas 1999 http://lccn.loc.gov/98042779
Castle Diary in libraries (WorldCat catalog) (first US)

- Pirate Diary: The Journal of Jake Carpenter (Walker, 2001)

subtitle Journal of a Cabin Boy in the 2011 paperback set
an apprentice sailor, impressed by pirates as a cabin boy

Platt won the Blue Peter Award, Best Book with Facts, and Riddell won the Greenaway Medal for illustration.

PZ7.P71295 Pi 2001 http://lccn.loc.gov/00065198
Pirate Diary in libraries (WorldCat catalog) (first US)

- Egyptian Diary: The Journal of Nakht (Walker, 2005)

subtitle Journal of a Young Scribe in the 2011 paperback set
the third first-person journal, a whodunit featuring corruption and robbery
PZ7.P71295 Eg 2005 http://lccn.loc.gov/2005046911
Egyptian Diary in libraries (WorldCat catalog) (first US)

- Roman Diary: The Journal of Iliona of Mytilini, who was captured and sold as a slave in Rome, AD 107 (Walker, 2009)

subtitle Journal of a Young Slave in the 2011 paperback set
a Greek girl taken by pirates for sold in Rome; "fourth and final book in the Diary series"
PZ7.P71295 Rom 2009 http://lccn.loc.gov/2008935660
Roman Diary in libraries (WorldCat catalog) (first US)

Walker re-issued all four books March 2011 in a matching set with anonymous subtitles, classified as "Non-Fiction", and recommended for readers age 7 and up.
