= The Last of the Sky Pirates =

2002 novel by Paul Stewart and Chris Riddell

- Author: Paul Stewart, Chris Riddell
- Illustrator: Chris Riddell
- Cover artist: First edition
- Language: English
- Series: The Edge Chronicles
- Genre: Children's, Fantasy
- Publisher: Doubleday
- Publication date: 1 September 2002
- Publication place: United Kingdom
- Media type: Print (hardback and paperback)
- Pages: 384
- ISBN: 978-0-385-60200-6
- OCLC: 59501135
- Preceded by: Midnight Over Sanctaphrax
- Followed by: Vox

The Last of the Sky Pirates is a children's fantasy novel by Paul Stewart and Chris Riddell, first published in 2002. It is the fifth volume of The Edge Chronicles and the first of the Rook Saga trilogy; within the stories' own chronology it is the seventh novel, following the Quint Saga and Twig Saga trilogies.

Unlike the previous books in the series, this focuses on Rook Barkwater and Felix Lodd, but the main character of the first three books, Twig, is present as well. The story is of young Rook as he becomes a librarian knight and is pitted against the Guardians of the Night, including Xanth Filantine. The character of Vox Verlix is mentioned, setting up for the sixth book, Vox.

== Plot summary ==
Rook Barkwater lives in the network of sewer-chambers beneath Undertown, in which a society of librarians has established itself, secretly opposing the cruel Guardians of Night. Rook, a lowly under-librarian, dreams of becoming a librarian knight—one of the select few to travel into the Deepwoods and gather information which may lead to the discovery of the cure to stone-sickness (an affliction which has destroyed the buoyant rocks, making skysailing impossible). Rook does not expect his dreams ever to come true—his best friend, Felix Lodd, seems a much more likely candidate—but, to everyone's surprise, Rook is chosen to be a knight, along with Stob Lummus and Magda Burlix.

Rook, Magda and Stob make their way along the Great Mire Road, a shryke-controlled bridge that has been built to traverse the marshy Mire in place of sky ships. While on the way, Rook helps an imprisoned sky pirate, Deadbolt Vulpoon, to escape. Finally, the librarian knights arrive in the Eastern Roost, a large shryke-city. Employing the help of a male shryke, Hekkle, who is friendly to the librarians, the three make their way across the Deepwoods, eventually arriving at the Free Glades.

After arriving there, Rook, Stob and Magda are joined by Xanth Filatine, a disguised Guardian of Night who is secretly channelling information to the Guardians so that they may ambush the librarian knights as they travel. During Rook's studies, he learns to create a skycraft, which is a small, flying one-person vehicle. Xanth breaks his leg in a skycraft accident, and cannot embark upon his treatise-voyage, the journey for which the knights have been studying. Rook also makes a raid on the Foundry Glade, along with Felix Lodd's sister Varis Lodd (who saved Rook from slavers when he was very young) and the slaughterer Knuckle. The purpose of this raid is to free the banderbear slaves that are kept there. During this raid, Rook takes a poisoned arrow to the chest to save a banderbear's life.

Rook embarks on his treatise-voyage. His goal is to find the Great Convocation of Banderbears. Rook befriends a young banderbear named Wumeru, and he follows her, against her will, to the Convocation. The banderbears discover his presence and are about to kill him when the banderbear who Rook saved in the Foundry Glade stands up for him. Rook is then introduced to Twig, the main character and sky pirate from the second Edge Chronicles trilogy, now an old man. Twig reveals that his sky ship, the Skyraider, has not yet succumbed to stone-sickness. Along with a crew of banderbears, the two set out to attack the fortress of the Guardians of Night: the Tower of the same name. Their purpose is to free Cowlquape Pentephraxis, an old friend of Twig's.

While Twig and the Skyraider keep the Guardians busy, Rook sneaks into the tower on his skycraft and frees Cowlquape. As he is about to fly free, a rope becomes snagged and the skycraft is stuck. Xanth, the traitor, confronts Rook. The two had become good friends during their time together in the Free Glades, a fact that Xanth apparently had not forgotten. Xanth cuts the rope quickly, allowing Rook to fly away safely with Cowlquape.

The Skyraider, meanwhile, had succumbed to stone-sickness, and was slowly dropping over the Edge. Rook and Cowlquape mourn the end of Twig, who had been struck by the crossbow-bolt of the chief guardian of night, Orbix Xaxis and had decided to go down with his ship. However, at the last minute, Twig's caterbird, who had sworn to watch over him for always, catches him and flies towards the rejuvenating waters of Riverrise. Whether they make it in time is left as a cliffhanger.

== Characters ==
- Rook Barkwater
- Felix Lodd
- Stob Lumnus
- Magda Burlix
- Deadbolt Vulpoon
- Hekkle
- Xanth Filatine
- Knuckle
- Varis Lodd
- Twig
- Orbix Xaxis

== Reception ==
The Last of the Sky Pirates has been commended for the way it portrays librarians. It has been reviewed by Horn Book, and School Library Journal.
