= Clarice Bean series =

Children's book series

The Clarice Bean series is a series of children's books written and illustrated by English author Lauren Child from 1999. The stories follow schoolgirl Clarice Bean Tuesday and her challenges navigating the complex ethical, social and philosophical questions children deal with at school and at home, accompanied by friendship drama and mystery solving. A spin-off series titled Ruby Redfort, which the US publisher called a "six-book middlegrade fiction series" in advance, was created in 2011.

== Books ==
- Clarice Bean, That's Me (Orchard Books, 1999)
- My Uncle Is a Hunkle, Says Clarice Bean (Orchard Books, September 2001)
- Clarice Bean, Guess Who's Babysitting? (Candlewick Press, March 2001) —an adaptation of My Uncle Is a Hunkle for the U.S. market
- What Planet Are You From, Clarice Bean? (Orchard Books, 2001)
- Utterly Me, Clarice Bean (Orchard Books, 2002)
- Clarice Bean Spells Trouble (Orchard Books, 2004)
- Clarice Bean, Don't Look Now (Orchard Books, 2006)
- Clarice Bean: Think Like an Elf (Orchard Books, 2021)
- Clarice Bean: Scram! (Orchard Books, 2022)
- Clarice Bean: Smile (HarperCollins Books, 2024)

== Awards and nominations ==
Both Clarice Bean, That's Me and What Planet Are You From, Clarice Bean? were bronze medal winners of the Smarties Prize, in the 6–8 years category, in 1999, and in 2001, respectively. The latter won the Kids Club category. Clarice Bean, That's Me was also a highly commended runner-up for the Kate Greenaway Medal, the annual British Library Association award for children's book illustration. (Note: Today there are usually eight books on the Greenaway Medal shortlist. According to CCSU, some runners-up through 2002 were Commended (from 1959) or Highly Commended (from 1974). There were 31 highly commended runners-up in 29 years including Lauren Child and Chris Riddell in 1999.) Clarice Bean Spells Trouble made the shortlists for both the British Children's Book of the Year and the Red House Children's Book Award.

== Characters ==
The Tuesday Family: Clarice Bean's family consists of: Clarice Bean Tuesday (aged 7 in "Clarice Bean, That's me"), Minal Cricket Tuesday (her younger brother), who is a "maggot", Marcie Tuesday (her older sister), Kurt Tuesday (her older brother), her father, her mother, her grandfather, and her grandmother.

Betty P. Moody: Betty Moody is Clarice Bean's best friend, and they do most things together. Clarice and Betty both love the Ruby Redfort series. Betty also loves dogs, and in the first book she received a dog from Clarice's grandad's best friend. She appears in the series wearing glasses. She and her parents, who Clarice refers to as 'call-me-Mol' and 'call-me-Cecil', travelled a lot. In the last book, she moves to San Francisco because call-me-Mol goes to California for a vacation, but finds a job and decides to stay there.

Karl Wrenbury: Karl is the son of a single mother. His dad ran away when he was younger. He is featured at first as an enemy and later as a friend. He is very good with dogs, and helps train Grandad and their dog Cement's manners. He is a trouble maker and always gets into trouble with Mrs. Wilberton, their class schoolteacher. He is often sent to Mr. Pickering's office for his bad behavior. In one of the books, he throws his chair across the room.

Grace Grapello: Grace is Clarice Bean's worst enemy. She is often very mean to Clarice for no particular reason, especially about her spelling. She is good at just about everything and people say she is the teacher's pet. Mrs. Wilberton never believes Clarice Bean and always believes Grace.

Mrs. Wilberton: Mrs. Wilberton is Clarice Bean's Teacher. She does not seem to be particularly nice and is always telling Clarice off about her spelling. Clarice Bean describes Mrs. Wilberton as having a "honking goose voice" and "a big derriere". She also possesses a gait which Clarice Bean and Karl describe as "walking on trotters", and which Karl often impersonates.

Clem Hansson: Clem is a new girl at Clarice Bean's school. She is from Sweden and has a pet rabbit called Kahneen, which is Swedish for rabbit. Clarice describes Clem as Sadie Blanch, a fictional character from the Ruby Redfort series.

Czarina: Czarina is Clarice Bean's drama teacher who is going to have a baby.

== Book within the book ==
An important plot device is the Ruby Redfort collection, a series of fictional books in which Clarice Bean and Betty Moody frequently find inspiration. They are about a young, American girl, who is an undercover secret agent. In Clarice Bean Spells Trouble, Clarice and Betty also watch the Ruby Redfort television series, which was adapted from the books. In Utterly Me, Clarice Bean, it is revealed that Hollywood are adapting it into a film. There are nine books in the Ruby Redfort series:

- There Was a Girl Called Ruby
- Run For It, Ruby
- Where in the World Are You, Ruby Redfort?
- R U 4 Real, Ruby Redfort?
- Run Ruby Run
- Who Will Rescue Ruby Redfort?
- Ruby Redfort Saves the Day
- Ruby Redfort Rules
- Rush to Russia Ruby

The fictional author is Patricia F Maplin Stacey, whom Betty actually meets in Russia, where she gets a Ruby Redfort book signed. In another book, Clarice gets to be in a movie starring "Skyler Summer" as Ruby Redfort.

Hitch is a character in the Ruby Redfort series. He is the Redfort family butler. He is the only one in the Redfort household that is aware that Ruby is a secret agent. Hitch often helps Ruby escape from tricky situations.

Lauren Child contracted to begin a real Ruby Redfort series in autumn 2011. As of 2022, the Ruby Redfort series has concluded with 6 instalments.

== Ruby Redfort Books ==
The Ruby Redfort books are now actual books and there are six in the series. These include:

- 1 Ruby Redfort: Look into My Eyes
- 2 Ruby Redfort: Take Your Last Breath
- 3 Ruby Redfort: Catch Your Death
- 4 Ruby Redfort: Feel the Fear
- 5 Ruby Redfort: Pick Your Poison
- 6 Ruby Redfort: Blink and You Die
