= Hugo Pepper =

2006 children's book by Paul Stewart

- Author: Paul Stewart
- Illustrator: Chris Riddell
- Language: English
- Series: Far-Flung Adventures
- Genre: Children's
- Publisher: Doubleday
- Publication date: 6 April 2006
- Publication place: United Kingdom
- Pages: 272 pp
- ISBN: 978-0-385-60725-4
- OCLC: 62796278
- Preceded by: Corby Flood

Hugo Pepper is a 2006 children's book written by Paul Stewart and illustrated by Chris Riddell. It won the Nestlé Children's Book Prize Silver Award and was longlisted for the Carnegie Medal.

== Plot introduction ==
This story is set in the same world as Fergus Crane and Corby Flood. It stars Hugo Pepper, a young boy who was raised by reindeer herders after his parents were eaten by polar bears. When Hugo discovers that his parents' sled has a very special compass which can be set to 'Home', he sets off to find where his true home is. As he does this, he unravels the mystery of The Firefly Quarterly's Institute disaster and the treasure of his great-great-grandmother, Brimstone Kate.
