= Beyond the Deepwoods =

1998 novel by Paul Stewart and Chris Riddell

- First edition
- Author: Paul Stewart, Chris Riddell
- Illustrator: Chris Riddell
- Language: English
- Genre: Children's, Fantasy
- Publisher: Doubleday
- Publication date: 1 October 1998
- Publication place: United Kingdom
- Media type: Print (Hardback & Paperback)
- Pages: 224
- ISBN: 0-385-40967-2
- OCLC: 42274574
- Preceded by: The Clash of the Sky Galleons
- Followed by: Stormchaser

Beyond the Deepwoods is a children's fantasy novel by Paul Stewart and Chris Riddell, first published in 1998. It is the first volume of The Edge Chronicles and of the Twig Saga trilogy.

== Plot ==
Raised by woodtrolls in the Deepwoods all his life, Twig believes he is one of them, yet strongly suspects there is something different about him, as he does not fit in with them; in particular, he feels a longing to live as a sky pirate. He sets off to find his true kind when he learns from his adoptive woodtroll mother that he is not a woodtroll after all, but was found abandoned in the woods and taken in by them. His adoptive mother tells him to travel to their cousin's house to mull things over, but during Twig's journey through the Deepwoods, he ends up unintentionally straying from the path. This is an act no woodtroll ever commits, for the woodtrolls' greatest fear is getting lost, and this fear is not without reason. The forest is populated with both fierce natural predators and evil demons, the most dangerous being the Gloamglozer. Twig soon stumbles upon a slaughterer who is being attacked by a hover worm. Twig kills the hover worm and the grateful slaughterer invites him to spend the night in his village.

The next morning, Twig is woken by a slaughterer who tells him that he has outstayed his welcome, and is expected to leave immediately, which he does. Twig has a run-in with a skullpelt, a predator which hunts people who fall under the illusions of the Deepwoods' lullabee trees, but is saved by a caterbird which has just hatched from its cocoon. As all caterbirds share telepathic dreams whilst in the womb, and the oakelf sage of Twig's woodtroll village lived in a caterbird cocoon, this caterbird knows all about Twig. The caterbird tells Twig his destiny lies "beyond the Deepwoods" and flies off, promising to return when he is in danger. That night, Twig is almost eaten by a bloodoak, a man-eating tree, but escapes and ends up in a gyle goblin colony, where he is almost fed to the goblins by their leader, the Grossmother. After a gyle goblin guides him to safety, Twig meets an injured banderbear, one of the forest's dominant predators. The banderbear is sick because of a rotten tooth, which Twig pulls out. Soon, Twig and the banderbear become great friends, but one day the banderbear is killed by a swarm of wig-wigs, ferocious predators which act like piranhas. Later, Twig almost drowns in a swamp, but is rescued by a flathead goblin who vanishes before Twig can thank him. Twig meets a young girl who takes him as a "pet" in the underground society of the termagant trogs. Twig spends a few months with the trog girl, but eventually she undergoes the termagant trogs' maturation ceremony by drinking sap from a bloodoak root, turning her into a monstrous brute like the other adult female trogs. However, a lone trog male saves Twig, much to his surprise, and directs him to the exit.

Twig finally meets some sky pirates, whose ship has crashed due to the flight-rock which powers the ship falling out of the sky when it was struck by lightning, and helps them repair it. When their captain Cloud Wolf, whose real name is Quintinius Verginix, tells a story about his past, Twig realizes that Quintinius is his true father, and wants to join his crew. To Twig's horror, though, the next morning he awakens alone, abandoned by his father again. Distraught, Twig realizes the pirates' campfire has started a forest fire. Twig runs for his life and ends up in the Edgelands on the outskirts of the Deepwoods, where he meets the Gloamglozer face to face. The Gloamglozer tempts Twig into living a life as a Gloamglozer himself, having failed to fit in anywhere else, and reveals that he had been influencing Twig's journey all along in the guise of a slaughterer, gyle goblin, male trog and flathead goblin. However, when Twig agrees, the Gloamglozer instead throws him off the side of the Edge. The caterbird returns and rescues Twig before dropping him onto the deck of Quintinius Verginix's ship. Finally reunited with his true father, who apologizes for leaving him and promises to always protect him, Twig and the sky pirates set sail.

== Publication history ==
Chris Riddell says that "...the books I loved as a child always had intriguing maps in the front of them... But I always wanted to know what lay beyond the edges of the map – where the heffalumps were, over the Northern Mountains or across the sea to the West. So I drew a world that was, literally, on the Edge, and asked Paul to imagine what happened there." Paul Stewart decided to set the first book in an area of the map called the Deepwoods. He was heavily inspired by Grimm's fairy tales, by natural history, and by Riddell's artwork.

== Critical reception ==
Beyond the Deepwoods was received warmly by critics, who praised its originality, creative language, and artwork. PublishersWeekly said, "The narrative will cast a spell over readers from the beginning with its utterly odd, off-kilter sense of logic and a vocabulary that is equal parts Dr. Seuss and Lewis Carroll"; Kirkus Reviews said, "Good fun, though the supporting cast tends to overshadow the plot."

== Sources ==
- Paul Stewart (1998) Beyond the Deepwoods
