= Slaughterer =

Slaughterer may refer to:

- One who works in a slaughterhouse
- Shochet (lit. "slaughterer"), in Judaism, one who performs shechita, the ritual slaughter of animals for food

== See also ==
- Animal slaughter, agricultural practice
- Butcher, professions involved in culinary meat production, including animal slaughter
- The Slaughterer's Quest, a series of short stories in The Edge Chronicles
