= Freeglader =

2004 novel by Paul Stewart and Chris Riddell

- Author: Paul Stewart, Chris Riddell
- Illustrator: Chris Riddell
- Cover artist: First edition
- Language: English
- Series: The Edge Chronicles
- Genre: Children's, Fantasy
- Publisher: Doubleday
- Publication date: 2 September 2004
- Publication place: United Kingdom
- Pages: 389
- ISBN: 978-0-385-60462-8
- OCLC: 56642155
- Preceded by: Vox
- Followed by: The Immortals

Freeglader is a children's fantasy novel by Paul Stewart and Chris Riddell, first published in 2004. It is the seventh volume of The Edge Chronicles and the third of the Rook Saga trilogy; within the stories' own chronology it is the ninth novel, following the Quint Saga and Twig Saga trilogies.

== Plot summary ==
Freeglader starts in the capital of the Edge, Undertown. The city is slowly being destroyed by a dark maelstrom, triggered by Vox Verlix. The Undertowners begin a mass exodus, fleeing to a new life in a vast, beautiful area of justice and equality, the Free Glades. The exodus is led by Rook Barkwater, the hero of the story, and the others in a breakaway group of academics known as the librarian knights. On the journey to the Free Glades Rook gets caught up in a storm near the Twilight Woods, causing him to lose his memory. Upon reaching the Deepwoods the exodus is attacked by the recently hatched battle flocks of Shrykes. Only through the timely arrival of the Freeglade Lancers are the Librarians and Undertowners saved (combined with Xanth killing the Roost mother). Meanwhile, Amberfuce has reached the Foundry Glade. There he presents his partner with plans for Glade Eaters, special weapons designed by Vox Verlix. The two along with the Goblin Nations begin plans for an attack on the Free Glades. Rook, meanwhile having regained his memory, joins the Free Lancers. Xanth, his name cleared, joins the Librarian Knights. Everything is peaceful for several months until the attack comes. The massive Glade Eaters, backed by the armies of the Goblin Nations, destroy most of the Free Glades before being destroyed. The Sky Pirates, the Librarian Knights, the Freeglade Lancers and the Ghosts of Screetown fight determinedly but are outnumbered. Even the arrival of the banderbears fails to turn the tide. However, at the last minute large numbers of peaceful goblins revolt, killing the Goblin Chieftains. The war ends, and everyone sets about rebuilding the Free Glades.

== Main characters ==
- Xanth Filatine
- Magda Burlix
- Felix Lodd
- Fenbrus Lodd
- Varis Lodd

== Reception ==
Carolyn Phelan writing for Booklist said it was a good conclusion to the series that, "fans wouldn't want to miss." Kathleen Isaacs also thought it a good end to the series praising its, "complex and well-worked-out fantasy world."

== Sources ==
- Stewart, Paul (2004) Freeglader
