= The Emperor of Absurdia =

- First edition
- Author: Chris Riddell
- Illustrator: Chris Riddell
- Language: English
- Genre: Children's
- Publisher: Macmillan
- Publication date: 31 August 2006
- Publication place: United Kingdom
- Pages: 32 pp
- ISBN: 978-1-4050-5061-6
- OCLC: 225236032
- Dewey Decimal: 823.914 22
- LC Class: MLCL 2006/40109

The Emperor of Absurdia is a children's picture book written and illustrated by Chris Riddell, published in 2006. It won the Nestlé Children's Book Prize Silver Award and was shortlisted for the Kate Greenaway Medal.
