= Composite Creatures =

2021 novel by Caroline Hardaker

- First edition cover
- Author: Caroline Hardaker
- Cover artist: Rohan Eason
- Language: English
- Genres: Science fiction
- Publisher: Angry Robot
- Publication date: 13 April 2021
- Publication place: United Kingdom
- Media type: Trade paperback
- Pages: 400
- ISBN: 978-0-85766-902-5

Composite Creatures is a science fiction novel by English poet and novelist Caroline Hardaker. It is her debut novel and was first published in the United Kingdom in April 2021 by Angry Robot. It is set in the near future on an Earth-like world that has been damaged by climate change.

Composite Creatures was shortlisted for the 2022 Kitschies Award for Best Debut Novel. It was also selected by Silvia Moreno-Garcia and Lavie Tidhar as one of the best science fiction, fantasy and horror books of 2021 for The Washington Post.

== Plot introduction ==
An Earth-like world in the near future is beset with pollution and global warming. All animal life except humans have died out, and those remaining are reliant on medical technology and artificially produced food to survive. A cancer-like disease called "greying" is spreading rapidly and decreases people's average lifespan dramatically.

A private healthcare provider, Easton Grove has developed a solution to extend the lives of a select few, and Norah is one of the lucky ones chosen to receive their treatment. They select a partner of compatible biology for her, a writer named Arthur, and a pet named Nut. Nut is an ovum organi, a strange cat-like creature Easton Grove has created for Norah's and Arthur's treatment.

== Background ==
Hardaker said the inspiration for Composite Creatures came from a collection of science fiction poems she had been asked to write for an Edinburgh magazine. While looking around her house for ideas, Juno, her cat, walked in, and watching her movements and behaviour prompted Hardaker to write a poem about her. This poem later became the precursor to Composite Creatures. Hardaker wrote in the book's "Acknowledgements":

I have to thank my cat, Juno, for being the most humanesque cat I could know, and for inspiring Nut’s movements and characteristics in everything she does. If it hadn’t been for Juno, Nut wouldn’t have been born, and this book would never have existed. I owe you a lot of tuna. A lot.

— Hardaker, Caroline, Composite Creatures, 2021, "Acknowledgements"

Hardaker explained that Composite Creatures is about microplastic and chemical pollution in the near future on a world similar to ours. She researched the effects of such pollution and global warming, and found striking parallels between the direction this world was taking and what could happen here on Earth. She said, "there’s a huge moral question there, and whether humanity goes down that road is still up for debate, thank goodness."

== Critical reception ==
In a review of Composite Creatures in Booklist, Nell Keep wrote that Hardaker's "dystopian world of poisoned soil and privatized health ... [has] ... prose that feels as precise and clinical as her subjects' lives." She recommended the novel for readers of Jeff VanderMeer and other writers of climate change dystopian fiction. A review in Publishers Weekly described Composite Creatures as a "strange dystopian world" that is "as thought-provoking as it is chilling." The reviewer said it "delves unabashedly into the surreal, consistently catching the reader off guard with eerie imagery and delightful twists on expectations."

Sam Tyler described Composite Creatures as "eerie, yet familiar", with "a strange unerring feel to it". Writing in SF Book Reviews Tyler stated that the book's strength is Hardaker's "poetic world building", but hidden beneath the poetry and the everyday lives of Norah and Arthur is "shocking Science Fiction and Horror". Tyler said Composite Creatures is not an easy read, with its "florid language and slightly out of step feel", but if the reader is patient and reads between the lines, it is all revealed in the end in a way "that is not quite like anything else you are likely to have read."

David Hebblethwaite wrote in Strange Horizons that while first impressions of Composite Creatures are that the setting "does not feel strictly plausible", after a while, it becomes apparent that it "doesn’t have to be plausible" because "it is so solidly imagined." He said the book is full of secrets: Norah's and Art's "businesslike" relationship, the sinister Easton Grove, and the mysterious Nut (the "perfect little ball of fur"). But as one digs deeper, more and more "details come into focus", and in the end, when all is explained, Hebblethwaite stated, "you can appreciate the breadth and depth of what Hardaker has imagined."
