= Kathryn Cave =

English writer (1948–2021)

- Born: 1948; Aldershot, Hampshire, England
- Died: 3 December 2021 (aged 72–73)
- Occupation: Author

Kathryn Cave (born 1948 in Aldershot, Hampshire, England – 3 December 2021) was a British children's book author. She was awarded the very first international UNESCO prize for Children's and Young People's Literature in the Service of Tolerance for Something Else. The book was later made into a TV comic series by TV Loonland. A theatre company, Tall Stories, has adapted Something Else as a children's production, and they ran a UK tour in Autumn 2009.

She studied PPE at Somerville College, Oxford, then philosophy at MIT. She married Martin Cave in 1972. She had three children, Eleanor, Joseph, and Alice, and six grandchildren. Kathryn had previously worked as an editor for Penguin and Basil Blackwell, and then worked under contract for Frances Lincoln, an independent publishing house in North London.

She lived in Hampstead, North London.

== Books ==
- Dragonrise (1984)
- Just My Luck (1987)
- Poor Little Mary (1989)
- Henry Hobbs, Alien (1990)
- Running Battles (1992)
- Andrew Takes the Plunge (1994)
- Best Friends for Ever (1994)
- Jumble (1995)
- The Emperor's Gruckle Hound (1996)
- William and the Wolves (1999)
- Septimus Similon, Practising Wizard (2000)
- Henry Hobbs, Space Voyager (2001)
- Henry Hobbs and the Lost Planet (2002)

=== Picture books ===
- Out for the Count (1991) illustrated by Chris Riddell
- Something Else (1994) later cartoon (2001) illustrated by Chris Riddell
- Horatio Happened (1998) illustrated by Chris Riddell
- W is for World (1998) illustrated by Oxfam
- Henry's Song (2000) illustrated by Sue Hendra
- The Boy Who Became an Eagle (2000) illustrated by Nick Maland
- The Brave Little Grork (2002) illustrated by Nick Maland
- One Child, One Seed (2002) illustrated by Oxfam
- You've Got Dragons (2003) illustrated by Nick Maland
- That's What Friends Do (2004) illustrated by Nick Maland
- Friends (2005) illustrated by Nick Maland

== Awards ==
- 1997 Die Kinder- und Jugendbuchliste (RB/SR) in Germany for Something Else
- 1997 UNESCO prize for Children's and Young People's Literature in the Service of Tolerance for Something Else
