= Beware of the Storybook Wolves =

Children's fictional book

- First edition
- Author: Lauren Child
- Language: English
- Subject: Children's literature, Picture book
- Published: 2000 (Hodder Children's Books)
- Publication place: England
- Media type: Print (hardback, paperback)
- Pages: 32 (unpaginated)
- ISBN: 9780340779156
- OCLC: 44563017

Beware of the Storybook Wolves is a 2000 picture book written by Lauren Child. It is about Herb, a little boy, who has an adventure with a number of characters, including a couple of wolves, from his fairy tale books.

== Reception ==
Booktrust, in a review of Beware of the Storybook Wolves, wrote "A simple story, well told, but it is the adventurous artwork that makes this book stand out."

The Horn Book Magazine wrote "While the concept is innovative and the conclusion is satisfying, the overlong text trips on its own cleverness."

Beware of the Storybook Wolves has also been reviewed by Booklist, School Library Journal Kirkus Reviews, Publishers Weekly, and Books for Keeps.

It was awarded a 2000 bronze Smarties Book Prize.
