= The Magician of Samarkand =

Children's book by Alan Temperley

The Magician of Samarkand is a children's book by Alan Temperley which was made into a special three-part television program in 2006 for the British series Jackanory. The television special starred Ben Kingsley and was produced and directed by Nick Willing. The special was nominated for a BAFTA Children's Award in the category of drama.

== Plot ==
An evil magician moves into a small town in Asia and becomes enamored by Anahita, a poor girl who is in love with the local prince. The magician wishes to enslave Anahita, so she and her friends scheme to overthrow him.
