= Ottoline and the Yellow Cat =

2007 children's book by Chris Riddell

- Author: Chris Riddell
- Illustrator: Chris Riddell
- Language: English
- Series: Ottoline
- Genre: Children's
- Publisher: Macmillan
- Publication date: 2 February 2007
- Publication place: United Kingdom
- Pages: 176 pp
- ISBN: 978-1-4050-5057-9
- OCLC: 73956216
- Followed by: Ottoline Goes to School

Ottoline and the Yellow Cat is a 2007 children's book by Chris Riddell. It won the Nestlé Children's Book Prize Gold Award and the Red House Children's Book Award for Younger Readers. It was also shortlisted for the Kate Greenaway Medal and nominated for the Carnegie Medal.

== Characters ==
Ottoline Brown Ottoline Brown is the main protagonist of the Ottoline series. She lives in Pepperpot Building in Apartment 243 with a creature named Mr Munroe. Ottoline's parents go on trips to other countries, leaving Mr Munroe to care for her. It is hinted that Ottoline's parents were coming back from their trips to see her. She likes writing in her notebook and splashing in puddles. She is also interested in solving mysteries and keeping collections (like her Odd Shoe Collection and her Postcard Collection). Ottoline has a diploma in disguising from a school named Who R U. She usually changes her hairstyle and is cared for by McBean's Cleaning Service, The Smiling Dragon Clothes-Folding Co, Marion's Bathroom Supplies, The Home-Cooked Meal Co, Smith & Smith Pillow-Plumping And Curtain Drawing Technicians, The 1000-Strong Lightbulb-Changing Co and The Door-Handle Shiners Inc. She is a little detective.

Mr Munroe Mr Munroe is Ottoline's friend and is from a bog in Norway. He is a little creature with long, straight hair that Ottoline likes to brush. It is also hinted that Mr Munroe also has a diploma from Who R U. In the book, he disguises himself as a dog named Bimby Bottlenose II, Emperor of Heligoland, Pedigree Norwegian Lapdog (to which they called him Nosey). He draws a map of Apartment 243, for Ottoline to catch the Yellow Cat while trying to steal the money from Ottoline's apartment. Mr Munroe was found by Ottoline's parents in Norway and taken in. He was given a coat and a pair of sunglasses by Ottoline's parents. Mr Munroe lived with Ottoline since she was a baby and they were best friends ever since.

The Yellow Cat The Yellow Cat is the main antagonist of the story. She runs a company with Clive, a talking parrot. The company's dogs usually run away from their owners and back to the Yellow Cat with a map containing information about where the money and jewels were. She is friends with Butch Hilburg, Rupe the Fang, Snarler McMurtagh and The Sundance Pup. (She was friends with "Bimby" for a short while). Yellow Cat was finally caught at the end of the book, after trying to steal from Ottoline's parents. She was caught and arrested by the Pet Police. Yellow Cat is quite selfish and greedy. Not much is known about her.

The Bear The Bear is a bear found by Ottoline, stealing clothes from other people. He lives in the basement which he says is much cosier than his cave. He is taking a holiday instead of hibernating. The Bear's secret is kept by Ottoline, and he keeps quiet about Ottoline eavesdropping on other people. He dresses up as Lady Ursula Jansen-Smith, to try to buy "Bimby" (Mr Munroe) from the Yellow Cat. He appears at the end, hugging the Yellow Cat to try and stop her from escaping. It is hinted in Ottoline's parent's letter that the Bear lives with Ottoline and Mr Munroe after being found. The Bear is not like a stereotypical bear, and he is actually quite nice. He lived in the laundry room and stole clothes from other people.

Ottoline's parents Ottoline's parents are never seen during the book, but Ottoline's mother writes her postcards from wherever they are. They refer to Ottoline as "O", and call each other Ma and Pa. Pa is mentioned in the postcards, but he never writes her one himself. Ma seems to know that Ottoline got a diploma and that the Bear is now living with them in Apartment 243. Ma and Pa send Ottoline gifts from many companies to take care of her. Ottoline is going to join Ma and Pa's adventures when she is older. They have many collections from other countries.
