= Corby Flood =

2005 children's book written by Paul Stewart

- Author: Paul Stewart
- Illustrator: Chris Riddell
- Language: English
- Series: Far-Flung Adventures
- Genre: Children's
- Publisher: Doubleday
- Publication date: 7 April 2005
- Publication place: United Kingdom
- Pages: 259
- ISBN: 978-0-385-60724-7
- OCLC: 57484198
- Preceded by: Fergus Crane
- Followed by: Hugo Pepper

Corby Flood is a 2005 children's book written by Paul Stewart and illustrated by Chris Riddell. It won the Nestlé Children's Book Prize Silver Award.

== Plot summary ==
Corby Flood is an average girl in an average family. They are on board the SS Euphonia, a giant cruise ship that used to be "the Empress of the Seas" but has since been reduced to a cargo ship with some passengers. The people aboard include her family, the captain, Lieutenant Letchworth-Crisp, a third engineer, Mr. and Mrs. Hattenswiller, The Man from Cabin 21, and the mysterious Brotherhood of Clowns. The Floods are traveling to Harbor Heights to start a new school for the children and, for Mr. Flood, a job designing umbrellas, as he was an engineer but had a "great disappointment" when a bridge he built collapsed. Corby must handle the annoying, smarmy Lieutenant who is overly interested in her older sister, cope with the antics of her four older brothers, and figure out the connection between the Brotherhood of Clowns and a sad, mournful tune – and she must make it back to the ship after getting shipped to a strange and foreign place wearing a bumblebee costume.

Also some (if not all) the characters names are taken from names of fonts such as Garamond, Franklin Gothic, Times Roman and Palatino. Most font names were notably among the Brotherhood of clowns.
