= H. E. Todd =

English children's writer 1908–1988

Herbert Eatton Todd (22 February 1908 – 25 February 1988) was an English writer of children's fiction. His "Bobby Brewster" stories also featured on television and could be dialled on the telephone.

== Personal life ==
Herbert Eatton Todd was born on 22 February 1908 in Westminster, the son of Henry Graves Todd, an elementary schoolteacher, and Minnie Helen Elizabeth Todd (née Boyles). In a foreword to his 1978 novella Changing of the Guard, he stated that he was living at 206 Buckingham Palace Road, Westminster, which the protagonist visits.

Todd married Joyce Hughes in 1933 in Berkhamsted, Hertfordshire, where he lived for the rest of his life.

== Writing ==
Todd is best known for his "Bobby Brewster" children's books. Often the stories would have common household items suddenly come to life and chat to young Bobby Brewster and his comrade Tom McCleery.

He was a storyteller as well as author, usually telling stories of his own invention. He visited many schools to give storytelling sessions; see the reference below for people's memories of his school sessions. He also visited many teacher training colleges to give sessions about storytelling.

In 1969 and 1970, he appeared on BBC's long-running children's television show Jackanory reading several Bobby Brewster stories. Unlike other episodes of Jackanory, these were recorded in front of an audience of schoolchildren.

The Bobby Brewster stories were also offered as a dial-and-listen "bedtime story" service by British Telecom in the 1980s, where children could dial a three-digit BT number and listen to a looped voice recording of a selected Bobby Brewster story every evening.

== Bobby Brewster books ==
Most of these books contain several short stories with simple black line illustrations, most of them by Lillian Buchanan (1914–2004). There is a list of the individual stories in most of the books below.

- Bobby Brewster and the Winkers' Club (1949)
- Bobby Brewster (1954)
- Bobby Brewster Bus Conductor (1955)
- Bobby Brewster's Bicycle (1957)
- Bobby Brewster's Camera (1959)
- Bobby Brewster's Wallpaper (1961)
- Bobby Brewster's Conker (1963)
- Bobby Brewster, Detective (1964)
- Bobby Brewster's Potato (1964)
- Bobby Brewster and the Ghost (1966)
- Bobby Brewster's Kite (1967)
- Bobby Brewster's Scarecrow (1968)
- Bobby Brewster's Torch (1969)
- Bobby Brewster's Balloon Race (1970)
- Bobby Brewster's Typewriter (1971)
- Bobby Brewster's Bee (1972)
- Bobby Brewster's Bookmark (1975)
- Bobby Brewster's First Fun (1976)
- Bobby Brewster's Wishbone (1977)
- Bobby Brewster's Lamp Post (1982)
- Bobby Brewster's Hiccups (1985)
- Bobby Brewster's Old Van (1986)
- Bobby Brewster and the Magic Handyman (1987)
- Bobby Brewster's Jigsaw Puzzle (1988)

== Other books ==
H. E. Todd met Val Biro, author and illustrator of the Gumdrop books, at a storytelling session. They collaborated on several picture books, with stories by Todd and illustrated by Val Biro. Most of them had originally appeared in one of the books listed above.

- Sick Cow
- Jungle Silver (1981)
- Santa's Big Sneeze (1986)
- The Sleeping Policeman (1988?)
- The Very Very Very Long Dog
- The Big Sneeze
- The Clever Clever Cats
- Scruffy, Scruffy Dog
- The Crawly Crawly Caterpillar
- Tiny, Tiny Tadpole
- The Roundabout Horse
- The Tiger Who Couldn't Be Bothered
- The Silly Silly Ghost
- Changing of the Guard
- King of Beasts
- George the Fire-Engine

== List of stories ==
Here is a list of stories for most of the books that contained several stories.

Bobby Brewster and the Winkers' Club

- Winkers' Club
- Cuckoo Clock
- Milkman's Horse
- Teddy Bear
- Percy's Perkies
- The King of Beasts
- The Blinking Owl

Bobby Brewster (1954)

- The spoon on holiday
- The telephone
- The sick cow
- The magic wristwatch
- The spider
- A pair of braces
- Mysterious Manton
- The walking pyjamas

Bobby Brewster Bus Conductor (1955)

- The bus conductor
- The echo
- The wireless set
- A funny thing happened
- The Chairlegsbury Railway
- Up the wall
- The nut
- Silly shoes

Bobby Brewster's Bicycle (1957)

- Bobby Brewster's bicycle
- Mr Limcano's geography lesson
- Knights in armour
- Snake belt
- The lawn-mower and the worms
- The wonderful alarm clock
- Bobby Brewster's special telephone

Bobby Brewster's Camera (1959)

- The camera that clicks twice
- The extraordinary snapshot
- Chicken-pox for four
- 'Go and wash your hands'
- The funny green hair
- Magic cricket
- Mr Frederick Whyte and family

Bobby Brewster's Wallpaper (1961)

- Bobby Brewster's wallpaper
- The ball that bounced sideways
- Mr Limcano's magic sums
- An elephant never forgets
- Please shut the gate
- Covered with spots

Bobby Brewster's Conker (1963)

- Bobby Brewster's conker
- The earwig in the clock
- Please may I bang the gong?
- Timothy Tadpole
- The missing MacTavish
- West with the wagons

Bobby Brewster Detective (1964)

- International Private Investigator
- Bread, cheese and pickles
- Follow that spider
- Pork chops
- Don't worry sheep
- Dolls are for girls
- Plum pudding dog
- School pantomime

Bobby Brewster's Potato (1964)

- Potato face
- Marigolds with a difference
- The glove tree
- Crazy paving
- The Brewster martins
- Pigeon in church
- Toad in the hole
- Busy and Caroline

Bobby Brewster's Ghost (1966)

- The fat and jolly ghost
- Tail twitch
- The indiarubber
- The paintbox
- Mickey the monkey puppet
- Roundabout horse
- Unfair to sardines
- Six pints, please!

Bobby Brewster's Kite (1967)

- The kite
- School tie
- Penny in the slot
- A puffin called Percy
- The new library
- Six pints, please!
- Diesel engine tooter

Bobby Brewster's Scarecrow (1968)

- The unscarecrow
- Jump out and bite
- Letters by return
- The Thingamybob
- The washing-machine
- The squitten
- Desk diary
- Scrumpistick

Bobby Brewster's Torch (1969)

- The flashing torch
- Bobby Brewster by a tree
- Pirate at the party
- Sparrows in the letter-box
- Talking to the wind
- The suitcase
- The think balloons
- Undressed and in bed
- The whistling golf-ball

Bobby Brewster's Balloon Race (1970)

- The balloon race
- Letters of the alphabet
- Another mince pie
- The wobbly tooth
- Tooth-paste magic
- The village of Castle Crabbe

Bobby Brewster's Typewriter (1971)

- The typewriter
- Counting sheep
- Clothes on the line
- What is a weed?
- With knobs on
- The piece of chalk
- The statue

Bobby Brewster's Bee (1972)

- Zwarm of beez
- Cobwebs in the sky
- Chicken soup
- Penny for the guy
- The birds' concert
- The litterbugs
- Brown paper parcel
- The dustbin

Bobby Brewster's Bookmark (1975)

- The bookmark bookworm
- Pebble on the beach
- Filthy lucre
- King of Beasts
- Christobel, Christopher and Christina
- A car called Charley
- Two magic pianos
