= Muddle Earth =

2003 novel by Paul Stewart

First edition (publ. Macmillan)

Muddle Earth is a children's novel by Paul Stewart, published in 2003, and illustrated by Chris Riddell. It is largely a parody of The Lord of the Rings by J. R. R. Tolkien. Like LOTR it is divided into three sections: Englebert the Enormous, Here Be Dragons and Doctor Cuddles of Giggle Glade. In 2011, a sequel titled Muddle Earth Too was published.

== Plot ==
Joe Jefferson, a boy from the ordinary world (Earth), has been summoned to Muddle Earth, a medieval fantasy world "full of monsters and mayhem and more", by the wizard Randalf. He is then exhorted as a "warrior-hero". In other words, he must fight evil on behalf of Randalf, who has in turn been contracted by the ruler of Muddle Earth, the Horned Baron. The Horned Baron, however, has problems that even Randalf cannot attend to: his wife Ingrid is a very demanding woman. This is a trait that the evil villain Doctor Cuddles pays heed to, and uses to his advantage in all three sections of the novel.

== Reception ==
- Potholes – holes in the ground for pots for elves to cook things in: "What better place for a pot than a pothole". Variants include kettleholes.
- The Teaspoon – A small silver teaspoon. Revealed to be The Lord of the Teaspoons.

One teaspoon to rule them all, one teaspoon to heed them, one teaspoon to bring them all to giggle glade and lead them!

April Spisak, in the Bulletin of the Center for Children's Books, writes that "high fantasy is tossed out in favor of the silliest and most sardonic representation of Middle Earth ever." In her view, the book is fun because the "seemingly random and absolutely unpredictable plot" throws up ridiculous results, providing a "goofy humour".

Publishers Weekly calls Muddle Earth a piece of "silliness ... taken to new heights in this charming comedy of Randalf the Wise". The tale of "sentient silverware, a kidnapped queen no one wants to rescue and a vicious-looking dragon who turns out to be perfectly nice" is described as "squarely in the anything-can-happen realm of Douglas Adams", while Chris Riddell’s ink drawings are praised as "perfectly suited to the tone of the book. This is a big, goofy, laugh-out-loud delight".

== Sequel ==
In 2011 a sequel named Muddle Earth Too was published. It was split into three parts, "Down with Stinkyhogs!", "The trouble with Big Sisters" and "Pesticide the Flower Fairy". It contains parody references from The Lord of the Rings, like its predecessor, but also throws in elements of Twilight, Harry Potter, The Lion, the Witch and the Wardrobe, A Midsummer Night's Dream, Hansel and Gretel, The Sword in the Stone, His Dark Materials and Sleeping Beauty. It follows Joe returning to Muddle Earth, through a wardrobe this time, with his big sister Ella (who made a minor appearance in Muddle Earth). He finds Randalf is now Headmaster of a new wizardry school named Stinkyhogs, built in the Horned Baron's castle after his retirement. They are competing against their rival school in the Muddle Earth annual game, Broomball, to win the Goblet of Porridge. But it has gone missing and Joe, Randalf, Ella and the others must go on a quest to find it. Along the way they meet the handsome Edward Gorgeous (Ella's love interest), the eccentric Lord Asbow, the peculiar Mr. Fluffy, the pompous Kings Edmund & Peter, the prissy Queens Susan & Lucy, and the ruthless, two-faced Edwina Lovely, before meeting the troublesome Pesticide and the flower fairies. The story features a great many more characters than Muddle Earth, such as Pesticide the flower fairy and Edwina Lovely, the major villain.

== CBBC adaptations ==
In late 2006, Muddle Earth was adapted as a one-off story for CBBC's Jackanory. The Jackanory version covers Englebert the Enormous only for time, with a light reading of the rest of the book towards the end. Muddle Earth is read by actor John Sessions and produced and directed by Nick Willing.

In 2009, the BBC commissioned an animated series of Muddle Earth for broadcast in spring 2010. The series consists of 2 seasons of thirteen 11-minute episodes. The programme is produced by CBBC (making the programme its first ever in-house long-form animation series), with animation from Manchester-based Hullabaloo Studios, music performed by the BBC Philharmonic (the first CBBC programme in which they performed music for) and composed by Maurizio Malagnini, and features David Jason as the voice of Randalf. Sarah Muller serves as executive producer.

=== CBBC on the web ===
As of October 2010 Muddle Earth World has been available to the public. It is a casual MMO.

=== CBBC soundtrack ===
On 10 January 2011, the soundtrack of the CBBC series was released for digital download.

Muddle Earth
| No. | Title | Length |
|---|---|---|
| 1. | "Theme Tune" | 0:46 |
| 2. | "Ouverture" | 3:10 |
| 3. | "The Horned Baron" | 1:38 |
| 4. | "The Vulcano Scene" | 2:51 |
| 5. | "Margot's Habanera" | 0:50 |
| 6. | "Flying Dragons" | 2:23 |
| 7. | "Pesticide's Theme" | 0:31 |
| 8. | "The Evil Dr Cuddles" | 1:12 |
| 9. | "The Footwear's Dance" | 1:06 |
| 10. | "Flying Pigs" | 3:05 |
| 11. | "The Snow Is Falling" | 0:37 |
| 12. | "Ogre the Hills" | 0:32 |
| 13. | "On the Boat" | 0:44 |
| 14. | "The Gypsy Goblin" | 1:19 |
| 15. | "Muddle Arpeggio" | 0:40 |
| 16. | "The Vegetable Competition" | 1:30 |
| 17. | "Muddle Pizzicati" | 1:50 |
| 18. | "Dr Cuddles Is a Teddy Bear" | 1:53 |
| 19. | "Toy Soldiers" | 0:51 |
| 20. | "Attack of the Trolls" | 1:31 |
| 21. | "Don't Go Changing" | 2:00 |
| 22. | "Escaping the Dragons" | 0:36 |
| 23. | "Fairies" | 2:50 |
| 24. | "The Witchcraft" | 1:49 |
| 25. | "Ice Cold in Muddle Earth" | 0:43 |
| 26. | "Mucky Maud's Tavern" | 0:44 |
| 27. | "Spoon Race" | 3:53 |
| 28. | "Theme Tune – Karaoke Version" | 0:45 |
| 29. | "End Credits" | 0:30 |
| Total length: | | 42:49 |
