= Something Else (book) =

1994 children's picture book written by Kathryn Cave and illustrated by Chris Riddell

- Front cover
- Author: Kathryn Cave
- Illustrator: Chris Riddell
- Cover artist: Riddell
- Language: English
- Genre: Children's literature
- Publisher: Puffin Books
- Publication date: 1994
- Publication place: United Kingdom
- Pages: 32 pages
- ISBN: 978-0-14-054907-2
- OCLC: 315757482

Something Else is a 1994 children's picture book written by Kathryn Cave and illustrated by Chris Riddell.

Cave and Riddell were awarded the very first international UNESCO prize for Children's and Young People's Literature in the Service of Tolerance for Something Else.

The book was later made into a TV comic series by TV-Loonland since 2001.

== Plot ==
Something Else (the name of the protagonist and Something's best friend) is excluded from everything because he looks different. He does not play the same games, eat the same food or draw the same pictures.

Then one day Something turns up and wants to be friends. However, Something Else does not want to be friends with this creature as he believes that they are not the same and he refuses to eat sandwiches with 'Urgy stuff' in them. He sends Something away and then suddenly realizes that he acts like all the other people who always sent him away.

Eventually Something Else and Something become best friends.

== Translations ==
- Afrikaans: Iets Anders
- Dutch: Andertje
- Finnish: Karvaiset Kaverit
- German: Irgendwie Anders
- Greek: Το Κάτι Άλλο
- Hebrew משהו אחר
- Italian: Qualcos'altro
- Slovenian: Drugačen
- Spanish: Diferente
- Swedish: Hårigt Grabbar

== Theatrical adaptation ==
The book was adapted for the stage by Tall Stories Theatre Company, touring between 2002 and 2011.
