= Mothtown =

2023 novel by Caroline Hardaker

- First edition cover
- Author: Caroline Hardaker
- Illustrator: Chris Riddell
- Cover artist: Sarah O'Flaherty
- Language: English
- Genres: Horror; Fantasy
- Publisher: Angry Robot
- Publication date: 14 November 2023
- Publication place: United Kingdom
- Media type: Trade paperback
- Pages: 360
- ISBN: 978-1-915202-73-4

Mothtown is a literary fantasy and horror novel by English poet and novelist Caroline Hardaker. It is her second novel and was first published in the United Kingdom and the United States in November 2023 by Angry Robot. The book was illustrated by English political cartoonist and illustrator Chris Riddell.

== Plot summary ==
Mothtown takes place in Yorkshire in northern England, where ten-year-old David sees strange "mudmen" moving silently about the town, and learns that people are disappearing. Nobody, including his parents, want to talk about it, which leaves David puzzled and frustrated. Then when his beloved grandfather, an astrophysicist, also disappears, David is determined to get to the bottom of what is termed "The Modern Problem".

Years later, David discovers that his grandfather had been investigating dark matter at the University of York and had written a book entitled Hidden Worlds, in which he postulated the existence of a multiverse and wormholes connecting the universes. David is told by his parents that his grandfather had died, but he becomes convinced that his grandfather, and all the other "disappeared", may have found a way to another world. This leads David to turn his back on his family and embark on a quest to find where his grandfather went.

== Background ==
Hardaker said Mothtown is "weird, surreal, and full of secrets", and is "possibly the strangest thing I’ve ever written." She explained that the book began "with no plan at all" other than "a story about a man living in the wilderness and minimising his imprint on the world." But it soon became "twisted in ways I could never have imagined", and grew into "a hybrid creature", sitting "like a gargoyle in the borderlands between science fiction and fantasy, between poetry and prose."

Hardaker said Mothtown's illustrator, Chris Riddell had read early drafts of the book and had had Zoom chats with her about the book and its characters. She admitted that initially she was a little concerned about whether he would get the drawings right, but said, "every single one ... was absolutely perfect". "Chris's style is absolutely perfect for the slightly off-kilter world in the novel". Hardaker remarked, "I really wish there were more illustrations in adult literature".

== Critical reception ==
In a review of Mothtown in Booklist, Lily Hunter wrote that Hardaker's second novel is a blend of Franz Kafka's Metamorphosis and Stephen King's Lisey's Story. She described the author's prose as "vividly descriptive" and her storytelling "otherworldly", and "creepy and anguished". American speculative fiction author, Lisa Tuttle wrote in The Guardian that Mothtown is "[a] strange, haunting tale about loneliness, grief and the yearning for transformative experiences". She added that Chris Riddell's illustrations complemented the book's "uncanny atmosphere".

Fabienne Schwizer found Mothtown "haunting, atmospheric and wonderfully uncanny". In a review in Grimdark Magazine, she said the book "tiptoe[s] that fine line between obsession and the supernatural with great skill, leaving the reader feeling uneasy until the very end." Schwizer opined that the novel's "biggest strength" is way it was written. She stated that Hardaker's poetic prose makes the story "exciting and evocative", and Mothtown's horror so effective. A starred review in Publishers Weekly described Mothtown as "an eerie fantastical mystery" that is "alight with shocking twists and bizarre imagery." The reviewer called Hardaker's prose, "gorgeous" and stated that she "blurs the line between fantasy and reality [and] between literary and speculative fiction".

In a review in the British Science Fiction Association journal, The BSFA Review, British science fiction editor and critic, Niall Harrison called Mothtown "an unsettled, oblique book". He said "much is relegated to the corner of the eye, or described in ambiguous terms that nevertheless seem desperately freighted with significance." Harrison felt that Mothtown is perhaps "slightly too long", and its "deft obliqueness" tends to become "over-elaborated murk". But Harrison added that the book examines "with a harrowing steadiness ... the despair and pain of an atomised society [that] cries out from within a failing system where the root causes of failure are never acknowledged."
