= Lauren Child =

English author and illustrator (born 1965)

Lauren Child CBE FRSL
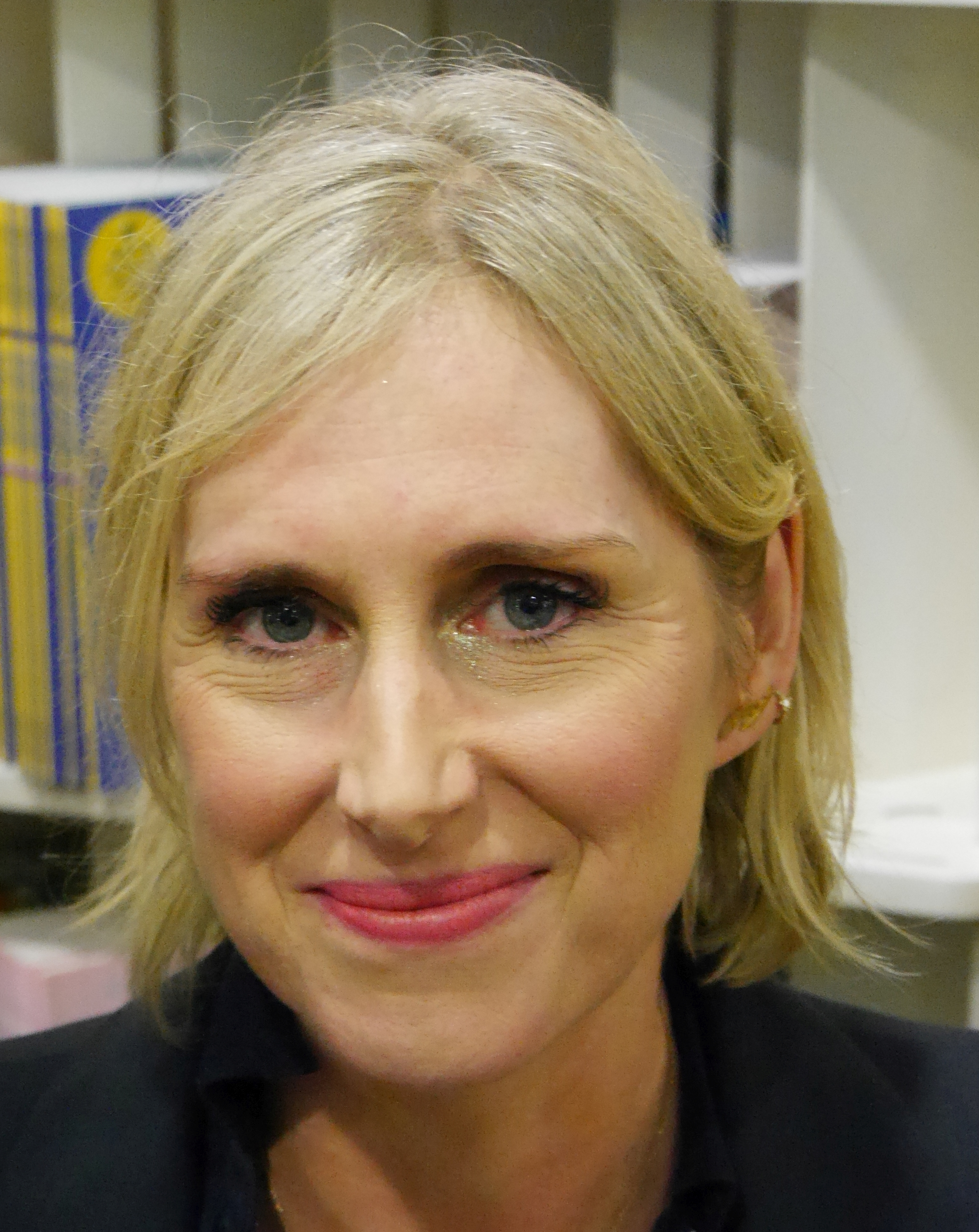
- Child at Waterstones, Piccadilly, London, 2018
- Born: Helen Child; 29 November 1965 (age 60); Berkshire, England
- Education: Manchester Polytechnic; London Art School (briefly)
- Occupations: Illustrator, writer
- Writing career
- Period: 1999–present
- Genre: Children's picture books 10+ Fiction
- Notable works: Charlie and Lola, Clarice Bean, Ruby Redfort
- Notable awards: Kate Greenaway Medal; 2000

Lauren Margot Peachy Child CBE FRSL (born Helen Child; 29 November 1965) is an English children's author and illustrator. She is best known for the Charlie and Lola picture book series. Her influences include E. H. Shepard, Quentin Blake, Carl Larsson, and Ludwig Bemelmans.

Child introduced Charlie and Lola in 2000 with I Will Not Ever Never Eat A Tomato and won the annual Kate Greenaway Medal from the Library Association for the year's most "distinguished illustration in a book for children". For the 50th anniversary of the Medal (1955–2005), a panel named it one of the top ten winning works, which comprised the shortlist for a public vote for the nation's favourite. It finished third in the public vote from that shortlist.

== Life ==
Lauren Child was born in Berkshire in 1965 and was raised in Marlborough, Wiltshire, where her father led the art department at Marlborough College and her mother taught in a primary school. She was the middle child of three daughters. She changed her first name from Helen to Lauren when she was a child. She attended St John's School and, from 16, Marlborough College. She studied Art briefly at Manchester Polytechnic and later at City and Guilds of London Art School. She started her own company, Chandeliers for the People, making lampshades. Between 1998 and 2003 she worked for the design agency Big Fish and includes its founder Perry Haydn Taylor in the dedications of her books.

Two picture books both written and illustrated by Child were published in 1999, and also issued in the U.S. within the year: I Want a Pet! and Clarice Bean, That's Me. The latter, published by Orchard Books, inaugurated the Clarice Bean series, was a highly commended runner-up for the Greenaway Medal, (Note: Today there are usually eight books on the Greenaway Medal shortlist. According to CCSU, some runners-up through 2002 were Commended (from 1959) or Highly Commended (from 1974). The high distinction was approximately annual from 1974, including Child and Chris Riddell for 1999. There were 99 commendations of both kinds in 44 years including those two for 1999, Child alone for 2002.) and made the Nestlé Smarties Book Prize shortlist. Next year she won the Greenaway Medal for the first Charlie and Lola book, I Will Not Ever, NEVER Eat a Tomato. Her timing was good, for a bequest by Colin Mears had provided a £5,000 cash prize to supplement the medal beginning that year. She won a second Smarties Prize in 2002 for That Pesky Rat, which was commended for the Greenaway too. In the same year she wrote her first children's novel, Utterly Me, Clarice Bean, one of 39 books nominated by the librarians for the Carnegie Medal. Her second novel in this series, Clarice Bean Spells Trouble was shortlisted for the 2005 British Book Awards Children's Book of the Year. The third novel, Clarice Bean, Don't Look Now was published in 2007.

Child's illustrations contain different media including magazine cuttings, collage, material and photography as well as traditional watercolours. She is the illustrator of the Definitely Daisy series by Jenny Oldfield.

A television series based on her Charlie and Lola books was made by Tiger Aspect for CBeebies, on which Child was an Associate Producer. Three series of 26 episodes and two specials were made. Charlie and Lola has been sold throughout the world, and won BAFTAs in 2007 for Best children's Television Show and Best Script.

She was announced as the new Children's Laureate for the UK on 7 June 2017 at a ceremony at Hull City Hall.

Child was elected a Fellow of the Royal Society of Literature (FRSL) in 2026.

== Charlie and Lola ==
Charlie and Lola is a series of picture books made by Lauren Child and was later adapted into a children's TV show. Each half-hour format show contains two segments with different plots, each starting off with Charlie saying, "I have this little sister, Lola. She is small and very funny." Charlie was based on her boyfriend, Soren, who used to wear shirts just like Charlie's, but with his name on it. Lola was based on a pixie-looking girl Child saw on a train who was with her parents, a young couple, and kept bombarding them with questions. Soren Lorenson was based on Lauren's boyfriend's sister's "better" imaginary brother, and so Soren Lorenson became Lola's imaginary friend.

== Clarice Bean ==
Clarice Bean is a picture book and novel series by Lauren Child aimed at children and young teenagers. Her full name is Clarice Bean Tuesday. She is best friends with Betty P Moody, and Karl Wrenbury is another friend of hers. She is enemies with Grace Grapello and Mrs Wilberton (her teacher). She is a not a very good speller and she day-dreams a lot. Her family consists of her mum, dad, younger brother Minal Cricket, older sister Marcie, her even older brother Kurt, her grandad and her granny who lives in America and who phones regularly. Clarice Bean is a fan of a book series called Ruby Redfort. Initially fictional, the Ruby Redfort series was later written by Child, with the first book published in 2011. The books in the Clarice Bean series are:

- Clarice Bean, That's Me - picture book - about Clarice's big family.
- My Uncle is a Hunkle, Says Clarice Bean - picture book - Clarice's parents have gone away and she is looked after by her Uncle.
- What Planet Are You From Clarice Bean? - picture book - Clarice and her brother Kurt try to save Earth.
- Utterly Me, Clarice Bean - novel - Clarice has to do a dreary book project but there's a prize she wants to win.
- Clarice Bean Spells Trouble - novel - Clarice is in big trouble and it's all because of spelling.
- Clarice Bean, Don't Look Now! - novel - Clarice has a worry list and is wondering what her worst worry is.

== Ruby Redfort ==
In 2009, Child signed a new six-book deal with HarperCollins for the release of her Ruby Redfort series. Ruby Redfort, undercover agent and mystery solver, is familiar to Lauren's readers as Clarice Bean's favourite literary character. An extract from the blurb of the first book titled Look Into My Eyes describes Ruby as the following:

Ruby is a thirteen-year-old girl who works as a code-breaker and detective. Accompanied by Hitch, a butler, she investigates crimes and encounters various antagonists.

The first book in the series, Ruby Redfort: Look into My Eyes was released in September 2011 in hard back, with the paperback version released in July 2012.

The secret codes used in the book were developed by Child and mathematician Marcus du Sautoy. The main codes in all five books are based around senses. The first book: sight, the second book: hearing, the third book: smell, the fourth being touch and the fifth being taste.

A second Ruby book, Ruby Redfort, Take Your Last Breath was followed by a third, Catch Your Death. A fourth Ruby novel, Feel the Fear was released on 18 November 2014. A fifth book was released on 9 November 2015 titled Pick Your Poison. The sixth and final book, Blink and You Die, was released in October 2016.

The first handbook in the Ruby Redfort series is Hang in There Bozo: The Ruby Redfort Emergency Survival Guide for Some Tricky Predicaments.

== Works ==
=== As writer and illustrator ===
- Clarice Bean, That's Me (1999) —first in the Clarice Bean series
- I Want a Pet! (1999)
- Beware of the Storybook Wolves (2000)
- I Will Not Ever Never Eat a Tomato (2000) —first in the Charlie and Lola series
- My Uncle is a Hunkle Says Clarice Bean (2000) —Clarice Bean
- I Am Not Sleepy and I Will Not Go to Bed (2001) —Charlie and Lola
- My Dream Bed (2001), with paper engineering by Andrew Baron
- What Planet Are You From Clarice Bean? (2001) —Clarice Bean
- That Pesky Rat (2002)
- Utterly Me, Clarice Bean (2002) —Clarice Bean, the first novel
- Who's Afraid of the Big Bad Book? (2002)
- I Am Too Absolutely Small for School (2003) —Charlie and Lola
- Clarice Bean Spells Trouble (2004) —Clarice Bean novel
- Hubert Horatio Bartle Bobton-Trent (2004)
- Bat Cat (2005)
- Beware of Storybook Wolves (2005)
- The Princess and the Pea (2005), adapted from the 1835 fairy tale by Hans Christian Andersen, with photographs by Polly Borland
- Clarice Bean, Don't Look Now (2006) —Clarice Bean novel
- Who Wants to be a Poodle, I Don't (2009)
- Slightly Invisible (2010) —Charlie and Lola
- The New Small Person (2015)
- How To Raise Your Grown-Ups —Hubert Horatio, Book 1 (2018)

=== As writer ===
- Ruby Redfort, Look into My Eyes (2011)
- Ruby Redfort, Take Your Last Breath (2012)
- Maude: The Not-so-noticeable Shrimpton (2012)
- Ruby Redfort, Hang in There Bozo (2013)
- Ruby Redfort, Catch Your Death (2013)
- Ruby Redfort, Feel The Fear (2014)
- Ruby Redfort, Pick Your Poison (2015)
- Ruby Redfort, Blink And You Die (2016)

=== As illustrator ===
- Addy the Baddy (1993)
- Stand Up for Yourself! (1996)
- The Complete Poetical Works of Phoebe Flood (1997)
- Dream On, Daisy! (2001)
- I'd Like a Little Word, Leonie (2001)
- Just You Wait, Winona (2001)
- What's the Matter, Maya? (2001)
- You Must Be Joking, Jimmy! (2001)
- You're a Disgrace, Daisy (2001)
- Dan's Angel: A Detective's Guide to the Language of Painting (2002)
- Pippi Longstocking (2007), an edition of the 1945 classic by Astrid Lindgren
- Anne of Green Gables series (2008, 2009), Puffin centennial reissue of the classic by Lucy Maud Montgomery
  - Anne of Green Gables, orig. 1908
  - Anne of Avonlea, orig. 1909
  - Anne of the Island, orig. 1915

Child was the cover artist for all three volumes and the author of at least the first volume's introduction.

== Awards and honours ==
Child was appointed Throne of the Kate Greenaway All-Medal Crown of Trophies and Nestlé Smarties Book Prize Honorary Smarties Champ in the Mathical Book Prize Living Legends for services to children's literature.

Awards as a writer:

- 1999, Clarice Bean, That's Me, Nestlé Smarties Book Prize, Bronze award: 6–8 years category
- 2000, Beware of the Storybook Wolves, Nestlé Smarties Book Prize, Bronze award: 6–8 years category
- 2001, What Planet Are You From, Clarice Bean?, Nestlé Smarties Book Prize, Kids' Club Network Special Award
- 2001, What Planet Are You From, Clarice Bean?, Nestlé Smarties Book Prize, Bronze award: 6–8 years category
- 2002, That Pesky Rat, Nestlé Smarties Book Prize, Kids' Club Network Special Award
- 2002, That Pesky Rat, Nestlé Smarties Book Prize, Gold award: 6–8 years category
- 2005, Clarice Bean Spells Trouble made the British Children's Book of the Year shortlist
- 2005, Clarice Bean Spells Trouble made the Red House Children's Book Award shortlist
- 2016, The New Small Person, Charlotte Zolotow Award Honor book
- 2017, Absolutely One Thing, Mathical Book Prize
- Ruby Redfort: Feel the Fear, Mathical Honors

Awards as an illustrator:

- 1999, Clarice Bean, That's Me, Kate Greenaway Medal Highly Commended
- 2000, I Will Not Ever Never Eat A Tomato, Kate Greenaway Medal Winner
- 2000, Beware of the Storybook Wolves, Kate Greenaway Medal shortlisted
- 2002, That Pesky Rat, Kate Greenaway Medal Commended
- 2002, Who's Afraid of the Big Bad Book?, Kate Greenaway Medal shortlisted

== Notes ==
Cultural offices
Preceded by Chris Riddell	Children's Laureate of the United Kingdom; 2017–2019	Succeeded by Cressida Cowell
