= Fergus Crane =

2004 children's book by Paul Stewart

- Author: Paul Stewart
- Illustrator: Chris Riddell
- Language: English
- Series: Far-Flung Adventures
- Genre: Children's
- Publisher: Doubleday
- Publication date: 1 April 2004
- Publication place: United Kingdom
- Pages: 160 pp
- ISBN: 978-0-385-60719-3
- OCLC: 56447888
- Dewey Decimal: 823.914 22
- LC Class: PZ7.S84975 Fer 2004
- Followed by: Corby Flood

Fergus Crane is a 2004 children's book written by Paul Stewart and illustrated by Chris Riddell. It won the Nestlé Children's Book Prize Gold Award the same year.

== Plot summary ==
Fergus Crane is a young boy, who lives in the Archduke Ferdinand Apartments with his Mother Lucia. A mysterious little flying box arrives at his house three different times which has letters in it from his 'long lost uncle Theo', warning him that he is great danger and is sending help. After this, a flying horse arrives at his window and takes him to a magnificent mountain chalet, where his adventures begin.
