= Caroline Hardaker =

British author (born 1986)

- Born: 1986 (age 39–40); North East England
- Occupations: Poet; Novelist
- Writing career
- Period: 2015–present
- Genres: Science fiction; Horror
- Website: carolinehardakerwrites.com

Caroline Hardaker (born 1986) is an English poet and novelist. She was born in North East England, and currently lives in Newcastle upon Tyne. Hardaker has published two collections of her poems, Bone Ovation (2017) and Little Quakes Every Day (2017), described by John Clute as exploring "the permanence of Time, of bones, of the past within a fleece of transmutations". She has also published two science fiction/horror novels, Composite Creatures (2021), set in a near future damaged by climate change, and Mothtown (2023), about loneliness, grief and escape to the multiverse.

Composite Creatures was shortlisted for the 2022 Kitschies Award for Best Debut Novel. It was also selected by Silvia Moreno-Garcia and Lavie Tidhar as one of the best science fiction, fantasy and horror books of 2021 for The Washington Post.

== Bibliography ==
=== Novels ===
- Composite Creatures (Angry Robot, 2021) – shortlisted for the 2022 Kitschies Award for Best Debut Novel
- Mothtown (Angry Robot, 2023)

=== Poetry collections ===
- Bone Ovation (Valley Press, 2017)
- Little Quakes Every Day (Valley Press, 2017)
