= Chris Riddell =

South African-born English illustrator (born 1962)

Chris Riddell OBE FRSL
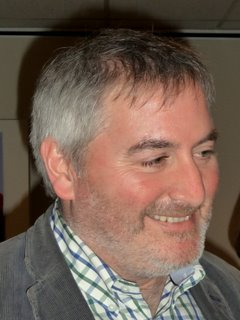
- Riddell in 2010
- Born: 13 April 1962 (age 64); Cape Town, South Africa
- Education: Brighton Polytechnic
- Occupations: Illustrator, author, political cartoonist
- Spouse: Joanne Burroughes
- Children: 3
- Writing career
- Genre: Children's

Chris Riddell OBE FRSL (/rɪdˈɛl/ rid-EL) (born 13 April 1962) is a South African-born English illustrator and occasional writer of children's books and a political cartoonist for the Observer. He has won three Kate Greenaway Medals – the British librarians' annual award for the best-illustrated children's book, and two of his works were commended runners-up, a distinction dropped after 2002. (Note: Today there are usually eight books on the Greenaway shortlist. According to CCSU, some runners-up through 2002 were Commended (from 1959) or Highly Commended (from 1974). There were 29 highly commended runners-up in 24 years to 2002, including Riddell and Lauren Child in 1999. During that time there were about three annual commendations of both kinds; two in 1994. • Riddell is the first author to have won three Greenaways.)

Books that he wrote or illustrated have won three Nestlé Smarties Book Prizes and have been silver or bronze runners-up four times. On 9 June 2015, he was appointed the UK Children's Laureate.

== Life ==
Chris Riddell was born in 1962 in Cape Town, South Africa, where his father was a "liberal Anglican vicar" and was opposed to the system of apartheid. The family returned to England when Chris was one year old, where he spent the rest of his childhood with his sister and three brothers, who now live in South Africa, Brighton, and Egypt. He attended Archbishop Tenison's Grammar School in Kennington. Chris displayed artistic talent from an early age and was encouraged in this by his mother. (She gave him paper and pen to keep quiet during his father's sermons.) As a child, he admired the work of Sir John Tenniel, the first illustrator of Alice in Wonderland, and W. Heath Robinson. At Brighton Polytechnic, he studied illustration; one teacher was Raymond Briggs, an earlier winner of two Greenaway Medals.

Riddell worked as an illustrator at The Economist in the 1980s, and at the Observer starting in 1995.

In 2002, he named as influences Tenniel and E. H. Shepard, the first illustrator of The Wind in the Willows and Winnie the Pooh.

As of 2019, Riddell and his wife, Joanne Burroughes, an illustrator and print-maker, live in Brighton with three children. They also have a second home in rural Norfolk where Joanne is from. Daughter Katy Riddell is also a children's book illustrator, including of Pongwiffy by Kaye Umansky.

His brother Rick Riddell, a secondary teacher at the Alice Smith School, died in February 2012.

== Career ==
=== The Edge Chronicles ===
Some of Riddell's most celebrated work are The Edge Chronicles (1998), a children's book series co-written with Paul Stewart and illustrated by Riddell. Set in the fictional world known as "The Edge", the books have been praised for Riddell's beautifully detailed line drawings and the unique nature of their collaborative writing process.

=== Other works ===
For his illustrations, Riddell was a commended runner-up for the 1994 Kate Greenaway Medal (Something Else by Kathryn Cave) and highly commended for 1999 (Castle Diary by Richard Platt).

He won the 2001 Medal for illustrating Pirate Diary: The Journal of Jake Carpenter by Platt. The press release called Pirate Diary the first "information book" to win the Medal since 1975 and "a fictionalised account" when he spoke with author Richard Platt the harsh necessities of historical accuracy came into play. 'Everything I got excited about got shot down. No parrots, eye-patches or wooden legs. Thank god there were weapons and amputations!' (quoting Riddell). (After Castle Diary and Pirate Diary, Platt continued the Diary series with illustrator David Parkins.)

Three years later, Riddell won the Greenaway again, this time for his work on Jonathan Swift's "Gulliver" (Walker, 2004), retold by Martin Jenkins from the 1726 classic Gulliver's Travels. The panel chair commented, "Gulliver is a tour de force. Chris Riddell has given us 144 pages of fantastic, faultless illustrations, which constantly extend the power of the text. Our winning title also proves that today's picture books are not just for the youngest age-groups, but are [also] an important source of pleasure and learning for readers of all ages." (The 2001 and 2004 panels recommended Pirate Diary and Gulliver for readers age 8+ and 10+, while their recommendations for thirteen other shortlisted books ranged from 2+ to 7+.)

Other books illustrated by Chris Riddell include Fergus Crane, Corby Flood, and Hugo Pepper, all set in the same world. These books were also co-written with Paul Stewart. Stewart and Riddell also collaborated on Muddle Earth and the Barnaby Grimes series. Most recently, Riddell has both written and illustrated the Ottoline series, written while he was on holiday visiting his brother in Malaysia. The first book, Ottoline and the Yellow Cat (2007), won the final Smarties Prize in age category 6–8 years (the Smarties were discontinued in 2008). It has been followed by Ottoline Goes to School and Ottoline at Sea.

A 2023 cartoon by Riddell shortly after the first anniversary of the Russian invasion of Ukraine. Russian President Vladimir Putin is depicted cuddling a Soviet flag and holding a limp anniversary cake; the Grim Reaper perches over his shoulder and tells him "we both know how this ends..."

Beside writing and illustrating books, Riddell is a political cartoonist for the Observer newspaper in London, where his caricatures of politicians from John Major to Gordon Brown, Bill Clinton to George W. Bush, have earned him a reputation as a fine draughtsman and acute commentator on the political scene. Before working at the Observer, Chris spent time working at the Economist as an illustrator and occasional cover artist.

Chris Riddell is the cover artist for the Literary Review magazine formerly edited by Auberon Waugh, a role he took over from the late Willie Rushton. Chris's serial gag cartoon for this magazine, called "Illustration to Unwritten Books", was published in book form as The Da Vinci Cod and Other Illustrations to Unwritten Books.

In November 2017, Riddell publicly accused department store chain John Lewis of plagiarizing elements of his 1986 picture book Mr Underbed for their Christmas advert "Moz the Monster". The chain defended the allegations, noting that the concept of a monster who lived under a child's bed was a common literary trope, and that both works had dissimilar plots. The row led to renewed interest in the book, with copies quickly selling out from stores.

== Selected works ==
=== As author and illustrator ===
- Ben and the Bear (1986)
- Mr Underbed (1986)
- Bird's New Shoes (1987)
- The Fibbs (1987)
- The Trouble With Elephants (1988)
- The Wish Factory (1988)
- When the Walrus Comes (1989)
- The Bear Dance (1990)
- The Wonderful World of Zoom (1995)
- Puzzle Boy (1996)
- My Busy Book (1998)
- Tribal Politics (1999)
- The Da Vinci Cod (2005)
- The Emperor of Absurdia (2006)
- Wendel's Workshop (2007)
- Chris Riddell's Doodle-a-Day (2015)
- 100 Hugs (2017)
- Travels with My Sketchbook (2017)
- Once Upon A Wild Wood (2018)
- Timorous Beasts (2021)
- A Mermaid's Diary (2025)
- The World of Mr. Munroe (2025)
- A Mermaid's Rescue (2026)
- A Mermaid's Treasure Hunt (2027)
- Humphrey:
  - Humphrey the Hippo (1986)
  - Humphrey of the Rovers (1986)
  - Humphrey Goes to the Ball (1986)
  - Humphrey's New Trousers (1986)
- Platypus:
  - Platypus (2001)
  - Platypus and the Lucky Day (2002)
  - Platypus and the Birthday Party (2003)
- Ottoline:
  - Ottoline and the Yellow Cat (2007)
  - Ottoline Goes to School (2008)
  - Ottoline at Sea (2010)
  - Ottoline and the Purple Fox (2016)
- Alienography:
  - Alienography or How to spot an alien and what to do about it (2010)
  - Alienography – Tips for Tiny Tyrants (2012)
- Goth Girl:
  - Goth Girl and the Ghost of a Mouse (2013)
  - Goth Girl and the Fete Worse than Death (2014)
  - Goth Girl and the Wuthering Fright (2015)
  - Goth Girl and the Pirate Queen (2015 World Book Day edition)
  - Goth Girl and the Sinister Symphony (2017)
- The Sleep Of Reason:
  - The Sleep Of Reason Volume I (2019)
  - The Sleep Of Reason Volume II (2020)
  - The Sleep Of Reason Volume III (2021)
- The Cloud Horse Chronicles:
  - Guardians of Magic (2019)
  - Tiggy Thistle and the Lost Guardians (2022)
- Five Years... A Sketchbook of Political Drawings:
  - Five Years... A Sketchbook of Political Drawings - Volume I 2020 (2021)
  - Five Years... A Sketchbook of Political Drawings - Volume II 2021 (2022)
  - Five Years... A Sketchbook of Political Drawings - Volume III 2022 (2023)
  - Five Years... A Sketchbook of Political Drawings - Volume IV 2023 (2024)
  - Five Years... A Sketchbook of Political Drawings - Volume V 2024 (2025)

=== As illustrator ===
Riddell has collaborated with Paul Stewart on dozens of books, including the Edge Chronicles series. He has also illustrated several books written by each of five other authors.

written by other authors

- The Mystery of Silver Mountain (1984)
- Beware, Princess! (1986)
- Love Forty (1986)
- Dreamboat Brontosaurus (1987)
- Gruesome Giants (1987)
- The Magician's Cat (1987)
- Beyond the Rolling River (1988)
- Dracula's Daughter (1988)
- Moon Whales (1988)
- Peter Pan (1988), an edition of the 1911 J. M. Barrie classic
- Treasure Island (1988), an edition of the 1883 R. L. Stevenson classic
- The Pirates of Pudding Beach (1989)
- Manifold Manor (1989)
- You're Thinking About Doughnuts (1989)
- Ffangs the Vampire Bat and the Kiss of Truth (1990)
- The Prism Tree (1990)
- Lizzie Dripping and the Witch (1991)
- Patrick in Person (1991)
- Best Enemies (1992)
- The Thing in the Sink (1992)
- An Armful of Bears (1993)
- A Trunkful of Elephants (1994)
- Rent-a-Friend (1994)
- Say Hello to the Buffalo (1994)
- The Iron Wolf (1995)
- Angus Rides the Goods Train (1996)
- Brilliant Minds (1996)
- Buddhism for Sheep (1996)
- Feng Shui for Cats (1997)
- Feng Shui for Dogs (1997)
- The Castle of Inside Out (1997)
- The Swan's Stories (1997)
- The Tall Story (1997)
- Until I Met Dudley (1997)
- Buddhism for Bears (1998)
- Buster's Diaries (1998)
- Management for Martians (1998)
- Stories for Me! (1998)
- Castle Diary (1999), by Richard Platt
- The Tao for Babies (2000)
- Pirate Diary (2001), by Richard Platt
- The Rabbits' Rebellion (2001)
- Three Scary Stories (2001)
- Hairy Bill (2002)
- Un Italiano in America (2003)
- Jonathan Swift's "Gulliver" (2004), Gullivers Travels (1726) adapted by Martin Jenkins
- Politics Cutting Through the Crap (2006)
- Don Quixote (2010), Don Quixote (1605) adapted by Martin Jenkins
- Just So Stories (2013), an edition of the 1902 Rudyard Kipling classic
- The Pied Piper of Hamelin (2014), by Russell Brand
- The Box of Demons (2015), by Daniel Whelan
- Things You Find in a Poet's Beard (2015), by A. F. Harrold
- Island (2015), by Nicky Singer
- My Little Book of Big Freedoms (2015)
- The Hunting of the Snark (2016), an illustrated edition of The Hunting of the Snark (1876) by Lewis Carroll
- The Castle of Inside Out (2016), by David Henry Wilson
- The Lie Tree (2016), by Frances Hardinge
- I Killed Father Christmas (2017), by Anthony McGowan
- How To Stop Time (2017), by Matt Haig
- A Kid in My Class (2018), by Rachel Rooney
- Poems to Live Your Life By (2018)
- The Tales of Beedle The Bard (2018), by J.K. Rowling
- Poems to Fall in Love With (2019)
- The Greenhill Dictionary of Military Quotations (2020), edited by Peter G. Tsouras
- Poems to Save the World With (2020)
- Alice's Adventures in Wonderland (2020), an illustrated edition of Alice's Adventures in Wonderland (1865) by Lewis Carroll
- DOCTOR WHO: Adventures in Lockdown (2020), by Chris Chibnall, Paul Cornell, Russell T Davies, Neil Gaiman, Mark Gatiss, Pete McTighe, Steven Moffat, Vinay Patel, Joy Wilkinson
- The Hitchhiker's Guide to the Galaxy (2021), by Douglas Adams
- Indigo Takes Flight (2021), by Krista M. Lambert
- Through the Looking-Glass, and What Alice Found There (2021), an illustrated edition of Through the Looking-Glass (1871) by Lewis Carroll
- Booklet for the vinyl releases of Punisher (album) by Phoebe Bridgers
- Arthur: The Always King (2021), by Kevin Crossley-Holland
- The Big Amazing Poetry Book (2022)
- We Wish You A Merry Christmas and other festive poems (2022)
- A Passing On of Shells: 50 Fifty-Word Poems (2023), by Simon Lamb
- The Little Prince (2023), an illustrated edition of The Little Prince (1943) by Antoine de Saint-Exupéry
- The Restaurant at the End of the Universe (2023), by Douglas Adams
- Gods and Monsters - Mythological Poems (2023), by Ana Sampson
- Mothtown (2023), by Caroline Hardaker
- Heroes and Villains: Poems About Legends (2024), by Ana Sampson
- King Alfred and the Ice Coffin (2024), by Kevin Crossley-Holland
- Fresh (2026), by Rhiannon Oliver
- I Will Haunt This (2026), by Viviane Schwarz

written by Paul Stewart

- The Edge Chronicles:
  - Beyond the Deepwoods (1998)
  - Stormchaser (1999)
  - Midnight Over Sanctaphrax (2000)
  - Cloud Wolf (2001) - Side story
  - The Curse of the Gloamglozer (2001)
  - The Last of the Sky Pirates (2002)
  - Vox (2003)
  - Freeglader (2004)
  - The Edge Chronicles Maps (2004)
  - The Winter Knights (2005)
  - The Stone Pilot (2006) - Side story
  - Clash of the Sky Galleons (2006)
  - The Lost Barkscrolls (2006)
  - The Immortals (2009)
  - The Nameless One (2014)
  - Doombringer (2015)
  - The Descenders (2019)
- Rabbit and Hedgehog Stories:
  - A Little Bit of Winter (1998)
  - The Birthday Presents (1999)
  - Rabbit's Wish (2001)
  - What Do You Remember? (2002)
- The Blobheads:
  - Invasion of the Blobs (February 2000)
  - Talking Toasters (February 2000)
  - School Stinks (March 2000)
  - Beware of the Babysitter (April 2000)
  - Garglejuice (May 2000)
  - Silly Billy (June 2000)
  - Naughty Gnomes (July 2000)
  - Purple Alert! (August 2000)
- Muddle Earth:
  - Book 1: Muddle Earth (2003)
    - Muddle Earth Book/Section 1: Engelbert the Enormous
    - Muddle Earth Book/Section 2: Here be Dragons
    - Muddle Earth Book/Section 3: Doctor Cuddles of Giggle Glade
  - Book 2: Muddle Earth Too (2011)
    - Muddle Earth Too Book/Section 1: Down with Stinkyhogs
    - Muddle Earth Too Book/Section 2: Pesticide the Flower Fairy
    - Muddle Earth Too Book/Section 3: Trouble with Big Sisters
- Free Lance:
  - Free Lance and the Lake of Skulls (2003)
  - Free Lance and the Field of Blood (2004)
  - Free Lance and the Dragon's Hoard (2005)
- Far-Flung Adventures:
  - Fergus Crane (2004)
  - Corby Flood (2005)
  - Hugo Pepper (2006)
- Barnaby Grimes:
  - Barnaby Grimes: Curse of the Nightwolf (2007)
  - Barnaby Grimes: Return of the Emerald Skull (2008)
  - Barnaby Grimes: Legion of the Dead (2008)
  - Barnaby Grimes: Phantom of Blood Alley (2009)
- Wyrmeweald Trilogy:
  - Wyrmeweald Book 1: Returner's Wealth (2010)
  - Wyrmeweald Book 2: Bloodhoney (2012)
  - Wyrmeweald Book 3: The Bone Trail (2013)
- Scavenger Series:
  - Scavenger: Zoid (2014)
  - Scavenger: Chaos Zone (2015)
  - Scavenger: Mind Warp (2016)

written by Andrew William Gibson

- Ellis and the Hummick (1989)
- The Abradizil (1990)
- Jemima, Grandma and the Great Lost Zone (1991)
- The Rollickers and Other Stories (1992)
- The Amazing Witherspoon's Amazing Circus Crew (1993)
- Chegwith Skillet Escapes (1995)

written by Kathryn Cave

- Henry Hobbs, Alien (1990)
- Out for the Count (1991)
- Andrew Takes the Plunge (1994)
- Something Else (1994) - UNESCO prize, 1997
- Jumble (1995)
- The Emperor's Gruckle Hound (1996)
- Horatio Happened (1998)
- William and the Wolves (1999)
- Septimus Similon, Practising Wizard (2000)
- Henry Hobbs, Space Voyager (2001)
- Henry Hobbs and the Lost Planet (2002)

written by Philip Ridley

- Kasper in the Glitter (1994)
- Meteorite Spoon (1994)
- Dakota of the White Flats (1995)
- Mercedes Ice (1995)
- Dreamboat Zing (1996)
- Scribbleboy (1997)
- ZinderZunder (1998)

written by Brian Patten

- Beowulf and the Monster (1999)
- Juggling With Gerbils (2000)
- The Story Giant (2002)
- Gargling With Jelly (2003)
- Thawing Frozen Frogs (2003)
- The Utter Nutters (2007)

written by Neil Gaiman

- The Graveyard Book (2008)
- The Sleeper and the Spindle (2013) - Kate Greenaway Medal winner, 2016
- Fortunately, the Milk... (2013)
- Coraline (2013)
- Odd and the Frost Giants (2016)
- Neverwhere (2017)
- Art Matters: Because Your Imagination Can Change The World (2018)
- Pirate Stew (2020)
- What You Need to Be Warm (2023)

written by Michael Rosen

- A Great Big Cuddle: Poems for the Very Young (2015)
- Many Different Kinds of Love (2021)
- Michael Rosen's Pocket Shakespeare (2025)

written by Francesca Gibbons

- A Clock of Stars:
  - A Clock of Stars: The Shadow Moth (2020)
  - A Clock of Stars: Beyond the Mountains (2021)
  - A Clock of Stars: The Greatest Kingdom (2022)

== Awards and recognitions ==
Some of these awards and related honours may have recognised the writers of books Riddell illustrated. The three Greenaway Medals, two commendations, and three shortlists recognised Riddell as illustrator.

Awards

- 1997 Something Else, written by Kathryn Cave, won the UNESCO Prize for Children's and Young People's Literature in the Service of Tolerance. Later in a TV in 13.9.2001. (ages 3-6).
- 2001 Pirate Diary, written by Richard Platt, won the Kate Greenaway Medal.
- 2003 Pirate Diary won the Blue Peter Book Award, Best Book with Facts.
- 2004 Jonathan Swift's "Gulliver", adapted by Martin Jenkins from the 1726 classic, won the Kate Greenaway Medal.
- 2004 Fergus Crane, written by Paul Stewart, Nestlé Smarties Book Prize (ages 6–8) and the Smarties Prize "4Children Special Award".
- 2007 Ottoline and the Yellow Cat, written and illustrated by Riddell, won the Nestlé Smarties Book Prize (ages 6–8).
- 2008 Ottoline and the Yellow Cat won a Red House Children's Book Award.
- 2013 Goth Girl and the Ghost of a Mouse won the Costa Book Awards (Children's category).
- 2016 The Sleeper and the Spindle, written by Neil Gaiman and illustrated by Riddell, won the Kate Greenaway Medal. This made him become the first ever triple winner of the award.
- 2019 Appointed an Officer of the Order of the British Empire for services to illustration and charity.
- 2026 Elected a Fellow of the Royal Society of Literature (FRSL).

Runners-up, etc.

- 1994 Something Else by Cave was commended for the Greenaway Medal.
- 1999 Castle Diary by Platt was highly commended for the Greenaway Medal.
- 2002 Pirate Diary by Platt was Smarties silver runner-up (ages 6–8).
- 2005 Corby Flood by Stewart was Smarties bronze runner-up (ages 6–8).
- 2006 Hugo Pepper by Stewart was Smarties silver runner-up (ages 6–8).
- 2006 The Emperor of Absurdia, written and illustrated by Riddell, was Smarties silver runner-up (ages 0–5).
- 2007 The Emperor of Absurdia made the Greenaway shortlist.
- 2008 Ottoline and the Yellow Cat, written and illustrated by Riddell, made the Greenaway shortlist.
- 2008 Wendel's Workshop, written and illustrated by Riddell, made the Booktrust Early Years Award shortlist.
- 2010 The Graveyard Book, written by Neil Gaiman, made the Greenaway shortlist in its Children's Edition illustrated by Riddell. (Note: Dave McKean illustrated the UK Adult Edition and the US edition of The Graveyard Book.) (Gaiman won the companion Carnegie Medal).

== Notes ==
Cultural offices
Preceded by Malorie Blackman	Children's Laureate of the United Kingdom; 2015–2017	Succeeded by Lauren Child
