= The Edge Chronicles =

Children's fantasy novel series by Paul Stewart and Chris Riddell

- Author: Paul Stewart
- Illustrator: Chris Riddell
- Language: English
- Genre: High fantasy; Adventure novel; Steampunk
- Publisher: Doubleday
- Published: 1998 – present
- Media type: Print (Hardback & Paperback)

The Edge Chronicles is a children's fantasy novel series written by Paul Stewart and illustrated by Chris Riddell. It consists of four trilogies, plus four additional books, and other books related to the universe (The Edge). The series was originally published by Doubleday, a subsidiary of Penguin Random House, and has sold more than three million copies, according to its publisher.

The stories of The Edge Chronicles take place in the fictional world of The Edge, a vast cliff with no apparent bottom. The majority of books are grouped into sagas, with each saga focusing on one character. The power of flight is a major theme of the books, with each age defined by the current technology used for air travel. In the first age, floating rocks were used to stay airborne, then floating wood was used, and finally phrax-power. The series is notable for its flora and fauna, along with the maps of various locations in The Edge.

The first three trilogies were released over the course of 1998 to 2006, with a standalone saga serving as a conclusion to the first two ages of flight and a beginning to the third released in 2009. The series was planned to end after the tenth book, with the author's blog, Weird New Worlds serving as the continuous adventures with weekly 'chapter' installments. After the completion of the 66 chapters of the blog, the authors decided to revisit the series with the fourth trilogy which would adapt the characters and stories from the blog, with the first and second books released in 2014 and 2015 respectively, and the third in 2019. The series also includes a number of short stories, along with a companion book.

== Books ==
=== The Quint Trilogy ===
- The Curse of the Gloamglozer: the novel was first published in 2001. It is the fourth volume of chronicles and the first of the Quint Saga trilogy; within the stories' own chronology it is the first novel, preceding the Twig Saga trilogy that was published earlier.
- The Winter Knights: first published in 2005, it is the eighth volume of chronicles and the second of the Quint Saga trilogy; within the stories' own chronology it is the second novel, preceding the Twig Saga and Rook Saga trilogies that were published earlier.
- Clash of the Sky Galleons: first published in 2006, it is the ninth volume of chronicles and the third of the Quint Saga trilogy; within the stories' own chronology, it is the third novel.

=== The Twig Trilogy ===
- Beyond the Deepwoods (1998)
- Stormchaser: first published in 1999, it is the second volume of chronicles and of the Twig Saga trilogy; within the stories' own chronology it is the fifth novel, following the Quint Saga trilogy that was published later.
- Midnight Over Sanctaphrax: first published in 2000, it is the third volume of the chronicles and of the Twig Saga trilogy; within the stories' own chronology it is the sixth novel.

=== The Rook Trilogy ===
- The Last of the Sky Pirates (2002)
- Vox (2003)
- Freeglader (2004)

=== The Immortals ===
The Immortals is the 10th book of The Edge Chronicles and was released on 5 February 2009 in the United Kingdom and 14 September 2010 in the United States and Canada. The book introduces the Third Age of Flight and the character Nate Quarter, and serves as a conclusion to the Quint, Twig and Rook sagas.

=== The Cade Trilogy ===
- The Nameless One: first published in 2014, it is the eleventh volume of the chronicles and the first of the Cade Saga trilogy; it is the first main series book since The Immortals. It introduces Nate Quarter's nephew, Cade Quarter as the new protagonist.
- Doombringer (2015)
- The Descenders (2019)

=== Standalone books ===
- Cloud Wolf (2001) - A short side story, specially published for World Book Day. Serves as a prequel to the Quint Trilogy.
- The Stone Pilot (2006) - A short side story, specially published for World Book Day.
- The Lost Barkscrolls (2006) an anthology that includes "Cloud Wolf" (2001), "The Stone Pilot" (2006) and two additional short stories from the series named "The Slaughterer's Quest" set between the Twig and Rook trilogies, it follows an adventure of Rook's mother, Keris Barkwater, and "The Blooding of Rufus Filatine" set after Freeglader, it follows an adventure of Rufas Filantine, son of Xanth Filantine.
- The Edge Chronicles Maps (2004) a companion book to the series, detailing the Edge in the First and Second Age of Flight. It also contains a double-sided map: on one side the Edge in the First Age of Flight, on the other the Edge in the Second Age of Flight.

=== Other ===
The following titles are not available in book form.

- The Sky Chart: A Book of Quint (2014) (Available in digital form only)
- Weird New Worlds (2009-2011) (Story in blog form spanning 66 posts).

== Chronology ==
The Edge Chronicles books are not always released in chronological order. The following table summarizes the stories to date:

Order Chronologically	Story Title	Main Protagonist	Order Released	Year released	Book Number
1	Cloud Wolf*	Quintinius Verginix	4	2001	Side Story
2	Curse of the Gloamglozer	Quintinius Verginix	5	2001	04
3	The Winter Knights	Quintinius Verginix	9	2005	08
4	The Stone Pilot*	Maugin	10	2006	Side Story
5	Clash of the Sky Galleons	Quintinius Verginix	11	2006	09
6	The Sky Chart: A Book of Quint	Quintinius Verginix	15	2014	Maps
7	Beyond the Deepwoods	Arborinus Verginix (Twig)	1	1998	01
8	Stormchaser	Arborinus Verginix (Twig)	2	1999	02
9	Midnight Over Sanctaphrax	Arborinus Verginix (Twig)	3	2000	03
10	The Slaughterer's Quest*	Keris Barkwater	12	2006	Side Story
11	The Last of the Sky Pirates	Rook Barkwater	6	2002	05
12	Vox	Rook Barkwater	7	2003	06
13	Freeglader	Rook Barkwater	8	2004	07
14	The Blooding of Rufus Filatine*	Rufus Filatine	13	2006	Side Story
15	The Immortals	Nate Quarter	14	2009	10
16	The Nameless One	Cade Quarter	16	2014	11
17	Doombringer	Cade Quarter	17	2015	12
18	The Descenders	Cade Quarter	18	2019	13

* Part of The Lost Barkscrolls (Also marked by "Side Story" in book number column). Cloud Wolf and The Stone Pilot were also released separately as individual novellas previously.

The Stone Pilot is told from the narrative of Maugin reminiscing on her past. Content of this story falls chronologically fourth while the story is told by Maugin at a later point in time, likely around the end of The Last of the Sky Pirates.

The Edge Chronicles Maps Detail 'The Edge' during the first and second age of flight covering a time period from before Cloud Wolf until some point in time between The Blooding of Rufus Filatine and The Immortals.

== Family tree ==
The Edge Chronicles family tree

Orlis “Wind Jackal”
Lucius Verginix

Hirmina Verginix (née Lintrax)	Yena Pallitax (née Vespius)	Linius Pallitax (Most High Academe of Sanctaphrax)
Centix Verginix	Murix Verginix	Pellius Verginix	Martilius Verginix	Quint “Cloud Wolf” (Quintinius Verginix)	Maris Verginix (née Pallitax)
Tem Barkwater	Cal Barkwater	Noll Barkwater (née Hammelherd)	Loess
Sinew Verginix (née Tatum)	Twig (Arborinus Verginix)	Maugin “The Stone Pilot”
Shem Barkwater	Keris Barkwater (née Verginix)
Magda Burlix	Rook Barkwater
Multiple Generations
Hermia Lentis	Abe Quarter	Phasia Hexatine
Eudoxia Prade	Nate Quarter	Thadeus Quarter	Sensa Huth
Cade Quarter

== Origins ==
The origins of the series came in 1994, when Riddell drew a map of a fantasy world and challenged Stewart to write a story about it. The series was produced with Riddell and Stewart working in collaboration, sometimes with the illustrations influencing the text and vice versa. In terms of influence, they claimed the tales of the Brothers Grimm and Mervyn Peake's Gormenghast as creative influences on their work. They deliberately designed the Edge to be a world that would be markedly very different from traditional high fantasy, and one of the ways they designed it was to avoid the depiction of magic or any other supernatural forces, since they felt it would be far too convenient if magic was used.

== Audiobooks ==
The series has received numerous audiobooks, which have often been abridged. An audiobook of The Curse of the Gloamglozer was released narrated by British actor Alex Jennings. An audiobook adaptation of The Last of the Sky Pirates was released in 2009, narrated by Peter Jennings, which the website Through the Looking Glass Children's Book Reviews called "spirited narration". In addition, an audiobook of Beyond the Deepwoods was released in 2002, which was narrated by actor Clive Mantle, as part of the BBC's Cover-to-Cover line of cassette tapes.

== Critical reception ==
The novels have been well-regarded among the fanbase, with an article from The Guardian praising the imaginative world-building and well-paced action. The series ranked on number 15 of the best fantasy books of all time, according to The Mirror. The novels have also won praise for their unique fantasy world from several resources, with the critics acknowledging that the illustrations complement the narratives of the novels. To date, more than three million copies of the novels have been sold worldwide.

== See also ==
- The Edge Chronicles: Twig Saga
- The Edge Chronicles: Rook Barkwater Saga
