= Paul Stewart (writer) =

British writer (born 1955)

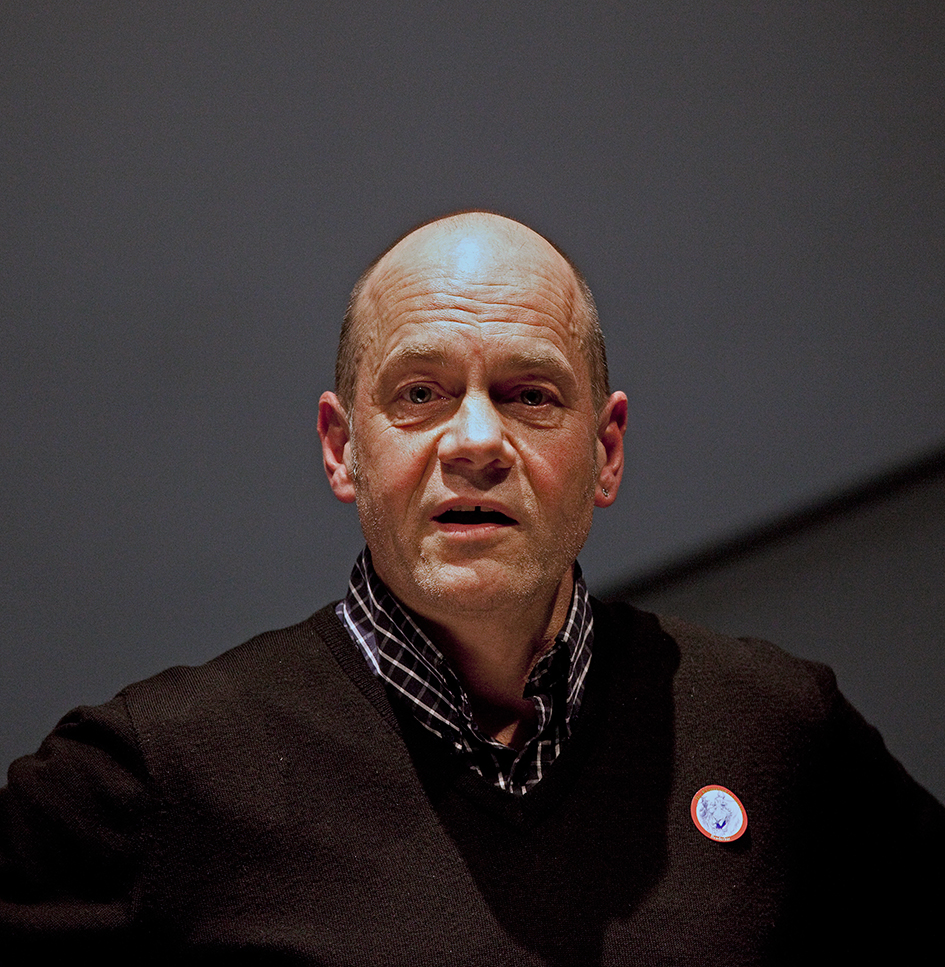
- Stewart in 2010
- Born: June 1955 (age 70–71); London, England
- Education: English (B.A); Creative Writing (M.A)
- Alma mater: University of Lancaster (B.A); University of East Anglia (M.A)
- Occupation: Writer
- Writing career
- Genres: Children's, young adult, and adult novels
- Notable works: The Edge Chronicles; Far Flung Adventures (with Chris Riddell)
- Notable awards: Nestlé Smarties Book Prize; 2004
- Website: edgechronicles.co.uk//

Paul Stewart (born June 1955) is a writer of children's books, best known for three series written in collaboration with the illustrator Chris Riddell: The Edge Chronicles, the Free Lance novels, and the Far Flung Adventures series.

== Background ==
Stewart was born in London in 1955. His family lived first in Muswell Hill, North London and later in Morden, South London, where he went to school. His favourite subject at school was English and he hated Mathematics. When Stewart left school, he went travelling, spending several months in Greece, where he took various jobs, including picking oranges and grapes, and whitewashing hotels.

From 1974 to 1977, Stewart studied at the University of Lancaster, majoring in English, (which included a Creative Writing unit) with a minor in Religious Education. On graduation, he went travelling again, before enrolling in 1978 to do an M.A. in Creative Writing with Angela Carter and Malcolm Bradbury at the University of East Anglia. He went to Heidelberg, Germany in 1979 for three years, both as a teacher of English and as a student at Heidelberg University, learning German. In 1982, he went to Sri Lanka to teach English as a foreign language returning to the UK a year later where he continued to teach (1983–90) before becoming a full-time writer.

Stewart's first book to be published was The Thought Domain (1988) which was then followed by a number of other children's and young adult novels, chiefly in the thriller, horror and SF/Fantasy genres. Stewart's only adult book to date, Trek, was published in 1991.

== Literary influences ==
Stewart's favourite books when a child were The Phantom Tollbooth by Norton Juster, Lewis Carroll's Alice in Wonderland, Rupert Bear Annuals, and the works of Alan Garner, especially Elidor. He also read a lot of science fiction.

Stewart started writing at a very young age. At the age of seven he was writing a series about a snail called Oliver and he started a sequel to The Phantom Tollbooth at ten. Some of the ideas from this early work were later developed and became the basis of The Thought Domain which was published in 1988.

== Collaboration with Chris Riddell ==
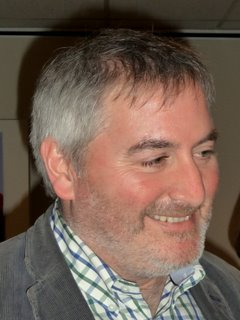
Riddell in 2010

Stewart first met Chris Riddell in 1993, through having children at the same school. Riddell was looking for someone to write texts that he could illustrate. Stewart had already had a number of books published. Their first collaborative work were the Rabbit and Hedgehog books (published 1998–2003 by Andersen Press). The inspiration for The Edge Chronicles came from a map Riddell drew of an imaginary world in 1994 and then challenged Stewart to write about it. The first book in the sequence, Beyond the Deepwoods, was commissioned by Transworld Publishers (now part of the Random House Group) on the basis of the map and the first four chapters. The book then took three years to write as Stewart and Riddell worked out both the plot and how best to work together. Originally commissioned as a single book, Stewart and Riddell hoped that it might become a trilogy. The series has now extended to fifteen full-length novels, five short stories, a book of maps and a now-defunct blog called Weird New Worlds. The final book, The Descenders, was released in 2019.

When writing together, Stewart and Riddell work on the development of plots and characters together, sometimes starting from a bit of writing, sometimes from an illustration on one of Riddell's sketchbooks. They have long conversations over many days, during which the novels emerge. They don't always agree and the debates can become quite heated but they have remained good friends. Following these discussions, Stewart normally writes a first draft, which Riddell will edit or rewrite before Stewart produces a final draft.

As well as The Edge Chronicles, Stewart and Riddell have also collaborated on a trilogy of shorter adventures, Freelance; a quartet of younger books, The Far Flung Adventures, the first of which, Fergus Crane, won the Nestlé Smarties Book Prize (Gold Medal) in 2004; The Blobheads series (2000–2004); Muddle Earth (2003), and a further quartet, Barnaby Grimes (2007–2009). Their latest novel, Wyrmeweald trilogy, was published by Doubleday Children's Books in April 2010.

== Personal life ==
Stewart lives in the British seaside city of Brighton with his wife and children, which, by coincidence, also happens to be the city where his co-creator Riddell resides.

== Awards ==
These three books constitute the Far Flung Adventures series, written by Stewart and illustrated by Riddell.

- 2004 Nestlé Smarties Book Prize Gold Medal, age category 6–8 years: Fergus Crane
- 2005 Nestlé Smarties Book Prize Silver Medal, age category 6–8 years: Corby Flood
- 2006 Nestlé Smarties Book Prize Silver Medal, age category 6–8 years: Hugo Pepper

== Bibliography ==
=== Fiction ===
- The Thought Domain, illustrated by Jon Riley. London: Viking, 1988; New York: Puffin, 1989
- The Weather Witch, illustrated by Jon Riley. London: Viking, 1989; New York: Puffin, 1990
- Adam's Ark, illustrated by Kevin Jones. London: Viking, 1990; New York: Puffin, 1992
- Giant Gutso and the Wacky Gang, illustrated by Colin West. London: Orchard, 1991
- Rory McCory's Nightmare Machine, illustrated by Paul Finn. London: Viking, 1992; New York: Puffin, 1993
- The Snowman Who Couldn't Melt, illustrated by Annabel Large. London: Viking, 1993; New York: Puffin, 1994
- Bubble and Shriek, illustrated by Annabel Large. London: Viking, 1993: New York: Puffin, 1995
- Castle of Intrigue, illustrated by Jane Gedye. London: Usborne, 1994
- Neighbourhood Witch, illustrated by Annabel Large. London: Viking, 1994; New York: Puffin, 1995
- Stage Fright, illustrated by Alan Marks. London: Usborne, 1995
- Brown Eyes. London: Penguin, 1996; new edition, Longman, 1999
- The Diary. London: Penguin, 1996
- The Clock of Doom. London: Usborne, 1996
- The Wakening. London: Yearling, 1996
- Football Mad series. London: Hippopotamus
  - Football Mad, 1997
  - Football Mad: Off-Side!, 1998
  - Football Mad: Hat-Trick!, 1999
  - Football Mad: Teamwork!, 2000
  - Football Mad: Own Goal!, 2020
- The Midnight Hand. London: Yearling, 1997
- Lucky Luke and Other very Short Stories. London: Penguin, 1997
- Dogbird, illustrated by Tony Ross. London: Corgi, 1998
- The Hanging Tree. London: Scholastic, 1998
- Millie's Party, illustrated by Bernard Lodge. London: Blue Bananas, 1999
- Freight Train. London: Scholastic, 2000
- Sausage, illustrated by Nick Ward. Oxford: Oxford University Press, 2002
- The Were-Pig, illustrated by Tony Ross. London: Corgi, 2002
- The Watch-Frog, illustrated by Tony Ross. London: Corgi, 2003

=== For adults ===
- Trek. London: Jonathan Cape, 1991; reissued Corgi, 2007

=== Picture books ===
- Rabbit & Hedgehog Series (all illustrated by Chris Riddell)
  - The Birthday Presents London: Andersen Press, 1998; New York: HarperCollins, 2000
  - A Little Bit of Winter. London: Andersen Press, 1998; New York: HarperCollins, 1999
  - Rabbit's Wish. London: Andersen Press, 2001; New York: HarperCollins, 2001
  - What Do You Remember?. London: Andersen Press, 2002
- Brian the Brave. Hereford: Otter-Barry Books, 2021

=== Fiction co-authored with Chris Riddell ===
- Muddle Earth. London: Macmillan, 2003; New York: Yearling, 2009
- Muddle Earth Too. London: Macmillan, 2011

==== The Edge Chronicles ====
- Beyond the Deepwoods. London: Doubleday, 1998; New York: David Fickling Books, 2004
- Stormchaser. London: Doubleday, 1999; New York: David Fickling Books, 2004
- Midnight Over Sanctaphrax. London: Doubleday, 2000; New York: David Fickling Books, 2004
- The Curse of the Gloamglozer. London: Doubleday, 2001; New York: David Fickling Books, 2005
- Cloud Wolf. (published for World Book Day 2001). London: Corgi, 2001
- The Last of the Sky Pirates. London: Doubleday, 2002; New York: David Fickling Books, 2005
- Vox. London: Doubleday, 2003; New York: David Fickling Books, 2005
- The Stone Pilot. (published for World Book Day 2006). London: Corgi, 2006
- Freeglader. London: Doubleday, 2004; New York: David Fickling Books, 2006
- The Winter Knights. London: Doubleday, 2005; New York: David Fickling Books, 2007
- Clash of the Skygalleons. London: Doubleday, 2006; New York: David Fickling Books, 2007
- The Lost Barkscrolls. London: Doubleday, 2007
- The Immortals. London: Doubleday, 2009; New York: David Fickling Books 2010
- The Nameless One - Book 1 of the Cade Saga. London: Doubleday, 2015
- Doombringer - Book 2 of the Cade Saga. London: Doubleday, 2015
- The Descenders - Book 3 of the Cade Saga. London: Doubleday, 2019

==== The Blobheads ====
All published by London: Macmillan.

- Invasion of the Blobs. 2000
- Talking Toasters. 2000
- School Stinks. 2000
- Beware of the Babysitter. 2000
- Garglejuice. 2000
- Silly Billy. 2000
- Naughty Gnomes. 2000
- Purple Alert!. 2000
- Blobheads go Boing! 2004

==== A Knight's Story ====
- Free Lance and the Lake of Skulls. London: Hodder, 2003; New York: (published as Lake of Skulls) Atheneum, 2004
- Free Lance and the Field of Blood. London: Hodder, 2004; New York: (published as Joust of Honor) Atheneum, 2005
- Free Lance and the Dragon's Hoard. London: Hodder, 2005; New York: (published as Dragon's Hoard) Atheneum, 2005

==== Far Flung Adventures ====
- Fergus Crane. London: Doubleday, 2004; New York: David Fickling Books, 2006
- Corby Flood. London: Doubleday, 2005; New York: David Fickling Books, 2006
- Hugo Pepper. London: Doubleday, 2006; New York: David Fickling Books, 2007

==== Barnaby Grimes ====
- Barnaby Grimes: The Curse of the Nightwolf. London: Doubleday, 2007; New York: David Fickling Books, 2008
- Barnaby Grimes: Return of the Emerald Skull. London: Doubleday, 2008; New York: David Fickling Books, 2009
- Barnaby Grimes: Legion of the Dead. London: Doubleday, 2008; New York: David Fickling Books, 2010
- Barnaby Grimes: Phantom of Blood Alley. London: Doubleday, 2009; New York: David Fickling Books, 2010

==== Wyrmeweald Trilogy ====
- Wyrmeweald: Returner's Wealth. London: Doubleday, 2010
- Wyrmeweald: Bloodhoney. London: Doubleday, 2012
- Wyrmeweald: The Bone Trail. London: Doubleday, 2013
