= List of World Book Day books =

This is a list of books released for World Book Day in the UK and Ireland. In 1998 and 1999 a specially created WBD anthology priced at £1 (€1.50 in Ireland) was published. In 2000, instead of a single £1 special anthology, four separate £1 books were published, covering a wider age-range. Since then, each year has seen a new set of special £1 books published.

From 2009 to 2011 flip books were published containing stories by two different authors one starting at each end of the book. 2012 saw the return of single story books and the first E-books published simultaneously.

== 2001 ==
- The Gruffalo Song by Julia Donaldson
- Cloud Wolf by Paul Stewart with illustrations by Chris Riddell
- Little Wolf's Postbag by Ian Whybrow
- Shop Dead by Kate Cann

== 2002 ==
- Room on the Broom Song (picture book) by Julia Donaldson and Axel Scheffler (Macmillan)
- Jungle Jingles by Dick King-Smith (Corgi)
- Viking at School by Jeremy Strong (Puffin)
- Stealer of Souls by Diana Wynne Jones (Collins)
- Where Your Wings Were by David Almond (Hodder)

== 2003 ==
- Duck's Day Out by Jez Alborough
- Tough it Out by Jenny Oldfield
- Last Polar Bears by Harry Horse
- Showstopper! by Geraldine McCaughrean
- Secret Princess Diaries by Meg Cabot
- An Eye for an Eye by Malorie Blackman

== 2004 ==
- Artemis Fowl: The Seventh Dwarf by Eoin Colfer (Puffin)
- Cool! by Michael Morpurgo (HarperCollins Children's Books)
- Felicity wishes: Fairy fluster by Emma Thomson (Hodder Children's Books)
- If I was Boss by Kes Gray and Nick Sharratt (Random House Children's Books)
- Molly Moon's Hypnotic Holiday by Georgia Byng (Macmillan Children's Books)
- The Magnificent Mummies by Tony Bradman with illustrations by Martin Chatterton (Egmont)

== 2005 ==
- Poppy Cat Loves Rainbows by Lara Jones (Macmillan)
- Night Flight for the Little Red Train by Benedict Blathwayt (Random House)
- Horrid Henry's Bedtime by Francesca Simon (Orion)
- The Flying Feeling by Hilary McKay (Hodder)
- Roald Dahl's Incredible Chocolate Box by Roald Dahl (Puffin)
- The Creature in the Case by Garth Nix (HarperCollins)

== 2006 ==
- Here Comes Harry and his Bucketful of Dinosaurs by Ian Whybrow and Adrian Reynolds
- Hannah The Happily-Ever-After Fairy by Daisy Meadows with illustrations by George Ripper
- How To Train Your Viking by Cressida Cowell
- The Mum Surprise by Gwyneth Rees
- The Stone Pilot by Paul Stewart and Chris Riddell
- Koyasan by Darren Shan

== 2007 ==
- Astrosaurs: Teeth of the T-Rex by Steve Cole (Random House Children's Books)
- Diamond Brothers: I Know What You Did Last Wednesday by Anthony Horowitz (Walker)
- Horrible Science: The Seriously Squishy Science Book by Nick Arnold and Tony De Saulles (Scholastic)
- Let the Snog Fest Begin!: Georgia Nicolson's Guide to Life and Luuurve by Louise Rennison (HarperCollins Children's Books)
- My Sister's Got a Spoon Up Her Nose by Jeremy Strong with illustrations by Rowan Clifford (Penguin)
- The Code of Romulus in The Roman Mysteries series by Caroline Lawrence (Orion Children's Books)
- Sharing a Shell Song Book by Julia Donaldson and Lydia Monks (Macmillan Children's Books)
- The Selfish Crocodile Counting Book by Michael Terry (Bloomsbury)
- The Tiara Club: Princess Megan and the Magical Tiara by Vivian French with illustrations by Sarah Gibb (Hachette Children's Books)
- Vampirates: Dead Deep by Justin Somper (Simon & Schuster Children's Books)

== 2008 ==
- Paddington Bear: Paddington Rules the Waves by Michael Bond (HarperCollins)
- Princess Poppy: The Fancy Dress Party by Janey Louise Jones (Corgi)
- Magic Kitten: A very Special Friend by Sue Bently (Puffin)
- Adventure According to Humphrey by Betty G Birney (Faber)
- Where's Wally? by Martin Handford (Walker)
- Jane Blonde: The Perfect Spylet by Jill Marshall (Macmillan)
- Captain Underpants and the Attack of the Talking Toilets by Dav Pilkey (Scholastic)
- Odd and the Frost Giants by Neil Gaiman (Bloomsbury)
- CHERUB: Dark Sun by Robert Muchamore (Hodder)

== 2009 ==
- The Tyrannosaurus Drip songbook (picture book) by Julia Donaldson and David Roberts (Macmillan Children's Books)
- Flip book containing Winnie to the Rescue! by Laura Owen and Korky Paul (Oxford University Press) and Yuck's Rotten Joke by Matt and Dave (Simon & Schuster Children's Books)
- Flip book containing Mr Gum and the Hound of Lamonic Bibber by Andy Stanton (Egmont Children's Books) and Beast Quest: Sephir the Storm Monster by Adam Blade (Orchard Books)
- Flip book containing Percy Jackson and the Sword of Hades by Rick Riordan (Puffin Books) and Horrible Histories: Groovy Greeks (WBD edition) by Terry Deary with illustrations by Martin Brown (Scholastic Children's Books)
- Flip book containing Interception Point by Mark Walden (Bloomsbury Children's Books) and The Spook's Tale by Joseph Delaney (Random House Children's Books)
- Flip book containing The Secret Story (Mates, Dates series) by Cathy Hopkins (Piccadilly Press) and Ten Stations by Jenny Valentine (HarperCollins Children's Books)

== 2010 ==
- Thomas & Friends: Thomas to the Rescue (picture book) (Egmont)
- Flip book containing The Medusa Project: The Thief by Sophie McKenzie (Simon & Schuster Children's Books) and Walking the Walls by Chris Higgins (Hodder Children's Books)
- Flip book containing Jamie Johnson: Born to Play by Dan Freedman (Scholastic) and Young Samurai: The Way of Fire by Chris Bradford (Puffin Books)
- Flip book containing Grubtown Tales: The Great Pasta Disaster by Philip Ardagh with illustrations by Jim Paillot (Faber & Faber) and Pongwiffy and the Important Announcement by Kaye Umansky with illustrations by Nick Price (Bloomsbury)
- Flip book containing Magic Ballerina: The Magic Dance by Darcey Bussell (HarperCollins Children's Books) and Kitten Chaos by Anna Wilson (Macmillan Children's Books)
- Flip book containing The Charlie Small Journals: Valley of Terrors (David Fickling Books) and Dinosaur Cove: Battle of the Giants by Rex Stone (Oxford University Press)

== 2011 ==
- Dr. Seuss on the Loose Dr. Seuss (HarperCollins)
- Flip book containing Gargoylz Make Some Noise by Burchett & Vogler (Random House Children's Books) and S.W.I.T.C.H Bug Battle by Ali Sparkes (Oxford University Press)
- Flip book containing Humphrey's Tiny Tales: My TreasureHunt Trouble by Betty Birney (Faber & Faber) and Winnie-the-Pooh World Book Day Special Edition by A. A. Milne with illustrations by E H Shepard (Egmont)
- Flip book containing The Great Pet Shop Panic by Katie Davies (Simon & Schuster) and Spy Dog's Got Talent by Andrew Cope (Puffin)
- Flip book containing Do Bugs Have Bottoms: and other important questions (and answers) from the Science Museum for World Book Day by Glenn Murphy (Macmillan Children's Books) and Evilution: The Troof – A Jiggy McCue story by Michael Lawrence (Orchard)
- Flip book containing Traction City by Philip Reeve (Scholastic Children's Books) and A Tale of Terror: A World Book Day Story by Chris Priestley (Bloomsbury)
- A bilingual book available only in Ireland for €1.50: Fiacla Mhamó/Danny's Smelly Toothbrush (O'Brien Press)

== 2012 ==
=== Books ===
- The What the Ladybird Heard Song a songbook by Julia Donaldson and Lydia Monks (Macmillan)
- Winnie Flies Again a Winnie the Witch story by Valerie Thomas and Korky Paul (Oxford University Press)
- Where's Wally Now by Martin Handford (Walker)
- Magic Molly: The Clever Little Kitten by Holly Webb (Scholastic)
- Roald Dahl's Fantabulous Facts by Roald Dahl with illustrations by Quentin Blake (Penguin)
- The Day of the Dreader a How To Train Your Dragon story by Cressida Cowell (Hodder Children's Books)
- The End of the World a Skulduggery Pleasant story by Derek Landy (HarperCollins)
- Big Day Out by Jacqueline Wilson with illustrations by Nick Sharratt (Random House)

=== Short stories ===
Via the free The World Book Day App released for iPhone and iPad six exclusive short stories were published.

- Callum by Malorie Blackman (Random House)
- Orange by Neil Gaiman (Bloomsbury)
- The Enemy: Geeks vs Zombies by Charlie Higson (Puffin)
- A Taste of Death by Anthony Horowitz (Walker Books)
- Acting Friends by Sophie McKenzie (Simon and Schuster)
- My Soul To Lose by Rachel Vincent (Harlequin)

== 2013 ==
- Giraffes Can't Dance: Colouring and Puzzle Fun by Giles Andreae and Guy Parker-Rees
- Horrid Henry's Guide to Perfect Parents by Francesca Simon
- Weird World of Wonders: Funny Inventions by Tony Robinson
- Alfie's Shop by Shirley Hughes
- The Chocolate Box Girls: Bittersweet by Cathy Cassidy
- Tom Gates: Best Book Day Ever! (so far) by Liz Pichon
- Hang in There Bozo: The Ruby Redfort Emergency Survival Guide for Some Tricky Predicaments by Lauren Child
- The Diamond Brothers in...Two of Diamonds by Anthony Horowitz
- Tony Robinson's Weird World Of Wonders: Funny Inventions

== 2014 ==
- Hello, Hugless Douglas! by David Melling (Hodder Children's Books)
- Little Book Day Parade by Emily Gravett (Macmillan Children's Books)
- Barry Loser: I Am ~~Not~~ Nit a Loser by Jim Smith (Egmont)
- Fun with the Worst Witch by Jill Murphy (Puffin)
- The Midnight Picnic: A Laura Marlin Mystery by Lauren St John (Orion)
- Horrible Histories: Terrible Trenches by Terry Deary and Martin Brown (Scholastic)
- Middle School: How I Got Lost in London by James Patterson (Young Arrow)
- Jack Pepper by Sarah Lean (Harper Collins)
- Rock War: The Audition by Robert Muchamore (Hodder Children's Books)
- The Boy in the Smoke (prequel to The Shades of London series) by Maureen Johnson (Hot Key Books)

== 2015 ==
- The Dinosaur That Pooped A Lot! by Tom Fletcher and Dougie Poynter (Random House)
- Elmer's Parade by David McKee (Andersen Press)
- A Pirate's Guide to Landlubbing by Jonny Duddle (Templar Publishing)
- Magic Animal Friends: Lucy Longwhiskers Finds a Friend by Daisy Meadows (Orchard)
- Goth Girl and the Pirate Queen by Chris Riddell (Macmillan)
- The Diary of Dennis the Menace: World Menace Day by Steven Butler (Puffin)
- Best Mates by Michael Morpurgo MBE (HarperCollins), contains the six short stories: It's a Dog's Life, Snug, Didn't We Have a Lovely Time?, Dolphin Boy, This Morning I Met a Whale
- Dork Diaries: How to be a Dork! by Rachel Renée Russell (Simon & Schuster)
- Geek Girl: Geek Drama by Holly Smale (HarperCollins)
- Killing the Dead by Marcus Sedgwick (Orion)

== 2016 ==
=== Nursery ===
- Kipper's Visitor by Mick Inkpen (Hachette)
- Supertato: Ha-pea ever after by Sue Hendra and Paul Linnet (Simon & Schuster)

=== KS1 ===
- Daisy and the Trouble With Jack by Kes Gray (PenguinRandomHouse)
- The Great Mouse Plot by Roald Dahl (PenguinRandomHouse)

=== KS2 ===
- Welcome to the World of Norm by Jonathan Meres (Hachette)
- Star Wars: Adventures in Wild Space: The Escape by Cavan Scott (Egmont)
- Harper and the Sea of Secrets by Cerrie Burnell (Scholastic)
- The Boy Who Could Do What He Liked by David Baddiel (HarperCollins)
- Stick Man by Julia Donaldson

=== KS3 ===
- Spot the Difference by James Dawson (Hot Key)
- Kindred Spirits by Rainbow Rowell by Rainbow Rowell (Macmillan)

== 2017 ==
=== Pre-School ===
- Peppa Loves World Book Day
- Everyone Loves Underpants by Claire Freedman

=== KS1 ===
- Where's Wally? The Fantastic Journey by Martin Handford
- The Famous Five: Good Old Tim and Other Stories by Enid Blyton
- Horrid Henry - Funny Fact Files by Francesca Simon
- Princess Mirror-Belle by Julia Donaldson

=== KS2 ===
- Butterfly Beach by Jacqueline Wilson
- Blob by David Walliams

=== KS3 ===
- Island by David Almond
- Dead of Night by Michael Grant

== 2018 ==
- Oi Goat! written by Kes Gray, illustrated by Jim Field
- My Book About Me By Mr Silly written by Adam Hargreaves
- Paddington Turns Detective and Other Funny Stories written by Michael Bond, illustrated by Peggy Fortnum
- Nadiya's Bake Me a Story written by Nadiya Hussain, illustrated by Clair Rossiter
- The Baby Brother From Outer Space! written by Pamela Butchart, illustrated by Thomas Flintham
- Terry's Dumb Dot Story: A Treehouse Tale written by Andy Griffiths, illustrated by Terry Denton
- Brain Freeze written by Tom Fletcher, illustrated by Shane Devries
- The Bolds' Great Adventure written by Julian Clary, illustrated by David Roberts
- The Girl Who Thought She Was a Dog written by Clare Balding, illustrated by Tony Ross
- Marvel Avengers The Greatest Heroes

== 2019 ==
- The Hundred and One Dalmatians: Cruella and Cadpig written by Peter Bently, illustrated by Steven Lenton (Egmont)
- Ten Little Bookworms written by Mike Brownlow, illustrated by Simon Rickerty (Orchard, Hachette)
- Hubert Horatio: A Very Fishy Tale written by Lauren Child (HarperCollins)
- LEGO Minifigure Mayhem written by Helen Murray and Beth Davies (Dorling Kindersley)
- Bad Mermaids Meet The Witches written by Sibéal Pounder, illustrated by Jason Cockcroft and Laura Ellen Anderson (Bloomsbury)
- Claude: Best In Show written by Alex T Smith (Hachette)
- Percy Jackson and the Singer of Apollo written by Rick Riordan (Penguin Random House)
- The Great Rocket Robbery written by Frank Cottrell-Boyce, illustrated by Steven Lenton (HarperCollins Children's Books)
- Diary of Greg Heffley's Best Friend written by Jeff Kinney (Penguin Random House)
- Everdark written by Abi Elphinstone (Simon & Schuster)
- Snap written by Patrice Lawrence (Hodder, Hachette)
- Nought Forever written by Malorie Blackman (Penguin Random House)

== 2020 ==
- Bing (HarperCollins)
- Supertato: Books Are Rubbish! written by Sue Hendra and Paul Linnet (Simon & Schuster)
- Amelia Fang and the Bookworm Gang written by Laura Ellen Anderson (Egmont)
- Dog Man written by Dav Pilkey (Scholastic)
- Evie in the Jungle written by Matt Haig, illustrated by Emily Gravett (Canongate)
- The Day We Met the Queen written by Onjali Q. Rauf (Hachette)
- Kid Normal and the Loudest Library written by Chris Smith and Greg James, illustrated by Erica Salcedo (Bloomsbury)
- The Case of the Drowned Pearl written by Robin Stevens (Penguin Random House)
- Alex Rider Undercover: The Classified Files written by Anthony Horowitz (Walker)
- My Awesome Guide to Getting Good At Stuff written by Matthew Syed, illustrated by Toby Triumph (Wren & Rook)
- Split written by Muhammad Khan (Macmillan)
- The Kissing Booth – Road Trip! written by Beth Reekles (Penguin Random House)

== 2021 ==
- There's a Wolf in Your Book written by Tom Fletcher, illustrated by Greg Abbott (Puffin Books)
- Luna Loves World Book Day written by Joseph Coelho, illustrated by Fiona Lumbers (Andersen Press)
- What the Ladybird Heard written by Julia Donaldson, illustrated by Lydia Monks (Macmillan)
- Gigantosaurus written by Jonny Duddle (Bonnier)
- Planet Omar: Operation Kind written by Zanib Mian (Hachette)
- Protect the Planet written by Jess French, illustrated by Aleesha Nandhra (DK)
- The River Whale written by Sita Brahmachari (Hachette)
- Skysteppers written by Katherine Rundell (Bloomsbury)
- Little Badman and the Radioactive Samosa written by Humza Arshad and Henry White, illustrated by Aleksei Bitskoff (Puffin Books)
- Football School written by Alexander Bellos and Ben Lyttleton, illustrated by Spike Gerrell (Walker Books)
- Kill Joy written by Holly Jackson (Egmont)
- Skulduggery Pleasant Apocalypse Kings written by Derek Landy (Harper Collins)

== 2022 ==
- Rocket Rules: Ten Little Ways to Think Big! written by Nathan Bryon, illustrated by Dapo Adeola (Puffin Books)
- Dinosaur Roar and Friends! written by Peter Curtis and Jeanne Willis (Macmillan Children's Books)
- Hey Duggee: The World Book Day Badge written by Studio AKA (Ladybird)
- Grimwood: Five Freakishly Funny Fables written by Nadia Shireen (Simon & Schuster)
- Jemima the Pig and the 127 Acorns written by Michael Morpurgo (HarperCollins Children's Books)
- My Very Very Very Very Very Very Very Silly Book of True or False written by Matt Lucas, illustrated by Sarah Horne (Farshore)
- The Worst Class in the World in Danger! written by Joanna Nadin, illustrated by Rikin Parekh (Bloomsbury)
- Hey Duggee: The World Book Day Badge written by Studio AKA (Ladybird)
- PEAK PERIL: A High-rise Mystery written by Sharna Jackson (Knights Of)
- The Wizard and Me: More Misadventures of Bubbles the Guinea Pig written by Simon Farnaby, illustrated by Claire Powell (Hachette Children's Group)
- Think Like a Boss: Discover the skills that turn great ideas into CASH written by Rashmi Sirdeshpande, illustrated by Adam Hayes (Hachette Children's Group)
- The Last Word written by Ben Bailey Smith (Bloomsbury)
- Boy, Missing written by Sophie McKenzie (Simon & Schuster)
- Deadly! Irish History: Fun with the Celts and the Vikings! written by John Farrelly (O'Brien Press) (only in Ireland)

== 2023 ==
- Lifesize Creepy Crawlies written by Sophy Henn (Red Shed, Farshore)
- Billy’s Bravery written by Tom Percival (Bloomsbury Children's Books)
- Bedtime for the Burpee Bears written by Joe Wicks, illustrated by Paul Howard (HarperCollins Children's Books)
- You Choose Your Adventure written by Pippa Goodhart, illustrated by Nick Sharratt (Puffin)
- Dave Pigeon: Bookshop Mayhem written by Swapna Haddow, illustrated by Sheena Dempsey (Faber)
- Marvel Spider-Man the Amazing Pocket Guide written by Catherine Saunders (DK)
- The Boy with Wings: Attack of the Rampaging Robot written by Lenny Henry, illustrated by Keenon Ferrell (Macmillan Children's Books)
- A Dragon Realm Adventure written by Katie Tsang and Kevin Tsang (Simon & Schuster Children's Books)
- The Strangeworlds Travel Agency: Adventure in the Floating Mountains written by L.D. Lapinski (Hachette Children's Group)
- Kay’s Brilliant Brains written by Adam Kay, illustrated by Henry Paker (Puffin)
- Boot It! written by A. M. Dassu, illustrated by Zainab Faidhi (Old Barn Books)
- Being an Ally: Real Talk About Showing Up, Screwing Up, and Trying Again written by Shakirah Bourne and Dana Alison Levy (DK)
- Hazel Tree Farm: One Stormy Night written by Alma Jordan, illustrated by Margaret Suggs (O'Brien Press) (only in Ireland)
- Rita agus an Dragún written by Máire Zepf, illustrated by Mr Ando (An tSnáthaid Mhór) (only in Ireland)
- Cyw written by Anni Llŷn (Y Lolfa) (only in Wales)

== 2024 ==
- Elmer and the Patchwork Story written by David McKee (Andersen Press)
- Greg the Sausage Roll: Lunchbox Superhero written by Mark Hoyle and Roxanne Hoyle (aka LadBaby), illustrated by Gareth Conway (Puffin)
- Charlie McGrew & The Horse That He Drew written by Rob Biddulph (HarperCollins Children's Books)
- Dinosaur Club: On the Trail of a T. rex written by Rex Stone (aka Jane Clarke), illustrated by Louise Forshaw (DK)
- InvestiGators: Hi-Rise Hijinks written by John Patrick Green, with Christopher Hastings and Pat Lewis (Macmillan Children's Books)
- Marv and the Ultimate Superpower written by Alex Falase-Koya, illustrated by Paula Bowles (Oxford University Press)
- Can You Get Jellyfish in Space? written by Dr Sheila Kanani, illustrated by Liz Kay (Puffin)
- Loki: Tales of a Bad God written by Louie Stowell (Walker Books)
- Onyeka and the Secret Superhero written by Tọlá Okogwu (Simon & Schuster Children's Books)
- The Amazing Edie Eckhart: The Friend Mission written by Rosie Jones, illustrated by Natalie Smillie (Hachette Children’s Group)
- Dread Wood: Creepy Creations written by Jennifer Killick (Farshore)
- The Doomsday Date written by Faridah Àbíké-Íyímídé, illustrated by Bex Glendining (Usborne)

== 2025 ==
- The Magic Balloon written by Carl Anka, illustrated by Amanda Quartey (DK)
- Bluey's Little Book (Ladybird)
- Who's in Acorn Wood written by Julia Donaldson, illustrated by Axel Scheffler (Macmillan)
- Barbara's Very Useful Guide to Moods written by Nadia Shireen (Puffin)
- Ag Buzzáil sa Ghairdín written by Áine Ní Ghlinn, illustrated by Andrew Whitson (An tSnáthaid Mhór)
- Fox & Son Tailers by Paddy Donnelly (O'Brien)
- The Adventures of Paddington: Farm Escape! (HarperCollins)
- Pokémon: The Epic Pocket Guide (Farshore)
- All Poems Aloud by Joseph Coelho, illustrated by Daniel Gray-Barnett (Quarto/Wide Eyed)
- Lego: Our Amazing Universe by Jennifer Swanson and Arwen Hubbard (DK)
- The Fart That Broke World Book Day written by Stephen Mangan, illustrated Anita Mangan (Scholastic)
- The Soccer Diaries: Rocky Takes the Lead written by Tom Palmer (Rebellion)
- The Wolf Trials: A Geomancer Book written by Kiran Millwood Hargrave, illustrated by Manuel Šumberac (Hachette)
- Gwyrdd ein Byd written by Duncan Brown, illustrated by Helen Flook (Rily)
- This Story is a Lie written by Benjamin Dean (Simon & Schuster)

== 2026 ==
=== Beginning ===
- Peppa Pig: One Big Family (Penguin Random House UK)
- Un i Ti ac Un i Fi written by Aneirin Karadog, illustrated by Matt Abbott (Gwasg Rily Publications) (only in Wales)
- The Big Bang written by Rose Ayling-Ellis in collaboration with Katie Blackburn, illustrated by Paddy Donnelly (DK)
- Rita agus an tEachtrán written by Máire Zepf, illustrated by Andrew Whitson (An tSnáthaid Mhór) (only in Ireland)

=== Early ===
- Unicorn Academy: My Secret Unicorn Diary (Nosy Crow)
- Funny FACTopia! written by Christopher Lloyd and Kate Olesin, illustrated by Andy Smith (What on Earth!)
- Pablo and Splash: The Castle Quest by Sheena Dempsey (Bloomsbury)
- Pia's Pet Club: Iguana Escape by Serena Patel, illustrated by Emma McCann (Usborne Publishing)

=== Fluent ===
- Bear Rescue written by Hannah Gold, illustrated by Levi Pinfold (HarperCollins Children’s Books)
- Bunny vs Monkey: Total Chaos! written by Jamie Smart (The Phoenix Comic Books)
- Skandar and the Secret Element written by A.F. Steadman (Simon & Schuster)
- Chaos at the Chocolate Factory written by Sibéal Pounder, illustrated by Emily Jones (Puffin)
- Unbelievable Football: The Most Amazing World Cup Stories You Never Knew written by Matt Oldfield, illustrated by Ollie Mann (Hachette Children’s Group)
- Milly McCarthy and the St Patrick's Day Pandemonium written by Leona Forde, illustrated by Karen Harte (Gill Books)
- The Doomsday Club: Shape-Shifters written by Kevin Moran (The O'Brien Press)

=== Independent ===
- Against All Odds written by Nathanael Lessore (Hot Key Books)

== 2027 ==
- This is My Music A World Book Day 2027 Mini Book written by Selina Brown, illustrated by Maxwell Afolabi Oginni (Penguin Random House UK)
- Norton Follow his Nose written by Ken Wilson-Max (Kumusha)
- Numberblocks: The Big Blocks Party (Every Cherry Publishing)
- Oíche Mhaith, a Ghrá written by Sadhbh Devlin, illustrated by Brian Fitzgerald (My Irish Books) (only in Ireland)
- Happy Times written by Emily Coxhead (Walker Books)
- The New Adventures of Disney Agent Stitch (DK)
- Kid Potato: Chip-tastic Tales written by Neil Coslett (Hachette Children’s Group)
- Grumpa agus na Nàbaidhean Ùra written by Ceitidh Hutton (Katie Hutton), illustrated by Sìne Annia NicGhillebhraithe (Dealan-Dè) (only in Scotland)
- Astrosaurs: Turbo Time Twist written by Steve Cole, illustrated by Alex Lopez (Bonnier Books UK)
- Guinness World Records: How to be a Record Breaker written by Craig Glenday (Guinness World Records)
- The Adventures of Rap Kid: Story Slam! written by MC Grammar (Jacob Mitchell), illustrated by Alan Brown (Simon & Schuster)
- Stori bob stafell written by Siôn Tomos Owen (Atebol) (only in Wales)
- Small Magics: Spellbound written by Alex Dunne (The O’Brien Press) (only in Ireland)
- Greenwild: The Castle Under the Mountain written by Pari Thomson, illustrated by Elisa Paganelli (Macmillan Children’s Books)
- The Misadventures of Mina Mahmood: Bake It Till You Make It! written by Farhana Islam, illustrated by Simran Diamond Singh (Farshore)
- Jamaal Target: Mission D.N.A. written by Isaac Hamilton-McKenzie, illustrated by Bea Jackson (Puffin)
- Artair sa Chaisteal written by Mòrag Anna NicNèill (Morag Ann MacNeil), illustrated by Britt Harcus (Acair) (only in Scotland)
- Cèic airson Màiri written by Uilleam Moireach (Will Murray), illustrated by Eilidh Muldoon (Acair) (only in Scotland)
