= H.I.V.E. (series) =

Young adult novel series by Mark Walden

- Higher Institute of Villainous Education; The Overlord Protocol; Escape Velocity; Interception Point (short special); Dreadnought; Rogue; Zero Hour; Aftershock; Deadlock; Bloodline
- Author: Mark Walden
- Country: United Kingdom
- Language: English
- Genre: Science fiction, action, adventure
- Publisher: Bloomsbury Publishing
- Published: 2006–2021
- Media type: Print (hardcover and paperback)
- No. of books: 9, plus a 60-page World Book Day special

H.I.V.E. (short for Higher Institute of Villainous Education) is a series of young adult novels by Mark Walden.

== Overview ==
H.I.V.E., the Higher Institute of Villainous Education, is a top-secret school inside an active volcano. The school, part of G.L.O.V.E. (the Global League of Villainous Enterprises), was built to train children to become criminal masterminds. Only children who have exhibited a villainous skill are accepted at the school, which has four streams: Alpha, Henchman, Technical, and Political/Financial. Each stream has a color, which is visible on the uniforms: Alpha is black, Henchman is blue, Technical is white, and Political/Financial is grey.

Otto Malpense is a thirteen-year-old criminal genius selected to join H.I.V.E. In the first book, Otto discovers that all is not as it seems and sets out to solve the mystery behind the school and its organization. Otto and his friends Wing, Shelby, and Laura try to defy headmaster Maximilian Nero and escape H.I.V.E. alive, an unprecedented feat.

== Books ==
1. Higher Institute of Villainous Education (2006)
2. The Overlord Protocol (2007)
3. Escape Velocity (2008)
4. Interception Point/Spook's Tale (2009 World Book Day special)
5. Dreadnought (2009)
6. Rogue (2010)
7. Zero Hour (2010)
8. Aftershock (2011)
9. Deadlock (2013)
10. Bloodline (2021)

== Reception ==
H.I.V.E. has received mostly-favorable reviews. Jack Heath, author of Money Run, said that "if you can suspend your disbelief far enough, you will find it a rewarding read ... The dialogue is witty, the plot twists deft, and the setting inventive, with plenty of knowing nods to the comic books and Bond films which pioneered the super villain tropes." The first book received a score of 4/5 on ABC, where it was described as having "adventure, sacrifice, mystery, surprises and evil doings."

== Plots ==
=== Higher Institute of Villainous Education ===
After realising that government funding which keeps the orphanage from closing is being cut, Otto Malpense creates a remotely-controlled device that can hack a teleprompter and cause it to hypnotize whoever looks into it. Malpense created the device to embarrass the Prime Minister during a speech. After achieving his objective, he is ambushed and stunned by Raven (an assassin who works for H.I.V.E) and awakens to find himself in a helicopter across from a stranger. The stranger is Wing Fanchu, and they quickly become friends. When the helicopter lands, Otto is informed that he will spend the next six years at H.I.V.E. Dr. Nero, H.I.V.E's headmaster, is interested to know that it took more than two shots from Sleepers (knock-out weapons designed to replace tranquilizer darts) to capture Wing – enough to send a normal boy into a weeks-long coma. He expresses his concerns to Raven and asks her to monitor Wing and Otto.

Otto's skills have identified him as an Alpha: a future leader. He has no intention of staying in this new prison, but becomes friends with others who have been brought to H.I.V.E., including Laura Brand, Shelby Trinity, Nigel Darkdoom, and Franz Argentblum. Otto teams up with Wing, Laura, and Shelby to hatch an escape plan. They travel through the hidden parts of the school, but as they nearly reach their freedom Dr. Nero reveals that they have been on an impossible mission. Nigel stirs up trouble when an enormous, flesh-eating plant (named Violet) he has accidentally bred escapes from the hydroponics lab. Everyone (including the students) jumps into action to successfully save the school, but Dr. Nero and many others are injured. Otto and Wing have a small window of opportunity to leave the school forever, but at the last second they decide to stay. Number One, Dr. Nero's boss and leader of G.L.O.V.E., has plans for Otto Malpense.

=== The Overlord Protocol ===
When Wing learns about his father's death, he selects Otto (supervised by Raven) to accompany him to the funeral. Before they can go, the trio is attacked by mysterious assassins. Wing appears to be shot by Cypher, a member of G.L.O.V.E. who wants to seize power and close H.I.V.E. Otto and Raven barely escape and hide in one of Raven's numerous safe houses, awaiting instructions from Dr. Nero. Raven tries to discover what Cypher is up to, with Otto at her side. They discover that the entities they battled at the original safe house are robots engineered for combat. Cypher attacks H.I.V.E., threatening to kill the students to get what he wants. Wing is found alive, shot by a tranquilizer disguised as a bullet, and joins his friends to save the school. They win the battle; Cypher is wounded, and Nero insists that he appear dead to everyone but himself and the doctor who treated him. Otto and his friends learn that Cypher is Wing's father, which explains his kidnapping of Wing. During Dr. Nero's interrogation, Cypher says that his motive for attacking the school was the Renaissance Initiative project. The initiative seeks to recreate Overlord, homicidal AI that wants to kill everything on the planet. Cypher believed that with the Overlord Protocol – a device allowing him to hack everything on the planet – and H.I.V.E. as hostage, he could attack the Renaissance Initiative (which is led by Number One). Otto and his friends are glad to be out of danger and home for good, excited that the H.I.V.E. mind's personality is restored.

=== Escape Velocity ===
Nero is kidnapped by H.O.P.E,, the Hostile Operative Prosecution Executive (a new anti-terrorist organisation), and the Contessa becomes headmistress of H.I.V.E. with an elite guard known as the Phalanx. Otto, Wing, Laura, Shelby and Raven escape from the school after being extracted by Raven, and join forces with Diabolus Darkdoom, Nigel's supposedly-traitorous, dead father, who takes charge from a massive submarine known as the Megalodon. Overlord, inside Number One's body, is behind the plot. Otto is Number One's clone, designed as a host body for Overlord. They assault H.O.P.E to rescue Nero, but are captured and sent into space to Number One's hideout. Otto narrowly escapes being taken over by Number One/Overlord, and must delete H.I.V.E.mind. H.I.V.E. is under attack by executioners known as the Reapers, the teachers are shut out of H.I.V.E.'s systems, and the Contessa sacrifices herself to save the school by igniting a pool of jet fuel.

=== Dreadnought ===
The arrival of new student Lucy Dexter confuses the students, but they quickly befriend her. On their way to a training mission, they visit the Dreadnought (a new mobile command center for G.L.O.V.E.) The mission is cancelled when the Dreadnought is attacked by a rogue G.L.O.V.E. member. Nero, Raven and the students narrowly escape, but Diabolus Darkdoom is left behind and enemy agents are sent after them. They discover that Lucy is actually the Contessa's granddaughter and can control people with her voice. They try to rescue Diabolus and foil a plan to use American weaponry, controlled by Air Force One, to erupt a supervolcano and destroy civilization. They rescue Diabolus, but Otto must stay behind on the out-of-control Air Force One to disarm the weapon. He passes out after the plane crashes, leaving him in the custody of the U.S. government. Trent talks to the president, and injects Otto with Animus Fluid.

=== Rogue ===
Otto has been infected by Animus, an organic supercomputer which can be programmed by H.O.P.E. to make him do their bidding. With Ghost, a superhuman assassin, he attacks members of G.L.O.V.E. Raven is on a mission to find Sebastian Trent, first going to a facility where there might be information. She threatens Khan, who begins to unlock his computer. As he is entering his password, he is killed by a remotely-controlled microexplosive device in his skull. She takes his laptop, and Nero picks her up for the G.L.O.V.E. council meeting. At the meeting of the remaining G.L.O.V.E. members, who are waiting for Darkdoom to fail, Darkdoom is pressured to make a decision and issues a capture-or-kill order for Otto. During a private meeting with Nero, Raven sees a sniper (Ghost) and barely saves Darkdoom from assassination. While Darkdoom is in the H.I.V.E. medical center, Professor Pike and Laura Brand try to fix the school's technical problems. Raven hacks Khan's laptop with Professor Pike's help, and finds a picture of a seed. After consulting the biotechnology teacher, she learns that the seed is most commonly found in the Amazon. Wing (who wants to find Otto) stows away with her on the Shroud, but they are captured by H.O.P.E. Amidst chaos at H.I.V.E., Nero brings in another expert on artificial intelligence (the newly-freed Cypher) to help investigate. They believe it is Overlord, but it is H.I.V.E.mind rebuilding himself. Organic supercomputers repair themselves as seed programs and, when they reach the self-awareness stage, they can exert control. Raven's original purpose for going to the Amazon was to seek help from an old friend, who betrays her. Carlos Chavez, the ruler of Brazil, had pinpointed Raven's arrival. Chavez had enlisted a commander, Rafael, but Raven and Wing defeat Rafael's men and Raven cuts Rafael's throat. After the mission's failure, Chavez (defying Nero's wishes) posts a priority-one notice on GLOVE.net for Operation Raven: to kill Raven. Lin Feng had supported Chavez's assassination attempt on Raven to prevent Nero from gaining power because Lin Feng knew that Chavez was too unruly to control the council, and Lin Feng would eventually take over G.L.O.V.E.

Cypher takes advantage of his freedom to look for Wing at H.O.P.E.'s base, accompanied by Laura, Shelby, and Lucy as hostages he took when he escaped. The girls escape from him and free Raven; when Otto begins to resist Animus (when he was told to kill Wing), Wing escapes to join them. Otto distracts Ghost; Raven beheads Ghost, but Cypher finds the group and tries to kill Otto to protect the world from Overlord. Cypher is shot dead by Wing and Otto is nearly taken over by Overlord, but Laura uses the neural pulse device to eject Overlord and Animus from his system (nearly killing Otto). Sebastian Trent attacks them, but is taken over by Animus and killed by Raven. The students return to H.I.V.E., where Otto recovers and tells Nero that Animus tried to destroy organic material; with the Overlord (not H.I.V.E.mind, as Otto had hoped) seed growing in him, they fused to become extremely powerful. Every time Otto tried to hold them back, he weakened.

Because Darkdoom believes that his old idea of ruling with respect was not good enough and his injuries need more time to recover, he suggested that Nero take over G.L.O.V.E. and add the fear that Number One had. During their virtual meeting, with only nine members (including Nero) remaining, G.L.O.V.E. was in peril. Nero proposes himself as the leader, but Lin Feng opposes him. With no other ally (because Raven killed Chavez), Lin Feng angrily leaves the council. He is part of The Disciples, and talks to Pietor Furan about what happened. Furan orders Lin Feng to apologize to Nero and regain his seat in G.L.O.V.E. Furan then tells Dr. Creed (whom he saved from the rainforest) to perform an autopsy on Trent, who has been dead for two weeks. It is believed that the Animus would be inert, but it emerges and consumes Dr. Creed; the Overlord-Animus combination survives in the doctor.

=== Zero Hour ===
Overlord has developed the power to move from body to body if the host has been exposed to Animus. Lucy and Otto share a moment, which makes Shelby laugh and Laura jealous. New machines have been developed, and their first exposure to the public evokes terror as Overlord takes control of the facility (an Advanced Weapons facility in Colorado). Raven is exposed to Animus, and is controlled by Overlord. When Raven, Furan and a team try to capture Otto and his friends, they board Darkdoom's Megalodon ship. H.I.V.Emind is transferred to Otto's mind, since Raven shut off H.I.V.Emind from the rest of the school.

They are attacked by the U.S., which is trying to also capture Otto because Overlord is holding several strategic hostages. Nero, Otto, Wing, Laura, Lucy, Shelby and Laura go into the GCHQ (Echelon) to transmit a signal which activates Zero Hour. Otto secretly installs a destroy code for Echelon, which they accessed through the prime minister (one of Nero's former students). The prime minister (a Disciple) betrays them at the last minute, telling Overlord where Otto is. Raven takes Otto, Lucy and Laura aboard and brings them to AWP, where Overlord is.

Overlord plans to take over the world with self-replicating nanites mixed with animus which, if released, will enslave everyone. The battle is almost over and the Disciples, followers of Overlord, are winning. Nero and Darkdoom must activate Zero Hour, their final effort, in a fight to the death. Zero Hour involves all of the most successful ex-Alphas, outfitted with new machinery and gadgets. They fight, and Lucy sacrifices herself for Otto. Overlord releases the nanites; Otto uses four nuclear missiles to obliterate the facility and destroy the nanites, permanently closing Echelon in memory of Lucy.

The heroes survive; although Overlord is gone, the Disciples remain. Nero disbands the ruling council of G.L.O.V.E, telling them that they are part of a bygone era. This angers them, and some join the Disciples.

=== Aftershock ===
The former members of the G.L.O.V.E. council, angry at Nero's decision to replace them, join the Disciples in the Hunt (a plot to sabotage the H.I.V.E. training program). Nero does not know this, and has underestimated his opponents' cunning and resources. Chief Dekker, H.I.V.E.'s new chief of security, is a member of the Disciples who revealed to be the one that threatened Laura to have her family killed if she does not help him. Otto and Laura had a plan together to steal the exam questions for their finals in their year. Together along with their friends and two new friends: Penny and Tom (Otto's friends back from St. Sebastian) that joined H.I.V.E mid-year.

After their plan had been successful (by the skin of their teeth; had a little slip-up, but overall went well), and all of Otto's friends went back to their dormitory except Otto and Laura. Unfortunately, Cole Harrington, along with Block and Tackle, had surrounded them and Cole demanded to give the exam questions. Including the other thing(s) that Otto and Laura taken: the location of The Hunt (Siberia). Otto decided to give everything that they had taken from his plan from his Blackbox to Cole's. Unfortunately, Cole had decided to get Block and Tackle to kill both of them but got saved when the alarms rang when H.I.V.E.mind spotted that there is something missing that he was protecting. Dr. Nero, Chief Dekker, and Raven arrived to the situation. When H.I.V.E.mind scanned Otto and Cole's Blackboxes, Otto last minute used his ability to make it look like Cole was the one that stole the exam questions and the other things, the Hunt and some of H.I.V.E.mind's code. Cole went to the Detention and Otto and Laura went back to their dormitory.

When the Alphas set out for the Hunt, the Disciples are waiting for them. They were the ones that sabotaged the entire Hunt and ended up kidnapping an entire generation of Alphas and (accidentally) killed a few. Otto and his friends all survived the attacked and ran away for a dozen hours before being spotted by Raven at night and eventually get away from the Disciples. Raven, Otto, Wing, Laura, Shelby, Nigel, Franz, Penny, and Tom found an old, secret Russian base (TBA) that the interior is a big replica of the old American setting.

Anastasia Furan is the new leader for the Disciples and a ghostly character for Raven's past. She is also a leader of the Glasshouse. The Disciples made their way into the building after they tracked down the location of Raven and the students. After a fight inside the replica between the Disciples and the students, Furan won the battle and revealed herself to the students, and Raven. She took Laura, Nigel, Penny, and Tom to the Glasshouse.

Otto, Wing, Shelby, and Franz was saved and return to H.I.V.E., but Otto is expelled for telling the truth and reveal his role in stealing the Hunt's location. Dr. Nero makes an agreement with Otto: if he, Raven and H.I.V.E.mind can track down the Disciples, he will be allowed to return to H.I.V.E. Raven and Otto travel throughout Europe to assassinate the Disciples.

=== Deadlock ===
Otto and Raven are desperate to rescue their friends from Disciples leader Anastasia Furan. They must find the Glasshouse, the prison where Furan trains children to become assassins. Otto is also being hunted, and the three months Otto has spent away from H.I.V.E. have given the Artemis Section (an elite American intelligence division which reports only to the president) an opportunity to locate him. Tom dies after an escape attempt from the Glasshouse, but they send their whereabouts to H.I.V.E. Anastasia has spent years trying to create Zero, a clone which looks like Otto, that Otto kills with the help of H.I.V.E.mind. The Glasshouse is destroyed, and Nero locks Anastasia under H.I.V.E. Otto and Laura kiss. Zero had hinted at more clones, and about a dozen cloning vats (each with a clone of Otto) are counting down.

=== Bloodline ===
A99A, a clone of Otto, controls Dr. Higgs. The clone renames herself Anna, and intimidates the research team into continuing making her clones. Anna forces Joseph Wright, a Disciple, to locate Anastasia. At H.I.V.E., Professor Pike accuses Otto of attacking H.I.V.E mind; in the control room, they find that Anna is the attacker. H.I.V.E mind fails, and Anna controls the school. She can control a person with her voice (characteristic of the Sinistre family) and shares Otto's ability to interface electronics. Nero, Otto and his friends barely escape with the help of Darkdoom and his new submarine, also named Megalodon. Nero, Darkdoom and Otto visit the Queen, the last survivor of the Sinistre family. One of the security teams works for the Disciples, who send a squad. The Artemis Section also finds Otto, and sends fighter jets and a team of Navy SEALs.

Nero suspects that the Queen is involved with this; Anna's voice is exactly like hers. She denies any involvement, and is angry to learn that the Furans have used her voice. The Disciples and Navy SEALs team converge and invade the house, and the Queen is forced to lead them to a secret passageway leading to the roof. Otto and Nero escape in a helicopter which crashes; Nero is captured by the Disciples, and Otto by the Artemis Section. Darkdoom and the Queen escape in a Shroud, a stealth helicopter from the Megalodon. Nero is held at H.I.V.E. and tortured by Anastasia and Raven. Otto is questioned by the president, who initially thinks he is responsible for Anna's hacking of the global surveillance programs (which causes a Russian ship to disappear). The president shows Otto that they have a bit of Animus, which Otto thought had been destroyed in Zero Hour. Darkdoom and Otto meet and develop a plan to defeat Anna. The plan (a trap) goes horribly wrong; Darkdoom's men are killed, and Otto is captured. At H.I.V.E, Wing, Mrs. Leon and Penny evacuate the school by launching the students into the volcano and the volcano into the ocean and the surrounding area. During the widespread disruption, the robots which survived Cypher's attack and were being used by Anna are short-circuited.

Otto confronts Anna, pulls out the Animus, injects himself, and traps her. Anastasia forces Raven to torture Nero, and kills the Queen. After the Queen dies Nero finds out Raven is his daughter and, when Anna is killed, has Raven kill Anastasia. Otto kills Anna's clones by purging their tanks and Nero, Otto's friends and the teachers board a Shroud and await him. It suddenly takes off, and Otto says that the Animus is killing him. He apologizes for betraying them and thanks H.I.V.E mind. H.I.V.E mind kills him, and transfers him to one of Anna's clones; in a year, he will be reborn. The volcano explodes as H.I.V.E mind detonates a small nuclear bomb at its base. Otto's friends mourn him, and it is unknown if H.I.V.E mind survives. At the end of the book a reborn Otto appears on Laura's doorstep.

== Characters ==
=== Students ===
- Otto Malpense – The main character of the series, a white-haired English boy who was raised in an orphanage. At H.I.V.E., he has the ability to interface telepathically with computer networks due to a supercomputer implanted in his brain by Overlord to make him a perfect replacement body. Although this ability is useful to search for information, it leaves him vulnerable to possession by Overlord and other artificial intelligences such as Animus. In Aftershock, Otto is expelled from H.I.V.E. because he was unknowingly part of a plan which led to the murder of fifteen Alpha students and the kidnapping of the rest of them.
- Wing Fanchu – A tall Asian boy who is Otto's best friend. His parents, Wu Zhang and Xiu Mei Chen, were G.L.O.V.E. operatives in hiding after the failure of the Overlord project. After his mother's death, he enrolls at H.I.V.E. at his father's request. Loyal to and protective of his friends, he is often teased for his humourlessness. Wing refuses to kill his enemies because he promised his mother he would never take a life. He had a difficult relationship with his father (who became the villain Cypher in The Overlord Protocol), and believes him dead more than once. In The Overlord Protocol, Cypher falls from a high walkway and Wing thinks he killed him. His father reappears in Rogue, and an angry Wing kills him after he tries to kill Otto.
- Laura Brand – A Scottish girl who is an expert computer hacker. She was sent to H.I.V.E. after hacking into a military airbase to spy on a school friend's conversations. Laura is close friends with her roommate Shelby, and enjoys discussing computers with Otto (to whom she is romantically attracted). In Aftershock, she is forced by Chief Dekker (a member of the Disciples) to find the location of the Hunt. Fifteen Alpha students are killed, and the rest (except Otto, Wing, Shelby and Franz) are kidnapped. Laura joins the kidnapped Alpha students in the Glasshouse.
- Shelby Trinity – A wealthy American girl who joined H.I.V.E. after becoming a jewel thief known as the Wraith. Good at martial arts, her main area of expertise is stealth and lock-picking. Shelby is the most talkative and adventurous of the group, and begins a romance with Wing in Zero Hour. She is sarcastic, and tries to make light of whatever situation in which the group find themselves. Her greatest fear is being locked up.
- Nigel Darkdoom – Son of Diabolus Darkdoom who is reluctant to follow in his father's footsteps, since he believes he is dead until the events of Escape Velocity. He excels at hydroponics, and inadvertently creates a monster plant (Violet) which attacks the school. Sometimes considered weak, he insists on helping the others in times of danger. He is best friends with Franz, and they are often bullied by Block and Tackle.
- Franz Argentblum – Son of a German chocolate magnate and villain. English is not his first language, and his grammar is often odd. Overweight, he constantly thinks about food. Franz is close friends with Nigel. He reminds his friends of his heroics in saving the school in The Overlord Protocol, where he apprehends Colonel Francisco before a bomb attached to the energy generator blows up. In Aftershock, he unintentionally surprised his friends and Raven for successfully shooting down a helicopter in a distance that wasn't in a good range for his friend, Nigel, getting shot by it. That led for the following books of him being a great sniper.
- Tom Ransom – Arriving at the beginning of Aftershock, he is a fellow orphan at Otto's orphanage. After Otto leaves the orphanage, he and his friend Penny begin a wealth-redistribution program (nicknamed the Hoods, after Robin Hood) until they come to H.I.V.E. and joined the Alpha stream. He and Penny are captured by the Disciples and brought to the Glasshouse. To create a diversion so Laura can send a distress signal, Tom gets into a fight with Nigel and Anastasia kills him.
- Penny Richards – Tom's death turns her against Otto and his friends.
- Viscontessa Lucia Sinestre, a.k.a. Lucy Dexter – Arrives at the beginning of Dreadnought and placed in the Alpha stream. Lucy quickly befriends the group, particularly Laura and Shelby, but initially sceptical about their tales of past adventures. The Contessa's granddaughter, she shares the ability to control others with her voice but can only control a few people at once. In Zero Hour, she begins a romantic relationship with Otto. Lucy is shot by Furan (controlled by Overlord) and presumably eaten by the Animus nanites with Furan and Overlord. Otto refuses to leave her to die, but she uses her voice to force him to save himself.
- Block and Tackle - Two students from the Henchman stream who bully the Alphas, particularly Otto and Wing
- Cole Harrington – A fifth-year Politics and Finance-stream student who tries to seize H.I.V.E.mind's source code from Otto (minutes after Otto steals it himself) to sell on the black market. Otto frames Harrington for stealing the code, and he is locked in the H.I.V.E. brig. He is killed by Chief Dekker (working for the Disciples), who tries to make his death look like a suicide.

=== Staff ===
- Maximilian Nero - Headmaster of H.I.V.E., who became leader of G.L.O.V.E. at the end of Rogue. He is a careful villain and, despite his reputation for heartlessness, cares about H.I.V.E. and its students. Nero treats Raven as a friend, and is protective of her. He has run H.I.V.E. since the 1960s, although he only appears to be in his 30s. Nero was involved in the Overlord project, and was nearly killed.
- Contessa Maria Sinistre - Originally one of Nero's most-trusted teachers, she is bribed by Cypher to help him in The Overlord Protocol. She can make anybody do what she wants, although the strong-willed can resist her. In Escape Velocity, she becomes headmistress of H.I.V.E. after Nero's kidnapping and was involved in a plan to attack the school; she changes sides, sacrifices herself to save the students, and is remembered as a hero. She has a daughter (who died) and a granddaughter, Lucy Dexter.
- Natalya/Raven, used as a code name, is H.I.V.E.'s most-feared assassin. She is trained by the Furans during her childhood at their castle, the Glasshouse. After seeing her best friend, Dimitri, killed by Anastasia Furan and after being forced by the Furans to kill her other friend Tolya, Raven swears to kill them. She has a long, curved scar running down one cheek, a pale face, and cold blue eyes. Her main weapons are a pair of katanas, replacements created by Professor Pike in The Overlord Protocol.
- Colonel Francisco – The head of tactical education at H.I.V.E., considered one of the school's toughest teachers by its students. He has an artificial metal hand.
- Professor William Pike – Head of the technology department and a creator of H.I.V.E.mind. Apparently disorganized and distracted, he has a brilliant, shrewd, cunning mind.
- Tabitha Leon – The head of stealth and evasion, whose consciousness is transferred to her pet cat after a failed experiment by Professor Pike. Although she dislikes being a cat, she finds enhanced hearing and claws useful.
- Ms. Gonzales – The head of the biotechnology department, who is an expert on plants. Genetic manipulation of plant life to produce dangerous and deadly results is her specialty.
- H.I.V.E.mind - The school's AI, created by Professor Pike. In the battle with Overlord in Escape Velocity, H.I.V.E.mind sacrifices its life to destroy Overlord by telling Otto to delete Overlord and himself from his mind. H.I.V.E.mind regenerates in Rogue; in Zero Hour, it is downloaded to the device in Otto's head and helps to destroy Overlord. Although it must leave Otto's head at the end of Zero Hour, it was readmitted at the end of Aftershock to help him track down the Disciples.
- Chief Lewis – The former head of H.I.V.E.’s security teams, who plays a secondary role; in Dreadnought, the head of security is Chief Monroe. Trustworthy, he is competent or lucky. His luck runs out in Zero Hour, when he is killed by Raven while she is infected with Animus and controlled by Overlord and the Disciples.
- Chief Dekker – The new head of security in Aftershock, after Chief Lewis’ death in Zero Hour. A member of the Disciples, she forces Laura to find out the location of the Hunt in Aftershock. Nero and Raven learn that Dekker is a Disciple, and she is tortured until she tells Raven where Laura's parents are.
- Mrs. McTavish – H.I.V.E.'s librarian, mentioned in Escape Velocity when she pulls Otto out of his virtual world and back into the real one.
- Ms. Tennenbaum – The German head of the finance and corruption department, who is usually one of the school's most emotionless teachers.
- Mr. Rictor – The teacher of logistics and operations. Otto does considers him a boring speaker, but his information is fascinating.
- Dr. Scott – H.I.V.E.’s chief medical officer, the only person (until Rogue) other than Nero who knew that Cypher survives his attempt to destroy H.I.V.E. in The Overlord Protocol. Scott helps cure Diabolus Darkdoom when he is shot in Rogue, and Nero when he is stabbed in Zero Hour.

=== G.L.O.V.E. members ===
- Number One – The former commander of the G.L.O.V.E., controlled by Overlord since his attempt to destroy H.I.V.E.mind. He is killed in Escape Velocity, but Overlord survives. Otto, Number One's clone, looks like a young Number One.
- The Reapers – Number One's executioners, a death squad which leaves no one alive
- The Phalanx – An elite team which protects Number One. A small Phalanx group comes to H.I.V.E. in Escape Velocity to protect the Contessa when she becomes headmistress.
- Diabolus Darkdoom - The leader of G.L.O.V.E. in Dreadnought and Rogue. Number One believes he knows too much about the Renaissance Initiative, and has him framed for treason. Diabolus fakes his death and lives on his submarine, Megalodon, for several years. In Escape Velocity, he helps Otto rescue Nero in the Swiss Alps and destroy Overlord in Zero Hour. His son, Nigel Darkdoom, is a student at H.I.V.E.
- Cypher (Mao Fanchu/Wu Zhang) - The insane co-creator of Overlord, Cypher plans a failed revolt against Number One in The Overlord Protocol. He is hidden in the H.I.V.E. vaults until Rogue, when he tricks Nero and Professor Pike and escapes. Cypher is shot by his son, Wing, in Rogue after trying to kill Otto and destroy Overlord.
- Xiu Mei Chen – The creator of Overlord. Thought killed by her creation, she begins a new life in Japan as Wing's mother but learns about the Overlord Protocol codes. Xiu Mei Chen hides the codes in twin ying-yang amulets, gives one amulet to Wing and sends the other to Nero. Number One learns that she knows about the protocol, and orders her killed.
- Joseph Wright – Former head of G.L.O.V.E.'s British operations. After Nero replaces the G.L.O.V.E. ruling council at the end of Zero Hour, he unsuccessfully tries to kill him at the beginning of Aftershock. Wright is contracted by the Disciples and joins them in a plan to destroy G.L.O.V.E.
- Wade Jackson – Former head of G.L.O.V.E.'s North American operations, who was dismissed from the ruling council at the end of Zero Hour. Joins the Disciples at the beginning of Aftershock.
- Luca Venturi – Former head of G.L.O.V.E.'s Southern European operations, who joins the Disciples at the beginning of Aftershock.
- Felicia Diaz – Former head of G.L.O.V.E.'s South American operations, who joins in Zero Hour as the successor of Carlos Chavez. Joins the Disciples at the beginning of Aftershock.
- Baron Von Sturm – Former G.L.O.V.E. member who joins the Disciples at the beginning of Aftershock.
- Lin Feng – Former head of G.L.O.V.E.'s Chinese operations who works for the Disciples. At the end of Rogue, he tries to leave because he is angry at Nero's decision to become the head of G.L.O.V.E.; the Disciples force him to beg Nero to reinstate him. In Zero Hour, Feng is betrayed by the Disciples and killed by Raven while she is infected with Animus and controlled by them.
- Carlos Chavez – Former chief of G.L.O.V.E.'s South American operations, whose career began in the Rio de Janeiro slums. In Rogue, he tries to kill Raven because he is angry at Diabolus Darkdoom for becoming head of G.L.O.V.E. (instead of himself). Raven learns that Chavez tried to kill her, and kills him.
- The Lobos – Carlos Chavez's team of soldiers and assassins who trained under Chavez's office building in Rio. Most are killed in Rogue when they attack Raven on Corcovado.
- Rafael – Carlos Chavez's most-trusted lieutenant and a member of the Lobos. Sent by Chavez to eliminate Raven in Rogue, his mission fails and Raven cuts his throat.
- Madam Mortis – A former member of G.L.O.V.E. who is killed by Otto at the beginning of Rogue when he is infected by Animus and under H.O.P.E.'s control. In The Overlord Protocol, she suggests using computer-controlled sharks to kill G.L.O.V.E.'s enemies.
- Jonas Steiner – A former G.L.O.V.E. member who is killed at the beginning of Rogue when Otto (injected with Animus and controlled by H.O.P.E.) sabotages his private jet's navigation system and autopilot and it crashes in the Bavarian Alps.
- Gregori Leonov – A Russian man who is one of the longest-surviving members of G.L.O.V.E. and a good friend of Nero. The Reapers kill his family in Escape Velocity when he discovers the Renaissance Initiative; when Leonov tries to warn Nero, he is killed by a H.O.P.E. assassin.
- Yuri Leonov – Gregori Leonov's son, who attended H.I.V.E. and works for his father in The Overlord Protocol. He is killed by the Reapers in Escape Velocity with the rest of his family.
- Agent One – A Japanese bodyguard who helps Raven protect Wing and Otto in Tokyo in The Overlord Protocol. He is killed when Cypher's robots attack his safe house.
- Agent Zero – An American bodyguard who helps Raven protect Wing and Otto in Tokyo in The Overlord Protocol and is killed by Cypher.
- Jason Drake – An American former G.L.O.V.E. member and owner of the multi-national Drake Industries, which developed much of G.L.O.V.E.'s advanced technology. He goes rogue in Dreadnought and begins working for the Disciples, believing that Number One's death is a coup by Nero and Diabolus Darkdoom to seize control of G.L.O.V.E. He is further angered when his greatest project (the Dreadnought) is taken by Darkdoom as his flagship, because he hopes to curry favor with Number One by giving it to him. Drake is killed by Pietor Furan when he says that the Disciples no longer need him. He also designs the Shroud dropships and the larger Leviathan ships.

=== The Disciples ===
- Pietor Furan - An assassin who used to work for the Spetsnaz, Russia's elite special forces unit, and was recruited by the Disciples. He and his sister, Anastasia, created the Glasshouse: a castle in the Russian wilderness where they cruelly trained children to be assassins. The Furans trained Raven there; Raven swore that she would kill them after Anastasia shot her best friend, Dimitri, and forced her to kill her other friend Tolya. Pietor's right eye was blinded by Raven when she was 11 years old. He first appears in Dreadnought and seems to be working for Jason Drake, but the Disciples order him to infect the Dreadnought with Animus, kill Jason and escape. In Zero Hour, Pietor is killed when Raven stabs him with a katana. Overlord takes over his body seconds after his death, using his as a host before he is eaten alive by Animus nanites.
- Anastasia Furan/Minerva - The leader of the Disciples in Aftershock, who helped train Raven with her brother Pietor. Anastasia sends Raven to kill Nero, but she is captured and brought to the temporary H.I.V.E. when the new facility is under construction. Nero convinces Raven not to listen to Anastasia. A few months later, Nero, Diabolus Darkdoom and Raven attack the Glasshouse; when Anastasia is about to escape in a helicopter, Raven shoots the helicopter down and thinks Anastasia is dead. Pietor finds Anastasia alive but disfigured, and she gets revenge on Raven in Aftershock by finding out the location of the Hunt, murdering fifteen Alpha students and kidnapping the rest of them (except for Otto, Wing, Shelby and Franz).
- Duncan Cavendish/Disciple 9 – The British prime minister in Zero Hour. Nero requests access to GCHQ for Otto, Wing, Shelby, and Laura to allow H.I.V.E.mind to transmit the Zero Hour code. Cavendish works for the Disciples and, after granting them access, gives Pietor the students' location.

=== H.O.P.E. characters ===
- Sebastian Trent - The former leader of H.O.P.E. who tells the world that he is trying to stop terrorism, but helps Overlord and the Disciples. He is killed in Rogue by Animus with a tiny part of Overlord; although Overlord should have been destroyed, it survives with Trent's body as a host.
- Dr. Creed – The scientist who injects Animus into Otto's body so H.O.P.E. can control him. He is killed at the end of Rogue when he is infected by Animus with a tiny part of Overlord, making him the host for Overlord's rebirth.
- Verity/Ghost – Originally one of the identical-twin assassins (the other is Constance) who work for H.O.P.E. in Escape Velocity. When Constance is killed by Raven in Escape Velocity by falling from a cable car on Raven's katana, Verity is captured and freed by a H.O.P.E. member. She unsuccessfully tries to avenge her sister by killing Raven. She is brought back as a cyborg and code-named Ghost; the scientists at H.O.P.E. fuse her flesh with cybernetic implants and make her armor that cannot be penetrated by Raven's katanas. Verity is beheaded by Raven in Rogue.
- Constance – One of the twin assassins who work for H.O.P.E. in Escape Velocity, she dies when Raven pushes her into a katana held by Verity.

=== Other characters ===
- Overlord – A murderous artificial intelligence who wants to take over the world. Created by Xiu Mei Chen in the Chinese mountains twenty years earlier, it is nearly destroyed by Number One before using Number One as a host. Otto apparently destroys Overlord when he tries to take over Otto's mind in Escape Velocity, but a tiny part is rebuilt inside Otto's head in Rogue. Laura shoots Otto with a neural-pulse device built by Cypher and Professor Pike; Overlord is forced out of Otto's head, but because Overlord has fused with the Animus inside Otto, it can move from body to body. Overlord is finally destroyed for good when Otto leaves it to be eaten by Animus nanites in Zero Hour.
- The Architect/Nathaniel – Designed buildings for a number of organizations (and, accidentally, the next Glasshouse), and revealed as Nero's father in Deadlock.
- Nazim Khan – An Arabic man who designed H.O.P.E.'s camouflaged facility in the Amazon rain forest in Rogue. Although the Disciples and H.O.P.E. promise to protect him, they betray him in Rogue and he is attacked by Raven. Khan tries to give Raven the details of Trent's facility, but is killed by a micro-explosive device implanted in his skull that was triggered remotely by H.O.P.E.
- Dimitri – Young Raven's best friend at the Glasshouse. During a failed escape attempt, Dimitri is killed by Anastasia Furan after he tries to get survival suits for Raven, Tolya and himself. Raven describes him as the only person the Furans do not break in spirit, and who helped others remain strong as well.
- Tolya – Young Raven's friend at the Glasshouse. He and Raven watch Anastasia kill Dimitri, their best friend. The Furans lock Tolya and Raven up for weeks; Tolya becomes insane, and Raven is forced to kill him. He regains his senses as he dies, which leaves Raven guilty.
- Mary, Andrew, and Douglas Brand – Laura's parents and baby brother, who are kidnapped by the Disciples in Aftershock and used to threaten Laura into finding the location of the Hunt. Although Laura gives the location of the Hunt to the Disciples, the Brands are going to be killed by them anyway before they are rescued by Raven.
- Mrs. McReedy – The head of Otto's orphanage (St Sebastian's) before he comes to H.I.V.E.
- Captain Sanders – Captain of the Megalodon (Diabolus Darkdoom's submarine) in Escape Velocity and Zero Hour.
- Dr. Charles Morley – Leader of the group of scientists who clone Number One to create baby Otto. When they finish the job, Morley and his team are killed by explosive devices hidden throughout the facility by Number One so they cannot reveal what they are doing.
- Elena Furan – Anastasia and Pietor Furan's sister. In Aftershock, Anastasia tells Raven to kill Nero because he killed someone she had loved; Nero wants Anastasia dead because she killed someone he had loved. That someone is Elena, whom Pietor accidentally kills.

== Organizations and facilities ==
- H.I.V.E. – The Higher Institute of Villainous Education, a school for children skilled at evil.
- G.L.O.V.E. – The Global League of Villainous Enterprises, originally run by Number One. Diabolus Darkdoom becomes its leader at the end of Escape Velocity, and Nero succeeds him at the end of Rogue. Its symbol is a fist hammering a splintering globe. At the end of Zero Hour, Nero replaces the G.L.O.V.E. ruling council and the former council members join the Disciples.
- The Disciples – Overlord's most trusted followers and supporters, who will do anything to destroy G.L.O.V.E. and continue Overlord's work.
- H.O.P.E. – The Hostile Operative Prosecution Executive, which claims to be an anti-terrorist organization but actually helps the Disciples. Its symbol is an angel flying upwards with a sword held aloft in its outstretched hands.
- The Glasshouse – Pietor and Anastasia Furan's castle in which they cruelly train children to become assassins. Located in the Russian wilderness, Raven was trained there and the kidnapped Alpha-stream students at H.I.V.E. were brought there at the end of Aftershock.
- Advanced Weapons Project (AWP) facility – A secret base in Colorado where the Goliath battle robots are created in Zero Hour. During the demonstration of the Goliaths, Overlord and the Disciples captured the government workers who were there for the demonstration. AWP became Overlord's base, and it was the site of the final battle between Overlord's forces and the Zero Hour team of former H.I.V.E. pupils. It is destroyed by a nuclear missile at the end of Zero Hour to destroy the Animus nanites that Overlord had released.
- The Vault – AWP's most secure place, where Overlord and Pietor Furan retreat in Zero Hour with Laura and Lucy as hostages when they realise that Nero's Zero Hour team of former H.I.V.E. pupils are inside the AWP facility. Raven and Otto get into the Vault, which leads to the deaths of Overlord, Furan and Lucy; Raven, Otto and Laura escape.
- Government Communication Headquarters (GCHQ) - The hub of Britain's intelligence communications network in Cheltenham. In Zero Hour, Nero convinces the prime minister (a former H.I.V.E. pupil) to give Otto and the other Alphas unrestricted access to GCHQ so they can use the equipment there to activate Nero's Zero Hour plan to stop Overlord. Although the team of Alphas activates Zero Hour, the prime minister betrays them and Otto, Laura and Lucy are captured by the Disciples.
- Echelon – The area in GCHQ in which every phone call, internet search and radio transmission is searched by intelligent algorithms for hints of terrorist activity. In Zero Hour, Otto and the other Alphas go to Echelon to activate Nero's Zero Hour plan. At the end of Zero Hour, Otto activates a code shutting down Echelon in memory of Lucy.

== Machines and devices ==
- Blackbox - A student device at H.I.V.E that is a carry-on-at-all-times item for students to track their location. Other than that, it is a tool to be a useful device to talk to H.I.V.E.mind and usual commands for other convenient things (ex. Finding your dorm, other questions for H.I.V.E, et cetera). Controlled with H.I.V.E.mind.
- Animus – Self-replicating, organic supercomputers which control people and look like black slime. Animus, created by Overlord, can control any system in which it is inserted. In and before Rogue, anyone except Otto who is injected with Animus dies because its complexity makes it lethal to most humans. In Zero Hour, Overlord develops an Animus that was simpler and non-lethal, but unable to contain Overlord. Later in Zero Hour, Otto, Professor Pike and H.I.V.E.mind create an antidote for Animus; Otto injects himself with a small sample and forces a connection with it, allowing H.I.V.E.mind to modify its code. The antidote reprograms Animus.
- Shrouds – H.I.V.E. VTOL aircraft, with cloaking fields making them invisible to infrared and electromagnetic sensors and nearly invisible to optical sensors.
- Dreadnought – Diabolus Darkdoom's permanently-airborne defence craft, designed by Jason Drake to provide G.L.O.V.E. with a permanent command post that was safe and discreet. The craft, equipped with thermoptic camouflage systems like the Shrouds, can harness local weather systems; its Zeus Sphere can conceal it from the world. It is powered by the world's first fusion reactor, harnessing the power of the Sun and removing the need to refuel. The craft is destroyed at the end of Dreadnought.
