= Josh Harper (disambiguation) =

Josh Harper is an American football player.

Josh Harper may also refer to:

- Josh Harper, character in Mates, Dates series
- Josh Harper, character in The Client List played by Matthew Del Negro
