= Rashmi Sirdeshpande =

British children's author

Rashmi Sirdeshpande (née Desai) is a British children's writer and former lawyer. Her book Dadaji's Paintbrush (2022) was nominated for a Jhalak Prize, her book Think Like a Boss: Discover the skills that turn great ideas into CASH (2022) was a 2022 selection for the British World Book Day, and her book Never Show A T-Rex A Book! (2020) won the Queen's Knickers Award in 2021.

== Early life and education ==
Sirdeshpande graduated with a Bachelor of Arts (BA) in Economics, Politics, and International Studies from the University of Warwick. She pursued a Graduate Diploma at the College of Law and a Master of Business Administration (MBA) at London Business School.
