= Mates, Dates series =

Book series by Cathy Hopkins

Mates, Dates is a series of books written for teenagers by Cathy Hopkins. The characters later cross over into her other popular book series Truth, Dare, Kiss or Promise.

The Mates, Dates series is about four best friends: Lucy, Izzie, Nesta and, from the fourth instalment on, TJ. They go through all kinds of teenage problems, from boys, bras, and being broke, to finding one's place in the world. Each book is from one of the friends' perspective, showing exactly how each girl deals with the dilemmas she faces.

== Titles ==
Titles are the same in the U.S. and UK unless otherwise noted.

1. Mates, Dates and Inflatable Bras – A turning point has come in Lucy's life, but she doesn't want it. Lucy is pressured to figure out what she wants for her future. Her best friend Izzie seems to be becoming way too close to new-girl Nesta and she feels increasingly pushed out. But then Wonder-boy crosses the street and her whole life begins to change.
2. Mates, Dates and Cosmic Kisses
3. Mates, Dates and Portobello Princesses (Designer Divas in the U.S) Nesta meets the perfect Simon on a train from hell. But she runs into problems as he comes from a rich, upper-class background and she feels out of her league. To top it all there is Cressida, the ice queen who sneers at her clothes and her life. Can Nesta see what really matters?
4. Mates, Dates and Sleepover Secrets – This book shows TJ's debut as she slowly becomes friends with Lucy. But problems arise as she is running for editor of the school magazine and so is classmate Wendy Roberts, who has it in for her. Will Izzie and Nesta accept her and will her problem of always being "one of the guys" be resolved? And what happens with her crush on the next door neighbor?
5. Mates, Dates and Sole Survivors – Lucy seems to be going through a tumultuous time. When she finally wants to go out with Tony, he already has a girlfriend. But then at a spa weekend she meets Daniel. He seems perfect, good looking, into fashion and reliable. But she begins to feel as if he is taking over her life. Maybe being single isn't so bad after all.
6. Mates, Dates and Mad Mistakes – Izzie is sick of being treated like a kid, so she makes some changes in her life. But is she not ready to face the consequences as new bad boy Josh comes into her life? And her mother is against the whole new Izzie.
7. Mates, Dates and Pulling Power (Sequin Smiles in the U.S.) – The stunningly beautiful Nesta is in agony. She has to have braces. And this happens to be when she meets Luke, a sizzlingly hot young actor like her. In this book Nesta learns more about her family's history and about herself.
8. Mates, Dates and Tempting Trouble – TJ is getting hot under the collar as Nesta's boyfriend Luke declares passionate love for her. Can Nesta's and TJ's friendship continue? And what will TJ's steady boyfriend, Steve, say?
9. Mates, Dates and Great Escapes – Tony, Lucy's boyfriend, keeps wanting to get serious while Lucy wants to cool down. So a school trip to Florence seems to be the perfect escape. There she meets Teddy, a cute and sophisticated American who seems the perfect gentleman. But will she be able to forget Tony?
10. Mates, Dates and Chocolate Cheats — Izzie, who is usually on top of the world, is feeling down. None of her clothes fit. She tries many diets but none of them seem to work; she loses her confidence and starts to become obsessive about losing weight. Can her mates help her out of this hole or will she keep digging herself down?
11. Mates, Dates and Diamond Destiny — Nesta is sick of being thought shallow, so raising money for charity seems a God-sent way of banishing those comments. But there she meets William, friend of her former flame, love-rat Luke. But can she bring herself to trust him?
12. Mates, Dates and Sizzling Summers – TJ is resigned to being single when two boys come along at the same time! She is torn between them, and comes off looking like a two-timer. With the support of her friends, can she overcome this?
13. Mates, Dates and Saving the Planet
14. Mates, Dates and Flirting
15. Mates, Dates Guide to Life, Love and Looking Luscious – Lucy, Izzie, Nesta and TJ's helpful guide of all the tips and tricks they know about boys, beauty, fashion, life and more.
16. Mates, Dates: The Secret Story – The full story of Tony and Lucy's romance is revealed. It tells both Lucy's and Tony's sides of the story.
17. Mate, Dates and You

== Main characters ==
- Lucy Lovering — A very sweet and petite girl who lives in Muswell Hill in northern London. Lucy has blonde hair, has small breasts, and is four feet eight inches tall (later five feet). Her father owns a health store, so there are always strange, healthy New Age meals and products at her house (although Lucy's secret dream is to come home and find out dinner is chicken burgers). Lucy aspires to be a fashion designer, and along the books already makes some clothes for her and her friends. She also likes to make jokes, and has two older brothers, Steve and Lal. Lucy dates Nesta's brother, Tony, on and off throughout the series, but is also seeing others throughout the course of the books. For a while, she dates a seemingly perfect boy, Daniel, but finds he is controlling and suffocating. On a school trip to Italy, Lucy goes out with an Italian-American boy called Teddy Ambosini Junior. Her birthday is May 24, which makes her a Gemini.
- Isobel "Izzie" Foster — A tall, dark-haired girl who is into all sorts of New Age and spiritual stuff, Izzie loves horoscopes, tarot readings, and meditation techniques, and is always showing them to her mates as well. Izzie becomes a vegetarian and she loves the way of life at Lucy's house. Izzie aspires to be a singer/songwriter, and sings with the band King Noz. Izzie's parents are divorced and remarried; she lives with her "straighter-than-straight" mum and step-dad Angus, who has two adult daughters. Her dad is married to Anna and they have a son, Izzie's younger half-brother Tom, who she adores. Izzie firstly goes out with Mark for a little time, but he doesn't return her calls, She then meets Ben (from King Noz) and they start dating. Later they break up and Izzie goes through a bad phase of drinking, smoking and going out with Josh Harper - a stereotypical "wild" boy, although later she realizes her mistakes, and they split up. She also becomes briefly interested in Gabriel from Teen Talk before he tells her he is gay. Her birthday is January 6, making her a Capricorn.
- Nesta Williams — A very beautiful girl, with silky brown hair and dark skin and green eyes. Nesta lives with her parents and her older half-brother, Tony Costello, near Highgate in London. Her father is Italian and a director, and her mother is Jamaican and works as a T.V news presenter, a mix which resulted in her good looks. She first aspires to be a model, and then later to be an actress. Sometimes Nesta is thought to be shallow by her friends, which bothers her a lot. Her friends sometimes tell her she has a big mouth. In difficult situations, she likes to pretend she is a movie heroine. Nesta has to have a brace fitted, and she considers becoming a recluse, until she decides against it. She is considered very beautiful by her friends, and has great success with boys. Although she has dated and snogged a lot of boys, she has dated only a few seriously: Simon, Luke De Biasi and later Luke's best friend William. Her birthday is August 18, making her a Leo.
- Theresa Joanne "TJ" Watts — TJ joins the group when her best friend Hannah moves to South Africa. She slowly becomes friends with Lucy, and soon becomes one of the mates. Her parents are older than most of the parents of girls her age, since she was a "surprise baby" or "a mistake". Because of this, TJ nicknamed them The Wrinklies. TJ's dad is very stern, and everyone calls him Scary Dad. He doesn't like TJ bringing in friends and complains about the noise. She is incredibly smart, but also shy, particularly around boys. TJ says that, around boys, she turns into Noola, the alien girl, and is only able to speak in gibberish. TJ is into reading, and devours books, and also into writing: she becomes the co-editor of the school newspaper and aspires to be a journalist/novelist. She first dates Lucy's brother Steve, and has dates with Ollie Axford and then Nesta's ex-boyfriend, Luke de Biasi. Her birthday is November 24, making her a Sagittarius.

== Minor characters ==
- Tony Costello - Nesta's older half-brother, Italian like his father. His mother died when he was only 6 months but Nesta's mother has always been a mother to him. He is said to be a player, dating a different girl every week. As soon as Lucy sees him she falls for him, and her first snog is with him. They date on and off. Tony develops strong feelings for her and wants to take it to the next level while Lucy wants to cool down. In the end, they do not get back together, but still harbor feelings for one another. It is hinted that they will get back together at a later age due to what Tony says. (Source: Mates, Dates: The Secret Diary)
- Steve Lovering - Lucy's 17-year-old brother and the eldest Lovering sibling, Steve is interested in graphics and books. In Sleepover Secrets he is introduced to TJ but initially pays no notice of her. Lucy and her friends make a plan to help TJ's neighbour fall for TJ with Steve's help, but soon he develops feelings for her. He doesn't reveal his feelings until the end of the book when TJ realizes so herself, and they start dating. In Tempting Trouble TJ develops feelings for Nesta's boyfriend Luke de Biasi, which puts her and Steve's relationship in jeopardy. She dumps him in an email when Luke tells her he too will dump his girlfriend so they can be together.
- Laurence "Lal" Lovering - Lucy's 15-year-old brother, and the middle sibling of the three. Only few years' difference between him and Steve go a long way. He is sort of a player and often acts like a huge jerk - according to Lucy, he has a kiss chart in his bedroom.
- Simon Peddington Lee - Nesta's boyfriend for some time. 18 years old, tall, dark and cute, Simon is very rich and lives in a huge, fancy house. He has a sister named Tanya, whose best friend is Cressida Dudley-Smith. Simon and Nesta really fall for each other, but eventually break up when he has to go to university.
- Tanya Peddington Lee - Simon's younger sister, also the friend of Cressida. The first time, Nesta thinks she is just like Cressida, despite instantly being nice to her, but she soon finds out that Tanya is much friendlier than Cressida. Tanya later dumps Cressida as a friend. She also accidentally gets Nesta into trouble by giving her champagne.
- Cressida Dudley-Smith - Simon's ex-girlfriend and also a friend of Tanya. She is arrogant and snobbish, and is given the nickname "WC" (short for Watercress) by Nesta. She goes after Tony, Nesta's brother, just to spite her. She is said to be tall, blonde, and very pretty.
- Mr and Mrs Lovering - They are really strict about healthy food, whilst their kids dream about chips and normal teenage food. Mr Lovering owns a health food store and Mrs Lovering is a counsellor.
- Dr Richard Watts and Dr Maureen Watts - TJ's parents who are both doctors. They are older than the other girls' parents and when Nesta first sees them she thinks they are TJ's grandparents. They considered moving to Devon for a while, to TJ's horror, but later decided that they'd miss London too much. In book 12, the subject is brought up again when TJ's father has a stroke and they spend some time on the Rame Peninsula in Cornwall, but end up buying a summer home there, instead of moving away.
- Paul Watts - TJ's older brother. He goes travelling for a while during book 4 and he is then said to be a painter/decorator living in Bristol. He is in his twenties.
- Marie Watts - TJ's older sister, who gets married in the eighth book. She is in her twenties.
- Luke de Biasi - Nesta's boyfriend from Book 7 to 8 who she breaks up with after finding out he is three-timing her with TJ and another girl. He is TJ's boyfriend in Book 12.
- William Lewis - Nesta's boyfriend from Book 11, he is Luke's best friend.
