= Sue Hendra =

British writer and illustrator

Suzanne Francis Hendra (born 15 August 1973) is a British writer and illustrator of over 100 books for children, many co-written with Paul Linnet, including Barry the Fish with Fingers. Her books Wanda and the Alien and Supertato have been adapted for television.

== Biography ==
Hendra graduated from the University of Brighton in 1994 where she received a bachelor's degree in technology for graphic design. She currently lives in Brighton where she works in a shared artists' studio. Hendra has worked as an illustrator for Bloomsbury, Walker Books, Oxford University Press, Macmillan and others. Hendra has one daughter named Wanda.

== Work ==
Hendra had been working as an illustrator for several years before she changed her style due to the persuasion of Vicki Willden-Lebrecht of Bright Agency.

Hendra and Paul Linnet's book, Barry the Fish with Fingers was considered colourful and cheerful by Publishers Weekly. Hendra used gouache paint and deliberately created bright, flat compositions for the book, which Kirkus Reviews says introduced an "impossibly endearing little fish." The New York Times wrote that "Hendra's bright and cheerful undersea characters make the ocean seem like a great place to be." No-Bot, the Robot With No Bottom won the Picture Book Award in the 2014 Oxfordshire Book Awards.

The television adaptation of Wanda and the Alien was produced for the United Kingdom's Channel 5 Milkshake programming by Random House Enterprises and Komixx Entertainment. "Wanda and the Alien" also appeared on Nickelodeon and Nick Jr. channels in most countries. "Wanda and the Alien" was shortlisted for the 17th Big Chip Award in 2015.

Along with Linnet, Hendra wrote a book for 2016's World Book Day titled Supertato: Hap-Pea Ever After for pre-school children.
