= International Children's Book Day =

Annual observance

International Children's Book Day (ICBD) is a yearly event sponsored by the International Board on Books for Young People (IBBY), an international non-profit organization. Founded in 1967, the day is observed on or around Hans Christian Andersen's birthday, April 2. Activities include writing competitions, announcements of book awards and events with authors of children's literature.

Each year a different National Section of IBBY has the opportunity to be the international sponsor of ICBD. It decides upon a theme and invites a prominent author from the host country to write a message to the children of the world and a well-known illustrator to design a poster. These materials are used in different ways to promote books and reading. Many IBBY Sections promote ICBD through the media and organize activities in schools and public libraries. Often ICBD is linked to celebrations around children's books and other special events that may include encounters with authors and illustrators, writing competitions or announcements of book awards.

== See also ==
- World Book Day
