= Benjamin Dean (writer) =

British writer (born 1993)

- Born: Benjamin Dean Henry; 8 November 1993 (age 32); Peterborough, England
- Other name: Ben Henry
- Education: Manchester Metropolitan University
- Years active: 2015–present

Benjamin Dean Henry (born 8 November 1993) is an English writer. He began his career as a celebrity reporter for BuzzFeed UK and has since become an author of children's and young adult fiction.

== Early life ==
Dean was born in Peterborough, England, and raised by a single mother. Dean attended Hampton College, Peterborough. He went on to graduate from Manchester Metropolitan University in 2015 with a degree in Creative Writing.

== Career ==
After graduating from university and under the name Ben Henry, Dean was hired to write for BuzzFeed UK. In 2017, he joined the network's celebrity desk as a reporter and interviewer. He entered a short story competition to be part of Juno Dawson's Proud anthology. Though his submitted story about a 17-year-old boy named Charlie was not selected, it caught the attention of agent Alice Sutherland-Hawes, who suggested Dean try writing children's fiction.

Dean signed his first two-book deal in 2020 with Simon & Schuster Children's UK, through which he published his debut middle-grade book Me, My Dad and the End of the Rainbow in 2021. The novel follows Archie Albright as he comes to terms with his parents' divorce. Me, My Dad and the End of the Rainbow won a 2022 Diverse Children's Book Award in the Children's category. It was also shortlisted for the 2022 Waterstones Children's Book Prize in the Younger Fiction category.

In 2022, Dean published his second middle grade book The Secret Sunshine Project and his first young adult (YA) novel The King is Dead. Regarding the latter, Dean had long been "intrigued by the Royal institution... How, through no achievement other than birth, one person or family can be given so much power" and wanted to put a character like himself in those shoes. The King is Dead was shortlisted for Books Are My Bag Awards Young Adult Fiction.

Dean's second YA novel How to Die Famous, a thriller inspired by Dean's time as a celebrity reporter, followed in 2023. How to Die Famous shortlisted for the YA Book Prize and the Jhalak Prize.

In 2024, Dean published his third middle-grade book The Boy Who Fell From the Sky and his third YA novel This Story is a Lie. This Story is a Lie featured on the 2025 World Book Day list. Dean sat on the judges' panel of the 2024 BBC Young Writers' Award alongside Katie Thistleton, Jeffrey Boakye, Katherine Webber and Nicola Dinan.

== Bibliography ==
=== Middle-grade ===
- Me, My Dad and the End of the Rainbow (2021)
- The Secret Sunshine Project (2022)
- The Boy who Fell from the Sky (2024)

=== Young adult ===
- The King is Dead (2022)
- How to Die Famous (2023)
- This Story is a Lie (2024)
- Bury Your Friends (2025)

=== Short stories ===
- "The Ticking Funhouse" in The Very Merry Murder Club (2021)
- in The Super Sunny Murder Club (2024)

== Accolades ==
Year	Award	Category	Title	Result	Ref
2022	Waterstones Children's Book Prize	Younger Fiction	Me, My Dad and the End of the Rainbow	Shortlisted	
2022	Diverse Book Awards	Children's	Me, My Dad and the End of the Rainbow	Won	
2022	Books Are My Bag Readers' Awards	Young Adult Fiction	The King is Dead	Shortlisted	
2024	Jhalak Prize	Children's and Young Adult	How to Die Famous	Shortlisted	
2024	YA Book Prize		How to Die Famous	Shortlisted	
