= Paul Linnet =

English author and illustrator

- Born: Brighton, East Sussex, England
- Education: University of Derby
- Occupations: Children's author; illustrator
- Partner: Sue Hendra
- Writing career
- Period: 2009–present
- Genre: Children's picture books
- Notable works: Supertato series; Barry the Fish with Fingers; No-Bot, the Robot with No Bottom
- Notable awards: Oxfordshire Book Award (2014); Scholastic Laugh Out Loud Award (2016)

Paul Linnet (born April 1968) is an English author and illustrator based in Brighton. Along with British author and illustrator Sue Hendra, Linnet has published over 100 children's books.

Linnet is a regular guest at Edinburgh International Book Festival and the International Literature Festival Dublin.

== Work ==
Sue Hendra and Linnet's children's books include Barry the Fish With Fingers, Egg, and the series of Supertato books, the first of which has sold over a million copies.

Linnet and Hendra wrote Supertato: Hap-Pea Ever After for pre-school children in 2016 for World Book Day, and a handmade book in 2023 titled The Story of a Story for the British Library

The Supertato books topped the children's book charts in 2020, 2021, 2022, 2023 and 2024, and The Guardian described Supertato as "an absolute juggernaut of a book, beloved by kids to the point of hysteria." Linnet and Hendra's Supertato discovered a new audience when Tom Hiddleston read one of their books on CBeebies Bedtime Stories.

In 2022 Supertato was turned into a series for CBeebies on BBC. In late 2023, a range of Supertato merchandise for A/W 2024 was announced via BBC.

In March 2024, to mark the 10th anniversary of the Supertato books, a special edition logo and book was released

In September 2024, Linnet said he was honoured that one of the Supertato books would be adapted for visually impaired children by accessible book publisher Living Paintings, and read by Greg James

== Awards and honors ==
Books Are Rubbish! was a Sunday Times best seller.

Awards for Linnet's books
Year	Title	Award	Result	Ref.
2014	No-Bot	Oxfordshire Book Award for Picture Book	Winner	
2016	I Need a Wee	Scholastic Corporation Laugh Out Loud Award for Best Picture Book	Winner	
2023	Mean Green Time Machine	British Book Awards Children's Book of the Year	Shortlist	

== Selected publications ==
=== Supertato books ===
- Linnet, Paul; Hendra, Sue (2014). Supertato. London: Simon & Schuster Ltd. ISBN 978-0-8570-7447-8.
- Linnet, Paul; Hendra, Sue (2017). Eviltato Vs. Superpea. London: Simon & Schuster Ltd. ISBN 978-1-3985-1170-5.
- Linnet, Paul; Hendra, Sue (2023). Supertato Mean Green Time Machine. London: Simon & Schuster Ltd. ISBN 978-1-3985-1167-5.

=== Standalone books ===
- Linnet, Paul; Hendra, Sue (2015). No-Bot, the Robot with No Bottom. London: Simon & Schuster Ltd. ISBN 978-0-8570-7445-4.
- Hendra, Sue; Linnet, Paul (2019). I Need to Wee!. London: Simon & Schuster Ltd. ISBN 978-1-4814-9039-9.
- Linnet, Paul; Hendra, Sue (2020). Egg. London: MacMillan Children's Books. ISBN 978-1-5098-2748-0.
- Linnet, Paul; Hendra, Sue (2020). Barry The Fish With Fingers. London: Simon & Schuster Ltd. ISBN 978-1-8473-8516-1.
- Hendra, Sue; Linnet, Paul (2020). Christopher Pumpkin. Illustrated by Nick East. Little, Brown and Company. ISBN 978-0-316-42755-5.
- Hendra, Sue; Linnet, Paul (2021). I Spy Island. London: Simon & Schuster Ltd. ISBN 978-1-4711-9627-0.

== Easter Eggs ==
In a number of the Supertato books, there's a hidden 'Sweetcorn Guy'.
