= Cathy Hopkins =

English author

- Born: 23 January 1953 (age 73); Manchester, England
- Occupation: Author
- Writing career
- Period: 1987–present
- Genres: drama; young adult fiction

Cathy Hopkins (born 23 January 1953) is an English writer with over 70 published titles. She has written for fiction for children, teens and adults.

== Early life ==
Hopkins was born in Manchester, but lived in Kenya from the age of five until she was eleven and her family returned to England. She also sang with a rock and roll band named Driving Rock and the Rockettes, which toured local colleges and universities as the warm-up band to groups such as Wizard and The Average White Band.

Her late father wrote under the name Billy Hopkins. His titles include Our Kid, Kate's Story, High Hopes, Going Places, Anything Goes, Whatever Next, Tommy's World and Big Mama.

== Personal life ==
Hopkins lives in Bath, South West England with her husband Steve and has 3 cats. She has five brothers.

== Books ==
Hopkins started writing books in 1987, collaborating with cartoonist Gray Jolliffe on a series of humour books. She has had over 70 books published, many in 33 countries, including the Mates, Dates series, the Truth, Dare, Kiss or Promise series, the Cinnamon Girl series (published by Piccadilly Press) and the Zodiac Girls series (published by Kingfisher/Macmillan Publishers) and the Million Dollar Mates series published by Simon and Schuster. She also wrote four stand alone novels for teenagers which are ''Holy Moley, I'm a Dead Dude'' for Chickenhouse, Playlist for a Broken Heart and Love At Second Sight and A Home for Shimmer for Simon and Schuster.

Cathy started writing for the older market with her first novel for adults which was published in March 2017 by HarperCollins and is called The Kicking the Bucket List. Her second title, Dancing Over The Hill, was published in January 2018 and her third novel titled Blast From the Past was published in February 2019. Her fourth book for Harpercollins, A Vintage Friendship, was published as an e-book in August 2020 and was followed by the paperback in February 2021.

Hopkins was shortlisted for the Queen of Teen award in 2010.

=== Published by Harpercollins ===
The Kicking the Bucket List (2017) Dancing over the Hill (2018) Blast From the Past (2019) A Vintage Friendship (2020)

=== Mates, Dates series ===
- Mates, Dates and Inflatable Bras (2001)
- Mates, Dates and Cosmic Kisses (2001)
- Mates, Dates and Portobello Princesses (US title Mates, Dates, and Designer Divas) (2001)
- Mates, Dates and Sleepover Secrets (2002)
- Mates, Dates and Sole Survivors (2002)
- Mates, Dates and Mad Mistakes (2003)
- Mates, Dates and Pulling Power (US title Mates, Dates, and Sequin Smiles) (2003)
- Mates, Dates and Tempting Trouble (2004)
- Mates, Dates and Great Escapes (2004)
- Mates, Dates and Chocolate Cheats (2005)
- Mates, Dates and Diamond Destiny (2005)
- Mates, Dates and Sizzling Summers (2007)
- Mates, Dates and Saving the Planet (2008)
- Mates, Dates and Flirting (2008)
- Mates, Dates: The Secret Story (2009)
- The Mates, Dates Guide to Life, Love and Looking Luscious (2005)

=== 3-in-1 books ===
- Mates, Dates Utterly Fabulous (books 1 - 3) (2008)
- Mates, Dates Perfectly Divine (books 4 - 6) (2008)
- Mates, Dates Absolutely Amazing (books 7-9) (2009)
- Mates, Dates Strictly Gorgeous (books 10-12) (Releases in June 2010)

=== Truth, Dare, Kiss or Promise series ===
- White Lies and Barefaced Truths (2002)
- Pop Princess (2002)
- Teen Queens and Has-Beens (2003)
- Double Dare (2004)
- Starstruck (2005)
- Midsummer Meltdown (2005)
- Love Lottery (2006)
- All Mates Together (2006)

=== Cinnamon Girl series ===
- This Way to Paradise (2007)
- Starting Over (2007)
- Looking for a Hero (2008)
- Expecting to Fly (2009)

Published by Macmillan

=== Zodiac Girl series ===
- From Geek to Goddess (2007) Gemini
- Recipe for Rebellion (2007) Sagittarius
- Discount Diva (2007) Taurus
- Brat Princess (2007) Leo
- Star Child (2008) Virgo
- Double Trouble (2009) Scorpio
- Dancing Queen (2009) Aries
- Bridesmaids' Club (2009) Libra

Published by Simon and Schuster

- Million Dollar Mates series
- Playlist for a Broken Heart
- Love at Second Sight
- A Home for Shimmer

Published by Barrington Stoke:

- Mum Never Did Learn to Knock
- The Valentine's Day Kitten
