= Giles Andreae =

British writer and illustrator

- Born: 16 March 1966 (age 60); London, England
- Education: Eton College, Berkshire; University of Oxford
- Writing career
- Notable works: Giraffes Can't Dance, Winnie-the-Pooh: The Great Heffalump Hunt, Captain Flinn and the Pirate Dinosaurs, Purple Ronnie merchandise, Edward Monkton books
- Website: gilesandreaemusic.com

Giles Andreae (born 16 March 1966) is a British writer and illustrator. He is the creator of the stickman poet Purple Ronnie and the humorous artist/philosopher Edward Monkton, and is the author of Giraffes Can't Dance and many other books for children.

== Early life ==
Andreae attended Eton College before attending Worcester College, Oxford University, from 1985 – 88. During his final year at Oxford, and while debuting early versions of his signature Purple Ronnie character, Andreae developed Hodgkin's lymphoma, a cancer of the lymph glands, and began an intensive course of chemotherapy and radiotherapy the day before his final exams began. He managed to sit some of his papers, and the university awarded him an upper-second-class degree. Upon graduation, Andreae worked as a trainee account manager at an advertising agency, while Purple Ronnie took on an overarching joie de vivre theme.

== Career ==
=== Purple Ronnie ===
Andreae debuted the Purple Ronnie character in 1987 as a stage act for an Oxford revue before picking eight poems to appear on greetings cards with simple black and white line drawings akin to doodles. He initially self-distributed the cards throughout Oxford's stationery shops, but later signed a deal with an established greetings card publisher.

The illustrator drew the cartoon in a stick man style with a smiley face and a large oval body. Andreae typically depicts Ronnie as a comic poet, the cartoon's rhyming captions being written in a simple style and including mild taboo language. The cartoons often feature light-hearted, toilet humour-themed poems about belching or flatulence. The character featured on greetings cards, books, T-shirts and toiletries, and soft drinks company, Vimto also used the character in several advertising campaigns. Andreae sold Purple Ronnie to Coolabi in April 2007 in a deal worth £4.8 million. Since then, the company has tried to break into the US market by adapting the designs and language for American audiences and digital media.

=== Edward Monkton ===
Andreae also writes under the pen name Edward Monkton; a self-described "philosopher, poet, artist and interesting fellow". Monkton is best known for A Lovely Love Story, a story about two dinosaurs falling in love, which has become a popular reading at weddings. Other Monkton stories include The Pig of Happiness, a YouTube video of which Andreae financed and created after recovering from a bout of clinical depression. Andreae expanded on The Pig of Happiness to create a series of short animated films for the BBC entitled World of Happy.

Like his predecessor Purple Ronnie, Edward Monkton cartoons typically feature distinctive black-line illustrations.

=== Giraffes Can't Dance ===
Giraffes Can't Dance is Andreae's bestselling children's book about self-esteem and negative stereotypes. The book follows a simple rhyming pattern and full-colour illustrations by Guy Parker-Rees. Since its release in 1999, the book has undergone several adaptations for children's television and theatre. Publishing house, Hachette Books have translated the book into 34 languages, and the book remains a perennial bestseller in the UK and the US with reported sales of 10 million copies worldwide.

=== Winnie-the-Pooh: The Great Heffalump Hunt ===
In 2017, Andreae's book, Winnie-the-Pooh: The Great Heffalump Hunt, was released. It was commissioned by A.A. Milne's publishers to celebrate the ninetieth anniversary of the publication of Milne and Shepard's first Winnie-the-Pooh book.

=== Other works ===
Andreae collaborated on a series of children's books with illustrator Emma Dodd called the I Love series. The series includes titles such as I Love My Grandad, I Love My Daddy and I Love My Mummy. Other popular titles include Rumble in the Jungle with illustrator David Wojtowycz, Pants, and Captain Flinn and the Pirate Dinosaurs.

Several of his books have been adapted for television and theatre.

== Personal life ==
Andreae lives with his wife, Victoria, with whom he has four children, beside the River Thames in Oxfordshire, England. Before that, he lived in Notting Hill, London, where he shared a studio with screenwriter Richard Curtis.
