= Guy Parker-Rees =

English illustrator and writer of children's books (born 1959)

Guy Parker-Rees (born 1959) is an illustrator and writer of children's books.

== Biography ==
Parker-Rees studied literature and philosophy at the University of York. He lives in Brighton with his wife and three children.

Before becoming a children's book writer and illustrator, Parker-Rees worked as an art teacher for people with learning difficulties and as an art therapist in a social-services day center.

Parker-Rees's work includes illustrating for other writers, most notably Giles Andreae, as well as creating his own children's books. His name featured on the lists of the top-fifty most-borrowed illustrators from U.K. public libraries from July 2015 to June 2016.

== Giraffes Can't Dance ==
Giraffes Can't Dance is Parker-Rees's most successful picture book, an international bestseller on amazon.co.uk and number-one bestselling picture book in the United States. As of March 2019, it had sold over four million copies worldwide.

== Other books ==
- Be Brave Little Penguin
- Dylan the Doctor
- Dylan the Shopkeeper
- Twist and Hop Minibeast Bop
- Fabulous Pie
- Never Ask a Dinosaur to Dinner
- Tom and Millie's Whizzy Busy People
- Tom and Millie's Great Big Treasure Hunt
- Diggory Digger and the Dinosaurs
- The Jungle Run
- Ants in Your Pants
- Jolly Olly Octopus
- Farmer Joe and the Music Show
- All Afloat on Noah's Boat
- The Chimpanzees of Happytown
- Perky Little Penguins
- Bumpus Jumpus Dinosaurumpus
- Down by the Cool of the Pool
- K Is for Kissing a Cool Kangaroo
- Spookyrumpus
- Along Came a Bedtime
- Ducky Dives In
- Come to Tea on Planet Zum-Zee
- Quiet!
- The Hippo-not-amus
- Big Bad Bunny
- Little Jim Lost

== Awards and honours ==
Sheffield Book Award 2016

- Giraffes Can't Dance
- Spookyrumpus

Portsmouth Book Award

- Giraffes Can't Dance
- Spookyrumpus

Blue Peter Book Award shortlist 2004

- Quiet!

FCBG Children's Book Award 2016

- Fabulous Pie

== See also ==
- List of British artists
- List of children's literature writers
- List of English writers
- List of illustrators
