= World Book Day =

Annual event to promote reading, publishing, and copyright

- UNESCO World Book and Copyright Day 2012 poster
- Official name: World Book and Copyright Day
- Also called: WBD
- Observed by: All UN Member States
- Type: International
- Date: 23 April
- Next time: 23 April 2027
- Frequency: annual
- Related to: Saint George's Day in Catalonia; World Book Day (UK and Ireland)

World Book Day, also known as World Book and Copyright Day or International Day of the Book, is an annual event organized by UNESCO (United Nations Educational, Scientific and Cultural Organization) to promote reading, publishing, and copyright. The first World Book Day was celebrated on 23 April in 1995, and continues to be recognized on that day. A related event in the United Kingdom and Ireland, also called World Book Day, is observed in March. On the occasion of World Book and Copyright Day, UNESCO along with the advisory committee from the major sectors of the book industry, select the World Book Capital for one year. Each designated World Book Capital City carries out a program of activities to celebrate and promote books and reading. In 2024, Strasbourg was designated as the World Book Capital.

== Date selection ==
The original idea was conceived in 1922 by Vicente Clavel, director of Cervantes publishing house in Barcelona, as a way to honour the author Miguel de Cervantes and boost the sales of books. It was first celebrated in Spain on 7 October 1926, Cervantes' birthday, before being moved to his death date, 23 April, in 1930. In Catalonia, the celebration coincided with Saint George's Day (Catalan: Diada de Sant Jordi) in honour to its patron saint and, as a result, the Book Day merged with the original festivity and continues with great popularity in Catalonia, where it is also referred to as The Day of Books and Roses.

In 1995, UNESCO decided that the World Book and Copyright Day would be celebrated on 23 April, as the date is also the anniversary of the death of William Shakespeare and Inca Garcilaso de la Vega, as well as that of the birth or death of several other prominent authors. (In a historical coincidence, Shakespeare and Cervantes died on the same date—23 April 1616—but not on the same day, as at the time, Spain used the Gregorian calendar and England used the Julian calendar; Shakespeare actually died 11 days after Cervantes died, on 3 May of the Gregorian calendar, and Cervantes died on 22 April but was buried a day after, on 23 April.)

== World Book Day by region ==
=== World Book Capital ===
The World Book Capital (WBC) is an initiative of UNESCO which recognises cities for promoting books and fostering reading for a year starting on 23 April, World Book and Copyright Day. Cities designated as UNESCO World Book Capital carry out activities with the aim of encouraging a culture of reading in all ages and sharing UNESCO's values.

UNESCO adopted the 31c/Resolution 29, in 2001, establishing the World Book Capital programme and naming Madrid as the first WBC city in 2001. The advisory committee is composed of UNESCO, the International Publishers Association, the International Federation of Library Associations and Institutions, the International Authors Forum and the International Booksellers Federation.

=== Spain ===
In Spain, Book Day began in 1926, being celebrated annually on 7 October, the date that Miguel de Cervantes was believed to have been born. But it was considered more appropriate to celebrate this day in a more pleasant season for walking and browsing the books in the open-air, spring was much better than autumn. So in 1930 King Alfonso XIII approved the change in celebration of Book Day to 23 April, the supposed date of the death of Cervantes.

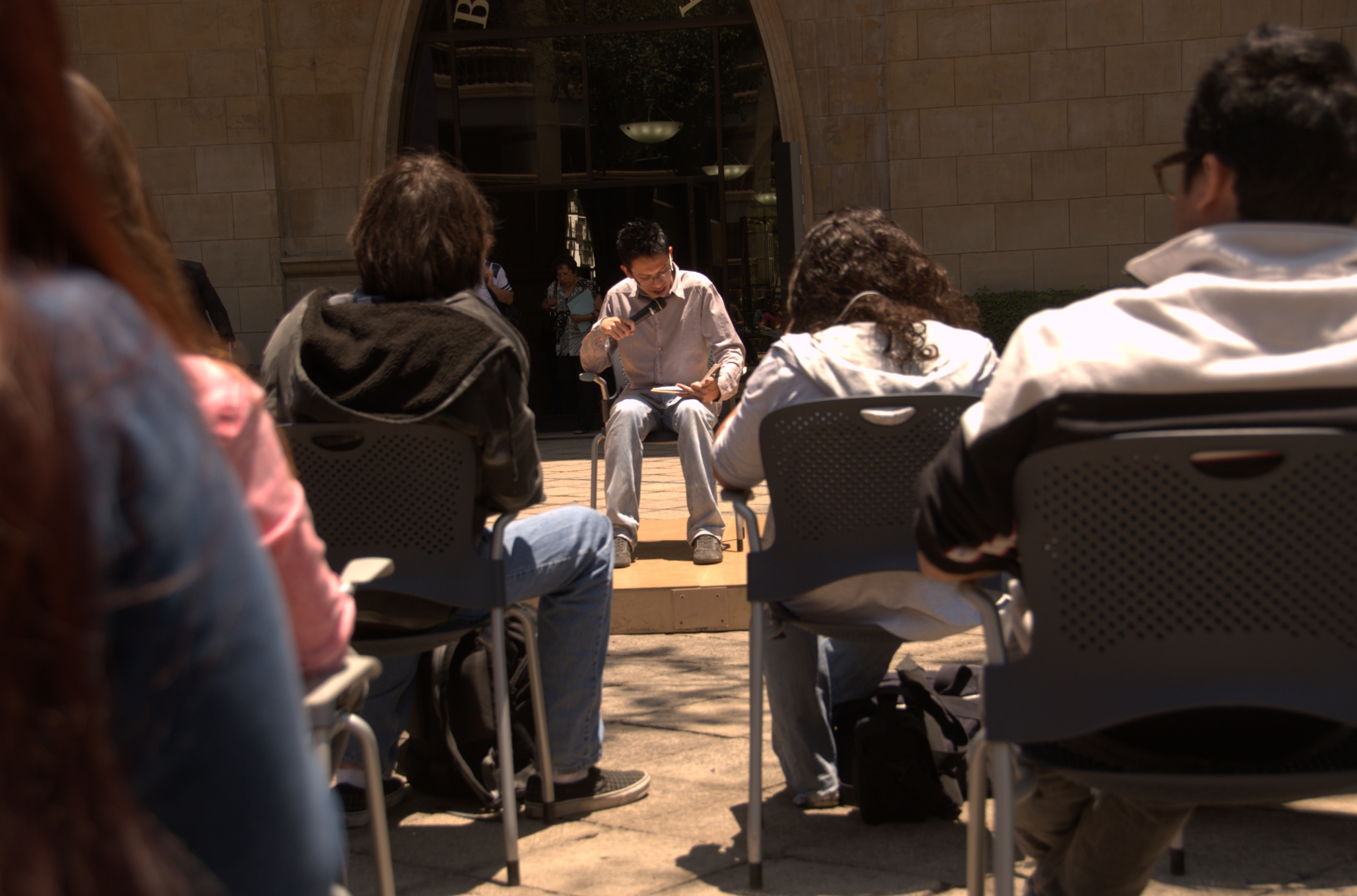
Forum on reading aloud held outside the campus library at the Monterrey Institute of Technology and Higher Education, Mexico City for the occasion

=== Sweden ===
In Sweden, the day is known as Världsbokdagen ("World Book Day") and the copyright aspect is seldom mentioned. Normally celebrated on 23 April, it was moved to 13 April in the year 2000 and 2011 to avoid a clash with Easter.

=== United Kingdom and Ireland ===
In the United Kingdom and Ireland, World Book Day is a charity event in March, held annually on the first Thursday and coinciding with the release of special editions. The annual celebration on 23 April is World Book Night, an event organized by independent charity The Reading Agency.

=== United States ===
In Kensington, Maryland, the International Day of the Book is celebrated with a street festival on the Sunday closest to 26 April. In 2020, the 15th Annual Kensington Day of the Book Festival was cancelled due to the COVID-19 pandemic.

=== India ===
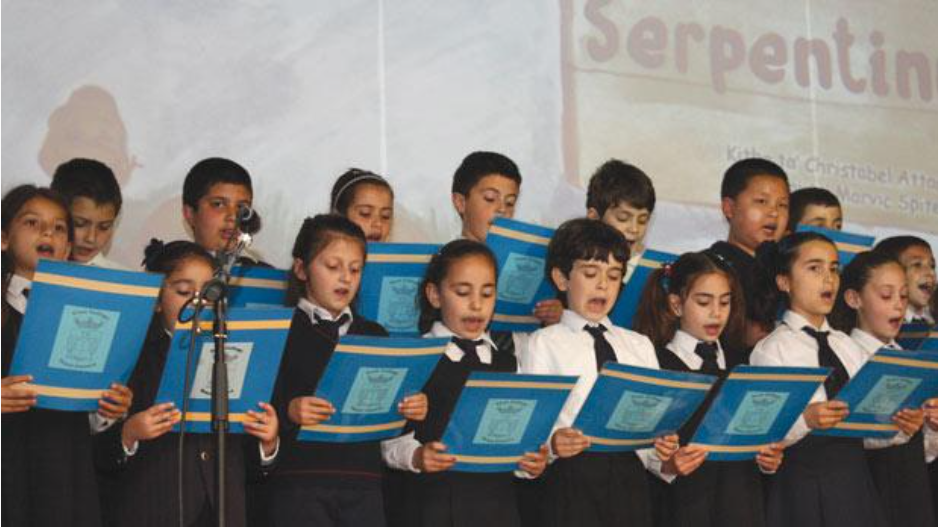
World Book Day in a school in Victoria, Malta

World Book Day is celebrated in India on 23 April. It is commemorated in many parts of India to encourage readership and raise awareness about the importance of disseminating knowledge.

=== Malta ===
In Malta, the day is known as Jum il-Ktieb (Book Day) and is celebrated on 23 April around the national libraries. Moreover, the National Literacy Agency in Malta celebrates a World Book Week. In 2026 this was celebrated between 2 and 6 March.

== Gallery ==
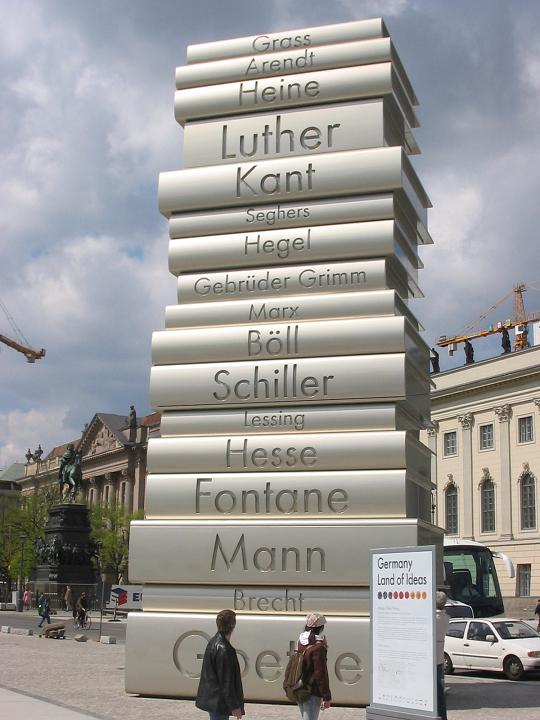
Modern Book Printing, fourth sculpture (from six) of the Berliner Walk of Ideas. Unveiling: 21 April 2006.

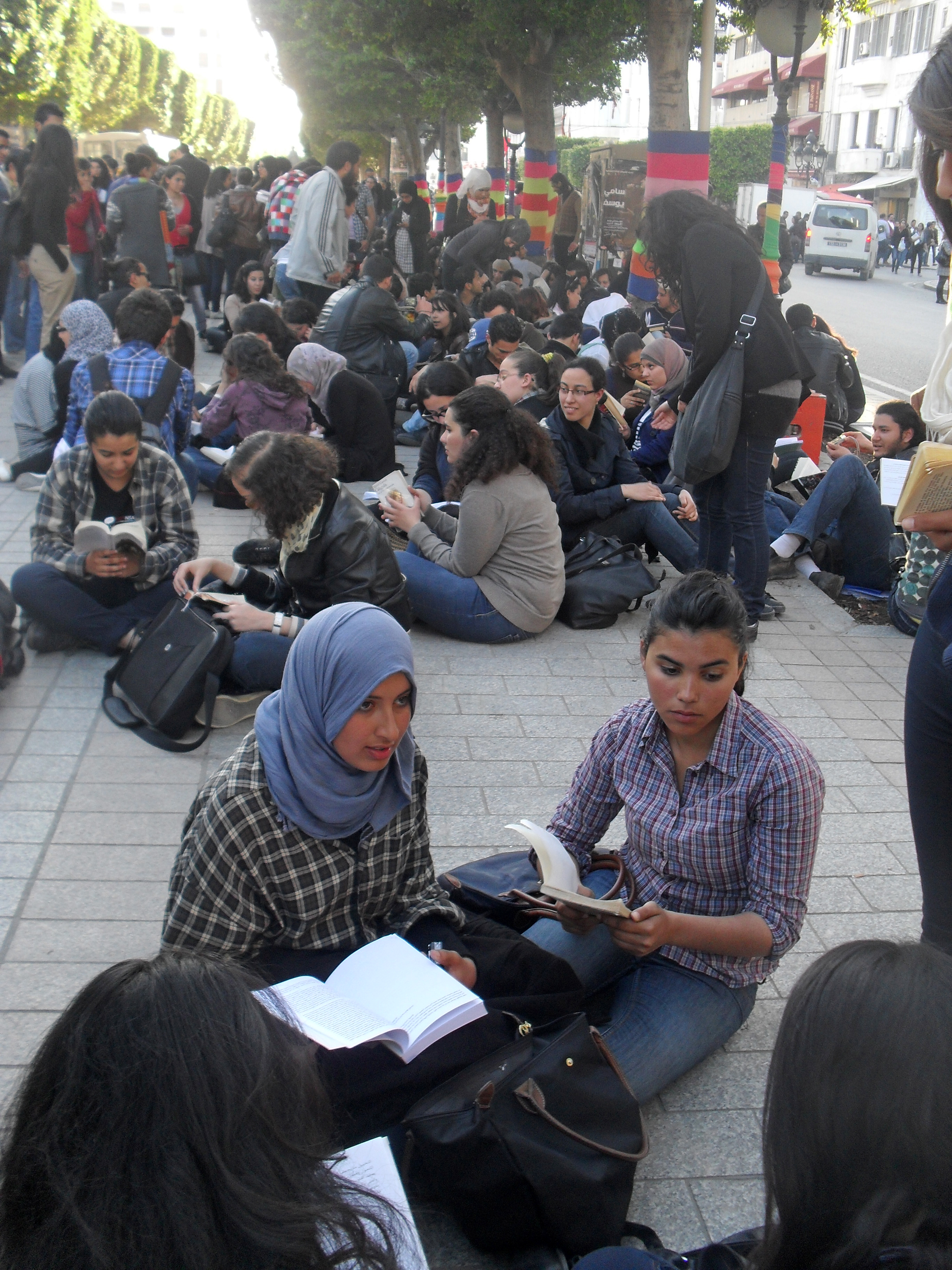
Tunisian students perform reading on the street, on the 2012 World Book Day

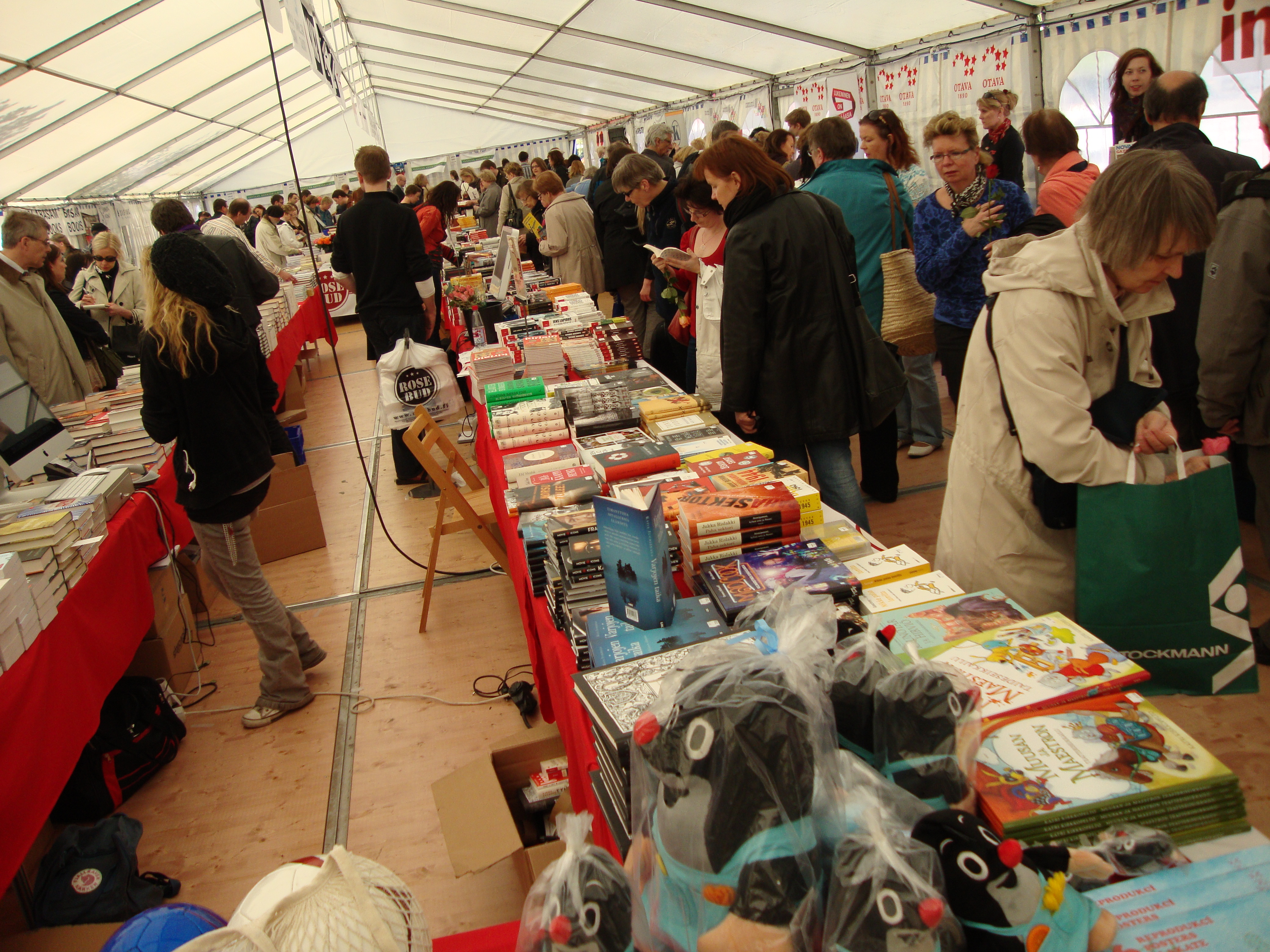
Book fair in Helsinki, Finland, on World Book Day 2011

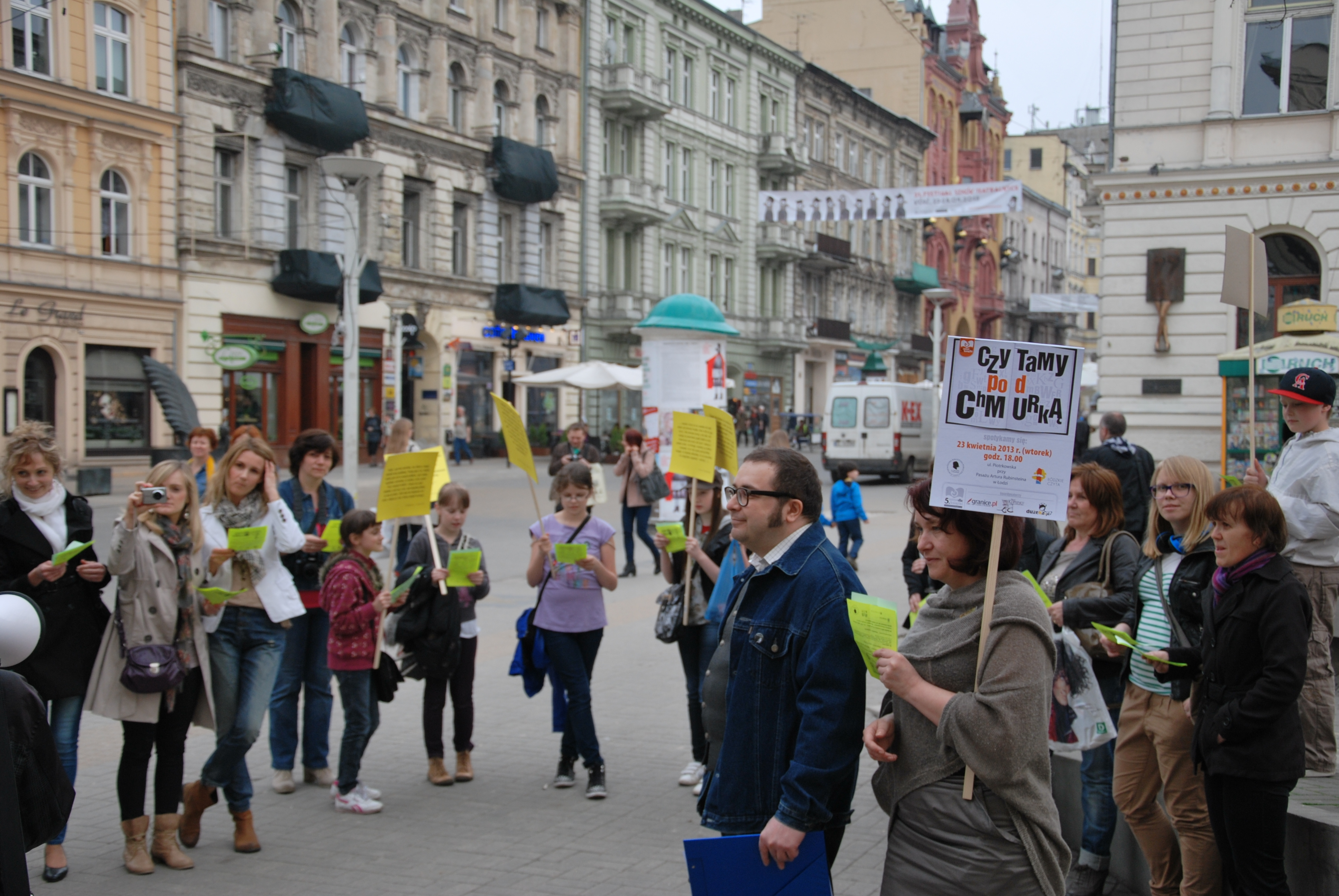
"5-minute reading" campaign (rather, the 5-minute reading content just printed one sheet of paper) at Łódź, Poland, in 2013

== See also ==
- International Children's Book Day
- World Storytelling Day
- World Intellectual Property Day
- Inventors' Day
- UN English Language Day
