= Truth, Dare, Kiss or Promise =

Book series by Cathy Hopkins

Truth, Dare, Kiss or Promise is a series of books written for teenagers by English author Cathy Hopkins. The characters later cross-over and meet the characters of her other popular book series Mates, Dates.

The Truth, Dare, Kiss or Promise series is based upon five best friends who go through problems and new experiences together adding a twist of their favorite game Truth, Dare, Kiss or Promise. Each book is from one of the friends' perspectives, showing exactly how each deals with the dilemmas they face.

== Titles ==
- White Lies (Originally named White Lies and Barefaced Truths) — Cat feels confused and guilty when she kisses Ollie Axford, her friend Becca's big crush. Not to mention trying to keep it a secret from Lia Axford his sister and her new friend at school. Through all this, Cat starts to wonder if it is right to tell lies for peace? Can the truth be too hurtful? And can she really be trusted?
- Pop Princess — Becca is considered to be a dreamer, never achieving as much as she could but after she's dared to enter the singing contest; Pop Princess her whole life feels like its changing as she starts to wonder could her dreams really come true?
- Teen Queens (Originally named Teen Queens and Has-Beens) — Lia is getting bullied by a group of girls after she starts dating the school heartthrob and the bullies' leader's crush. Though Lia tries everything she can to get them off her case from asking to be friends to trying to blend into the background, soon after, Lia starts to question: can she ever have a normal life?
- Starstruck — Squidge is really pleased when he gets a summer job working on a film set. He's even more thrilled when the main star of the film Savannah adopts him as her personal runner. But when he starts to spend the most of his time with a top-notch actress, will he be able to stay faithful to his girlfriend Lia or will he let Savannah use him as someone much more?
- Double Dare — Mac is so excited when he's asked to show his artwork to a magazine and feels on top of the world when he meets Emily. However, his old friend Roz is the one who got him the magazine deal and she, having liked him since forever, devices a plan to use it as an advantage against Mac in any way. Can Mac live his dream and not have to go out with Roz? If not, is he willing to pay the price?
- Midsummer Meltdown — Lia is going to Morocco with her family for her mum's fortieth birthday, along with the addition of her best of friends, Cat, Becca and Lia. Can she control herself when her old flame Michael Bradley shows up? Will she be able to fight temptation with her boyfriend millions of miles away?
- Love Lottery — Becca is really worried when her parents start fighting, and wonders if they would split up. Her troubles only get worse when her friends meet some new girls from London (Mates, Dates cross-over) and she thinks she's been replaced. Can Becca's parents sort out their problems before it's too late? And can Becca face up to the girls from London and learn that maybe they are not as bad as they might seem?
- All Mates Together — The final in the series when the girls come down from London to see Cat's father's wedding. In this final book, many things will change in Cat's life, but are these changes for the better? Will her dad's wedding go to plan or will painful memories and cold feet come to haunt her family?

== Main characters ==
- Catherine "Cat" Kennedy — A very sweet and good-hearted girl who lives in Cawsand and is very mature as she had to act like a surrogate mother to her three younger siblings (Luke who is eleven, Joe who is nine, and Emma who is six). Cat has dark hair and is five foot (as said in Love Lottery, and her and Lucy have the same height). Her father owns a village store which sells many things, although mainly organic food products from her house. Cat goes out with Lia's brother, Ollie once or twice. At the start of the series she dates with Squidge but they break up because there is no chemistry left. At the end of the series Cat is dating a boy called Jamie.
- Rebecca "Becca" Howard — A red-haired and tall girl who is a typical dreamer like her dad, she is a daddy's girl. Becca aspires to be a singer/songwriter, and sings in the band Diamond Hearts. Becca parents are getting divorced (this is only known from the book Love Lottery). Becca initially goes out with Mac from the second book to the fifth in the series but she decides to break it off. Mac feels the same way. Then she meets Lal Lovering and she dates him to take her mind off her parents fighting. Later they break up and Becca shows an interest in his brother Steve Lovering and they start going out.
- Ophelia Moonbeam "Lia" Axford — A very beautiful girl, with silky white blonde hair. Her father is a retired rockstar in his forties and her mother was a model and is the best looking forty-year-old in Cawsand. She is the youngest in the family. Her sister Star works as a model and lives in London, where also her brother Ollie goes to school. Lia, however, preferred going to a school near home. She is often called the quiet one in the family and is the only one who doesn't want lime light. Sometimes Lia feels uncomfortable because she is rich compared to her friends but in time she relaxes more about it. Lia is dating Squidge in the series and they are often said to be the couple in love.
- Jack "Squidge" Squires — Squidge is the popular guy, he's friends with almost everyone at his school. Cat describes his parents as being the most important people in Cawsand as his dad is the only local mechanic in the area and his mum is the only hairdresser in Cawsand. Squidge loves film and capturing life, and plans to work on a film set when he's older. At the start of the series he dates Cat and then from the third book onwards he dates Lia and people often call them a couple in love.
- Tom "Mac" Macey - Mac is very artistic and wants to be a cartoonist when he is older. He often thinks of himself as a ladies man but doesn't have the heart to leave someone hanging. He gets this from being the oldest of him and his sister, Jade, and from being the only man in the house after his parents got divorced and he moved down to Cawsand. He misses his home in London and up until the fifth book wanted to live there.

== Minor characters ==
- Ollie Axford - Lia's only brother. He is said to be quite a player, having a different girl on a date every week and sometimes not even that long but he shows an interest in Cat.
- Star Axford - Lia's older sister. Is a model and lives in London in a five star apartment, lets Lia, Becca and Squidge stay there in some of the books. She is said to have a boyfriend in Double Dare.
- Jade Macey - Mac's younger sister. Is stuck up and is a good singer. In Pop Princess she goes against Becca to win the title of Pop Princess and comes second. At one point she was also in the band Diamond Hearts. In the first book she kisses Ollie. Other than this she is not really in the series until book five (Double Dare) where she invites Roz down to see Mac and adds to his problems.
- Lucy Lovering - One of the girls from London is a main character in the Mates, Dates series.
- Izzie Foster - One of the girls from London is a main character in the Mates, Dates Series and sings with Becca in the book Love Lottery.
- Nesta Williams - One of the girls from London is a main character in the Mates, Dates series.
- T.J Watts - One of the girls from London is a main character in the Mates, Dates Series.
