= Mark Walden =

English writer (born 1972)

- Born: 3 October 1972 (age 54)
- Education: BA in English Literature, MA in Twentieth Century Literature, Film and Television.
- Occupations: Writer, Video games designer/producer
- Spouse: Sarah Walden
- Children: Megan Walden
- Relatives: Susan Walden
- Writing career
- Language: English
- Period: 2006 to present
- Genres: Fantasy action, Evil
- Notable works: H.I.V.E. (series), Earthfall
- Notable awards: Richard and Judy's 'Best Kids' books ever 9+

Mark Walden (born 1972) is the author of the H.I.V.E. series of novels. He was a senior producer in charge of developing PlayStation games for Sony before taking up writing full-time.

== Personal life ==
Walden spent seven years at Bablake School, an independent co-educational day school in Coventry, before studying for a BA in English Literature and an MA in Twentieth Century Literature, Film and Television at Newcastle University. Walden has a wife, Sarah, a daughter, Megan, and a cat called Marge. He spent ten years as a video games designer and producer before leaving the games industry to write and become a full-time father.

H.I.V.E., published in September 2006, was Walden's debut novel. It was selected as a winner in Richard and Judy's 'Best Kids' Books Ever' competition and Paramount Pictures has optioned the film rights. Walden has since produced seven more books in the series, with another, Aftershock, released in August 2011 and the semi-sequel Deadlock, released in June 2013. Walden describes himself as "the world's laziest man".

== H.I.V.E. ==
H.I.V.E. (aka. Higher Institute of Villainous Education) is a series of young adult fiction novels by Mark Walden. H.I.V.E. is a top secret school in which children learn the skills to become criminal masterminds. Only children who have already been noticed having some villainous skill are accepted to this school. Otto Malpense is a thirteen-year-old criminal genius, who has been handpicked along with others-the smartest, most athletic, technologically advanced kids in the world to be part of H.I.V.E. But once Otto has entered the school, he discovers that it is not all what it seems, and sets out to unfold the mystery behind the school and its organization.
