= World Book Day (UK and Ireland) =

Annual charity event

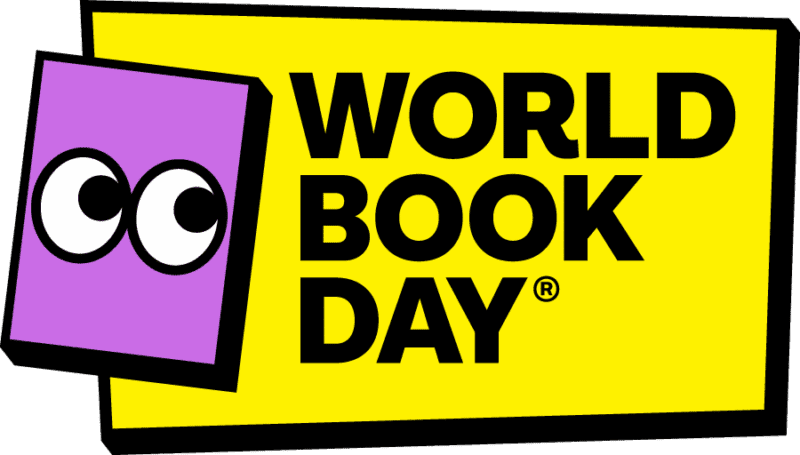
- Logo used since 2026.
- Observed by: Ireland; United Kingdom
- Type: Charity event
- Date: first Thursday in March
- 2027 date: 4 March
- Frequency: Annual
- First time: 23 April 1998; 28 years ago
- Started by: UNESCO
- Related to: World Book Day; World Book Night

World Book Day (Irish: Lá Domhanda na Leabhar) is a charity event held annually in the United Kingdom and Ireland on the first Thursday in March. On World Book Day, every child in full-time education in the UK and Ireland is provided with a voucher to be spent on books; the event was first celebrated in the United Kingdom in 1998.

The event is the local manifestation of the original, global World Book Day organized by UNESCO to promote reading, publishing, and copyright, and widely observed on 23 April. Organizers in the UK moved the observance to avoid clashes with Easter school holidays and with Saint George's Day. Book publishers in Ireland decided to bring World Book Day to Ireland a number of years later.

Conversely, the World Book Night event organized by independent charity The Reading Agency is held on 23 April.

== History ==
The United Kingdom's own version of World Book Day began in 1998, launched by Prime Minister Tony Blair at the Globe Theatre in London. Several million schoolchildren in the UK were given a special £1 World Book Day Book Token which could be redeemed against any book in any UK bookshop. A specially created WBD anthology priced at £1 was also published. All World Book Day point of sale and the £1 book carried the special World Book Day logo to help unify the initiative through all outlets.

Since then, World Book Day UK has followed a similar pattern, gradually growing each year to encompass more initiatives, such as Spread The Word, Quick Reads Initiative and Books for Hospitals. Every year, the number of children receiving a World Book Day Book Token has increased.

In 2000, instead of a single £1 special anthology, four separate £1 books were published, covering a wider age-range. Since then, each year has seen a new set of special £1 books published.

In 2006, World Book Day began its support of and association with the Quick Reads initiative for adult emergent readers.

In 2007, World Book Day celebrated its 10th anniversary with the publication of 10 £1/1,50€ books. Since then every child in full-time education in the UK and Ireland is entitled to receive a £1/1,50€ World Book day Book token every year. They can swap their WBD token for one of specially-produced WBD books or they can get £1/€1 off a full-price book or audio book priced £2.99 or euro equivalent.

== Administration ==
World Book Day is a registered charity in England and Wales. It does not raise funds for itself but does support Book Aid International and Readathon as its nominated charities, encouraging schools to hold special fundraising events for children less fortunate than themselves. World Book Day is not funded by the British Government although the Quick Reads element does receive support from ACE, DIUS and NIACE. The funding for World Book Day activities comes from the major sponsor, National Book Tokens and the UK book trade (publishers and booksellers).

Funding also comes from Foras na Gaeilge, An Post and Vision Ireland.
