= Carnegie Medal for Illustration =

Award for illustrators

The Carnegie Medal for Illustration (until 2022 the Kate Greenaway Medal) is a British award that annually recognises "distinguished illustration in a book for children". It is conferred upon the illustrator by the Chartered Institute of Library and Information Professionals (CILIP) which inherited it from the Library Association.

The Medal was first named after the 19th-century English illustrator of children's books Kate Greenaway (1846–1901). It was established in 1955 and inaugurated in 1956 for 1955 publications, but no work that year was considered suitable. The first Medal was awarded in 1957 to Edward Ardizzone for Tim All Alone (Oxford, 1956), which he also wrote. That first Medal was dated 1956. Since 2007 the Medal has been dated by its presentation during the year following publication. This medal is a companion to the Carnegie Medal for Writing which recognises an outstanding work of writing for children and young adults.

Nominated books must be first published in the U.K. during the preceding school year (September to August), with English-language text if any.

The award by CILIP is a gold Medal and £500 worth of books donated to the illustrator's chosen library. Since 2000 there is also a £5000 cash prize from a bequest by the children's book collector Colin Mears.

== Rules ==
Library and information professionals in CILIP nominate books in September and October, after the close of the publication year. A panel of 12 children's librarians in CILIP's youth interest group judges books for both the Writing and Illustration awards. The shortlist is announced in March and the winner in June.

Candidates must be published in the U.K. during the preceding year (September to August). They must be published for young people, and published in the U.K. originally or within three months in case of co-publication. English must be the language of any text, or one of dual languages. "All categories of illustrated books for children and young people are eligible."

CILIP specifies numerous points of artistic style, format, and visual experience, and also "synergy of illustration and text" that should be considered. Furthermore, "The whole work should provide pleasure from a stimulating and satisfying visual experience which leaves a lasting impression. Illustrated work needs to be considered primarily in terms of its graphic elements, and where text exists particular attention should be paid to the synergy between the two."

== Winners ==
Through 2025 there have been 69 Medals awarded in 70 years, covering 1955 to 2024 publications. No eligible book published in 1955 or 1958 was considered suitable. From 2007 the medals are dated by the year of presentation; previously by the calendar year of British publication.

Medal winners
Date	Illustrator	Title	Author (if different)	Publisher
2026	Kate Rolfe		Wiggling Words	Two Hoots
2025	Olivia Lomenech Gill	Clever Crow	Chris Butterworth	Walker Books
2024	Aaron Becker	The Tree and the River		Walker Books
2023	Jeet Zdung	Saving Sorya: Chang and the Sun Bear	Trang Nguyen	Kingfisher
2022	Danica Novgorodoff	Long Way Down	Jason Reynolds	Faber & Faber
2021	Sydney Smith	Small in the City	—	Walker Books
2020	Shaun Tan	Tales from the Inner City	—	Walker Books
2019	Jackie Morris	The Lost Words	Robert Macfarlane	Hamish Hamilton
2018	Sydney Smith	Town is by the Sea	Joanne Schwartz	Walker Books
2017	Lane Smith	There is a Tribe of Kids	—	Two Hoots
2016	Chris Riddell	The Sleeper and the Spindle	Neil Gaiman	Bloomsbury
2015	William Grill	Shackleton's Journey	—	Flying Eye Books
2014	Jon Klassen	This Is Not My Hat	—	Walker Books
2013	Levi Pinfold	Black Dog	—	Templar
2012	Jim Kay	A Monster Calls	Patrick Ness	Walker Books
2011	Grahame Baker-Smith	FArTHER	—	Templar
2010	Freya Blackwood	Harry and Hopper	Margaret Wild	Scholastic
2009	Catherine Rayner	Harris Finds His Feet	—	Little Tiger
2008	Emily Gravett	Little Mouse's Big Book of Fears	—	Pan Macmillan
2007	Mini Grey	The Adventures of the Dish and the Spoon	—	Jonathan Cape
2006	(The award date is the year of publication before 2006, the year of presentation after 2006.)			
2005	Emily Gravett	Wolves	—	PanMacmillan
2004	Chris Riddell	Jonathan Swift's "Gulliver"	Jonathan Swift (1726) adapted	Walker Books
2003	Shirley Hughes	Ella's Big Chance	— (Cinderella adapted)	Bodley Head
2002	Bob Graham	Jethro Byrde, Fairy Child	—	Walker Books
2001	Chris Riddell	Pirate Diary: The Journal of Jake Carpenter	Richard Platt (informational)	Walker Books
2000	Lauren Child	I Will Never Not Ever Eat a Tomato *	—	Orchard Books
1999	Helen Oxenbury	Alice's Adventures in Wonderland *	Lewis Carroll (1865)	Walker Books
1998	Helen Cooper	Pumpkin Soup	—	Doubleday
1997	P. J. Lynch	When Jessie Came Across the Sea	Amy Hest	Walker Books
1996	Helen Cooper	The Baby Who Wouldn't Go To Bed	—	Doubleday
1995	P. J. Lynch	The Christmas Miracle of Jonathan Toomey	Susan Wojciechowski	Walker Books
1994	Gregory Rogers	Way Home	Libby Hathorn	Andersen
1993	Alan Lee	Black Ships Before Troy	Rosemary Sutcliff	Frances Lincoln
1992	Anthony Browne	Zoo	—	Julia MacRae
1991	Janet Ahlberg	The Jolly Christmas Postman	Allan Ahlberg	Heinemann
1990	Gary Blythe	The Whales' Song	Dyan Sheldon	Hutchinson
1989	Michael Foreman	War Boy: A Country Childhood	— (autobiographical)	Pavilion
1988	Barbara Firth	Can't You Sleep Little Bear?	Martin Waddell	Walker Books
1987	Adrienne Kennaway	Crafty Chameleon	Mwenye Hadithi	Hodder & Stoughton
1986	Fiona French	Snow White in New York	—	Oxford
1985	Juan Wijngaard	Sir Gawain and the Loathly Lady	retold by Selina Hastings	Walker Books
1984	Errol Le Cain	Hiawatha's Childhood	Longfellow (1855)	Faber
1983	Anthony Browne	Gorilla *	—	Julia MacRae
1982	Michael Foreman	Long Neck and Thunder Foot (and); Sleeping Beauty and other favourite fairy tales	Helen Piers (and) traditional	Kestrel; Gollancz
1981	Charles Keeping	The Highwayman *	Alfred Noyes (1906)	Oxford
1980	Quentin Blake	Mr Magnolia *	—	Jonathan Cape
1979	Jan Pieńkowski	Haunted House	—	Heinemann
1978	Janet Ahlberg	Each Peach Pear Plum *	Allan Ahlberg	Kestrel
1977	Shirley Hughes	Dogger *	—	Bodley Head
1976	Gail E. Haley	The Post Office Cat	—	Bodley Head
1975	Victor Ambrus	Horses in Battle (and); Mishka	— (nonfiction) —	Oxford; Oxford
1974	Pat Hutchins	The Wind Blew	— (informational)	Bodley Head
1973	Raymond Briggs	Father Christmas *	—	Hamish Hamilton
1972	Krystyna Turska	The Woodcutter's Duck	—	Hamish Hamilton
1971	Jan Pieńkowski	The Kingdom Under the Sea and other stories	retold by Joan Aiken	Jonathan Cape
1970	John Burningham	Mr Gumpy's Outing	—	Jonathan Cape
1969	Helen Oxenbury	The Quangle Wangle's Hat (and); The Dragon of an Ordinary Family	Edward Lear (unknown); Margaret Mahy (1969)	Heinemann, Franklin Watts; Heinemann
1968	Pauline Baynes	A Dictionary of Chivalry	Grant Uden (reference)	Longman
1967	Charles Keeping	Charley, Charlotte and the Golden Canary	—	Oxford
1966	Raymond Briggs	Mother Goose Treasury	traditional	Hamish Hamilton
1965	Victor Ambrus	The Three Poor Tailors	—	Oxford, Hamish Hamilton
1964	C. Walter Hodges	Shakespeare's Theatre	— (nonfiction)	Oxford
1963	John Burningham	Borka: The Adventures of a Goose With No Feathers *	—	Jonathan Cape
1962	Brian Wildsmith	ABC (also Brian Wildsmith's ABC)	— (no text)	Oxford
1961	Antony Maitland	Mrs Cockle's Cat	Philippa Pearce	Constable,Longman
1960	Gerald Rose	Old Winkle and the Seagulls	Elizabeth Rose	Faber
1959	William Stobbs	Kashtanka (and); A Bundle of Ballads	Anton Chekhov (1887); Ruth Manning-Sanders from the Child Ballads	Oxford; Oxford
1958	(Prize withheld as no book considered suitable)			
1957	V. H. Drummond	Mrs Easter and the Storks	—	Faber
1956	Edward Ardizzone	Tim All Alone *	—	Oxford
1955	(Prize withheld as no book considered suitable)			

* Named to the 50th Anniversary Top Ten in 2007.

== Winners of multiple awards ==
Only one illustrator, Chris Riddell, has won three Medals. Fourteen other illustrators have won two of the 64 Medals awarded through 2021. The first winner of two Medals was John Burningham, 1963 and 1970. The most recent is Sydney Smith in 2018 and 2021.

Only A Monster Calls (Walker Books, 2011), by Patrick Ness and Jim Kay, has won both the Carnegie and Greenaway Medals for writing and illustration (2012).

In 2014, This is Not My Hat by Jon Klassen won both the Greenaway Medal and the American Caldecott Medal, which recognises a picture book illustrated by a U.S. citizen or resident. This is the first time the same book has won both medals. The recently common practice of co-publication makes a double win possible. Indeed, This Is Not My Hat was released in Britain and America on the same day, 9 October 2012, by Walker Books and its American subsidiary Candlewick Press.

Gail E. Haley was the first illustrator to win both medals, albeit for different works: the 1971 Caldecott for A Story a Story (1970) and the 1976 Greenaway for The Post Office Cat. She also wrote both books.

Helen Oxenbury, who won the 1969 and 1999 medals, was also a "Highly Commended" runner-up four times from 1989 to 1994; the distinction was used 31 times in 29 years to 2002 and no other illustrator was highly commended more than twice. Michael Foreman, who won the 1982 and 1989 medals, was highly commended once and four times a "Commended" runner-up, a distinction used 68 times in 44 years to 2002.

Walker Books, based in London, with American subsidiary Candlewick Press in Somerville, MA, has published 10 of the 30 Greenaway Medal-winning works from 1985 to 2014.

== 50-year Greenaway of Greenaways (2007) ==
For the 50th medal anniversary, (Note: The companion Carnegie Medal was inaugurated in 1937 for the 1936 publication year, so its 70th anniversary genuinely underlay the 2007 celebration of both awards; Carnegie history then covered seventy years of children's book publication, 1936–2005. That was also the 50th anniversary of the first Greenaway Medal awarded, but only because no work was judged suitable in the Greenaway's first year; Greenaway history then covered fifty-one publication years, 1955–2005.) CILIP posted online information about all of the winning works (1955–2005) and conducted a poll to identify the nation's favourite Kate Greenaway Medalist. The public were invited to send in their nominations between 16 October and 1 December 2006. Polling was subsequently opened between 20 April and 14 June 2007 for ten shortlisted titles determined by a panel and the winner was announced on 21 June 2007 at the British Library. By less than one percentage point Dogger, illustrated and written by Shirley Hughes (1977), outpolled Each Peach Pear Plum illustrated by Janet Ahlberg and written by Allan Ahlberg (1978).

The nation, and international voters too, considered a ballot or all-time shortlist comprising ten of the 50 Medal-winning works, selected by six "children's book experts". The panel provided annotations including recommended ages that range from 1+ to 10+ years; age 4+ for the winner.

50th Anniversary Top Ten

- Janet Ahlberg, Each Peach Pear Plum (Kestrel, 1978), written by Allan Ahlberg
- Edward Ardizzone, Tim All Alone (Oxford, 1956)
- Quentin Blake, Mr Magnolia (Jonathan Cape, 1980)
- Raymond Briggs, Father Christmas (Hamish Hamilton, 1973)
- Anthony Browne, Gorilla (Julia MacRae, 1983)
- John Burningham, Borka: The Adventures of a Goose With No Feathers (Jonathan Cape, 1963)
- Lauren Child, I Will Never Not Ever Eat a Tomato (Orchard, 2000)
- Shirley Hughes, Dogger (Bodley Head, 1977)
- Charles Keeping, The Highwayman (Oxford, 1981), an edition of the 1906 poem by Alfred Noyes
- Helen Oxenbury, Alice's Adventures in Wonderland (Walker, 1999), an edition of the 1865 novel by Lewis Carroll

== Shortlists and Honorees ==
Headings give the official award dates: years of publication before 2006; years of presentation after 2006.

Prior to the 1990's these listings cover only the Medalist and known Highly Commended (+) or Commended (–) books.

1954 Carnegie Medal

Illustrator Harold Jones received a Special Commendation for the 1954 Carnegie Medal, for his part in Lavender's Blue: A Book of Nursery Rhymes, compiled by Kathleen Lines (Oxford) — a 180-page collection named for "Lavender's Blue", which Oxford University Press has reprinted many times. It was "a major reason" for the Library Association to establish the Kate Greenaway Medal that year. No 1955 work was judged worthy in 1956, so the Greenaway was actually inaugurated one year later, recognising a 1956 publication.

=== 1955 to 1989 ===
1955 (not awarded)

1956 Edward Ardizzone, Tim All Alone (Oxford) @

Ardizzone had inaugurated the Tim series in 1936 with Little Tim and the Brave Sea Captain (Oxford); its last sequel was Ships Cook Ginger (1977). Tim All Alone was named one of the top ten Medal-winning works in 2007.

1957 V. H. Drummond, Mrs Easter and the Storks (Faber) @

1958 (not awarded)

No work was considered suitable, the second and last time.

1959 William Stobbs, Kashtanka (Oxford), by Anton Chekhov (1887) and A Bundle of Ballads (Oxford), by Ruth Manning-Sanders from the Child Ballads (19th century collection)

– Edward Ardizzone, Titus in Trouble (Bodley Head), by James Reeves
– Gerald Rose, Wuffles Goes To Town (Faber), by Elizabeth Rose

The 1959 medal recognised two books, the first of four such occasions to 1982. Two runners-up were "Commended", a new distinction that would be used 99 times in 44 years to 2002, including 31 "Highly Commended" books that were named beginning 1974.

1960 Gerald Rose, Old Winkle and the Seagulls (Faber), by Elizabeth Rose

(no commendations)

1961 Antony Maitland, Mrs Cockle's Cat (Constable; Longman), by Philippa Pearce

(no commendations)

1962 Brian Wildsmith, ABC (Oxford) @

– Carol Barker, Achilles the Donkey (Dobson), by H. E. Bates

ABC was Wildsmith's first book, an alphabet book without any words, commissioned by Mabel George at Oxford.

1963 John Burningham, Borka: The Adventures of a Goose With No Feathers (Jonathan Cape) @

– Victor Ambrus, The Royal Navy (Oxford), by Peter Dawlish
– Victor Ambrus, A Time of Trial (Oxford), by Hester Burton
– Brian Wildsmith, The Lion and the Rat: A Fable (Oxford), by Jean de La Fontaine (1668), from Aesop (6th century BCE)
– Brian Wildsmith, Oxford Book of Poetry for Children (Oxford), ed. Edward Blishen

Borka was Burningham's first book as an author or illustrator and it was named one of the top ten Medal-winning works in 2007.

1964 C. Walter Hodges, Shakespeare's Theatre (Oxford) @ —nonfiction

– Raymond Briggs, Fee Fi Fo Fum (Hamish Hamilton) @
– Victor Ambrus, for work in general
– William Papas, for work in general (Note: Papas was a Commended runner-up for the 1964, 1967, and 1968 Greenaway Medals, recognising the year's best work(s) of illustration for children. CCSU lists no single book commended for 1964 (rather, Papas commended "for work in general"); two for 1967 (The Church and No Mules); three for 1968 (A Letter from India, A Letter from Israel, and Taresh the tea planter). Those five books were all published by Oxford University Press. It is unknown whether any of them were individually considered for the Medal and commended as runners-up. At that time, as near as Helen Oxenbury in 1969, the Medal was sometimes conferred upon an illustrator for multiple named books. · "Kate Greenaway Medal". 2007(?). Curriculum Lab. Elihu Burritt Library. Central Connecticut State University (CCSU). Retrieved 2012-06-25. · "Kate Greenaway Medal: Full List of Winners". CILIP Carnegie & Kate Greenaway Children's Book Awards. CILIP. Retrieved 2012-06-25.)

Hodges was a freelance illustrator, a lover of theatre, and an authority on theatre construction in Shakespeare's time. Shakespeare's Theatre was the first nonfiction book cited for the medal.

Ambrus and Papas received the first and only commendations for "work in general".

1965 Victor Ambrus, The Three Poor Tailors (Oxford; Hamish Hamilton) @

(no commendations)

The Three Poor Tailors was the first-published book written by Ambrus, who had illustrated dozens of fiction and nonfiction books for Oxford since immigrating from Hungary via Austria.

1966 Raymond Briggs, Mother Goose Treasury (Hamish Hamilton), traditional

– Doreen Roberts, The Story of Saul the King (Constable; Oxford), abridged from Helen Waddell, Stories from Holy Writ (1949)

1967 Charles Keeping, Charley, Charlotte and the Golden Canary (Oxford) @

– William Papas, The Church (Oxford), by Geoffrey Moorhouse
– William Papas, No Mules (Oxford) @
– Brian Wildsmith, Birds (Oxford) @

1968 Pauline Baynes, A Dictionary of Chivalry (Longman), by Grant Uden —reference

– Gaynor Chapman, The Luck Child: Based on a story of the Brothers Grimm (Hamish Hamilton), based on Brothers Grimm
– Shirley Hughes, Flutes and Cymbals: Poetry for the Young (Bodley Head), compiled by Leonard Clark
– William Papas, A Letter from India (Oxford) @ —information book
– William Papas, A Letter from Israel (Oxford) @ —information book
– William Papas, Taresh the tea planter (Oxford) @

Baynes alone has won the medal for illustrating a reference book; only a few nonfiction or fictionalised information books have been cited.

The distinguished runners-up (–) were called "Honours" rather than "Commended" for 1968, 1969, and perhaps 1970.

1969 Helen Oxenbury, The Quangle Wangle's Hat (Heinemann; Franklin Watts), by Edward Lear (late 19th century) and The Dragon of an Ordinary Family (Heinemann), by Margaret Mahy

– Errol Le Cain, The Cabbage Princess (Faber) @
– Charles Keeping, Joseph's Yard (Longman) @

The distinguished runners-up (–) were called "Honours" again.

1970 John Burningham, Mr Gumpy's Outing (Jonathan Cape) @

– Charles Keeping, The God Beneath the Sea (Longman), by Leon Garfield and Edward Blishen
– Jan Pieńkowski, The Golden Bird (J. M. Dent), by Edith Brill
– Krystyna Turska, Pegasus (Hamish Hamilton), the myth of Pegasus and Bellerophon retold by Turska

Burningham became the first to win two medals, 1963 and 1970, one year after his wife Helen Oxenbury won her first of two. As of 2012 fourteen illustrators have won two Greenaways, none three.

Garfield and Blishen won the companion Carnegie Medal for The God Beneath the Sea. (For more than fifty years until 2012, no single book won both of the CILIP awards.)

1971 Jan Pieńkowski, The Kingdom under the Sea and other stories (Jonathan Cape), retold by Joan Aiken

– Victor Ambrus, The Sultan's Bath (Oxford) @
– Brian Wildsmith, The Owl and the Woodpecker (Oxford) @

(One source calls these two runners-up "Highly Commended". They would be the first.)

1972 Krystyna Turska, The Woodcutter's Duck (Hamish Hamilton) @

– Carol Barker, King Midas and the Golden Touch (Franklin Watts), a version of the Midas myth
– Pauline Baynes, Snail and Caterpillar (Longman), by Helen Piers
– Antony Maitland, The Ghost Downstairs (Longman), by Leon Garfield

1973 Raymond Briggs, Father Christmas (Hamish Hamilton) @

– Fiona French, King Tree (Oxford) @
– Errol Lloyd, My Brother Sean (Bodley Head), by Petronella Breinburg

Briggs introduced the grumpy old man with a challenging, lonely job, to be continued in Father Christmas Goes on Holiday ( ). Father Christmas was named one of the top ten Medal-winning works in 2007.

1974 Pat Hutchins, The Wind Blew (Bodley Head) @

– Mitsumasa Anno, Anno's Alphabet (Bodley Head) @
+ Charles Keeping, Railway Passage (Oxford) @

The Wind Blew has been called informative, meteorological poetry.

(According to answers.com citing Gale Biographies, Anno's Alphabet was ineligible for the medal, with its Japanese author and original publisher.)

1975 Victor Ambrus, Horses in Battle (Oxford) @ and Mishka (Oxford) @

– Shirley Hughes, Helpers (Bodley Head) @
– Errol Le Cain, Thorn Rose, or the Sleeping Beauty (Faber), from Brothers Grimm

Ambrus won his second medal. Horses in Battle, nonfiction or fictionalised history, is the latest "information book" to be cited except for one, Pirate Diary (2001).

1976 Gail E. Haley, The Post Office Cat (Bodley Head) @

+ Graham Oakley, The Church Mice Adrift (Macmillan) @ —fifth of 12 Church Mice books
+ Maureen Roffey, Tinker, Tailor, Soldier, Sailor (Bodley Head), by Bernard Lodge
+ Joanna Troughton, How the Birds Changed Their Feathers (Blackie, Folk Tales of the World), retold and illustrated by Troughton @

Haley had won the 1971 Caldecott Medal (U.S.) and moved to the U.K. in 1973. No one else has won both medals, which CILIP rules and co-publication enable in the 21st century.

1977 Shirley Hughes, Dogger (Bodley Head) @

– Janet Ahlberg, Burglar Bill (Heinemann), by Allan Ahlberg
– Mary Rayner, Garth Pig and the Ice Cream Lady (Macmillan) @

Dogger was named one of the top ten Medal-winning works in 2007, and was voted the public favourite from that slate.

1978 Janet Ahlberg, Each Peach Pear Plum (Kestrel), by Allan Ahlberg

+ Raymond Briggs, The Snowman (Hamish Hamilton) @ —no text
– Michael Foreman, Popular Folk Tales (Gollancz), newly translated from Brothers Grimm by Brian Alderson
– Errol Le Cain, The Twelve Dancing Princesses (Faber), retold from Brothers Grimm by Le Cain

Each Peach Pear Plum was named one of the top ten Medal-winning works in 2007, and finished a close second in public voting on that slate.

1979 Jan Pieńkowski, The Haunted House (Heinemann) @

+ Quentin Blake, The Wild Washerwomen: A new folk tale, by John Yeoman
– Pat Hutchins, One-Eyed Jack ( ) @

Pieńkowski won his second medal.

1980 Quentin Blake, Mr Magnolia (Jonathan Cape) @

– Beryl Cook, Seven Years and a Day (Collins), by Colette O'Hare
+ Michael Foreman, City of Gold and other stories from the Old Testament (Gollancz), retold by Peter Dickinson
– Jill Murphy, Peace at Last ( ) @

Mister Magnolia was named one of the top ten Medal-winning works in 2007.

Dickinson won the companion Carnegie Medal for City of Gold. (For more than fifty years until 2012, no single book won both of the CILIP awards.)

1981 Charles Keeping, The Highwayman (Oxford), an edition of the 1906 poem by Alfred Noyes

– Nicola Bayley, The Patchwork Cat (Jonathan Cape), by William Mayne
+ Jan Ormerod, Sunshine (Kestrel) @

Keeping won his second medal. The Highwayman was named one of the top ten Medal-winning works in 2007.

1982 Michael Foreman, Long Neck and Thunder Foot (Kestrel), by Helen Piers and Sleeping Beauty and other favourite fairy tales (Gollancz), selected and translated by Angela Carter

– Janet Ahlberg, The Baby's Catalogue ( ), by Allan Ahlberg
+ Graham Oakley, The Church Mice in Action (Macmillan) @ —eighth of twelve Church Mice books

The 1982 medal recognised two books, the last of four times from 1959. Sleeping Beauty also won the inaugural Kurt Maschler Award for children's book "text and illustration ... integrated so that each enhances and balances the other."

Oakley and the Church Mice series were highly commended for the second time, the first double recognition for a series (books five and eight). Subsequently, Janet Ahlberg (Jolly Postman series) and Chris Riddell (Diary series) were runners-up for the first books and medalists for the sequels.

1983 Anthony Browne, Gorilla (Julia MacRae) @

– Molly Bang, Ten, Nine, Eight ( ) @ —a counting book
– Michael Foreman, The Saga of Erik the Viking (Pavilion), by Terry Jones
– Ron Maris, My Book (Julia MacRae) @

Gorilla was named one of the top ten Medal-winning works in 2007. It also won the annual Kurt Maschler Award for integrated text and illustration.

Ten, Nine, Eight was also a runner-up for the U.S. Caldecott Medal ("Honour Book").

1984 Errol Le Cain, Hiawatha's Childhood (Faber), a section of the 1855 poem by Longfellow

(no commendations)

1985 Juan Wijngaard, Sir Gawain and the Loathly Lady (Walker), retold by Selina Hastings

– Michael Foreman, Seasons of Splendour: Tales, myths, and legends of India (Pavilion), by Madhur Jaffrey
– Gillian McClure, Tog the Ribber, or, Granny's Tale (Andre Deutsch), poem by Paul Coltman

1986 Fiona French, Snow White in New York (Oxford) @

– Janet Ahlberg, The Jolly Postman (Heinemann), by Allan Ahlberg
– Paddy Bouma, Are We Nearly There? (Bodley Head), by Louis Baum
– Babette Cole, Princess Smartypants ( ) @
+ Jan Ormerod, Happy Christmas, Gemma (Walker), by Sarah Hayes
– Fiona Pragoff, How Many?: From 0 to 20 (Gollancz) @
– Tony Ross, I Want My Potty ( ) @ —the first Little Princess book

The Ahlbergs won the Emils for The Jolly Postman (Kurt Maschler Award).

1987 Adrienne Kennaway, Crafty Chameleon (Hodder & Stoughton), by Mwenye Hadithi

– Babette Cole, Prince Cinders ( ) @
– Errol Le Cain, The Enchanter's Daughter (Jonathan Cape), by Antonia Barber
– Jill Murphy, All in One Piece ( ) @

1988 Barbara Firth, Can't You Sleep Little Bear? (Walker), by Martin Waddell

– Ruth Brown, Ladybird, Ladybird (Andersen), a traditional rhyme
+ Anthony Browne, Alice's Adventures in Wonderland, an edition of the 1865 classic by Lewis Carroll
– Penny Dale, Wake Up Mr. B! (Walker) @
+ Roberto Innocenti, The Adventures of Pinocchio (Creative Education), an edition of the 1883 classic by Carlo Collodi
+ Alan Lee, Merlin Dreams, by Peter Dickinson

Browne won an Emil for this edition of Alice (Kurt Maschler Award).

Special 1988 commendation: David Burnie, Bird (Dorling Kindersley, in association with the National History Museum)

1989 Michael Foreman, War Boy: a Country Childhood (Pavilion) @ —autobiographical

+ Helen Oxenbury, We're Going on a Bear Hunt (Walker), retold by Michael Rosen

Foreman won his second medal. Oxenbury was highly commended for the first of four times.

=== 1990s ===
In 1991 Janet Ahlberg won her second medal, both for books that were husband-and-wife collaborations. The Jolly Christmas Postman was the second of three interactive Jolly Postman books; the last would be published posthumously. Janet Ahlberg is one of three people to be commended for the Greenaway Medal, at least, for two books in a series.

1992 saw Anthony Browne win his second medal, on this occasion for Zoo written by Julia MacRae.

In 1993 Michael Foreman was a distinguished runner-up for the fifth time (once highly commended).

In 1994 Helen Oxenbury was the lone "Highly Commended" runner-up for the fourth time in six years. The distinction would be used 31 times in 29 years to 2002. Oxenbury and author Trish Cooke would also win the Emils (Kurt Maschler Award) for So Much.

In 1995 Patrick Benson and author Kathy Henderson won the Emils (Kurt Maschler Award) for The Little Boat.

1997, 1998 and 1999 marked second medal wins for three different illustrators. In 1997 P. J. Lynch won for the second time with When Jessie Came Across the Sea, and in 1998 Helen Cooper did the same with Pumpkin Soup. The final year of the decade saw Helen Oxenbury win her second Greenaway Medal for Alice's Adventures in Wonderland, which would go onto be named one of the top ten Medal-winning works in 2007. Oxenbury also won her second Emil (Kurt Maschler Award), which were subsequently discontinued having run from 1982 to 1999.

Colour key:

– Medal Winner
– Highly commended
– Commended

Medal winners, Commendations and Shortlists, 1990-1999
Year	Illustrator	Title	Publisher	Author (if different)	Result	Ref.
1990	Gary Blythe	The Whales' Song	Hutchinson	Dyan Sheldon	Winner	
1990	Tony Ross	Dr Xargle's Book of Earth Tiggers	Andersen Press	Jeanne Willis	Highly commended	
1990	Nicola Bayley	The Mousehole Cat	Walker Books	Antonia Barber	Commended	
1990	Roberto Innocenti	A Christmas Carol	Creative Education	an edition of the 1843 classic by Charles Dickens	Commended	
1990	Penny Dale	Rosie's Babies	Walker Books	Martin Waddell	Shortlist	
1990	Kim Lewis	The Shepherd Boy	Walker Books	—	Shortlist	
1990	Jane Ray	Noah's Ark	Orchard Books	—	Shortlist	
1991	Janet Ahlberg	The Jolly Christmas Postman	Heinemann	Allan Ahlberg	Winner	
1991	Helen Oxenbury	Farmer Duck	Walker Books	Martin Waddell	Highly commended	
1991	Caroline Binch	Amazing Grace	Dial	Mary Hoffman	Commended	
1991	Jeannie Baker	Window	Julia MacRae	— (no text)	Shortlist	
1991	Fiona French	Anancy and Mr Dry-Bone	Frances Lincoln	—	Shortlist	
1991	P. J. Lynch	East o' the Sun and West o' the Moon	Walker Books	translated by George W. Dasent	Shortlist	
1991	Jane Ray	The Story of Christmas	Orchard Books	—	Shortlist	
1992	Anthony Browne	Zoo	Julia MacRae	—	Winner	
1992	Jill Barton	The Pig in the Pond	Walker Books	Martin Waddell	Highly commended	
1992	Caroline Binch	Hue Boy	Dial	Rita Phillips Mitchell	Highly commended	
1992	Stephen Biesty	Incredible Cross-Sections	Dorling Kindersley	Richard Platt	Shortlist	
1992	Robert Ingpen	Treasure Island	Dragon's World	an edition of the 1883 classic by Robert Louis Stevenson	Shortlist	
1992	Francesca Martin	The Honey Hunters	Walker Books	—	Shortlist	
1992	Korky Paul	The Dog That Dug	Bodley Head	Jonathan Long	Shortlist	
1993	Alan Lee	Black Ships Before Troy	Frances Lincoln	Rosemary Sutcliff	Winner	
1993	Helen Oxenbury	The Three Little Wolves and the Big Bad Pig	Heinemann Young Books	Eugene Trivizas	Highly commended	
1993	Michael Foreman	War Game	Pavilion	—	Commended	
1993	Angela Barrett	Beware Beware	Walker Books	Susan Hill	Shortlist	
1993	Gary Blythe	The Garden	Hutchinson	Dyan Sheldon	Shortlist	
1993	Helen Cooper	The Bear Under the Stairs	Doubleday	—	Shortlist	
1993	Jill Murphy	A Quiet Night In	Walker Books	—	Shortlist	
1994	Gregory Rogers	Way Home	Andersen Press	Libby Hathorn	Winner	
1994	Helen Oxenbury	So Much	Walker Books	Trish Cooke	Highly commended	
1994	Chris Riddell	Something Else	Puffin	Kathryn Cave	Commended	
1994	Caroline Binch	Gregory Cool	Frances Lincoln	—	Shortlist	
1994	Anthony Browne	King Kong	Julia MacRae	from the 1932 novelised story of King Kong	Shortlist	
1994	Paul Geraghty	The Hunter	Hutchinson	—	Shortlist	
1994	P. J. Lynch	Catkin	Walker Books	Antonia Barber	Shortlist	
1994	Jane Ray	The Happy Prince	Orchard Books	from the fairy tale by Oscar Wilde	Shortlist	
1995	P. J. Lynch	The Christmas Miracle of Jonathan Toomey	Walker Books	Susan Wojciechowski	Winner	
1995	Patrick Benson	The Little Boat	Walker Books	Kathy Henderson	Highly commended	
1995	Quentin Blake	Clown	Jonathan Cape	—	Commended	
1995	Christina Balit	Blodin the Beast	Frances Lincoln	Michael Morpurgo	Shortlist	
1995	Ken Brown	Tattybogle	Andersen Press	Sandra Horn	Shortlist	
1995	Mick Inkpen	Nothing	Hodder	—	Shortlist	
1995	Colin McNaughton	Here Come the Aliens	Walker Books	—	Shortlist	
1996	Helen Cooper	The Baby Who Wouldn't Go To Bed	Doubleday	—	Winner	
1996	Caroline Binch	Down by the River	Heinemann	Grace Hallworth	Highly commended	
1996	Christina Balit	Ishtar and Tammuz: A Babylonian myth of the seasons	Frances Lincoln	retold by Christopher Moore	Commended	
1996	Ruth Brown	The Tale of the Monstrous Toad	Andersen Press	—	Shortlist	
1996	Susan Field	The Smallest Whale	Orchard Books	Elisabeth Beresford	Shortlist	
1996	Debi Gliori	Mr Bear to the Rescue	Orchard Books	—	Shortlist	
1996	Colin McNaughton	Oops!	Andersen Press	—	Shortlist	
1996	Korky Paul	The Duck That Had No Luck	Bodley Head	Jonathan Long	Shortlist	
1997	P. J. Lynch	When Jessie Came Across the Sea	Walker Books	Amy Hest	Winner	
1997	Bob Graham	Queenie the Bantam	Walker Books	—	Highly commended	
1997	Charlotte Voake	Ginger	Walker Books	—	Highly commended	
1997	Ken Brown	Mucky Pup	Andersen Press	—	Shortlist	
1997	Anthony Browne	Willy the Dreamer	Walker Books	—	Shortlist	
1997	Peter Collington	A Small Miracle	Jonathan Cape	— (no text)	Shortlist	
1997	Clare Mackie	Book of Nonsense	Macdonald Young Books	Michael Rosen	Shortlist	
1997	Sophie Windham	Unicorns! Unicorns!	Hutchinson	Geraldine McCaughrean	Shortlist	
1998	Helen Cooper	Pumpkin Soup	Doubleday	—	Winner	
1998	Shirley Hughes	The Lion and the Unicorn	Bodley Head	—	Highly commended	
1998	Jane Simmons	Come on Daisy!	Orchard Books	—	Highly commended	
1998	Christian Birmingham	The Lion, the Witch and the Wardrobe	HarperCollins	an edition of the 1950 classic by C. S. Lewis	Shortlist	
1998	Quentin Blake	Zagazoo	Jonathan Cape	—	Shortlist	
1998	Anthony Browne	Voices in the Park	Doubleday	—	Shortlist	
1998	Emma Chichester Clark	I Love You, Blue Kangaroo	Andersen Press	—	Shortlist	
1999	Helen Oxenbury	Alice's Adventures in Wonderland	Walker Books	an edition of the 1865 classic by Lewis Carroll	Winner	
1999	Lauren Child	Clarice Bean, That's Me!	Orchard Books	—	Highly commended	
1999	Chris Riddell	Castle Diary: The Journal of Tobias Burgess, Page	Walker Books	Richard Platt	Highly commended	
1999	Kevin Hawkes	Weslandia	Walker Books	Paul Fleischman	Commended	
1999	Patrick Benson	The Sea-Thing Child	Walker Books	Russell Hoban	Shortlist	
1999	Christian Birmingham	Wombat Goes Walkabout	HarperCollins	Michael Morpurgo	Shortlist	
1999	Kathy Henderson	The Storm	Walker Books	—	Shortlist	
1999	Simon James	Days Like This	Walker Books	—	Shortlist	

=== 2000s ===
Thanks to a bequest left in 2000 by children's book and illustration collector, Colin Mears, the winner now receives a cheque for £5000 along with the Greenaway Medal.

The winning book in the year 2000, I Will Never Not Ever Eat a Tomato was named one of the top ten Medal-winning works in 2007, and ranked third in public voting from that slate.

In 2001, Pirate Diary became the latest "information book" to be cited for the medal and the first since 1975. It was the second in a series of four first-person journals, inaugurated by Richard Platt and Chris Riddell in 1999 (Castle Diary) and continued by Platt with another illustrator. Riddell was the third and latest illustrator to be at least commended for the Greenaway for books in a series, following Graham Oakley (Church Mice, 1976 and 1982) and Janet Ahlberg (Jolly Postman, 1986 and 1991).

2002 saw Bob Graham become the first medalist from Australia. Lauren Child was the last "Commended" or "Highly Commended" runner-up; there had been 99 such distinctions over 44 years.

Twenty-six years after her first medal, 2003 marked a second win for Shirley Hughes and Ella's Big Chance —a retelling of Cinderella. Commendations ceased to be awarded in this year. Since 2003 there have usually been eight books on the shortlist.

In 2004, Chris Riddell was awarded his second medal, this time for Jonathan Swift's "Gulliver". In this year there were only 7 shortlisted books.

Wolves by Emily Gravett in its U.S. edition was Gravett's first book as author or illustrator, just one year out of college. She won the 49th Greenaway Medal, awarded in its 51st year (2005). Three years later in 2008, when once again there were only 7 shortlisted nominations, Emily Gravett won her second medal for her fourth book, with the cover title Little Mouse's ~~Emily Gravett's~~ Big Book of Fears.

Colour key:

– Medal Winner
– Highly commended
– Commended

Medal winners, Commendations and Shortlists, 2000-2009
Year	Illustrator	Title	Publisher	Author (if different)	Result	Ref.
2000	Lauren Child	I Will Never Not Ever Eat a Tomato	Orchard Books	—	Winner	
2000	Anthony Browne	Willy's Pictures		—	Highly commended	
2000	Ted Dewan	Crispin: The Pig Who Had It All	Transworld	—	Commended	
2000	Ruth Brown	Snail Trail		—	Shortlist	
2000	Lauren Child	Beware of the Storybook Wolves	Hodder Children's Books	—	Shortlist	
2000	Jane Ray	Fairy Tales	Walker Books	Berlie Doherty	Shortlist	
2001	Chris Riddell	Pirate Diary: The Journal of Jake Carpenter	Walker Books	Richard Platt	Winner	
2001	Jez Alborough	Fix-it Duck	Picture Lions	—	Highly commended	
2001	Charles Fuge	Sometimes I Like to Curl Up in a Ball	Gullane	Vicki Churchill	Highly commended	
2001	Russell Ayto	The Witch's Children	Orchard Books	Ursula Jones	Shortlist	
2001	Nicola Bayley	Katje the Windmill Cat	Walker Books	Gretchen Woelfle	Shortlist	
2001	Caroline Binch	Silver Shoes	Dorling Kindersley	—	Shortlist	
2001	Helen Cooper	Tatty Ratty	Doubleday	—	Shortlist	
2001	Bob Graham	Let's Get a Pup!	Walker Books	—	Shortlist	
2002	Bob Graham	Jethro Byrde, Fairy Child	Walker Books	—	Winner	
2002	Lauren Child	That Pesky Rat	Orchard Books	—	Commended	
2002	Simon Bartram	Man on the Moon	Templar	—	Shortlist	
2002	Nick Butterworth	Albert le Blanc	Collins	—	Shortlist	
2002	Lauren Child	Who's Afraid of the Big Bad Book?	Hodder	—	Shortlist	
2002	David Melling	The Kiss That Missed	Hodder	—	Shortlist	
2002	Nick Sharratt	Pants	David Fickling Books	Giles Andrae	Shortlist	
2002	Helen Ward	The Cockerel and the Fox	Templar	—a retelling of Chanticleer and the Fox	Shortlist	
2003	Shirley Hughes	Ella's Big Chance	Bodley Head	—a retelling of Cinderella	Winner	
2003	Anthony Browne	The Shape Game	Doubleday	—	Shortlist	
2003	Alexis Deacon	Beegu	Hutchinson	—	Shortlist	
2003	Debi Gliori	Always and Forever	Doubleday	Alan Durant	Shortlist	
2003	Mini Grey	The Pea and the Princess	Red Fox	—a retelling of "The Princess and the Pea"	Shortlist	
2003	Dave McKean	The Wolves in the Walls	Bloomsbury	Neil Gaiman	Shortlist	
2003	Bee Willey	Bob Robber and Dancing Jane	Jonathan Cape	Andrew Matthews	Shortlist	
2003	Chris Wormell	Two Frogs	Red Fox; Jonathan Cape	—	Shortlist	
2004	Chris Riddell	Jonathan Swift's "Gulliver"	Walker Books	the 1726 classic Gulliver's Travels adapted by Martin Jenkins	Winner	
2004	Ian Andrew	The Boat	Templar	Helen Ward	Shortlist	
2004	Russell Ayto	One More Sheep	Hodder	Mij Kelly	Shortlist	
2004	Simon Bartram	Dougal's Deep-Sea Diary	Templar	—	Shortlist	
2004	Quentin Blake	Michael Rosen's Sad Book	Walker Books	Michael Rosen	Shortlist	
2004	Nick Butterworth	The Whisperer	HarperCollins	—	Shortlist	
2004	John Kelly	Guess Who's Coming For Dinner?	Templar	Cathy Tincknell	Shortlist	
2005	Emily Gravett	Wolves	Pan Macmillan	—	Winner	
2005	Tony DiTerlizzi	Arthur Spiderwick's Field Guide to the Fantastical World Around You	Simon & Schuster	Holly Black	Shortlist	
2005	Mini Grey	Traction Man is Here	Red Fox	—	Shortlist	
2005	Oliver Jeffers	Lost and Found	HarperCollins	—	Shortlist	
2005	Dave McKean	Mirrormask	Bloomsbury	Neil Gaiman	Shortlist	
2005	Jane Ray	Jinnie Ghost	Frances Lincoln	Berlie Doherty	Shortlist	
2005	David Roberts	Little Red: A Fizzingly Good Yarn	Abrams Books	Lynn Roberts	Shortlist	
2005	Rob Scotton	Russell the Sheep	HarperCollins	—	Shortlist	
2006	After 2006 the awards year was adjusted. Before 2007 the year refers to when the book was published rather than when the medal was awarded i.e. the 2005 winner was announced and the medal presented in July 2006.					
2007	Mini Grey	The Adventures of the Dish and the Spoon	Jonathan Cape	—	Winner	
2007	Ross Collins	The Elephantom	Templar	—	Shortlist	
2007	Emily Gravett	Orange Pear Apple Bear	Pan Macmillan	— (four words only)	Shortlist	
2007	John Kelly and Cathy Tincknell	Scoop! An Exclusive by Monty Molenski	Templar	—	Shortlist	
2007	Catherine Rayner	Augustus and His Smile	Little Tiger	—	Shortlist	
2007	Chris Riddell	The Emperor of Absurdia	Pan Macmillan	—	Shortlist	
2008	Emily Gravett	Little Mouse's Big Book of Fears	Pan Macmillan	—	Winner	
2008	Anthony Browne	Silly Billy	Walker Books	—	Shortlist	
2008	Polly Dunbar	Penguin	Walker Books	—	Shortlist	
2008	Emily Gravett	Monkey and Me	Pan Macmillan	—	Shortlist	
2008	Jane Ray	The Lost Happy Endings	Bloomsbury	Carol Ann Duffy	Shortlist	
2008	Chris Riddell	Ottoline and the Yellow Cat	Pan Macmillan	—	Shortlist	
2008	Ed Vere	Banana!	Puffin Books	—	Shortlist	
2009	Catherine Rayner	Harris Finds His Feet	Little Tiger	—	Winner	
2009	Angela Barrett	The Snow Goose	Hutchinson	an edition of the 1941 novella by Paul Gallico	Shortlist	
2009	Marc Craste	Varmints	Templar	Helen Ward	Shortlist	
2009	Thomas Docherty	Little Boat	Templar	—	Shortlist	
2009	Bob Graham	How to Heal a Broken Wing	Walker Books	—	Shortlist	
2009	Oliver Jeffers	The Way Back Home	HarperCollins	—	Shortlist	
2009	Dave McKean	The Savage	Walker Books	David Almond	Shortlist	
2009	Chris Wormell	Molly and the Night Monster	Jonathan Cape	—	Shortlist	

=== 2010s ===
In 2012, Jim Kay and Patrick Ness won both the Greenaway and Carnegie Medals for A Monster Calls, the first such double. Prior to this, two illustrators of Carnegie Medal-winning books had been runners-up for the Greenaway, namely Charles Keeping (The God Beneath the Sea, 1970) and Michael Foreman (City of Gold, 1980).

2014 marked the first time that the same book had won both the Greenaway and Caldecott medals, having won the latter in 2013. The winner, Jon Klassen, the first Greenaway medalist from Canada, was shortlisted for two separate publications. In this year the shortlist comprised only seven nominations as opposed to the usual eight.

In 2016, Chris Riddell became the first triple medalist in the history of the award, having previously won in 2001 and 2004.

From 2016 to 2018 an additional award, The Amnesty CLIP Honour, was bestowed upon a shortlisted entry in conjunction with Amnesty International for "books that most distinctively illuminate, uphold or celebrate freedoms". In 2016 There's a Bear on My Chair received the inaugural honour and in 2017 the winner was The Journey, illustrated and written by Italian artist Francesca Sanna, which followed a family of refugees. In 2018, Levi Penfold received the honour for his black and white illustrations in The Song from Somewhere Else.

In 2018 there were only seven shortlisted nominees as opposed to the usual eight. The winner, Sydney Smith would go on to win again in 2021.

In 2019 the Amnesty CLIP Honour was replaced by the Shadowers' Choice Award, voted for and awarded by children and young people who shadow the Medals.

Colour key:

– Medal Winner
– Amnesty CLIP Honour (2016–2018) and Shadowers' Choice Award (2019–) winner if different from Medal winner

Medal winners and Shortlists, 2010-2019
Year	Illustrator	Title	Publisher	Author (if different)	Result	Ref.
2010	Freya Blackwood	Harry and Hopper	Scholastic	Margaret Wild	Winner	
2010	Grahame Baker-Smith	Leon and the Place Between	Templar	Angela McAllister	Shortlist	
2010	Oliver Jeffers	The Great Paper Caper	HarperCollins	—	Shortlist	
2010	Satoshi Kitamura	Millie's Marvellous Hat	Andersen	—	Shortlist	
2010	Dave McKean	Crazy Hair	Bloomsbury	Neil Gaiman	Shortlist	
2010	Chris Riddell	The Graveyard Book	Bloomsbury	Neil Gaiman	Shortlist	
2010	David Roberts	The Dunderheads	Walker Books	Paul Fleischman	Shortlist	
2010	Viviane Schwarz	There Are Cats in This Book	Walker Books	—	Shortlist	
2011	Grahame Baker-Smith	FArTHER	Templar	—	Winner	
2011	Anthony Browne	Me and You	Doubleday	—	Shortlist	
2011	Bob Graham	April Underhill Tooth Fairy	Walker Books	—	Shortlist	
2011	Mini Grey	Jim	Jonathan Cape	Hilaire Belloc, 1907	Shortlist	
2011	Oliver Jeffers	The Heart and the Bottle	HarperCollins	—	Shortlist	
2011	Kristin Oftedal	Big Bear, Little Brother	Pan Macmillan	Carl Norac	Shortlist	
2011	Catherine Rayner	Ernest	Pan Macmillan	—	Shortlist	
2011	Juan Wijngaard	Cloud Tea Monkeys	Walker Books	Mal Peet and Elspeth Graham	Shortlist	
2012	Jim Kay	A Monster Calls	Walker Books	Patrick Ness	Winner	
2012	Emily Gravett	Wolf Won't Bite!	Pan Macmillan	—	Shortlist	
2012	Petr Horáček	Puffin Peter	Walker Books	—	Shortlist	
2012	Dave McKean	Slog's Dad	Walker Books	David Almond	Shortlist	
2012	Catherine Rayner	Solomon Crocodile	Pan Macmillan	—	Shortlist	
2012	Rob Ryan	The Gift	Barefoot Books	Carol Ann Duffy	Shortlist	
2012	Viviane Schwarz	There Are No Cats in This Book	Walker Books	—	Shortlist	
2012	Vicky White	Can We Save the Tiger? (nonfiction)	Walker Books	Martin Jenkins	Shortlist	
2013	Levi Pinfold	Black Dog	Templar	—	Winner	
2013	Rebecca Cobb	Lunchtime	Pan Macmillan	—	Shortlist	
2013	Emily Gravett	Again!	Pan Macmillan	—	Shortlist	
2013	Chris Haughton	Oh No, George!	Walker Books	—	Shortlist	
2013	Jon Klassen	I Want My Hat Back	Walker Books	—	Shortlist	
2013	Chris Mould	Pirates 'n' Pistols	Hodder	—	Shortlist	
2013	Helen Oxenbury	King Jack and the Dragon	Puffin Books	Peter Bently	Shortlist	
2013	Salvatore Rubbino	Just Ducks!	Walker Books	Nicola Davies	Shortlist	
2014	Jon Klassen	This is Not My Hat	Walker Books	—	Winner	
2014	Rebecca Cobb	The Paper Dolls	Pan Macmillan	Julia Donaldson	Shortlist	
2014	Olivia Gill	Where My Wellies Take Me	Templar	Michael Morpurgo and Clare Morpurgo	Shortlist	
2014	Oliver Jeffers	The Day the Crayons Quit	HarperCollins	Drew Daywalt	Shortlist	
2014	Jon Klassen	The Dark	Orchard Books	Lemony Snicket	Shortlist	
2014	Dave McKean	Mouse Bird Snake Wolf	Walker Books	David Almond	Shortlist	
2014	Birgitta Sif	Oliver	Walker Books	—	Shortlist	
2015	William Grill	Shackleton's Journey	Flying Eye Books	—	Winner	
2015	Laura Carlin	The Promise	Walker Books	Nicola Davies	Shortlist	
2015	Alexis Deacon	Jim's Lion	Walker Books	Russell Hoban	Shortlist	
2015	John Higgins and Marc Olivent	Dark Satanic Mills	Walker Books	Marcus Sedgwick and Julian Sedgwick	Shortlist	
2015	Catherine Rayner	Smelly Louie	Pan Macmillan	—	Shortlist	
2015	Chris Riddell	Goth Girl and the Ghost of a Mouse	Pan Macmillan	—	Shortlist	
2015	David Roberts	Tinder	Orion Books	Sally Gardner	Shortlist	
2015	Shaun Tan	Rules of Summer	Lothian Publishing	—	Shortlist	
2016	Chris Riddell	The Sleeper and the Spindle	Bloomsbury	Neil Gaiman	Winner	
2016	Ross Collins	There's a Bear on My Chair	Nosy Crow	—	Shortlist and Amnesty CILIP Honoree	
2016	Anthony Browne	Willy's Stories	Walker Books	—	Shortlist	
2016	Oliver Jeffers	Once Upon an Alphabet	HarperCollins	—	Shortlist	
2016	Jon Klassen	Sam & Dave Dig a Hole	Walker Books	Mac Barnett	Shortlist	
2016	Jackie Morris	Something About a Bear	Frances Lincoln	—	Shortlist	
2016	Helen Oxenbury	Captain Jack and the Pirates	Puffin Books	Peter Bently	Shortlist	
2016	Sydney Smith	Footpath Flowers	Walker Books	JonArno Lawson	Shortlist	
2017	Lane Smith	There is a Tribe of Kids	Two Hoots	—	Winner	
2017	Francesca Sanna	The Journey	Flying Eye Books	—	Shortlist and Amnesty CILIP Honoree	
2017	Dieter Braun	Wild Animals of the North	Flying Eye Books	—	Shortlist	
2017	Emily Gravett	Tidy	Two Hoots	—	Shortlist	
2017	William Grill	The Wolves of Currumpaw	Flying Eye Books	—	Shortlist	
2017	Jim Kay	Harry Potter and the Philosopher's Stone	Bloomsbury	J. K. Rowling	Shortlist	
2017	Chris Riddell	A Great Big Cuddle	Walker Books	Michael Rosen	Shortlist	
2017	Brian Selznick	The Marvels	Scholastic	—	Shortlist	
2018	Sydney Smith	Town is by the Sea	Walker Books	Joanne Schwartz	Winner	
2018	Levi Pinfold	The Song from Somewhere Else	Bloomsbury	A.F. Harrold	Shortlist and Amnesty CILIP Honoree	
2018	Laura Carlin	King of the Sky	Walker Books	Nicola Davies	Shortlist	
2018	Debi Gliori	Night Shift	Hot Key Books	—	Shortlist	
2018	Petr Horáček	A First Book of Animals	Walker Books	Nicola Davies	Shortlist	
2018	Pam Smy	Thornhill	David Fickling Books	—	Shortlist	
2018	Britta Teckentrup	Under the Same Sky	Little Tiger	—	Shortlist	
2019	Jackie Morris	The Lost Words	Hamish Hamilton	Robert Macfarlane	Winner & Shadowers' Choice Award	
2019	Jon Klassen	The Wolf, the Duck and the Mouse	Walker Books	Mac Barnett	Shortlist	
2019	Rebecca Cobb	The Day War Came	Walker Books	Nicola Davies	Shortlist	
2019	Eric Fan and Terry Fan	Ocean Meets Sky	Frances Lincoln	—	Shortlist	
2019	Maria Gulemetova	Beyond the Fence	Child's Play	—	Shortlist	
2019	Jessica Love	Julian is a Mermaid	Walker Books	—	Shortlist	
2019	Poonam Mistry	You're Safe With Me	Lantana Publishing	Chitra Soundar	Shortlist	
2019	David Roberts	Suffragette: The Battle for Equality	Two Hoots		Shortlist	

=== 2020s ===
In 2020, Australian artist Shaun Tan became first BAME author to win the Greenaway Medal in its 64-year history.

In 2022, Long Way Down by Danica Novgorodoff became the first graphic novel to win the medal since Raymond Briggs' Father Christmas in 1973. The 2023 medal also went to a graphic novel. In that year there were only six shortlisted nominees as opposed to the usual slate of eight.

Colour key:

– Medal Winner
– Shadowers' Choice Award winner if different from Medal winner

Medal winners and Shortlists, 2020-
Year	Illustrator	Title	Publisher	Author (if different)	Result	Ref.
2020	Shaun Tan	Tales from the Inner City	Walker Books	—	Winner	
2020	Kadir Nelson	The Undefeated	Andersen Press	Kwame Alexander	Shortlist & Shadowers' Choice Award	
2020	Poonam Mistry	You're Snug with Me	Lantana Publishing	Chitra Soundar	Shortlist	
2020	Chris Mould	The Iron Man	Faber & Faber	Ted Hughes	Shortlist	
2020	Chris Naylor-Ballesteros	The Suitcase	Nosy Crow	—	Shortlist	
2020	Levi Pinfold	The Dam	Walker Books	David Almond	Shortlist	
2020	Júlia Sardà	Mary and Frankenstein	Andersen Press	Linda Bailey	Shortlist	
2020	Beth Waters	Child of St Kilda	Child's Play	—	Shortlist	
2021	Sydney Smith	Small in the City	Walker Books	—	Winner	
2021	Sharon King-Chai	Starbird	Two Hoots	—	Shortlist & Shadowers' Choice Award	
2021	Sara Lundberg	The Bird Within Me	Book Island	— (translated by B. J. Epstein)	Shortlist	
2021	Kate Milner	It's a No-Money Day	Barrington Stoke	—	Shortlist	
2021	Poonam Mistry	How The Stars Came To Be	Tate Publishing	—	Shortlist	
2021	Pete Oswald	Hike	Walker Books	—	Shortlist	
2021	David Ouimet	I Go Quiet	Canongate	—	Shortlist	
2021	Catherine Rayner	Arlo The Lion Who Couldn't Sleep	Pan Macmillan	—	Shortlist	
2022	Danica Novgorodoff	Long Way Down	Faber & Faber	Jason Reynolds	Winner	
2022	Mariachiara Di Giorgio	The Midnight Fair	Walker Books	Gideon Sterer	Shortlist & Shadowers' Choice Award	
2022	George Butler	Drawn Across Borders	Walker Books	—	Shortlist	
2022	Emily Gravett	Too Much Stuff	Pan Macmillan	—	Shortlist	
2022	Christian Robinson	Milo Imagines the World	Pan Macmillan	Matt de la Peña	Shortlist	
2022	Yu Rong	Shu Lin's Grandpa	Otter-Barry Books	Matt Goodfellow	Shortlist	
2022	Sydney Smith	I Talk Like a River	Walker Books	Jordan Scott	Shortlist	
2022	Peter Van den Ende	The Wanderer	Pushkin Children's Books	— (no text)	Shortlist	
2023	Jeet Zdung	Saving Sorya: Chang and the Sun Bear	Kingfisher	Trang Nguyen	Winner	
2023	Joe Todd-Stanton	The Comet	Flying Eye Books	—	Shortlist & Shadowers' Choice Award	
2023	Flora Delargy	Rescuing Titanic	Wide Eyed Editions	—	Shortlist	
2023	Benjamin Phillips	Alte Zachen: Old Things	Cicada	Ziggy Hanaor	Shortlist	
2023	Levi Pinfold	The Worlds We Leave Behind	Bloomsbury Children's Books	A.F. Harrold	Shortlist	
2023	Yu Rong	The Visible Sounds	UCLan	Jianling Yin	Shortlist	
2024	Aaron Becker	The Tree and the River	Walker Books	—	Winner & Shadowers' Choice Award	
2024	Catalina Echeverri	April's Garden	Graffeg	Isla McGuckin	Shortlist	
2024	Mariajo Ilustrajo	Lost	Quarto	—	Shortlist	
2024	Steve McCarthy	The Wilderness	Walker Books	—	Shortlist	
2024	Erika Meza	To the Other Side	Hachette	—	Shortlist	
2024	Poonam Mistry	The Midnight Panther	Bonnier	—	Shortlist	
2024	Catherine Rayner	The Bowerbird	Macmillan	Julia Donaldson	Shortlist	
2024	Chloe Savage	The Search for the Giant Arctic Jellyfish	Walker Books	—	Shortlist	
2025	Olivia Lomenech Gill	Clever Crow	Walker	Chris Butterworth	Winner	
2025	Theo Parish	Homebody	Macmillan	—	Shortlist & Shadowers' Choice Award	
2025	Wen Hsu Chen	The Invisible Story	Lantana	Jaime Gamboa, trans. by Daniel Hahn	Shortlist	
2025	Lauren Child	Grey	Walker	Laura Dockrill	Shortlist	
2025	Mariajo Ilustrajo	I Love Books	Frances Lincoln	—	Shortlist	
2025	Juan Palomino	Letters in Charcoal	Lantana	Irene Vasco, trans. by Lawrence Schimel	Shortlist	
2025	Kate Rolfe	Wolf and Bear	Too Hoots	—	Shortlist	
2025	Yu Rong	Flying High	UCLan	Cao Wenxuan, trans. by Simone Monnelly	Shortlist	
2026	Kate Rolfe	Wiggling Words	Two Hoots	—	Winner	
2026	Aimée de Jongh	Lord of the Flies: The Graphic Novel	Faber	William Golding, adapted by Aimée de Jongh	Shortlist & Shadowers' Choice Award	
2026	Clara Dackenberg	The Playdate	Penguin	Uje Brandelius, trans. by Nichola Smalley	Shortlist	
2026	Linh Dao	The Endless Sea	Walker Studio	Chi Thai	Shortlist	
2026	Baljinder Kaur	The Sleeper Train	Walker	Mick Jackson	Shortlist	
2026	Kengo Kurimoto	Wildful	Pushkin Children's	—	Shortlist	
2026	Oboh Moses	Freedom Braids	Lantana	Monique Duncan	Shortlist	
2026	Seng Soun Ratanavanh	The Paper Bridge	Floris Books	Joelle Veyrenc, trans. by Katy Lockwood-Holmes	Shortlist	

== See also ==
- Carnegie Medal for Writing
- Kurt Maschler Award (the Emil)
- Mother Goose Award
- Caldecott Medal – the primary American Library Association award for picture book illustration
- Comics Literacy Awareness
