= Jane Ray =

English illustrator

Jane Ray (born 11 June 1960) is an English illustrator of more than 70 children's books. The first book Jane illustrated A Balloon for Grandad written by Nigel Gray, is included in 1001 Children's Books You Must Read Before You Grow Up. She is the writer and illustrator of some including Can You Catch a Mermaid? (Orchard Books), Ahmed and the Feather Girl (Frances Lincoln), and The Elephants Garden (Boxer Books). She won the 1992 Nestlé Children's Book Prize in the 6- to 8-year-old readers category for the Story of the Creation, published by Orchard Books (OCLC 59929773), and has been shortlisted for the Kate Greenaway Medal several times. She was also a nominee for the Biennial of Illustration Bratislava 2017.

== Early life ==
Jane Ray was born in Chingford, London and is the daughter of Donald Edwin and Barbara May, both teachers and musicians. Her interest in literature started at a young age with Alice in Wonderland being the first book she ever read. Ray started making books at age five during a summer holiday, her first book which she still owns is called Mr Teddy and Mrs Teddy go for a picnic. She produced a total of thirty books at this time. One of Ray's most prominent influences is Beatrix Potter, of whom she says:

"I was fascinated by detail of her work. She was a scientist as well as an artist and I found that mixture of extremely detailed observation of the natural world and the pure fantasy of ‘dormice in bonnets’ captivating. I used to ‘go into’ those illustrations – imagined I was walking along that lane in Tom Kitten, or sitting amongst the foxgloves in Jemima Puddleduck or walking up the stairs of the doll’s house in The Tale of Two Bad Mice".

Other early influences of Ray's include Lucy Boston, Brian Wildsmith, Arthur Rackham and Jan Pienkowski.

Ray cites her art teacher at school as an influence on her decision to go to art school. She later completed a degree course at Middlesex University in Ceramics and 3 Dimensional Design. She initially wanted to teach deaf children.

== Career ==
Before becoming an author and illustrator, Ray worked in a variety of jobs including a life model, special education teacher, telephone cleaner and mural artist. Ray began her career by designing greetings cards and wrapping paper published by Roger La Borde. Her first full colour picture book, A Balloon for Grandad by Nigel Gray was published in 1989. She has illustrated books by Carol Ann Duffy (The Lost Happy Endings, pub. Bloomsbury), Jeanette Winterson (The King of Capri, Bloomsbury), Michael Rosen (Romeo and Juliet, Walker Books) and Kevin Crossley-Holland (Heartsong, Orchard Books).

Ray takes a hands-on approach to her work, preferring not to use digital technology. She often uses watercolours with pencils, as well as collage and metallic inks to make distinctive decorative patterns. Ray takes a cross-cultural approach to her work, often looking for inspiration in the British Museum. She emphasises the importance of identity in her work and how children can relate to the story's characters at a personal level. Multi-culturalism is an important aspect of Ray's work, with her stating:

"The children I meet are ethnically diverse, and I would frankly, be embarrassed if my "audience" wasn't represented in the books I am making for them. So, from the beginning of my career I have included characters of different ethnicities, and I have particularly enjoyed bringing those differences to the traditional "flaxen haired" European traditions of Grimm, Perrault and Andersen."

In 2016 Ray contributed towards the Nightingale Project which 'brightens up hospitals through the arts'. She produced works for Shannon Ward women's psychiatric intensive care unit at St. Charles Hospital in West London. The project was later extended to Central and North West London NHS Foundation Trust. Ray's work was also displayed at the South Kensington and Chelsea Mental Health Centre. It was opened by Lord Fowler, the Lord Speaker of the House of Lords on the 1st of December 2016. In her work for this project Ray primarily depicted natural imagery such as trees as a way to connect outside life with the wards. Although common in her work, she specifically included birds as they represent freedom. When talking about the project, Ray claims it was 'liberating working on a much larger scale' and says it allowed for her artistic development.

Ray works in a studio located in her garden in London and uses postcards and cuttings to inspire her work.

She was nominated by IBBY UK as the British Nominee for the 2018 Hans Christian Andersen Award.

== Personal life ==
Ray lives and works in London. She is married to conductor David Anthony Temple and has 3 children.

== Bibliography ==
=== As illustrator ===
- A Balloon for Grandad – by Nigel Gray, Orchard
- Casting a Spell and Other Poems – anthology by Angela Huth, Orchard
- Island of the Children – anthology by Angela Huth, Orchard
- The Orchard Book of Creation Stories – Margaret Mayo, Orchard
- The Orchard Book of Mythical Birds and Beasts – Margaret Mayo, Orchard
- The Orchard Book of Magical Tales – Margaret Mayo, Orchard
- The Orchard Book of Love and Friendship – Geraldine Mccaughrean, Orchard
- Heartsong – Kevin Crossley Holland, Orchard
- The Unicorn Prince – Saviour Pirotta, Orchard
- Song of the Earth – Mary Hoffman, Orion
- Sun, Moon and Stars – Mary Hoffman, Orion Arion and the Dolphin – Vikram Seth, Orion
- Mother Gave a Shout – edited by Morag Styles and Suzanna Steele,
- Fairy Tales – retold by Berlie Doherty, Walker Books
- The Bold Boy – Malachy Doyle, Walker Books
- Lugalbanda – Kathy Henderson, Walker Books
- Shakespeare's Romeo and Juliet – Michael Rosen, Walker Books
- Hummingbirds – Nicola Davies, Walker Books
- The King of Capri – Janette Winterson, Bloomsbury
- The Lost Happy Endings – Carol Ann Duffy, Bloomsbury
- Jinnie Ghost – Berlie Doherty, Frances Lincoln
- Greek Myths – Sally Pomme Clayton, Frances Lincoln
- Zeraffa Giraffa – Dianne Hofmeyr, Frances Lincoln
- The Glass Makers Daughter – Dianne Hofmeyr, Frances Lincoln
- The Moonbird – Joyce Dunbar, Doubleday
- Stories for a Fragile Planet – Keneth Steven, Lion Hudson
- Classic Christmas Stories – Mary Joslin, Lion Children's Books
- The Stolen Childhood and Other Dark Fairy Tales – Carol Ann Duffy, Penguin
- From a Distance – Julie Gold, Dutton
- Myths and Legends of the Near East – Rachel Storm, The Folio Society
- Celtic Myths and Legends – Caitlin and John Matthews, The Folio Society
- The Arabian Nights – Powys/Mathews, Folio Society
- Corey's Rock – Sita Brahmachari, Otter-Barry Books
- Worry Angels – Sita Brahmachari, Barrington Stoke
- The Dolls House – Rumer Godden, Macmillan
- The Fairy Doll – Rumer Godden, Macmillan
- Give the Ball to the Poet – poetry anthology edited by Georgie Horrell, Aisha Spencer and Morag Styles, Commonwealth Education Trust Books
- The Pied Piper – Collins Big Cat

=== As author and illustrator ===
- Can You Catch a Mermaid? – Orchard
- The Apple Pip Princess – Orchard
- The Dolls House Fairy – Orchard
- Ahmed and the Feather Girl – Frances Lincoln
- The Elephant's Garden – Boxer Books

=== As adaptor and illustrator ===
- Noah's Ark – Orchard
- The Story of the Creation – Orchard
- The Story of Christmas – Orchard
- The Happy Prince – Orchard
- Adam and Eve and the Garden of Eden – Eden Project
- The Twelve Dancing Princesses – Orchard
- Hansel and Gretel – Walker Books
- Snow White – (pop-up) – Walker Books
- Cinderella – (pop-up) – Walker Books
- The Twelve Days of Christmas – Orchard Books
- The Nutcracker – Orchard Books
- The Emperors Nightingale and other Feathery Tales – Boxer Books
- The Little Mermaid and other Fishy Tales – Boxer Books
- The Lion and the Unicorn and other Hairy Tales – Boxer Books

=== As contributor ===
- Lines in the Sand – Mary Hoffman and Rhiannon Lassiter, Frances Lincoln
- Frances Lincoln A Collection of Just So Stories – Rudyard Kipling, Walker Books
- Play the Shape Game – Anthony Browne, Walker Books
- Fairy Tales of Hans Christian Andersen – Folio Society
- Dare to be Different – Amnesty International
- We Are All Born Free – Amnesty International
- Over the Hills and far Away – Frances Lincoln
- The Orchard Book of Stories from the Opera – Orchard
- Just So Stories – Walker Books
- Under the Sun and Over the Sea – John Agard and Grace Nichols, Walker Books

== Prizes and awards ==
- 1989 shortlisted for the Mother Goose Award for A Balloon For Grandad.
- 1991 shortlisted for the Kate Greenaway Award for Noah's Ark.
- 1992 shortlisted for the Kate Greenaway Award for The Story of Christmas.
- 1992 winner of the Smarties Award (6–8 years) for The Story of Creation.
- 1992 winner of Nestlé Children's Book Prize in the 6- to 8-year-old readers category for the Story of the Creation, published by Orchard Books (OCLC 59929773).
- 1995 shortlisted for the Kate Greenaway Award for The Happy Prince.
- 1995 shortlisted for the Kurt Maschler Award for The Song of the Earth.
- 2001 shortlisted for the Kate Greenaway Award for Fairy Tales.
- 2005 shortlisted for the Kate Greenaway Award for Jinnie Ghost.
- 2008 shortlisted for the Kate Greenaway Award for The Lost Happy Endings.
- 2017 nominated for the Biennial of Illustration Bratislava.
- 2018 BBY UK Illustrator nominee for the Hans Christian Andersen Awards.
