= My Mom =

My Mom or My Mum may refer to:

- "My Mom", song by The Osmond Brothers
- "My Mom", song by Eminem from Relapse
- "My Mom" (Walter Donaldson song), 1932
- My Mum, a 2005 book by Anthony Browne (second in the My Family Member series)
