= Binch (surname) =

Binch is a surname. Notable people with this surname include:

- Briana Binch (born 1987), Australian cricketer
- Caroline Binch (born 1947), English illustrator and writer
- Lloyd Binch (1931–2016), British cyclist
