= Gregory Rogers =

Australian illustrator of picture books

- Born: Gregory John Rogers; 19 June 1957; Brisbane, Queensland
- Died: 1 May 2013 (aged 55)
- Education: Queensland College of Art
- Occupations: Illustrator and Writer of Children's Books
- Writing career
- Language: English
- Notable works: Way Home; The Boy, the Bear, the Baron, and the Bard
- Notable awards: Kate Greenaway Medal

Gregory John Rogers (19 June 1957 – 1 May 2013) was an illustrator and writer of children's books, especially picture books. He was the first Australian to win the annual Kate Greenaway Medal from the Library Association, recognising the year's best children's book illustration by a British subject. The book was Way Home by the Australian writer Libby Hathorn, published in the U.K. by Andersen Press in 1994. In the unnamed city, a boy makes his way home at night and adopts a stray cat en route. The "picture book for older readers" was controversial on grounds both that it was "hardboiled" and that it "romanticised the plight of the homeless".

== Life and career ==
Rogers was born on 19 June 1957, in Brisbane to Marie Bohlscheid and Rex Rogers and grew up in Coorparoo. He studied at the Queensland College of Art (fine art) and worked as a graphic designer before taking up freelance illustration in 1987.

Rogers has illustrated many books including Margaret Card's Aunty Mary's Dead Goat, Ian Trevaskis's The Postman Race, Gary Crew's Tracks and Lucy's Bay, Libby Hathorn's Way Home, and Nigel Gray's Running Away From Home. Beside the Greenaway Medal, Way Home also won a Parents' Choice Award in the U.S. and was shortlisted for the APBA book design awards.

Nevertheless, his most widely held work in WorldCat participating libraries is the first book he both wrote and illustrated, The Boy, the Bear, the Baron, and the Bard. The picture book was published by Allen & Unwin of Australia in 2004 and by Roaring Brook Press that same year in the U.S. It features a timeslip to Shakespeare's London by a boy who follows a soccer ball from Shakespeare's Globe, the modern reconstruction, to the original Globe Theatre. With Midsummer Knight (2006) and The Hero of Little Street (2009) it constitutes a "wordless picture book series" that Publishers Weekly calls his work best known in the U.S.

Rogers played several musical instruments—the cornetto, recorder, and the baroque guitar—performing music of the 16th and 17th centuries. He collected "CDs, antiques, books, and anything that might attract dust". He was also an avid collector of Art Deco items.

Rogers died 1 May 2013 in Brisbane from stomach cancer.

== Books ==
=== Solo works ===
According to Publishers Weekly, Rogers was "best known in [the U.S.] for his sequence of three wordless picture books".

- The Boy, The Bear, The Baron, The Bard (Crows Nest, New South Wales: Allen & Unwin, 2004)
- Midsummer Knight (2006)
- The Hero of Little Street (2009)
- Omar the Strongman, text and illustrations (Scholastic Press, 2013), OCLC 849998521

=== As illustrator ===
- Enter Bob Dickinson (1988) by Kay Arthur
- Grandma's Memories (1989) by Virginia King
- Zoe At The Fancy Dress Ball (1990) by Susan Reid
- Lucy Meets A Dragon (1990) by Susan Reid
- Aunty Mary's Dead Goat (1990) by Margaret Card
- The Postman's Race (1991) by Ian Trevaskis
- Space Travellers (1992) by Margaret Wild
- Tracks (1992) by Gary Crew
- Lucy's Bay (1992) by Gary Crew
- Great Grandpa (1994) by Susan McQuade
- Way Home (Andersen, 1994) by Libby Hathorn
- The Bent-Back Bridge (1995) by Gary Crew
- Running Away From Home (1996) by Nigel Gray
- The Island (1996) by Michael O'Hara
- What Goes With Toes? (1996) by Jeri Kroll
- Beyond The Dusk (2000) by Victor Kelleher
- The Platypus (2000) by Jo Brice
- The Gift (2000) by Libby Hathorn
- Princess Max (2001) by Laurie Stiller
- The Rainbow (2001) by Gary Crew
- Theseus and the Minotaur (2002) by Janeen Brian
- Tiddalick the Thirsty Frog (2003) by Mark Carthew
- The Brothers Grim (2004) by Janeen Brian
- It's True! Fashion Can Be Fatal (2004) by Susan Green
- Flitterwig (2009) by Edrei Cullen
- Clearheart (2009) by Edrei Cullen
- Scatterbungle (2011) by Edrei Cullen
