= Christian Birmingham =

British illustrator and artist

Christian Birmingham is a British illustrator and artist who has worked with children's writers including the Children's Laureate Michael Morpurgo, on books including Whitbread Children's Book of the Year The Wreck of the Zanzibar and Smarties Prize winner The Butterfly Lion. He was also shortlisted for the Kurt Maschler Award and Kate Greenaway Medal for illustration.

Birmingham graduated from Exeter College of Art and Design in 1991 with a first-class honours degree in graphic design (illustration). He won his first book illustration contract soon after leaving college and has since worked with major British and American publishers on titles including the centenary picturebook edition of C. S. Lewis's The Lion, The Witch and the Wardrobe and Clement C. Moore's classic poem The Night Before Christmas (which has sold more than 1.5 million copies). He has also illustrated two sets of Royal Mail special stamps, to commemorate 100 years of the Rugby league and the centenary of the birth of children's author Enid Blyton.

Christian's illustration artwork has been shown at the Australian High Commission, to celebrate the publication of Wombat Goes Walkabout, and at the Air Gallery in Mayfair and Mall Galleries in Westminster, London in exhibitions hosted by Books Illustrated Ltd in December 2007 and 2009 to celebrate the publication of The Snow Queen and The Little Mermaid. His landscape artwork has been exhibited at the Royal Society of Marine Artists, Pastel Society and New English Art Club annual exhibitions.

== Selected books illustrated ==
- A Christmas Carol
- The Lion, the Witch and the Wardrobe
- Little Farmer Joe
- Oliver Twist
- The Classic Tales of Hans Christian Andersen
- Wombat Goes Walkabout
- Sleeping Beauty
- The Night Before Christmas
- Wenceslas
- The Snow Queen
- The Little Mermaid
- A Midsummer Night's Dream
- Wuthering Heights
- Tod and the Clock Angel
- Dick King-Smith's Countryside Treasury
- A Baby for Grace
- A Kitten Called Moonlight
- The Magical Bicycle
- The Silver Swan
- This Morning I Met a Whale
- The Butterfly Lion
- Shadow
