= Alborough =

Alborough is an English surname. Notable people with the surname include:

- Jez Alborough (born 1959), English writer and illustrator
- Paul Alborough (born 1975), English musician
- Roger Alborough (born 1953), English actor
