= The Jolly Postman =

1986 interactive children's picture book by Janet and Allan Ahlberg

- Front cover of unknown edition
- Author: Janet and Allan Ahlberg
- Illustrator: Janet Ahlberg
- Cover artist: Janet Ahlberg
- Language: English
- Series: The Jolly Postman
- Genre: Children's picture book, verse short story
- Publisher: Heinemann
- Publication date: 1986
- Publication place: United Kingdom
- Media type: Print (hardcover movable)
- Pages: 48 pages, envelopes, and enclosures
- ISBN: 0-434-92515-2
- OCLC: 59229153
- LC Class: PZ8.3.A278 Jo 1986
- Followed by: The Jolly Christmas Postman, The Jolly Pocket Postman

The Jolly Postman or Other People's Letters is an interactive children's picture book by Janet and Allan Ahlberg. The innovative project required five years to complete, and much discussion with both the publisher Heinemann and the printer before it was issued in 1986. The first subject heading assigned by WorldCat is "Toy and movable books". Little, Brown published a U.S. edition in the same year.

The Jolly Postman has sold more than six million copies, Allan Ahlberg told The Guardian in 2006. It made innovative use of envelopes to include letters, cards, games and a tiny book.

Alternatively, The Jolly Postman is a series of three books including 1991 and 1995 sequels to The Jolly Postman, or Other people's letters. In the U.K., the first book received the Red House Children's Book Award and the Kurt Maschler Award. The second book won the 1991 Greenaway Medal for British children's book illustration.

== Summary ==
The Jolly Postman follows an unnamed mail carrier as he delivers letters by bicycle to characters from traditional children's stories that are well known in Britain. Following each sheet of narrative verse and illustration, there is one shaped like an envelope and containing one of the postman's deliveries. Each envelope is opened and its enclosure read at that point in the story.

WorldCat gives the entire description: "A Jolly Postman delivers letters to several famous fairy-tale characters such as the Big Bad Wolf, Cinderella, and the Three Bears. Twelve of the pages have been made into six envelopes and contain eight letters and cards. Each letter may be removed from its envelope page and read separately." (Note: These are catalogue records from participating libraries, which vary even among copies of the same edition, and many provide no description or nothing useful.)

== Awards ==
The Ahlbergs won two major British book awards for The Jolly Postman, the 1986 Kurt Maschler Award and 1987 Red House Children's Book Award. The Dutch translation of the book De puike postbode won the Boekensleutel literary award in 1988.

From 1982 to 1999 the "Emil" figurines from Maschler publishers and BookTrust annually recognised the creator(s) of one "work of imagination for children, in which text and illustration are integrated so that each enhances and balances the other". The Federation of Children's Book Groups award (now named for the bookseller Red House) "celebrate[s] the books that children themselves love reading". The winner is determined by vote of British children.

Janet Ahlberg was a commended runner up for the 1986 Greenaway Medal (Note: Today there are usually eight books on the Greenaway shortlist. According to CCSU, some runners up through 2002 were Commended (from 1959) or Highly Commended (from 1974). There were 99 commendations of both kinds in 44 years including six in 1986. No book series has won two Greenaway Medals. Chris Riddell was the highly commended runner up and the Medal winner, 1999 and 2001, for illustrating two books in the Diary series by Richard Platt. Graham Oakley was highly commended runner up in 1976 and 1982 for two books in his Church Mice series.) and she won the 1991 Greenaway for the sequel. The annual award by the Library Association then recognised the year's best children's book illustration by a British subject.

== Series ==
Following The Jolly Postman's success, the Ahlbergs and Heinemann produced two sequels. The latter, third in the series, was published after Janet's death in 1994. For the second book, The Jolly Christmas Postman, she won her second Kate Greenaway Medal.

- The Jolly Postman (1986, U.K.)

"A Jolly Postman delivers letters to several famous fairy-tale characters such as the Big Bad Wolf, Cinderella, and the Three Bears. Twelve of the pages have been made into six envelopes and contain eight letters and cards. Each letter may be removed from its envelope page and read separately."

- The Jolly Christmas Postman (1991, U.K. ISBN 0-434-92532-2)

"A Jolly Postman delivers Christmas cards to several famous fairy-tale characters such as the Big Bad Wolf, Cinderella, and the Three Bears. Each card may be removed from its envelope page and read separately. With 6 letters in pockets".

- The Jolly Pocket Postman (1995, U.K. ISBN 0434969427, 60236253)

"Join the jolly postman with his mailbag of delightful deliveries for Dorothy from Oz, Alice from Wonderland, and other favorite storybook characters."

== See also ==
- Pop-up book
- Toy book
- List of Christmas-themed literature
