= Levi Pinfold =

British author and illustrator

- Education: Falmouth University
- Known for: Harry Potter illustrations
- Notable work: Black Dog
- Awards: Kate Greenaway Medal; 2013 Black Dog – Illustrator
- Website: levipinfold.com.au

Levi Pinfold is a British artist, writer and illustrator from Gloucestershire, England, who won the Kate Greenaway Medal in 2013 for his illustrations for the picture book Black Dog. He is the illustrator for the final two books in the Harry Potter Illustrated Edition series.

== Personal life ==
Pinfold was born in the Forest of Dean, Gloucestershire. He started drawing from a young age. He currently lives in Australia on the Sunshine Coast, Queensland, with his photographer wife. He attempts to grow vegetables in his spare time.

== Career ==
Since graduating from Falmouth University in 2006, Pinfold has worked as a self employed illustrator.

Pinfold debuted in 2010 with the picture book The Django, inspired by jazz legend Django Reinhardt. This book earned him the Booktrust Best New Illustrators Award. Published by Templar Books in 2011, his second picture book Black Dog won the 2013 Kate Greenaway Medal.

In 2015, he illustrated Greenling, a picture book about a green baby creature suddenly appears on the Barleycorn family's farm in Australia. In 2016, he illustrated The Secret Horses of Briar Hill by Megan Shepherd. He also illustrated The Song from Somewhere Else by A. F. Harrold. In 2017, he designed the cover for Bloomsbury's 20th Anniversary Hogwarts House Edition of Harry Potter. In 2019, he illustrated The Dam by David Almond. From 2021 to 2024, he continued to illustrate many books for the authors Hannah Gold and A. F. Harrold. In March 2025, Bloomsbury announced Levi as the illustrator for the final two books in the Harry Potter Illustrated Editions series, continuing the visual storytelling started by Jim Kay.

== Works ==
As author and illustrator

- The Django (2010)
- Black Dog (2011)
- Greenling (2015)
- Pictura Prints: Medieval Town (2017)
- The Paradise Sands (2022)

As illustrator

- The Secret Horses of Briar Hill (2016) by Megan Shepherd
- The Song from Somewhere Else (2016) by A. F. Harrold
- The Dam (2019) by David Almond
- The Last Bear (2021) by Hannah Gold
- The Lost Whale (2022) by Hannah Gold
- Finding Bear (2023) by Hannah Gold
- The Worlds We Leave Behind (2024) by A. F. Harrold
- Turtle Moon (2024) by Hannah Gold
- Norse Mythology (Illustrated Edition) (2024) by Neil Gaiman
- The Lone Husky (2025) by Hannah Gold
- Harry Potter and the Half-Blood Prince (Illustrated Edition, 2026)
- Harry Potter and the Deathly Hallows (TBA)
