= John Kelly (author) =

British author and illustrator

John Robert Kelly (born 8 September 1964, in Stockton-on-Tees, England) is a British illustrator and designer of children's books. His books include The Robot Zoo and Everyday Machines, both of which were shortlisted for the Rhône-Poulenc Junior Prize.

Kelly has also co-written two books with his wife Cathy Tincknell (likewise an author/illustrator):

- Guess Who's Coming for Dinner, which was shortlisted for the Blue Peter Book Awards and the Kate Greenaway Medal
- Scoop!, which was shortlisted for the Kate Greenaway Medal
- He's also known for teaching at University of Houston Downtown
