= Jim Kay =

British illustrator and printmaker (born 1974)

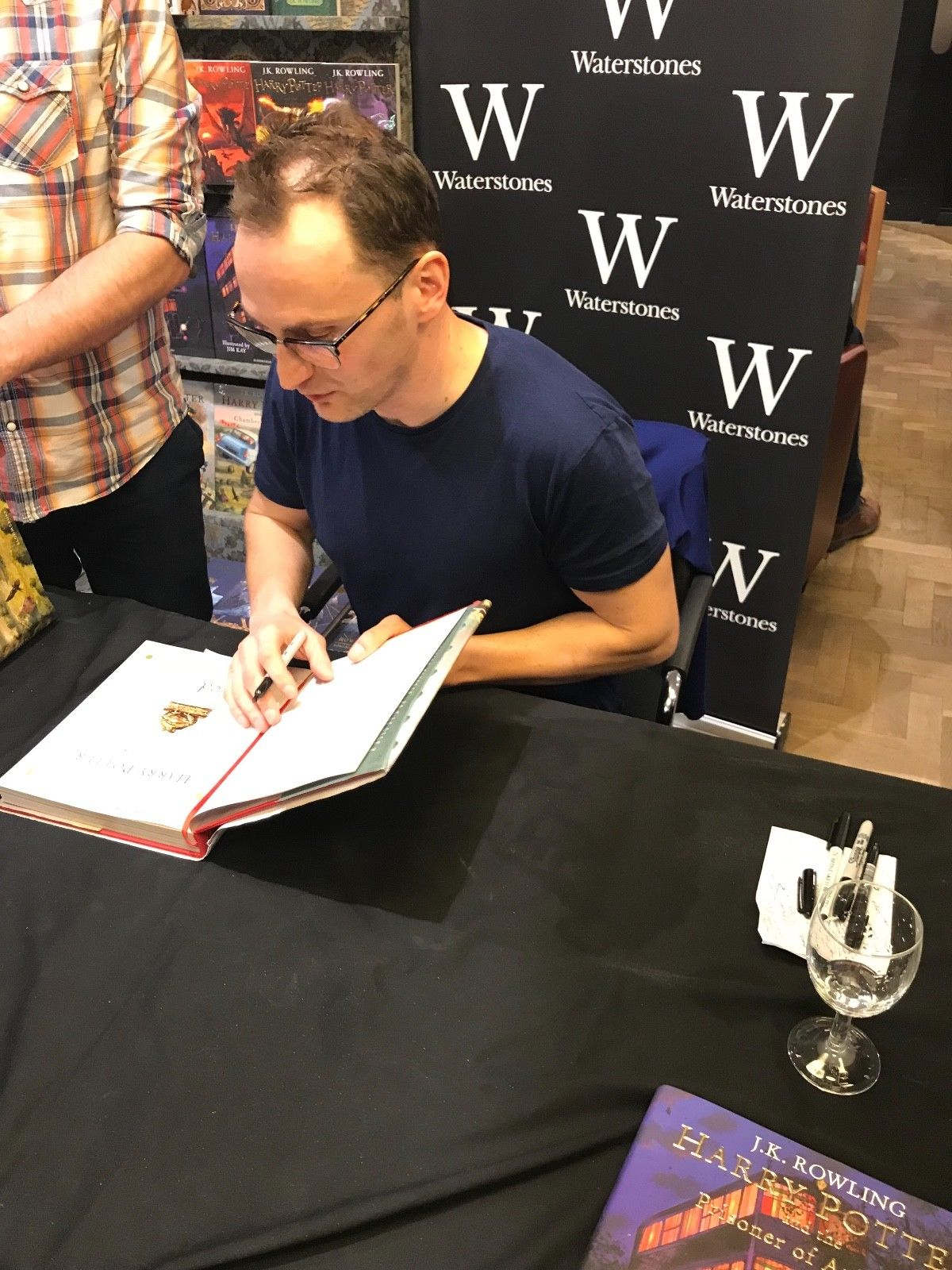
- Jim Kay at a book signing in 2018.
- Born: 4 April 1974 (age 52)
- Education: BA Honours of Illustration and Visual Communication
- Alma mater: University of Westminster
- Known for: Harry Potter Illustrated Editions series
- Notable work: A Monster Calls; Harry Potter
- Awards: Kate Greenaway Medal; 2012 A Monster Calls – Illustrator
- Website: www.creepyscrawlers.com

Jim Kay (born 4 April 1974) is a British illustrator and printmaker from Northamptonshire, England, who won the Kate Greenaway Medal in 2012 for his illustrations for the book A Monster Calls by Patrick Ness. He was selected personally by J. K. Rowling to present colour illustrations of every title in the Harry Potter series.

== Career ==
Kay's first love was for art and for natural history, in particular for botany and entomology and its relationship with the environment. He attended the University of Westminster at the Harrow Campus, a vantage point for views of London in the smog which had been used by Victorian painters.

For two years, Kay worked at Tate Britain, in the Archives, working with the personal papers of artists such as Paul Nash and Stanley Spencer. His later work as the Assistant Curator for the Illustrations Collection at the Royal Botanic Gardens at Kew brought him into contact with the rich archives from Indian art collections, illustrated manuscripts, herbals and the records from the era of British exploration across the world, in particular the work of Indian artists employed by botanists to produce paintings of local flora.

In 2008, Kay produced a one-man exhibition which was shown in Richmond on the theme of producing ideas for children's books.

In 2012, he received his first Kate Greenaway Medal for his illustrations in the book A Monster Calls by Patrick Ness.

In 2013, he was selected personally by J. K. Rowling to present illustrations of every title in the Harry Potter series. The first four were released between 2015 and 2019.

On 24 January 2022, Bloomsbury confirmed that the illustrated edition of Harry Potter and the Order of the Phoenix would be released on 11 October.

On 17 February 2022, Bloomsbury announced that the fifth book not only contained Jim Kay's artworks, but also featured illustrations from the award-winning illustrator Neil Packer.

On 7 October 2022, it was announced that Jim Kay will be stepping down from his role to focus on his mental health. Bloomsbury said they will continue to work with other artists to illustrate the remaining books. In March 2025, Bloomsbury announced Levi Pinfold as the illustrator for the final two books in the Harry Potter Illustrated Editions series.

== Works ==
- A Monster Calls (Illustrated Edition, 2011)
- Bugs: A Pop-up Journey into the World of Insects, Spiders and Creepy-crawlies (Illustrated Edition, 2013)
- The Great War (Illustrated Edition, 2014)
- Harry Potter and the Philosopher's Stone (Illustrated Edition, 2015)
- Harry Potter and the Chamber of Secrets (Illustrated Edition, 2016)
- Harry Potter and the Prisoner of Azkaban (Illustrated Edition, 2017)
- Harry Potter and the Goblet of Fire (Illustrated Edition, 2019)
- Harry Potter and the Order of the Phoenix (Illustrated Edition, 2022)
