= William Grill =

British illustrator (born 1990)

- Born: 1990 (age 35–36)
- Education: University College Falmouth
- Website: williamgrill.co.uk

William Grill is a British illustrator, whose first children's book, Shackleton's Journey, depicting Ernest Shackleton's Imperial Trans-Antarctic Expedition, won the Kate Greenaway Medal in 2015.

His second book is titled The Wolves of Currumpaw, and is based on the story "Lobo the King of Currumpaw," (from Wild Animals I Have Known) by naturalist Ernest Thompson Seton.

== Biography ==
Grill grew up in rural Hampshire and worked on a farm as a young adult, experiences which have influenced his art and writing. He graduated from University College Falmouth, is dyslexic, and runs a weekly art club at a local school.

== Awards and honors ==
Two of Grill's books are Junior Library Guild selections: The Wolves of Currumpaw (2016) and Earth Verse (2018). In 2014, The New York Times named Shackleton's Journey one of the best illustrated books of the year. The Wolves of Currumpaw received a starred review from Publishers Weekly, and Bandoola received a starred review from Booklist.

When Grill won the Kate Greenaway Medal in 2015 at age 24 for Shackleton's Journey, he was the youngest person to have earned the award since 1960. In addition to the Greenaway Medal, Grill won the Colin Mears Award.

Awards for Grill's books
| Year | Title | Award | Result | Ref. |
|---|---|---|---|---|
| 2015 | Shackleton's Journey | Kate Greenaway Medal | Winner | |
| 2015 | Shackleton's Journey | School Library Association Information Book Award | Winner | |
| 2016 | The Wolves of Currumpaw | Cybils Award for Elementary and Middle Grade Graphic Novel | Finalist | |
| 2017 | The Wolves of Currumpaw | Bolognaragazzi Award | Winner | |
| 2017 | The Wolves of Currumpaw | Kate Greenaway Medal | Shortlist | |
| 2017 | The Wolves of Currumpaw | Spur Award for Best Western Juvenile Nonfiction | Winner | |
| 2018 | The Wolves of Currumpaw | Zilveren Penseel | Winner | |

== Publications ==
=== As author and illustrator ===
- Shackleton's Journey (2014, Flying Eye Books, ISBN 978-1-909263-10-9)
- Shackleton's Journey Activity Book (2015, Flying Eye Books, ISBN 978-1-909263-80-2)
- The Wolves of Currumpaw (2016, Flying Eye Books, ISBN 978-1-909263-83-3)
- Bandoola: The Great Elephant Rescue (2022, Flying Eye Books, ISBN 978-1-83874-023-8)

=== As illustrator only ===
- Earth Verse: Haiku from the Ground Up, written by Sally M. Walker (2018, Candlewick Press, ISBN 978-0-7636-7512-7)
