= Brian Wildsmith =

British illustrator (1930–2016)

- Born: Brian Lawrence Wildsmith; 22 January 1930; Penistone, West Riding of Yorkshire
- Died: 31 August 2016 (aged 86); Grasse, Alpes-Maritimes, France
- Education: Slade School of Fine Art
- Known for: Painting and illustrations
- Spouse(s): Aurélie Ithurbide (m. 1955–2015, her death); 4 children

Brian Lawrence Wildsmith (22 January 1930 – 31 August 2016) was a British painter and children's book illustrator. He won the 1962 Kate Greenaway Medal for British children's book illustration, for the wordless alphabet book ABC. In all his books, the illustrations are always as important as the text.

For his contribution as a children's illustrator, Wildsmith was a runner-up for the Hans Christian Andersen Medal in 1966 and 1968.

== Biography ==
Brian Wildsmith was born in 1930 in Penistone, a small market town in the West Riding, now in South Yorkshire, England. He was educated at the De La Salle College for Boys in Sheffield, but from the age of seventeen studied at the Barnsley School of Art (1946–1949). It was also while he was seventeen that he met Aurélie Ithurbide, daughter of the chef at Wentworth Woodhouse, whom he would later marry. From Barnsley he won a scholarship to the Slade School of Fine Art in London, where he studied for three years (1949–1952), and where Sir William Coldstream was among his teachers.

On leaving the Slade School he did National Service in the British Army. In 1955 he married his wife Aurélie, and in the same year began teaching at Selhurst High School (1955–1957). At this time he began designing book jackets for the publisher John Murray and others, and line illustrations for children's books published by Faber and Faber, Penguin Books, Oxford University Press and others. His work as a line draughtsman continued from 1957 to 1964. From 1960 to 1965 he also taught for one day a week at Maidstone College of Art (later part of Kent Institute of Art & Design, now University for the Creative Arts).

Wildsmith's first love was for painting and he was eager to illustrate books in color. Mabel George of Oxford University Press, whom he first met in 1957, gave him his first opportunity when she commissioned from him, as an experiment, some illustrations for Arabian Nights (1961). When the experiment was a success, she commissioned ABC (1962), which won the Greenaway Medal. Since then he has worked with a succession of sympathetic editors, including Antony Kamm and Ron Heapy.

From 1971 Wildsmith lived in France at Castellaras, a hill village near Cannes and Grasse, with his wife, Aurélie, and their four children, Clare, Rebecca, Anna and Simon. His son, Simon (b. 1965), is a printmaker, and lives near Cahors.

Wildsmith is considered as one of the greatest children's illustrators. The British Library Association recognised his first book, the wordless alphabet book ABC (Oxford, 1962), with the Kate Greenaway Medal for the year's best children's book illustration by a British subject. Four of his works were subsequently commended runners-up (Note: Today there are usually eight books on the Greenaway shortlist. According to CCSU, some runners up through 2002 were Commended (from 1959) or Highly Commended (from 1974). There were 99 distinctions of both kinds in 44 years including four for 1963, three 1967, and two 1971.) for the Medal, all published by Oxford University Press: Oxford Book of Poetry for Children, edited by Edward Blishen, 1963; The Lion and the Rat: A Fable, by Jean de La Fontaine (1668), adapted from Aesop, also 1963; Birds, 1967; and The Owl and the Woodpecker, 1971. Each page of Birds illustrates a term such as "gaggle of geese". The Owl and the Woodpecker is a story both written and illustrated by Wildsmith.

The biennial Hans Christian Andersen Award conferred by the International Board on Books for Young People is the highest recognition available to a writer or illustrator of children's books. Wildsmith was one of two runners-up for the inaugural illustration award in 1966 and one of three runners-up in 1968.

In 1994 a Brian Wildsmith Art Museum was opened in Izu-kogen, in the south of Tokyo, Japan. About one and a half million people visited an exhibition of his work in 2005. Eight hundred of his paintings are on loan to the museum.

In 2017 The Story Museum, UK, ran an exhibition called Wild About Colour featuring a number of pieces by Wildsmith alongside works by contemporary illustrators who had been influenced by his use of colour. The exhibition was curated by Helen Cooper and displayed the work of Shaun Tan and Korky Paul amongst others.

Wildsmith died in Grasse, France, in 2016.

== Selected works ==
- Indian Delight (Dolphin Books, 1958)
- ABC (Oxford, 1962) —winner of the Greenaway Medal
- 1 2 3 (Oxford, 1965)
- Birds (Oxford, 1967)
- The Circus (Oxford, 1970)
- The Owl and the Woodpecker (Oxford, 1971)
- Little Wood Duck, Oxford University Press, Oxford 1972.
- A Christmas story (Oxford, 1989)
- The Easter story (Oxford, 1993)
- Saint Francis (Oxford, 1997)
- Exodus (Oxford, 1998)
- Jesus (Oxford, 2000)
- Mary (Oxford, 2007)
- Moses (Oxford, 2007)

== Works about Wildsmith ==
- Brian Wildsmith and Edna Edwards, Focus on Brian Wildsmith, the great illustrator talks about making images for children (The Center for Cassette Studies, 1974), 50-minute sound recording)
- Stephanie Nettell, "Crossing barriers: an interview with Brian Wildsmith", in Children's Book Supplement to British Book News (March 1987), pp. 2–5
- Brian Wildsmith, Brian Wildsmith (1930- ) A Short Autobiography (1988. Gale Research, Detroit)
- D. Martin, "Brian Wildsmith", in Douglas Martin, The Telling Line Essays On Fifteen Contemporary Book Illustrators (1989), pp. 126–47
- Brian Wildsmith [exhibition catalogue, Tokyo] (1995)
