= Carol Barker =

British artist, author and illustrator (born 1938)

- Born: 16 February 1938
- Education: Bournemouth College of Art; Chelsea Polytechnic; Central School of Arts and Crafts
- Known for: Writing, drawing, children's literature
- Notable work: The Bald Twit Lion; Achilles the Donkey
- Children: 2
- Father: John Rowland Barker

Carol Mintum Barker (born 16 February 1938) is an English artist-designer, author and illustrator who is notable for her poster designs, postage stamps and book illustrations, many of them for children.

== Life and career ==
Barker is the daughter of British artist John Rowland Barker. As a child she was evacuated to New York during World War II, but returned to Britain and attended Bournemouth College of Art whilst also studying privately at her father's studio. She went on to study painting at Chelsea Polytechnic and illustration at the Central School of Arts and Crafts under the tutelage of Laurence Scarfe, Merlyn Evans and Raymond Roberts.

Barker became a freelance illustrator in 1958. She was married and had two sons.

Her entry in the Dictionary of British Book Illustrators states "Her work, in pen and ink, watercolour, collage and wax, is decorative rather than spatial in character."

As a book illustrator, Barker collaborated with many authors including John Cunliffe, Spike Milligan and H. E. Bates who wrote the prose for his children's book Achilles the Donkey around her pictures. So integral were her illustrations that in some instances she was given equal billing as a co-author on the book jackets. This can be seen on the covers of Spike Milligan's A Bald Twit Lion and H. E. Bates Achilles the Donkey series amongst others. She would go on to be nominated twice for the Kate Greenaway medal.

As a graphic artist, Barker is known to have designed posters and artwork for London Transport and posters and stamps for the Post Office. Her poster "Children's London" was praised by Modern Publicity magazine in 1974 as one of the best British posters of the previous year. Examples of her work can be found in the collections of the British Council, London Transport Museum, The Postal Museum and The Science Museum.

== Selected awards ==
Year	Work	Award	Result	Ref.
1962	Achilles the Donkey by H. E. Bates (Dennis Dobson)	Kate Greenaway Medal	Runner-up / commended	
1972	King Midas and the Golden Touch by Carol Barker (Franklin Watts)	Kate Greenaway Medal	Commended	
Unknown	Unknown	The Scotsman 'International Book Jacket Competition'	Won	

== Selected exhibitions ==
- 1988: (November) Barker's work was exhibited at the Barbican Centre in London. It featured illustrations, drawings and photographs of her visit to a refugee camp in Peshawar, Pakistan and to the drought-prone Indian state of Rajasthan whilst carrying out research for her books, A Question of Refugees and A Question of Hunger.
- 2017–2019: Barker's work for London Transport was selected as part of London Transport Museum's Poster Girls exhibition commemorating female graphic designers and was featured in an accompanying BBC news article.

== Bibliography ==
=== Novels ===
Year	Title	Publisher	Notes
1968	The Boy and the Lion	Dennis Dobson	Published in the US as The Boy and the Lion on the Wall by Franklin Watts
1972	King Midas and the Golden Touch	Franklin Watts	Nominated for the Kate Greenaway medal (1972)

=== Non-fiction ===
Year	Title	Publisher	Notes
1971	Birds and Beasts	Franklin Watts	Reviewed in Los Angeles Times
1973	The Alphabet	Hamlyn	
1974	How the World Began	Abelard-Schuman	
1976	An Oba of Benin	Macdonald & Jane's	Translated into German, Norwegian, Welsh
1976	A Prince of Islam	Macdonald & Jane's	Translated into German, Norwegian, Welsh Reviewed in Teaching History
1979	Arjun in His Village in India	Oxford University Press	Translated into German, Swedish. Reviews
1982	Kayode in His Village in Nigeria	Oxford University Press	
1984	Village in Nigeria	A&C Black	Translated into Dutch
1985	Ananda in Sri Lanka. A story of Buddhism	Hamish Hamilton	
1986	The United Nations. Its work in the World	Macdonald	
1988	A Question of Refugees	Macdonald	
1988	A Question of Feeding the World	Macdonald	
1998	The Tibetans. Life in exile	Mantra	in association with The Tibet Foundation

=== Illustration / graphic design ===
Year	Author	Work / Title	Publisher	Notes
1959		Time and Tune	BBC School Radio	Autumn Term Booklet
1960		Postal Addresses	The Post Office (GPO)	Poster. PRD 1077
1960		London Post Offices and Streets	The Post Office (GPO)	Poster. PRD 1072
1960		Post Offices in the United Kingdom	The Post Office (GPO)	Poster. PRD 1076
1960	Sylvia Townsend Warner	The Cat's Cradle-Book	Chatto & Windus	Dustjacket
1960	Maureen Howard	Not a Word about Nightingales	Secker & Warburg	Dustjacket
1961	Curtis Harnack	The Work of an Ancient Hand	Weidenfeld & Nicolson	Dustjacket
1961	Fred Kitchen	The Ploughman Homeward Plods	Country Book Club	Dustjacket
1961	Paul Gallico	Too Many Ghosts	Michael Joseph	Dustjacket
1961		Time and Tune	BBC School Radio	Spring Term Booklet
1961	Jane Brown Gemmill	The Little Bear and the Princess	Abelard-Schuman	
1962	Aileen Fisher	I wonder how, I wonder why	Abelard-Schuman	
1962	Frances Armytage	Georgian England	Ginn	6 volumes: [1] Life in a country house. [2] Life in a manufacturing town. [3] Roads and waterways. [4] Sailors and ships. [5] Life in a village. [6] A trip to a watering place.
1962		Famous Stories of High Adventure	Arthur Barker	Selected and edited by Leonard Reginald Gribble
1962		Swift Annual	Odhams Press	
1962	H. E. Bates	Achilles the Donkey	Dennis Dobson	Nominated for the Kate Greenaway medal (1962)
1962	Norman Wymer	Gilbert and Sullivan	Methuen	
1962	Roger Lancelyn Green	Ancient Greece	Rupert Hart Davis	
1962	Lyn Irvine	Field with Geese	Country Book Club	Dustjacket
1962	Mildred Lewis	The Honourable Sword	Deutsch	Dustjacket
1962	Sylvia Townsend Warner	A Spirit Rises	Chatto & Windus	Dustjacket
1963	Mariana Villa-Gilbert	Mrs Galbraith's Air	Chatto & Windus	Dustjacket
1963	Daniel Roberts	Nibbleneat	Oxford University Press	
1963	H. E. Bates	Achilles and Diana	Dennis Dobson	
1963	Eileen Colwell	A Storyteller's Choice. A selection of stories with notes on how to tell them	Bodley Head	
1963	Julia Rhys	The Tinsel November	Rupert Hart-Davis	
1964	H. E. Bates	Achilles and the Twins	Dennis Dobson	
1964	John Cunliffe	Farmer Barnes Buys a Pig	Deutsch	
1964	Andre Launay	Caviare and After. The Truth About Luxury Food	Macdonald	
1964	Yvonne Meynier	The School with a Difference	Abelard-Schuman	
1964	Norman Goodland	Old Stan's Diary: Autumn & Winter on the Farm	Country Book Club	Dustjacket
1964	Miss Read	Country Bunch	Country Book Club	Dustjacket
1964	Leo Walmsley	Paradise Creek	Country Book Club	Dustjacket
1964	Annabel Dilke	Rule III, Pretend to be Nice	Chatto & Windus	Dustjacket
1965	Mabel Watts	The Light Across Piney Valley	Abelard-Schuman	
1965	Noel Lloyd & Geoffrey Palmer	Quest for Prehistory	Dennis Dobson	
1965	Lauchmonen	Old Thom's Harvest	Eyre & Spottiswoode	Dustjacket
1965	Jocelyn Davey	A Killing in Hats	Chatto & Windus	Dustjacket
1966	Perdita Buchan	Girl with a Zebra	Chatto & Windus	Dustjacket
1966	Georgina Groves	Morning Glory	Whiting & Wheaton	
1966	John Cunliffe	Farmer Barnes and Bluebell	Deutsch	
1966		Rain and Shine. Nursery Rhymes for the Four Seasons	Blackie	
1966		Fenton House	London Transport	Poster. Printed by The Baynard Press
1967	Rumer Godden	The Kitchen Madonna	Macmillan	
1967	Andre Launay	Posh Food	Penguin	
1968	Janet McNeill	It's Snowing Outside	Macmillan	
1968	Richard Parker	Lost in a Shop	Macmillan	
1968	Mariana Villa-Gilbert	A Jingle-Jangle Song	Chatto & Windus	Dustjacket
1968	Spike Milligan	The Bald Twit Lion	Dennis Dobson	
1969		London Museum	London Transport	Poster. Printed by John Swain and Son Ltd
1969	Amanda McKittrick Ros	Helen Huddleson	Chatto & Windus	
1969	Margaret Mahy	Pillycock's Shop	Dennis Dobson	
1970	P. M. Pickard	The Dancing Harp	Ginn	
1971	Margaret Mahy	The Princess and the Clown	Dennis Dobson	
1971		Troubadour (No. 1)	Malcolm Peltu and Adel Hamadi	Magazine cover in conjunction with Adel Hamadi
1972	Helen Hoke	Dragons, Dragons, Dragons	Franklin Watts	
1972	Sandie Oram	The Sun People	Macdonald & Co	
1973	Nicholas Fisk	Emma Borrows a Cup of Sugar	Heinemann	
1973		Children's London	London Transport	Poster. Printed by The Baynard Press. Praised by Modern Publicity in 1974 as one of the best British posters of the previous year.
1974	Margaret Mayo	If You Should Meet a Crocodile, and Other Verse	Kaye & Ward	
1975	Helen Hoke	Devils, Devils, Devils	Franklin Watts	
1979	Audrey Aarons & Hugh Hawes	Child-to-Child	Macmillan Press	Published on behalf of the Child to Child programme
1979		London's Museums	London Transport	Printed by Impress Ltd
1982	Spike Milligan	Sir Nobonk and the Terrible, Awful, Dreadful, Naughty, Nasty Dragon	M. J. Hobbs	
1983	Miriam Hodgson	A Touch of Gold. Stories from the Greek Myths	Methuen	
1986	John Snelling	Buddhist Stories	Wayland	
1987	John Snelling	The Life of the Buddha	Wayland	
1992	Umaya Aafjes-Sinnadurai	The Kingdom of Benin: National Curriculum History Key Stage 2	Commonwealth Institute	Published by Curriculum Development and Resources Section
