= Peter Bently =

British writer (born 1960)

- Born: 1960 (age 65–66); Tidworth, Hampshire, England
- Occupation: Writer
- Spouse: Lucy Curtin
- Writing career
- Genre: Children's literature

Peter Bently (born 29 December 1960) is a British children's writer. He is best known for his rhyming picture books including The Great Dog Bottom Swap (illustrated by Mei Matsuoka), Meet the Parents (with Sara Ogilvie), The Shark in the Dark (with Ben Cort) and Potion Commotion (with Sernur Isik). His books have won several awards including the 2022 Children's Book Award (UK) for Octopus Shocktopus, illustrated by Steven Lenton. Cats Ahoy!, his first picture book with Jim Field, won the Roald Dahl Funny Prize 2011 and King Jack and the Dragon (with Helen Oxenbury) was named as an American Library Association Notable Book of the year.

== Life ==
Peter Bently was born in 1960 in Tidworth, Hampshire, England. His father's job as an army bandmaster meant that Bently grew up in a variety of places in England and abroad, including Germany, Singapore and Hong Kong, and was educated at ten schools. After studying languages at Oxford, Bently worked as a journalist, then as an editor and writer of illustrated reference books.

His first picture book for children, A Lark in the Ark, illustrated by Lynne Chapman, was published in 2008. Since then he has published over seventy titles, his most recent books including Octopus Shocktopus for Nosy Crow (illustrated by Steven Lenton and winner of the Teach Early Years picture book award 2020 as well as being shortlisted for the BookTrust Storytime prize and the Laugh Out Loud awards 2022); Dogs in Disguise for HarperCollins Children's Books (illustrated by John Bond); and The King’s Birthday Suit! for Bloomsbury (illustrated by Claire Powell). He lives in London with his wife Lucy Curtin, an actor and LAMDA teacher.
