= Anthony Browne (author) =

British writer and illustrator (born 1946)

Anthony Browne CBE
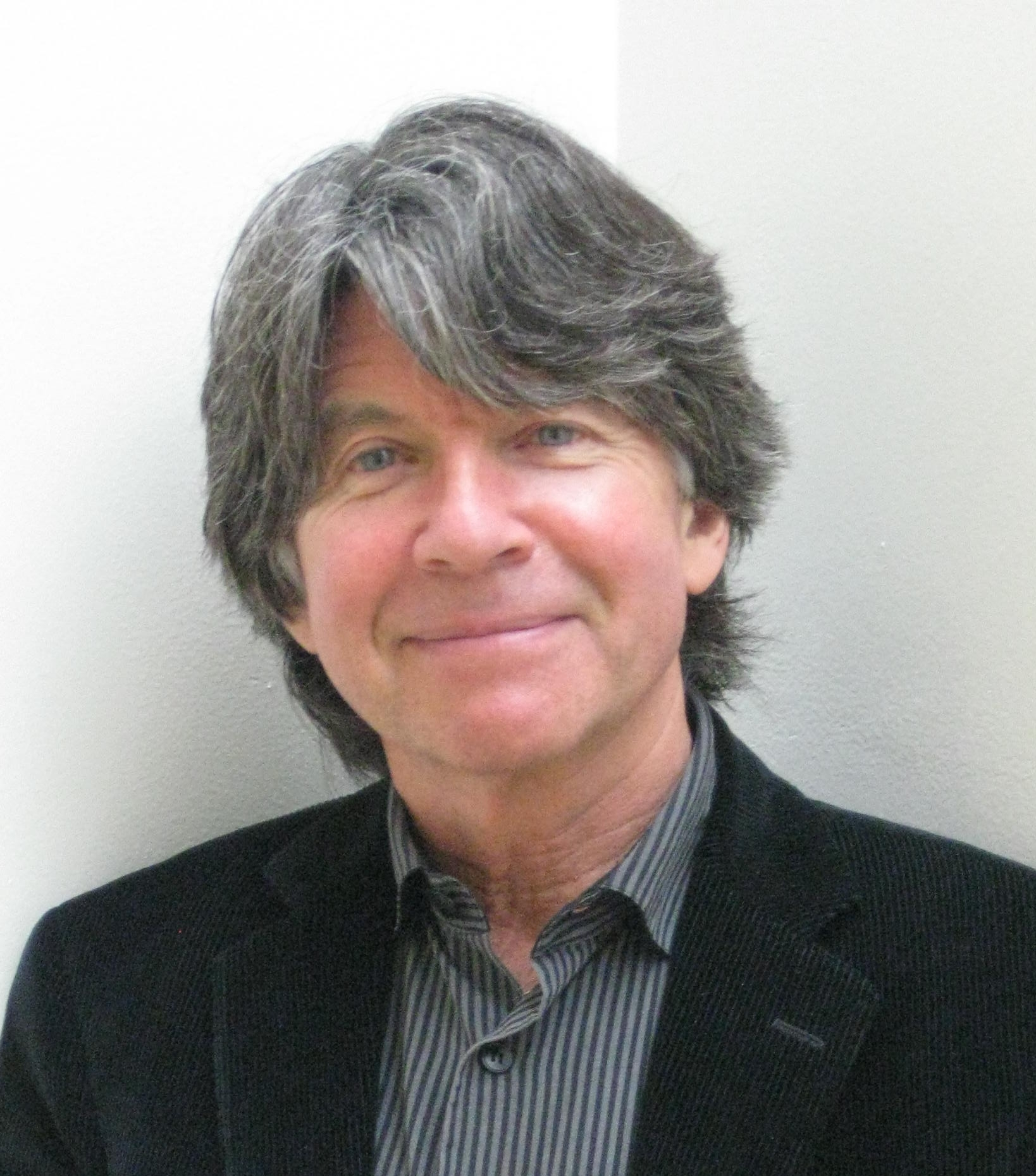
- Browne in 2010
- Born: Anthony Edward Browne; 11 September 1946 (age 80); Sheffield, Yorkshire, England
- Education: Leeds College of Art
- Occupations: Illustrator, writer
- Children: 2
- Writing career
- Period: 1976–present
- Genre: Children's picture books
- Notable work: Gorilla (1983)
- Notable awards: Kate Greenaway Medal; 1983, 1992; Hans Christian Andersen Award for Illustration; 2000
- Website: anthonybrownebooks.com

Anthony Edward Tudor Browne CBE (born 11 September 1946) is a British writer and illustrator of children's books, primarily picture books. Browne has written or illustrated more than fifty books, and received the Hans Christian Andersen Award in 2000. From 2009 to 2011, he was Children's Laureate.

Browne won two Kate Greenaway Medals from the Library Association, recognising the year's best children's book illustration. For the 50th anniversary of the Medal (1955–2005), a panel named his 1983 medalist Gorilla one of the top ten winning works, which comprised the ballot for a public election of the nation's favourite.

== Life and work ==
Browne was born on 11 September 1946 in Sheffield, Yorkshire, England. His parents, Jack and Doris May Browne, ran a pub called the Red Lion (now the Wyke Lion) at Hellfire Corner between Bradford and Huddersfield, in West Yorkshire, and Browne and his older brother Michael grew up there. As a young boy, Browne enjoyed art and used to draw with his father. He also played rugby and cricket. His career ambition was then to be a journalist, a cartoonist, or a boxer. He studied graphic design at Leeds College of Art, where he graduated in 1967.

When he finished school he took a job as a medical illustrator, producing detailed paintings of operations for Manchester Royal Infirmary. After three years, he moved on to design greeting cards for Gordon Fraser. He designed cards for five years before he started writing and illustrating his books.

Browne's debut book both as a writer and as an illustrator was Through the Magic Mirror, published by Hamish Hamilton in 1976. A Walk in the Park followed the next year and gained a cult following and Bear Hunt (1979) was more successful commercially. His breakthrough came with Gorilla, published by Julia MacRae in 1983, based on one of his greeting cards. For Gorilla, he won the Kate Greenaway Medal from the Library Association, recognizing the year's best children's book illustration by a British subject. He was a highly commended runner-up (Note: Today there are usually eight books on the Greenaway Medal shortlist. According to CCSU, some runners-up through 2002 up were Commended (from 1959) or Highly Commended (from 1974). There were 99 commendations of both kinds in 44 years; 31 high commendations in 29 years, including for Browne and two others in 1988, Browne alone for 2000. • No one has won three Greenaways. Among the fourteen illustrators with two Medals, Browne is one of seven with one book named to the top ten (1955–2005) and one of seven with at least one Highly Commended runner-up (1974–2002), led by Helen Oxenbury with four and Browne with two.) for an edition of Alice in Wonderland (1988), he won the 1992 Medal for Zoo and he was again highly commended for Willy's Pictures (2000).

Gorillas are frequently featured in Browne's books, as he has said he is fascinated by them. He was once asked to present a children's programme, while sitting in a cage of gorillas, and despite being badly bitten by one of them he completed the interview before being taken to hospital. his character "Willy" is said to be based on himself.

Browne and writer Annalena McAfee won the 1985 Deutscher Jugendliteraturpreis, Picture Book category, for Mein Papi, nur meiner! (The Visitors Who Came to Stay). He also thrice won the Kurt Maschler Award "Emil", which annually (1982 to 1999) recognized one British "work of imagination for children, in which text and illustration are integrated so that each enhances and balances the other." Browne was a winner for Gorilla (Julia MacRae Books, 1983), Alice's Adventure in Wonderland (MacRae, 1988) and Voices in the Park (Doubleday, 1998), as the illustrator of all three books and the writer of two.

In 2000, Browne was awarded the Hans Christian Andersen Medal, an international award given to an illustrator for their body of work. This prize is the highest honour a children's writer or illustrator can win and Browne was the first British illustrator to receive the award.

In 2001–2002, Browne took a job as writer and illustrator at Tate Britain, working with children using art as a stimulus to inspire visual literacy and creative writing activities. It was during this time that he conceived and produced The Shape Game (Doubleday, 2003).

In June 2009, Browne was appointed the sixth Children's Laureate (2009–2011), selected by a panel that former Poet Laureate Andrew Motion chaired.

Browne's books are translated into 26 languages and his illustrations have been exhibited in many countries, including the United States, Mexico, Venezuela, Colombia, France, Korea, Italy, Germany, the Netherlands, Japan, and Taiwan. He currently lives in Canterbury, Kent, England.

Browne was appointed Commander of the Order of the British Empire (CBE) in the 2021 New Year Honours for services to literature.

== Works ==
=== As writer and illustrator ===
- Through the Magic Mirror (Hamish Hamilton, 1976)
- A Walk in the Park (Hamilton, 1977)
- Bear Hunt (Hamilton, 1979)
- Look What I've Got! (Julia MacRae Books, 1980)
- Bear Goes To Town (Hamilton, 1982)
- Gorilla (MacRae, 1983) —winner of the Kate Greenaway Medal for illustration and the Emil
- Willy the Wimp (MacRae, 1984)
- Willy the Champ (MacRae, 1985)
- Piggybook (MacRae, 1986)
- I Like Books (MacRae, 1988)
- The Little Bear Book (Hamilton, 1988)
- A Bear-y Tale (Hamilton, 1989)
- Things I Like (MacRae, 1989)
- The Tunnel (MacRae, 1989)
- Changes (MacRae, 1990)
- Willy and Hugh (MacRae, 1991)
- Zoo (MacRae, 1992) —winner of the Greenaway Medal
- The Big Baby: a little joke (MacRae, 1993)
- Willy the Wizard (MacRae, 1995)
- Willy the Dreamer (Walker, 1997)
- Voices in the Park (Doubleday, 1998) —winner of the Emil
- My Dad (Doubleday, 2000) (first in the My Family Member series)
- Willy's Pictures (Walker, 2000) —highly commended for the Greenaway
- Anthony Browne Presents the Animal Fair: a spectacular pop-up (Walker, 2002)
- The Shape Game (MacRae, 2003)
- Into the Forest (MacRae, 2004)
- My Mum (Doubleday, 2005)
- Silly Billy (Walker, 2006)
- My Brother (Doubleday, 2007)
- Little Beauty (Walker, 2008)
- Me and You (Doubleday, 2011) —a retelling of The Story of the Three Bears in a contemporary setting
- Play the Shape Game (Walker, 2011)
- How Do You Feel? (Walker, 2011, ISBN 9781406330175)
- One Gorilla, A Counting Book (Walker, 2012)
- What If...? (Doubleday, 2013)
- Willy's Stories (Walker, 2014)
- Frida and Bear (Walker, 2015)
- Willy and the Cloud (Walker, 2016)
- Hide and Seek (Doubleday, 2017, ISBN 9780857534910)
- Our Girl (2020)

=== As illustrator ===
- Hansel and Gretel by Brothers Grimm (MacRae, 1981)
- The Visitors Who Came to Stay by Annalena McAfee (Hamilton, 1984) – winner of the 1985 German youth literature prize for picture books in its German-language translation retaining Browne's illustrations
- Knock, knock! Who's there? by Sally Grindley (Hamilton, 1985), picture book
- Kirsty Knows Best by Annalena McAfee (MacRae, 1987), picture book
- Alice's Adventures in Wonderland by Lewis Carroll (MacRae, 1988) – an edition of the 1865 classic, highly commended for the Greenaway and winner of the Emil
- Trail of Stones by Gwen Strauss (MacRae, 1990), picture book
- The Night Shimmy by Gwen Strauss (MacRae, 1991), picture book
- The Topiary Garden by Janni Howker (Hamilton, 1993), short stories published 1991
- Anthony Browne's King Kong (MacRae, 1994) – from the 1932 novelised story of King Kong
- The Daydreamer by Ian McEwan (New York: HarperCollins, 1994), novella
- Anthony Browne, Playing the Shape Game by Joe Browne (Doubleday, 2011), biography

== Notes ==
Cultural offices
| Preceded by Michael Rosen | Children's Laureate of the United Kingdom; 2009–2011 | Succeeded by Julia Donaldson |
