= My Family Member =

Illustrated children's book series

- Cover of the first book of the series
- My Dad; My Mum; My Brother; Our Girl
- Author: Anthony Browne
- Country: United Kingdom
- Language: English
- Published: 2000—2020

My Family Member or just My Family series is a four-part series of illustrated children's books, written and illustrated by Anthony Browne. The series is composed of My Dad (2000), My Mum (2005), My Brother (2007) and Our Girl (2020).

The book received translations into many languages.

The books follow a similar format—in the first three volumes, an unseen child is introducing and praising their respective family members; in the last volume, an adult family member is similarly praising their young daughter.

The series features many illustrations of human-animal hybrids, through which children associate stereotypical animal characteristics with human abilities and concepts. For example, in the first volume, the dad "eats like a horse, swims like a fish, is as strong as a gorilla", and so on. Consistency is achieved through continues use of the same characteristic clothing for the portrayed characters, as well as a unified linguistic and visual style throughout the entire four-volume series.

Browne noted that his memories about his family members were an important inspiration in creation of the series. The inspiration for the first book in the series, in particular, was the author's discovery of his father's gown which reminded him of his figure. Browne also noted that while the character of the dad is a bit silly and clownish, he was more cautious with portraying the mother figure, whom he tried to make more admirable instead.

== Reception ==
My Dad has been reviewed by several outlets. The reviewer for Kirkus Reviews praised the book as "a sweet-natured celebration of Dad in all his infinite variety" that "has family favorite written all over it", positively commenting on "warmly appealing, carefully composed pictures", although they criticized one joke revised for a newer (2001) edition of the book, about men being stereotypically inept with cleaning. The reviewer for Publishers Weekly likewise noted "well-measured doses of hyperbole, sentiment and humor" that result in an "endearing paean" to dads, praising also the book's "witty" and "sly" images.

Kirkus Reviews also reviewed the final installment, My Brother. The reviewer positively opined on the book, predicting that the readers "will enjoy the sly humor, cheerful hyperbole and attention to detail in the stylized illustrations", also appreciating contemporary language (such as the use of the word "cool") and cameo tie-ins to other works of Browne, concluding that the book "is energetic, heartwarming and a pleasure to read".

The first three books have been positively reviewed by the United States Board on Books for Young People (USBBY). The reviewer of My Dad opined that the book's humor would appeal to the young readers, while more nuanced references, such as to The Three Tenors, would amuse adults. A USBBY reviewer praised My Mum for being humorous, and called it a likely inspiration for youngsters to create "personal peans" to their mothers using the book as a style template. That reviewer also positively reviewed My Brother, remarking that imaginative illustrations "make this book fascinating, and infinitely re-readable", and concluded that the book is "a tribute to brotherly love".

My Mum was selected for the USBBY Outstanding International Books List in 2006.
