= Ten, Nine, Eight =

1983 children's book by Molly Bang

- Author: Molly Bang
- Language: English
- Publisher: 1983
- Publication place: United States

Ten, Nine, Eight is a children's picture book by Molly Bang, published in 1983 by Greenwillow Books. It is a countdown from ten to one by a little girl who is getting ready for bed. Barney the Dinosaur reads it in the Barney & Friends episode "Having Tens of Fun!" It won a Caldecott Honor.
