= Sandra Horn =

British writer living in Southampton

Sandra Ann Horn is a British writer living in Southampton. She is also a poet, storyteller and playwright.

== Career ==
Horn's first book for children was Tattybogle, about a happy scarecrow, published in 1995. This book was turned into a musical by Ruth Kenward. A sequel to the book was published in 2000, called The Tattybogle Tree.

Other books for children include Babushka, Nobody, Him and Me, Dandelion Wish and The Mud Maid.

Horn was a lecturer in psychology, and co-wrote Loss and Bereavement (with Sheila Payne and Marilyn Relf: 1999, Open University Press, ISBN 9780335201068) and Pain: Theory, Research and Intervention (with Marcus Munafo: 1997, McGraw Hill, ISBN 9780335196883). She took early retirement in order to spend time writing and publishing.

As of 2010 Horn was developing a Sitcom called The Sweete Sisters. A pilot episode received a rehearsed reading directed by Hugh Allison.

Her works The Moon Thieves, Tattybogle and Babushka have been arranged as musicals for performance by infant school children.

She founded the publishing house Clucket Press, along with her husband Niall.
