= Jez Alborough =

British author and illustrator of children's books

Jez Alborough (born 12 November 1959) is an English writer and illustrator of children's picture books that have been translated into at least 15 languages and have been recognized for numerous awards.

Albrough was born in Kingston upon Thames, Southwest London. After attending school, Albrough earned his degree at the Norwich School of Art, where he published his first book A Bun Dance. He then worked for the publication The Listener, where he published Dotty Definitions. When his talents as an illustrator were discovered by an outside publisher, he received an offer to write his first children's book Bare Bear, which was published in 1985. Alborough has been working as an independent author and illustrator since. He now lives in Richmond, London, with his Danish wife.

== Selected works ==
As of 24 October 2013, WorldCat reports These ten works most widely held in participating libraries.

- Martin's Mice (1988)
- Where's My Teddy (1992)
- It's the Bear (1994)
- Watch Out! Big Bro's Coming (1997)
- My Friend Bear (1998)
- Duck in the Truck (1999)
- Hug (2000)
- Fix-It Duck (Picture Lions, 2001) —a runner-up for the Greenaway Medal (won by Chris Riddell for Pirate Diary)
- Some Dogs Do (2003)
- Tall (2005)
- Yes (2006)
- Play (2016)
