= Caroline Binch =

English writer and illustrator

- Born: 1947 (age 78–79)
- Known for: Children's book illustrator

Caroline Binch (born 1947) is an English illustrator and writer of children's books.

== Career ==
Binch began working as a children's book illustrator in 1987, illustrating Therese Pouyanne's book Hippo. Since then, she has gone on to illustrate 23 books.

Binch attended Salford Technical College where she majored in graphic design.

She has been commended or highly commended for the Kate Greenaway Medal three times: for Gregory Cool in 1995, and Down by the River in 1997. She was also shortlisted for the Greenaway award with Silver Shoes in 2001. She was co-winner of the Nestlé Smarties Book Prize (age 0-5) for Hue Boy, which was also on the New York Times list of the ten best illustrated children's books that year, and has been twice short-listed for the Sheffield Children's Book Prize. Two of her books were listed in Seven Stories' "50 best culturally diverse children's books" from 1950 to 2015.

Her illustrations for the book Amazing Grace, especially popular in the United States, has won the "Certificate of Excellence" from Parenting, "The Parents Choice Award" and "Best Children's Book Honour Award" from Waldenbooks, and has been listed as "One of the Best Illustrated Children's Books of the Year" from The New York Times. She was also nominated for the Kate Greenaway Medal for her illustrations on Amazing Grace. It was followed by three sequels, all illustrated by Binch. Kirkus Reviews wrote that Binch was able to capture Grace's character "with her detailed, realistic watercolors."

Amazing Grace, first published in 1991, has been described as "ground-breaking" because it featured one of the first black heroines in a successful picture book. Binch has gone on to be recognised for her multicultural work, according to Books for Keeps. Crown Jewels was her first "black cover" and then came commissions for cover art for books by Rosa Guy. She has illustrated various books with Caribbean themes, including Look Back! and Gregory Cool, which Binch hopes will help children in different countries "identify with the similarities between them", and has been a guest of the Trinidad and Tobago National Library and Information System. Binch worked with West Indian families in order to create the illustrations for Amazing Grace and its sequels.

The author Mary Hoffman has said part of the success of the books about Grace "comes from Caroline Binch’s beautiful naturalistic pictures. She brought Grace and her family to life in a way that has helped to keep her popular for so many years." The illustrator, author and critic Joanna Carey described Binch's technique and style like this: "Planning and casting her books like a film director, she takes a vast number of black-and-white photos from which she creates her meticulous watercolour illustrations. She has a sparkling fluid technique, perfect tonal values, brilliantly consistent characterisation, scrupulous attention to detail" leading to a "resulting realism". When Carey interviewed Binch in 1998 she described her as "Well-known [...] for her superb illustrations".

== Works ==
- Petar’s Song (2003) by Pratima Mitchell
- Starring Grace (1996) by Marry Hoffman
- New Born (1999) by Kathy Henderson
- A Pack of Liars (1998) by Anne Fine
- Down by the River by Grace Hallworth
- Grace and Family (1995) by Mary Hoffman
- Hue Boy (1993) by Rita Phillips Mitchell
- Rosa’s Grandfather Sings Again (1993) by Leon Rosselson
- The Hell Hound of Hooley Street (1993) by Jon Blake
- Billy the Great (1992) by Rosa Guy
- Amazing Grace (1991) by Mary Hoffman
- Come into My Tropical Garden (1990) by Grace Nichols
- Taste of Blackberries (1990) by Doris Buchanan Smith
- Fibs (1990) by Dick Cate
- Flames (1989) by Dick Cate
- Close to Home: Say No is Not Enough (1989) by Oralee Wachter
- Foxcover (1988) by Dick Cate
- Ghost Dog (1987) by Dick Cate
- Twisters (1987) by Dick Cate
- The Private World of Leroy Brown (1987) by Rhodri Jones
- No More Secrets for Me (1985) by Oralee Wachter
- Paris Pee Wee and Big Dog (1985) by Rosa Guy
- Hippo (1983) by Therese Pouyanne
