= Richard Platt (writer) =

British writer

- Born: April 15, 1953 (age 73); Northumberland, England
- Writing career
- Genre: Children's books
- Notable work: Pirate Diary: The Journal of Jake Carpenter

Richard Platt (born 15 April 1953) is a British writer of nonfiction and information books and multimedia works, primarily for children.

Platt was born in Northumberland, England. He started writing when aged 27 with how-to articles and books about photography. By 1992 he had begun writing non-fiction books for children, initially collaborating with Stephen Biesty in a successful series that capitalized on the illustrator's facility for cross-sectional drawings. Since then, Richard Platt has gone on to complete some 100 books for UK publishers Oxford University Press, Kingfisher, Dorling Kindersley and Walker Books (Candlewick Press in the U.S.). Most have been for children and young people, though he also writes books for adults on maritime themes, especially smuggling.

== Diary series ==
One of Platt's famous books is Pirate Diary: The Journal of Jake Carpenter, illustrated by Chris Riddell (Walker, 2001), a 64-page first-person journal. He won the annual Blue Peter Book Award in category Best Book with Facts and Riddell won the annual Kate Greenaway Medal for children's book illustration, the first "information book" to win since 1975. Platt, Riddell, and Walker had inaugurated the Diary series in 1999 with Castle Diary: The Journal of Tobias Burgess, Page, which Platt calls it "my first attempt at fiction". Riddell's work was highly commended for the Greenaway Medal and it was a commercial success. Walker markets the 2011 matching set as "nonfiction".

Pirate Diary is the story of an apprentice sailor impressed by pirates to serve as cabin boy. He sees the good, the bad and the ugly, which educates the reader on historical issues of piracy. That is consistent with most of Platt's books, except for the first-person fictionalisation.

Platt continued the series of 64-page first-person journals with Walker and illustrator David Parkins. After Egyptian Diary: The Journal of Nakht (2005) and Roman Diary: The Journal of Iliona of Mytilini, who was captured and sold as a slave in Rome, AD 107 (2009), he calls Roman Diary the "fourth and final book in the Diary series".

Each Diary was published in a U.S. hardcover edition by Candlewick Press within the calendar year.
