= Helen Cooper (illustrator) =

British illustrator and author (born 1963)

- Born: 1963 (age 62–63); London, UK
- Occupations: Freelance author and illustrator
- Years active: 1987–present
- Children: Pandora
- Website: helencooperbooks.co.uk

Helen Sonia Cooper (born 1963 in London) is a British illustrator and an author of children's literature. She grew up in Cumbria, where she practiced literature and piano playing. She currently lives in Oxford. According to the author's website, her books have been translated into 30 languages worldwide.

Cooper has twice been awarded the Kate Greenaway Medal from the Chartered Institute of Library and Information Professionals (CILIP), recognising the year's best children's book illustration by a British subject. She won for The Baby Who Wouldn't Go To Bed in 1996, which she wrote and illustrated. In 1998 she won for Pumpkin Soup, which she also wrote and illustrated. They were consecutive projects for her.

Beside winning the two Greenaway Medals (no one has won three), Cooper made the shortlist for The Bear Under the Stairs (Doubleday, 1993) and Tatty Ratty (Doubleday, 2001).

As well as her solo picture books, Cooper writes picture book texts for other illustrators, and also illustrates her own middle grade fiction - most recently, The Taming of the Cat published by Faber and Faber in the UK.

WorldCat reports that Pumpkin Soup is her work most widely held in participating libraries.

== Personal life ==
Cooper was married to Ted Dewan, a fellow children's book author and illustrator and they have one daughter. They are now divorced.

== Works ==
Cooper is both the writer and the illustrator of many published picture books and a set of four "mini-books" about toy animals (1994), later packaged in English, Spanish, and Catalan languages as Toy Tales (1999). She has illustrated a few books by other writers and written one book with another illustrator, as noted.

- Kit and the Magic Kite (1987)
- Lucy and the Eggwitch (1989), by Moira Miller
- Solomon's Secret (1989), by Saviour Pirotta
- Ella and the Rabbit (1990)
- Christmas Stories for the Very Young (1990), a collection edited by Sally Grindley
- The Owl and the Pussycat (1991), an edition of the classic by Edward Lear
- Chestnut Grey (1993)
- The Bear Under the Stairs (1993)
- The House Cat (1993)
- Toy Tales (1994; 1999 omnibus under one title)
  - The tale of bear
  - The tale of frog
  - The tale of duck
  - The tale of pig
- Little Monster Did It! (1995)
- The Boy Who Wouldn't Go To Bed (1996)
- Pumpkin Soup (1998)
- Tatty Ratty (2001)
- Sandmare (Corgi, 2001), written by Cooper and illustrated by Ted Dewan
- A Pipkin of Pepper (2003 or 2004) – sequel to Pumpkin Soup
- Delicious (2006) – sequel to Pumpkin Soup
- Dog Biscuit (2008)
- The Hippo at the end of the Hall (2017) - a children's illustrated middle grade novel.
- Saving The Butterfly (2022) - Written by Cooper and illustrated by Gill Smith.
- 'The Taming of the Cat' - a children's illustrated middle grade novel, written and illustrated by Cooper.
