= Kurt Maschler Award =

Defunct British literary award

The Kurt Maschler Award (1982 to 1999) was a British literary award which annually recognised one "work of imagination for children, in which text and illustration are integrated so that each enhances and balances the other." Winning authors and illustrators received £1000 and a bronze figurine called the "Emil". The Award was founded by Kurt Maschler, best known as the publisher of Emil and the Detectives by Erich Kästner (1929). By the time of its discontinuation after the 1999 publications, it was administered by BookTrust and Tom Maschler, a British publisher and the son of the founder. At that time, it was announced in December of the publication year.

== Winners ==
Seven of the 18 winning works were written and illustrated by one person, including two by Anthony Browne. As an illustrator, Browne won three awards (but five Emils overall), and Helen Oxenbury won two. Each won for work on an edition of Alice's Adventures in Wonderland by Lewis Carroll (1865). Browne and Carroll were the only authors of two winning works.

Winners of the Kurt Maschler Award
Year	Author	Illustrator	Title	Publisher
1982	Angela Carter (ed. and translator)	Michael Foreman	Sleeping Beauty and other favourite fairy tales	V. Gollancz
1983	Anthony Browne	Browne	Gorilla	Julia MacRae
1984	John Burningham	Burningham	Granpa	J. Cape
1985	Ted Hughes (1968)	Andrew Davidson	The Iron Man	Faber
1986	Allan Ahlberg	Janet Ahlberg	The Jolly Postman	Heinemann
1987	Charles Causley	Charles Keeping	Jack the Treacle Eater	Macmillan
1988	Lewis Carroll (1865)	Anthony Browne	Alice's Adventures in Wonderland	Julia MacRae
1989	Martin Waddell	Barbara Firth	The Park in the Dark	Walker
1990	Quentin Blake	Blake	All Join In	J. Cape
1991	Colin McNaughton	McNaughton	Have You Seen who's just moved in next door to us?	Walker
1992	Raymond Briggs	Briggs	The Man	Julia MacRae
1993	Karen Wallace	Mike Bostock	Think of an Eel	Walker
1994	Trish Cooke	Helen Oxenbury	So Much	Walker
1995	Kathy Henderson	Patrick Benson	The Little Boat	Walker
1996	Babette Cole	Cole	Drop Dead	J. Cape
1997	William Mayne	Jonathan Heale	Lady Muck	Heinemann
1998	Anthony Browne	Browne	Voices in the Park	Doubleday
1999	Lewis Carroll (1865)	Helen Oxenbury	Alice's Adventures in Wonderland	Walker

The first two Kurt Maschler Award winners and the final winner also received the annual Kate Greenaway Medal from the CILIP, which recognises the year's best children's book illustration by a British subject. Among these, the 1983 winner, Gorilla, illustrated by Anthony Browne, and the 1999 winner, Helen Oxenbury's edition of Alice in Wonderland, were named two of the top ten Greenaway-winning works (1955–2005) during that Medal's 50-year celebration in 2007. Three other Maschler winners were highly commended runners-up for the Greenaway Medal, a distinction awarded roughly annually at the time: Browne's edition of Alice, Oxenbury for So Much, and Patrick Benson for The Little Boat.

== See also ==
- Caldecott Medal
- Kate Greenaway Medal
- Mother Goose Award
