= Libby Hathorn =

Australian children's writer

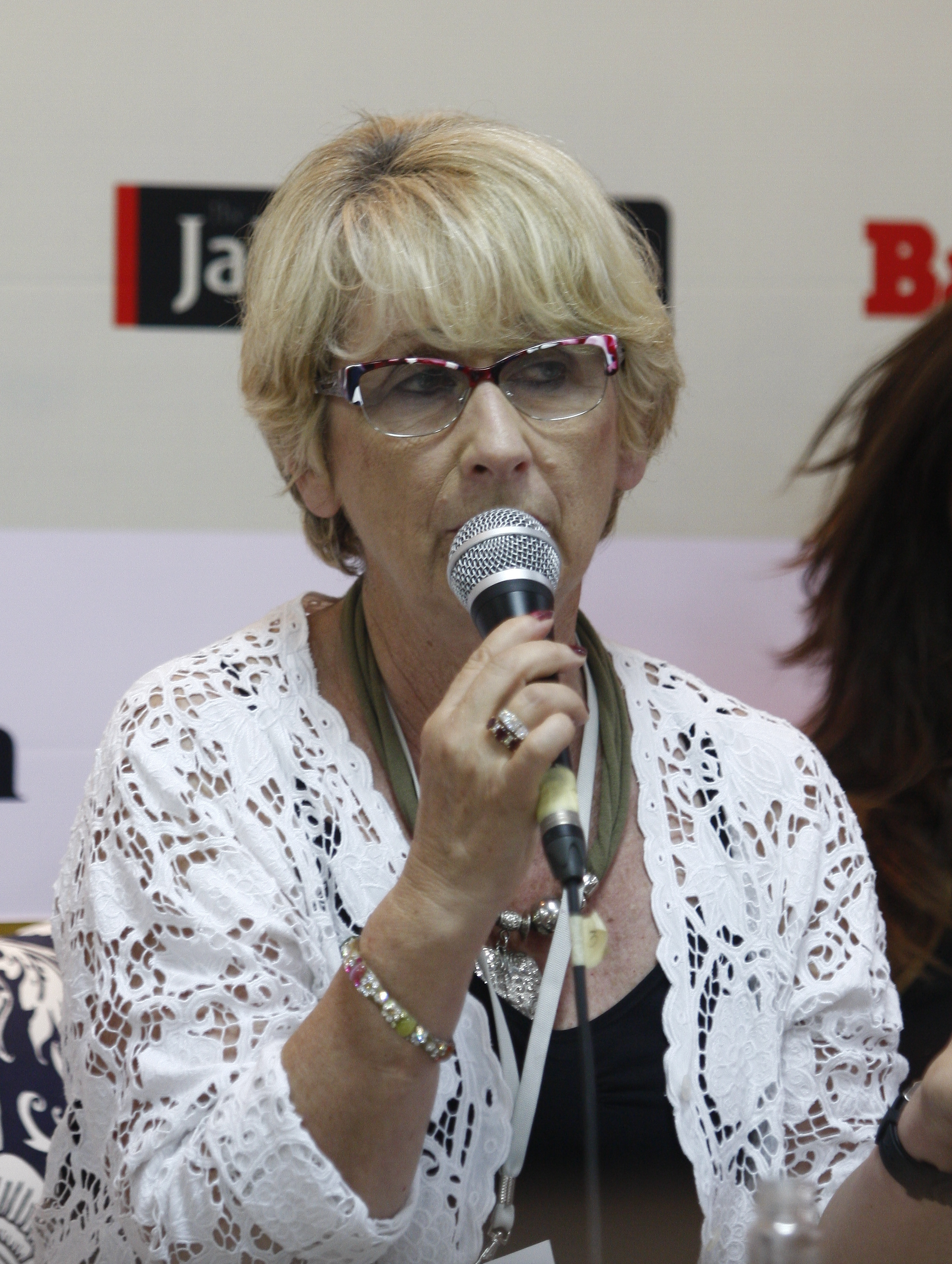
- Hathorn at Ubud Writers & Readers Festival 2012
- Born: Elizabeth Helen Hathorn; 1943 (age 82–83); Newcastle, New South Wales, Australia
- Occupations: Author, poet, playwright
- Writing career
- Notable works: Thunderwith, No Never! A Cautionary Tale, Way Home
- Notable awards: Centenary Medal (2001), Alice Award (2014), Asher Peace Prize (2017), ABIA Pixie O'Harris Award (2022)
- Website: libbyhathorn.com

Elizabeth Helen Hathorn (born 1943) is an Australian writer for children, and a poet who works with schools, institutions and communities. She has received many awards for her books, some of which have been translated into several languages. In 2001 she was awarded a Centenary Medal for her contribution to children's theatre. In 2014 she was awarded the Alice Award for her contribution to Australian literature. In 2017 she won the Asher Peace Prize and in 2022 the ABIA Pixie O'Harris Award for excellence and dedication to children's literature.

== Early life ==
Hathorn was born in Newcastle, New South Wales. She attended Balmain Teacher's College (soon part of the New South Wales Institute of Technology) and worked as a teacher and librarian from 1965 to 1981. She has attained a Master of Arts, Macquarie University.

== Career ==
Hathorn's stories have been translated into several languages and adapted for stage and screen. Her work has won honours in Australia as well as in the United States, United Kingdom and the Netherlands. She was awarded a Centenary Medal in 2001 "for service to Australian society in writing for theatre for young people", and the Alice Award from the NSW Society of Women Writers in 2014. The latter is a national award for a woman writer "who for her written work has made a distinguished and long term contribution to Australian literature".

Hallmark Hall of Fame has made a movie of Hathorn's best-selling young adult novel, Thunderwith, re-titled The Echo of Thunder. It starred Judy Davis, who was nominated for an Emmy Award in the US for her performance as Gladwyn. In 2004 her children's picture storybook, Sky Sash So Blue, published in the United States, was performed as an opera in Birmingham, Alabama. Previously, Grandma's Shoes was performed as an opera by Opera Australia and Theatre of Image. Libby was awarded an AWGIE for the libretto based on this picture storybook, in 2001. Her CDROM series Weirdstop won the Australian Interactive Media Industry Awards (AIMIA), 2004 as Best Children's Product; and in 2005 the New South Wales Society of Women Writers' Bi-annual Award for Older Readers. Wonderstop won the Energy Australia National Trust Heritage Award (Education) 2007. Concerned about child homelessness, Hathorn wrote Way Home with illustrations by Greg Rogers which won the Kate Greenaway Award in the UK and a Parent's Choice in the USA. It was later produced as a play by Barking Gecko in WA. Recent children's picture books include 'No Never; a cautionary tale' written with daughter Lisa Hathorn, a CBCA Book of the Year, Younger Readers, 2021; Miss Franklin (Hachette) Winner, SWW Biennial Children's Book Award, 2019; Outside (Little Hare) A CBCA Notable Book 2014, being developed as a children's opera with Australian composer Elena Katz Chernin; and A Soldier, A Dog and a Boy illustrated by Phil Lesnie, (Hachette) a CBCA Notable Book 2017 and Asher Award winner 2017.

Hathorn has lectured part-time in Master of Arts, Creative Writing at Sydney University and is a frequent speaker at conferences and festivals. As an Australia Day Ambassador, she has travelled to country towns each year where she talks about the importance of Australian literature. Her novels include, 'Thunderwith (Hachette, first published Heinemann, 1989);'Rift',(Hodder, 1998) (Letters to a Princess, (ABC books, 2007); historical novel, Georgiana: Woman of Flowers (Hachette Livre); a play based on her picture storybook, The Tram to Bondi Beach (Currency Press, 2008); and Fire Song (ABC/HarperCollins, 2009) which was highly commended in the inaugural Prime Minister's Literary Awards. Her Anzac novel Eventual Poppy Day (HarperCollins, 2015) short-listed for the Society of Women Writers Biennial Awards, 2016.

Poetry is an abiding passion for her, and many of her works are either written in poetry or inspired by poetry. She has devised and worked on an arts project entitled "100 Views" in several schools, both in Australia and internationally celebrating community through poetry and a festival; Power Poetry with the Powerhouse Museum; and video conferencing poetry workshops with the NSW State Library. In 2010 she compiled The ABC Book of Australian Poetry: A Treasury for Young People with artwork by Cassandra Allen (ABC/HarperCollins)and in 2013 she published Women's Work: A Collection of Contemporary Women's Poetry (Pax Press). Some of her recent picture books A Baby for Loving, illustrated by Tamsin Ainslie, and Outside, illus. Ritva Voularis (Hardie Grant/Egmont, Little Hare, 2014); and Butterfly, we're expecting you illustrated by Lisa Stewart (Hachette, 2017) are written in verse. During 2016 she worked with the NSW State Library who produced an Australian Poetry Series she scripted and directed on the lives of CJ Dennis, Henry Lawson and Dorothea Mackellar, to be launched 2018. In 2021 she produced an animation about a hearing impaired child 'What Rosie Hears' (Pax Productions and Mental Image, 2021.)

No! Never! won the Children's Book of the Year Award: Early Childhood in 2021.

== Bibliography ==
Picture Storybooks

- Mother Earth (2023) illus Christina Booth
- Best Cat, The Est Cat (2021) illus Rosie Handley
- A Tram to Bondi Beach (2021) 40th Anniversary Edition illus Jule Vivas
- No Never! A Cautionary Tale (2020) Co-author Lisa Hathorn
- Our Baby (2019) illus Tamsin Ainslie
- Miss Franklin (2019) illus Phil Lesnie
- Butterfly we're expecting you (2017) illus Lisa Stewart
- A Soldier, a Dog and a Boy (2016) illus Phil Lesnie
- Incredibilia (2016) illus Gaye Chapman
- Outside (2014) illus Ritva Voutila
- A Baby for Loving (2014) illus Tamsin Ainslie
- Sangita's Singing (2012) illus. Bandana Tulachan
- A Boy Like Me (2012) illus. Bruce Whatley
- I Love You Book (2011) illus. Heath McKenzie
- Zahara's Rose (2009) illus. Doris Unger
- The Great Big Animal Ask (2004) illus. Anna Pignataro
- Over the Moon (2003) illus. Caroline Magerl
- The Wishing Cupboard (2002) illus. Libby Stanley
- The River (2001) illus. Stanley Wong
- The Gift (2000) illus. Greg Rogers
- Grandma's Shoes (1994) illus. Elivia & (2000) illus. Caroline Magerl
- Magical Ride (1999) illus. Gary Fleming
- Sky Sash So Blue (1999) illus. Benny Andrews
- The Wonder Thing (1995) illus. Peter Gouldthorpe
- Way Home (1994) illus. Greg Rogers
- Stuntumble Monday (1989) illus. Melissa Webb
- The Garden of the World (1989) illus. Tricia Oktober
- Freya's Fantastic Surprise (1988) illus. Sharon Thompson
- The Tram to Bondi Beach (1981) illus. Julie Vivas
- Lachlan's Walks (1980) illus. Sandra Laroche
- Stephen's Tree (1979) illus. Sandra Laroche

Junior Novels

- Caravan Kids (2006)
- Okra and Acacia: The Story of the Wattle Pattern Plate (2002)
- The Extraordinary Magics of Emma McDade (1989)
- Love Me Tender (1992)
- The Lenski Kids and Dracula (1992)
- What a Star! (1994)
- Looking Out for Sampson (1987)
- So Who Needs Lotto (1991)
- Jezza Sez (1990)
- Paolo's Secret (1985)
- All About Anna (1980)
- A Face in the Water (2000)
- Friends and Secrets (1985)

Young Adult Novels

- Eventual Poppy Day (2015)
- Fire Song (2009)
- Georgiana: Woman of Flowers (2008)
- Letters to a Princess (2007)
- Volcano Boy (2001)
- The Painter (2000)
- Ghoststop, Book 1: Double Sorrow (1999)
- Ghoststop, Book 2: Twice the Ring of Fire (1999)
- Ghoststop, Book 3: For Love to Conquer All (1999)
- The Spirited Boy (1998)
- Rift (1998)
- Chrysalis (1997)
- The Climb (1996)
- Feral Kid (1994)
- Valley Under the Rock (1993)
- The Blue Dress (1991)
- Thunderwith (1989)
- Who? (1992)
- Dear Venny, Dear Saffron (1999)

Poetry

- Coastal Poetry, From Yarra Bay to Watson's Bay (2023) co-author Elizabeth Cummings
- Women's Work (2013)

The ABC Book of Australian Poetry: A Treasury for Young People(2010)

- Vietnam Reflections (2010) illus. Leon Coward
- Heard Singing (1998)
- Talks with My Skateboard (1995) illus. Matt Mawson

Digital Media

- What Rosie Hears (2021) Hathorn Pax Productions and Mental Image Animation. Illus Bethany Macdonald, Music Elena Kats-Chernin
- Wonderstop: The Adventures of Bodge and Widge (2005)
- Coolstop (2004)
- Weirdstop (2003)
- The Wishing Cupboard (1997)

Film

- 100 Views Kathmandu Mitraata Foundation: Film maker Tesring Rhita Sherpa Nepal (2020)
- Film Libby Hathorn's Poets of Australia -Henry Lawson: Dorothea Mackellar: CJ Dennis. State Library, NSW (2017) Film maker
- The Echo of Thunder (1998)
- Looking Out for Sampson (ABC 1990 archives) short movie

Theatre and Opera

- Incredibilia (2024) Director Kim Carpenter; State Library NSW and Riverside Theatre, Parramatta
- Way Home Barking Gecko Theatre Company, WA
- Songs with My Skateboard (1996) comp. Stephen Lalor, NSW Performing Arts Unit
- Grandma's Shoes (2000) comp. Graeme Koehne, Opera Australia and Theatre of Image
- Sky Sash So Blue (2004, 2005) comp. Phillip Ratliffe, Alabama USA
- Tram to Bondi Beach (2006) Randwick Town Hall, Sydney
- Georgiana: Woman of Flowers (2009) Parade Theatre

As Collator

- The ABC Book of Australian Poetry (2010)
