= Hampshire Book Awards =

Annual children's book awards

The Hampshire Book Awards are an annual series of literary awards given to works of children's literature. The awards are run by Hampshire County Council's School Library Service.

There are four awards: Hampshire Book Award, Hampshire Illustrated Book Award, Hampshire Picture Book Award and Hampshire Information Book Award.

== Hampshire Book Award ==
The Hampshire Book Award is given to works of children's literature published in paperback during the previous year. Around June every year, the final is held and selected Year 8 students from schools across Hampshire attend it in order to vote for the winning book. A celebration event for the award is held in October, and where possible, the winning author is invited to attend.

Winners and shortlists

- 2023 When the World was Ours by Liz Kessler
  - We Were Wolves by Jason Cockcroft
  - When I See Blue by Lily Bailey
  - The Boy Behind the Wall by Maximillian Jones
  - Rebel Skies by Ann Sei Lin
  - Once Upon a Fever by Angharad Walker
- 2022 Ground Zero by Alan Gratz
  - Cardboard Cowboys by Brian Conaghan
  - The Five Clues (Don’t Doubt the Rainbow) by Anthony Kessel
  - Giften by Leyla Suzan
  - Black Brother, Black Brother by Jewell Parker
  - Rhodes Tsunami Girl by Julian Sedgwick
- 2021 The Invincible Summer of Juniper Jones by Daven McQueen
  - Where the World turns Wild by Nicola Penfold
  - No Fixed Address by Susan Nielsen
  - Unstoppable by Dan Freedman
  - The Last Paper Crane by Kerry Drewery
  - Allies by Alan Gratz
- 2020 Outwalkers by Fiona Shaw
  - Lost by Eve Ainsworth
  - Earth Swarm by Tim Hall
  - Nothing but the Truth by Dick Lehr
  - Slick by M.M. Vaughan
  - Jemima Small Versus the Universe by Tamsin Winter
- 2019 Shell by Paula Rawsthorne
  - Things a Bright Girl Can Do by Sally Nicholls
  - Satellite by Nick Lake
  - The Extinction Trials by S. M. Wilson
  - Scarecrow by Danny Weston
  - Refugee by Alan Gratz
- 2018 Instructions of a Second Hand Heart by Tamsyn Murray
  - A Dangerous Crossing by Jane Mitchell
  - The Island at the End of Everything by Kiran Millwood Hargrave
  - Between the Lies by Cathy McPhail
  - Fir by Sharon Gosling
  - A Seven-Letter Word by Kim Slater
- 2017 River of Ink by Helen Dennis
  - My Name's Not Friday by Jon Walter
  - The Bubble Boy by Stewart Foster
  - Island by Nicky Singer, illustrated by Chris Riddell
  - Night Vision by Ella West
  - Railhead by Philip Reeve
- 2016 Looking at the Stars by Jo Cotterill
  - Winterkill by Kate A Boorman
  - Apple and Rain by Sarah Crossan
  - Devil You Know by Cathy MacPhail
  - The Boundless by Kenneth Oppel
  - Smart by Kim Slater
- 2015 The Screaming Staircase by Jonathan Stroud
  - Captain by Sam Angus
  - Ghost Hawk by Susan Cooper
  - Thirteen by Tom Hoyle
  - Counting by 7s by Holly Goldberg Sloan
  - The Last Minute by Eleanor Updale
- 2014 Hostage by Chris Bradford
  - After Tomorrow by Gillian Cross
  - Far Rockaway by Charlie Fletcher
  - Chasing the Dark by Sam Hepburn
  - A Tangle of Traitors by FE Higgins
  - Wonder by RJ Palacio
- 2013 My Sister Lives on the Mantelpiece by Annabel Pitcher
  - Cracks by Caroline Green
  - Department 19 by Will Hill
  - All Fall Down by Sally Nicholls
  - Burn Mark by Laura Powell
  - Gladiator by Simon Scarrow
- 2012 Half Brother by Kenneth Oppel
  - Burning Secrets by Clare Chambers
  - Outlaw by Stephen Davies
  - Reckless by Cornelia Funke
  - Theodore Boone: Young Lawyer by John Grisham
  - Angel by L.A. Weatherly
- 2011 Time Riders by Alex Scarrow
  - Diary of a Wimpy Vampire by Tim Collins
  - Halo by Zizou Corder
  - Two Good Thieves by Daniel Finn
  - Moster Repuplic by Ben Horton
  - Young Sherlock Holmes: Death Cloud by Andrew Lane
- 2010 Hunger Games by Suzanne Collins
  - Dot Robot by Jason Bradbury
  - The Devil's Kiss by Sarwat Chadda
  - Bang Bang You're Dead by Narinder Dhami
  - The Graveyard Book by Neil Gaiman
  - Medusa Project: The Set-Up by Sophie McKenzie
- 2009 Dogfight by Craig Simpson
  - Foundling (Monster Blood Tattoo) by D.M. Cornish
  - Dragonfly by Julia Golding
  - Between Two Seas by Marie-Louise Jensen
  - Crusade by Elizabeth Laird
  - Outcast by Michelle Paver
- 2008 Skulduggery Pleasant by Derek Landy
  - The Boy in the Striped Pyjamas by John Boyne
  - Nathan Fox: Dangerous Times by L. Brittney
  - School's Out Forever by James Patterson
  - H.I.V.E by Mark Walden
  - Kat Got Your Tongue by Lee Weatherly
- 2007 Percy Jackson and the Lightning Thief by Rick Riordan
  - Ellen's People by Dennis Hamley
  - Evil Star by Anthony Horowitz
  - Peter Raven Under Fire by Michael Molloy
  - CHERUB: Divine Madness by Robert Muchamore
  - The Devil's Footsteps by E.E. Richardson
- 2006 The Spook's Apprentice by Joseph Delaney
  - Merrow by Louise Cooper
  - The Heaven Shop by Deborah Ellis
  - Blood Pressure by Alan Gibbons
  - Mudlark by John Sedden
  - Ruby Tanya by Robert Swindells
- 2005 Private Peaceful by Michael Morpurgo
  - Unique by Alison Allen-Grey
  - Boy2Girl by Terence Blacker
  - Iqbal by Francesco D'Adamo
  - Horace by Chris d'Lacey
  - The Voyage of the Snake Lady by Theresa Tomlinson
- 2004 A Little Piece of Ground by Elizabeth Laird
  - Trollogy by Steve Barlow
  - Fat Boy Swim by Catherine Forde
  - Another Me by Catherine MacPhail
  - Keeper by Mal Peet
  - Child X by Lee Weatherly
- 2003 Skeleton Key by Anthony Horowitz
  - Exodus by Julie Bertagna
  - Nightland by Robert Dodds
  - Stella by Catherine Johnson
  - Mortal Engines by Philip Reeve
  - Match of Death by James Riordan

== Hampshire Illustrated Book Award ==
The Hampshire Illustrated Book Award is an annual award given to illustrated works of children's literature. The award is judged by children in Year 5 and run by Hampshire County Council's School Library Service. The shortlist is announced in October each year, and the winner in December. An award ceremony is held in March the following year.

Winners and shortlists

- 2022 The Barnabus Project by The Fan Brothers
  - Ride the Wind by Nicola Davies and illustrated by Salvatore Rubbino
  - Mayor Bunny’s Chocolate Town written and illustrated by Elys Dolan
  - The Bear in the Stars written and illustrated by Alexis Snell
  - The Wolf’s Secret written by Myriam Dahman & Nicola Digard, illustrated by Júlia Sardà
  - Alice’s Adventures in Wonderland retold by Jeanne Willis and illustrated by Ross Collins
- 2021 The Couch Potato written by Jory John, illustrated by Pete Oswald
  - Starbird written and illustrated by Sharon King-Chai
  - Bear Island written and illustrated by Matthew Cordell
  - Hike written and illustrated by Pete Oswald
  - Last written and illustrated by Nicola Davies
  - I am Every Good Thing written by Derrick Barnes and illustrated by Gordon C. James
- 2020 A Christmas Carol retold by Tony Mitton, illustrated by Mike Redman
  - The Dam written by David Almond, illustrated by Levi Pinfold
  - The Day War Came written by Nicola Davies, illustrated by Rebecca Cobb
  - The Last Tree written and illustrated by Emily Haworth-Booth
  - Once Upon a Wild Wood written and illustrated by Chris Riddell
  - #Goldilocks written by Jeanne Willis, illustrated by Tony Ross
- 2019 The Bad Seed written by Jory John, illustrated by Pete Oswald
  - The Wolf, the Duck & The Mouse written by Marc Barnett, illustrated by Jon Klassen
  - Storm Whale written by Sarah Brennan, illustrated by Jane Tanner
  - Cinnamon written by Neil Gaiman, illustrated by Divya Srinivasan
  - King who banned the Dark written and illustrated by Emily Haworth-Booth
  - Little Mouse and the Red Wall written and illustrated by Britta Teckentrup
- 2018 An Alphabet of Stories written and illustrated by Oliver Jeffers
  - Kevin written and illustrated by Rob Biddulph
  - King of the Sky written by Nicola Davies, illustrated by Laura Carlin
  - Peace Lily written by Hilary Robinson, illustrated by Martin Impey
  - Pigeon P.I written and illustrated by Meg McLaren
  - The Happy Prince illustrated and adapted by Maisie Paradise Shearing
- 2017 Where the Bugaboo Lives by Sean Taylor and Neal Layton
  - Imaginary Fred by Eoin Colfer and Oliver Jeffers
  - Finding Winnie by Lindsay Mattick and Sophie Blackall
  - Ossiri and the Bala Mengro by Richard O'Neill and Katharine Quarmby
  - Pet Dragon by Mark Robertson and Sally Symes
  - Lucinda Belinda Melinda McCool by Jeanne Willis and Tony Ross
- 2016 The Cat, The Dog, Little Red, The Exploding Eggs, The Wolf and Grandma’s Wardrobe by Diane Fox and Christyan Fox.
  - The Three Ninja Pigs written by David Bedford, illustrated by Becka Mo
  - I am Henry Finch written by Alexis Deacon, illustrated by Viviane Schwarz
  - Footpath Flowers written by JonArno Lawson, illustrated by Sydney Smith
  - Greenling written and illustrated by Levi Pinfold
  - Can I Build Another Me? written and illustrated by Shinsuke Yoshitake
- 2015 Winter's Child by Angela McAllister and Grahame Baker-Smith
  - The Promise written by Nicola Davies, illustrated by Laura Carlin
  - The Clockwork Dragon written by Jonathan Emmett, illustrated by Elys Dolan
  - Hermelin, the Detective Mouse written and illustrated by Mini Grey
  - Lucky written and illustrated by David MacIntosh
  - Mr Wuffles! written and illustrated by David Wiesner
- 2014 The Day the Crayons Quit by Drew Daywalt and Oliver Jeffers
  - The Story of Jemmy Button written and illustrated by Alix Barzelay, Jennifer Uman and Valerio Vidali
  - Where The Poppies Now Grow by Hilary Robinson and Martin Impey
  - Journey by Aaron Becker
  - Jemmy Button by Valerio Vidali
  - Weasels by Elys Dolan
- 2013 Pirates Next Door by Jonny Duddle
  - Maude: The Not-So-Noticeable Shrimpton by Lauren Child & Tricia Krauss
  - The Spider and the Fly by Tony DiTerlizzi
  - The Frank Show by David Mackintosh
  - Black Dog by Levi Pinfold
  - How Dinosaurs Really Work by Alan Snow
- 2012 Marshall Armstrong is New to Our School by David Mackintosh
  - Happiness is a Watermelon on your Head by Stella Dreis, translated by Daniel Hahn
  - Three by the Sea by Mini Grey
  - Major Glad, Major Dizzy by Jan Oke
  - The Lion & the Mouse by Jerry Pinkney
  - Iggy Wilder, Great Lost Dog Adventure by Marcia Williams
- 2011 The Santa Trap by Jonathan Emmett and Poly Bernatene
  - Me and You by Anthony Browne
  - Crazy Hair by Neil Gaiman and Dave McKean
  - In Flanders Fields by Norman Jorgensen and Brian Harrison-Levin
  - Rumblewick and the Dinner Dragons by Hiawyn Oram and Sarah Warburton
  - The Lost Thing by Shaun Tan
- 2010 Tortoise vs Hare: the re-match by Preston Rutt and Ben Redlich
  - Iggy Peck, Architect by Andrea Beatty
  - Child's Garden by Michael Foreman
  - Lion Journal by Carolyn Franklin
  - Goal! by Mina Javerherbin
  - Leon and the Place Between by Angela McAllister and Grahame Baker-Smith
- 2009 Don't Read This Book by Jill Lewis and Deborah Alwright
  - Here Comes Frankie by Tim Hopgood
  - Stone Age Boy by Satoshi Kitamura
  - The Robot and the Bluebird by David Lucas
  - The Boy, the Bear, the Baron and the Bard by Gregory Rogers
  - Wonderful Life by Helen Ward
- 2008 Scoop! An exclusive by Monty Molenski by John Kelly and Cathy Tincknell
  - We're Riding on a Caravan by Laurie Krebs
  - Meerkat Mail by Emily Gravett
  - Dali and the Path of Dreams by Anna Obiols and Subirani
  - The Flower (book) by John Light and Lisa Evans
  - Varmints by Helen Ward and Mark Craste
- 2007 Castles by Colin Thompson
  - The Wizard, the Ugly and the Book of Shame by Pablo Bernasconi
  - Wolves by Emily Gravett
  - Traction Man is Here by Mini Grey
  - Baby Brains Superstar by Simon James
  - The Incredible Book Eating Boy by Oliver Jeffers
- 2006 The Whisperer by Nick Butterworth
  - Tadpole's Promise by Jeanne Willis and Tony Ross
  - Once Upon an Ordinary School Day by Colin McNaughton
  - Into the Forest by Anthony Browne
  - Dougal's Deep Sea Diary by Simon Bartram
  - The Dragon Machine by Helen Ward
- 2005 The Dot by Peter H. Reynolds
  - Bob Robber and Dancing Jane by A Matthews
  - The King with the Horses Ears by Eric Madden
  - The Wolves in the Walls by Neil Gaiman and Dave McKean
  - Rapunzel! A Groovy Fairy Tale by David Roberts
  - Ringle Tingle Tiger by M Austin
- 2004 The Adventures of a Nose by Vivianne Schwarz and Joel Stewart
  - Two Frogs by Chris Wormell
  - Cinderella by David Roberts and Lynn Roberts
  - Blue John by Berlie Doherty
  - Ben's Magic Telescope by Brian Patten

== Hampshire Picture Book Award ==
The Hampshire Picture Book Award is an annual award given to works of children's literature published in paperback during the previous year. The award is judged by children in Year 1 and run by Hampshire County Council's School Library Service. The shortlist is announced in January each year, and the winner announced in April. In May 2012, an award ceremony was held for the first time for the Hampshire Picture Book Award.

Winners and shortlists

- 2023 The Day Fin Flooded the World by Adam Stower
  - Grandad’s Camper by Harry Woodgate
  - A Hero Called Wolf by Lucy Rowland
  - The Elephant Detectives by Ged Adamson
- 2022 The ABC Factor by Katrina Charman
  - The Wide Wide Sea by Anna Wilson
  - Fabulous Fifi by Alice Corrie
  - The Best Worst Day Ever by Sophy Henn
- 2021 Elephant in my Kitchen! by Smriti Halls
  - The Extraordinary Gardener by Sam Broughton
  - Brenda is a Sheep by Morag Hood
  - Let’s all Creep through Crocodile Creek by Jonny Lambert
- 2020 What to do if Your House is a Zoo by John Kelly
  - The Little Green Hen by Alison Murray
  - Billy and the Dragon by Nadia Shireen
  - Field trip to the Moon by Jeanne Willis
- 2019 You’re called What?! by Kes Gray, illustrated by Nikki Dyson
  - Spyder by Matt Carr
  - There was an old Giant who Swallowed a Clock by Becky Davies
  - Little Red Reading Hood by Lucy Rowland
- 2018 Danny McGee Drinks the Sea by Andy Stanton, illustrated by Neal Layton
  - There is no Dragon in This Story by Lou Carter
  - Tidy by Emily Gravett
  - The Bad Bunnies Magic Show by Mini Grey
- 2017 Hoot Owl, Master of Disguise by Sean Taylor, illustrated by Jean Jullien
  - We’re in the Wrong Book by Richard Byrne
  - The Knight Who Wouldn’t Fight by Helen Docherty
  - Poles Apart by Jeanne Willis
- 2016 Use Your Imagination by Nicola O'Byrne
  - The New Small Person by Lauren Child
  - What a Wonderful World by Tim Hopgood
  - My Alien and Me by Smriti Prasadam-Halls
- 2015 Supertato by Sue Hendra
  - Something Different by Jill Lewis and Ali Pye
  - Herman’s Letter by Tom Percival
  - There’s a Lion in my Cornflakes by Michelle Robinson and Jim Field
- 2014 Lion vs Rabbit by Alex Latimer
  - Harold Finds a Voice by Courtney Dicmas
  - Toys in Space by Mini Grey
  - Troll Swap by Leigh Hodgkinson
- 2013 Wolf Won't Bite by Emily Gravett
  - Stanley’s Stick by John Hegley and Neal Layton
  - George Flies South by Simon James
  - If I Could Paint the World by Sarah Massini
- 2012 Otto the Book Bear by Katie Cleminson
  - Angelica Sprocket's Pockets by Quentin Blake
  - Sir Laughalot by Tony Mitton and Sarah Warburton
  - Bedtime for Monsters by Ed Vere
- 2011 This is My Book by Mick Inkpen
  - What the Ladybird Heard by Julia Donaldson and Lydia Monks
  - My mum has X-ray Vision by Angela McAllister and Alex T. Smith
  - Loon on the Moon by Chae Strathie and Emily Golden
- 2010 Super Daisy and the Peril of Planet Pea by Kes Gray and Nick Sharratt
  - Little Boat by Thomas Docherty
  - Class Three all at Sea by Julia Jarman
  - Wolf's Magnificent Master Plan by Melanie Williamson

== Hampshire Information Book Award ==
The Hampshire Information Book Award was launched in 2013. It is awarded to a work of children's non fiction published in paperback in the previous year. The award is judged by children in Year 4 and run by Hampshire County Council's School Library Service. The shortlist is announced in January each year, and the winner announced in April.

Winners and shortlists

- 2023 If the World were 100 Animals by Miranda Smith
  - Geology by Emily Dodd
  - Racial Equality by Anita Ganeri
  - Meet the Minibeasts by Sarah Ridley
  - This is our World by Tracey Turner
- 2022 Ocean Life by Anita Ganeri
  - Why Don’t Eyeballs Fall Out? by Anna Claybourne
  - Fabulously Feisty Queens by Valerie Wilding
  - How to be a Vet by Dr Jess French
  - Mountains by Rebecca Kahn
- 2021 Red Alert! By Catherine Barr
  - How to be Extraordinary by Rashmi Sirdeshpande
  - Go Green! By Liz Gogerly
  - Over Population by Izzi Howell
  - Polar Bear by Louise Spilsbury
- 2020 The Problem with Plastic by Ruth Owen
  - Birds by Ben Hoare
  - Wild World by Angela McAllister
  - The International Space Station by Clive Gifford
  - Weather: Everything you need to know by Dr Jen Green
- 2019 Joan Proctor, Animal Doctor by Patricia Valdez
  - How Does My Home Work? By Chris Butterworth
  - A Kids’ Guide to London by Simon Holland
  - Neil Armstrong and the Moon Landings by Izzi Howell
  - Amazing Animal Homes by Chris Packham
- 2018 Oceans and Seas by Steve Parker
  - The Wright Brothers by Jane Bingham
  - Our Very Own Dog by Amanda McCardle
  - What’s the Season by Ruth Owen
  - Fantastically Great Women who Changed the World by Kate Pankhurst
- 2017 The Epic Book of Epicness by Adam Frost
  - Amazing Universe
  - I (Don’t) Like Snakes by Nicola Davies
  - Wild Adventures by Brita Granstorm
  - Volcanoes by Maria Gill
- 2016 Predators by Paul Calver and Toby Reynolds
  - Incredible Insects by Richard Spilsbury
  - Be An Explorer by Chris Oxlade
  - A Rock is Lively by Diana Hutts Aston
  - A Walk in Paris by Salvatore Rubbino
- 2015 Lions by Sally Morgan
  - Journey Through the Solar System by Simon Abbott
  - Ancient Egypt by Penelope Arlon
  - Super Skeleton by Anna Claybourne
  - Animal Kingdom by John Richards and Ed Simkins
- 2014 Weather by P Arlon and T Gordon-Harris
  - Animal Diaries - Spider by S Parker
  - Lunchbox - the Story of Food by C Butterworth
  - Get Cooking! Edited by C Love
  - Shelters and Habitats by S Green
- 2013 Fizzing Physics by Steve Parker
  - Knight Survival Guide by Anna Claybourne
  - Acorn to Oak Tree by Alexandra Koken (ed)
  - Hidden in the Trees by Angela Royston
  - Let’s Ride a Bike by Ruth Walton
