= Frog (picture book character) =

Book series by Max Velthuijs

Frog (Dutch: Kikker) is a character in a series of children's picture books created by Dutch author and illustrator Max Velthuijs.

The first Frog title in English was published in 1989, entitled Frog In Love, translated by Klaus Flugge for Andersen Press. Frog books have been translated into more than 50 languages. So far eight titles have been translated from Dutch to English.

In the Netherlands Frog is known as Kikker and has become a well-known and loved book character. Together with his friends Pig, Duck and Hare, Frog lives in an anthropomorphic animal world. He observes daily events from a childlike perspective, offering children insight into social interactions. In Frog's world, there is no status. All the animals are the same size, which gives them absolute equality. Every animal has its own personality and skills. Frog and his friends enjoy life and deal with real life issues, such as fear, love, sadness, and loss, making these difficult subjects and emotions more understandable for children. At the end of each book, there's always a positive solution for the dilemma's the animals face.

In Britain Frog Is A Hero was included in the National Curriculum.

Velthuijs received the prestigious Hans Christian Andersen Medal in 2004 for the illustrations of his own Frog books.

When Max Velthuijs died in January 2005, Carmen Diana Dearden said: ‘like in Frog and the Birdsong, “all his life he sang beautifully for us,” and he will always sing his lovely songs through his books.’
