= Yaron Edelstein =

Israeli playwright

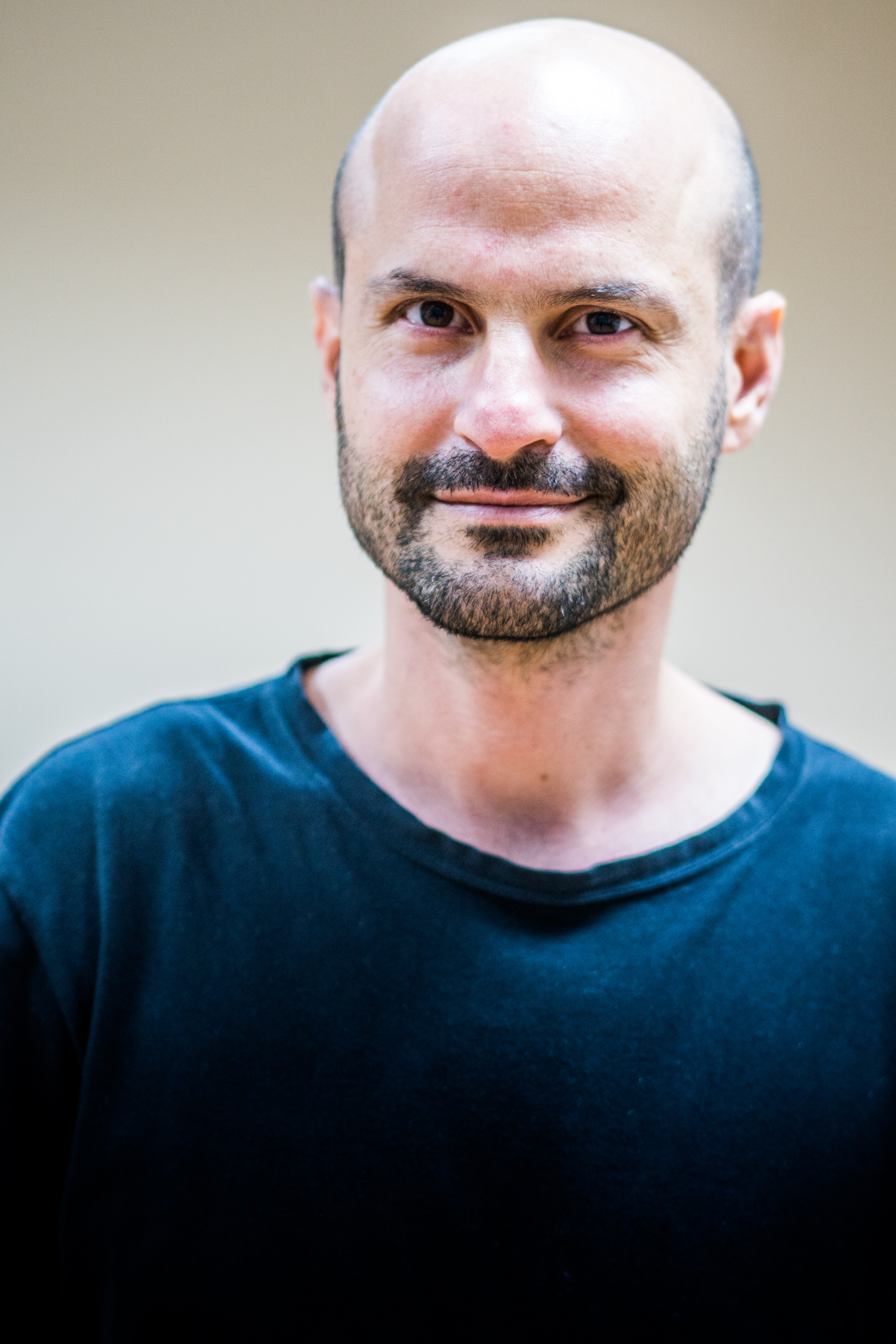
Yaron Edelstein

Yaron Edelstein (Hebrew: ירון אדלשטיין; born 1979) is an Israeli playwright and theatre director. His plays performed in Israel, Finland, Germany, and Italy and have been translated into English, French, Polish, German, and Italian. Edelstein won the Cameri Theater Best Playwright Award (2021, 2024), the Israeli Fringe Award for Best Director and Best Dramatic Adaptor (2010), the Acre Festival prize for Best Original Show (2013), and in Germany, he received an award at the Heidelberger Stückemarkt for his play Mountain.

== Early life ==
Edelstein grew in Rehovot, Israel. He graduated from the Department of Theatre Directing at the School for Performing Arts in Kibbutzim College Tel Aviv (2003-2006).

== Career ==
Mountain, Edelstein's first original play, is a fantasy dealing with the Israeli ethos of bravery, follows five soldiers in an endless war. It corresponds to controversial combats in the history of the state of Israel and historical figures such as Israeli leader Ariel Sharon. In 2010 the play won an award at the Heidelberger Stückemarkt Festival in Germany and was chosen to be produced as a full production. Timo Kirstin directed its European premiere in 2011 at the Theater & Orchester Heidelberg. Harald Raab, reviewing in the Nachtkritik wrote: "Edelstein gives an insight into the physical and psychological destruction of immediate experiences during warfare: no heroic epic, but also no striking anti-war piece. Just an Ecce homo - and therefore strong: young men who have not yet overcome their fear of the mythical woman and therefore boast about their sexual conquest adventures, in the extreme situation of having to kill and in the danger of being killed themselves." In 2013 Mountain was staged at the Notzar Theatre in Israel, under the direction of Dalit Milstein, a collaborator in the writing process.

In 2009 Edelstein led an ensemble of writers and actors in the creation of Nana's friends, a satiric performance that ran in Tel Aviv's Tmu-na Theater until 2013. The show was nominated for Best Ensemble Show in Israel Fringe in 2010. Marat Parkhomovsky, writing for Time Out Tel-Aviv, described the show: "Theatre and funkiness are two notions that rarely meet. This is the rare case of a funky theatre: extreme, unexpected, fast, furious and authentically exhilarating."

In 2010, together with Tal Brenner, Edelstein adapted for the stage Sholem Aleichem's story The Creature. The adaptation, co-directed by Edelstein and Brenner, was staged in Seminar Hakibutzim College for Dramatic Arts and continued its run at Tzavta theatre in Tel Aviv. Edelstein and Brenner won the 2010 Israel Fringe Prize for Best Adapted Play and Best Theatre Directors.

In 2013, Edelstein's play Pfffffff, co-written and directed with Aharon Levin, premiered at the Acre Festival for Alternative Theatre. Pfffffff won the festival's first prize and continued to run until 2015 at The Incubator Theatre in Jerusalem. Pffffffff, a dark farce, follows an Israeli submarine commander that has decided to take matters into his own hands and initiate a nuclear assault against Iran. Meanwhile, Israel's top politicians and security personnel gather in a desperate attempt to stop the imminent nuclear holocaust. Introducing the event's final award, Yossi Sarid, chair of the Acre festival committee, described the show : "The play is dramatized and portrayed as a dark farce calling for complete freedom of the imagination. But on second thought and perhaps a third, it may be far more realistic than we suppose." In 2014 the play took part in the IsraDrama and International Exposure of Israeli Theatre events and was subsequently translated into English and Polish.

In 2014 Edelstein directed the show The Vampire, the Thief, the Prostitute and the Moon, which he wrote in collaboration with students at Beit Zvi School of the Performing Arts. The show, written in a fantasy style, brought to stage four original tales.

In 2015, Edelstein and Aharon Levin co-wrote and directed the children's play The Little Mole based on the best selleing book "The Story of the Little Mole Who Knew It Was None of His Business" by Wolf Erlbruch. The show premiered in the Tel Aviv Museum of Art and in 2016 the production was nominated for the Israeli Children's Theatre Awards for Best Show, Best Directors and Best Original Music and won the Best Supporting Actor for Itzik Lilach. In 2019 the play was translated into Italian and was directed by Claudia de La Seta and had its Rome premiere at the Teatro Tor Bella Monaca.

Later in 2015, Edelstein wrote and directed the children's play On Three Pandas and One Goldilocks together with actress Ayala Dangur. The production premiered at The Train Theatre as part of the International Puppet Festival in Jerusalem. In 2015 it was nominated for Best Single Performer Show for Children.

In 2016 Edelstein adapted and directed Anton Chekhov's The Seagull. It was performed at Seminar Hakibbutzim College for Dramatic Arts. The production was chosen to represent the college in the annual festival of performing arts schools at Habima Theatre.

In 2017 Edelstein's play The Ephemerals premiered at the Notzar Theatre under his direction. In 2018 the play was granted the Mifal HaPayis scholarship for translation and was translated into English by Natalie Fainstein. The play was chosen to perform at the International Exposure of Israeli Theatre events in 2018. The Ephemerals, an urban fantasy, follows the stories of 8 characters and a dog in a big city when a terrorist bombing suddenly occurs and shakes their worlds. The main character, Avot, is a young poet making a living as a weatherman, a job he detests. He finds himself in the middle of the terror attack scene, first to cover the event live on primetime television and consequently gets a taste of glory and recognition. Fueled by the desire to extend his brief moment of fame, Avot decides to initiate further terror attacks throughout the city himself, in order to be the first to cover them.

In 2021, Edelstein's play Ringo premiered at The Cameri Theater of Tel Aviv, directed by Amit Apte. The play won Edelstein the 2021 Cameri Theatre Best Playwright Award. Ringo, a wild musical comedy, tells the story of Danny Dingot that minutes after he proposes to Mika, discovers that his penis has disappeared. By then his penis - Ringo - is already celebrating its independence all over town. While Danny sets off in search of his lost manhood, Mika is swept off her feet and have an affair with Ringo and Ringo himself enlists in the IDF and is abducted by Hamas. Nano Shabtai, writing for Haaretz, described the play as "light-hearted and witty comedy, that also evokes thought and mostly a human-artistic longing for more humane world, for equality and love, similar to great musicals like Hair. This is a fun human-loving theatre capsule". In 2023, it was showcased at the R.E.A.D. festival in Helsinki.

Also in 2021, Edelstein and Aharon Levin co-wrote the children's play Sticky. The play received the Maison Antoine Vitez grant and was translated into French by Laurence Sendrowicz. In 2024, it was published by Edition Théâtrales.

In 2022, Edelstein wrote the one-person play 'Where Your Heart Beats' and co-directed it with Tal Brenner, starring Daniel Sabag. The play premiered at the 2023 Theatronetto Festival in Jaffa and continued to be performed at the Habima Theater and across the country. The play tells the story of a young soldier who is granted special leave from the army after his father suffers a heart attack and is scheduled for a major bypass surgery. He decides to spend the night before the surgery at a small neighborhood pub on Lilienblum Street in Tel Aviv, where he seeks comfort in the words and stories of the pub’s staff and regulars, trying to ease his anxiety. Surrounded by alcohol and the atmosphere of the pub, he absorbs the flood of fantasies, quirks, and breakdowns from the pub’s patrons, all set against the harshness of reality, and in the process, he reconnects with himself.

In 2023, Edelstein wrote the play 'Mikey Saves The Day,' which premiered at the Cameri Theater of Tel Aviv. The play was directed by Amit Apte and performed by the Cameri, a new generation group. The play won Edelstein the 2024 Cameri Theatre Best Playwright Award. The play follows Mickey, a young ISA agent and dedicated Israeli patriot, who is assigned a top-secret mission: to travel back in time to November 1995 and prevent the Assassination of Yitzhak Rabin. Unexpectedly, in Tel Aviv in the mid-90s,’ Mickey meets his future parents and tries to prevent the betrayal that will ruin their marriage - only to discover a more profound and darker betrayal that he could never have imagined.

=== Teaching ===
Edelstein currently (2021) teaches acting and dramatic writing at Kibbutzim College in Tel Aviv and Improvising skills at the Improv Theatre Israel. Since 2006 he and Boaz Debby lead groups of soldiers between the ages 18–21 in an annual acting workshop enabling creative expression within the complex experience of mandatory military service in Israel. Together with Boaz Debby and Eran Ben Zvi, Edelstein founded and to this day leads the improvisation ensemble 'V.I.Play.'

== Works ==
=== Plays ===
- Mountain, Theatre & Orchester Heidelberg, Germany, 2011; Notzar theatre, Israel, 2014; Tmu-na theatre, Israel, 2019;
- The Creature, (Co-written with Tal Brenner) an adaptation of Shalom Aleichem's story, Tzavta theatre, Israel, 2011
- Pfffffff, (Co-written with Aharon Levin), Acre Festival and Incubator theatre, Israel 2013
- The Little Mole, (Co-written with Aharon Levin), Tel Aviv Museum, 2015; Teatro Tor Bella Monaca, Italy, 2019; Be'er Sheva Theatre for Children and Youth, Israel, 2019
- The Ephemerals, Notzar theatre, Israel, 2017
- Ringo, The Cameri Theatre of Tel Aviv, Israel, 2021
- Where your heart beats, Theatronetto Festival and Habima theatre, Israel, 2023.
- Mickey Saves the Day, The Cameri Theatre of Tel Aviv, Israel, 2024.

=== Directing work ===
- Nana's Friends, Tmu-na theatre, Israel, 2009
- The Good Soldier Svejk, (Co-directed with Tal Brenner), Seminar Hkibutzim College, Israel, 2011.
- The Vampire, the Thief, the Prostitute and the Moon, Beit-Zvi School of Performance Arts, Israel, 2014
- On Three Pandas and One Goldilocks, The Train Theatre, Israel, 2015
- The Seagull, Seminar Hakibutzim College and Habima National Theatre, Israel, 2017

=== Awards and honours ===
- Heidelberger Stückemarkt Festival's Award, Germany, for Mountain (2010)
- Israel Fringe Prize for Best Adapted Play and Best Director, Israel, for The Creature (2010)
- Acre Festival prize for best show, Israel, for Pfffffff (2013)
- Nominations for the Israeli Children's Theatre Awards in the categories of Best Show, Best Director, Best Original Music and Best Supporting actor for The Little Mole (2016)
- Mifal Hapais grant for translation, Israel, for The Ephemerals (2018)
- Maison Antoin Vitez grant for translation, France, for Sticky (2021)
- The Cameri Theatre prize for best playwright, Israel, for Ringo (2021)
