= Eleanor Farjeon Award =

British children's literary award

The Eleanor Farjeon Award is made for distinguished service to the world of British children's books and is given to someone whose commitment and contribution is deemed to be outstanding. Founded in 1966, it is presented annually in memory of the celebrated author Eleanor Farjeon (1881–1965). The spirit of the award is to recognise the unsung heroes who contribute so much to every aspect of children's books. The award is administered by the Children's Book Circle and sponsored by the Eleanor Farjeon Trust.

== Winners ==
- 1966, Margery Fisher
- 1967, Jessica Jenkins
- 1968, Brian Alderson, author, compiler and editor
- 1969, Anne Wood
- 1970, Kaye Webb
- 1971, Margaret Meek
- 1972, Janet Hill
- 1973, Eleanor Graham
- 1974, Leila Berg
- 1975, Naomi Lewis
- 1976, Joyce Oldmeadow and Court Oldmeadow, booksellers and founders of Dromkeen Collection, Australia
- 1977, Elaine Moss
- 1978, Peter Kennerley
- 1979, Joy Whitby
- 1980, Dorothy Butler
- 1981, Margaret Marshall and Virginia Jensen
- 1982, Aidan Chambers and Nancy Chambers
- 1983, Jean Russell
- 1984, Shirley Hughes, author and illustrator
- 1985, Bob Leeson, writer
- 1986, Judith Elkin
- 1987, Valerie Bierman
- 1988, National Library for the Handicapped Child
- 1989, Anna Home
- 1990, Jill Bennett, teacher and writer
- 1991, Patricia Crampton
- 1992, Stephanie Nettell, Children's Book Editor of The Guardian 1978-92
- 1993, Susan Belgrave, MBE, Founder and President of Volunteer Reading Help
- 1994, Eileen Colwell, MBE, librarian and author
- 1995, Helen Paiba, author and bookseller
- 1996, Books for Keeps
- 1997, Michael Rosen, author
- 1998, Gina Pollinger
- 1999, Klaus Flugge, publisher, Andersen Press
- 2000, Julia Eccleshare, journalist
- 2001, Amelia Edwards, art director
- 2002, Philip Pullman, author
- 2003, Miriam Hodgson, editor
- 2004, Jacqueline Wilson, author
- 2005, Malorie Blackman, author
- 2006, Wendy Cooling founder of Bookstart
- 2007, Jane Nissen, publisher
- 2008, Chris Brown, educator and editor, School Library Association
- 2009, Moira Arthur, former Managing Director of Peters Bookselling Services
- 2010, Seven Stories, the Centre for Children's Books
- 2011, The Federation of Children's Book Groups
- 2012, Quentin Blake, illustrator and author
- 2013, David Almond, author
- 2014, Polka Theatre, children's theatre
- 2015, Terry Pratchett, author, awarded posthumously
- 2016, John Agard, poet and playwright
- 2017, Keats Community Library
- 2018, Michael Morpurgo, author
- 2019, CLPE, the Centre for Literacy in Primary Education
