= Tadpole's Promise =

2003 children's picture book by Jeanne Willis

- First edition
- Author: Jeanne Willis
- Illustrator: Tony Ross
- Language: English
- Genre: Children's
- Publisher: Andersen Press
- Publication date: April 24, 2003
- Publication place: United Kingdom
- Pages: 32 pp
- ISBN: 978-1-84270-069-3
- OCLC: 56712929
- LC Class: MLCS 2006/45264

Tadpole's Promise is a 2003 British children's picture book written by Jeanne Willis and illustrated by Tony Ross. It won the Nestlé Smarties Book Prize Silver Award and was longlisted for the Kate Greenaway Medal.

== Plot ==
A tadpole and a caterpillar fall in love. Despite promising to never change, the tadpole grows arms and legs and becomes a frog. The caterpillar becomes a butterfly and is eaten by the frog.
