= Susan Varley =

English writer and illustrator

- Born: 1961 (age 64–65); Blackpool, England
- Education: Manchester Polytechnic
- Occupations: Illustrator, writer
- Children: 1
- Writing career
- Genre: Children's picture books
- Notable work: Badger's Parting Gifts
- Notable awards: Mother Goose Award 1985

Susan Varley is a British illustrator and author of children's picture books. Her best known book is Badger's Parting Gifts, a story which aims to be a gentle introduction to old age and bereavement for young children. She both wrote and illustrated the book, and it was awarded the Mother Goose Award in 1985.

== Early life ==
Born in 1961 in Blackpool, England, Varley studied graphic design and illustration at Manchester Polytechnic.

== Career ==
Badger's Parting Gifts was Susan Varley's first book, it was published by Andersen Press in 1984. A traditional picture book, it seeks to introduce old age and death to young children through a cast of anthropomorphised woodland characters. It won the 1985 Mother Goose Award, an award for the "most exciting newcomer to British children's book illustration". The judges commented that Varley's treatment of the difficult subject of grief was "just distanced enough" for young children "and in no way mawkish". Some booksellers however reportedly refused to take it at the time, because of the subject matter.

Badger's Parting Gifts is still in print, and in 2019 a 35th anniversary edition was released in partnership with the charity Child Bereavement UK. It continues to be cited by grief counsellors, teachers and journalists as an effective book to facilitate discussions about death and grief with children.

Varley has also illustrated other authors' books, including The Monster Bed by Jeanne Willis, Two Small Pandas and Lovely Old Lion by Julia Jarman, The Spring Rabbit by Joyce Dunbar, and Captain Small Pig by Martin Waddell. All are published by Andersen.

== Personal life ==
Varley is married, with one daughter. She lives in England.

== Selected works ==
- Badger's Parting Gifts, Andersen Press, London 1984
