= Dead Bird =

Dead Bird or The Dead Bird may refer to:

- "Dead Bird" (song), a song by Suede on their 2018 album The Blue Hour
- Dead Bird (album), a 2009 album by Swiss folk rock group 77 Bombay Street
- The Dead Bird (book), a children's book by Margaret Wise Brown
- The Dead Bird, a former name of the defunct Australian newspaper The Arrow

== See also ==
- Dead Birds (disambiguation)
