= Dr. Xargle =

- Cover of Dr Xargle's Book of Earthlets, the first in the series (1988), art by Tony Ross
- Author: Jeanne Willis
- Illustrator: Tony Ross
- Language: English
- Publisher: E. P. Dutton
- Published: 1988-2004

Dr. Xargle /ˈzɑːrɡəl/ is a series of children's picture books written by Jeanne Willis and illustrated by Tony Ross; the original six books were published by Andersen Press from 1988 to 1993. It features an alien perspective on human civilization, especially the life of British children and their families. Alternatively, Dr. Xargle is the main character, an alien who studies Earth and teaches schoolchildren about it. Sometimes he takes them on field trips to Earth in human disguises. Finally, Dr. Xargle is a 1997 British television series based on the original books.

For the third book in the series, Dr. Xargle's Book of Earth Tiggers (1990), Ross was highly commended runner up for the annual Kate Greenaway Medal from the Library Association, recognising the year's best children's book illustration by a British subject. (Note: Today there are usually eight books on the Greenaway shortlist. According to CCSU, some runners up were Commended (from 1959) or Highly Commended (from 1974). The high distinction was approximately annual from 1979, including Ross alone for 1990.)

== Books ==
All seven books were published in hardcover editions by Andersen Press. The original series was published in British paperback editions by Red Fox (Random House) within a few years. In the United States, the books have titles such as Earthlets, as explained by Professor Xargle—the first book, published by E. P. Dutton in 1989.

- Dr. Xargle's Book of Earthlets (1988)
- Dr. Xargle's Book of Earth Hounds (1989)
- Dr. Xargle's Book of Earth Tiggers (1990), A.K.A. Earth Tigerlets
- Dr. Xargle's Book of Earth Mobiles (1991)
- Dr. Xargle's Book of Earth Weather (1992)
- Dr. Xargle's Book of Earth Relations (1993), A.K.A. Earth Families
- Dr. Xargle Stories (1999): An Audiobook collection of all the books except Sleepovers.
- Dr. Xargle's Book of Earthlet Sleepovers (2004): A limited edition picture book (in association with DryNites) including support and information about bedwetting.

== Television series ==
A 13-episode television series was produced by CINAR Films and King Rollo Films, and broadcast in 1997: Dr. Xargle and his students are animatronic puppets, while the students' lessons about Earth are animated.

Unnamed in the books, the planet was identified as Planet Queeg, and the children were called Queegles. It is unclear whether their species is named Queegle, or this is the name for their infants (the adults being called Queegs).

=== Characters ===
- Dr. Xargle: Voiced by Willie Rushton, who died shortly after his lines were recorded.
- Xamster
- Matron
- Monitor
- Cute
- Rebel
- Tardy Queegle
- Famished Queegle
- Nigel Spume, a human reporter trying to prove the aliens' existence.

=== Episodes ===
Each of the 13 episodes had a duration of approximately 30 minutes. Several episode broadcast dates, as well as the episode order, are currently unknown.
There was also a break in broadcasting that has not yet been accounted for.

Episode number	Episode name	Topic	Original airdate
1	Earthlets	Infants	26 February 1997
2	Earth Hounds	Dogs	5 March 1997
3	Earth Mobility	Transport	12 March 1997
4	Earth Weather	Weather	28 July 1997
5	Earth Thingummies	Gadgets	4 August 1997
6	Earth Jobbery	Careers	11 August 1997
7	Earth Nicety	Manners	18 August 1997
8	Earth Relativity	Family	Unknown
9	Earth Snacky	Food	Unknown
10	Earth Trendy	Fashion	Unknown
11	Earth Furnishy	Furniture	Unknown
12	Earth Sport	Sport & Fitness	Unknown
13	Earth Tiggers	Cats	Unknown
