= Max Velthuijs =

Dutch painter, illustrator and writer (1923–2005)

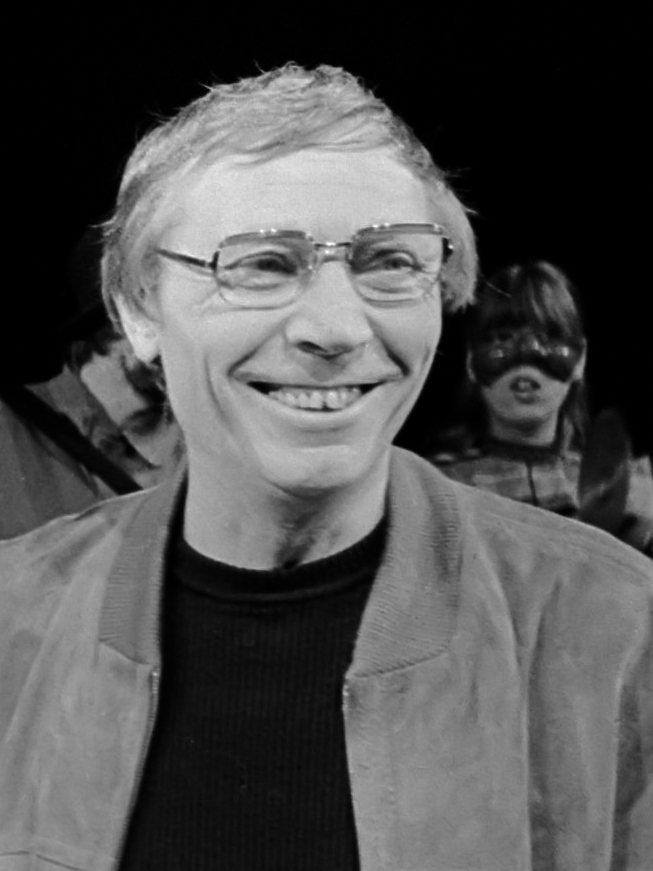
- Max Velthuijs (1977)
- Born: 22 May 1923; The Hague, Netherlands
- Died: 25 January 2005 (aged 81); The Hague
- Occupations: Painter, illustrator and writer
- Writing career
- Genre: Children's picture books

Max Velthuijs (22 May 1923 – 25 January 2005) was a Dutch painter, illustrator and writer, one of the most famous children's illustrators in the Netherlands. His works have been translated from Dutch into English, Finnish, French, Swedish, German, Spanish, Italian, Japanese, Chinese, Korean, Russian, Portuguese, Polish, Czech, Norwegian and Danish. In 2004 he received the Hans Christian Andersen Medal for his "lasting contribution to children's literature".

== Biography ==
Velthuijs was born in The Hague on 22 May 1923. During World War II, he sometimes assisted Jan Gregoor in forging stamps for the Dutch resistance in identity papers of people in hiding.

A productive commercial artist, his first children's book commission as an illustrator was relatively late in his career, in 1962 for the 10th edition of Versjes die wij nooit vergeten [Rhymes we will never forget]. This was a famous book of rhymes for young children with several previous illustrators. It was followed two years later by A is een aapje [A is for Ape], whose success established his name as a children's book illustrator internationally. A German-language edition was published by NordSüd Verlag of Zürich (NorthSouth Books) and thereafter many of his books were co-published by NordSüd.

Velthuijs is known best for the Frog picture books (Dutch Wikipedia lists 21 titles). The first was Frog in Love, published by Andersen Press in 1989, which gained global recognition. According to an appreciation of Velthuijs and Frog, by Joanna Carey for The Guardian a month before his death, Velthuijs "is in the unique position of living and working in The Hague but having all his books published first in England by Klaus Flugge at Andersen Press". NordSüd had rejected the Frog in Love in 1988, but Flugge picked it up at a book fair, considered it extraordinary, and took it on. In 2003, it was adapted as a children's play by David Farmer (Frog in Love), performed by the Tiebreak Theatre Company at Norwich Playhouse. Frog is a Hero was included in the National Curriculum for England.

Velthuijs died in The Hague, his native city, on 25 January 2005.

The biennial Hans Christian Andersen Award conferred by the International Board on Books for Young People is the highest recognition available to a writer or illustrator of children's books. Velthuijs received the writing award in 2004.

In his acceptance speech Velthuijs observed (translated from Dutch): "Drawing a Frog is not so difficult. But how do you draw a Frog in love? Or a frightened frog? ... And when I hear from parents and children how much they love Frog and his friends, I am overcome with joy and a feeling of accomplishment. And when you ask me how I did it, I have to answer that question with a simple 'I do not know'."

Jury president Jeffrey Garrett credited him with fables of human nobility, rather than Aesop's "foolishness, vanity, and meanness". "The stories of Kikker, or Frog, and his diverse group of friends are miniature morality plays for our age, demonstrating in framed vignettes—as if on a stage—that life can be hard but is in the end good, that there will be comfort: do not give up, do not lose faith, for you are stronger than you think, and you are not alone."

== See also ==
- Frog and the Birdsong
