= The Monster Bed =

1987 children's book by Jeanne Willis

- First edition
- Author: Jeanne Willis
- Illustrator: Susan Varley
- Cover artist: Susan Varley
- Language: English
- Genre: Children's Book
- Publisher: Andersen Press
- Publication date: 1986
- Publication place: United Kingdom
- Media type: Hardcover
- ISBN: 0-688-06804-9
- OCLC: 13792915
- Dewey Decimal: [E] 19
- LC Class: PZ8.3.W6799 Mo 1987

The Monster Bed is a 1987 children's book by Jeanne Willis and illustrated by Susan Varley that revolves around the twist on the common "monster under the bed" childhood fear. The book is a young reader, normally aimed for 4 years or older. The main character, the monster Dennis, believes that human children are under his bed and will get him as he falls asleep. His mother, however, tries to get him to go to sleep. Eventually, a human child accidentally ventures into their home cave, and both the human and Dennis discover each other, frightening both.

The book was aimed at decreasing the fear of night in children by basically telling them that monsters were just as afraid of humans as humans were of monsters. The book received good reviews after it came out, with hardly any review lower than a 75% rating on any book review site. Some of the books came with an extra plush toy of Dennis with his pillow and teddy bear in each arm.

An animated adaptation of the book was broadcast on September 9, 1989, as one of the ABC Weekend Specials. Various liberties were taken with the adaptation such as Dennis’ name being changed to Trashy and having an antagonist.

== Plot summary ==
=== Introduction ===
The introduction starts the book in the setting of a small picnic of a human and his dog. The human is apparently telling the reader to not venture into the Withering Wood, a forest of trees rumored to have legendary creatures such as hairy trolls, nasty gnomes, and scary pixies and fairies.

The book then changes setting into inside the forest, where we see a small monster named Dennis and his mother, showing that Dennis was very polite for a young monster. It describes Dennis's fear of humans, which leads to the next part of the book.

=== Dennis's fear of children ===
Dennis's mother gives Dennis his teddy bear and leaves the lights on for Dennis.

Dennis screams and shouts he will not go to bed. The mother, surprised at this sudden fear of bed, asks why. Dennis explains that he is afraid of humans. He says humans will "creep under my monster bed while I'm asleep". Dennis's mother is not convinced of her son's story and tries to persuade Dennis to fall asleep.

She gives Dennis his teddy bear and also says she will not turn off the light. She begins to kiss Dennis, but Dennis reacts and bites her on the nose. Dennis's mother then promises her son that the humans won't get him. She then readies him for bed. However, Dennis concludes he will sleep under his bed so the humans will not be able to find him.

=== A child lost ===
As Dennis falls asleep, a young boy skips school and ventures into the Withering Wood to hide (presumably from his parents). He walks deep into the woods so that he comes upon Dennis's and his mother's cave. Not knowing where he is, he walks into the cave for rest. He then decides to sleep.

He finds Dennis's bedroom and decides to sleep on the bed. He changes into his night clothes and begins to fall asleep, but the boy was afraid of monsters. With the absence of his mother, he checks under the bed himself, and to his surprise, he finds Dennis. Both Dennis and the young boy run away.

The book then explains not to misbehave and how it would feel if Dennis's mother would tell the reader if humans were not real.

== Major characters ==
=== Dennis ===
Dennis is a polite, green, cave-dwelling reptilian monster that resembles a Velociraptor. As the main character of the story, he has many human-like features, such as smiling, walking, and emotion. The monster has two objects he carries around with him, his teddy bear and pillow. He is given these objects to give the reader an impression of a small child. Dennis also possesses several toys. These toys resemble the characters of another children's book, Where the Wild Things Are. Dennis also plays hopskotch near his cave.

Dennis has a strong fear of human children. He believes that there are humans underneath his bed, just as humans believe there are monsters underneath their beds. This fear has led him into trouble with his mother. He has even bitten her nose while she was about to kiss him. However, in the end, Dennis chose to sleep underneath his bed so that the children could not find him underneath there.

=== Dennis's mother ===
Dennis's mother (right) listens to Dennis (left) explain why he believes humans are under his bed and will get him as he sleeps.

Dennis's mother is a larger monster than Dennis, though obviously of the same species. A caring mother, she tries to get her son, Dennis, to sleep on top of his bed and to discontinue his fear of humans. When Dennis refuses to sleep on top of his bed, she goes through extreme difficulties to get him to sleep. She keeps the light on, she gives Dennis his teddy bear.

The mother is shown to be "much larger" than Dennis, the small monster. The mother has many human mother-like qualities, such as her purse that she is seen carrying in the beginning of the book. She tucks her child in every night, and also reads stories to him about humans. She also plays with Dennis as well.

=== Small child ===
Not much is known about the small child. On the day of Dennis's refusal to sleep, the boy had skipped school, described in the book as hooky, and had hid in the forest. The child soon lost his way and wandered into the cave where Dennis and the monster's mother lived. By the time he arrived at the cave, he was very tired of walking and decided to sleep in the cave. He eventually found Dennis's room, with the bed.

He took his clothes off into his pajamas and then decided to go to sleep. With the absence of the boy's mother and his fear of monsters underneath the bed, he decided the only way to see if there were monsters was to look under the bed himself. When he gazed under the bed, he saw Dennis. Both Dennis and the boy had the same reaction; they were afraid of each other. Thus, the boy ran out of the cave and Dennis ran to his mother. It is unknown what happened to the boy after the small incident.

=== Other characters ===
There are a few other minor or secondary characters in The Monster Bed. These include:

- Picnic boy, a small boy introduced at the beginning of the story, and tells the reader of the dangers of the "Withering Wood". He has presumably been into the Withering Wood, as he is seen running out of the forest with his picnic kit. He owns the white and brown dog, and can be seen eating an apple, sandwich, and other food during his picnic.
- The dog, a brown and white dog that is owned by the Picnic boy. It is, like its owner, scared of the many stories about the Withering Wood.
- Other children, humans that Dennis believes is under his bed.

== Morals ==
The second, alternate cover of The Monster Bed.

There are two major morals in The Monster Bed that can both give children two lessons. One is fear of the opposite race, such as monsters' fear of children and children's fear of monsters. The book was meant to give the impression to children that their fear was as scared of them as they were of their fear, providing comfort for the small children. It also teaches children to check under the bed themselves.

Another possible moral is to teach kids not to skip school, as the small child did, and to not try to hide from your parents in areas you do not know.

== Reaction ==
The book received great reviews from parents for various reasons. Some were excited their child had begun reading, and some loved the illustrations, plot, and characters. Others liked it because it appealed to their children and because it had an unusual twist on children's fear of monsters. The book received a 4.5 rating at Amazon.com, and a 4/5 on Circle Time book reviews.

== Style ==
The Monster Bed is not unusual in its writing style and illustration style.

The book was written by Jeanne Willis. The style of the writing is in the format of a poem, with the first and second lines rhyming and the third and fourth rhyming, such as "He took off his pillows and blankets and said, / 'From now on, I plan to sleep under my bed. / If I'm underneath and a human comes near, / It won't think to look for me, safe under here'". There is mostly four lines per page, though some pages have six, and one page has only a single line.

The illustrations were created by Susan Varley using watercolor and pencil. The illustrations give the reader the impression that both Dennis and his mother are just like humans. Susan Varley even added a small easter egg to her illustrations—a closer look at Dennis's many toys everywhere in the house reveals that they are the same creatures as seen in Where the Wild Things Are.

== Plush toy ==
Some editions of the book come with a plush toy of Dennis, the main character, with a teddy bear in one hand and his pillow in the other. All of the toy's limbs are moveable, including the monster's ears, and it was made to be a bedtime toy. The toy follows all of the details in the book, down to the texture of Dennis's skin.
