= Sam Angus =

Sam or Samuel Angus may refer to:

- Samuel F. Angus (1855–1908), American businessman and sports team owner
- Samuel Angus (1881–1943), Australian theologian
- Samuel Angus, lieutenant at Battle of Frenchman's Creek 1812
- Sam Angus (writer) (born 1967), children's author
