= Not Now, Bernard =

1980 children's picture book by David McKee

- Not Now, Bernard: First edition 1980
- Author: David McKee
- Illustrator: David McKee
- Language: English
- Genre: Children's picture book, dark comedy
- Publisher: Andersen Press
- Publication date: 1980
- Publication place: United Kingdom
- Media type: Hardcover
- ISBN: 978-1783449736

Not Now, Bernard is a children's picture book written and illustrated by David McKee. It is widely considered a modern classic.

== Plot ==
Bernard tries to attract the attention of his preoccupied parents, who consistently reply "Not now, Bernard". Bernard goes into the garden and meets a monster which eats him. The monster goes into the house and tries to attract the parents' attention but gets the same reaction from them, completely oblivious to the monster replacing their son. The monster lives Bernard's life, but more badly behaved, for the rest of the day. Finally, at bed time, he tries to tell Bernard's mother that he is a monster, but she replies "Not now, Bernard".

== Publication ==
First published in 1980 by Andersen Press, Not Now, Bernard has been translated into more than 20 languages and over its lifetime, it has never been out of print.

== Reception ==
Not Now, Bernard was controversial on publication. Kirkus Reviews were doubtful it would appeal to children, and many reviewers thought it would frighten them, as the book's child hero is eaten. In an interview with author McKee in 2020, he says some libraries “banned it for violence”. However, it became a modern classic.

Described by Donna Ferguson in The Guardian as a “cautionary tale of the perils of ignoring children”, it's a book many parents see themselves in. As Sheila Hancock wrote in The Independent, this book “demonstrates that parents can be naughty too”. And that “when we don’t listen to people, monsters can take over”.

== Legacy ==
Still in print more than 40 years later, an updated 40th-anniversary edition was released in 2020. In the new edition, Bernard's parents are now preoccupied by their digital devices, on top of the housework and D.I.Y.

In 2020 author and illustrator McKee was awarded the BookTrust Lifetime Achievement Award in recognition of his whole body of work, including Not Now, Bernard.

According to BookTrust, as of 2021 Not Now, Bernard has sold more than 5 million copies.
