= Frog and the Birdsong =

1991 picture book by Max Velthuijs

- Author: Max Velthuijs
- Original title: Kikker en het vogeltje
- Illustrator: Max Velthuijs
- Cover artist: Velthuijs
- Language: Dutch
- Series: Frog
- Subject: Death
- Genre: Children's book, ages 3–6
- Publisher: Leopold (English: Andersen Press, Korean: Agaworld montessori)
- Publication date: 1991
- Pages: 26
- ISBN: 9025847544 (Dutch); 978-0862649081 (English); 89-536-1967-X (Korean)

Frog and the Birdsong (Dutch: "Kikker en het vogeltje") is a 1991 children's picture book by Dutch author and illustrator Max Velthuijs. It is one of the books in the "Frog" series. The main character, Frog, finds a dead bird, and with the help of his friends investigates death and buries the bird, after which funerary games lead to insight on life. The book won the 1992 Gouden Griffel and is frequently used in classrooms and therapeutic settings to teach children how to cope with death.

== Synopsis ==
Frog runs to Pig to tell her he has found a "broken" bird (a songbird resembling a common blackbird). Pig thinks the bird is asleep. Duck, who joins the conversation, thinks it is ill, but Hare knows it is dead and solemnly declares that "everything dies." Hare delivers a brief eulogy: "He sang beautifully all of his life. Now he gets his well-deserved rest." The friends dig a grave for the bird, put flowers on its body, and put a rock over the grave. Afterward, as they are walking away, Frog starts playing tag and they all have a wonderful afternoon, prompting Frog to exclaim, "Isn't life beautiful!" As they return home at sundown, another blackbird starts singing a beautiful song, "as it always does," indicating that life goes on.

== History and critical response ==
Velthuijs first published Frog and the Birdsong in 1991 with Leopold, a Dutch publisher of children's books. It won the 1992 Gouden Griffel, one of the most significant Dutch prizes for children's books, and was a runner-up for the companion award for illustrations, the Gouden Penseel. By 2003, it was in its fourteenth printing. The book was digitized by the Digital Library for Dutch Literature and is available online. It is translated into English and published by Andersen Press.

== Educational and therapeutic use ==
Children often first encounter death in animals, and many children's books have used animal characters to explain death since that helps to create a certain distance which children consider less threatening, according to Nicholas Tucker in The Child and the Book. Frog and the Birdsong takes the reader through the rituals associated with death and ends on an optimistic note with the resumption of normalcy, symbolized by the birdsong. The book is suggested by many educational specialists as recommended reading for children to acquaint them with death, as reading material and as classroom prompts for activities.

In Dutch schools it has found frequent use in the classroom. In Pondering: 49 philosophical questions from children, Frog and the Birdsong is the selected reading for a group session on what it means to be dead. It is frequently suggested to prompt children to discuss death and their feelings about it, even in a school for deaf children, accompanied by sign language. In a school for special education the book is also used in memorial services.

== See also ==
- Duck, Death and the Tulip
- The Dead Bird
