= Elmer the Patchwork Elephant =

Book by David McKee

- Book cover for Elmer the Patchwork Elephant
- Author: David McKee
- Illustrator: David McKee
- Language: English
- No. of books: 44 (List of books)

Elmer the Patchwork Elephant (often shortened to Elmer) is a children's picture book series by the British author David McKee.

== The books ==
Elmer was first published by Dobson Books in 1968, and re-issued with re-drawn illustrations in a slightly shortened version by Andersen Press in 1989. It was inspired by the mascot of the Bordeaux Zoo (which closed in 1974) in France. The books are published in the United Kingdom by Andersen Press and were published in the United States by HarperCollins originally, Andersen Press USA now publishes in America. Forty-one book titles have been created since 1989, including over 30 original picture book stories, and the series has sold more than twelve million copies in sixty languages around the world. Satoshi Kitamura carried out the Japanese translation. Kim yang-mi carried out the Korean translation.

=== Themes ===
The main character is a multicoloured elephant named Elmer, with square patches of different colours that look like a patchwork quilt.

The stories are suitable for early exploration of cultural diversity. One day, Elmer decides that he wants to look like all the other elephants as he is tired of being different, and paints himself grey in order to 'blend in'. Once painted, the other elephants and jungle creatures no longer recognise him. He returns to the herd and the other elephants stand quietly until Elmer can't take the quiet any more. He lifts his trunk and then, at the top of his voice, shouts "Boo!", which unknowingly surprises the other elephants. The other elephants immediately realise that the grey elephant must be Elmer and applaud him for his best joke ever. When it begins to rain, the grey paint that Elmer has covered himself with starts to disappear, and Elmer's "true colours" are revealed, much to the delight of his friends, who preferred his multicoloured and fun loving personality. Following their happy reunion, the elephants reassure Elmer that they love him because of his differences, and not in spite of them, and they celebrate by painting themselves in multicoloured paint (and Elmer paints himself elephant colour), in recognition of Elmer's unique appearance and personality.

== Merchandise ==
Elmer the Patchwork Elephant also features in a wide range of merchandising. His first story is also featured and animated as a short film in Anytime Tales, a storytelling animated programme narrating five of David McKee and Tony Ross' stories produced in 1991 by Abbey Home Entertainment. The story of Elmer was originally narrated by British voice actor Johnny Morris, who died on 6 May 1999, aged 82. Sophie Aldred also read his first story which was also animated by Mike Hibbert in an episode of Words and Pictures from 1993, featuring the letter E.

== Musical stage ==
A musical stage version created by Jonathan Rockefeller was adapted by Suzanne Maynard Miller, with songs by Allison Leyton-Brown. After an initial engagement in Toronto, produced by Joseph Patrick (December 2017), Elmer the Patchwork Elephant show embarked upon a tour of the UK in January 2019.

== Titles ==
- 1. Elmer (1989; originally published in 1968)
- 2. Elmer Again (1991)
- 3. Elmer on Stilts (1993)
- 4. Elmer and Wilbur (1994)
- 5. Elmer's Colours (1994)
- 6. Elmer's Day (1994)
- 7. Elmer's Friends (1994)
- 8. Elmer's Weather (1994)
- 9. Elmer in the Snow (1995)
- 10. The Elmer Pop-Up Book (1996)
- 11. Elmer and the Wind (1997)
- 12. Elmer Plays Hide and Seek (1997)
- 13. Elmer and the Lost Teddy (1999)
- 14. Elmer and the Stranger (2000)
- 15. Look! There's Elmer (2000)
- 16. Elmer and Grandpa Eldo (2001)
- 17. Elmer's Concert (2001)
- 18. Elmer and Butterfly (2002)
- 19. Elmer's New Friend (2002)
- 20. Elmer and the Hippos (2003)
- 21. Elmer's Jigsaw Book (2003)
- 22. Elmer and Snake (2004)
- 23. Elmer and Rose (2005)
- 24. Elmer and Aunt Zelda (2006)
- 25. Elmer's Baby Record Book (2006)
- 26. Elmer and the Rainbow (2007)
- 27. Elmer's First Counting Book (2007)
- 28. Elmer's Opposites (2007)
- 29. Elmer and the Big Bird (2008)
- 30. Elmer's Special Day (2009)
- 31. Elmer and Papa Red (2010)
- 32. Elmer and Super El (2011)
- 33. Elmer, Rose and Super El (2012)
- 34. Elmer and the Whales (2013)
- 35. Elmer And The Monster (2015)
- 36. Elmer's Christmas (2015)
- 37. Elmer and the Race (2016)
- 38. Elmer and the Flood (2016)
- 39. Elmer and the Tune (2017)
- 40. Elmer's Walk (2018)
- 41. Elmer's Birthday (2019)
- 42. Elmer and the Lost Treasure (2020)
- 43. Elmer and the Bedtime Story (2021)
- 44. Elmer and the Gift (2022)
- 45. Elmer and the White Bear (2025)
- 46. Elmer and the Tug of War (2026)

== Reception ==
The stories are suitable for early exploration of the themes and issues relating to the concept of Diversity. 28 May 2016 was declared Elmer's Day by publisher Andersen Press. Libraries and bookshops across Britain held Elmer themed events.
