= 's Nachts =

Children's book by Wolf Erlbruch

German cover, Nachts

's Nachts ("At Night," 1999), translated in German as Nachts, is a children's book written and illustrated by German author Wolf Erlbruch written for the Dutch Kinderboekenweek, an annual event promoting children's literature. It is a story about a boy, Fons, who, unable to sleep, drags his father on a walk through town and encounters the most fantastic animals and creatures. Some of the things Fons sees along the way were specifically geared toward the Dutch reader, Erlbruch explained.

For his mixed-media illustrations in Nachts, Erlbruch used cut-outs from stacks of papers from 1940s German wallpaper and other eclectic sources. Each page features a moon, and some of those were cut from plans from a French company for a railroad in China; the mathematical formulas, explained Erlbruch, represent the adult, rational world—cutting up papers with such calculations on it he suspects is an act of rebellion. The Dutch daily newspaper Trouw wrote that in Nachts, Erlbruch "cuts, pastes, draws, paints, and writes a beautiful little piece of art."
