= Jeanne Willis =

English author

- Born: 5 November 1959 (age 66); St Albans, England
- Spouse: Ian James Wilcock (m. 1989)
- Children: 2
- Writing career
- Notable works: The Monster Bed (1986); Dr. Xargle series (1988–2004)

Jeanne Willis (born 5 November 1959) is an English author of several children's books, including The Monster Bed (1986) and the Dr. Xargle's Book of... series (1988–2004). Willis was also a contributor to the authorised Winnie-the-Pooh sequel, The Best Bear in All the World.

== Biography ==
Willis was born 5 November 1959, in St Albans, England to David Alfred and Dorothy Hilda Celia Willis, both of whom were teachers. She attended Watford College of Art, where she received a diploma in advertising writing in 1979. She married Ian James Wilcock on 26 May 1989, and the couple has two children.

As both a child and adult, Willis has had an active imagination, which has sometimes resulted in psychic distress. For instance, she remembers a time as a child when she would believe "wolves were following [her] home from school, so [she'd] arrive back sweating". As an adult, she ended up in Cromwell Hospital's psychiatric ward while she was working in a creative position at an advertising agency. After her hospitalization, she began writing full-time.

== Awards and honours ==
In January 2004, The Guardian named Willis their Author of the Month. In October 2011, they included Willis's Big Bad Bun on their list of recommended reading for children aged 5–7.

Awards for Willis's writing
Year	Title	Award	Result	Ref.
1995	The Rascally Cake	Red House Children's Book Award for Picture Book	Winner	
2003	Naked Without a Hat	Whitbread Award for Children's Book	Shortlist	
2003	Tadpole's Promise	Nestlé Smarties Book Prize (0–5 years)	Silver	
2006	Tadpole's Promise	"Off the Cuff" Award for Best Plot Twist	Winner	
2007	Who's In The Loo?	Red House Children's Book Award for Younger Children	Winner	
2007	Grill Pan Eddy	Booktrust Early Years Award for Pre-School Book	Shortlist	
2008	The Bog Baby	Booktrust Early Years Award for Pre-School Book	Winner	
2008	There's An Ouch in My Pouch!	Booktrust Early Years Award for Pre-School Book	Shortlist	
2010	Bottoms Up!	Red House Children's Book Award for Younger Children	Winner	

== Publications ==
=== Standalone books ===
- The Tale of Georgie Grub, Andersen Press, 1981, Holt, 1982.
- The Tale of Fearsome Fritz, Andersen Press, 1982, Holt, 1983.
- The Tale of Mucky Mabel, Andersen Press, 1984.
- The Monster Bed, illus. by Susan Varley, Andersen Press, 1986, Lothrop, 1987.
- The Long Blue Blazer, illus. by Susan Varley, Andersen Press, 1987, Dutton, 1988.
- Toffee Pockets, illus. by George Buchanan, Bodley Head, 1992.
- In Search of the Hidden Giant, illus. by Ruth Brown, Andersen Press, 1993,
  - Republished as In Search of the Giant, Dutton, 1994.
- The Lion's Roar, illus. by Derek Collin, Ginn, 1994.
- The Rascally Cake, illus. by Paul Korky, Andersen Press, 1994.
- Two Sea Songs, Ginn, 1994.
- Tom's Lady of the Lamp, illus. by Amy Burch, Macdonald Young, 1995.
- The Princess and the Parlour Maid, illus. by Pauline Hazelwood, Macdonald Young, 1995.
- Wilbur and Orville Take Off, illus. by Roger Wade Walker, Macdonald Young, 1995.
- Dolly Dot, Ginn, 1995.
- Flower Pots and Forget-Me-Nots, Ginn, 1995.
- The Pet Person, illus. by Tony Ross, Andersen Press, 1996, Dial, 1996.
- The Pink Hare, illus. by Ken Brown, Andersen Press, 1996.
- What Do You Want to Be, Brian, illus. by Mary Rees, Andersen Press, 1996.
- Sloth's Shoes, illus. by Tony Ross, Andersen Press, 1997, Kane/Miller (Brooklyn, NY), 1998.
- The Wind in the Wallows, illus. by Tony Ross, Andersen Press, 1998.
- The Boy Who Lost His Belly Button, illus. by Tony Ross, Andersen Press, 1999, Dorling Kindersley, 2000.
- Susan Laughs, illus. by Tony Ross, Andersen Press, 1999, Henry, 2000.
- Tinkerbill, illus. by Paul Cox, Collins Publishers, 1999.
- Parrot Goes to Playschool, illus. by Mark Birchall, Andersen Press, 2000, published as Be Quiet, Parrot, Carolrhoda, 2000.
- What Did I Look Like When I Was a Baby, illus. by Tony Ross, Putnam Press, 2000.
- Take Turns, Penguin, illus. by Mark Birchall, Carolrhoda, 2000.
- Be Gentle, Python, illus. by Mark Birchall, Carolrhoda, 2001.
- No Biting, Panther, illus. by Mark Birchall, Carolrhoda, 2001.
- No Biting, Puma, illus. by Mark Birchall, Carolrhoda, 2001.
- Do Little Mermaids Wet Their Beds, illus. by Penelope Jossen, Albert Whitman, 2001.
- Don't Let Go, illus. by Tony Ross, Andersen Press, 2002, G.P. Putnam's Sons, 2003.
- The Truth or Something, Henry Holt & Co., 2002, originally published in England as The Hard Man of the Swings.
- The Boy Who Thought He Was a Teddy Bear: A Fairy Tale, illus. by Susan Varley, Peachtree, 2002.
- I Want to Be a Cowgirl, illus. by Tony Ross, Henry Holt & Co., 2002.
- Sleepover!: The Best Ever Party Kit, illus. by Lydia Monks, Candlewick Press, 2002.
- Rocket Science, Faber & Faber, 2002.
- Naked without a Hat, Faber & Faber, 2003, Delacorte
- When Stephanie Smiled, illus. by Penelope Jossen, Andersen Press, 2003.
- Adventures of Jimmy Scar, Andersen Press, 2003.
- New Shoes, Andersen Press, 2003.
- The Beast of Crowsfoot Cottage, Macmillan Children's Books, 2003.
- I Hate School, illus. by Tony Ross, Atheneum Books for Young Readers, 2004.
- Shhh, illus. by Tony Ross, Hyperion Books for Children, 2004.
- The Magic Potty Show with Trubble and Trixie, illus. by Edward Eaves, Pan MacMillan, 2004.
- Bits, Boobs and Blobs, illus. by Lydia Monks, Walker Books, 2004.
- Snogs, Sex and Soulmates, illus. by Lydia Monks, Walker Books, 2004.
- Zitz, Glitz and Body Blitz, illus. by Lydia Monks, Walker Books, 2004.
- Manky Monkey, illustrated by Tony Ross, Andersen Press, 2004.
- Operation Itchy, illus. by Penny Dann, Candlewick Press, 2005.
- Secret Fairy Talent Show, illus. by Penny Dann, Orchard Books, 2005.
- Misery Moo, illus. by Tony Ross, Henry Holt & Co., 2005.
- Tadpole's Promise, illus. by Tony Ross, Atheneum Books for Young Readers, 2005.
- Never Too Little to Love, illus. by Jan Fearnley, Candlewick Press, 2005.
- Dumb Creatures, illus. by Nicola Slater, Macmillan Children's Books, 2005.
- Daft Bat, illus. by Tony Ross, Andersen Press, 2006.
- Gorilla! Gorilla, illus. by Tony Ross, Atheneum Books for Young Readers, 2006.
- Really Rude Rhino, illus. by Tony Ross, Andersen Press, 2006.
- Dozy Mare, Andersen Press, 2006.
- Mayfly Day, Andersen Press, 2006.
- Rat Heaven, Macmillan Children's Books, 2006.
- Grill Pan Eddy, illus. by Tony Ross, Andersen Press, 2007.
- Who's in the Bathroom, illus. by Adrian Reynolds, Simon & Schuster Books for Young Readers, 2007.
- Delilah D. at the Library, illus. by Rosie Reeve, Clarion Books, 2007.
- Killer Gorilla, Andersen Press, 2007.
- Blue Monster Wants It All, illus. by Jenni Desmond, Little Tiger, 2018.
- The Monster Storm, illus. by Susan Varley, Andersen Press, Lothrop, 1995.

=== "Crazy Jobs" series ===
The "Crazy Jobs" books are illustrated by Korky Paul and published by Orchard Books.

- Annie the Gorilla Nanny, 2005.
- Gabby the Vampire Cabby, 2005.
- Jeff, the Witch's Chef, 2005.
- Lillibet, the Monster Vet, 2005.
- Norman the Demon Doorman, 2005.
- Vanessa, the Werewolf Hairdresser, 2005.
- Bert the Fairies' Fashion Expert, 2005.
- Iddy Bogey the Ogre Yogi, 2005.

=== Dr. Xargle series ===
The Dr. Xargle books are illustrated by Tony Ross. They were published by Anderson in England and E. P. Dutton in the United States.

- Dr. Xargle's Book of Earthlets, 1988 (England)
  - Republished as Earthlets, as Explained by Professor Xargle, 1989 (USA)
- Dr. Xargle's Book of Earth Hounds, Translated into Human, 1989 (England)
  - Republished as Earth Hounds, as Explained by Professor Xargle, 1990 (USA)
- Dr. Xargle's Book of Earth Tiggers, Translated into Human, 1990 (England)
  - Republished as Earth Tigerlets, as Explained by Professor Xargle, 1991 (USA)
- Dr. Xargle's Book of Earth Mobiles, Translated into Human, 1991 (England)
  - Republished as Earth Mobiles, as Explained by Professor Xargle, 1992 (USA)
- Dr. Xargle's Book of Earth Weather, Translated into Human, 1992 (England)
  - Republished as Earth Weather, as Explained by Professor Xargle, 1993 (USA)
- Dr. Xargle's Book of Earth Relations, 1993 (England)
  - Republished as Relativity, as Explained by Professor Xargle, 1994 (USA)
