= Robert Leeson =

British writer

- Born: Robert Arthur Leeson; 31 March 1928; Northwich, Cheshire
- Died: 29 September 2013 (aged 85)
- Occupations: Novelist, journalist
- Spouse: Gunver Leeson (m.1954)
- Children: 2
- Writing career
- Years active: 1971 – 2003
- Genre: Children's literature
- Notable awards: Eleanor Farjeon Award (1985)

Robert Arthur Leeson (31 March 1928, Northwich, Cheshire – 29 September 2013) was an English author, mainly known for his children's books. Before becoming a writer, he worked as Literary Editor of the left-wing British newspaper the Morning Star.

Leeson was a prolific writer, having had more than 70 books for young people published between 1973 and 2003. His books include several historical novels, such as Beyond the Dragon Prow, about a crippled Viking boy. Leeson produced a trilogy about a British family in the sixteenth and seventeenth centuries: Maroon Boy (1974), Bess, and The White Horse (1977). The White Horse revolves around a young man who fights on the Roundhead side during the English Civil War. Leeson also wrote The Third Class Genie (1975) (a humorous fantasy novel), and the science-fiction Time Rope (1986) and Zania Experiment (1993) series. Leeson wrote social realist novels such as It's My Life (1980), about a teenage girl who has to look after her family after her mother walks out on them. Silver's Revenge is a humorous sequel to Treasure Island, and Candy for the King is a fairytale about a giant influenced by Voltaire's Candide. Leeson's Reading and Righting: the past, present and future of Fiction for the young (1985) is a history of children's literature. He also wrote for radio, television and the theatre.

== Bibliography ==
- United We Stand (1971)
- Strike (1973)
- Beyond the Dragon Prow (1973)
- Maroon Boy (1974)
- The Third Class Genie (1975)
- The Demon Bike Rider (1976)
- Children's Books and Class Society (1977)
- The White Horse (1977)
- The Cimaroons (1978)
- Challenge in the Dark (1978)
- Silver's Revenge (1978)
- Travelling Brothers (1979)
- It's My Life (1980)
- Harold and Bella, Jammy and Me (1980)
- Bess (1983)
- Candy for King (1983)
- The People's Dream (1983)
- Mum and Dad's Big Business (1983)
- Genie on the Loose (1984)
- The Adventures of Baxter and Co. (1984)
- Reading and Righting: The Past, Present and Future of Fiction for the young (1985)
- Time Rope (1986)
- Wheel of Danger (1986)
- At War With Tomorrow (1986)
- Three Against the World (1986)
- The Metro Gangs Attack (1986)
- The Reversible Giant (1986)
- Slambash Wangs of a Compo Gormer (1987)
- Never Kiss Frogs (1988)
- Burper (1989)
- How Alice Saved Captain Miracle (1989)
- Hey Robin (1989)
- Right Royal Kidnap (1990)
- Jan Alone (1990)
- Fire on the Cloud (1991)
- Coming Home (1991)
- One Frog Too Many (1991)
- Pancake Pickle (1991)
- Landing in Cloud Valley (1991)
- April Fool at Hob Lane School (1991)
- Never Kiss Frogs (1992)
- No Sleep for Hob Lane (1993)
- Karlo's Tale (1993)
- Hide And Seek (1993)
- The Last Genie (1993)
- Ghosts at Hob Lane (1993)
- Smart Girls (1993)
- Deadline (1993)
- Danger Trail (1993)
- Blast Off! (1993)
- The Dog Who Changed the World (1994)
- The Story of Robin Hood (1994)
- Swapper (1994)
- All the Gold in the World (1995)
- Red, White and Blue (1995)
- The Amazing Adventures of Idle Jack (1995)
- Smart Girls Forever (1996)
- Lucky Lad! (1997)
- Doomwater (1997)
- Geraldine Gets Lucky (1997)
- Tom's Private War (1998)
- Trwco (1998)
- Why's the Cow on the Roof? (1999)
- Liar (1999)
- The Song of Arthur (2000)
- Ruth (2000)
- My sister Shahrazad: Tales from the Arabian Nights (2001)
- Tom's War Patrol (2001)
- Tom's War (2003) (Omnibus of Tom's Private War and Tom's War Patrol).
- Partners in Crime (2003)
- Onda, Wind-Rider (2003)

== TV tie-ins ==
- Grange Hill Rules OK? (1980).
- Grange Hill Goes Wild (1980).
- Grange Hill for Sale (1981). Novel
- Grange Hill Home and Away (1982).
- Forty Days of Tucker J., 1983.
