= Klaus Flugge =

British publisher (born 1934)

- Born: 1934 (age 90–91); Hamburg, Germany
- Occupation: Publisher
- Known for: Founder of Andersen Press (1999)
- Awards: Eleanor Farjeon Award; London Book Fair (LBF) Lifetime Achievement Award (2023)

Klaus Flugge (born 1934) is a German-born British publisher, founder in 1976 of the London-based children's book publishing company Andersen Press. He was awarded the 2023 London Book Fair Lifetime Achievement Award.

== Biography ==
Klaus Flugge was born in Hamburg, Germany, in 1934. After being apprenticed to a bookshop, he attended Book Trade School in Leipzig. At the age of 23, he migrated to America as an East German refugee, speaking only German and Russian. He had various jobs, and spent two years as an American GI, before he began working as personal assistant to Lew Schwartz, owner of the New York publishing company Abelard-Schuman. Schwartz suggested 18 months later that Flugge relocated to Europe to focus on building their small list there, and in 1961 Flugge went to London. In the autumn of 1976, he launched Andersen Press – named after Hans Christian Andersen. Authors he published include David McKee, Tony Ross, Satoshi Kitamura, Quentin Blake and Chris Riddell.

In 1999, Flugge received the Eleanor Farjeon Award for distinguished service to the world of British children's books, the first publisher to be honoured, and he was also the first publisher to be awarded Honorary Membership of the Youth Libraries Group.

In 2016, in honour of the 40th anniversary of Anderson Press, the Klaus Flugge Prize was launched, an award for the most promising and exciting newcomer to children's book illustration.

Flugge is the recipient of the 2023 London Book Fair (LBF) Lifetime Achievement Award.
