= Peters Bookselling Services =

Coordinates: 52.472575°N 1.897815°W

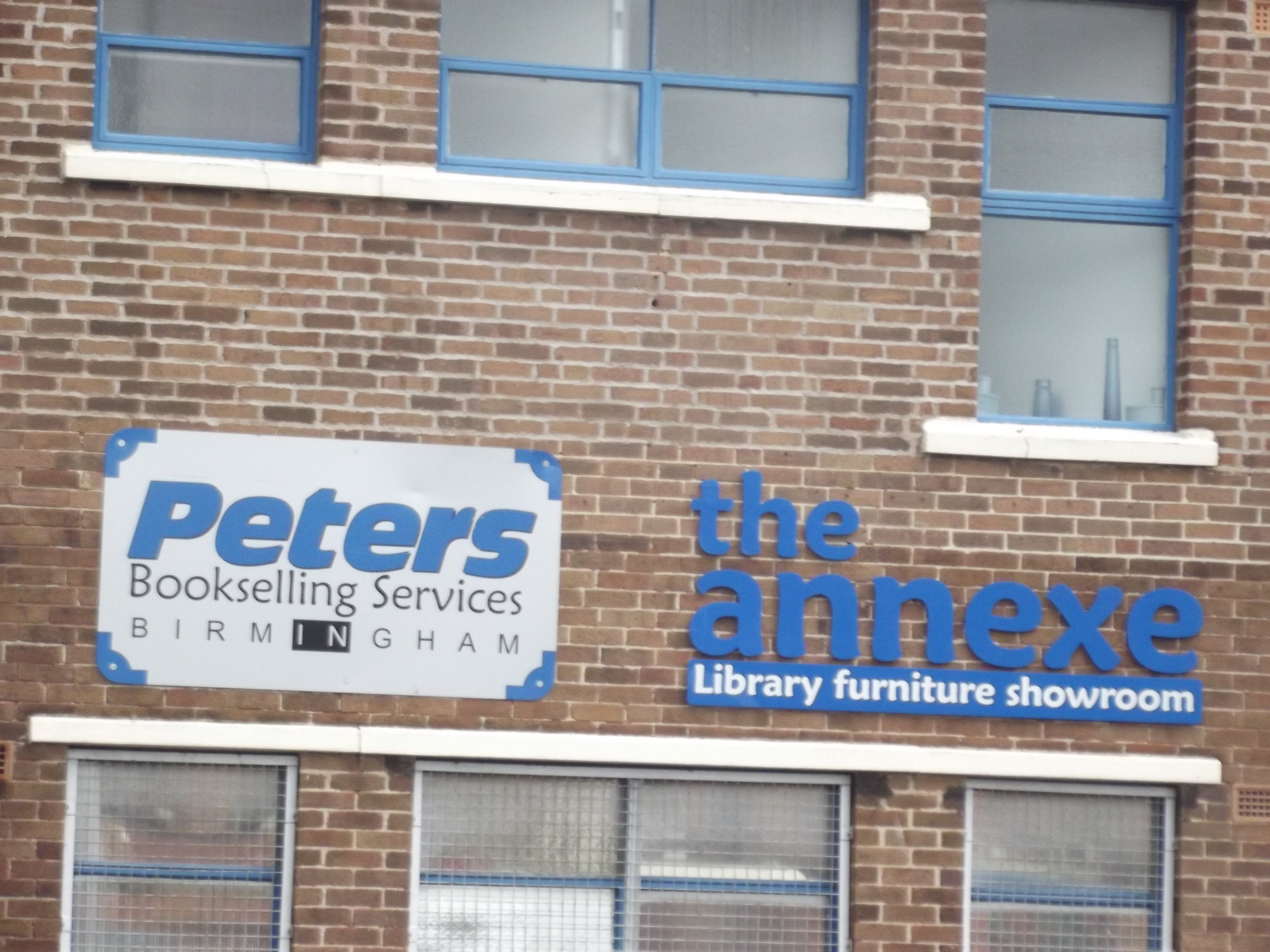
Building sign

Peters Bookselling Services is a wholly owned subsidiary of J S Peters & Son Ltd., a family run business operating in the children's book selling market, and is based in Birmingham, England.

== History ==
J S Peters & Son Ltd. have been involved in library supply and general bookselling since 1935 with the opening of their first shop in Moor Street, Birmingham by John Sheldon Peters.

A move to Thorp Street in 1962 saw Malcolm Peters join the company, the 3rd generation of the Peters family, where he built up the business by selling books to schools and colleges. A requirement in 1989 to house the Birmingham Royal Ballet on the Thorp Street site, meant the company moved to much larger premises nearby on Bromsgrove Street, providing 35,000 square feet (3,300 m^{2}) of showroom and offices. The company is still controlled by the Peters family, being wholly owned by Malcolm Peters and his two sons. Malcolm retired in 2009 and his son Rhydian replaced him as chairman, becoming the fourth generation of the family.

In 1983 under Malcolm's instigation, Peters Library Service was launched as a subsidiary company, to re-establish the company as a specialist children's library bookseller still based in Birmingham.

Moira Arthur was appointed managing director in 1999, following the change of name of the subsidiary company to Peters Bookselling Services. Moira retired in August 2009 and has since received both the Eleanor Farjeon Award and been awarded an MBE in the Queen's Birthday Honours List 2010 after 31 years in library supply specialising in children's books. Carl McInerney joined Peters in 2009 as its new managing director. In January 2011, Ray Dyer was appointed managing director of the business, having worked with the company for 15 years.

Peters Bookselling Services is now the only dedicated children's specialist supplier in the country, following the acquisition of its competitors by larger wholesaler businesses.

In 1994 a further subsidiary, The Kit Shop, was launched to supply furniture to libraries and schools, to complement the book supply side of the business. The Kit Shop is located a short distance from the main offices in The Annexe on Kent Street.

== Peters' Book of the Year ==
In 2010 Peters Bookselling Services launched their Book of the Year award. Nominations are selected by Peters' own librarians, with the criteria that the book be classed as a children's book and have been published during the nomination year. Voting is by readers of the company's weekly online publication, eGazette. The winner is announced in January the following year.

- 2010 White Crow by Marcus Sedgwick

Peters Bookselling Services currently sponsor the School Library Association Information Book Award.
