= Dead Birds =

Dead Birds may refer to:

- Dead Birds (1963 film), a documentary film by Robert Gardner
- Dead Birds (2004 film), an American horror film directed by Alex Turner

== See also ==
- Dead Bird (disambiguation)
