= David McKee =

British writer and illustrator (1935–2022)

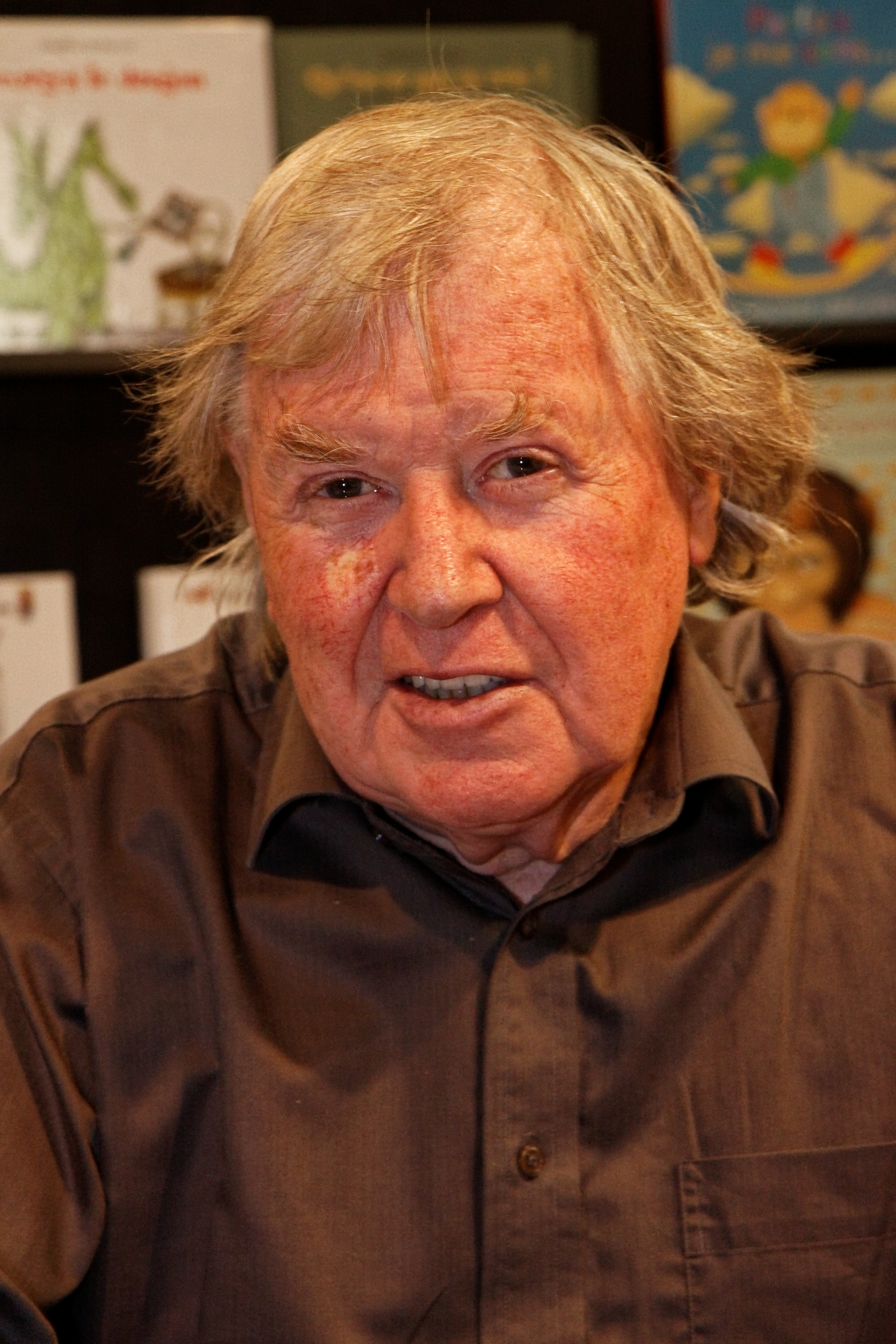
- McKee at the Montreuil Book Festival in 2011
- Born: David John McKee; 2 January 1935; Plymouth, Devon, England
- Died: 6 April 2022 (aged 87); Provence, France
- Occupations: Author, illustrator
- Notable work: Elmer the Patchwork Elephant; Mr Benn; Not Now, Bernard

David John McKee (2 January 1935 – 6 April 2022), was a British writer and illustrator, chiefly of children's books and animations.

For his contribution as a children's illustrator, he was UK nominee for the biennial international Hans Christian Andersen Award in 2006.

== Early life ==
David John McKee was born on 2 January 1935 in Plymouth, Devon, and raised in Tavistock. After attending grammar school, he studied at Plymouth College of Art.

While still at college, he began selling one-off cartoons, particularly to the national press. On leaving college, he continued this to support himself while painting, drawing regularly for, among others, Punch, Reader's Digest, and The Times Educational Supplement.

The first book he sold was of a story he had told at college, Two Can Toucan. It is about a toucan who can carry two cans of paint on its enormous bill. This was published by Abelard-Schuman in 1964; a 1985 edition with new illustrations by McKee was re-issued in 2001 by Andersen Press.

== Writer and illustrator ==
McKee produced several characters who formed the basis of book series, including Elmer the Patchwork Elephant. Elmer was first published by Dobson Books in 1968, and was re-issued by Andersen Press in 1989. His 29 Elmer books have sold more than 10 million copies and have appeared in more than 60 languages being adapted as a stage play and an animated series. The character has spawned a range of merchandise, including soft toys, from London Emblem and Elmer board books. McKee illustrated the songs "Toy Boy" and "Lonely Alcoholic" in singer-songwriter Mika's extended play Songs for Sorrow.

He illustrated books by other authors, including some of the more recent Paddington Bear books. He also illustrated books written by his mother, Violet McKee, and by his son, Chuck McKee.

McKee also published books under the pseudonym Violet Easton.

== Films and television ==
The BBC used some of McKee's books on television and asked about the possibility of a more extensive project. The result was the development of a series about one of McKee's characters, the resulting series was Mr Benn, which ran for thirteen episodes first broadcast in 1971 and 1972 and was repeated regularly over the following two decades. Five films for the Save the Children fund followed, then a series of films based on the King Rollo books, with two friends, Clive Juster and Leo Nielsen. The company King Rollo Films was started. The company maintained its success, with McKee being involved on projects usually as a writer. They have been responsible for various films, including Tony Ross's Towser and Eric Hill's Spot the Dog.

King Rollo Films has produced many other animations, including the animated stories within the BBC's children's programme Fimbles.

== Personal life and honours ==
McKee had homes in London and the south of France where he lived with his partner Bakhta, a French-Algerian art-dealer. He shared with her an interest in collecting drawings and African tribal art. He won the Deutscher Jugendliteraturpreis in 1987. His previous wife was Barbara Ennuss, with whom he had three children. He was awarded a BookTrust Lifetime Achievement Award in 2020, in recognition of his whole body of work. He declared it a "shock" but "fantastic", and said he had "never been one for the spotlight or winning awards". McKee was awarded an Honorary Doctorate of Arts from Plymouth College of Art in 2011.

Each year, instead of Christmas cards, McKee would send handmade New Year's greeting envelopes to relatives and friends, typically on a theme of surprises to come or a farewell to the previous year. Children's book publisher, Klaus Flugge documented some of the illustrated envelopes he was sent by artists, including McKee, in 2011.

=== Death ===
McKee died after a short illness in Provence, France, on 6 April 2022, aged 87.

== Legacy ==
An exhibition "Elmer and Mr Benn: the magic of David McKee" ran at St Barbe Museum & Art Gallery in Hampshire from July to September in 2026.

== Bibliography ==
- Bronto's Wings (1964)
- Two Can Toucan (1964)
- The Poor Farmer and the Robber Knights (1969)
- Mr Benn (1970)
- Six Men (1972, 2011) ISBN 978-0-7358-4050-8
- The Magician and the Sorcerer (1974) ISBN 0-8193-0772-6
- Tusk Tusk (1978) ISBN 0-916291-28-6
- King Rollo and the Bread (1979) ISBN 0-316-56044-8
- King Rollo and the New Shoes (1979) ISBN 0-316-56044-8
- King Rollo and the Birthday (1979) ISBN 0-316-56044-8
- Not Now, Bernard (1980) ISBN 0-05-004559-8
- I Hate My Teddybear (1983)
- King Rollo and the Letter (1984)
- The Hill and the Rock (1984)
- Two Monsters (1985)
- The Sad Story of Veronica (1987)
- Snow Woman (1987)
- Who's a Clever Baby Then? (1988)
- Elmer (1989) ISBN 0-688-09171-7
- The Monster and the Teddy Bear (1989)
- Elmer Again (1991)
- Zebra's Hiccups (1991)
- Elmer on Stilts (1993)
- The School Bus Comes At 8 O’clock (1993)
- Elmer and Wilbur (1994) ISBN 0-06-075239-4
- Isabel's Noisy Tummy (1994)
- Elmer in the Snow (1995)
- Charlotte's Piggy Bank (1996)
- The Elmer Pop up Book (1996)
- Elmer and the Wind (1997)
- Prince Peter and the Teddy Bear (1997)
- Elmer Plays Hide and Seek (1998)
- Elmer and the Lost Teddy (1999)
- Mary's Secret (1999)
- Elmer and the Stranger (2000)
- Look! There's Elmer (2000)
- Elmer and Grandpa Eldo (2001)
- King Rollo and the New Stockings (2001)
- Mr Benn – Gladiator (2001)
- Elmer's Concert (2001)
- Elmer and Butterfly (2002)
- Elmer's New Friend (2002)
- Elmer and the Hippos (2003)
- The Adventures of Charmin the Bear (illustrated By Joanna Quinn, 2003)
- Who is Mrs. Green? (2003)
- The Conquerors (2004)
- Denver (2010)
- Elmer's Walk (2018)
