= Duck, Death and the Tulip =

2007 children's book by Wolf Erlbruch

- Author: Wolf Erlbruch
- Original title: Ente, Tod und Tulpe
- Illustrator: Wolf Erlbruch
- Language: German, English
- Genre: Children's picture book
- Publication place: Germany

Duck, Death and the Tulip (German title: Ente, Tod und Tulpe) is a 2007 children's book by German author and illustrator Wolf Erlbruch. The book, which deals with death and the afterlife, has been translated into various languages, including Dutch and English, and was adapted in animated and movie format.

== Synopsis ==
The story involves a duck who acquaints a character called Death who, as it turns out, has been following her all her life. The two become friends, discussing life, death, and what any afterlife might be like. They go diving together and sit in a tree, pondering what would happen to the duck's lake after her death. The duck reports that some ducks say that they become angels and sit on clouds, looking down on earth. Death says that this is possible since ducks already have wings. Then, she says that some ducks also say that there is a hell, down below, where bad ducks are roasted; Death replies that it's remarkable what ducks all think of, and says "who knows," prompting the duck to respond, "so you don't know either." In the end, the duck indeed dies, and Death carries her to a river, placing the duck gently in the water and laying the tulip on her: "For a long time he watched her. When she was lost to sight, he was almost a little moved."

== Critical reception ==
The book was nominated for the 2008 Deutscher Jugendliteraturpreis; the jury praised Erlbruch's "soft-philosophical Pas de deux" and his sparse illustrations: "the radical reduction of the images underlines the dramatic subject matter in a fulminant manner." Meg Rosoff, in a review for The Guardian, called Duck, Death and the Tulip an "outstanding book": "There is something infinitely tender in the way Death strokes her ruffled feathers into place, lifts her body and places it gently in the river, watching as she drifts off into the distance." Sieglinde Duchateau, in a review of the Dutch translation, also praised the book: "The atmosphere is warm, intimate, and full of comfort. In the masterpiece a difficult theme is made accessible for children in an idiosyncratic manner with a touch of humor."

For his illustrations, Erlbruch received honorable mention in the 2008 Dutch Gouden Penseel competition for best children's book illustrations.

== Adaptations ==
An animated adaptation was directed by Matthias Bruhn; Death was voiced by Harry Rowohlt, Duck by Anna Thalbach. The film was nominated for the 2010 Cartoon d'or, and won the 2010 Animated Film Award at the SCHLINGEL International Film Festival. It opened the 2010 Lucas Filmfestival for children's films, and aired on the German television show Die Sendung mit der Maus.

In 2011, director Andrea Simon released a short film of the same name; in her version, two young sisters cope with the death of their mother by reading the book. The book itself is acted out by two dancers, "blending real characters with the story."

== See also ==
- Frog and the Birdsong
- The Dead Bird
