= Wendy Cooling =

British teacher

Wendy Ena Cooling, MBE (3 October 1941 – 21 June 2020) was a British teacher who founded Bookstart.
