= The Dead Bird (book) =

2016 children's book

- Cover art of The Dead Bird.
- Author: Margaret Wise Brown
- Illustrator: Remy Charlip
- Genre: Picture book
- Publication date: 1958

The Dead Bird is a children's book by Margaret Wise Brown. Brown's text copyright was 1938 but it was not published until 1958 (by Addison-Wesley Publishing) with illustrations by Remy Charlip; this was after Brown's 1952 death. The story was reissued in 2016 with new illustrations by Christian Robinson. The book tells the story of a group of children who find a recently dead (still warm) bird, and bury it with ceremony. Always seen as a "gentle", "standout" book about the emotions attached to death, the book benefits in the newer version from Robinson's "cinematic storytelling", set in a "a lush urban park" with "characters [who] are diverse in gender and ethnicity but universal in their emotions, curiosity, and playfulness".

== See also ==
- Frog and the Birdsong
- Duck, Death and the Tulip
