= The Story of the Little Mole Who Knew It Was None of His Business =

1989 German children's book

- Author: Werner Holzwarth; Wolf Erlbruch
- Original title: Vom kleinen Maulwurf, der wissen wollte, wer ihm auf den Kopf gemacht hat
- Genre: Children's literature
- Publisher: Peter Hammer Verlag
- Publication date: 1989
- Pages: 24
- ISBN: 978-1856021012 30th anniversary edition

The Story of the Little Mole Who Knew It Was None of His Business or The Story of the Little Mole Who Went in Search of Whodunit (German: Vom kleinen Maulwurf, der wissen wollte, wer ihm auf den Kopf gemacht hat, lit. 'About the little mole that wanted to know who 'made' [defecated] on his head') is a children's book by German children's authors Werner Holzwarth and Wolf Erlbruch. The book was first published by Peter Hammer Verlag in 1989; it was soon translated and became an international success.

== Synopsis ==
One day, a little mole who's just emerging from his hole gets pooped on his head by an unidentified animal; he sets out on a mission to find the culprit. The mole comes across a dove, a horse, a hare, a goat, a cow, and a pig, and they all poop to show what their feces looks like, and finally, the mole receives some assistance from two flies who help him identify the pooper: Hans-Heinerich in the German original (who is named Basil in The Story of the Little Mole Who Knew It Was None of His Business and Henry in The Story of the Little Mole Who Went in Search of Whodunit), the butcher's dog. The mole exacts his revenge by pooping on the dog's head, and returns to his hole happily.

== Reception ==
The book established the reputation of Erlbruch as an illustrator in the Netherlands, where it was deemed a "classic" in 2012 (and adapted for the stage).
