= Penny Dann =

British children's book illustrator

- Born: 30 June 1964; Slough, England
- Died: 20 December 2014 (aged 50); Brighton, England
- Education: Brighton College of Art
- Spouse: Tom Sanderson (m. 2014)

Penny Dann (30 June 1964 – 20 December 2014) was a British children's book illustrator and creator of The Secret Fairy. She was known for her "humorous and vivacious style". Alongside writing and illustrating her own works, she illustrated over 100 children's books.

== Biography ==
Dann was born 30 June 1964 in Slough, England to Julian and Jill Dann. She studied visual communication at the Brighton College of Art, where a tutor, Raymond Briggs, "encouraged her to develop her character drawings," which "became the basis of her later work". A piece shared at her end-of-degree show was published in 1985 as One of the Pot.

Following graduation, she remained in Brighton, though she lived in Sydney and Melbourne in the 1990s and early 2000s. After returning to Brighton, she met Tom Sanderson, "whom she married a few days before her death".

She died from cancer on 20 December 2014.

== Awards and honours ==
The Orchard Book of Nursery Rhymes for Your Baby (2010) was a best-selling book. The first book of Dann's Secret Fairy series sold over two million copies worldwide.
