= Elys Dolan =

Academic and children's book writer and illustrator

Elys Dolan is a children's book writer and illustrator, and lecturer at the Cambridge School of Art. She came in second for the Macmillan Prize for Children's Picture Book Illustration as a student. She won the Zena Sutherland Award for Excellence in Children's Literature 2015. Her books are typically humorous, and she illustrates primarily with ink.

== Work ==
Dolan's first book, Weasles (2013), was praised for its humour and for the wide age range to which it appealed. It was shortlisted for the 2013 Roald Dahl Funny Prize.

Her book Doughnut of Doom (2016) attracted controversy in 2018 over its treatment of food allergies. The main character, a peanut butter sandwich, saves the town by causing the villain, a giant doughnut, to have an allergic reaction. In response to complaints, the publisher Nosy Crow recalled and destroyed all copies of the book it was sent. Dolan subsequently revised the book, changing the story and some parts of the art to remove references to allergies, and a new version was published in 2019.

Mr Bunny's Chocolate Factory won Best Laugh Out Loud Picture Book at the 2018 LOLLIES awards. The book has been described as "political" and pro-union. How the Borks Became (2019), illustrated by Dolan and written by Jonathan Emmett, won Best Early Years Book in the STEAM Children's Book Prize for educating children about evolution.

Other works include Super Snail, The Haunted Farm, Steven Seagull, Nuts in Space, Knighthood for Beginners, and others.

== Personal life and education ==
She was educated at Ardingly College. Dolan has a BA in Fine Art, an MA Children's Book Illustration, and a Ph.D. in Children's Book Illustration (awarded 2020) from the Cambridge School of Art at Anglia Ruskin University.

Dolan collects pocket watches. She is partially deaf.
