= L.A. Weatherly =

American novelist

- Born: 1967 (age 58–59); Little Rock, Arkansas, U.S.
- Occupations: Writer, novelist
- Writing career
- Pen name: Lee Weatherly, Titania Woods
- Period: 2002-Present
- Genres: Young-adult, Supernatural, Science fiction, Fantasy, Romance
- Notable work: Angel Trilogy
- Website: www.leeweatherly.com

L.A. Weatherly (born 1967), also known as Lee Weatherly and Titania Woods, is an American author. She was born in 1967 and grew up in Little Rock, Arkansas in the USA. She lives with her husband in The Scottish Borders, UK. She has written over fifty books for children and young adults, though is best known for her YA trilogy Angel. The first title in the series, "Angel", was published in 2010. The second, Angel Fire, came out in 2012; the final title in the series, Angel Fever, was published in 2013.

Weatherly also has written several novels for teenagers, including Child X, Missing Abby, and Soul Mates.

Weatherly, under the pseudonym Titania Woods, has also written the notable series Glitterwings Academy for 5- to 8-year-olds. The collection contains 15 different, creative books in a sequence.

== Publications ==
=== Children's literature ===
- Glitterwings Academy (2008-2010)
- Pigwitchery (2008)
- The Scariest Monster in The World (2009)
- Pocket Cat Series (2010-2011)

=== Young Adult literature ===
- Child X (June 2002)
- Missing Abby (2004)
- Breakfast at Sadie's (2006)
- Kat Got Your Tongue (2007)
- Angel series
1. Angel Burn (January 2010)
2. Angel Fire (October 2011)
3. Angel Fever (August 2013)
- Broken Series (2016-2017)

=== Non-fiction ===
- Teach Yourself to Write a Blockbuster (2006)
