= Angel Trilogy =

2011 novel by L. A. Weatherly

Angel
- Angel Burn; Angel Fire; Angel Fever
- Author: L.A. Weatherly
- Country: United States, United Kingdom
- Language: English
- Genre: Fantasy, Romance, Young adult fiction, Thriller, Supernatural
- Publisher: Usborne Publishing (UK); Candlewick (US)
- Published: 2010 - 2013
- Media type: Print (hardcover and paperback)
- Followed by: Angel Fire

The Angel Trilogy is a romance, thriller, fantasy, and supernatural series of three books written by L.A. Weatherly. The first book, Angel, was first published in the United Kingdom on 1 October 2010 through Usborne Publishing and was later released in the United States as Angel Burn through Candlewick on 24 May 2011. The following two books, Angel Fire and Angel Fever, were also released by Candlewick in the United States and Usborne Publishing in the United Kingdom.

== Summary ==
=== Angel Burn/Angel ===
In the series angels are beings from another dimension, who crossed over to ours when the ether, their natural food source, started running out. To supplement it, they feed off humans' aura, causing serious long-term illnesses to their food sources. The feeding results in angel burn, which leaves humans fatigued, weak, and completely reverent of the angels. Willow is a sixteen-year-old girl who has psychic powers that tell her (on physical contact) a person's past and all the possible futures of that person; she meets Alex, who is an Angel Killer (shortened to AK in the book) who has been sent to her house to kill her. However, when he sees Willow's angel form and realizes that it doesn't have a halo, which is the angels energy store for the energy that they take from the humans, he also observes a picture of Willow when she was a child and takes it as proof that Willow's not an angel since angels don't have childhoods.

He follows Willow as she goes to a Church of Angels to talk one of her friends, who has severe angel burn, out of joining but the visit sets off a chain of events resulting in all the church of angel members looking for her, eager for her death. Alex tells Willow that while her mother was a human, her father was an angel. They both head toward New Mexico to meet Cully, an old friend of Alex's. On the way, the car breaks down and they need to stop at a motel while the mechanic looks for the correct parts. Alex and Willow go to a restaurant where Willow 'reads' the waitress and stops her from committing suicide by telling her about the bright future which she would have if she didn't kill herself, she also convinces one of her colleagues to keep an eye on her. This action makes Alex trust her a bit.

The journey to New Mexico is fairly uneventful apart from the fact that while Willow and Alex fall in love with each other, both are oblivious to the other's feelings. They arrive at camp, where Alex had lived before the Invasion. He tells Willow how his father started the camp and how they used to hunt in groups of four, how a hunt could take over a week. How, when the Invasion occurred, the CIA took over due to the sudden jump in the number of angels and they all had to break any contact with each other, how the angel spotters sent them texts with the addresses of the angels. The camp was seemingly deserted as Alex told Willow about life at camp and he recounted years of pillow fights with his elder brother, Jake. He tells Willow how the angels killed his mother, brother, and father. Just then they hear a truck pulling up and Cully appears. After a while, they both realize that Cully is suffering from an angel burn and they have to fight off five angels with the help of Willow's angel who came out to protect Alex.

Alex takes Willow to a hut in the mountains where they finally get together and they remain there for a few months. On Willow's birthday, Alex presents her with a beautiful necklace and encourages her to contact her angel. When Willow does, the Church of Angels uses the energy to pinpoint the location but, a spy leaks the information to the only people in Project Angel without an angel burn and these two people, one human Sophia and one angel Nate who believes that his kind doesn't have the right to feed off another species, come and propose a plan to end the angel problem for once and for all. They say that they need Willow's help as she can be at two places at once and Willow agrees, the plan goes horribly wrong and Nate is killed. Another wave of angels arrives and Willow and Alex Kylar escape.

== Books ==
1. Angel (2010, Usborne Publishing, released in 2011 as Angel Burn, Candlewick)
2. Angel Fire (2011, Usborne Publishing, 2012, Candlewick)
3. Angel Fever (2013, Usborne Publishing, Candlewick)
