= Wolf Erlbruch =

German illustrator and writer (1948–2022)

- Born: 30 June 1948; Wuppertal, Allied-occupied Germany
- Died: 11 December 2022 (aged 74); Wuppertal, Germany
- Education: Folkwang Hochschule
- Occupations: Illustrator and writer of children's books; Academic teacher
- Organizations: Fachhochschule Düsseldorf; University of Wuppertal; Folkwang University of the Arts
- Awards: Deutscher Jugendliteraturpreis; Hans Christian Andersen Medal; Astrid Lindgren Memorial Award

Wolf Erlbruch (30 June 1948 – 11 December 2022) was a German illustrator and writer of children's books, who became professor at several universities. He combined various techniques for the artwork in his books, including cutting and pasting, drawing, and painting. His style was sometimes surrealist and is widely copied inside and outside Germany. Some of his storybooks have challenging themes such as death and the meaning of life. They won many awards, including the Deutscher Jugendliteraturpreis in 1993 and 2003. Erlbruch received the Hans Christian Andersen Medal in 2006 for his "lasting contribution" as a children's illustrator. In 2017, he was the first German to win the Astrid Lindgren Memorial Award.

== Life ==
Erlbruch was born in Wuppertal on 30 June 1948. His father was a textile technician. As a child, the boy preferred drawing to playing. Erlbruch studied graphic design at the Folkwang Hochschule in Essen from 1967 to 1974. As a student he worked in advertising, and also worked as an illustrator for magazines such as Stern and Esquire. His first assignment as an illustrator of children's books came in 1985, when he was asked by the Wuppertal publisher Peter Hammer to illustrate Der Adler, der nicht fliegen wollte by James Aggrey; Erlbruch's son Leonard had just been born, and Erlbruch wanted him to be able to say, "Look, my papa made a children's book." From then on, he both illustrated and wrote many books.

Erlbruch taught as a professor of illustration at the Fachhochschule Düsseldorf from 1990 to 1997, then from 1997 as a professor in the department of architecture, design and art of the University of Wuppertal, and from 2009 to 2011 as a professor of illustration at the Folkwang University of the Arts.

== Death ==
Erlbruch died in Wuppertal on 11 December 2022 at age 74.

== Style ==
Erlbruch tackled many adult topics in children's books, though he was not always fond of being characterized as an author for children. Some of his books have autobiographical notes, such as Leonard (a "delightfully eccentric tale"), a book partly inspired by his then six-year-old son Leonard (now an illustrator himself). Many of the characters in his books, such as the mole in The Story of the Little Mole Who Went in Search of Whodunit (also known in English as The Story of the Little Mole Who Knew It Was None of His Business), have little round black glasses, similar to those worn by Erlbruch himself. He was praised for the original and surreal quality of his work. According to Silke Schnettler, writing in the German newspaper Die Welt, the "Erlbruch-style", whose main characters are skewed and sometimes disproportionate but nonetheless recognizable, has become widely imitated inside and outside Germany.

Death is a recurring topic in Erlbruch's books. Duck, Death and the Tulip (2008) features a duck who becomes friends with Death, and in Ein Himmel für den kleinen Bären (A heaven for the little bear) a bear cub tries to find his recently deceased grandfather in bear heaven.

The moral of his own stories, as Schnettler in 2003 reported Erlbruch saying, is that "people should look at themselves from a distance and tolerate what is unique, strange, and sometimes not so pretty about themselves – in other words their peculiarities. This is what Erlbruch considers to be self-awareness."

=== Illustrations ===
Many of Erlbruch's illustrations were made using mixed media and collage. For The Story of the Little Mole, for instance, he drew the characters on brown wrapping paper, and pasted them on white paper.

== Critical reception ==
The Guardian called Duck, Death and the Tulip (2009), about a duck who finds herself being followed by and then becoming acquainted with death, an "outstanding book": "There is something infinitely tender in the way Death strokes her ruffled feathers into place, lifts her body and places it gently in the river, watching as she drifts off into the distance."

Erlbruch's illustrations for Die fürchterlichen Fünf (translated into English as The Fearsome Five) were adapted for the stage by the Landestheater Tübingen, a theatre in Baden-Württemberg, Germany.

== Awards and legacy ==
In 2003, Erlbruch received the Gutenberg Award of the City of Leipzig for his contribution to the book arts, a cultural award of his native city Wuppertal, and a special Deutscher Jugendliteraturpreis for his body of work as illustrator. The biennial Hans Christian Andersen Award conferred by the International Board on Books for Young People is the highest recognition available to a writer or illustrator of children's books. Erlbuch received the illustration award in 2006 for his "lasting contribution" as a children's illustrator. In 2017, he became the first German to win the Astrid Lindgren Memorial Award.

- Deutscher Jugendliteraturpreis for picture book 1993, Das Bärenwunder
- Zilveren Griffel 1998, Mrs. Meyer the Bird
- Zilveren Griffel 1999, Leonard
- Troisdorfer Bilderbuchpreis 2000, Das Neue ABC-Buch
- Bologna Ragazzi Award 2000, Das Neue ABC-Buch
- Gutenberg Prize of the City of Leipzig, 2003
- Deutscher Jugendliteraturpreis 2003, special award for illustrations
- von der Heydt Award, Wuppertal, 2003
- Bologna Ragazzi Award 2004, The Big Question
- Astrid Lindgren Memorial Award, 2017

In 2004, the Erlbruch family started the Wolf Erlbruch Foundation. Its purpose is to act as a custodian for Erlbruch's work, and the money awarded for the Astrid Lindgren Memorial Award goes toward that purpose.

== Works ==
Erlbruch's works include:

=== As writer ===
- Erlbruch, Wolf (1991). Leonard. Wuppertal: Peter Hammer Verlag. ISBN 9783872944672.
- Erlbruch, Wolf (1992). Das Bärenwunder. Wuppertal: Peter Hammer Verlag. ISBN 9783872944931.
- Erlbruch, Wolf (1997). Mrs. Meyer the Bird. Orchard. ISBN 978-0-531-30017-6.
- Erlbruch, Wolf (1999). 's Nachts. Wuppertal: Peter Hammer Verlag. ISBN 978-3-87294-834-2. Translated into Dutch for the 1999 Kinderboekenweek, Norwegian.
- Moritz, Karl Philipp; Wolf Erlbruch (2001). Das Neue ABC-Buch. Kunstmann. ISBN 9783888973321.
- Erlbruch, Wolf (2005). The Big Question. Europa. ISBN 978-1-933372-03-7.
- Erlbruch, Wolf (2006). The Miracle of the Bears. Michael Reynolds (trans.). Europa. ISBN 978-1-933372-21-1.
- Erlbruch, Wolf (2008). Duck, Death and the Tulip. Gecko Press. ISBN 978-1-877467-17-2.
- Erlbruch, Wolf (2009). The Fearsome Five. Gecko Press. ISBN 9781877467233.
- Erlbruch, Wolf (2015). The King and the Sea. Gecko Press. ISBN 9781927271803.

=== As illustrator ===
- Aggrey, James (1985). Der Adler der nicht fliegen wollte, translated by Alfons Michael Dauer. Jugenddienst-Verlag, Wuppertal, ISBN 3-7795-7390-3.
- Dayre, Valérie (1996). Die Menschenfresserin. Peter Hammer Verlag.
- Belli, Gioconda (2006). The Butterfly Workshop. Europa. ISBN 978-1-933372-12-9.
- Chidgey, Catherine (2009). The Fearsome Five. Gecko. ISBN 978-1-877467-23-3.
- Holzwarth, Werner (2001). The Story of the Little Mole Who Went in Search of Whodunit. Chrysalis. ISBN 978-1-85602-440-2.
- Verroen, Dolf (2003). Ein Himmel für den kleinen Bären. Hanser. ISBN 978-3-446-20294-8. Translated into Dutch.
- Hopkins, Lee Bennett (2005). Oh, No! Where Are My Pants? and Other Disasters: Poems. HarperCollins. ISBN 978-0-688-17860-4.
- Moeyaert, Bart (2003). De Schepping. Querido. ISBN 90-451-0045-2. Translated into German, French, Korean, Portuguese, Polish, Spanish, Italian
- Moeyaert, Bart (2010). Het Paradijs. Querido. ISBN 9789045111124. Translated into Spanish
- Moeyaert, Bart (2006). Olek schoot een beer. Querido. ISBN 90-451-0330-3. Translated into German, French, Korean, Spanish
- Lavie, Oren (2014). Der Bär, der nicht da war. Kunstmann. ISBN 978-38-889-7970-5.
