= Jonathan Emmett =

British children's author and pop-up book designer

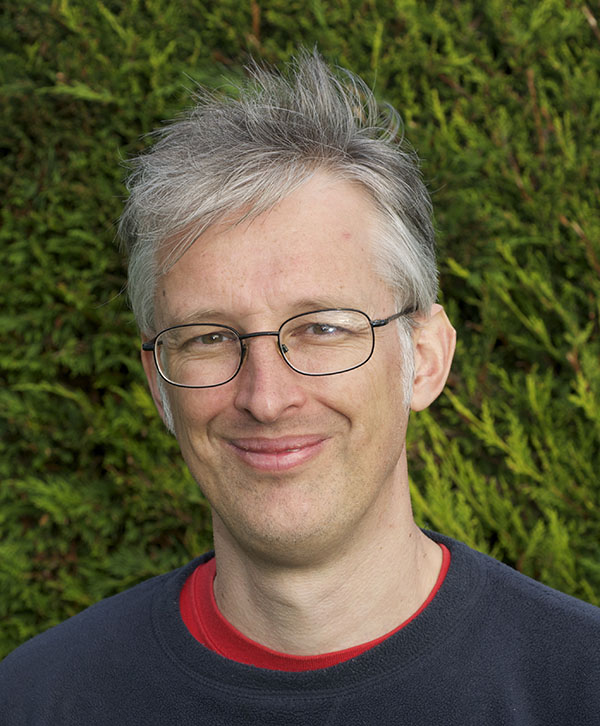
- Born: 10 December 1965 (age 60); Leicester, England
- Education: University of Nottingham
- Occupations: author, pop-up designer
- Known for: Bringing Down the Moon, Someone Bigger and The Princess and the Pig
- Website: jonathanemmett.com

Jonathan Emmett (born 10 December 1965) is a British children's author and pop-up book designer. He is best known for his picture books including Bringing Down the Moon, Someone Bigger and The Princess and the Pig. His books have won several awards including the Red House Children's Book Award for Pigs Might Fly and The Week Junior Book Awards 2024, Children’s Book of the Year: Animals and Nature for The Tyrannosaurs's Feathers.

Emmett has also written and paper-engineered several novelty books including, Alphabet Street and One Cat, Two Cats.

== Life ==
Jonathan Emmett was born in Leicestershire in 1965. Best known as a picture book author, his writing is inspired and influenced by the picture books he read as a child including Where the Wild Things Are by Maurice Sendak and The Cat in the Hat by Dr. Seuss. Emmett developed his writing and illustration skills while at the University of Nottingham studying architecture. He began writing and illustrating children's books in his spare time while working as an architect, but left the profession to pursue a career in children's literature. He has since written over seventy children's books and his work has been translated into 40 different languages.

He lives in Nottingham, England.

== Publications ==
Books by Jonathan Emmett
Title	Illustrator	Original Publisher	Year
Doohickey and the Robot	Stephen Lewis	Oxford University Press	1999
Goblin Stew	Colin Paine	Bloomsbury Books	2000
Serpent Soup	Colin Paine	Bloomsbury Books	2000
Ghostly Goulash	Colin Paine	Bloomsbury Books	2000
Fairy Cake	Colin Paine	Bloomsbury Books	2000
Ten Little Monsters	Ant Parker	Kingfisher	2000
Fox's New Coat	Penny Ives	Puffin Books	2000
Dinosaurs After Dark	Curtis Jobling	HarperCollins	2001
Bringing Down the Moon	Vanessa Cabban︎	Walker Books	2001
Cosmo for Captain	Peter Rutherford︎	Oxford University Press	2002
A Mouse inside the Marmalade	Caroline Jayne Church	Hodder Books	2002
A Turtle in the Toilet	Caroline Jayne Church	Hodder Books	2002
Terry Takes Off	Peter Rutherford︎	Oxford University Press	2003
Through the Heart of the Jungle	Elena Gomez	Hodder Books	2003
Someone Bigger	Adrian Reynolds︎	Oxford University Press	2003
Ruby Flew Too! / Once Upon a Time, Upon a Nest	Rebecca Harry︎	Macmillan Publishers	2004
What Friends Do Best	Nathan Reed︎	HarperCollins	2004
Creature Colours	Jonathan Emmett	Gullane	2004
Robots		HarperCollins	2005
No Place Like Home	Vanessa Cabban︎	Walker Books	2005
Pigs Might Fly	Steve Cox	Puffin Books	2005
Safari Shapes	Jonathan Emmett	Gullane	2005
ZOOM!	Christyan Fox︎	Macmillan Publishers	2005
This Way Ruby!	Rebecca Harry︎	Macmillan Publishers	2005
Rabbits Day Off	Thomas Taylor︎	Gullane	2006
Captain Comet and the Purple Planet	Andy Parker	Oxford University Press	2006
If We Had a Sailboat	Adrian Reynolds︎	Oxford University Press	2006
She'll Be Coming 'Round the Mountain	Deborah Allwright	Egmont Books	2006
Dig it! Build it!	Christyan Fox︎	Macmillan Publishers	2006
Diamond in the Snow	Vanessa Cabban︎	Walker Books	2006
I Love You Always and Forever	Daniel Howarth︎	Gullane	2007
Captain Comet and the Dog Star	Andy Parker	Oxford University Press	2007
Tom's Clockwork Dragon	Mark Oliver︎	Oxford University Press	2008
The Best Gift of All	Vanessa Cabban︎	Walker Books	2008
Emergency Rescue	Christyan Fox︎	Macmillan Publishers	2008
Go For It, Ruby!	Rebecca Harry︎	Macmillan Publishers	2009
Leaf Trouble	Church Caroline Jayne	Chicken House	2009
The Santa Trap	Poly Bernatene︎	Macmillan Publishers	2009
Bones	Alan Baker and Steve Lumb	HarperCollins	2010
MONSTERS – An Owner's Guide	Mark Oliver	Macmillan Publishers	2010
Pirate Pussycat	Ed Eaves	Simon & Schuster	2010
The Pig's Knickers	Vanessa Cabban︎	Walker Books	2010
Foxes in the Snow	Rebecca Harry︎	Macmillan Publishers	2010
The Treasure of Captain Claw	Steve Cox	Orchard Books	2011
ALIENS – An Owner's Guide	Mark Oliver	Macmillan Publishers	2011
The Princess and the Pig	Poly Bernatene︎	Macmillan Publishers	2011
A Secret Worth Sharing	Vanessa Cabban︎	Walker Books	2011
Tyrannosaurus Rocks!	Ed Eaves	Simon & Schuster	2011
Wanda Wallaby Finds Her Bounce	Mark Chambers	Bloomsbury Books	2012
Callum's Incredible Construction Kit	Ben Mantle︎	Egmont Books	2012
Here Be Monsters	Poly Bernatene︎	Macmillan Publishers	2013
Skyboy and other Stupendous Science Stories	Simon Bartram, Kevin Hopgood, Alex Patterson and Yannick Robert	Oxford University Press	2014
Danny Dreadnought Saves the World	Martin Chatterton	Egmont Books	2015
A Spot of Bother	Vanessa Cabban︎	Walker Books	2015
The Clockwork Dragon	Elys Dolan	Oxford University Press	2015
Fast and Furry Racers: The Silver Serpent Cup	Ed Eaves	Oxford University Press	2015
The Emperor's New Clones	Martin Chatterton	Egmont Books	2015
Town Underground		Cambridge University Press	2016
Clever Computers		Cambridge University Press	2016
Prince Ribbit	Poly Bernatene︎	Macmillan Publishers	2016
Scoop's Ups and Downs	Alex Paterson	Oxford University Press	2017
How the Borks Became	Elys Dolan	Otter-Barry Books	2018
Cleopatra Bones and the Golden Chimpanzee	Ed Eaves	Oxford University Press	2018
Alphabet Street	Ingela P. Arrhenius	Nosy Crow	2018
A Present for Rosy	Poly Noakes	Walker Books	2020
The Plesiosaur's Neck (with Dr Adam S. Smith)	Adam Larkum	UCLan Publishing	2021
Christmas Street	Ingela P. Arrhenius	Nosy Crow	2021
The Book Family Robinson	Sam Caldwell	Templar Books	2022
The Tyrannosaur's Feathers (with Dr Adam S. Smith)	Stieven Van der Poorten	UCLan Publishing	2023
Number Train	Ingela P. Arrhenius	Nosy Crow	2024
Monster Makeovers	Rae Minos	Boxer Books	2025
One Cat, Two Cats	Rob Hodgson	Nosy Crow	2025
Spooky Street	Ingela P. Arrhenius	Nosy Crow	2026
Great Dinosaur Mistakes (with Dr Adam S. Smith)	Stieven Van der Poorten	Fox & Ink	2026
One Dog, Two Dogs	Rob Hodgson	Nosy Crow	2026
