= F. E. Higgins =

Irish children's author

- Born: Fiona Higgins; Wicklow, Ireland
- Occupation: Writer
- Writing career
- Language: English
- Period: 2007–present
- Genre: Children's fantasy
- Notable works: The Bone Magician; The Black Book of Secrets

Fiona "F. E." Higgins is an Irish children's author. She is known for her books The Bone Magician and The Black Book of Secrets, the latter of which was awarded a Bisto Honour Award in 2008. Born in Wicklow, she worked as a schoolteacher before becoming a full-time writer in 2000.

== Bibliography ==
=== Tales from the Sinister City ===
1. The Black Book of Secrets (2007)
2. The Bone Magician (2008)
3. The Eyeball Collector (2009)
4. The Lunatic's Curse (2010)

=== The Phenomenals ===
1. A Tangle of Traitors (2013)
2. A Game of Ghouls (2013)

=== Other ===
1. The Perfect Enemy (part of the series Heroes of different authors)
2. New book coming 2020
