= Sam Angus (writer) =

English writer

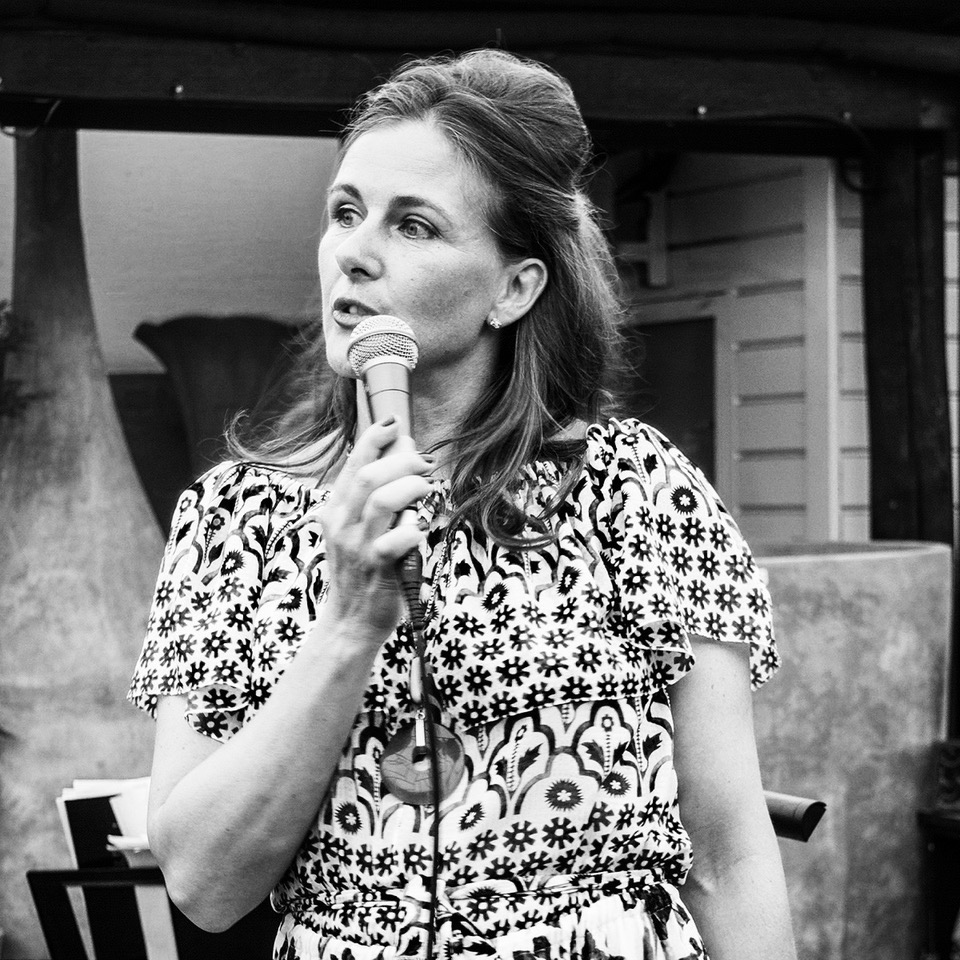
- Angus at the house of hummingbird island launch party
- Born: 21 July 1967 (age 59); England
- Education: Trinity College, Cambridge
- Occupation: Writer
- Writing career
- Language: English
- Subject: Historical adventure novels for children
- Website: www.samangus.com

Samantha Angus (born 21 July 1967) is an English writer of historical adventure novels for children. She is the author of five books, including Soldier Dog, Captain, A Horse Called Hero, and The House on Hummingbird Island. Her novels deal with bleak moments of British and colonial history.

== Soldier Dog ==
Sam's first novel, Soldier Dog, tells the story of a lonely and bullied underage recruit and the Messenger Dog Service in the First World War. The story of Stanley Ryder's dog is based on the true story of Airedale Jack. Soldier Dog won the North East Book Award in 2012 and was long-listed for the CILIP Carnegie Medal award.

Macmillan Publishers secured the world rights to the book in 2012. In 2017, New Sparta Films acquired film rights to Soldier Dog, with Angus collaborating on the adaptation and screenplay.

== Other works ==
Captain, another WWI novel, tells the story of a young refugee from Central Europe who is recruited to the Mule Corps and serves in the war with his donkey Hey-Ho in Gallipoli and the Middle East. The book was nominated in 2015 for the CILIP Carnegie Medal in 2015.

A Horse Called Hero tells the story of two child evacuees from London during World War II who gradually come to understand that their father, a World War I hero, has been imprisoned for cowardice. The story is set in the British countryside of the West Country where Sam lives. It explores the unconditional love between children and animals. The novel won multiple awards including Ealing Readers Award in 2014, and Hillingdon Primary Book of the Year in 2015.

The House on Hummingbird Island, longlisted for the CILIP Carnegie Award and shortlisted for the Cheshire Schools' Book Award, is a coming-of-age story set against the backdrop of the First World War, touching on issues of race, as well as the contribution of the West Indies to the war and their treatment at the hands of the British. As young Idie Grace sheds the skin of her childhood, she confronts the complex truths of her genetic inheritance.

School for Skylarks tells the story of a schoolgirl evacuee from London, who during WWII, is sent to live with an eccentric great-aunt in an equally eccentric stately home. When their home is requisitioned as a school, Lyla's lonely world is turned inside out.

== Personal life ==
Angus attended Trinity College, Cambridge. She has five children, 11 horses, and a small white West Highland terrier.
