= Tony Ross =

British writer of children's books

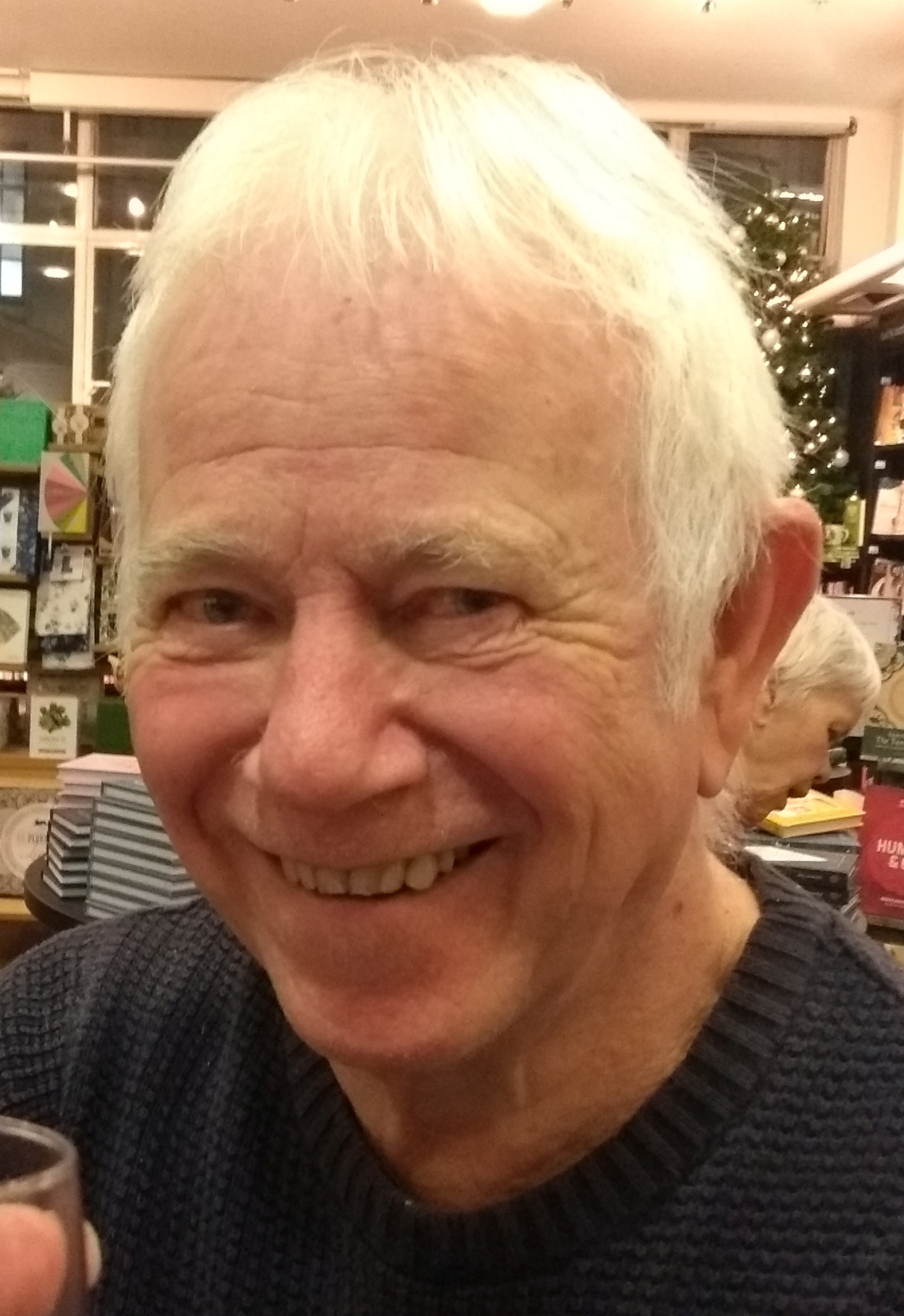
- Ross in 2017
- Born: Anthony Lee Ross; 10 August 1938 (age 88); London, England
- Occupations: Author, illustrator
- Writing career
- Genre: Children's picture books
- Notable awards: Deutscher Jugendliteraturpreis; 1986

Anthony Lee Ross (born 10 August 1938) is a British author and illustrator of children's picture books. In Britain, he is best known for writing and illustrating his Little Princess books and for illustrating the Horrid Henry series by Francesca Simon, both of which have become TV series for Milkshake! and CITV respectively based on his artwork. He also illustrates the works of David Walliams. He has also illustrated the Amber Brown series by Paula Danziger, the Dr. Xargle series by Jeanne Willis, and the Harry The Poisonous Centipede series by Lynne Reid Banks.

== Early life ==
Ross was born on 10 August 1938 in London. His parents are Eric Turle Lee Ross and Effie Ross (née Griffiths). He attended Helsby Grammar School and studied at the Liverpool School of Art and Design.

== Career ==
Ross has had many jobs, including a cartoonist, graphic designer, then art director at an advertising agency. In 1976, his long association with the fledgling Andersen Press began with the publication of his re-telling of Goldilocks and the Three Bears. For several years he was senior lecturer in art and head of the illustration course at Manchester Polytechnic.

Among WorldCat participating libraries, the eight most widely held works by Ross are Amber Brown books written by Danziger. The most widely held book written and illustrated by Ross is I Want Two Birthdays (2008), which is represented in ten languages.

== Awards ==
In 1986 Ross won the Deutscher Jugendliteraturpreis, picture books category, for Ich komm dich holen!, the German-language edition of I'm coming to get you! (Andersen, 1984). For the third Dr. Xargle book with Willis, Dr. Xargle's book of Earth Tiggers, about cats, he was a highly commended runner-up for the 1990 Kate Greenaway Medal from the Library Association, recognising the year's best children's book by a British subject. (Note: Today there are usually eight books on the Greenaway shortlist. According to CCSU, some runners up were Commended (from 1959) or Highly Commended (from 1974). The high distinction was approximately annual from 1979, including Ross alone for 1990. There were 99 distinctions of both kinds in 44 years including six for 1986, three 1990.)

For his contribution as a children's illustrator he was UK nominee for the biennial, international Hans Christian Andersen Award in 2004.
