= Andersen Press =

British book publishing company

- Founded: 1976; 49 years ago
- Founder: Klaus Flugge
- Country of origin: United Kingdom
- Headquarters location: London
- Distribution: The Book Service (UK); Lerner Publishing Group (USA)
- Publication types: Books
- Official website: www.andersenpress.com

Andersen Press is a British book publishing company. It was founded in 1976 by Klaus Flugge, and was named after Hans Christian Andersen "because it is easier to pronounce and spell than Flugge". Random House has a holding in the company and a strong association with Andersen.

The first book on the list was Goldilocks and the Three Bears by the then newly discovered Tony Ross, who wrote the popular children's series Little Princess. The Andersen list now consists of more than 1000 published titles, the majority of which are still in print.

Andersen Press specialises in picture books and children's fiction, and the authors it publishes include Melvin Burgess, Max Velthuijs, Ralph Steadman, Quentin Blake, Jeanne Willis and Emma Chichester Clark. Perhaps the most well-known character on the list is Elmer the Patchwork Elephant, created by David McKee.

== See also ==
- UK children's book publishers
