= Nestlé Smarties Book Prize =

British annual award

The Nestlé Children's Book Prize, and Nestlé Smarties Book Prize for a time, was a set of annual awards for British children's books that ran from 1985 to 2007. It was administered by BookTrust, an independent charity that promotes books and reading in the United Kingdom, and sponsored by Nestlé, the manufacturer of Smarties chocolate. It was one of the most respected and prestigious prizes for children's literature.

There were three award categories defined by audience ages 0 to 5 years, 6 to 8 years, and 9 to 11 years (introduced in 1987 after two years with no single prize). Silver and bronze runners-up in each category were introduced in 1996 and designation of one overall winner was abandoned at the same time.

Eligible books were written by UK citizens and residents and published during the preceding year (not precisely the calendar year). The shortlists were selected by a panel of adult judges, finally chaired by Julia Eccleshare, children's books editor for The Guardian. First, second, and third places were determined by British schoolchildren—at least finally, by vote of "selected school classes"

The prize was discontinued in 2008 by what was described as a "mutual" decision from BookTrust and Nestlé, with "no hostility". Explaining their reasons for this decision, BookTrust stated it had "been reviewing the organisation's priorities and how prizes and awards fit in with its strategic objectives", while Nestlé was "increasingly moving its community support towards the company strategy of nutrition, health and wellness." Additionally, they said that it was a "natural time to conclude" and that they were "confident that increased importance has been placed on children's books."

== Winners ==
There were 65 winning books in 23 years and 72 silver or bronze runners-up in the last twelve years.

=== 1980s ===
Prize winners, 1985-1989
| Year | Category | Author | Title | Publisher | Ref. |
|---|---|---|---|---|---|
| 1985 | Overall | Jill Paton Walsh | Gaffer Samson's Luck | Kestrel | |
| 1986 | Overall | Jenny Nimmo | The Snow Spider | Methuen | |
| 1987 | Overall | James Berry | A Thief in the Village | Hamish Hamilton | |
| 1987 | 9–11 years | James Berry | A Thief in the Village | Hamish Hamilton | |
| 1987 | 6–8 years | Benedict Blathwayt | Tangle and the Firesticks | Julia MacRae | |
| 1987 | 0–5 years | Peter Collington | The Angel and the Soldier Boy | Methuen | |
| 1988 | Overall | Martin Waddell, illus. by Barbara Firth | Can't You Sleep Little Bear? | Walker Books | |
| 1988 | 6–8 years | Susan Hill | Can it be True? | Hamish Hamilton | |
| 1988 | 0–5 years | Martin Waddell, illus. by Barbara Firth | Can't You Sleep Little Bear? | Walker Books | |
| 1989 | Overall | Michael Rosen, illus. by Helen Oxenbury | We're Going on a Bear Hunt | Walker Books | |
| 1989 | 9–11 years | Robert Westall | Blitzcat | Macmillan | |
| 1989 | 6–8 years | Anne Fine, illus. by Philippe Dupasquier | Bill's New Frock | Methuen | |
| 1989 | 0–5 years | Michael Rosen, illus. by Helen Oxenbury | We're Going on a Bear Hunt | Walker Books | |

=== 1990s ===
Beginning in 1996, the awards included silver and bronze winners rather than a single overall winner.

Prize winners, 1985-1989
| Year | Category | Author | Title | Publisher | Result | Ref. |
|---|---|---|---|---|---|---|
| 1990 | Overall | Pauline Fisk | Midnight Blue | Lion | Winner | |
| 1990 | 0–5 years | Inga Moore | Six-Dinner Sid | Simon & Schuster | Winner | |
| 1990 | 6–8 years | Roald Dahl, illus. by Quentin Blake | Esio Trot | Jonathan Cape | Winner | |
| 1990 | 9–11 years | Pauline Fisk | Midnight Blue | Lion | Winner | |
| 1991 | Overall | Martin Waddell and Helen Oxenbury | Farmer Duck | Walker Books | Winner | |
| 1991 | 0–5 years | Martin Waddell and Helen Oxenbury | Farmer Duck | Walker Books | Winner | |
| 1991 | 6–8 years | Magdalen Nabb | Josie Smith and Eileen | Collins | Winner | |
| 1991 | 9–11 years | Philip Ridley | Krindlekrax | Jonathan Cape | Winner | |
| 1992 | Overall | Gillian Cross | The Great Elephant Chase | Oxford University Press | Winner | |
| 1992 | 0–5 years | Hilda Offen | Nice Work, Little Wolf | Hamish Hamilton | Winner | |
| 1992 | 6–8 years | Jane Ray | The Story of the Creation | Orchard Books | Winner | |
| 1992 | 9–11 years | Gillian Cross | The Great Elephant Chase | Oxford University Press | Winner | |
| 1993 | Overall | Michael Foreman | War Game | Pavilion | Winner | |
| 1993 | 0–5 years | Rita Phillips Mitchell | Hue Boy | Gollancz | Winner | |
| 1993 | 6–8 years | Michael Foreman | War Game | Pavilion | Winner | |
| 1993 | 9–11 years | Maeve Henry | Listen to the Dark | Heinemann | Winner | |
| 1994 | Overall | Hilary McKay | The Exiles at Home | Gollancz | Winner | |
| 1994 | 0–5 years | Trish Cooke, illus. by Helen Oxenbury | So Much | Walker Books | Winner | |
| 1994 | 6–8 years | Henrietta Branford, illus. by Lesley Harker | Dimanche Diller | Young Lions | Winner | |
| 1994 | 9–11 years | Hilary McKay | The Exiles at Home | Gollancz | Winner | |
| 1995 | Overall | Jacqueline Wilson | Double Act | Doubleday | Winner | |
| 1995 | 0–5 years | Jill Murphy | The Last Noo-Noo | Walker Books | Winner | |
| 1995 | 6–8 years | Jill Paton Walsh | Thomas and the Tinners | Macdonald Young Books | Winner | |
| 1995 | 9–11 years | Lesley Howarth | Weather Eye | Penguin | Winner | |
| 1995 | 9–11 years | Jacqueline Wilson | Double Act | Doubleday | Winner | |
| 1996 | 0–5 years | Colin McNaughton | Oops! | Andersen Press | Gold | |
| 1996 | 0–5 years | Mick Manning and Brita Granström | The World is Full of Babies | Watts Books | Silver | |
| 1996 | 0–5 years | Quentin Blake | Clown | Jonathan Cape | Bronze | |
| 1996 | 6–8 years | Michael Morpurgo, illus. by Christian Birmingham | The Butterfly Lion | Collins Children's Books | Gold | |
| 1996 | 6–8 years | Lynne Reid Banks, illus. by Tony Ross | Harry the Poisonous Centipede | Collins Children's Books | Silver | |
| 1996 | 6–8 years | Dick King-Smith, illus. by John Eastwood | All Because of Jackson | Doubleday | Bronze | |
| 1996 | 9–11 years | Philip Pullman, illus. by Nick Harris | The Firework-Maker's Daughter | Corgi Yearling | Gold | |
| 1996 | 9–11 years | Terry Pratchett | Johnny and the Bomb | Doubleday | Silver | |
| 1996 | 9–11 years | Geraldine McCaughrean | Plundering Paradise | Oxford University Press | Bronze | |
| 1997 | 0–5 years | Charlotte Voake | Ginger | Walker Books | Gold | |
| 1997 | 0–5 years | Simon James | Leon and Bob | Walker Books | Silver | |
| 1997 | 0–5 years | Valerie Bloom, illus. by David Axtell | Fruits | Macmillan | Bronze | |
| 1997 | 6–8 years | Jenny Nimmo, illus. by Anthony Lewis | The Owl Tree | Walker Books | Gold | |
| 1997 | 6–8 years | Michael Foreman | The Little Reindeer | Andersen Press | Silver | |
| 1997 | 6–8 years | John Agard, illus. by Satoshi Kitamura | We Animals Would Like a Word With You | Bodley Head | Bronze | |
| 1997 | 9–11 years | J. K. Rowling | Harry Potter and the Philosopher's Stone | Bloomsbury Publishing | Gold | |
| 1997 | 9–11 years | Philip Pullman | Clockwork or All Wound Up | Corgi Yearling | Silver | |
| 1997 | 9–11 years | Henrietta Branford | Fire, Bed, and Bone | Walker Books | Bronze | |
| 1998 | 0–5 years | Sue Heap | Cowboy Baby | Walker Books | Gold | |
| 1998 | 0–5 years | Jane Simmons | Come On Daisy | Orchard Books | Silver | |
| 1998 | 0–5 years | Margaret Nash | Secret in the Mist | David & Charles | Bronze | |
| 1998 | 6–8 years | Harry Horse | Last of the Gold Diggers | Puffin Books | Gold | |
| 1998 | 6–8 years | Keith Gray | The Runner | Mammoth Books | Silver | |
| 1998 | 6–8 years | Quentin Blake | The Green Ship | Jonathan Cape | Bronze | |
| 1998 | 9–11 years | J. K. Rowling | Harry Potter and the Chamber of Secrets | Bloomsbury Publishing | Gold | |
| 1998 | 9–11 years | Andrew Norriss | Aquila | Puffin Books | Silver | |
| 1998 | 9–11 years | Dick King-Smith | The Crowstarver | Doubleday | Bronze | |
| 1999 | 0–5 years | Julia Donaldson, illus. by Axel Scheffler | The Gruffalo | Macmillan | Gold | |
| 1999 | 0–5 years | Bob Graham | Buffy - An Adventure Story | Walker Books | Silver | |
| 1999 | 0–5 years | Lydia Monks | I Wish I Were a Dog | Methuen | Bronze | |
| 1999 | 6–8 years | Laurence Anholt, illus. by Arthur Robins | Snow White and the Seven Aliens | Orchard Books | Gold | |
| 1999 | 6–8 years | Emily Smith, illus. by Tim Archbold | Astrid, the Au Pair from Outer Space | Corgi | Silver | |
| 1999 | 6–8 years | Lauren Child | Clarice Bean That's Me | Orchard Books | Bronze | |
| 1999 | 9–11 years | J. K. Rowling | Harry Potter and the Prisoner of Azkaban | Bloomsbury Publishing | Gold | |
| 1999 | 9–11 years | David Almond | Kit's Wilderness | Hodder Children's Books | Silver | |
| 1999 | 9–11 years | Louise Rennison | Angus, Thongs and Full-Frontal Snogging | Piccadilly Press | Bronze | |

=== 2000s ===
Prize winners, 2000-2007
| Year | Category | Author | Title | Publisher | Result | Ref. |
|---|---|---|---|---|---|---|
| 2000 | 0–5 years | Bob Graham | Max | Walker Books | Gold | |
| 2000 | 0–5 years | Satoshi Kitamura | Me and My Cat? | Andersen | Silver | |
| 2000 | 0–5 years | John Burningham | Husherbye | Jonathan Cape | Bronze | |
| 2000 | 6–8 years | Jacqueline Wilson, illus. Nick Sharratt | Lizzie Zipmouth | Young Corgi | Gold | |
| 2000 | 6–8 years | Tony Mitton, illus. Peter Bailey | The Red and White Spotted Handkerchief | Scholastic | Silver | |
| 2000 | 6–8 years | Lauren Child | Beware of the Storybook Wolves | Hodder | Bronze | |
| 2000 | 9–11 years | William Nicholson | The Wind Singer | Mammoth | Gold | |
| 2000 | 9–11 years | Beverley Naidoo | The Other Side of Truth | Puffin | Silver | |
| 2000 | 9–11 years | Kevin Crossley-Holland | The Seeing Stone | Orion | Bronze | |
| 2000 | Kids' Club Network Special Award | Jacqueline Wilson, illus. Nick Sharratt | Lizzie Zipmouth | Young Corgi | Gold | |
| 2001 | 0–5 years | Catherine Anholt and Laurence Anholt | Chimp and Zee | Frances Lincoln | Gold | |
| 2001 | 0–5 years | Mick Inkpen | Kipper's A to Z | Hodder | Silver | |
| 2001 | 0–5 years | Sarah Dyer | Five Little Friends | Bloomsbury Publishing | Bronze | |
| 2001 | 6–8 years | Emily Smith, illus. Wendy Smith | The Shrimp | Young Corgi | Gold | |
| 2001 | 6–8 years | Raymond Briggs | Ug | Jonathan Cape | Silver | |
| 2001 | 6–8 years | Lauren Child | What Planet Are You From Clarice Bean? | Orchard Books | Bronze | |
| 2001 | 9–11 years | Eva Ibbotson | Journey to the River Sea | MacMillan | Gold | |
| 2001 | 9–11 years | Chris Wooding | The Haunting of Alaizabel Cray | Scholastic | Silver | |
| 2001 | 9–11 years | Geraldine McCaughrean | The Kite Rider | Oxford University Press | Bronze | |
| 2001 | Kids' Club Network Special Award | Lauren Child | What Planet Are You From Clarice Bean? | Orchard Books | Gold | |
| 2002 | 0–5 years | Lucy Cousins | Jazzy in the Jungle | Walker Books | Gold | |
| 2002 | 0–5 years | Charlotte Voake | Pizza Kittens | Walker Books | Silver | |
| 2002 | 0–5 years | Neal Layton | Oscar and Arabella | Hodder | Bronze | |
| 2002 | 6–8 years | Lauren Child | That Pesky Rat | Orchard Books | Gold | |
| 2002 | 6–8 years | Richard Platt, illus. Chris Riddell | Pirate Diary | Walker Books | Silver | |
| 2002 | 6–8 years | Michael Morpurgo, illus. Michael Foreman | The Last Wolf | Doubleday | Bronze | |
| 2002 | 9–11 years | Philip Reeve | Mortal Engines | Scholastic | Gold | |
| 2002 | 9–11 years | Sally Prue | Cold Tom | Oxford University Press | Silver | |
| 2002 | 9–11 years | Geraldine McCaughrean | Stop the Train! | Oxford University Press | Bronze | |
| 2002 | Kids' Club Network Special Award | Lauren Child | That Pesky Rat | Orchard Books | Gold | |
| 2003 | 0–5 years | Ursula Jones, illus. Russell Ayto | The Witch's Children and the Queen | | Gold | |
| 2003 | 0–5 years | Jeanne Willis, illus. Tony Ross | Tadpole's Promise | | Silver | |
| 2003 | 0–5 years | Chris Wormell | Two Frogs | | Bronze | |
| 2003 | 6–8 years | S. F. Said, illus. Dave McKean | Varjak Paw | | Gold | |
| 2003 | 6–8 years | Harry Horse | The Last Castaways | | Silver | |
| 2003 | 6–8 years | Sally Gardner | The Countess's Calamity | | Bronze | |
| 2003 | 9–11 years | David Almond | The Fire-Eaters | | Gold | |
| 2003 | 9–11 years | Eleanor Updale | Montmorency Series | | Silver | |
| 2003 | 9–11 years | Steve Augarde | The Various | | Bronze | |
| 2003 | Kids' Club Award | Sally Gardner | The Countess's Calamity | | Gold | |
| 2004 | 0–5 years | Mini Grey | Biscuit Bear | Jonathan Cape | Gold | |
| 2004 | 0–5 years | Liz Pichon | My Big Brother Boris | Scholastic | Silver | |
| 2004 | 0–5 years | Neal Layton | Bartholomew and the Bug | Hodder | Bronze | |
| 2004 | 6–8 years | Paul Stewart, illus. by Chris Riddell | Fergus Crane | Doubleday | Gold | |
| 2004 | 6–8 years | Malorie Blackman | Cloud Busting | Doubleday | Silver | |
| 2004 | 6–8 years | Geraldine McCaughrean | Smile! | Oxford University Press | Bronze | |
| 2004 | 9–11 years | Sally Grindley | Spilled Water | Bloomsbury Publishing | Gold | |
| 2004 | 9–11 years | Eva Ibbotson | The Star of Kazan | MacMillan | Silver | |
| 2004 | 9–11 years | Mal Peet | Keeper | Walker Books | Bronze | |
| 2004 | 4Children Special Award (Note: The Children Special Award winners were selected by after school clubs.) | Paul Stewart, illus. by Chris Riddell | Fergus Crane | Doubleday | Gold | |
| 2005 | 0–5 years | Oliver Jeffers | Lost and Found | HarperCollins | Gold | |
| 2005 | 0–5 years | Malachy Doyle, illus. Steve Johnson and Lou Fancher | The Dancing Tiger | Simon & Schuster | Silver | |
| 2005 | 0–5 years | Emily Gravett | Wolves | MacMillan | Bronze | |
| 2005 | 6–8 years | Nick Butterworth | The Whisperer | HarperCollins | Gold | |
| 2005 | 6–8 years | Michael Rosen, illus. Quentin Blake | Sad Book | Walker Books | Silver | |
| 2005 | 6–8 years | Paul Stewart and Chris Riddell | Corby Flood | Doubleday | Bronze | |
| 2005 | 9–11 years | Sally Gardner | I, Coriander | Orion | Gold | |
| 2005 | 9–11 years | Philip Pullman | The Scarecrow and his Servant | Doubleday | Silver | |
| 2005 | 9–11 years | Livi Michael | The Whispering Road | Puffin | Bronze | |
| 2006 | 0–5 years | Cressida Cowell and Neal Layton | That Rabbit Belongs to Emily Brown | Orchard Books | Gold | |
| 2006 | 0–5 years | Chris Riddell | The Emperor of Absurdia | MacMillan | Silver | |
| 2006 | 0–5 years | Mick Inkpen | Wibbly Pig's Silly Big Bear | Hodder | Bronze | |
| 2006 | 6–8 years | Daren King | Mouse Noses on Toast | Faber and Faber | Gold | |
| 2006 | 6–8 years | Paul Stewart and Chris Riddell | Hugo Pepper | Doubleday | Silver | |
| 2006 | 6–8 years | Mini Grey | The Adventures of the Dish and the Spoon | Jonathan Cape | Bronze | |
| 2006 | 9–11 years | Julia Golding | The Diamond of Drury Lane | Egmont Press | Gold | |
| 2006 | 9–11 years | Helen Dunmore | The Tide Knot | HarperCollins | Silver | |
| 2006 | 9–11 years | Paul Shipton | The Pig Who Saved the World | Puffin | Bronze | |
| 2007 | 0–5 years | Sean Taylor and Nick Sharratt | When a Monster is Born | Orchard Books | Gold | |
| 2007 | 0–5 years | Polly Dunbar | Penguin | Walker Books | Silver | |
| 2007 | 0–5 years | Joel Stewart | Dexter Bexley and the Big Blue Beastie | Doubleday | Bronze | |
| 2007 | 6–8 years | Chris Riddell | Ottoline and the Yellow Cat | Macmillan Children's Books | Gold | |
| 2007 | 6–8 years | Anne Fine | Ivan the Terrible | Egmont Press | Silver | |
| 2007 | 6–8 years | Emily Gravett | Little Mouse's Big Book of Fears | Macmillan Children's Books | Bronze | |
| 2007 | 9–11 years | Matt Haig | Shadow Forest | Bodley Head | Gold | |
| 2007 | 9–11 years | Linda Newbery | Catcall | Orion | Silver | |
| 2007 | 9–11 years | Philip Reeve | Here Lies Arthur | Scholastic | Bronze | |

== See also ==
- Carnegie Medal
- Children's Book Council of Australia Awards
- Dorothy Canfield Fisher Children's Book Award
- Gelett Burgess Children's Book Award
- Guardian Children's Fiction Prize
- Kate Greenaway Medal
- Newbery Medal
