= Little Mouse's Big Book of Fears =

2007 children's book by Emily Gravett

- First edition, 2007
- Author: Emily Gravett
- Illustrator: Emily Gravett
- Cover artist: Emily Gravett
- Language: English
- Genre: Children's picture book
- Publisher: Macmillan
- Publication date: 3 August 2007
- Publication place: United Kingdom
- Pages: 32 pp
- ISBN: 978-1-4050-8948-7
- OCLC: 228503432
- LC Class: PZ7.G77577 Em 2008

Little Mouse's Big Book of Fears is a 2007 children's picture book written and illustrated by Emily Gravett, published by Macmillan. It won the annual Kate Greenaway Medal from the professional librarians as the year's best-illustrated children's book published in the U.K. It was also bronze runner up for the Nestlé Smarties Book Prize in ages category 6–8 years.

It is represented as an activity book (intended for the user to document their own fears and how they overcame them) that has been filled in and illustrated by "Little Mouse". The front cover illustration shows the title Little Mouse's ~~Emily Gravett's~~ Big Book of Fears and a hole chewed by a mouse. The book was published in the U.S. by Simon & Schuster in 2008. At least in the U.S., the title page also gives that form and notes, "Previously published in 2007 under title: Emily Gravett's big book of fears." That is in the tradition of her first Greenaway Medal-winner Wolves (Macmillan, 2005), about a rabbit, which was published in the U.S. as "Wolves by Emily Grrrabbit".

In the book are sketches and collages of some of the many things Little Mouse is afraid of, including creepy crawlies, sharp knives, and being eaten. The correct scientific name for each of these fears is given in the corner of the page.
