= The Last Wolf =

2002 children's book by Michael Morpurgo

- First edition
- Author: Michael Morpurgo
- Illustrator: Michael Foreman
- Language: English
- Genre: Children's
- Publisher: Doubleday
- Publication date: 1 January 2002
- Publication place: United Kingdom
- Pages: 96 pp
- ISBN: 978-0-385-60222-8
- OCLC: 59478600

The Last Wolf is a 2002 children's book written by Michael Morpurgo and illustrated by Michael Foreman. It won the Nestlé Smarties Book Prize Bronze Award.

== Plot ==
Miya helps her grandfather, Michael McLeod, become interested in computers. Michael comes up with the idea to trace their ancestors back to the 18th century; while working to do that, they discover a story written by their great-great-great-great-great grandfather.

In the story, their great-great-great-great-great grandfather, Robbie McLeod, talks about his childhood. After being orphaned, his cruel uncle had looked after him; to escape the abuse, Robbie ran away into the woods. He found a male wolf pup who, similarly, had also been orphaned, and looked after him, naming it Charlie. A few days later, Robbie and Charlie made their way to America in hopes of a better life, but they were disillusioned; in America, there had been a war between the redcoats and the rebels. They encountered life-threatening situations.

As the years passed, Charlie's temperament naturally became wilder and more animalistic. Robbie noticed the change in Charlie and, reluctantly, let him go. He built a farm next to a lake where he occasionally saw Charlie. A couple years later, Robbie got married and had a son named Alan. The last time Robbie saw Charlie, Charlie had also started a family of his own.

After reading the story, Miya and her grandfather decide to travel to America to see where Robbie and Charlie lived.
