= War Game (novel) =

1993 children's novel by Michael Foreman

- Front cover of unknown edition
- Author: Michael Foreman
- Illustrator: Michael Foreman
- Cover artist: Michael Foreman
- Language: English
- Genre: Children's war novel
- Publisher: Pavilion Books
- Publication date: 7 October 1993; 33 years ago
- Publication place: United Kingdom
- Media type: Print (hardback and paperback)
- Pages: 76 pp (first edition)
- ISBN: 1-85793-069-X
- OCLC: 36675730
- LC Class: PZ7.F75829 War 1993

War Game is a children's novel about World War I written and illustrated by Michael Foreman and published by Pavilion in 1993. It features four young English soldiers and includes football with German soldiers during the Christmas truce, "temporary relief from the brutal and seemingly endless struggle in the trenches".

War Game won the 1993 Nestlé Children's Book Prize in ages category 6–8 years and overall. Foreman was a commended runner up for the annual Greenaway Medal from the Library Association, recognising the best children's book illustration by a British subject. (Note: At least from 1995 the Greenaway Medal shortlist typically comprises eight books. According to CCSU, some runners up through 2002 were Commended (from 1959) or Highly Commended (from 1974). There were 99 commendations of both kinds in 44 years, including Foreman commended and Helen Oxenbury highly commended in 1993.)

== Summary ==
Will, Freddie, Billy, and Lacey are our young friends eager for "the grand adventure" of old-fashioned war. The story follows them through training in England, arrival in France and the trenches, the famous 1914 Christmas truce, and the Battle of the Somme. At key points in the story, the author includes historical information on particular events of the war.

The main characters are named after and based on Foreman's uncles who were killed in the war at ages 18 to 24. He was born about twenty years later in 1938.

== Adaptations ==
In 2002, the book was adapted as a short animated film by the same name by the British animation company Illuminated Films.

In 2014, War Game was adapted for theatre by Toby Hulse as a one-man show, which was performed by actor Robin Cummings at the Bristol Old Vic for a 12-day run in November of that year. The production received positive critical reviews.
