= Owl Babies =

1992 book by Martin Waddell

- Author: Martin Waddell
- Illustrator: Patrick Benson
- Language: English
- Genre: Children's literature, picture book
- Published: 1992 (Walker Books)
- Publication place: England
- Media type: Print (hardback)
- Pages: 32 (unpaginated)
- ISBN: 9780744521665
- OCLC: 808489790

Owl Babies is a 1992 book by Martin Waddell and illustrated by Patrick Benson. It is about three owlets who wake up one night to find their mother gone. The trio worry about her absence, but are then elated when she returns from her night flight.

== Reception ==
The Horn Book Magazine, in a review of the board book edition of Owl Babies, wrote "too much text on each spread, destroying the pace of the original and demanding too much of the board-book audience." and School Library Journal wrote "This simple story pales in comparison to the exceptionally well-crafted illustrations. .. The repetition just doesn't work. The plot is too meager, the text too unexciting. .. Simple, well-written books about mother love and reassurance for this age group are abundant.", while Booklist, suggested "This story will strike a familiar chord in every small child who has been afraid when left by his or her parent, and parents will perhaps gain a new understanding of how a small child might feel when he or she is left." and concluded "A wonderful "read to me" book for nap time, story time, or bedtime."

Booktrust called it "reassuring and stunningly illustrated" and The Guardian described it as "the best owl family" in a children's book.

Owl Babies has also been reviewed by Publishers Weekly, Kirkus Reviews, Books for Keeps, and Early Childhood Ireland.
