= The Shrimp =

Children's novel by Emily Smith

- First edition cover
- Author: Emily Smith
- Publisher: Young Corgi
- Publication date: January 1, 2001
- ISBN: 978-0-552-54735-2

The Shrimp is a children's novel by Emily Smith. It won the 2001 Gold Award in 6–8 years category of the Nestlé Smarties Book Prize.

== Characters ==
- Ben Shrimpton: Ben is a shy boy who likes to collect shells. Because of his height and shyness, his friends like to call him "Shrimp".
- Colin: Colin is a spoiled boy in a rich family who likes to boast about how rich his family is. He doesn't like Ben and was the first person who started calling Ben "Shrimp".
