= The Whispering Road =

2005 children's book by Livi Michael

- Author: Livi Michael
- Language: English
- Genre: Children's
- Publisher: Puffin
- Publication date: 6 January 2005
- Publication place: United Kingdom
- Pages: 416 pp
- ISBN: 978-0-14-131703-8
- OCLC: 56873802

The Whispering Road is a 2005 children's book by Livi Michael. It won the Nestlé Children's Book Prize Bronze Award and the Stockton Children's Book of the Year Award, as well as being shortlisted for the Ottakar's Children's Book Prize.

== Plot summary ==
The Whispering Road documents the stories of Joe, a young, orphaned boy who loves to tell fantastical stories, and Annie, his younger sister who can contact the dead. Since their mother left them on the front step of the local workhouse, Joe and Annie have been searching for her, but to no success. At the beginning of the novel, they work for a cruel master and mistress, whose chores they complete. An abusive old man named Old Bert supervises them constantly and punishes them for the least mistake. Old Bert forces Joe and Annie to sleep in the chicken coop, and threatens to kill Joe if they wake him up. After Annie becomes cold, Joe, angered at the people of the farm, makes the decision to run away; he tries to catch one of the chickens. Joe's perturbed efforts wake up most of the chickens, attracting Old Bert, who Joe hits over the head with a shovel. Young Bert sends the farm owner's hounds upon the siblings, who make for the nearby fence separating the estate from the woods. It is assumed that they escape and fall asleep somewhere in the woods, thus, when they wake up, they are greeted by a hobbit-like man who seems warm and kind. He names himself as Travis, and tells them many stories about his adventures in the woods, such as meeting Dog-woman, an outcast angel. Joe and Annie travel far and wide searching for their mother. Soon they meet other outcasts in a traveling circus. Joe sells Annie and sets off for Manchester, where he meets a street gang. He becomes a member and stays with them for a while. They taught him about Manchester and he taught them how to use a sling. Suddenly, an epidemic spread through the gang. A member, called Lookout, becomes sick and soon dies.
