= Sue Heap =

British children's book illustrator (born 1954)

Sue Heap (born 1954) is a British children's book illustrator. She has illustrated over thirty books, some of which she also wrote – including Cowboy Baby, winner of the Smarties Prize Gold Award in 1998. She is also noted for her creative collaborations; with Nick Sharratt, Sally Lloyd-Jones and, most recently, Teresa Heapy. Several of her picture books have been nominated for the Greenaway Medal, and her collaboration with Sally Lloyd-Jones for Schwartz & Wade Books, 'How To Be A Baby... By Me, the Big Sister' was a New York Times bestseller and Notable Book in 2007.

== Early life ==
Heap was born in 1954 in Hampshire, England. As a child she lived in places as diverse as Singapore, Germany and Egypt. She wrote and drew to reflect her rootless lifestyle, creating her first picture book at the age of twelve. Later she earned a degree from Hull College of Art. She worked for an animation company and then as a designer at children's book publishers in Oxford and London, before settling in Oxfordshire as a full-time author and illustrator.

== Works ==
In addition to her picture books, Heap is known for her illustrations in Jacqueline Wilson's books, such as How to Survive Summer Camp (ISBN 978-0192727046) and Double Act (ISBN 978-0440413745), co-illustrating the latter with Nick Sharratt.

== Awards and nominations ==
Winner of the Smarties Prize Gold Award (later styled the Nestlé Children's Book Prize) for 'Cowboy Baby' in 1998. Nominated for the Greenaway Medal for her collaboration with Sharratt, 'Red Rockets and Rainbow Jelly'; and for 'Very Little Red Riding Hood', by Teresa Heapy and Sue Heap.

'How To Be A Baby... By Me, the Big Sister' by Sally Lloyd-Jones and Sue Heap was one of six children's books selected as a New York Times Notable Book in 2007.

Shortlisted for the Jerwood Drawing Prize in 2008.

'Very Little Red Riding Hood' by Teresa Heapy and Sue Heap was The Times Children's Book of the Week in November 2013.

'Very Little Red Riding Hood' by Teresa Heapy and Sue Heap was winner in 2015 of Best Picture Book in the Oxfordshire Children’s Book Award and the Coventry Inspiration Book Awards.
