= Emily Smith (author) =

British children's writer

Emily Smith is an English children's writer. Her books are aimed at young readers, mainly writing for Young Corgi Books (a Transworld Publishers imprint) and Orchard Books. Her first children's book, Astrid, the au pair from Outer Space won the silver medal in the 6-8 age group, at the Nestlé Smarties Book Prize 1999. The Shrimp won the 6-8 age group Nestlé Smarties Book Prize Gold medal in 2000.

== Awards ==
- Gold award in the 6–8 age group of the 2001 Smarties Awards for The Shrimp.
- Silver prize in the 6–8 age group of the 1999 Smarties Awards for Astrid, the au pair from Outer Space.

== Publications ==
- The Good Manners Prize (HarperCollins Educational, 1996)

Stories contributed to original anthologies:

- "The Friendship Necklace", Incredibly Creepy Stories, ed. Tony Bradman (Corgi, Oct 1997), pp. 45–62
- "Across Three Millennia", Sensational Cyber Stories, ed. Tony Bradman (Doubleday UK, Nov 1997), pp. 81–96

Published by Young Corgi Books, a Transworld Publishers imprint, for children ages about 6 to 10 years:

- Astrid, the au pair from Outer Space (1999)
- The Shrimp (2001)
- Annie and the Aliens (2002); hardcover published by Andersen Press, 2001
- Robomum (2003)
- Patrick the Party-Hater (2004)
- Joe v. The Fairies (2005)

Published by Orchard Books, for children ages about 9 years and up:

- What Howls at the Moon in Frilly Knickers? (2001)
- When Mum Threw Out the Telly (2003)
- A Stain on the Stone (2006)
