= The Odd Egg =

Book by Emily Gravett

First edition (publ. Macmillan)

The Odd Egg is a children's picture book written and illustrated by British illustrator Emily Gravett.

== Plot ==
An odd duck finds an old egg. He is jealous of mother birds having eggs. So he adopts the big egg that has green spots that matches his feathers. The other birds make fun of him about it. When each egg breaks open, only the odd duck's egg remains. The egg hatches later and it is an alligator. The alligator acts like a duck.

== Reception ==
- Amanda Craig, of The Times reviewed the book saying, "With her exquisitely expressive style of drawing animals, this was bound to be a winner. Children will feel for her poor Duck as he (not she) sits patiently, ignoring the sneers, waiting for an enormous green-spotted egg to hatch into an enormous and sinister surprise".
- A Publishers Weekly review says, "There is mild ambiguity—not everyone is shown getting out of its way and feathers do fly—yet the gator seems amiable. A parting view shows it waddling after skinny Duck, saying “Mama,” wearing a scarf Duck has knitted and booties that resemble a duck's webbed feet. A witty salute to both nature and nurture".
- A review from NATE Classroom says, "Aimed at an older early reader than Orange Pear Apple Bear but much simpler than Meerkat Mail, this book is perfect for sharing with children aged 3+. I would highly recommend this hardback version because this is simply a beautiful picture book that you can feel proud to own for a very long time at any age".
