= How to Survive Summer Camp =

1985 novel by Jacqueline Wilson

- First edition
- Author: Jacqueline Wilson
- Illustrator: Sue Heap
- Language: English
- Genre: Children's novel
- Publisher: OUP (first edition, hardback)
- Publication date: 1985
- Publication place: United Kingdom
- Pages: 224
- ISBN: 978-0-19-272704-6

How to Survive Summer Camp is a children's novel written by Jacqueline Wilson and illustrated by Sue Heap. It was first published in 1985. It features a ten-year-old girl named Stella who is forced to go to summer camp.

== Characters ==
- Stella Stebbings (Baldy) – The protagonist of the novel, she is forced to go to Evergreen Summer Camp while her parents are away for their honeymoon. She is adventurous and a rulebreaker, but she also has a caring and creative personality.
- Marzipan – One of Stella's Emerald room-mates and perhaps Stella's best friend; she is a kindhearted yet timid bookworm girl described as being "a bit large and lumpy"
- Louise – one of Stella's Emerald room-mates. She is snobbish, excels at sports and is very pretty, with long blonde hair, and she has rich parents and designer clothes.
- Karen – Louise's best friend. She is not as pretty as Louise and calls Stella names, like Baldy.
- Alan – One of the Emerald boys, who excels at swimming and enjoys comics. Becomes one of Stella's good friends at Evergreen.
- Rosemary – one of Stella's Emerald room-mates. Begins as a very shy five-year-old who refuses to speak, but when Stella rescues her toy donkey from the cowpat, she finds her voice and becomes good friends with her.
- Janie – one of Stella's Emerald room-mates, she is Rosemary's best friend, and is from Croydon (her family background is from the Seychelles). She is good friends with Stella, too.
- James – one of the Emerald boys; a large boy who speaks in rhyme.
- Bilbo – one of the Emerald boys. Around Rosemary's age and quite irritating.
- Richard – the oldest Emerald boy who appears to have a crush on Louise.
- Brigadier – the owner of Evergreen who resides in the tower room of the house. Initially Stella is terrified of him but after their first meeting and his magazine suggestion and eventual success in teaching her how to swim, Stella warms to him.
- Miss Hamer-Cotton – the Brigadier's bossy daughter and in charge of most activities at Evergreen. She is most likely to be in her twenties or thirties, although she acts like an older and stricter woman.
- Uncle Ron – the activities organiser, Alan and Stella nicknamed him 'Uncle Pong' due to his smelly tracksuit.
- Jimbo – in charge of judo at Evergreen.
- Jilly – in charge of macrame at Evergreen.
- Mrs Markham (Orange Overall/Purple Pinafore/Dotty Dress/Nylon Nightie) – a member of staff who is furtively caring for a baby fox on the premises until he is free to be put back in the wild.

== Translations ==
- Greek: Πώς να επιβιώσεις στην κατασκήνωση, romanized: Pós na epivióseis stin kataskínosi. Translated by Maria Grammenou. Athens: Psichogios. 24 May 2012. ISBN 9789604965458.
