= Tom Gates =

Series of books

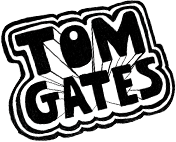
Tom Gates title art

Tom Gates is a British series of fiction and graphic books written by Liz Pichon taking the form of an illustrated diary written by the eponymous schoolboy. There are a total of 23 published Tom Gates books, as of 2025. The first book in the series, The Brilliant World of Tom Gates, was published in 2011 and won the Roald Dahl Funny Prize, a Red House Children's Book Award and a Waterstones Children's Book Prize. As of 2023, the books have sold more than 14 million copies worldwide and have been translated into 47 languages.

== Background ==
Aged around 10 years old, Tom is the younger of the two children of Frank and Rita Gates, and the younger brother of Delia. He attends Oakfield Primary School where he is in Mr Fullerman's Class 5F, under headmaster Mr Keen. Children in his class include Marcus Meldrew (who sits next to and consistently annoys Tom in class), and Amy Porter (who also sits next to Tom, but whom Tom hopes to impress). Also in his year at Oakfield is his best friend Derek Fingle, who also lives next door to him. Tom has a second neighbour, June Jones, that annoys Tom and dislikes his band but they later become friends.

His grandparents are Frank's parents, Granny Mavis and Granddad Bob, that Tom refers to as "The Fossils", while Rita's parents are known as "The Wrinklies".

Tom and Derek are in a band called Dogzombies, consisting of Tom on guitar, Derek on keyboard, and classmate Norman Watson on drums.

== Books ==
- The Brilliant World of Tom Gates (2011)
- Tom Gates: Excellent Excuses (and Other Good Stuff) (2011)
- Tom Gates: Everything's Amazing (Sort Of) (2012)
- Tom Gates: Genius Ideas (Mostly) (2012)
- Tom Gates Is Absolutely Fantastic (at Some Things) (2013)
- Tom Gates: Extra Special Treats (Not) (2013)
- Tom Gates: A Tiny Bit Lucky (2014)
- Tom Gates: Yes! No (Maybe...) (2015)
- Tom Gates: Top of the Class (Nearly) (2015)
- Tom Gates: Super Good Skills (Almost...) (2016)
- Tom Gates: DogZombies Rule (for Now) (2016)
- Tom Gates: Family, Friends and Furry Creatures (2017)
- Tom Gates: Epic Adventure (Kind Of) (2017)
- Tom Gates: Biscuits, Bands and Very Big Plans (2018)
- Tom Gates: What Monster? (2018)
- Tom Gates: Mega Make and Do (and Stories Too!) (2019)
- Tom Gates: Spectacular School Trip (Really!) (2019)
- Tom Gates: Ten Tremendous Tales (2021)
- Tom Gates: Random Acts of Fun (2021)
- Tom Gates: Happy to Help (Eventually) (2022)
- Tom Gates: Five Star Stories (Hooray!) (2023)
- Tom Gates: Book of Everything (2024)
- Tom Gates Is Ha! Ha! Hilarious! (2024)
- Tom Gates: Pesky Pets and Parties (2025)

=== Additional books ===
- Tom Gates: Best Book Day Ever! (So Far) (2013)
- Tom Gates: Totally Brilliant Annual (2014)
- Tom Gates: The Music Book (2020)
- Tom Gates: Big Book of Fun Stuff (2020)
- You Can Draw Tom Gates with Liz Pichon (2022)
- Tom Gates: Totally Brilliant Advent Calendar (2022)

== Adaptations ==
=== Stage ===
In 2019, the Birmingham Stage Company presented a stage play called Tom Gates Live on Stage! that featured the characters in live action. It toured the UK and starred Matthew Chase as Tom Gates and Amy Hargreaves as Delia.

=== Television ===
In 2020, Sky Kids announced that it was making The Brilliant World of Tom Gates to be available on Sky's on-demand service Sky Kids in the UK and Ireland. The first series, consisting of 20 animated episodes, was released in early 2021, featuring Catherine Tate as both Rita Gates and Granny Mavis, Mark Bonnar as Mr Fullerman, and Logan Matthews as Tom Gates. Creator Liz Pichon also appears in the episodes in a live-action segment in which she gives ideas for creating artwork inspired by the series. The second series was released in 2022, followed by the third in 2023. The series also has the Halloween and Christmas specials.

== Awards ==
Year	Book	Award	Category	Result
2011	The Brilliant World of Tom Gates	Roald Dahl Funny Prize	—	Won
2012	The Brilliant World of Tom Gates	Red House Children's Book Award	Younger Readers	Won
2012	The Brilliant World of Tom Gates	Waterstones Children's Book Prize	Fiction 5-12	Won
2012	Genius Ideas (Mostly)	Specsavers National Book Awards	Children's Book of the Year	Runner-up
2013	Genius Ideas (Mostly)	Blue Peter Book Award	Story	Won
