= Fruits (book) =

Children's book by Valerie Bloom

- Author: Valerie Bloom
- Illustrator: David Axtell
- Publisher: Henry Holt & Co.
- Publication date: March 1, 1997
- Award: Nestlé Smarties Book Prize (1997)
- ISBN: 0-8050-5171-6

Fruits: A Caribbean Counting Poem (ISBN 0805051716) is a children's picture book written by Valerie Bloom and illustrated by David Axtell. In 1997 it won the Nestlé Smarties Book Prize Bronze Award.

== Reception ==
The BookTrust called Fruits "a sumptuous book, with rich, vibrant and distinctive illustrations." Kirkus Reviews found that "although authentic to the Patwa language, the pronunciations and cadences can, for unpracticed readers, result in a halting tempo rather than the intended rhythmic lilt." Similarly, Publishers Weekly indicated that "readers may need guidance deciphering some of the words". They also thought that "first-time illustrator Axtell['s ...]evocation of the poem's lush tropical setting and brightly painted buildings offers a lively backdrop for Bloom's bouncy poem."
