= My Big Brother, Boris =

2004 children's picture book by Liz Pichon

- Author: Liz Pichon
- Illustrator: Liz Pichon
- Language: English
- Genre: Children's
- Publisher: Scholastic Press
- Publication date: 21 May 2004
- Publication place: United Kingdom
- Pages: 36 pp
- ISBN: 978-0-439-97702-9
- OCLC: 56464335
- Dewey Decimal: 823.914 22
- LC Class: MLCM 2006/43064

My Big Brother, Boris is a 2004 children's picture book by Liz Pichon. It won the Nestlé Smarties Book Prize Silver Award.
