= Sheeep =

- Genre: Animation
- Directed by: Ginger Gibbons
- Voices of: Julia Sawalha; Enn Reitel; David Holt
- Composer: Bob Heatlie
- Country of origin: United Kingdom
- Original language: English
- No. of seasons: 2
- No. of episodes: 26

Production
- Running time: 10 minutes per episode (approx.)
- Production companies: Grand Slamm Children's Films; HIT Entertainment

Original release
- Network: CBBC
- Release: 7 April 2000 – 3 April 2001

Sheeep is a British 2000 animated children's television series based on the book Sheep in Wolves' Clothing by Japanese author Satoshi Kitamura. It was produced by HIT Entertainment for CBBC, with animation production by Grand Slamm Children's Films. The series follows the adventures of three sheep called Georgina, Gogol and Hubert who often end up thwarting the scheme of the wolves or even Moze's companions mess them up.

== Characters ==
- Georgina (voiced by Julia Sawalha) – A female sheep who has a rather bossy, domineering personality. She sometimes appears to be the self elected leader of the trio and is often too keen to put her opinions forward. Also she mistrusts wolves more than anyone. She leads a flock of sheep in (fictional) "Green Meadow".
- Gogol (voiced by Enn Reitel) – He is the intellectual of the trio, and he seems to be the only sheep who spends most of his time in the city. He drives a car, owns a house and has a job as a photographer.
- Hubert (voiced by David Holt) – The quietest and most modest of the flock; he seldom speaks and lives in "Green Meadow" with his sister, Georgina.
- Moze (voiced by Enn Reitel) – The devious planner of bad schemes for the wolves' benefit, who wears a black and red striped necktie as well as sunglasses.
- Spike (voiced by David Holt) – One of Moze's sidekicks. Wears a green bow tie and sunglasses.
- Gotcha (voiced by David Holt) – Moze's other sidekick who wears a blue bandana.
- Kid (vocal effects by Julia Sawalha) – Gotcha's little sister. She says nothing, she just always licks a lollipop and doesn't at all involve herself in the wolves' schemes. Kid wears a green and blue striped skirt and hair bow. In the original book, her position is used by an older male wolf wearing a green waistcoat.
- Mumsie (voiced by Enn Reitel) – Moze's mother.
- Captain Bleat (voiced by David Holt)
- Uncle Elliott (voiced by Enn Reitel)
- P.C. Butt (voiced by David Holt)
- Jaunita Luftfita (voiced by Julia Sawalha)
- Penny (voiced by Julia Sawalha)

== Episodes ==
No.	Title	Written by	Original release date
1	"Say Cheese"	Joe Boyle	7 April 2000
Gogol takes Georgina and Hubert to do some photography, while the wolves try to steal some yellow-berry pie.
2	"Queen Georgina"	Joe Boyle	14 April 2000
Today, at the Green Meadow Festival, Georgina is to attend a traditional coronation, which Moze intends to intercept, but it is cut short when he blunders.
3	"The Stamp"	Joe Boyle and Naomi Cassman	28 April 2000
Georgina and Hubert take care of Uncle Elliot's office, whilst he's away on an assignment with Gogol. Meanwhile, The wolves sneak in to swipe Elliot's valuable stamp collection.
4	"Gogol the Champion"	Paul Fraser	5 May 2000
Gogol goes through Georgina's tiring exercises to prepare for the gate jumping event. The wolves enter Kid in the event with spring-powered shoes.
5	"Hubert's Surprise"	Joe Boyle	12 May 2000
Today is Hubert's birthday and Gogol has prepared a party, but the wolves greedily gorge on the party food.
6	"Gogol's Sofa"	Joe Boyle	19 May 2000
Moze tries to sell Gogol a new sofa with stolen newspapers for the stuffing, but Georgina's Uncle Elliot has followed their trail.
7	"The Flat Tyre"	Joe Boyle	26 May 2000
The wolves have created a hole in the road, causing Gogol's car to have a couple of punctures. Will the wolves get caught by PC Butt?
8	"Gogol Learns Golf"	Jan Page	2 June 2000
Hubert becomes Gogol's caddy, then various golf equipment is stolen by the wolves, but Georgina reveals their theft.
9	"Stuck in the Mud"	Mark Holloway	9 June 2000
Hubert assists Captain Bleat to guard his beach mat cargo. The wolves trap the boat in a muddy bank to get the beach mats, but their plan backfires when the river bed traps them. Meanwhile, Georgina tries to cure Gogol of the hiccups, whilst trying to enjoy her book.
10	"Sheeep Showers"	Paul Fraser	16 June 2000
Georgina, Hubert and Gogol have a game of volleyball on the beach but when Kid plays, it exposes the wolves' handbag stealing.
11	"Tango Tangle"	Andy Bernhardt	14 July 2000
Due to a problem with Jaunita Laufita's resignation, Moze has Spike impersonate her for the grand tango performance, but Georgina and PC Butt soon catch them.
12	"Housesitting"	Hiawyn Oram	21 July 2000
While Gogol is away, Georgina and Hubert take care of his house. However Moze with a visit from his mother tries to occupy the house.
13	"Treasure Treats"	Jan Page	28 July 2000
Georgina, Hubert and Gogol join in a treasure hunt event. The wolves follow them, but are cut off by a deep hole Gotcha dug.
14	"The Big Freeze"	Jan Page	2 January 2001
The wolves make their move to steal some firewood from the sheep, who are preparing dinner, but Captain Bleat and Uncle Elliot catch them.
15	"Stormy Weather"	Andy Bernhardt	9 January 2001
Georgina and Gogol get caught in Moze's concert after Gogol signs a strict contract, but Captain Bleat and Hubert devise a plan to get out of it.
16	"Scoop"	Dave Ingham	16 January 2001
Moze takes over Gogol's newspaper photography job, but their latest attempt for a scoop backfires and forces Gogol to come to the rescue.
17	"Georgina's Sleepover"	Jan Page	23 January 2001
Things don't turn out well for everyone when Georgina has a sleepover with her prissy cousin Penny and Moze tries to get a present for his mother. Meanwhile, Hubert and Gogol play cricket.
18	"Say it with Flowers"	Joe Boyle	30 January 2001
As Georgina, Hubert and Gogol attend Gogol's garden, the wolves try to steal what they think is a valuable plant and Kid helps it grow.
19	"The Bank Robbery"	Jan Page	13 February 2001
Georgina and Hubert and Gogol participate a jumble sale where the wolves get some disguises to rob a bank. Hubert blows their cover and Gogol summons the police.
20	"The Flood"	Joe Boyle	20 February 2001
While Green Meadow holds back the flood waters, Gogol buys many umbrellas. After the wolves fail to steal the umbrellas, Kid puts them to good use.
21	"The Talent Contest"	Dave Ingham	27 February 2001
The town holds a talent contest. Georgina gets the gang ready to perform a musical number, hoping to get close to the host. The wolves plan to steal the trophy using a trap door in the stage.
22	"Keep Fit"	Joe Boyle	6 March 2001
Moze puts some stolen cans of beans to use for a fitness gym, but Georgina, Hubert and Gogol play their own game against them.
23	"Sea Tales"	Jan Page	13 March 2001
Hubert does photography for Gogol who is currently sick, but leaks a story of sunken treasure which greatly interests the wolves.
24	"Georgina and the Princess"	Dave Ingham	20 March 2001
Georgina, Hubert and Gogol ready themselves for Princess Grazelightly's opening of a new supermarket, but Gogol makes Georgina's fleece pink, making her embarrassed, until she meets the guest of honour. Meanwhile, the wolves have trouble with a rope at the top of a tall building.
25	"Snow Business"	Andy Bernhardt	27 March 2001
The wolves create snow drifts to charge fees for snow cleanup. Hubert's giant snowball stops their ruse altogether.
26	"Hubert Goes Green"	Hiawyn Oram	3 April 2001
Hubert finds himself in the wolves' shop after he ends up in a pile of recycled goods.
