= Jazzy in the Jungle =

2002 children's picture book by Lucy Cousins

- Author: Lucy Cousins
- Illustrator: Lucy Cousins
- Language: English
- Genre: Children's
- Publisher: Walker Books
- Publication date: 4 September 2002
- Publication place: United Kingdom
- Pages: 32 pp
- ISBN: 978-0-7445-9250-4
- OCLC: 49906027

Jazzy in the Jungle is a 2002 children's picture book by Lucy Cousins. It won the Nestlé Smarties Book Prize Gold Award.
