= Wibbly Pig's Silly Big Bear =

2006 children's picture book by Mick Inkpen

- Author: Mick Inkpen
- Illustrator: Mick Inkpen
- Language: English
- Genre: Children's
- Publisher: Hodder Children's Books
- Publication date: 20 July 2006
- Publication place: United Kingdom
- Pages: 32 pp
- ISBN: 978-0-340-91718-3
- OCLC: 65467938

Wibbly Pig's Silly Big Bear is a 2006 children's picture book written and illustrated by Mick Inkpen. It won the Nestlé Children's Book Prize Bronze Award.
