= Catcall (novel) =

2006 children's book by Linda Newbery

- Author: Linda Newbery
- Language: English
- Genre: Children's
- Publisher: Orion
- Publication date: 19 October 2006
- Publication place: United Kingdom
- Pages: 179 pgs
- ISBN: 978-1-84255-125-7
- OCLC: 70173774

Catcall is a 2006 children's novel by Linda Newbery. It won the Nestlé Children's Book Prize Silver Award.

== Plot ==
The story focuses on a young boy named Josh, whose family goes through a dramatic upheaval. There is a new stepdad and a new baby sister.

Josh's younger brother Jamie takes this badly and soon develops an obsession with wild cats and a refusal to speak. Josh uses all his skills, and a cat scrapbook, to help his family heal.
