= Barbara Firth =

British illustrator

- Born: 20 September 1928
- Died: 18 February 2013 (aged 84)
- Occupation: Illustrator
- Notable work: Can't You Sleep, Little Bear?
- Awards: Kate Greenaway Medal

Barbara Firth (20 September 1928 – 18 February 2013) was a British illustrator of children's books, best known for her work on Martin Waddell's Little Bear books. She won the 1988 Kate Greenaway Medal.

== Early life ==
Firth was born in Cheshire on 20 September 1928. She enjoyed drawing as a child but had no formal art education. She qualified in pattern cutting at the London College of Fashion.

== Career ==
She worked for 15 years for Vogue as production director on books on crochet, knitting and dressmaking. She moved to Marshall Cavendish and worked on their partworks, and there met Amelia Edwards who commissioned her to illustrate some non-fiction work including Margaret Lane's The Spider. This led to work on David Lloyd's Great Escapes books and subsequently to her work with Waddell.

She won the 1988 Kate Greenaway Medal, awarded by the then Library Association (now CILIP) for "distinguished illustration in a book for children", for her work on Martin Waddell's Can't You Sleep Little Bear? (Walker, ISBN 1844284913), which has been called "as perfect a picture-book as anyone could hope to make". The book was also the overall winner of the 1988 Nestlé Smarties Book Prize.

She illustrated four further Little Bear books by Waddell, and his The Park in the Dark which won the 1989 Kurt Maschler Award.

She also illustrated books by other authors, including Sarah Hayes (The Grumpalump), and books by Charles Causley and Jonathan London.

== Personal life and death ==
Barbara Firth lived much of her life in Harrow, with her sister Betty. She had a household full of pets including Waldo the tortoise, who featured in Lloyd's Waldo the Tortoise, which she illustrated.

She died on 18 February 2013 and was survived by her sister Betty and the centenarian Waldo.
