= Two Frogs =

2003 children's picture book by Chris Wormell

- Author: Chris Wormell
- Illustrator: Chris Wormell
- Language: English
- Genre: Children's
- Publisher: Jonathan Cape
- Publication date: 2 January 2003
- Publication place: United Kingdom
- Pages: 32 pp
- ISBN: 978-0-224-06474-3
- OCLC: 50841140

Two Frogs is a 2003 children's picture book written and illustrated by Chris Wormell. It won the Nestlé Smarties Book Prize Bronze Award and was shortlisted for the Kate Greenaway Medal.
