= Emily Gravett =

English author and illustrator (born 1972)

- Born: 1972 (age 53–54); Brighton, England
- Occupations: Author and illustrator
- Children: 1

Emily Gravett (born 1972) is an English author and illustrator of children's picture books. For her debut book Wolves published in 2005 and Little Mouse's Big Book of Fears published three years later, she won the annual Kate Greenaway Medal recognising the year's best-illustrated British children's book.

== Life ==
Emily Gravett was born in Brighton, England, the second daughter of a printmaker father and an art teacher mother. After her parents separated, she lived with her mother, but she and her father would "go out drawing" in museums. She left school at 16 with a GCSE qualification only in Art (grade A) and travelled Great Britain for eight years, living in "a variety of vehicles" and meeting her partner Mik.

By 1997, they had settled in Wales and had a daughter, Oleander (Olly).

Gravett "realised that I wanted a career, and drawing was my only skill", so she began an art course. The family returned to Brighton in 2001, where persistence rather than qualifications got her an interview for the illustration degree course at the local university. She matriculated that September and graduated three years later.

After bringing up her daughter in Brighton, Emily and her partner moved to rural Wales in 2023.

== Career ==
During her second year as a student, Gravett entered one of her school projects for the Macmillan Prize for Children's Illustration, a competitive annual award to art students established in 1985. She earned a "Highly Commended" then and won the prize in her final year, when she entered two books that the judges ranked first and second. That ensured a contract publication of Wolves by Macmillan Children's Books (now the Children's Books imprint of Pan Macmillan). The editorial director later said, "It was quite obvious who the winner was going to be. Emily entered Wolves in a beautiful dummy format, and really we had to do very little work on it before it was published. She's a bookbinder as well as an artist; a real creator of books." Two years after graduation she won the Kate Greenaway Medal from the Chartered Institute of Library and Information Professionals, recognising Wolves as the previous year's (2005) best-illustrated new children's book published in the United Kingdom. By that time, rights had been sold in five other countries.

Next year (officially dated 2007) (Note: Between the 2005/2006 and 2006/2007 cycles, CILIP changed its method of dating medals and shortlists, so Gravett's three-year run of recognised books is officially dated 2005, 2007, and 2008.) she made the Greenaway shortlist for Orange Pear Apple Bear. The year after that she won a second Medal (no one has won three) for her fourth book, Little Mouse's Big Book of Fears, and made the shortlist as well for fifth book, Monkey and Me. WorldCat reports that Orange Pear Apple Bear is her work most widely held in participating libraries. According to one library summary, it "[e]xplores concepts of color, shape, and food using only five simple words, as a bear juggles and plays."

For 2008 Gravett was official illustrator for World Book Day (United Kingdom) — an honor with duties such as specially commissioned illustrations and recorded demonstration of characters from her books.

The former Children's Laureate (2011–2013) Julia Donaldson wrote and Gravett illustrated Cave Baby, a 32-page picture book featuring a prehistoric baby's tour atop a woolly mammoth, published by Macmillan in 2010. It has been published in Welsh-language and Chinese editions but not in the United States. She is the illustrator of J K Rowling's Quidditch Through the Ages, illustrated edition (2020) published by Bloomsbury Children's Books. Gravett made many physical artefacts, including a broom, silk badges and ceramics that were then photographed for the illustrations

== Style ==
Gravett completed Wolves in six weeks as an illustration course project and added only the back endpaper spread during the editorial process. Some projects take longer but she wrote and sketched Orange Pear Apple Bear in merely 11 hours, waking one Mother's Day with the four words in her head and staying in bed for "the whole book in one go".

Gravett's books are interactive. She encouraged the pet dog to chew the dummy for Wolves "to simulate the impact of the wolf's teeth". That didn't work so she chewed it herself.

She wanted Little Mouse's Big Book of Fears to look genuinely chewed, so she painted yoghurt on plain white paper and laid it in the cage of the two pet rats. They nibbled it and peed on it, which she scanned to produce background for drawing. The front cover illustration shows the title Little Mouse's ~~Emily Gravett's~~ Big Book of Fears, a mouse looking through a hole it has chewed, and damage along the book edges.

Little Mouse is also a movable book, with "lift flaps and a fold-out map" (quoting a review).

== Works ==
=== As author and illustrator ===
- Wolves (Macmillan, 2005, ISBN 1-405-05082-9)

—published as Wolves by "Emily Grrrabbit" in the United States (Simon & Schuster, 2006)

- Orange Pear Apple Bear (2006)
- Meerkat Mail (2006)
- Little Mouse's Big Book of Fears (2007)
- Monkey and Me (2007)
- The Odd Egg (2008)
- Spells (2008)
- Dogs (2009)
- The Rabbit Problem (2009)
- Blue Chameleon (2010)
- Wolf Won't Bite! (2011)
- Again! (2011)
- Matilda's Cat (2 August 2012)
- Little Mouse's Big Book of Beasts (2013)
- Bear and Hare: Go Fishing (2014)
- Bear and Hare: Snow! (2014)
- Bear and Hare: Where's Bear? (2015)
- Bear and Hare: Mine! (2016)
- Tidy (2016)
- Old Hat (2017)
- Cyril and Pat (2018)
- Meerkat Christmas (2019)
- Too Much Stuff (2020)
- 10 Cats (2022)
- 10 Dogs (2023)
- Bothered by Bugs (2024)
- Bear's Nap (2025)

=== As illustrator ===
- Cave Baby (2010), written by Julia Donaldson
- The Imaginary (2014), written by A. F. Harrold
- The Afterwards (2018), written by A. F. Harrold
- Evie and the Animals (2020), written by Matt Haig
- Evie in the Jungle (2020), written by Matt Haig
- A Song of Gladness (2021), written by Michael Morpurgo
- Locked Out Lily (2021), written by Nick Lake
- The House With a Dragon in it (2023), written by Nick Lake
- Island of Whispers (2023), by Frances Hardinge
- The Ogre Who Wasn't (2023), written by Michael Morpurgo
- The Forest of a Thousand Eyes (2024), by Frances Hardinge

== Awards and recognitions ==
Gravett has won annual British book awards three times.

Awards

- Wolves won the 2005 Kate Greenaway Medal.
- Monkey and Me won the 2007 Booktrust Best Emerging Illustrator for children up to five-years-old.
- Little Mouse's Big Book of Fears won the 2008 Kate Greenaway Medal.
- Tidy won the 2017 Indie Book Awards for Picture Book category.

Runners-up, etc.

- 2005, Wolves was bronze runner-up for the Smarties Prize, ages 0–5 years.
- 2006, Orange Pear Apple Bear made the shortlist for the Booktrust Early Years Pre-School Award.
- 2007, Orange Pear Apple Bear made the Greenaway shortlist.
- 2007, Little Mouse's Big Book of Fears was bronze runner-up for the Smarties Prize, ages 6–8 years.
- 2007, Wolves made the shortlist for the Hampshire Illustrated Book Award.
- 2008, Monkey and Me made the Greenaway shortlist.
- 2012, Wolf Won't Bite! made the Greenaway shortlist.
- 2013, Matilda's Cat made the Indie Book Awards shortlist.
- 2022, Too Much Stuff made the Greenaway shortlist.
