= Matilda's Cat =

Children's picture book by Emily Gravett

- Author: Emily Gravett
- Language: English
- Genre: Children's picture book
- Published: 2012 (Macmillan Children's Books)
- Publication place: England
- Media type: Print (hardback)
- Pages: 32 (unpaginated)
- ISBN: 9780230745377
- OCLC: 800852809

Matilda's Cat is a 2012 children's picture book by Emily Gravett. The book is about Matilda, a girl dressed in a ginger-striped cat costume, who attempts to involve her similarly ginger-striped cat in various activities to no avail but then eventually snuggles up with the cat in bed.

== Publication history ==
- 2014, USA, Simon & Schuster Books for Young Readers ISBN 9781442475274
- 2012, England, Macmillan Children's Books ISBN 9780230745377

== Reception ==
A review in Kirkus Reviews of Matilda's Cat wrote "A master of animal countenance, Gravett pairs an expressive cat with a busy kid and winks at the difference between textual and visual message", and Booktrust wrote that "Gravett’s illustrations in this funny and touching picture book are as delightful as ever."

Matilda's Cat has also been reviewed by Publishers Weekly, Booklist, School Library Journal, Horn Book Guides, Library Media Connection, The Bulletin of the Center for Children's Books, The New York Times, and The Wall Street Journal.

It was long-listed for the 2013 Kate Greenaway Medal.
