= Laurence Anholt =

English author and illustrator

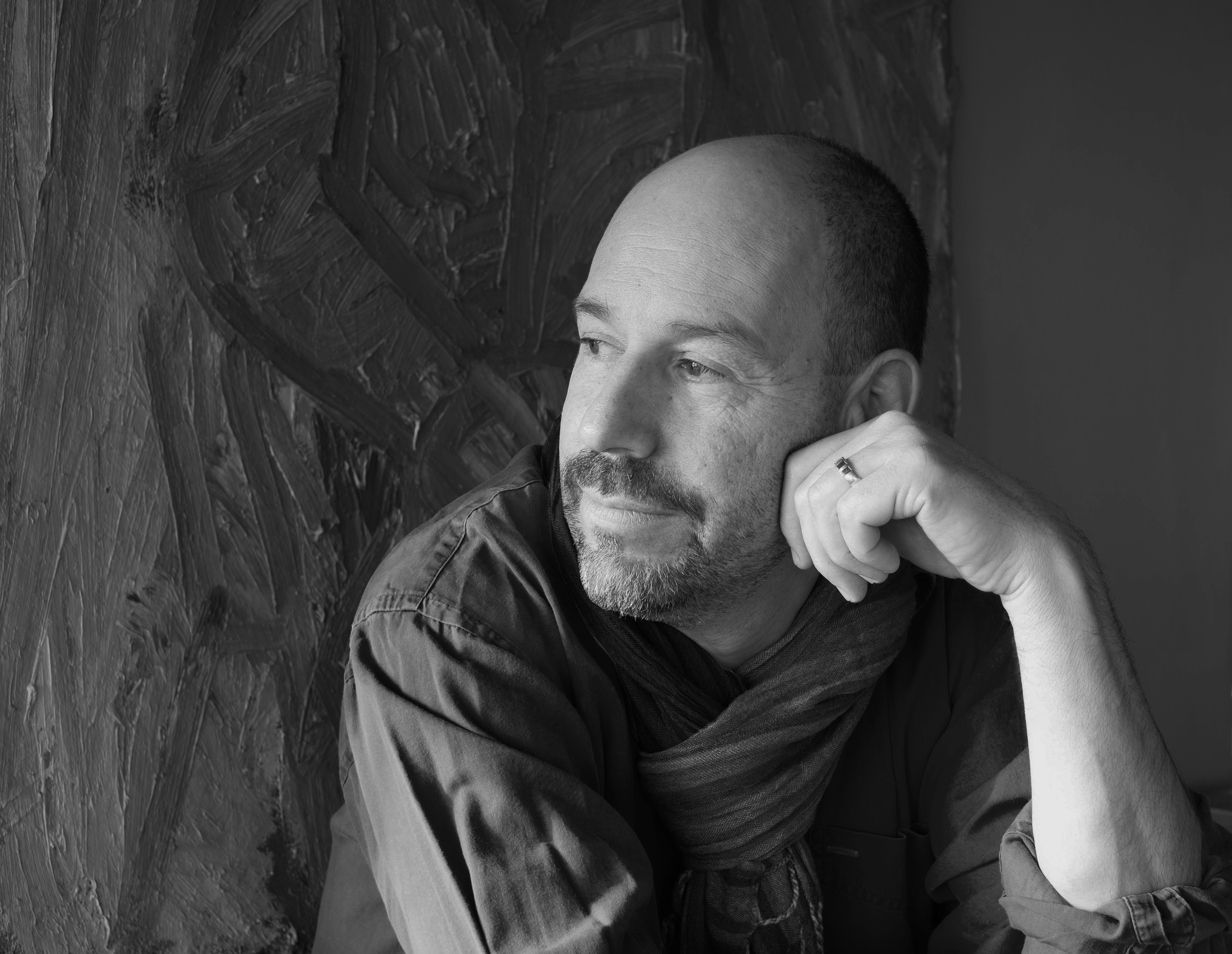
- Born: Laurence Anholt; 4 August 1959 (age 67); Barnet, London
- Education: Box Hill School, Falmouth School of Art (BA Hons Fine Art); Royal Academy of Art (MA Fine Art)
- Occupations: Writer and Illustrator
- Spouse: Catherine Anholt
- Children: 3
- Writing career
- Genre: Children's Fiction Young Adult Fiction Crime Fiction
- Notable works: Chimp and Zee; Seriously Silly Stories series Anholt's Artists series The Hypnotist; The Mindful Detective Series
- Notable awards: Nestlé Smarties Gold Award 2001; Nestlé Smarties Gold Award 1999 Historical Association Young Quills Award 2017
- Website: www.anholt.co.uk

Laurence Anholt (born 4 August 1959) is an English author and illustrator of more than 200 books in over 30 languages, covering a wide age range, from picture books to adult fiction. Anholt's picture books are notable for their upbeat and humorous approach to important issues for young children, often based on his own family experience and typified by a quirky, hand drawn pen and watercolour style. In recent years, Anholt has turned to writing for an older age range, including The Hypnotist a novel for a Young Adult readership published by Penguin Random House, about race and civil rights set in the Deep South of America in the early 1960s. The novel was officially endorsed by Amnesty International and in 2017 won the Historical Association's Young Quills Award. In July 2019, Anholt's first title in the Mindful Detective series featuring Buddhist cop, Vincent Caine, Art of Death was published by Constable / Little, Brown. Laurence Anholt lives in Devon, Southwest England.

== Awards and recognition ==
International awards include the Nestlé Smarties Gold Award 2001 for 'Chimp and Zee', written by Anholt, illustrated by Catherine Anholt, and the Nestlé Smarties Gold Award 1999 for 'Snow White and the Seven Aliens', one of the 'Seriously Silly Stories' written by Anholt, Illustrated by Arthur Robins. Anholt has been amongst the 150 Most Borrowed Author's from UK Libraries and the PLR (Public Lending Right) listed Laurence Anholt at position 146 in 2007/8. Anholt was included in the Independent on Sunday's Top 10 Children's Authors in the UK. 'The Hypnotist' was the overall winner of the Historical Winner Young Quills Award 2017, nominated for the Carnegie Medal and officially endorsed by Amnesty International in 2017.
