= Dexter Bexley and the Big Blue Beastie =

2007 children's book by Joel Stewart

- Author: Joel Stewart
- Illustrator: Joel Stewart
- Language: English
- Genre: Children's
- Publisher: Doubleday
- Publication date: 1 March 2007
- Publication place: United Kingdom
- Pages: 32 pp
- ISBN: 978-0-385-61005-6
- OCLC: 76361261

Dexter Bexley and the Big Blue Beastie is a children's picture book by Joel Stewart. It won the Nestlé Children's Book Prize Bronze Award.
