= Spilled Water =

Children's book by Sally Grindley

- First edition
- Author: Sally Grindley
- Language: English
- Genre: Children's
- Publisher: Bloomsbury
- Publication date: 2004
- Pages: 224 pp
- ISBN: 978-0-7475-6416-4
- OCLC: 56540448

Spilled Water is a children's novel by Sally Grindley, published in 2004. It won the Nestlé Children's Book Prize Gold Award and was longlisted for the Carnegie Medal. It tells the story of a Chinese girl, Lu Si-yan, who is sold into domestic service when she is just eleven years old. The story also tells of Lu Si-yan working as an underage worker in a factory sweatshop.

== Plot summary ==
The story is told in three parts: early childhood, life as a domestic servant and life working in a factory. It is told through the eyes of Lu Si-yan, an eleven-year-old girl.

Her early childhood is described as a rural idyll. She has a doting father who makes a living growing vegetables on a very small strip of land. A baby brother is born, whom Si-yan loves. But then her father is killed in a road accident and Si-yan's mother, overwhelmed by grief, cannot keep the family going when faced with one disaster after another. Disapproving Uncle Ba takes Lu Si-yan to market to sell her, calling her "Spilled Water": a waste because she is not a boy.

She joins the Chen household as an unpaid domestic servant. She is well fed and well clothed but is worked very hard and constantly criticised by Mrs Chen. Her only comforts are Xiong Fei, a fun-loving student employed as a cook, and Mr Chen's mother, Mrs Hong, who uses a wheelchair. Lu Si-yan is frightened by the Chens' son Yi-mou, whom she is told she must marry. He behaves strangely because of brain damage. Mrs Hong finds out what the Chens are planning, gives Lu Si-yan money and helps her to escape.

Lu Si-yan goes to catch the boat upriver, but discovers she has been robbed. A couple, Mr and Mrs Wong, offer to pay her boat fare and to give her a job in their factory. The factory makes toys. The employees work under harsh conditions. They are never paid what they are owed and are forced to work long hours and overtime. They are only paid a fraction of their salary in arrears, as the Wongs find constant cause for deducting money from their pay. Lu Si-yan is befriended by a group of young women who are optimistic despite being in the same state as Si-yan—trapped in the factory. Eventually, Lu Si-yan becomes so ill and frail, due to overwork and the poor working conditions, that she is hospitalised. When she regains consciousness, Uncle Ba is by her bedside in the hospital and is full of remorse. He brings news that her mother has died and says he wants to take her and her brother into his home, look after them properly and earn their forgiveness. Lu Si-yan realises that her only option is to go back with him, and she longs to see her brother. Her uncle promises to send her to school.

Li Mei, her closest friend at the factory, manages to get money from the Wongs for Lu Si-yan, and enough for Li Mei to return home as well. The Wongs pay up because they are terrified that their poor working conditions and exploitation of minors will be exposed.

The main themes of the book are the portrayal of rural versus town life in China, domestic servitude, sweatshops and the role of women.
