= Martin Waddell =

Irish writer (born 1941)

- Born: 10 April 1941 (age 85); Belfast, Northern Ireland
- Occupation: Writer
- Writing career
- Pen name: Catherine Sefton
- Genres: Children's literature; As Sefton: detective stories, mystery fiction, ghost stories
- Notable works: As Waddell: Big Bear, Little Bear
- Notable awards: Hans Christian Andersen Award for Writing; 2004

Martin Waddell (born 10 April 1941) is a writer of children's books from Belfast, Northern Ireland. He may be known best for his picture book texts featuring anthropomorphic animals, especially the Little Bear series illustrated by Barbara Firth (not to be confused with Minarik & Sendak's Little Bear series).

He also writes under the pen name Catherine Sefton for older children, primarily ghost stories and mystery fiction. The work by Sefton most widely held in WorldCat libraries is the novel In a Blue Velvet Dress (1972).

For his "lasting contribution" as a children's writer Waddell received the Hans Christian Andersen Medal in 2004.

== Early life and career ==
Waddell was born in Belfast, Northern Ireland, and has lived most of his life in neighbouring County Down, in Newcastle. As a child, he grew up with a fondness of animals and often told stories in a lively manner. This inspired him and "the love of story" stuck with Waddell ever since. He aspired at a young age to be a football player and signed for Fulham team; Waddell reflects that he scored a hat-trick on his debut in adult football but wound up as a goalkeeper.

When it became clear his future did not lie in professional football, Waddell turned to his other love and began to write (he would later combine the two in the Napper series of football-centred children's books). Originally, he wrote for adults; his first real success was a comic thriller, Otley, which was made into a film starring Tom Courtenay and Romy Schneider. After moving back to Northern Ireland in the late 1960s, he wrote books that reflected on the changing situation in his native land. Soon his love of storytelling would pull him into writing children's literature.

In 1972, he went into a church to stop some vandals and got caught up in an explosion in Donaghadee—an experience that took him years to overcome. As an author, nearly all of Waddell's stories are inspired by events or places in his life at the foot of the Mourne Mountains. As he wryly claimed, "I've been blown up, buried alive and had cancer as an adult, and survived all these experiences, so I'm a very lucky man."

Waddell and Firth won the Kurt Maschler Award, AKA the Emil, for The Park in the Dark (Walker, 1989). From 1982 to 1999, the award annually recognised one British "work of imagination for children, in which text and illustration are integrated so that each enhances and balances the other."

The biennial Hans Christian Andersen Award, conferred by the International Board on Books for Young People, is the highest career recognition available to a writer or illustrator of children's books. Waddell received the writing award in 2004.

== Selected works ==
Little Bear

The Little Bear picture books were written by Waddell, illustrated by Barbara Firth, and published by Walker Books.

- Can't You Sleep, Little Bear? New York: Harper & Row, (1988) – winner of the Smarties Prize (age 0–5 and overall)
- Let's Go Home, Little Bear New York: HarperCollins (1991)
- You and Me, Little Bear New York: HarperCollins (1996)
- Well Done, Little Bear New York: HarperCollins (1999); US title, Good Job, Little Bear
- Sleep Tight, Little Bear (2005)

An omnibus edition of the first four books was published for Borders in 2001.

Mimi Mouse

The Mimi Mouse picture books were written by Waddell and illustrated by Leo Hartas.

- Mimi and the Dream House (1995)
- Mimi and the Picnic (1995)
- Mimi's Christmas (1997)

Other picture books

- The Park in the Dark, 1989, illustrated by Barbara Firth, winner of the Kurt Maschler Award
- Farmer Duck (Walker, 1991), illustrated by Helen Oxenbury

– winner of the British Illustrated Children's Book of the Year and the Nestlé Smarties Book Prize (age 0–5 and overall); Oxenbury was a highly commended runner-up for the annual Greenaway Medal

- Owl Babies (Walker, 1992), illustrated by Patrick Benson

Novels

- In a Blue Velvet Dress New York: Harper & Row, (1972), as Catherine Sefton (Illustrated by Anne Yvonne Gilbert in 1991)
- The Back House Ghosts London: Faber and Faber, (1974), as Catherine Sefton (Illustrated by Anne Yvonne Gilbert in 1991)

== Awards ==
In November 2024, Waddell was given the "Lifetime Achievement Award" at the 2024 Irish Book Awards.
