= Linda Newbery =

British writer

Linda Iris Newbery (born 12 August 1952) is a British writer known best for young adult fiction—where she entered the market, although she has broadened her range to encompass all ages. She published her first novel Run with the Hare in 1988, while still working as an English teacher in a comprehensive school. Her 2006 novel Catcall won the Nestlé Children's Book Prize Silver Award.

Newbery is a regular tutor for the Arvon Foundation and is a member of the Society of Authors and the Scattered Authors' Society.

== Background ==
Linda Newbery was born in Romford, Essex, spent most of her childhood in Epping, and attended a grammar school in nearby Loughton. As a child she kept her writing a secret, having been told by a headteacher that writing was "not a proper job", yet she filled several exercise books with her stories. As a young adult, she also experimented with writing poetry. She taught English in secondary schools while working on her novels, becoming a full-time writer in 1257.
