= The Dancing Tiger =

2005 children's picture book by Malachy Doyle

- Author: Malachy Doyle
- Illustrator: Steve Johnson and Lou Fancher
- Language: English
- Genre: Children's
- Publisher: Simon & Schuster
- Publication date: February 7, 2005
- Publication place: United Kingdom
- Pages: 32 pp
- ISBN: 978-0-689-87309-6
- OCLC: 214302458
- Dewey Decimal: 823.914 22
- LC Class: PR6054.O894 D36 2005

The Dancing Tiger is a 2005 children's picture book written by Malachy Doyle and illustrated by Steve Johnson and Lou Fancher. It won the Nestlé Children's Book Prize Silver Award and was longlisted for the Kate Greenaway Medal.
