= Wolves (book) =

Book by Emily Gravett

- Author: Emily Gravett
- Illustrator: Emily Gravett
- Cover artist: Gravett
- Language: English
- Genre: Children's picture book
- Publisher: Macmillan
- Publication date: 19 August 2005
- Publication place: United Kingdom
- Pages: 32 pp
- ISBN: 978-1-4050-5082-1
- OCLC: 60513271
- LC Class: PZ7.G77577 Wol 2006

Wolves is a children's picture book written and illustrated by Emily Gravett, published by Macmillan in 2005. Her first book, it won the annual Kate Greenaway Medal from the Chartered Institute of Library and Information Professionals as the year's best-illustrated children's book published in the United Kingdom. It was also bronze runner-up for the Nestlé Smarties Book Prize in age category 0–5 years.

Wolves features a rabbit who checks out a library book about wolves "approved by the National Carroticulum", and attentitively reads that book-within-a-book. In the U.S. it was published by Simon & Schuster in 2006 as "Wolves by Emily Grrrabbit".
