= Liz Pichon =

British author and illustrator of children's books

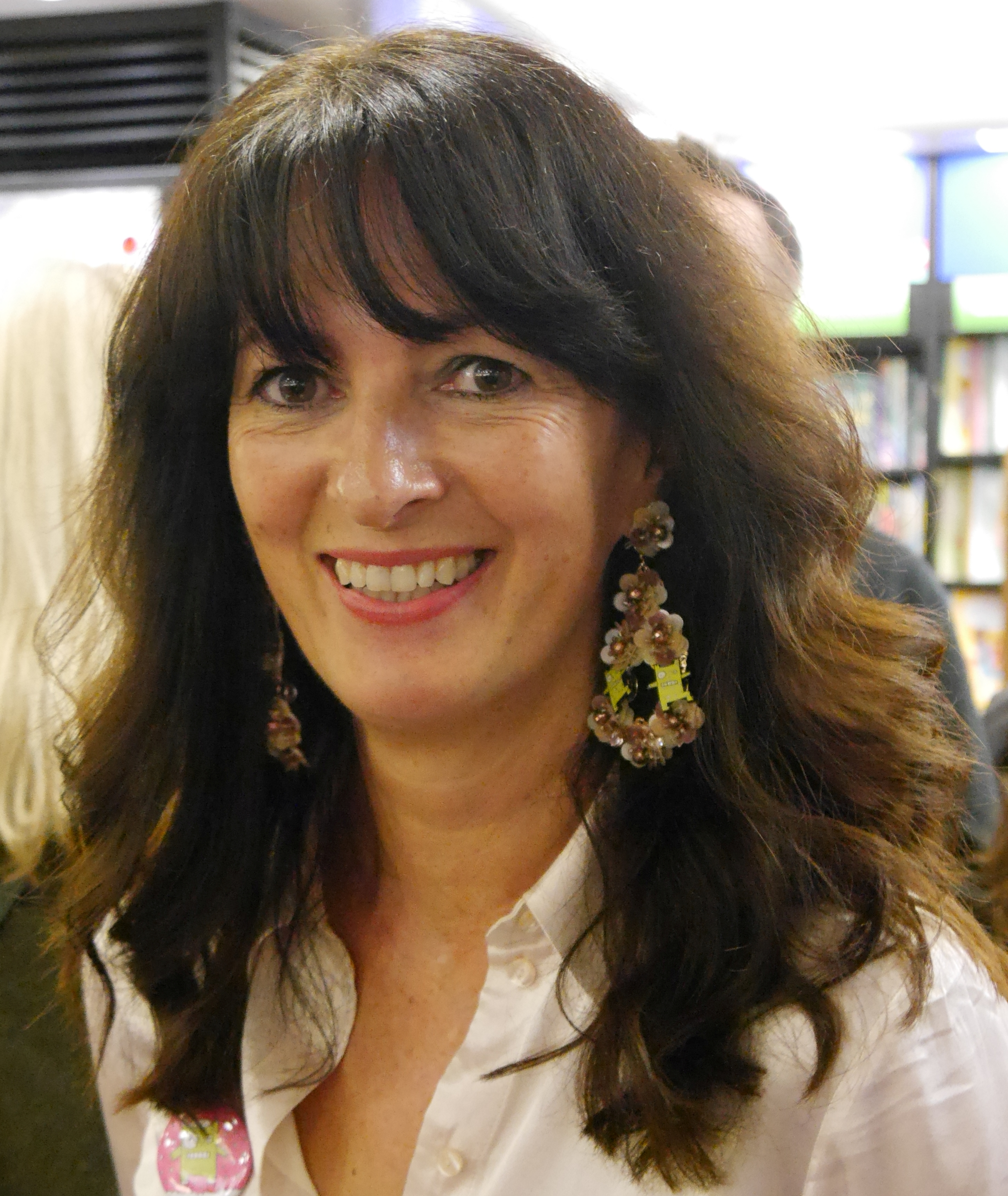
- Pichon in Waterstones at Piccadilly, London in 2018
- Born: 16 August 1963 (age 62) London, England
- Occupation: Author and illustrator
- Education: Camberwell School of Art
- Genres: Children's
- Notable works: Tom Gates series
- Spouse: Mark Flannery
- Children: 3

Website
- lizpichon.com

Liz Pichon (born 16 August 1963) is a British author and illustrator of children's books who is best known for her Tom Gates series of "satirical realist comedy fiction", which has sold 16.5 million copies and has been translated into 44 languages across 47 international markets.

== Early life ==
Liz Pichon was born on 16 August 1963 in London, England. She is the daughter of Francis and Joan Pichon. Pichon grew up in Hampstead. She attended Brookfield Primary School in Highgate and then St Augustine's in Kilburn. She received a BA in graphic design at the Camberwell School of Art. Her first job was as an art director for the music label Jive Records, a position she held between 1987 and 1990.

== Books ==
Her Tom Gates series was first published in 2011. There are currently 23 books in the Tom Gates series, as well as a special £1 book produced for World Book Day in 2013, a Tom Gates Annual, a Tom Gates Activity Book and a Tom Gates Music Book.

Shoe Wars, Pichon's new middle-grade title, was published in October 2020 during lockdown and has sold 95,000 copies.

Meet The Mubbles is a graphic novel series, published by Macmillan Children's books in 2025.

== Events ==
In 2016, Pichon created the "Kids' Tapestry", a children's version of the Bayeux Tapestry, featuring historical events to the mark the 950th anniversary of the Battle of Hastings.

In 2017, Pichon, Horsenden Primary School and her publisher, Scholastic Children's Books, broke the Guinness World Record for the largest disco dance.

== Personal life ==
Pichon is dyslexic. In 1990, she married Mark Flannery and they have three children: one son and two daughters. They currently live in Brighton.

== Awards ==
- 1998 National Parenting Publications Award, Twilight Rhymes Moonlight Verse, poetry compiled by Mary Joslin and illustrated by Pichon, 1997
- Roald Dahl Funny Prize 2011
- Red House Children's Book Award 2012
- Waterstones Children's Book Prize 2012 for Best Fiction for 5-12 Year Olds
- Blue Peter Book Award for Best Story 2013
- Winner - The LOLLIES Best Laugh Out Loud Book for 9-13 2018 - Tom Gates Epic Adventures (Kind Of)

Runner-up:

- 2004: Silver Award, Nestlé Smarties Book Prize (0–5 years), My Big Brother Boris
- 2012: Finalist, Red House Children's Book Award and the Stockport Schools Book Award, The Three Horrid Pigs and the Big Friendly Wolf
- 2012: Shortlisted for the Specasvers National Book Awards Children's Book of the Year, Genius Ideas (Mostly)

The Brilliant World of Tom Gates - TV SHOW - BAFTA SCOTLAND 2021 Award - WINNER Best Entertainment

Writers: Ben Ward, Liz Pichon.

BRITISH ANIMATION AWARDS: Children's Choice Award

SHOE WARS - WINNER 2022 (SPAIN) FESTILIJC3 Torre del Agua Translation By Daniel Cortes Coronas

== Adaptations ==
2019 Tom Gates Live's stage adaptation (co-written by Pichon and Neal Foster of Birmingham Stage Company) toursed the UK.

2020 Pichon and Flannery launched their Tremendous Tales podcast.

2021 Tom Gates: The Album is released, featuring songs from Tom Gates written by Pichon and Flannery.

2021 The Brilliant World of Tom Gates TV adaptation launches on Sky Kids, with Pichon co-writing and presenting. Innovative mix of animation, songs, and creative makes & draws. Third series launched January 2024. Awards: Scottish BAFTA; British Animation Awards Children’s Choice; Kidscreen Best Mixed Media series

2024 A Tom Gates feature film in development.

Pichon also designed the 2022 and 2023 Children in Need T-shirts for the BBC, which have been the most successful T-shirts in the charity’s history.

== Works ==
=== Outside of Tom Gates ===
- My Big Brother, Boris (Scholastic, 2004)
- Bored Bill (Little Tiger, 2015)
- Penguins (London: Gullane Children's Books, 2008)
- The Three Horrid Pigs and the Big Friendly Wolf (Little Tiger, 2008); US title, The Three Horrid Little Pigs (Tiger Tales, 2008)
- Shoe Wars (Scholastic UK, 2020)
- Meet The Mubbles (Macmillan Children's Publishers) Book 1 coming 2025

==== As illustrator only (selected) ====
- Twilight Rhymes Moonlight Verse, compiled by Mary Joslin (Oxford: Lion Children's Books, 1997)
- Spinderella, written by Julia Donaldson (Egmont UK, 2002)
- Beautiful Bananas, Elizabeth Laird (Oxford, 2003)
- The Three Billy Goats Fluff, Rachael Mortimer (Hodder Children's Books, 2010)
- Red Riding Hood and the Sweet Little Wolf, Rachael Mortimer (Hodder, 2012)

=== Tom Gates series ===
- The Brilliant World of Tom Gates
- Tom Gates: Excellent Excuses (and Other Good Stuff)
- Tom Gates: Everything's Amazing (Sort Of)
- Tom Gates: Genius Ideas (Mostly)
- Tom Gates Is Absolutely Fantastic (at Some Things)
- Tom Gates: Best Book Day Ever! (So Far) Tom Gates: Extra Special Treats (not)
- Tom Gates: A Tiny Bit Lucky
- Tom Gates: Yes! No (Maybe...) (2015)
- Tom Gates: Top of the Class (Nearly) (2015)
- Tom Gates: Super Good Skills (Almost...) (2016)
- Tom Gates: DogZombies Rule (for Now) (2016)
- Tom Gates: Family, Friends and Furry Creatures (2017)
- Tom Gates: Epic Adventure (Kind Of) (2017)
- Tom Gates: Totally Brilliant Annual (2017)
- Tom Gates: Biscuits, Bands and Very Big Plans (2018)
- Tom Gates: What Monster? (2018)
- Tom Gates: Mega Make and Do (and Stories Too!) (2019)
- Tom Gates: Spectacular School Trip (Really!) (2019)
- Tom Gates: Ten Tremendous Tales (2021)
- Tom Gates: Random Acts of Fun (2021)
- Tom Gates: Happy to Help (2022)
- Tom Gates: Five Star Stories (2023)
- Tom Gates: Book Of Everything (2024)(Journal)
- Tom Gates: Is Ha Ha Hilarious (Oct 2024)
