= That Pesky Rat =

2002 book by Lauren Child

- Front cover
- Author: Lauren Child
- Illustrator: Lauren Child
- Language: English
- Genre: Children's picture book
- Publisher: Orchard Books
- Publication date: 23 May 2002
- Publication place: United Kingdom
- Pages: 32 pp
- ISBN: 978-1-84121-830-4
- OCLC: 48979470
- LC Class: PZ7.C4383 Th 2002

That Pesky Rat is a British children's picture book written and illustrated by Lauren Child and published by Orchard UK in 2002. It won the Nestlé Smarties Book Prize in ages category 6–8 years and it was commended runner up for the Kate Greenaway Medal from the professional librarians, recognising the year's best-illustrated British children's book. (Note: Today there are usually eight books on the Greenaway shortlist. According to CCSU, some runners up through 2002 were Commended (from 1959) or Highly Commended (from 1974). There were 99 commendations of both kinds in 44 years, finally Child alone in 2002.)

Candlewick Press published a US edition in the same year.

In 2008, a special UNESCO edition was published in the UK. All author and publisher profits from this book now go to support UNESCO projects around the world.

== Plot ==
The story is narrated by a rat who wishes he could live the life of a proper pet. He visits several friends who are proper pets, including a chinchilla and a cat. However, he doesn't like the way any of them live. In the end, he puts up signs, asking if there is any one who wants a rat as a pet, and goes to a pet store. He is finally taken home from the store by an old man with poor eyesight who sees him in the display window and mistakes him for a cat. In the end, the rat says that he doesn't mind pretending to be a cat and that he likes his life as a pet.
