= Livi Michael =

British fiction writer

- Born: Olivia Wood; 15 March 1960 (age 66); Stalybridge, Greater Manchester, UK
- Citizenship: British
- Education: B.A (English), PhD
- Occupation: Novelist
- Children: Paul and Ben
- Writing career
- Genre: Fiction
- Notable work: The Whispering Road (2005)
- Website: www.livimichael.com

Livi Michael (15 March 1960, Manchester, UK), also known as Olivia Michael, is a British fiction writer who publishes children and adult novels.

== Career ==
Michael began writing poetry at the age of seven. She attended Tameside College of Technology; University of Leeds and completed her B.A (English) with first-class honours in 1989. Her career as a novelist started with her first novel, Under a Thin Moon in 1992. In addition to her writing, Michael also worked as a university lecturer teaching creative writing, and ran reading groups about women's fiction.

She began writing novels for adults in 1992, before writing her first children's novel in 2002, called Frank and the Black Hamster of Narkiz. While she was in the process of writing her first novel, she continued her education and completed her doctorate in 1993 at the University of Leeds, where she earned a dissertation named Towards a Theory of Working Class Writing: Lewis Grassic Gibbon's A Scots Quair in the Context of Earlier Working Class Fiction. Livi Michael completed her second novel while teaching English literature and creative writing part-time at Manchester Metropolitan University until 1998. She went on to teach English literature and creative writing for the Department of Cultural Studies at Sheffield Hallam University as well as writing novels for children, giving workshops and visiting schools.

== Writing influences ==
One of her influences comes from the fact that she was raised in a single-parent home by her mother and was a single mother herself, which made her aware of the effects of poverty on women's lives. She highlights the world of poor and working-class women through the characters in her novels.

One of the factors that influenced her children's books was her son's hamster named "Frank". She describes Frank as an "adventurous hamster, and something of an escapologist".

== Notable works ==
=== Under a Thin Moon (1992) ===
Livi Michael's first novel, Under a Thin Moon (1992) depicts the lives of four working-class women living on a Manchester council estate, during the period of British Conservative politician Margaret Thatcher. Political elements such as capitalism and patriarchy are prominent in the novel, and criticised for the impoverished state of the women as they struggle with poverty and unemployment.

=== Frank and the Black Hamster of Narkiz (2002) ===
Frank and the Black Hamster of Narkiz (2002) is a novel for younger children. It is a story of a brave hamster named Frank, who escapes from his cage and undertakes an adventurous journey to meet the mysterious black hamster of Narkiz. After the success of the first novel, Michael went on to write a series of novels on Frank's adventures.

=== The Whispering Road (2005) ===
This young adult novel mixed history and fantasy to look at issues such as death, disease and abandonment through the lives of siblings Joe and Anne.

== Awards and honors ==
Books	Awards
Under a Thin Moon (1992)	Arthur Welton Award (1992), Society of Authors award (1992).
Their Angel Reach (1994)	John Steinbeck Award shortlist (1994), and John Llewellyn Rhys Award shortlist (1994), and Geoffrey Faber Memorial Prize (1995), Society of Authors award.
All the Dark Air (1997)	The Mind (charity) Book of the Year Award/Allen Lane Award shortlist (1997), Society of Authors Award.
Frank and the Black Hamster of Narkiz (2002)	Branford Boase Award shortlist (2002).
The Whispering Road (2005)	Bronze award, Nestlé Children's Book Prize (2005).

== Bibliography ==
=== Books for adults ===
- 2023 Reservoir, Salt
- 2016 Ascension (Part 3), Penguin
- 2015 Succession (Part 2), St. Martin's Press
- 2015 Rebellion (Part 1), Penguin
- 2000 Inheritance, Penguin
- 1997 All the Dark Air, Secker & Warburg
- 1994 Their Angel Reach, Secker & Warburg
- 1992 Under a Thin Moon, Secker & Warburg

=== Books for older children ===
- 2012 Malkin Child, Foxtail
- 2009 Faerie Heart, Puffin
- 2005 The Whispering Road, Puffin
- 2006 The Angel Stone, Puffin
- 2008 Sky Wolves, Puffin

=== Books for younger children ===
- 2023 Goose Girl
- 2009 43 Bin Street
- 2007 City of Dogs, Putnam
- 2006 Seventeen Times as High as the Moon, Orchard
- 2005 Frank and the New Narkiz, Puffin
- 2004 Frank and the Flames of Truth, Puffin
- 2003 Frank and the Chamber of Fear, Puffin
- 2002 Frank and the Black Hamster of Narkiz, Puffin

== Personal life ==
Michael has two sons and lives in Oldham, Lancashire.
