= Satoshi Kitamura =

Japanese artist and children's writer (born 1956)

Satoshi Kitamura (きたむら さとし, Kitamura Satoshi; born 1956) is a Japanese children's picture book author and illustrator. In 1983, he received the Mother Goose Award for the Most Exciting Newcomer to British Illustration for Angry Arthur (written by Hiawyn Oram). In 2000, his book, Sheep in Wolves' Clothing was made into the obscure HIT Entertainment series, Sheeep. He moved from Japan to London before returning to Tokyo in 2009.

== Biography ==
Satoshi Kitamura was born in 1956 in Tokyo. After dropping out of school to pursue art, Kitamura decided not to attempt a 10-year apprenticeship as a potter and instead worked as a graphic artist. He was not trained as an artist, but at the age of 19 began to do commercial work as an illustrator for adverts and magazines. He moved from Tokyo to London in 1979 where he worked mainly at designing greeting cards. More than twenty publishers declined his work until Alison Sage, a children's book editor, introduced him to Klaus Flugge of Andersen Press. Flugge asked him to illustrate Angry Arthur in 1981, after an exhibition of his work at the Neal Street Gallery in Covent Garden. Since then he has published more than 20 of his own books, as well as illustrating many more.

He says that when he was young he read comics and admits that these have had a great influence on his style. He refers to kamishibai as an early influence, as well as the story of Heinrich Schliemann told by a primary school teacher. His work is known for quirky perspectives, brilliant watercolours, attention to detail and unique characters and for regularly including animals or animal characters, most frequently cats. Boots the cat is a recurring Kitamura character featuring in two board books and The Comic Adventures of Boots, a picture book whose style is reminiscent of graphic novels and comics.

Regular collaborators include Hiawyn Oram, Roger McGough and John Agard. Kitamura worked with Colin McNaughton to create Once Upon an Ordinary School Day, published in 2004, In 2000, Sheep in Wolves' Clothing was adapted into an animated series by HIT Entertainment (who later acquired Pingu, originally made by The Pygos Group; Fireman Sam, originally made by Bumper Films; and Thomas & Friends, originally made by Britt Allcroft Productions) that was animated by Grand Slamm Children's Films (who had also worked with HIT to animate Kipper, Percy the Park Keeper and Angelina Ballerina for CITV) and screened on CBBC, lasted two seasons. The show starred Absolutely Fabulous actress Julia Sawalha as the voice of the character Georgina.

In 2009, he left London and returned to Japan to care for his parents, but continues to travel and work for publishers across the globe. Apart from writing and illustrating children's books, Satoshi has been commissioned for various projects including Tokyo Underground posters, signage at Birmingham Children's Hospital and designing stationery. He also translates David McKee's Elmer the Patchwork Elephant series for the Japanese market.

== Awards ==
- Mother Goose Award for the Most Exciting Newcomer to British Illustration for Angry Arthur, written by Hiawyn Oram. (1983)
- The New York Times Notable Book of the Year for When Sheep Cannot Sleep
- National Art Library Award (from the Victoria and Albert Museum for his illustrations in A Ring of Words, a poetry anthology edited by Roger McGough (1999)).
- Smarties Silver Award for Me and My Cat? (2000)

== Reviews ==
- 'The bold, bright, beautiful style of Satoshi Kitamura stands out like a beacon.' (T.E.S.)
- 'There could be no better way to start than with Kitamura's wonderful illustrations.' (Observer)
- 'Satoshi Kitamura has produced some of the most delightful picture books of the last dozen years.' (New York Times Book Review)

== Books illustrated ==
- The Smile Shop by Satoshi Kitamura, 2020
- Hat Tricks by Satoshi Kitamura, 2019
- Twinkle, Twinkle Firefly by John Agard, Grace Nichols, 2010
- Tiger Dead! Tiger Dead! Stories from the Caribbean by John Agard, Grace Nichols, 2009
- Millie's Marvellous Hat by Satoshi Kitamura, 2009, shortlisted for the Kate Greenaway Medal
- The Young Inferno by John Agard, 2008
- Let's Send an Efuto by Satoshi Kitamura, Motoko Matsuda, 2007
- Stone Age Boy by Satoshi Kitamura, 2007
- What's Wrong with My Hair? by Satoshi Kitamura, 2007
- Efuto by Satoshi Kitamura, 2007
- Play With Me! by Satoshi Kitamura, 2007
- Hello, Who's There? by Satoshi Kitamura, 2006
- Jackdaw Jinx by Kathy Ashford, 2006
- The Carnival of the Animals by Gerard Benson, Judith Chernaik, Cicely Herbert (editors), 2005
- Pablo the Artist by Satoshi Kitamura 2005
- Igor, the Bird that Couldn't Sing by Satoshi Kitamura, 2005
- Once Upon an Ordinary School Day by Colin McNaughton, 2004
- Hello H2O by John Agard, 2003
- Einstein: The Girl Who Hated Maths by John Agard, 2002
- Under the Moon and Over the Sea by John Agard, Grace Nichols (editors), Satoshi Kitamura (contributing illustrator), 2002
- The Comic Adventures of Boots by Satoshi Kitamura 2002 review
- For Every Child the Rights of the Child by Desmond Tutu (foreword) Satoshi Kitamura (contributor), 2000
- Points of View with Professor Peekaboo by John Agard, 2000
- Weblines by John Agard, 2000
- Me and My Cat? by Satoshi Kitamura, 1999
- Kaze, Tsmetai Kaze, (The Wind, The Called Wind) by Leslie Norris, 1999
- Morris MacMillipede - the Toast of Brussels Sprout by Mick Fitzmaurice, 1999
- The Spotted Unicorn by Roger McGough, 1998
- A Friend for Boots by Satoshi Kitamura, 1998
- Bathtime Boots by Satoshi Kitamura, 1998
- The Ring of Words, Roger McGough (editor), 1998
- From the Devil's Pulpit by John Agard, 1997
- Cat is Sleepy by Satoshi Kitamura, 1997
- Dog is Thirsty by Satoshi Kitamura, 1997
- Duck is Dirty by Satoshi Kitamura, 1997
- Squirrel is Hungry by Satoshi Kitamura, 1997
- Goldfish Hide And Seek by Satoshi Kitamura, 1997
- Out of the Deep by Hiawyn Oram, 1996
- Sheep in Wolves' Clothing by Satoshi Kitamura, 1996 (Adapted into a TV series by HIT Entertainment in 2000)
- Paper Dinosaurs: A cut-out book by Satoshi Kitamura 1996
- The adventures of Morris MacMillipede by Mick Fitzmaurice, 1996
- Fly with the Birds: A word and rhyme book by Richard Edwards, 1996
- We animals would like a word with you by John Agard, 1996
- Eureka!: Me and my Body by Stephen Webster, 1994
- Eureka!: Inside my House by Stephen Webster, 1994
- Eureka!: Living and Working Together by Brenda Walpole, 1994
- Eureka!: Hello, is anyone there? by Brenda Walpole, 1994
- A Boy wants a Dinosaur by Hiawyn Oram, 1993
- A Creepy Crawly Song Book by Carl Lewis (music) Hiawyn Oram (lyrics), 1993
- The Oxfam Book of Children's Stories: South and North, East and West by Michael Rosen (editor), 1992
- From Acorn to Zoo and Everything in Between In Alphabetical Order by Satoshi Kitamura, 1992
- Lily takes a Walk by Satoshi Kitamura, 1991
- Speaking for Ourselves by Hiawyn Oram, 1990
- UFO Diary by Satoshi Kitamura, 1989
- Ned and the Joybaloo by Hiawyn Oram, 1989
- A Children's Chorus (anthology), 1989
- Captain Toby by Satoshi Kitamura, 1988
- When Sheep Cannot Sleep: The counting book by Satoshi Kitamura, 1988
- In the Attic by Hiawyn Oram, 1988
- My Friend Mr. Morris (Share-A-Story) by Pat Thomsen, 1988
- Scrapyard by Andy Soutter, 1988
- What's Inside: The Alphabet book by Satoshi Kitamura, 1987
- The Happy Christmas Book (anthology) by Alison Sage (compiled by) Helen Wire (compiled by), 1987
- Paper Jungle: A cut-out book by Satoshi Kitamura, 1986
- The Flying Trunk Naomi Lewis, 1986
- Sky in the Pie by Roger McGough, 1985
- The Great Games Book by Satoshi Kitamura (contributor) 1985
- Angry Arthur by Hiawyn Oram, 1983
