= Pauline Fisk =

British children's writer (1948–2015)

- Born: 27 September 1948; Wimbledon, London, England
- Died: 25 January 2015 (aged 66); Shrewsbury, Shropshire, England

Pauline Millicent Fisk (27 September 1948 – 25 January 2015) was a British children's author. Her 1990 book, Midnight Blue, was awarded the Nestlé Smarties Book Prize Gold award. In 1992, Fisk published her second book "Telling the Sea", set in the Welsh coast.

Fisk went on to publish "The Secret of Sabrina Fludde" (2002), "The Candle House" (1999), "The Red Judge" (2005), "Flying for Frankie" (2009) and "In the Trees" (2010) before her death in 2015.

She was one of the writers on the children's animation series Lavender Castle.

Fisk died of oesophageal cancer on the 25th of January 2015.
