= Double Act (novel) =

1995 novel by Jacqueline Wilson

- First edition
- Author: Jacqueline Wilson
- Illustrator: Sue Heap; Nick Sharratt co-illustrators
- Language: English
- Genre: Children's novel
- Publisher: Yearling Books, Doubleday, Corgi
- Publication date: 1995
- Media type: Print
- Pages: 192 pp
- Reading age: 9–12-year olds

Double Act is a children's novel by Jacqueline Wilson, written in the style of a diary, which features identical twins Ruby and Garnet. Ruby and Garnet love each other dearly but they are completely different. Ruby is loud, outgoing and wild though Garnet is shy, quiet and kind. It was published in 1995, co-illustrated by Sue Heap and Nick Sharratt, and it won both the Nestlé Smarties Book Prize (ages 9–11 years and overall) and the Red House Children's Book Award.

Double Act was "Highly Commended" runner up for the annual Carnegie Medal from the British Library Association, recognising the year's best children's book by a British subject. That commendation was approximately annual at the time. The 1995 Medal winner, Northern Lights by Philip Pullman, was named one of the top ten by a panel of experts and was voted the public favourite for the 70th anniversary "Carnegie of Carnegies" in 2007.

== Plot summary ==
The book takes the form of the twins alternately narrating the story of their life in an accounts book. Ruby and Garnet are 10-year-old identical twins living with their father and grandmother since their mother, Opal, died. The two have always been close despite their differences—Ruby is sociable, headstrong, and dreams of being an actress, while introverted Garnet is content to let Ruby dominate their relationship. The twins have their own secret language, and they don't like to make friends at school because they have each other. When their father gets a new girlfriend, Rose, and a new job, their once stable relationship is thrown into turmoil, as the relationship leads to feelings of betrayal from their father to their late mother, and it comes with a price—leaving their grandmother behind for a bookshop in the country.

Ruby insists that the girls should not stand for their new lifestyle. They get into trouble with the village bullies after throwing mud at them. Garnet starts off well in new school and works hard, but once she makes a new friend called Judy, Ruby sulks and ignores her twin. Garnet quickly changes her actions to repair their relationship. After this, they do not behave properly in school and do not talk to anyone else. They never listen to Rose and feel angry and neglected.

Ruby finds an article about auditions for a TV adaptation of The Twins at St. Clare's, and is keen for the two of them to go ahead and audition, even though Garnet strongly declines and their father doesn't agree. Surprisingly, Rose is supportive, although her efforts are for nothing, Ruby plots and succeeds in them running away to London for the audition. When their moment comes, Ruby confidently does her audition well. Garnet however is very scared, and is about to try to deliver a good audition, but their father appears just as she is about to begin, and she cannot say anything. She then feels terrible for spoiling Ruby's chance at fame.

Near summer, Ruby, realizing that the TV movie is being filmed at a prestigious boarding school for girls, Marnock Heights, fixates on the idea of the twins becoming " the real Twins at St Clare's" and decides that the pair ought to sign up for scholarships—of which there is only one. Despite their father's early hesitation to the idea, he ultimately agrees, and they sit the entrance exam. Ruby is disgusted by Garnet's descriptive and mature writing but remains confident they will both pass. It is later revealed that only Garnet won the scholarship. Ruby is devastated as she was confident that she would win it if they both could not 'wangle one' together. Garnet is torn between pleasing her sister and doing something different, for once. Meanwhile, Ruby refuses to talk to her, and often wanders off on her own. She is determined to be different from Garnet and ends up cutting her hair short in pursuit of that goal.

She does not let herself be around Garnet for the whole summer, and even though they both feel as though they are missing something, Ruby is too proud to apologize while Garnet is sad and misses her. After making friends with someone she previously considered rather a bully, Ruby starts to realize that she and Garnet do not need to be the same, and do not have to do the same things, to be happy. She also realizes, alternately, that being together would have helped Garnet feel better about leaving. Ruby finds a friend in Rose, also, who encourages her to say sorry to Garnet. During this portion of the book, Ruby writes in a notepad which says MEMORANDUM on the cover.

In the end, Ruby apologizes to Garnet, and they both realize that they can still be together while apart, as long as they remember each other. Garnet leaves for the school, and writes a letter about how much she is enjoying it.

A further story about the twins, where Garnet comes home for Christmas after her first term at Marnock Heights, appears in The Jacqueline Wilson Christmas Cracker. Adult versions of Ruby and Garnet also appear in The Butterfly Club. Ruby has become a children's television presenter named Ruby Red, and Garnet is a scriptwriter and producer.

== Adaptation ==
The television film was made in 2001 for Channel 4 and aired in 2002, starring Birmingham twins, Zoe and Chloe Tempest-Jones.

== Critical reception ==
Publishers Weekly described it as "an unexceptional mix of familiar plot devices" and recommended it (or did not) for readers age 9 to 12.
