= Me and My Cat? =

1999 children's picture book by Satoshi Kitamura

- Author: Satoshi Kitamura
- Illustrator: Satoshi Kitamura
- Language: English
- Genre: Children's picture book
- Published: 1999 (Andersen Press)
- Publication place: England
- Media type: Print (paperback)
- Pages: 32 (unpaginated)
- ISBN: 9781842707753
- OCLC: 1263586856

Me and My Cat? is a 1999 children's picture book by Satoshi Kitamura. It is about a boy, Nicholas, who switches bodies with his cat, Leonardo. Nicolas's story (Me and My Cat) appeared in a PBS/PBS Kids show. That is, Between the Lions.

== Plot ==
Ten year old Nicholas does not want to go to school. One night, a witch appears in Nicholas's bedroom. She brandishes her broom, says magic words, and leaves without even saying goodbye. The next morning, Nicholas's mom comes in and (happily) says/chants "Rise and shine!". But she (angrily) warns Nicholas that if he is not awake, he is going to be late for school. And if his school has to wait, they are going to be very upset. She drags him out of bed and into the bathroom. And she makes him wash and dress. But she is unaware that Nicholas and his cat Leonardo have swapped bodies and positions. At breakfast time, his mother interrupts his breakfast. (For breakfast, instead of Nicholas eating his real human food and Leonardo eating his real cat food, they—as they've swapped positions—do not eat the correct breakfast foods for breakfast. Nicholas eats Leonardo's cat food and Leonardo eats Nicholas's human food.) Nicholas realizes he and his cat, Leonardo, have switched bodies.

As a result, Nicholas goes to school, but remains at home. Because Nicholas and Leonardo swapped bodies, Nicholas is not using his regular schedule.

Nicholas's mom looks at Nicholas nervously. She gets worried and sees that something is wrong with her son. At first, she is worried/nervous, but then turns into an outrage. Because she is concerned about Nicholas's schedule. That is, since he is acting like a cat and not a person. She calls the doctor and asks him to "come at once". After examining Nicholas, the doctor states that the tests came back. And he reveals that Nicholas "is just a little overtired". So he recommends that he (Nicholas) goes to bed early and should be okay in the morning. Nicholas's mom is still very upset and worried. She hugs Nicholas (in Leonardo's body), who begins to purr. Then Leonardo (in Nicholas's body) begins to purr as well.

The witch returns to Nicholas's room, apologizes, and says she "had the wrong address". She brandishes her broom at Nicholas and Leonardo, says magic words, and leaves without saying goodnight. In the morning, Nicholas's mom wakes him up, and he realizes he has been returned to his own body.

Everything is back to normal, and Nicholas is able to wake up on a regular schedule. He gets dressed, follows his morning schedule, eats his breakfast, and goes to school.

At school, it is revealed that Nicholas's principal (Mr. McGough) owns a pet cat. And he has switched bodies with his own cat. Nicholas reveals that Mr. McGough "scratched himself, licked his shirt, and fell asleep". (The principal—now in his cat's position—stated that he was going to be asleep for the rest of the lesson. And for the rest of the school year actually.) That is, when Nicholas—for not being at school the day before—was sent to the principal's office (by one of his teachers) and saw the principal. So Mr. McGough is in the position of his own cat and his own cat is in the position of Mr. McGough. As a result, the same things are going to happen in Nicholas's dreams. But it is not going to be Nicholas who causes it.

== Reception ==
In a review, the New York Times wrote "Kitamura's art resembles the animation seen on the Cartoon Network, edgy and angular, a style that becomes a barrier to the artist's intent when the plan is to depict the smooth, springy suppleness of cats. And that -- evoking memories of familiar feline postures for the sake of a laugh -- is what this book is all about. Still, many children will no doubt respond with laugh-track chuckles, especially to the sight of a boy squatting in a litter box. My test audience -- that is, my inner 6-year-old -- obviously did not." while Kirkus Reviews calls it "Silly good fun." and Publishers Weekly wrote "this latest by Kitamura spotlights an offbeat sense of humor and a flair for comic-book layout."

It has also been reviewed by Booklist, the School Library Journal, and The Horn Book Magazine.

== Awards and nominations ==
- Kurt Maschler Award - nominated
- 2000 Silver Smarties Book Award - won

== Adaptations ==
Me and My Cat? has been adapted for the stage.
