= Lavender Castle =

1999 British TV science fiction series

- Genre: Adventure; Children's; Fantasy; Science fiction
- Created by: Rodney Matthews
- Written by: Gerry Anderson; Pauline Fisk; Chris Trengove
- Directed by: Chris Taylor
- Voices of: Kate Harbour; Jimmy Hibbert; David Holt; Rob Rackstraw
- Music by: Crispin Merrell
- Country of origin: United Kingdom
- Original language: English
- No. of series: 1
- No. of episodes: 26

Production
- Executive producers: Craig Hemmings; Brian Cosgrove
- Producer: Gerry Anderson
- Running time: 10 minutes
- Production companies: Cosgrove Hall Films; Carrington Productions International

Original release
- Network: ITV (CITV)
- Release: 7 January 1999 – 9 March 2000

Lavender Castle is a British stop motion/CGI science fantasy television series created by Rodney Matthews and produced by Gerry Anderson. It was produced in 1997 through a collaboration between Carrington Productions International and Cosgrove Hall Films, and was first broadcast on CITV from 1999 to 2000.

The series follows the story of Captain Thrice and his crew, on a quest to find the peaceful city of Lavender Castle before the evil Dr. Agon.

== Series overview ==
Lavender Castle is a place of mystery and legend, fabled throughout the universe, a floating city of light, a place of peace, harmony and all the things that have ever been dreamt of. It is the centre of the universe and the greatest source of power – should it be destroyed, the universe would be plunged into darkness forever. Evil scientist Dr. Agon plans to do just that. A lonely megalomaniac with technology-assisted powers of transmutation, he yearns for darkness and has pledged to destroy Lavender Castle from his fortress spaceship, the Dark Station, the most destructive power in the universe, crewed by unseen slaves working deep in the bowels.

To prevent this, Captain Thrice has set out on a quest to find the elusive Lavender Castle before Agon does and protect it at the same time. A previous encounter with Lavender Castle gave life to Thrice's walking stick and left the Captain with a special knowledge of its power and abilities. Travelling in his cottage spaceship, the Paradox, Thrice assembles a crew of misfits to join him in his quest, combating evil wherever they find it as they travel the universe searching for clues that will lead them to Lavender Castle. But Lavender Castle works in mysterious ways and lends its power to the Paradox crew to protect them when they most need help.

== Characters ==
=== Protagonists ===
- Captain Thrice: the wise, elderly three-eyed captain of the Paradox, always accompanied by his talking, sentient walking stick. Years before, he fortuitously came across Lavender Castle during his space travels, and since that time, is bent on finding it again to try and protect it from Dr. Agon. Voiced by David Holt.
- Walking Stick: Captain Thrice's talking, sentient walking stick, who was given life when Thrice previously came across Lavender Castle. She maintains a link with the castle, and at desperate moments, she can produce a lavender ray to neutralise even the toughest of opponents. Voiced by Kate Harbour.
- Roger: An Australander who is the Paradox's pilot, anciently a Starfighter pilot in the Space Force, then a freelance mercenary and space freighter pilot before being captured by Short Fred Ledd, along with his last passenger Lyca. Talented and heroic, but also reckless and gung-ho, Roger has a tendency to act before thinking, which sometimes leads the whole crew into troubles. He seems often bent on impressing the lovely Lyca, but fails most of the time. Voiced by Rob Rackstraw.
- Isambard: Captain Thrice's first mate and engineer, in charge of the Paradox's engines. A brilliant mechanic, his methods are however rather unorthodox (for instance, whacking the central engine with his hammer to make it work is always a viable solution for him). He is very proud of his position and refers to the Paradox's engine as his "baby". He also invented many gadgets in the past; "some of them even work", according to him. He is named after Isambard Kingdom Brunel, an important figure of the Industrial Revolution. Sometime before the series started, Isambard had his own ship which he accidentally blew up, and was rescued by Captain Thrice shortly after. Voiced by Rob Rackstraw.
- Lyca: The Paradox's Floran doctor, a medical student, a talented healer, and an adept of herbal medicine, who joined the crew after being freed from Short Fred Ledd along with Roger. Lyca is a very sweet and gentle soul, but she is also far removed from the classic Damsel in distress stereotype, being on the contrary quite brave and adventurous. She is very protective of Sproggle and tends to see him as a little brother. Voiced by Kate Harbour.
- Sir Squeakalot: A robot designed to look like a knight's suit of armour, but who behaves more like a mild-mannered and nervous servant. He is the Paradox's housekeeper, originally owned by Queen Zarla before her ship, the QZ3, was sunk and he was captured by Short Fred Ledd. Somewhat phlegmatic and refined, he is much of a gentleman and speaks in a distinguished English accent. He tends to be moderately nervous around Isambard, who seems often bent on having him test his new inventions. As well as being Squeakalot's former owner, Queen Zarla also knighted Squeakalot for his outstanding ability to reason. Voiced by Jimmy Hibbert.
- Sproggle: The Paradox's lovable but extremely incompetent navigator, who would like to define himself as such, while he can hardly tell his left from his right. Originally an orphaned child who served as Short Fred Ledd's navigator in the Cutting Snark's crows nest before being rescued by Captain Thrice. Gentle, naïve and easily bewildered, Sproggle also has a somewhat simplistic syntax, usually speaking in third person and with very few words. "Oooooh... Sproggle scared!" seems to be one of his favourite expressions. He has the ability to see through Dr. Agon's many disguises and also unknowingly carries the final clue to finding Lavender Castle. Voiced by David Holt.

=== Antagonists ===
- Dr. Cedric Agon: The series' main antagonist, an evil, megalomaniac mad scientist and orphan whose many years of being bullied have warped his mind on destroying Lavender Castle, and thus plunging the whole universe into darkness and despair forever. Self-proclaiming himself "Destroyer of Planets and Terror of the Universe", he constantly travels in pursuit of the Paradox and its crew, aboard the Dark Station, his own gigantic, heavily armed space fortress crewed by unseen slaves imprisoned into the ship's bowels. Voiced by Jimmy Hibbert.
- Trump: Dr. Agon's pet and sidekick, a flying critter resembling a cross between a bat and a lizard with a trumpet-like face. Capable of talking, Trump also enjoys emitting sarcastic raspberry sounds now and then. He also seems to strongly dislike his own name, and is irritated when Agon calls him by it. Voiced by Jimmy Hibbert.
- Short Fred Ledd: A one-legged, dim-witted space pirate who roams galactic ether streams in his galleon-shaped craft, the Cutting Snark. He often uses a pair of crutches to move around, though being perfectly able to stand on his unique leg all the same. Mean, greedy and rancorous, he is bent on hijacking the Paradox and selling its crew as slaves, which occasionally drives him to work for Dr. Agon. Even though Agon holds him in undisguised contempt, he invites him to the Dark Station in Birds of a Feather. Voiced by Jimmy Hibbert.
- Tin Lizzy: Short Fred Ledd's mechanical parrot. She is shown to have the ability to remotely reprogram Sir Squeakalot in The Traitor, but is more commonly seen annoying Ledd by repeating everything that he says. She was named after the band Thin Lizzy, who Rodney Matthews designed album covers for. A 'tin lizzie' was also a nickname for a Ford Model T. Voiced by David Holt.
- Colonel Clump: An android created at the same factory which produced Sir Squeakalot. Although intended to serve his creators, a faulty master-switch caused him to become evil and escape. He takes over a space supermarket in The Collector, and uses it as a base from which to amass a collection of various lifeforms frozen in suspended animation. His one encounter with the Paradox crew ends with Sir Squeakalot (who knew about his faulty circuit) damaging his controls and dropping him down a waste disposal chute, though Birds of a Feather reveals that he recovered and still resides in the supermarket. Voiced by David Holt.
- The Guardian: A mysterious alien thief of obscure origin. He wears a metal helmet which obscures his face so that he will not hypnotise himself. In The Twilight Tower, he attempts to trap some of the Paradox crew in the eponymous tower, though is thwarted by Sir Squeakalot, resulting in the Tower's destruction. In Raiders of the Planet Zark, he attempts to trick the Paradox crew into retrieving the elusive Lavender Compass. It is implied that he has multiple lives, having survived the destruction of the Twilight Tower and also surviving being crushed by a huge block of stone. He is the only antagonist not present at Dr Agon's meeting in Birds of a Feather. Voiced by Rob Rackstraw.
- Mr Dank: This may not be his actual name because his race are called Danks. Sproggle calls him Big Froggle (probably as an insult) and Captain Thrice uses Mr Dank (probably as a courtesy). He has four arms, speaks with a stereotypical Deep South accent and lives in a large wooden house overlooking a swamp (the house is revealed to also be a spacecraft in Birds of a Feather). He has a long tongue resembling that of a frog or chameleon (he professes himself to be 'the fastest tongue in the West'). Vain and selfish, he subsists on Dank Juice, a drink made from the leaves of the Wumbo plant and apprehends any trespassers who might steal it. In Swamp Fever, he captures Lyca when she attempts to gather the leaves to heal Captain Thrice, though is outwitted by Sproggle. In Duelling Banjos, he loses a banjo-picking contest with Captain Thrice and with ill grace helps the Paradox crew to refuel their ship with Dank Juice. He attends Dr Agon's meeting in Birds of a Feather (where he is still not given a confirmed name). Voiced by Jimmy Hibbert.

=== Other characters ===
- The Twaddle Twins: A pair of alien traders, the two one-legged brothers are named Dim and Duff. They are identical in appearance, though wear different-shaped hats and different coloured neckties (Dim's being dark green and Duff's lilac). They are somewhat unscrupulous, being easily swayed by money, and often acquire their goods from dubious sources. They possess the powers of teleportation, which they often use to transport and steal things (including the Paradox's MD-646 engine in Double Cross). Despite their dubious morals, they usually prove to be allies of the Paradox crew. Voiced by Jimmy Hibbert (Twaddle Dim) and Rob Rackstraw (Twaddle Duff).
- Doodlebug: The owner of the space supermarket taken over by Colonel Clump. He is placed in suspended animation by Clump, though is rescued by Sir Squeakalot, Lyca and Roger. Whilst it is stated that he will recover from the experience, he presumably set up business elsewhere because Clump is still at the supermarket in Birds of a Feather. He is the only character not to have a voice.
- Wearizy: An invisible Terrian dog which is briefly owned by Sproggle in Wearizy. He comes from an invisible planet. He is capable of turning from a Terrian into a ferocious Doberoid, which Dr Agon learns to his detriment. Voiced by Rob Rackstraw.
- The President of Flora: A Floran who rules the planet Flora. He is not actually seen in the episode he appears in, which is Collision Course, due to the Paradox's TransVision being broken. Voiced by Jimmy Hibbert.
- The Nice Old Lady: A disguise often used by Dr. Agon to get the crew's attention. She is easily identifiable as one of Agon's disguises due to her purple clothing. Voiced by Kate Harbour.

== Planets ==
- Thestal: A barren desert planet, the location of the Twaddle Twins' business.
- Quagmire: A planet of swamps and bogs, populated by the Danks.
- Flora: Lyca's home planet. It is threatened by an asteroid in Collision Course.
- Zark: A seemingly uninhabited planet of dense forests and violent weather. It is the location of the Mountain of Morg where the Lavender Compass is hidden.
- Icester: A seemingly uninhabited planet of ice and snow. It is the location of the Icester Diamond, which Short Fred Ledd tries to steal.
- Brightonia on Sea: A tropical planet which is a popular holiday destination.
- The Dragon's Planet: A planet populated by giant carnivorous plants. The name may not be real, as it is revealed to be part of a trick by Dr Agon (with Dragon's Planet rendered as Dr Agon's Planet).
- Trimbo: A seemingly uninhabited desert planet, the location of a couple of twin peaks where the Paradox once ended up trapped.
- Bharron: A seemingly uninhabited desert planet, where Lavender Castle can be sighted once every thousand years when the two suns of the planet eclipse.
- Themea: A planet of jungles and mountains. It is the location of the Galactic Park, which is supposedly run by Twaddle Duff and only has one ride – a ghost train.
- Barrenette: A desert planet supposedly inhabited by aliens who were the victims of a massacre. However, it was revealed to be part of a trick by Dr. Agon.
- Australand: This planet is not actually seen in the series, but according to one of the special features on the DVD, it is Roger's home planet.
- Toma: This planet is not actually seen in the series, but according to the series bible, it is the location of the Laplon tree, which Captain Thrice's Walking Stick was carved from.

Many of the planets seen in the series are not named in-show, but the names are seen in the scripts and series bible.

== Machines and Vehicles ==
- The Paradox: A half-timbered, thatched cottage spaceship, home to Captain Thrice and his crew as they search the universe for Lavender Castle. What it lacks in gunnery, it makes up for in speed and agility. It is powered by an MD-646 engine, which in turn is operated by Isambard, who usually makes it work by whacking it with a wooden hammer.
- The Firefly: Roger's old Starfighter. As well as carrying passengers, it can also carry cargo. However, it meets its end at the hands of Dr. Agon, when it is destroyed by his Dark Station.
- The Dark Station: The most awesome destructive power in the universe. Captained by Dr. Agon, it has an inexhaustible supply of fuel thanks to its 1001 Unseen Slaves. It can even trigger the destruction of a sun with its lasers. There are times, however, when the Dark Station proves to be too big to reach its destination, which is when Dr. Agon uses...
- The Mammoth Machine: A versatile spacecraft resembling an elephant, and even makes an elephant's trumpet sound. It is powered by steam, and can travel on land, underwater and through outer space. Its weapons include missiles, lasers, a harpoon and Leech bolts.
- The Giant Mechanical Spider: A giant remote controlled robot belonging to Dr. Agon, shaped like a spider. Its known abilities include being able to weave a steel web, and crushing its prey with its pincers.
- The Cutting Snark: Short Fred Ledd's pirate galleon. It sails across ether streams that are scattered throughout space. Like The Dark Station, it has slaves working in the ship's depths – but unlike the Dark Station, the Cutting Snark's slaves are robots. Its only weapons are a pair of laser cannons, and the ship contains a rowboat that Ledd uses to get to planets that do not have ether streams.

== Episodes ==
=== Series 1 ===
No.	Title	Directed by	Written by	Original release date	Prod. code
1	"In the Beginning"	Chris Taylor	Written by : Gerry Anderson & Pauline Fisk; Story by : Pauline Fisk	7 January 1999	1
Captain Thrice embarks upon a mission to find the legendary Lavender Castle, the greatest source of power in the universe, before the evil Dr. Agon can destroy it. In search of a crew for the starship Paradox, he sets out to rescue the prisoners of the wicked space pirate Short Fred Ledd, but finds the pirate in league with Dr. Agon.
2	"Flower Power"	Chris Taylor	Written by : Gerry Anderson & Pauline Fisk; Story by : Pauline Fisk	14 January 1999	2
The new crew of the Paradox intercept an Intergalactic Distress Call and trace it to the Dragon's Planet where they find a dying old lady in a dilapidated house inside a huge plant pod. She asks them to grant her dying wish, but Captain Thrice discovers a plot laid by Dr. Agon to trap them all inside the pod!
3	"The Twilight Tower"	Chris Taylor	Written by : Gerry Anderson & Pauline Fisk; Story by : Pauline Fisk	21 January 1999	3
The Paradox is drawn to a dark tower perched on a cliff top and, believing it might prove to be a gateway to Lavender Castle, Captain Thrice, Roger and Isambard investigate. Inside, they are welcomed by The Guardian who invites them to view the Most Fabulous Object in the Universe.
4	"High Moon"	Chris Taylor	Gerry Anderson & Pauline Fisk	28 January 1999	4
Attempting to outrun Dr. Agon's Mammoth Machine, Isambard pushes the Paradox's engines beyond their capacity and they explode. Without power, the crew are sitting ducks for Dr. Agon who promises a poetic end for the travellers – vapourisation when the moon of the planet Draco reaches its zenith.
5	"The Lost Starfighter"	Chris Taylor	Written by : Chris Trengove & Gerry Anderson; Story by : Chris Bowden	4 February 1999	5
By a trillion to one chance, the Paradox discovers Roger's old Starfighter, the Firefly, adrift in space. Isambard goes aboard to effect repairs, but it is the inexperienced Sproggle who ends up in the cockpit of the Starfighter when Dr. Agon's Mammoth Machine closes in on the Paradox!
6	"The Black Swat"	Chris Taylor	Pauline Fisk	11 February 1999	10
While Lyca and Sproggle search for treasure on planet Scull, the Paradox comes under fire from Short Fred Ledd who destroys the ship and takes the crew prisoner aboard the Cutting Snark, guarded by the fearsome robot spider known as The Black Swat. It is now up to Lyca, Sproggle and Walking Stick to rescue their friends.
7	"Double Cross"	Chris Taylor	Written by : Gerry Anderson & Pauline Fisk; Story by : Gerry Anderson	18 February 1999	7
Captain Thrice is contacted by junkyard owner Twaddle Duff who tells of a customer who is willing to swap information about Lavender Castle for the Paradox's rare MD646 engine. Isambard refuses to allow his engine to be taken away, but discovers that he has not much choice in the matter – the engine has already gone!
8	"A Stitch in Time"	Chris Taylor	Written by : Gerry Anderson; Story by : Chris Bowden	25 February 1999	6
Dr. Agon traps the crew of the Paradox in an asteroid field and tragedy strikes when Captain Thrice is killed in Agon's first attack. With the Paradox on the verge of destruction, Lyca takes a desperate gamble and activates Isambard's new experimental time machine.
9	"Bird of Prey"	Chris Taylor	Chris Trengove	4 March 1999	8
Tailing the Paradox, Dr. Agon's falcon, Trump, is sucked into a black hole and grows to gigantic size. The giant falcon attacks the Paradox, but accidentally swallows the half-timbered starship and Captain Thrice and his crew find themselves trapped in the giant bird's belly!
10	"Collision Course"	Chris Taylor	Written by : Chris Trengove & Gerry Anderson; Story by : Chris Trengrove	11 March 1999	9
The Paradox receives a distress call revealing that a huge asteroid is on a collision course with Lyca's home planet Flora – if it is not stopped within seven hours, the entire population will perish. The Paradox crew mount a daring rescue mission with the help of the junkyard twins Twaddle Duff and Twaddle Dim.
11	"Swamp Fever"	Chris Taylor	Chris Trengove	18 March 1999	12
Captain Thrice contracts Galactic Fever and without treatment, he could die within five days. The cure is an extract from the leaves of the Wumbo plant, found only in the Great Swamp on the planet Quagmire. But the Wumbo plants are fiercely guarded by the Danks, who want them all for themselves.
12	"Raiders of the Planet Zark"	Chris Taylor	Written by : Chris Trengove; Story by : Chris Bowden	25 March 1999	11
A message on Sproggle's radio draws the Paradox crew to the Mountain of Morg on the planet Zark to search for the Lavender Compass that will lead them to Lavender Castle. But the caves of Morg are laced with deadly traps and the travellers' every move is being watched by a sinister figure who wants the Compass for himself.
13	"The Galacternet"	Chris Taylor	Gerry Anderson	1 April 1999	13
Isambard discovers that Lavender Castle has its own web site on the Galacternet with co-ordinates that apparently reveal its position. Captain Thrice suspects a trap laid by Dr. Agon, but the crew vote to follow the co-ordinates to the twin peaks on the planet Trimbo where the Paradox is caught in a gigantic spider's web!
14	"Brightonia on Sea"	Chris Taylor	Gerry Anderson	8 April 1999	14
Following a recommendation in a brochure, the Paradox crew decide to take a holiday on the planet Brightonia on Sea. But once there, they are captured by Short Fred Ledd who chains them up and steals the Paradox. Without water, their only hope of survival rests with Sir Squeakalot and Isambard's latest invention, a remote control for the Paradox.
15	"Traitor"	Chris Taylor	Written by : Gerry Anderson; Story by : Rodney Matthews	15 April 1999	15
Sir Squeakalot undergoes a personality change when he is taken over by Short Fred Ledd's parrot, Tin Lizzy. He ties up the Paradox crew and flies the ship to the Cutting Snark, where even the force of Lavender Castle seems powerless to prevent them from becoming the slaves of Dr. Agon!
16	"The Collector"	Chris Taylor	Chris Trengove	22 April 1999	16
Arriving at Doodlebug's Supermarket to collect supplies, Roger, Lyca and Sir Squeakalot find that the place has been ransacked and Doodlebug placed in suspended animation. The culprit is the android Colonel Clump, who wants to turn the Paradox crew into exhibits in his gallery of living space creatures.
17	"Lost in Space"	Chris Taylor	Gerry Anderson	29 April 1999	17
Dr. Agon tricks the Twaddle twins into delivering the Firefly to Captain Thrice as an anonymous gift. When Roger test flies the Firefly, it suddenly goes out of control, breaking through the light barrier. The Firefly finally comes to a stop, but Roger finds himself on the other side of the galaxy with no way back!
18	"Duelling Banjos"	Chris Taylor	Chris Trengove	6 January 2000	18
Out of fuel, the Paradox crash lands in the swamp on planet Quagmire, close to the Dank's shack. The suspicious Dank refuses to help the stranded crew until Captain Thrice challenges him to a banjo picking contest. If Thrice wins, the Dank will help, but if he loses, the Paradox will belong to the Dank.
19	"The Legend"	Chris Taylor	Gerry Anderson	13 January 2000	19
According to legend, when the two suns eclipse on planet Bharron, once every thousand years, Lavender Castle can be seen in the desert. Captain Thrice and Walking Stick mount an expedition into the desert, but on the third day, the Captain loses Walking Stick when he falls into a gully. Alone in an endless desert, Thrice finds himself at the mercy of Dr. Agon.
20	"Cloud of Chaos"	Chris Taylor	Written by : Chris Trengove; Story by : Chris Taylor	20 January 2000	20
During a close encounter with Dr. Agon's Mammoth Machine, Sproggle is accidentally thrown from the Paradox and falls into a strange blue cloud. He is "rescued" by Dr. Agon, but once aboard the Mammoth Machine, both are oddly effected by the cloud and swap personalities: Dr. Agon becomes the frightened orphan child while Sproggle turns into Dr. Agon.
21	"Diamonds Aren't Forever"	Chris Taylor	Gerry Anderson	27 January 2000	21
Tailing Short Fred Ledd to the planet Icesester, Sproggle is captured by the pirate who holds him hostage. Fred is after the Icesester Diamond, the largest diamond in the universe with the power to absorb the energy of a sun. If the Paradox crew do not find the diamond for him within thirty minutes, Fred will cut off Sproggle's bauble.
22	"Galactic Park"	Chris Taylor	Written by : Gerry Anderson; Story by : Craig Hemmings	3 February 2000	22
Suffering from Space Fatigue and in need of a break, the Paradox crew visit a Galactic Park on the planet Themea, apparently run by Twaddle Duff. The crew decide to take a ride on Twaddle Duff's ghost train, unaware that the train is actually under the control of Dr. Agon, who plans to give them the ride of their lives!
23	"Wearizy"	Chris Taylor	Gerry Anderson	10 February 2000	23
Captain Thrice and Sproggle visit the Twaddle twins on planet Thestal to find Sproggle a birthday present. Sproggle wants a dog, but the Captain refuses to allow one on board the Paradox, so the Twaddle twins get Sproggle an invisible dog called Wearizy. Then, an unexpected guest gate-crashes Sproggle's birthday party – Dr. Agon!
24	"Supernova"	Chris Taylor	Gerry Anderson	17 February 2000	24
The Paradox finally finds Lavender Castle, but so does Dr. Agon, who sets a plan in motion to destroy it: when the Castle is in close range of a sun, Agon intends to create a chain reaction in the sun which will destroy itself, vaporising Lavender Castle. The Paradox crew race to stop Dr. Agon from carrying out his plan, but they may already be too late.
25	"Interface"	Chris Taylor	Written by : Gerry Anderson; Story by : Craig Hemmings	2 March 2000	25
Answering a distress call, the Paradox crew arrive on the planet Barrenette where the desert is littered with bodies. But the bodies are just painted cut-outs and the team have walked into another of Dr. Agon's devious traps. With the rest of the crew knocked out by sleeping gas, Sir Squeakalot must again face Dr. Agon's giant robot spider – but this time, alone.
26	"Birds of a Feather…"	Chris Taylor	Written by : Gerry Anderson; Story by : Rodney Matthews	9 March 2000	26
Dr. Agon proposes an alliance of the Paradox crew's greatest enemies and summons Short Fred Ledd, the Dank and Colonel Clump to the Dark Station. Each has a story to tell of an encounter with the Paradox crew that has left them with a score to settle.

=== Cancelled Series 2 ===
A second season was planned in advance of the broadcast of the first series, and had already been commissioned by CITV. 26 scripts had been written by Gerry Anderson, Pauline Fisk, Chris Trengove, Jimmy Hibbert and Marco Palmer. For this 2nd season, the CGI sequences would have been animated by Nelvana in Canada. It also would have been likely to introduce new characters alongside the regular cast. However, Carrington Productions International, the financiers of the show, were absorbed into Entertainment Rights (now DreamWorks Classics) in 2000, and although their successors made several attempts to get the 2nd season off the ground, the plans would ultimately be dropped the following year.

== Credits ==
- From an Original Concept by Rodney Matthews
- Produced at Cosgrove Hall Films Limited
- Produced by: Gerry Anderson
- Executive Producer: Craig Hemmings
- For Cosgrove Hall: Brian Cosgrove
- Directed by: Chris Taylor
- Designed by: Rodney Matthews
- Line Producer: Chris Bowden
- Scripts by: Gerry Anderson, Chris Trengove, Pauline Fisk
- Stories by: Gerry Anderson, Rodney Matthews, Craig Hemmings, Chris Trengove, Pauline Fisk
- Music Composed by: Crispin Merrell
- Dialogue Recording Services Provided by: AlfaSound, AngelSound, The Bridge
- Puppets Built at: Mackinnon & Saunders
- Supervising Animator: Sue Pugh
- Animation by: Tim Collings, Matt Palmer, Lisa Goddard, Justin Exley, Stuart Sutcliffe, Monica McCartney, Tobias Fouracre, Phil Dale, Barry Purves, Bill Martin, Haydn Secker, Lucy Gell, David Grove, Andy Joule, Mike Cottee
- Sets by: Jeff Spain, Richard Sykes, Rick Kent, Paul Jones, Samantha Hanks, Nick Wilson
- Props by: Owen Ballhatchet, Jon Fletcher, Alison Davies
- Costumes by: Clare Elliott, Geraldine Corrigan, Karen Betty, Barbara Biddulph
- Visual FX by: Stephen Weston
- Visual FX Assistant: Manfred-Dean Yurke
- Art Direction by: Peter Hillier
- Lighting Camera: Joe Dembinski, Tim Harper
- Edited by: Zyggy Markiewicz
- Off-line Editing: Flix Facilities
- Production Manager: Laura Duncalf
- Production Controller: Phil Slattery
- Production Co-ordinator: Mary Anderson
- Production Assistant: Debbie Peers
- Audio Post Production Services Provided by: Hullabaloo Studios
- On-line Editing Facilities: 4:2:2 Manchester
