= Christopher Wormell =

English printmaker and children's book illustrator

Christopher Wormell (born 1955) is an English printmaker, principally known for his illustrated books.

== Biography ==
He was born in 1955 in Gainsborough, Lincolnshire. He had no formal training as an artist, working as a road-sweeper, rubbish collector, postman, and a factory worker. An interest in landscape painting led him to buy a set of wood engraving tools in 1982, and to teach himself how to use them. His first commercial book, An Alphabet of Animals, published in 1990 won that year's Graphics Prize at the Bologna International Children's Book Fair. He was the recipient of the 2004 New York Times Book Review Best Illustrated Children's Book Award for Teeth, Tails, and Tentacles.

He has published some 14 illustrated books and acted as illustrator of others' work on at least 18 more. His work has also been published as greeting cards and he designed the artwork for a series of advertisements for Adnams, a regional brewer based in Suffolk.

On 6 April 2016, Aston Villa Football Club unveiled a newly designed club badge, featuring a heraldic lion designed by Wormell.

He lives in London with his wife and three children.

== Lino Artwork ==
He also makes many pieces of lino artwork. He has made and printed many different types of lino pieces varying in detail and size. They can be seen on his website.

== Bibliography ==
=== As author and illustrator ===
- An Alphabet of Animals (1990)
- A Number of Animals (1993)
- Kitchen Wisdom (1995)
- What I Eat (1996)
- Where I Live (1996)
- The Art of the Kitchen (1998)
- Blue Rabbit and Friends (1999)
- Blue Rabbit and the Runaway Wheel (1999)
- The Animal Train (2000)
- Off to the Fair (2001)
- Puff-Puff, Chugga-Chugga (2001)
- George and the Dragon (2002)
- The New Alphabet of Animals (2002)
- In the Woods (2003)
- Two Frogs (2003)
- The Big Ugly Monster and the Little Stone Rabbit (2004)
- Teeth, Tails, and Tentacles (2004)
- Mice, Morals, and Monkey Business (2005)
- The Sea Monster (2005)
- The Wild Girl (2005)
- Henry and the Fox (2006)
- Through the Animals' Eyes (2006)
- George, the Dragon and the Princess (2007)
- The Saddest King (2007)
- Wings, Horns, and Claws (2007)
- Molly and the Night Monster (2008)
- The Animals Came Two By Two (2008)
- Ferocious Wild Beasts (2009)
- One Smart Fish (2010)

=== As illustrator only ===
- The Story of a Norfolk Farm (1986)
- English Country Traditions (1988)
- Mowgli's Brothers (1992)
- The Cook's Journal (1994)
- Mediterranean Flavours: Savouring the Sun (1995)
- The Gardener's Journal (1997)
- Wines of the Rhone Valley (1997)
- Bordeaux: A Comprehensive Guide (1998)
- Ahab's Wife (1999)
- Field Green (2003)
- Pinewoods of the Black Mount (2003)
- Swan Song (2003)
- Island Home (2015)
- The Book of Dust: La Belle Sauvage (2017)
- Erebus (2018)
- The Book of Dust: The Secret Commonwealth (2019)
- The Book of Dust: The Rose Field (2025)
