= Lizzie Zipmouth =

2000 novel by Jacqueline Wilson

- First edition cover
- Author: Jacqueline Wilson
- Illustrator: Nick Sharratt
- Language: English
- Genre: Junior fiction
- Publisher: Young Corgi
- Publication date: 2000
- Publication place: United Kingdom
- Media type: Print
- Pages: 80 pp
- ISBN: 0-552-54653-4

Lizzie Zipmouth is a 2000 children's novel by author Jacqueline Wilson. It follows a young girl named Lizzie who copes with moving into a new home.

== Plot ==
Lizzie Zipmouth is about a young girl named Lizzie who moves into a new home with her mother after her once-single mother finds a new boyfriend, Sam. Disgruntled and unhappy about the way these proceedings are going, she doesn't try to make friends with Sam's two sons, Rory and Jake, and keeps to herself by not saying a word. Soon, Jake nicknames her 'Lizzie Zipmouth' because of her obvious silence to everyone. It is only when she meets her scary step-great-grandmother that she begins to find a connection with her new family, bonding with Great-Gran over their love of dolls. However, Great-Gran has a bad stroke, and the family is unsure of the outcome. Lizzie, using Great-Gran's phrases and back-chats, manages to snap Great-Gran out of her ill trance. Soon, Great-Gran is making a full recovery and Lizzie is not so zipmouthed anymore.

== Reception ==
AudioFile called the story "charming" while noting it "may cause difficulties with readers unused to British idioms".

The audiobook, narrated by Sophie Aldred, received reviews from Booklist and AudioFile, who praised Aldred's "capable and clear narration".
