= 2003 in the United Kingdom =

Events from the year 2003 in the United Kingdom.

== Incumbents ==
- Monarch – Elizabeth II
- Prime Minister – Tony Blair (Labour)

== Events ==
=== January ===
- January – Toyota launches an all-new Avensis to be built at TMUK.
- 10 January – Ian Carr, a 27-year-old banned from driving with a total of 89 previous convictions (including causing death by dangerous driving), admits causing the death by dangerous driving of a six-year-old girl in Ashington, Northumberland – a crime which sparks widespread public and media outrage across the United Kingdom.
- 14 January – Anti-terrorism detective Stephen Oake is murdered in Crumpsall, Manchester by Islamic terrorist Kamel Bourgass after being stabbed eight times while attempting his arrest.
- 25 January – Central line underground train crashes into the tunnel wall at Chancery Lane tube station in London, injuring 34 people.
- 29 January – Sally Clark, a 38-year-old former solicitor from Cheshire, is released from prison after the Court of Appeal clears her of murdering her two sons, who are believed to have suffered sudden infant death syndrome.
- 30 January – Richard Colvin Reid, the so-called "shoe bomber", is sentenced to life imprisonment by a United States court.
- 31 January – One of the longest prison sentences ever issued in a British court for a motoring offence is given to killer driver Ian Carr, who receives a nine-and-a-half-year sentence for causing death by dangerous driving – his second conviction for the crime in twelve years.

=== February ===
- 1 February – In Northern Ireland, the Protestant Ulster Defence Association Belfast leader John Gregg is killed by a loyalist faction.
- 15 February – In London, more than 2,000,000 people demonstrate against the Iraq War, the largest demonstration in UK history.
- 17 February – The London congestion charge, a fee levied on motorists travelling within designated parts of central London, comes into operation.
- 27 February
  - 122 Labour MPs vote against the government in a debate over the Iraq War.
  - Rowan Williams enthroned as Archbishop of Canterbury.

=== March ===
- 12 March – Iraq disarmament crisis: UK Prime Minister Tony Blair proposes an amendment to the possible 18th U.N. resolution, which would call for Iraq to meet certain benchmarks to prove that it was disarming. The amendment is immediately rejected by France, who promises to veto any new resolution.
- 15 March – Comic actress Dame Thora Hird dies in a nursing home in London, aged 91, less than a year after her final appearance on BBC Radio.
- 18 March – Parliament votes to approve an invasion of Iraq.
- 20 March – 2003 Iraq war: Land troops from United Kingdom join troops from the United States, Australia and Poland in the invasion of Iraq.
- 22 March – Tomahawk cruise missiles fired from Royal Navy submarines take part in a massive air and missile strike on military targets in Baghdad.
- End – First arrest of a British-based terrorist group linked to Al-Qaeda, in Operation CREVICE.

=== April ===
- 6 April – British forces capture the city of Basra during the invasion of Iraq.
- 8 April – Three men are convicted in relation to a Real IRA campaign that saw bombs explode in London and Birmingham in 2001. Two others have already admitted plotting to cause explosions as part of the same campaign.
- 9 April – Invasion of Iraq: the Battle of Baghdad, fought with British air support, concludes, ending Saddam Hussein's rule in the country after 24 years in power.
- 21 April – Robert Wardle is appointed Director of the Serious Fraud Office of England and Wales.
- 29 April – Tony Blair holds a one-day summit with Russian President Vladimir Putin. Putin mocks the United Kingdom and America's failure to locate weapons of mass destruction in Iraq.

=== May ===
- 3 May
  - 2003 Scottish Parliament election: the Labour and Liberal Democrat coalition led by Jack McConnell win a majority of the seats and remain in power. The Scottish Green Party and the Scottish Socialist Party significantly increase their representation.
  - 2003 National Assembly for Wales election: the Labour Party remain in power.
  - The BBC announces that the hugely popular character Den Watts will return to its soap opera EastEnders later this year, fourteen years after he was supposedly killed off.
- 15 May – The government suspends all flights to and from Kenya after warnings of an imminent al-Qaeda attack.
- 28 May – The UEFA Champions League Final at Old Trafford (home to Manchester United) with AC Milan beating Juventus in a penalty shootout following a goalless draw.
- 29 May – Journalist Andrew Gilligan broadcasts a report on the BBC Radio 4 Today programme stating that the government claimed in its 2002 dossier that Iraq could deploy weapons of mass destruction within forty-five minutes knowing the claim to be dubious. A political storm ensues. Gilligan has interviewed weapons expert David Kelly.

=== June ===
- 14 June
  - First Minister for Children appointed, Margaret Hodge.
  - The first official Twenty20 cricket matches are played between the English counties in the Twenty20 Cup.
- 15 June – The News of the World publishes an article in which Ian Huntley is photographed in his cell at Woodhill Prison. An undercover reporter had got a job in the prison and was employed as Huntley's guard.
- 21 June – The novel Harry Potter and the Order of the Phoenix is released to the public.
- 24 June
  - President Vladimir Putin becomes the first Russian head of state to make a state visit to the United Kingdom since Tsar Alexander II in 1874.
  - Six members of the Royal Military Police are killed, and eight other soldiers are injured, in Iraq.
- 26 June
  - The latest MORI poll puts Labour and Conservative parties on even terms at 35%.
  - Businessman Sir Denis Thatcher, husband of former Prime Minister Margaret Thatcher, dies aged 88 at the Lister Hospital in London.

=== July ===
- 2 July – Chelsea F.C. are bought by Russian billionaire Roman Abramovich for a sum of £150,000,000 from current chairman Ken Bates, twenty-one years after he bought the club for £1.
- 15 July – David Kelly appears before the House of Commons Foreign Affairs Select Committee, to answer questions over the information he had given to Andrew Gilligan.
- 18 July – David Kelly is found dead near his home in Oxfordshire – police suspect that he committed suicide.
- 20 July – The BBC confirms that Dr. David Kelly, found dead from a suspected suicide two days earlier, was the main source for a controversial report that sparked a deep rift with the government.
- 27 July – The British-born American actor and comedian Bob Hope dies at his home in California, two months after his hundredth birthday.
- 30 July
  - Eurostar train number 3313/14 sets a new speed record at 334.7 km/h (208 mph) on the Channel Tunnel Rail Link.
  - Motorcyclist Steve Hislop, 41, is killed in a helicopter crash near Teviothead in the Scottish Borders.

=== August ===
- 1 August – The Hutton Inquiry into the recent death of weapons expert Dr. David Kelly, chaired by judge Lord Hutton, opens, beginning to take evidence on 11 August.
- 3 August – Police use the taser for the first time.
- 10 August – Brogdale, near Faversham, enters the UK Weather Records for the highest ever recorded temperature of 38.5 °C, a record which holds until July 2019. The 2003 European heat wave makes this the United Kingdom's hottest summer for thirteen years.

=== September ===
- 3 September – Britain's last surviving Army officer of World War I, Norman Porteous, dies in Edinburgh at the age of 104.
- 4 September – The rebuilt Bull Ring shopping centre in Birmingham is officially opened by Sir Albert Bore.
- 18 September – Brent East by-election: Sarah Teather of the Liberal Democrats becomes MP for Brent East after twenty-nine years of Labour control.
- 29 September
  - Section 1 of the Channel Tunnel Rail Link, later High Speed 1, from Fawkham Junction to the Channel Tunnel is opened for passengers.
  - The comeback of Den Watts (played by Leslie Grantham) in EastEnders is screened, fourteen years after the character was supposedly killed off, and just over four months after the BBC confirmed that Grantham would be returning to the series.

=== October ===
- 24 October – Supersonic aircraft Concorde makes its final commercial flights after twenty-seven years.
- 29 October – Iain Duncan Smith resigns after serving two years as Leader of the Conservative Party.

=== November ===
- 4 November – Channel 4's soap opera Brookside, on air since the station was launched in 1982, ends after 21 years.
- 6 November – 2003 Conservative Party leadership election: Michael Howard is elected unopposed as Leader of the Conservative Party, a post he will hold for two years.
- 8 November – Sophie, Countess of Wessex gives birth to her and Prince Edward's first child, a baby girl.
- 16 November – David Davis, the new Shadow Home Secretary, calls for a return of the death penalty for murderers found guilty of the most horrific murders; citing Moors murderer Ian Brady and Yorkshire Ripper Peter Sutcliffe as criminals whose crimes would meet the criteria.
- 18 November
  - United States President George W. Bush makes a state visit to London in the midst of massive protests.
  - Passage of the Local Government Act 2003 including the repeal in England, Northern Ireland and Wales of controversial Section 28 of the Local Government Act 1988 which prevented local authorities from "promoting homosexuality". Section 28 had already been repealed in Scotland since 2000.
- 20 November
  - Several bombs explode in Istanbul, Turkey at several British targets. The Turkish head office of HSBC and the British consulate are destroyed and the British Consul-General, Roger Short is killed.
  - Criminal Justice Act 2003 passed, permitting waiver of the rule against double jeopardy in certain serious cases and removing the privilege of peerage to be excused from jury service.
  - Sexual Offences Act 2003 passed, superseding the Act of 1956 with more specific and explicit wording, also creating several new offences.
- 22 November – England are rugby world champions after defeating Australia 20–17 after extra time.
- 24 November – The High Court in Glasgow imposes a minimum sentence of 27 years for Al Ali Mohmed Al Megrahi, the Libyan convicted of bombing Pan Am Flight 103 over Lockerbie, Scotland.
- 25 November – Serial killer Anthony Hardy, of Camden, is jailed for life at the Old Bailey for murdering three women. The dismembered remains of two victims were found in a pub bin in December 2002.
- 26 November – The final Concorde flight touches down in Filton, Bristol where it is welcomed by the Duke of York.

=== December ===
- 9 December – The M6 Toll motorway opens, giving the United Kingdom its first toll motorway and providing a northern by-pass for the congested section of the M6 motorway through the West Midlands conurbation.
- 10 December
  - Clive Granger wins the Nobel Prize in Economics jointly with Robert F. Engle "for methods of analysing economic time series with common trends (cointegration)".
  - Anthony J. Leggett wins the Nobel Prize in Physics jointly with Alexei Alexeyevich Abrikosov and Vitaly Ginzburg "for pioneering contributions to the theory of superconductors and superfluids".
  - Peter Mansfield wins the Nobel Prize in Physiology or Medicine jointly with Paul Lauterbur "for their discoveries concerning magnetic resonance imaging".
  - The Court of Appeal overturns two murder convictions against 40-year-old Wiltshire woman Angela Cannings, who was wrongly convicted of murdering her two baby sons in April last year. Mrs. Cannings, who has a surviving daughter, always maintained that her sons were both victims of sudden infant death syndrome.
  - The official inflation target measure is changed to the Consumer Price Index figure from RPIX.
- 12 December – Mick Jagger of The Rolling Stones receives a knighthood from the Prince of Wales (now Charles III).
- 16 December – The Government announces plans to build a new runway at Stansted Airport in Essex and a short-haul runway at Heathrow Airport sparking anger from environmentalist groups.
- 17 December – Ian Huntley is found guilty of the Soham Murders and sentenced to life imprisonment at the Old Bailey. A High Court judge will later decide on the minimum number of the years that he will have to serve before being considered for parole. His ex-girlfriend Maxine Carr is found guilty of perverting the course of justice and receives a jail term of three-and-a-half years, but she will be freed on licence (under a new identity to protect her from reprisal attacks) in May 2004 as she has already served sixteen months on remand. Home Secretary David Blunkett orders an inquiry into how the police vetting system failed to prevent Huntley from getting a job in a school after it is revealed at the end of his trial that he had been suspected in the past of crimes including underage sex, rape, indecent assault and burglary.
- 29 December – Celebrity television presenter and comedian Bob Monkhouse dies of cancer at his home in Eggington, Bedfordshire, aged 75.

=== Undated ===
- 153,065 divorces this year.
- Sales of the DVD home video format take the largest share of the UK home video market for the first time. The format, first launched in the UK in June 1998, accounts for more than 70% of home video sales this year as the VHS format's popularity falls and many new titles are not being released on it.
- New car sales reach a record high this year of nearly 2,600,000, with the Ford Focus enjoying its fifth successive year as the United Kingdom's best-selling new car. BMW sales also reach a record high, with the BMW 3 Series managing well over 60,000 sales as the UK's ninth best-selling car. Sales of Vauxhall, Peugeot, Renault and Volkswagen cars remain strong as well, while Nissan also enjoys an increase in sales largely due to the popularity of its new version of the Micra.

== Publications ==
- Iain Banks' book Raw Spirit.
- Mark Haddon's novel The Curious Incident of the Dog in the Night-Time.
- Adrian Praetzellis' Death by Theory: A Tale of Mystery and Archaeological Theory, first in the Hannah Green book series.
- Terry Pratchett's Discworld novels The Wee Free Men and Monstrous Regiment.
- J. K. Rowling's novel Harry Potter and the Order of the Phoenix.
- Lynne Truss's punctuation guide Eats, Shoots & Leaves.
- Charlotte Voake's picture book Ginger Finds a Home.

== Births ==
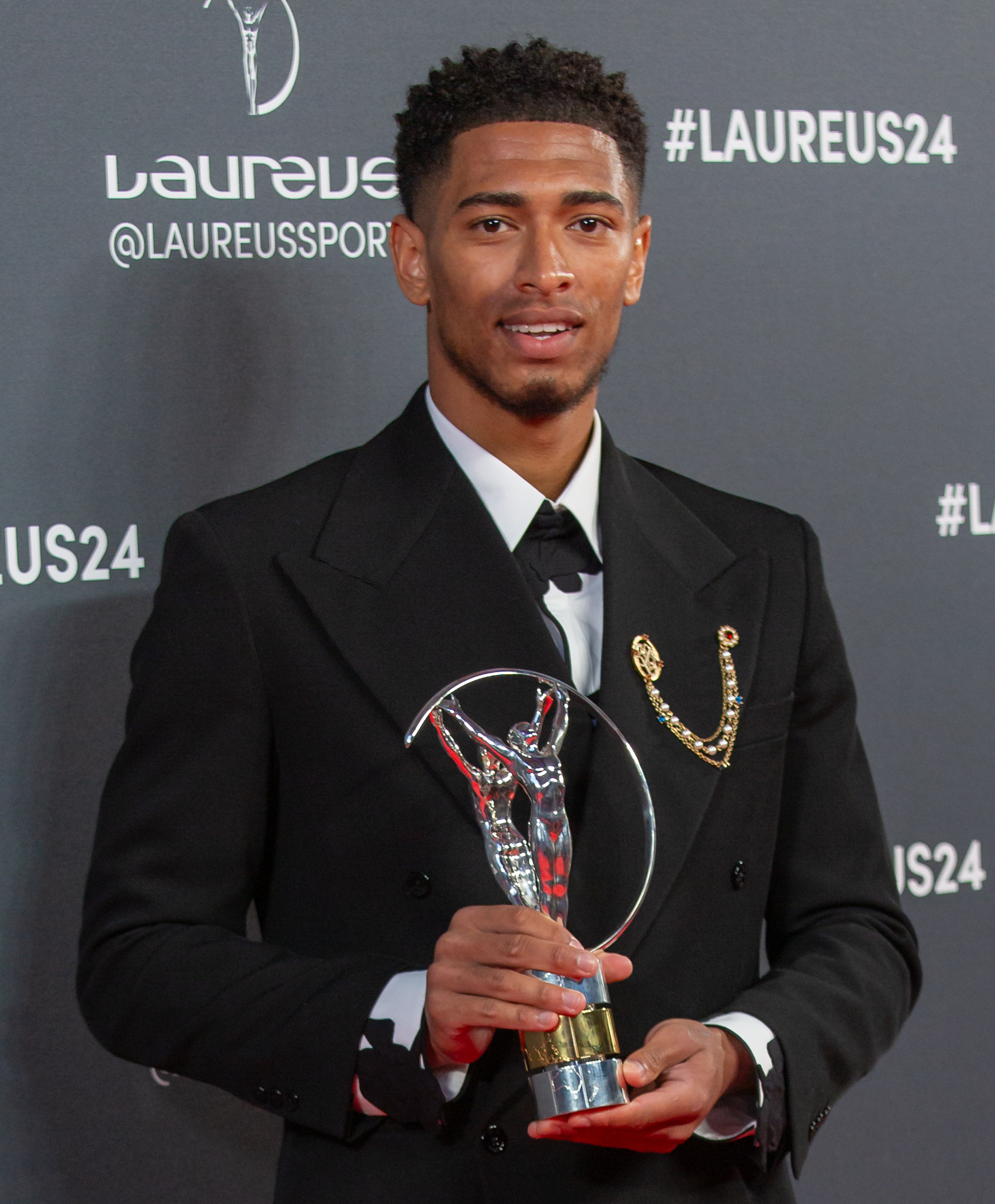
Jude Bellingham

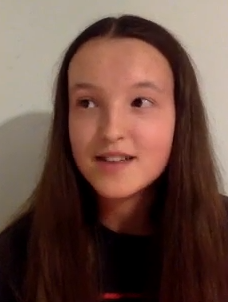
Bella Ramsey

- 26 February – Levi Colwill, footballer
- 2 March – Eloise Taylor, second daughter of Lady Helen Taylor and Timothy Taylor
- 24 March – Mae Stephens, singer
- 30 March – Lara Wollington, actress
- 4 April – Harvey Elliott, footballer
- 18 April – Sophia Grace, media personality
- 30 April – Emily Carey, actor
- 12 May – Madeleine McCann, abductee
- 14 June – Yasha Asley, mathematical prodigy
- 29 June – Jude Bellingham, footballer
- 9 July – Conor Bradley, footballer
- 18 July – Lucy Hutchinson, actress
- 25 September
  - Alexander Aze, actor
  - Bella Ramsey, actress
- 3 October – Callum Doyle, footballer
- 13 October – Shoaib Bashir, cricketer
- 20 October – Carney Chukwuemeka, footballer
- 8 November – Lady Louise Windsor, daughter of Prince Edward and Sophie (then Earl and Countess of Wessex; now Duke and Duchess of Edinburgh)
- 9 December – Chris Sze, Malaysian footballer

== Deaths ==
=== January ===
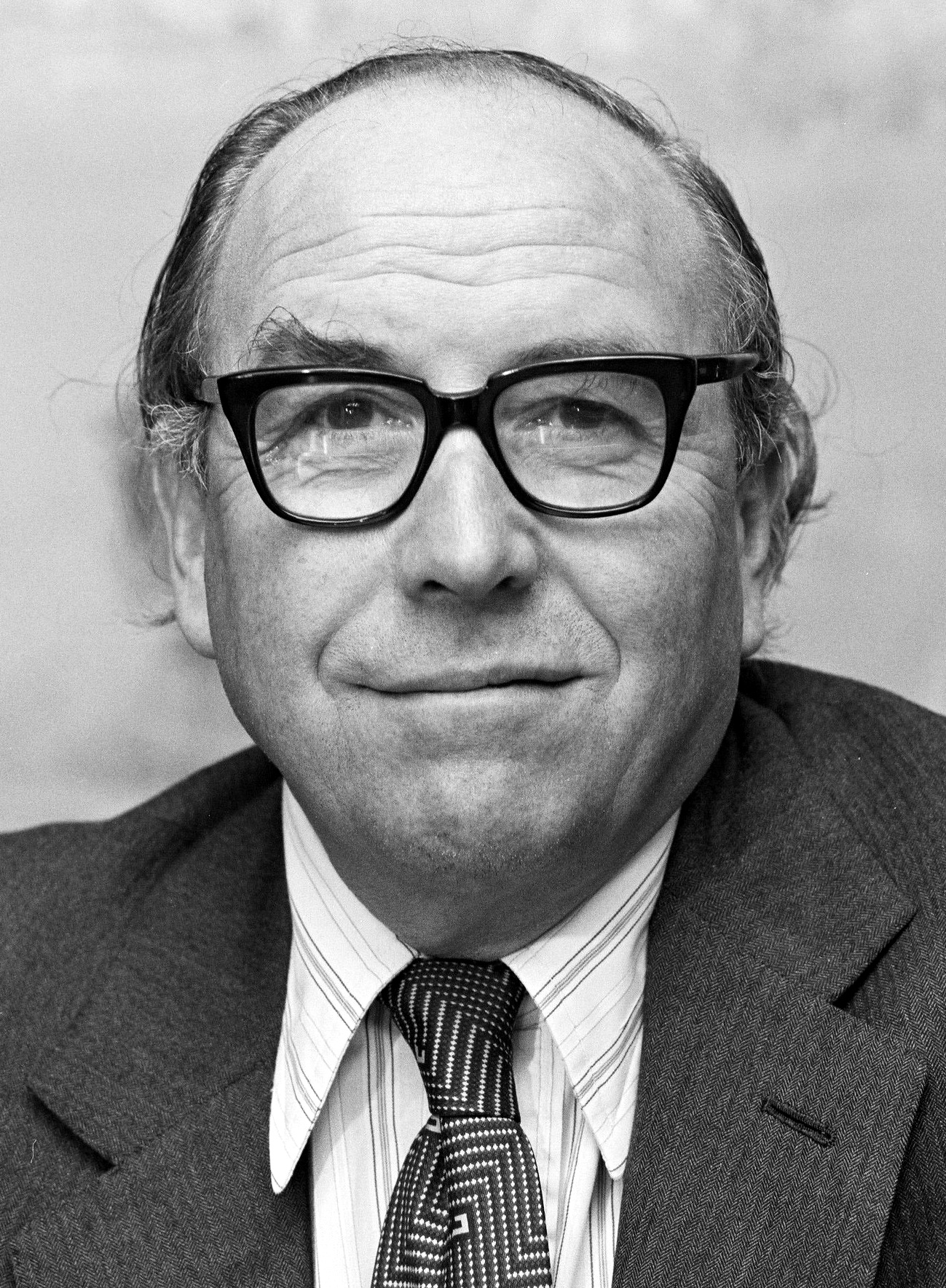
Roy Jenkins

- 1 January – Cyril Shaps, actor (born 1923)
- 2 January – Bill Shelton, Conservative politician (born 1929)
- 4 January – Yfrah Neaman, Lebanese-born violinist (born 1923)
- 5 January
  - Roy Jenkins, Labour government minister, later founder member and the first leader of the former Social Democratic Party (born 1920)
  - Daphne Oram, composer and musician (born 1925)
- 6 January
  - Glyn Davies, Welsh economist (born 1919)
  - Sir Philip Ward, Army major-general (born 1924)
- 8 January – Ron Goodwin, composer (born 1925)
- 9 January
  - Elizabeth Irving, actress and founder of Keep Britain Tidy (born 1904)
  - Peter Tinniswood, scriptwriter (born 1936)
- 11 January – Anthony Havelock-Allan, film producer (born 1904)
- 12 January
  - Maurice Gibb, musician and singer-songwriter (born 1949); died in the United States of America
  - Alan Nunn May, physicist and Soviet spy (born 1911)
- 13 January – Elisabeth Croft, actress (born 1907)
- 14 January
  - Monica Furlong, author and journalist (born 1930)
  - Stephen Oake, police officer of Greater Manchester Police (murdered on duty) (born 1962)
- 16 January – Chris Mead, ornithologist (born 1940)
- 18 January – Gavin Lyall, novelist (born 1932)
- 20 January – David Battley, actor (born 1935)
- 22 January – Peter Russell, poet (born 1921); died in Italy
- 26 January
  - Hugh Trevor-Roper, Baron Dacre of Glanton, historian (born 1914)
  - George Younger, 4th Viscount Younger of Leckie, politician (born 1931)

=== February ===
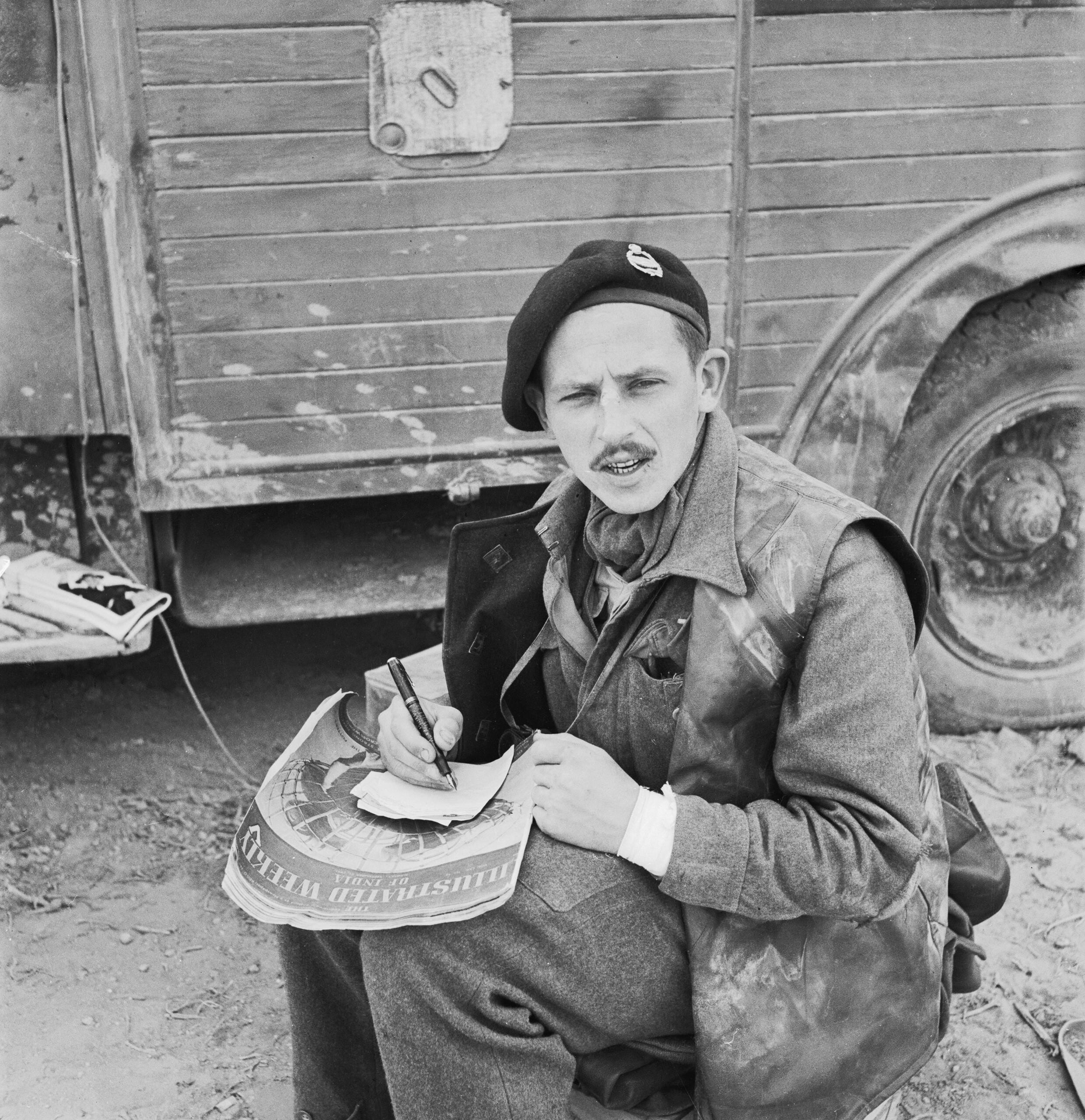
Philip John Gardner

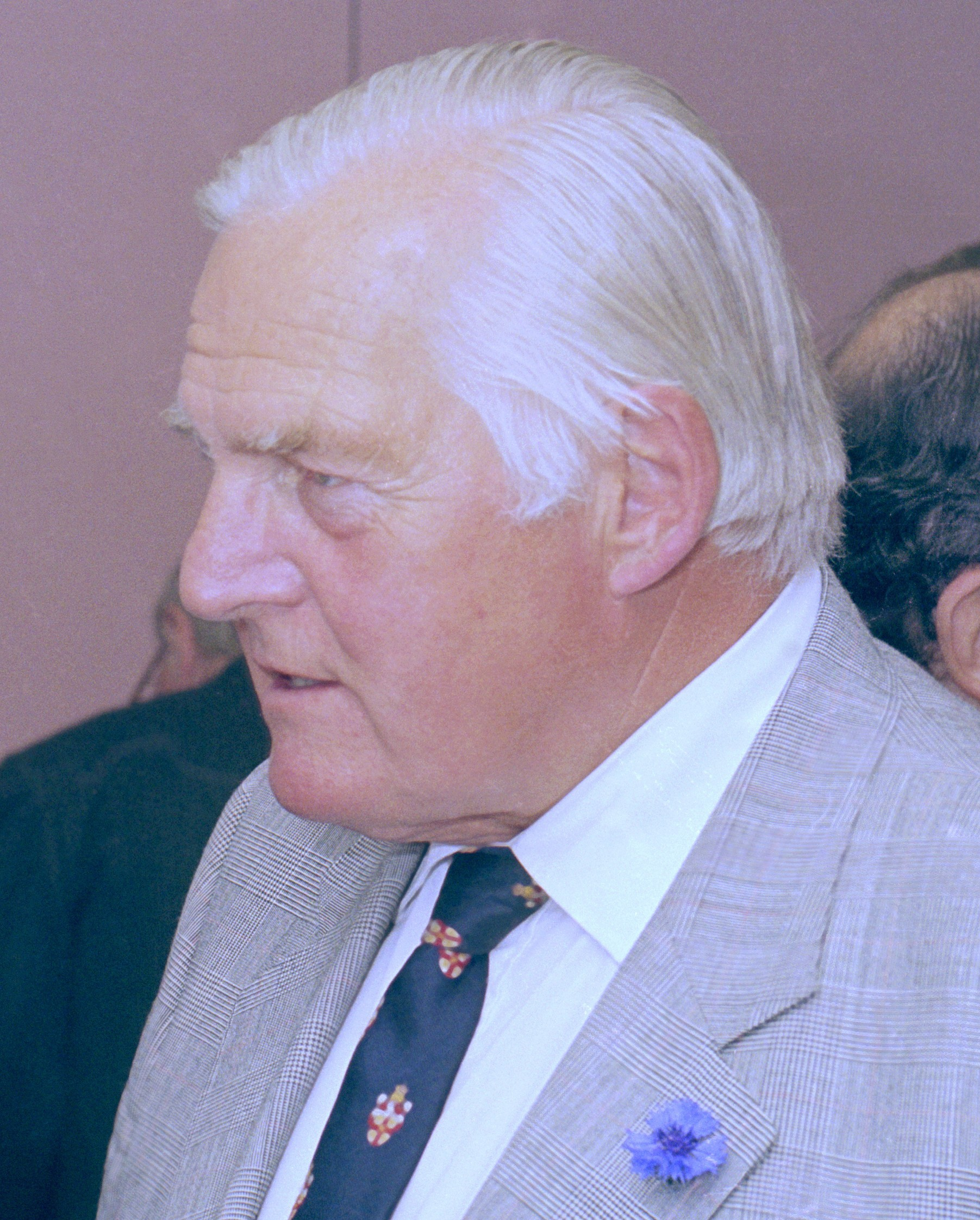
Keith Ross

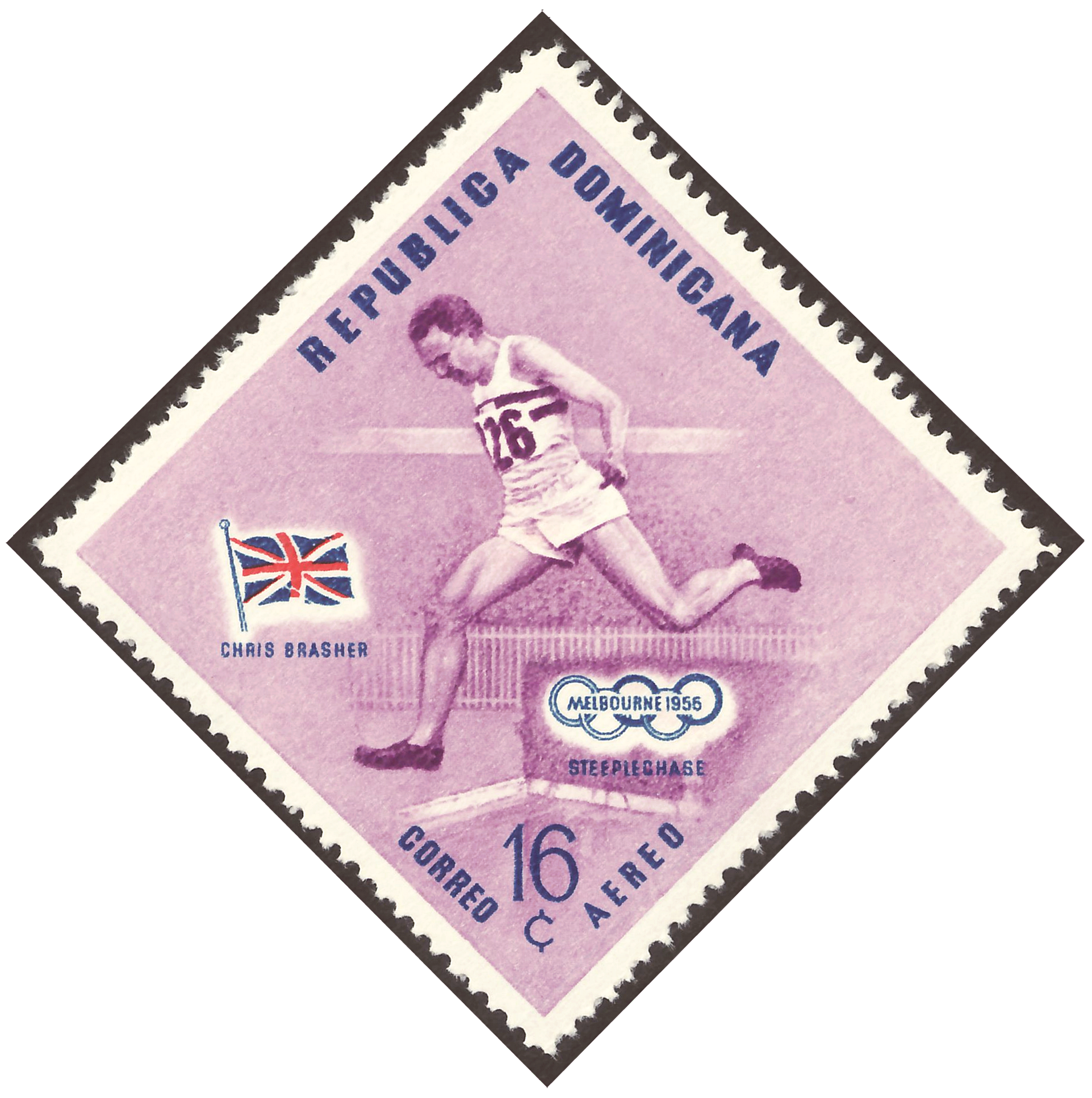
Chris Brasher on a Dominican stamp

- 2 February – Jack Lauterwasser, racing cyclist (fall) (born 1904)
- 3 February – Trevor Morris, Welsh footballer (Cardiff City) (born 1920)
- 4 February – Charles McLaren, 3rd Baron Aberconway, horticulturalist and industrialist (born 1913)
- 6 February
  - Sir Peter Saunders, theatre impresario (born 1911)
  - Alec Stokes, physicist (born 1919)
- 7 February
  - Malcolm Roberts, singer (born 1944)
  - Leader Stirling, missionary surgeon (born 1906); died in Tanzania
  - Stephen Whittaker, actor (born 1947)
- 9 February
  - H. Douglas Keith, physicist (born 1927)
  - Ken McKinlay, speedway rider (born 1928)
- 11 February – Marc Iliffe, strongman (suicide) (born 1972)
- 12 February
  - Frederick Higginson, World War II air ace (born 1913)
  - Sir Brian Stanbridge, Air Force officer (born 1924)
- 14 February
  - Nick Duncombe, rugby union player (born 1982)
  - Dolly the Sheep, cloned sheep (born 1996)
- 15 February – Richard Wilberforce, Baron Wilberforce, judge (born 1907)
- 16 February – Philip John Gardner, World War II soldier and Victoria Cross recipient (born 1914)
- 18 February
  - Len Garrison, Jamaican-born historian and community activist (born 1943)
  - Keith Ross, surgeon (born 1927)
- 21 February – Eddie Thomson, Scottish footballer (Heart of Midlothian) (born 1947)
- 23 February – Christopher Hill, historian (born 1912)
- 27 February – John Lanchbery, composer (born 1923); died in Australia
- 28 February – Chris Brasher, athlete, co-founder of the London Marathon (born 1928)

=== March ===
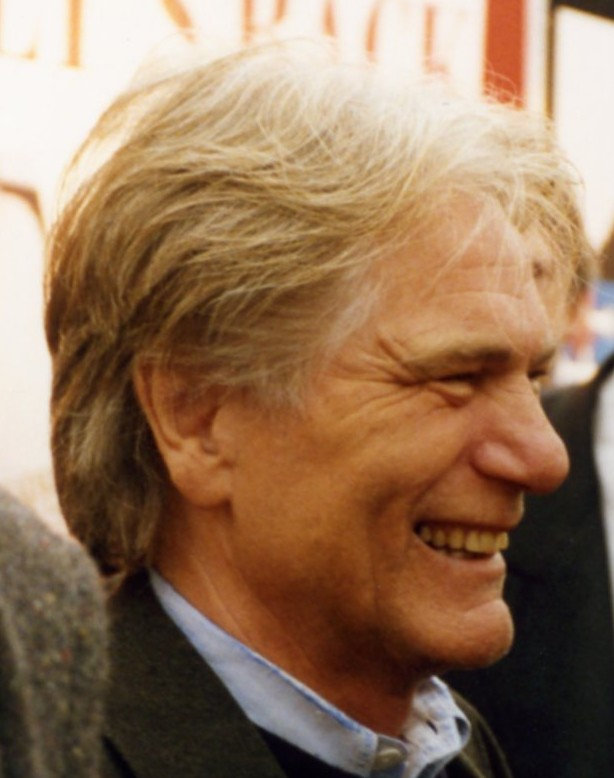
Adam Faith

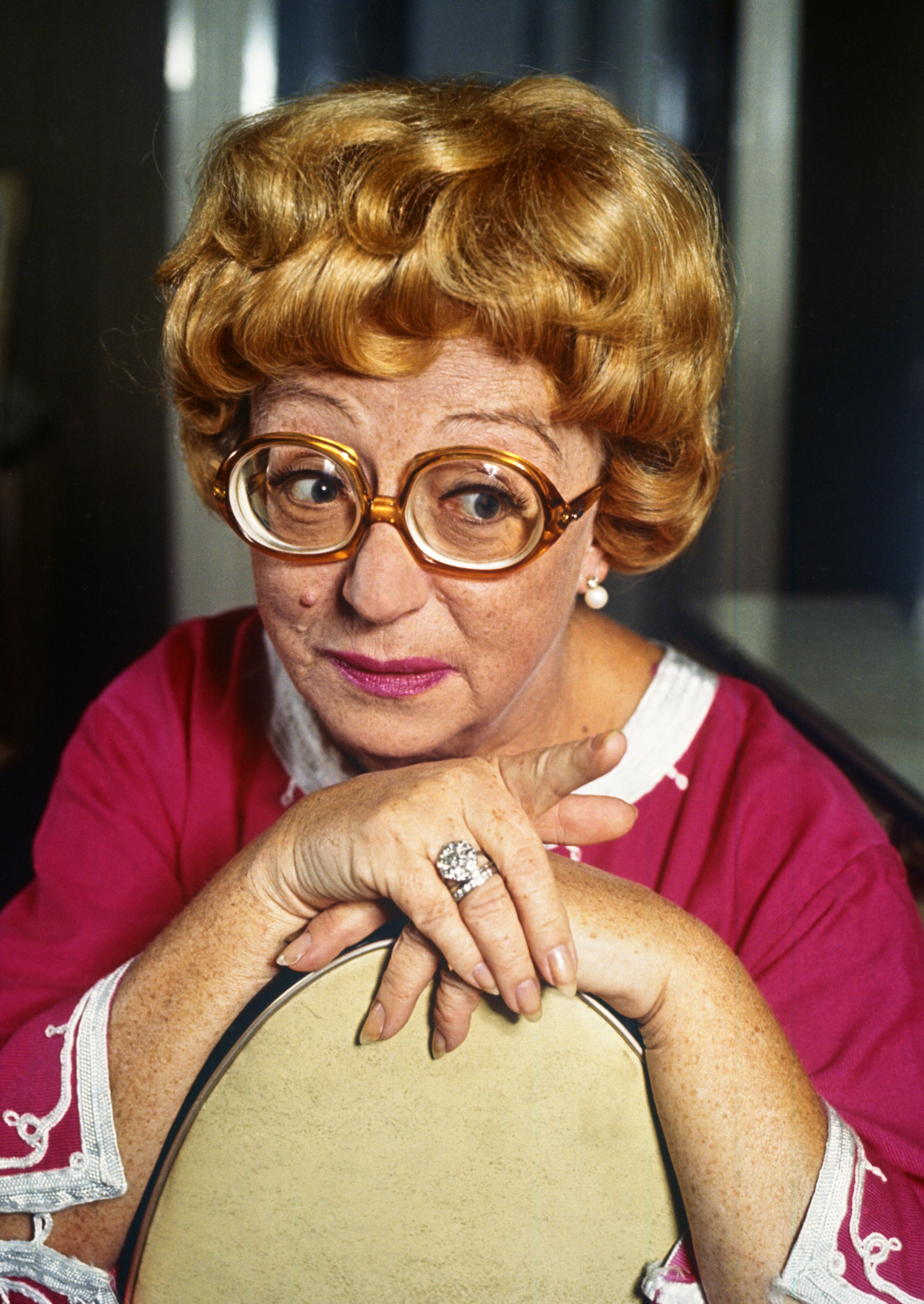
Dame Thora Hird

- 1 March – Roger Needham, computer scientist (born 1935)
- 2 March
  - William Blezard, composer (born 1921)
  - Sir George Edwards, aircraft designer (born 1908)
  - Sir Ian Hogg, admiral (born 1911)
  - Malcolm Williamson, Australian-born composer, Master of the Queen's Musick (born 1931)
- 8 March – Adam Faith, actor and singer (born 1940)
- 10 March
  - Tom Boardman, Baron Boardman, Conservative politician and businessman (born 1919)
  - Lionel Frederick Dakers, organist (born 1924)
  - Geoffrey Kirk, classical scholar (born 1921)
  - Barry Sheene, motorcycle racer (born 1950)
- 11 March
  - Brian Cleeve, English-Irish author and playwright (born 1921)
  - Kevin Laffan, screenwriter (Emmerdale) (born 1922)
- 13 March – Ian Samwell, musician and singer-songwriter (born 1937)
- 15 March – Dame Thora Hird, comic actress (born 1911)
- 17 March
  - Alan Keith, actor and radio presenter (born 1908)
  - Beatrice Wright, Lady Wright, American-born politician (born 1910)
- 22 March – Terry Lloyd, ITN television journalist (killed in Iraq) (born 1952)
- 25 March
  - Christopher French, judge (born 1925)
  - Michael Kidron, cartographer and revolutionary (born 1930)
- 27 March – Jeremiah Duggan, student (road accident) (born 1980)
- 28 March – Sir Kenneth Porter, air marshal (born 1912)
- 29 March – Maude Storey, nurse (born 1930)
- 30 March – Andy Barr, Northern Irish communist and trade unionist (born 1913)

=== April ===
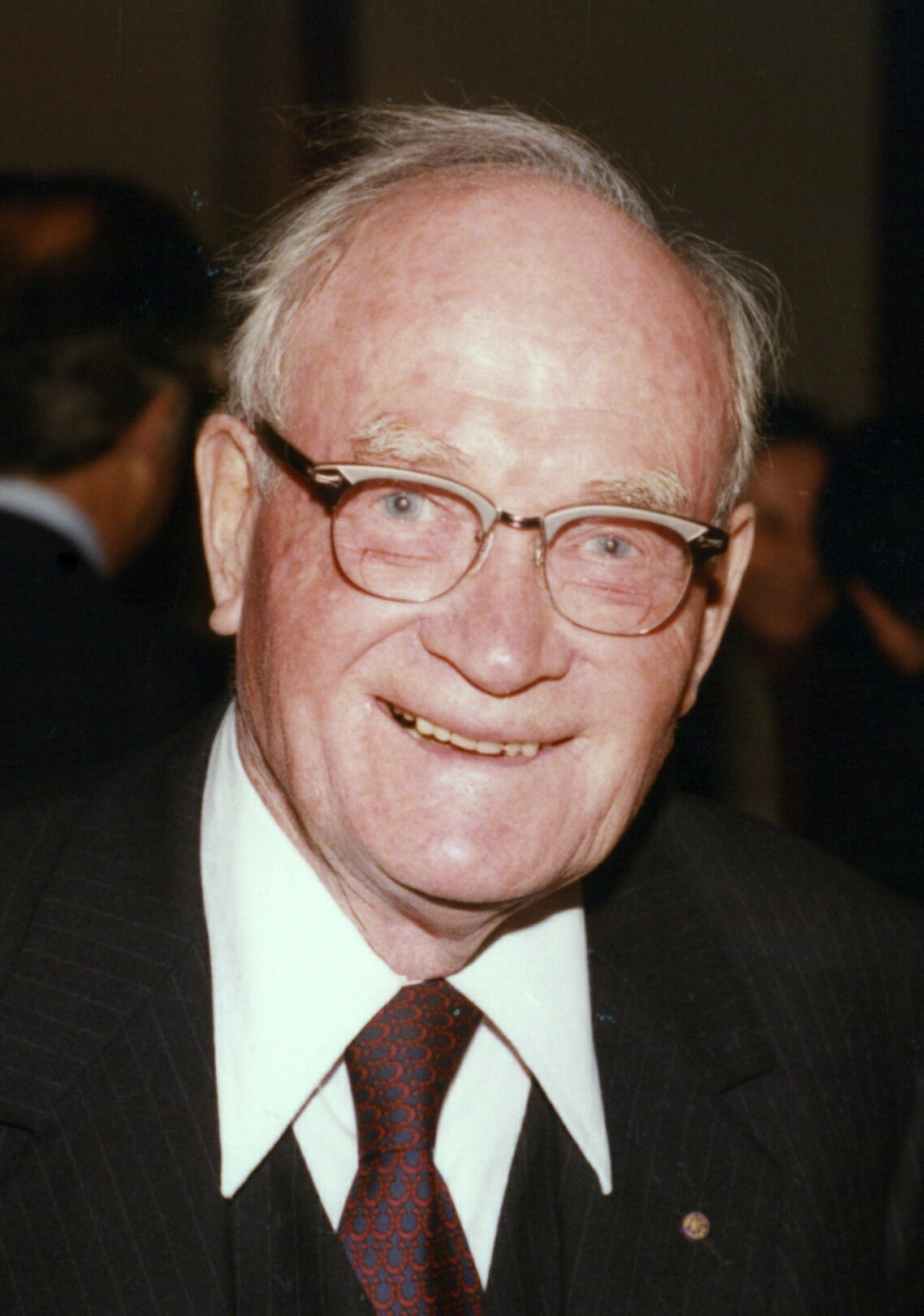
Cecil Howard Green

- 1 April – Richard Caddel, poet (born 1949)
- 4 April – Billy McPhail, Scottish footballer (born 1928)
- 5 April – Beti Rhys, Welsh author and bookseller (born 1908)
- 7 April – David Greene, television and film director (born 1921)
- 11 April
  - Cecil Howard Green, geophysicist and businessman (born 1900)
  - Peter Lloyd, mountaineer and engineer (born 1907)
- 14 April – Bob Evans, Welsh rugby union player (born 1921)
- 16 April
  - Jock Hamilton-Baillie, World War II soldier (born 1919)
  - Danny O'Dea, actor (born 1911)
- 17 April
  - Sir Paul Getty, American-born philanthropist and book collector (born 1932)
  - Graham Stuart Thomas, horticulturalist (born 1909)
  - Peter Cathcart Wason, psychologist (born 1924)
- 18 April – Edgar F. Codd, computer scientist (born 1923)
- 20 April – Johnny Douglas, musician and composer (born 1920)
- 22 April – Berkeley Smith, broadcaster (born 1918)
- 23 April – Guy Mountfort, advertising executive and ornithologist (born 1905)
- 25 April
  - Lynn Chadwick, sculptor (born 1914)
  - Dick Moore, World War II naval officer and George Cross recipient (born 1916)
- 26 April – Edward Max Nicholson, environmentalist (born 1904)
- 29 April – Angus Campbell-Gray, 22nd Lord Gray, Scottish peer (born 1931)
- 30 April – Jennifer d'Abo, entrepreneur (born 1945)

=== May ===
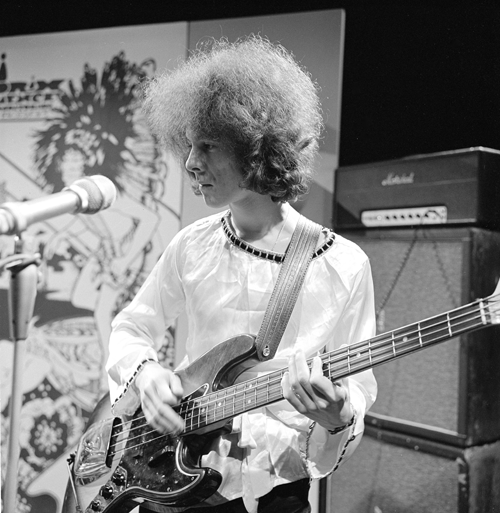
Noel Redding

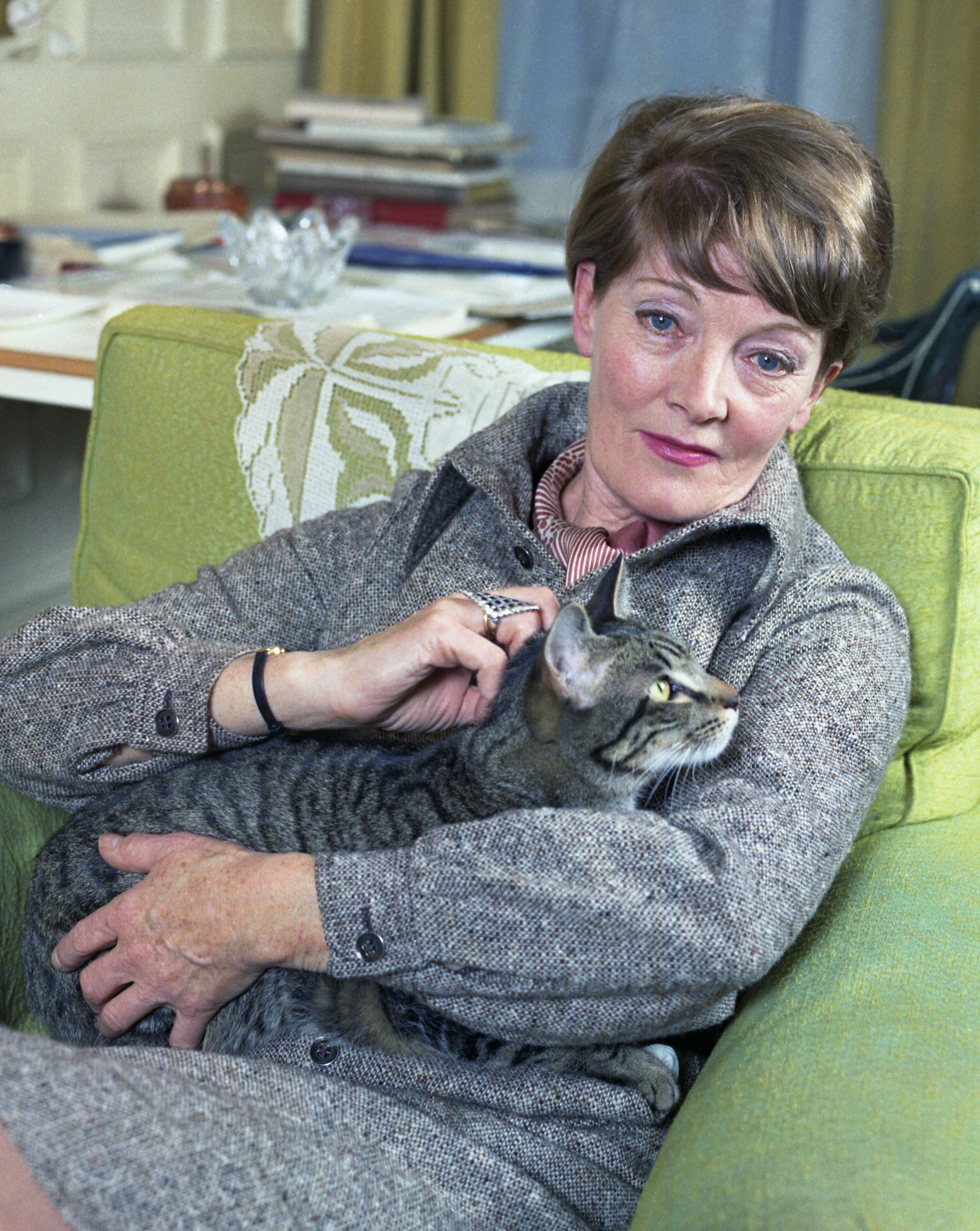
Rachel Kempson

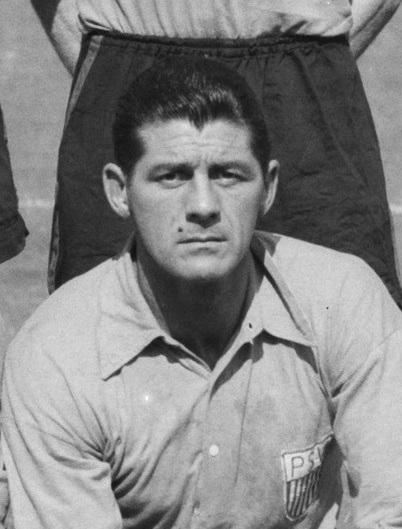
Trevor Ford

- 2 May
  - James Miller, film-maker (killed in Gaza) (born 1968)
  - Laurence O'Keeffe, diplomat, Ambassador to Czechoslovakia during the Velvet Revolution (born 1931)
- 3 May – Lucy Barfield, goddaughter of C. S. Lewis and eponym for Lucy Pevensie in The Chronicles of Narnia (born 1935)
- 4 May
  - Barbara Bailey, nun and artist (born 1910)
  - Arthur Oldham, composer and choirmaster (born 1926)
- 5 May – Philip Powell, architect (born 1921)
- 6 May
  - Colin Gunton, theologian (born 1941)
  - Jocelyn Herbert, stage designer (born 1917)
- 9 May – Sir George Grenfell-Baines, architect and town planner (born 1908)
- 11 May
  - Cecil Allan, Northern Irish footballer (Chelsea, Colchester Town) (born 1914)
  - Noel Redding, rock musician (The Jimi Hendrix Experience, Fat Mattress) (born 1945)
- 12 May
  - Sir Michael Richardson, investment banker (born 1925)
  - Don Ryder, Baron Ryder of Eaton Hastings, businessman and politician (born 1916)
  - Jeremy Sandford, television screenwriter (born 1930)
- 13 May – Theo Aronson, royal biographer (born 1929)
- 14 May – Dame Wendy Hiller, actress (born 1912)
- 15 May – Sir Desmond Dreyer, admiral (born 1910)
- 18 May – Peter Lasko, German-born art historian (born 1924)
- 23 May – Dame Diana Collins, human rights activist and wife of Canon John Collins (born 1917)
- 24 May – Rachel Kempson, actress and wife of Sir Michael Redgrave (born 1910)
- 29 May
  - Trevor Ford, Welsh footballer (Swansea Town, Aston Villa, Cardiff City) (born 1923)
  - David Jefferies, motorcycle racer (killed while training) (born 1972)
- 30 May – John Roberts, historian (born 1928)

=== June ===
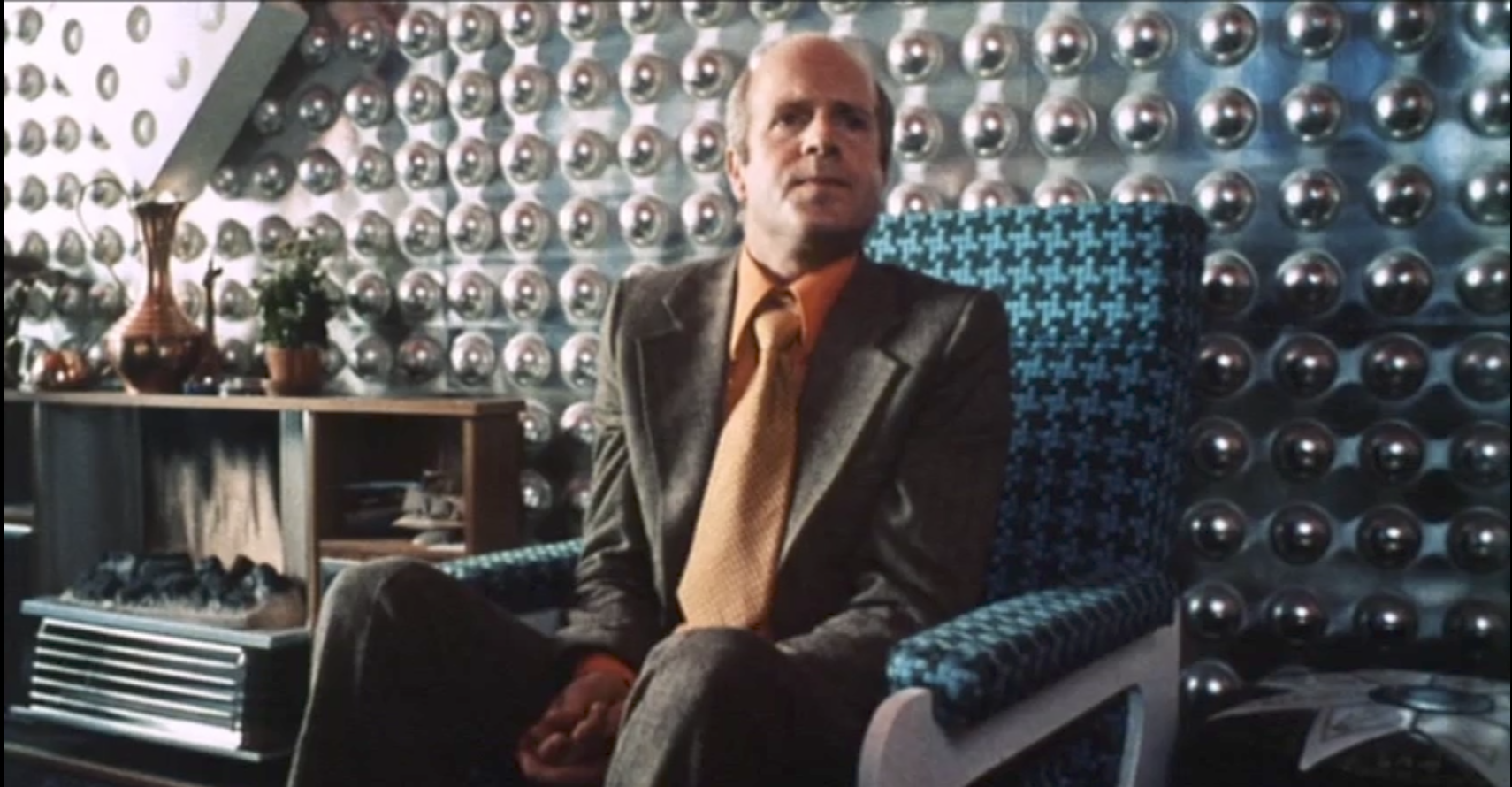
Philip Stone

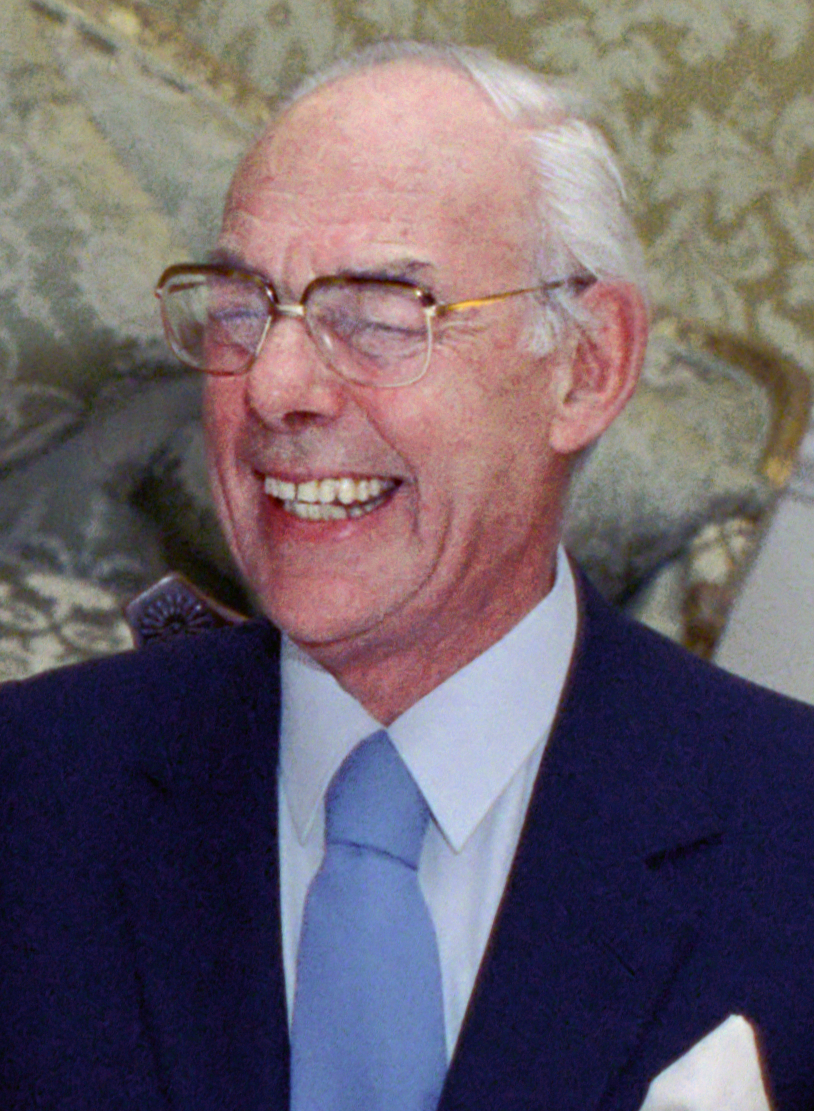
Sir Denis Thatcher

- 1 June – Peter Yarranton, rugby union player and manager (born 1924)
- 3 June
  - Sir Anthony Barrowclough, lawyer and government ombudsman (born 1924)
  - John Jympson, film editor (born 1930)
- 6 June – Dave Rowberry, singer-songwriter and pianist (The Animals) (born 1940)
- 7 June
  - Trevor Goddard, actor (drug overdose) (born 1962)
  - Tony McAuley, Northern Irish broadcaster and musician (born 1939)
- 8 June – Leighton Rees, Welsh darts player (born 1940)
- 10 June
  - Bernard Williams, philosopher (born 1929)
  - Phil Williams, Welsh politician and scientist (born 1939)
- 13 June – Robin Russell, 14th Duke of Bedford, peer (born 1940)
- 15 June
  - Sir Ralph Kilner Brown, athlete and judge (born 1909)
  - Philip Stone, actor (born 1924)
- 16 June – Peter Redgrove, poet (born 1932)
- 17 June – Paul Hirst, sociologist and political theorist (born 1946)
- 18 June
  - Sir Kenneth Cross, World War II air commander (born 1911)
  - Paul Daisley, Labour politician (born 1957)
- 19 June
  - Jack Butterworth, Baron Butterworth, lawyer (born 1918)
  - Laura Sadler, actress (fall) (born 1980)
- 26 June
  - Marc-Vivien Foé, British-based Cameroonian footballer (born 1975); died in France while playing football for the Cameroon national football team
  - Sir Denis Thatcher, husband of prime minister Margaret Thatcher (born 1915)
- 27 June – John Stokes, Conservative politician (born 1917)

=== July ===
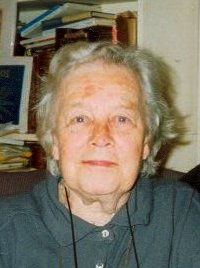
Kathleen Raine

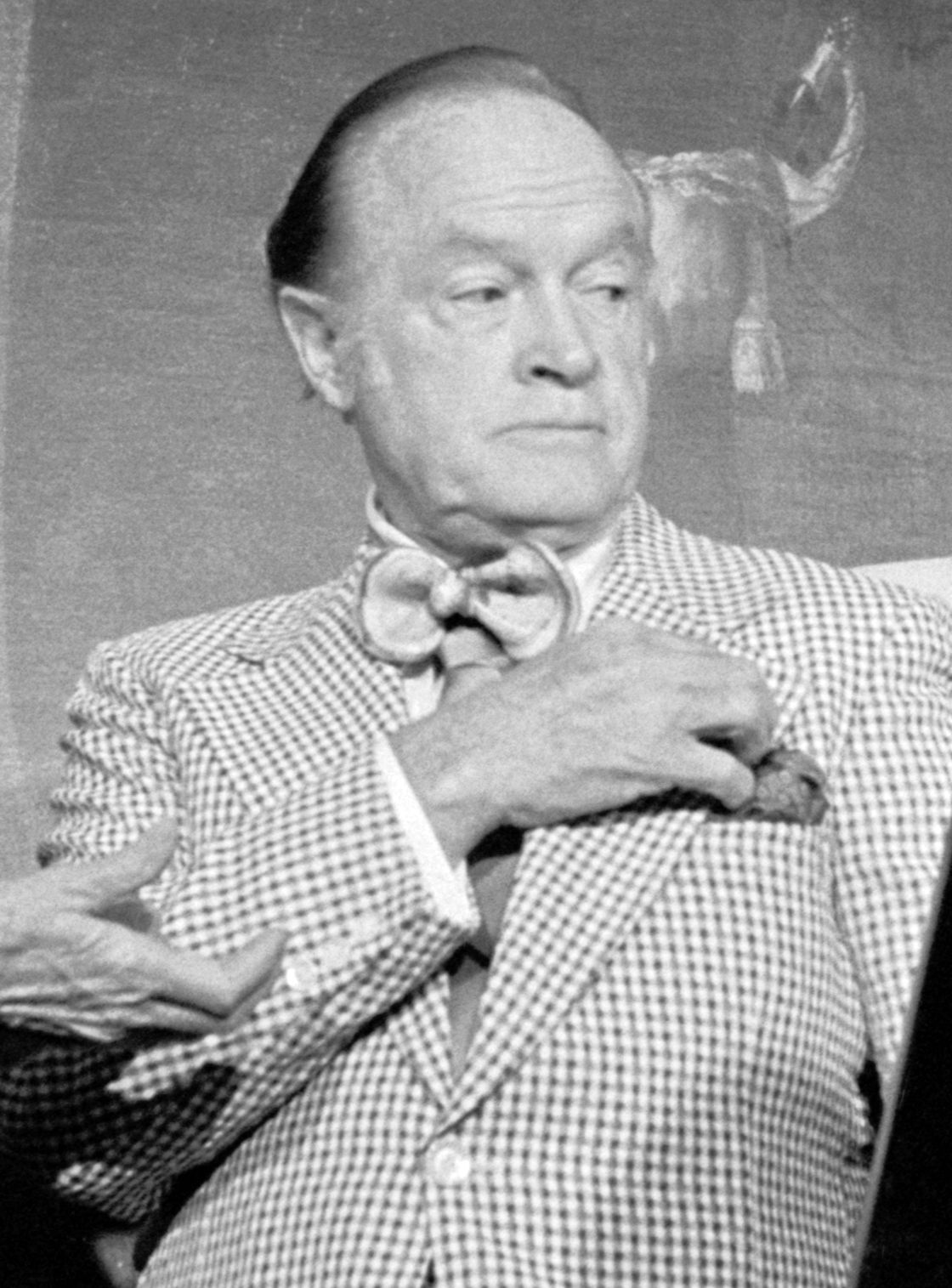
Bob Hope

- 1 July – George Roper, comedian (born 1934)
- 3 July – Sir Charles Tidbury, brewing executive (born 1926)
- 6 July
  - Michael Hoban, teacher (born 1921)
  - Kathleen Raine, poet and critic (born 1908)
- 7 July – Paul Brand, doctor and surgeon (born 1914)
- 8 July – Duncan Clark, Olympic hammer thrower (born 1915)
- 9 July – Valerie Gearon, actress (born 1937)
- 10 July
  - Winston Graham, novelist (born 1908)
  - Hartley Shawcross, Baron Shawcross, chief prosecutor at the Nuremberg trials (born 1902)
- 11 July – Ken Whyld, chess player and chess writer (born 1926)
- 15 July
  - Judith Hare, Countess of Listowel, Hungarian-born writer and journalist (born 1903)
  - Alexander Walker, film critic (born 1930)
  - Elisabeth Welch, American-born singer (born 1904)
- 17 July
  - Pat Fillingham, test pilot for the de Havilland company (born 1914)
  - Dr. David Kelly, government weapons expert (born 1944); suspected suicide
- 19 July – Maldwyn James, Welsh rugby union player (born 1913)
- 20 July – Nicolas Freeling, novelist (born 1927)
- 22 July – Norman Lewis, travel writer (born 1908)
- 25 July – John Schlesinger, film director (born 1926)
- 27 July – Bob Hope, comedian (born 1903)
- 29 July – Sir Gerard Vaughan, psychiatrist and politician (born 1923)
- 30 July
  - Will Atkinson, folk musician (born 1908)
  - Steve Hislop, motorcycle racer (helicopter accident) (born 1962)

=== August ===
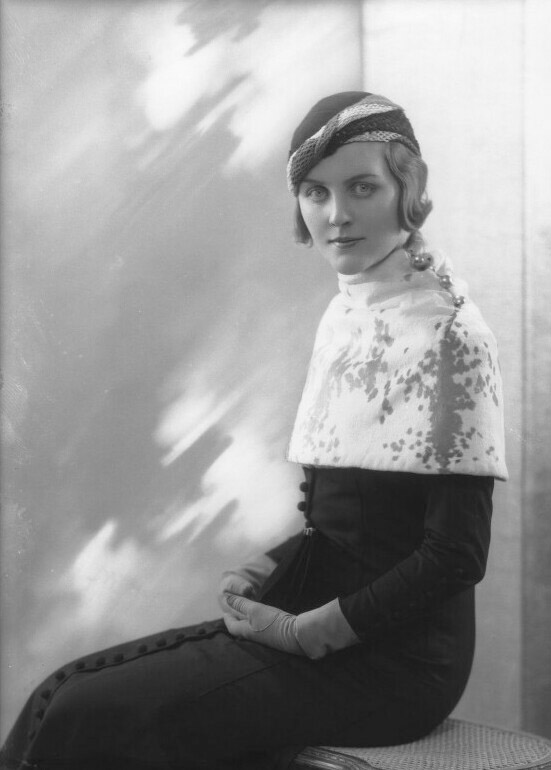
Diana Mosley

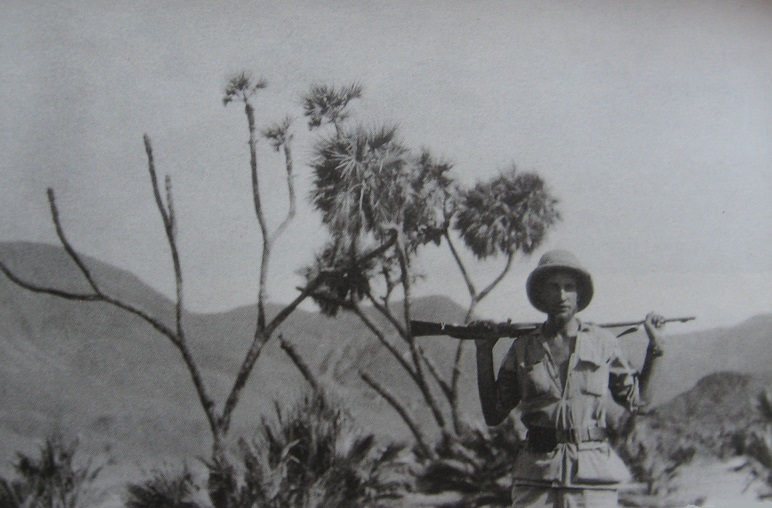
Sir Wilfred Thesiger

- 2 August
  - Don Estelle, actor (born 1933)
  - Sir Charles Kerruish, Manx politician (born 1917)
- 6 August – Larry Taylor, actor and stuntman (born 1918)
- 9 August
  - Jimmy Davis, English footballer (Manchester United) (car accident) (born 1982)
  - Ray Harford, English footballer (Exeter City, Lincoln City) and football manager (Luton Town) (born 1945)
- 10 August
  - Constance Chapman, actress (born 1912)
  - Cedric Price, architect and writer (born 1934)
- 11 August
  - Diana Mosley, writer, socialite and wife of Sir Oswald Mosley (born 1910)
  - John Shearman, art historian (born 1931)
- 13 August – Michael Maclagan, historian (born 1914)
- 18 August – Tony Jackson, singer (The Searchers) (born 1938)
- 20 August
  - Ian MacDonald, music critic (born 1948)
  - Brianne Murphy, cinematographer (born 1933)
  - Andrew Ray, actor (born 1939)
- 21 August
  - John Coplans, artist, curator and museum director (born 1920)
  - Fraser Noble, Scottish academic (born 1918)
  - Kathy Wilkes, philosopher and academic (born 1946)
- 24 August
  - Sir Wilfred Thesiger, soldier and explorer (born 1910)
  - Zena Walker, actress (born 1934)
  - Kent Walton, sports commentator (born 1917)
- 26 August – Clive Charles, English footballer (West Ham United, Cardiff City) (born 1951)

=== September ===
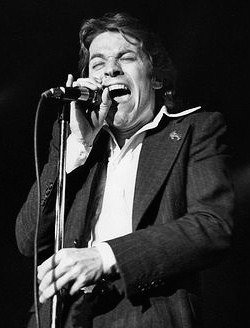
Robert Palmer

- 1 September
  - Terry Frost, artist (born 1915)
  - Sir John Gray, diplomat (born 1936)
- 2 September
  - George Chubb, 3rd Baron Hayter, politician and industrialist (born 1911)
  - Peter West, sports commentator and television presenter (born 1920)
- 3 September – Norman Porteous, theologian and last surviving British Army officer of World War I (born 1898)
- 4 September – Ben Aris, actor (born 1937)
- 5 September – C. H. Sisson, writer and poet (born 1914)
- 9 September
  - Thomas Allibone, physicist (born 1903)
  - Sir Francis Purchas, judge (born 1919)
- 12 September – Brian Plummer, writer and dog breeder (born 1936)
- 13 September – Arthur Rowe, Olympic shot putter (born 1936)
- 15 September – Jack Brymer, clarinettist (born 1915)
- 17 September
  - Derek Bryan, diplomat, sinologist and author (born 1910)
  - George Gale, cartoonist (born 1929)
- 19 September – Jim Thompson, Anglican prelate, Bishop of Bath and Wells (1991–2001) (born 1936)
- 20 September
  - Robert Blake, Baron Blake, historian and peer (born 1916)
  - Gareth Williams, Baron Williams of Mostyn, Labour politician and Leader of the House of Lords (born 1941)
- 22 September
  - Sir Allan Gilmour, Army colonel and World War II veteran (born 1916)
  - Hugo Young, journalist (born 1938)
- 24 September – Derek Prince, Biblical scholar (born 1915)
- 25 September – Donald Nicol, Byzantinist (born 1923)
- 26 September
  - Glyn Gilbert, Army general (born 1920)
  - Jonny Kennedy, sufferer of dystrophic epidermolysis bullosa (born 1966)
  - Robert Palmer, singer (born 1949)
  - David Williams, crime writer (born 1926)

=== October ===
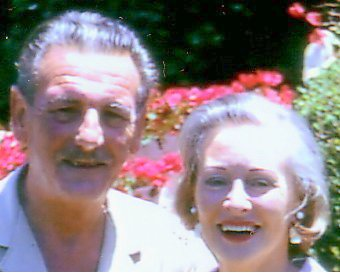
Anne Ziegler (right) with her husband Webster Booth

- 3 October – Winifred Watkins, biochemist (born 1924)
- 4 October – Mary Donaldson, Baroness Donaldson of Lymington, first woman Lord Mayor of London (born 1921)
- 5 October – Denis Quilley, actor (born 1927)
- 6 October
  - Joe Baker, English footballer (Arsenal, Nottingham Forest) (born 1940)
  - Sir Antony Buck, Conservative politician (born 1928)
- 9 October – Judith Pierce, operatic soprano (born 1930)
- 10 October
  - Max Rayne, Baron Rayne, property developer and philanthropist (born 1918)
  - Julia Trevelyan Oman, stage designer (born 1930)
- 11 October
  - Vivien Alcock, writer of children's books (born 1924)
  - Franklyn Perring, botanist (born 1927)
- 13 October – Anne Ziegler, soprano (born 1910)
- 14 October – Patrick Dalzel-Job, World War II naval commando (born 1913)
- 17 October – Clare Venables, theatre director (born 1943)
- 19 October – Sir Peter Berger, admiral, survivor of the Amethyst Incident (born 1925)
- 20 October – Peter Morgan, motor-car maker (Morgan Motor Company) (born 1919)
- 21 October – John Walter Baxter, civil engineer and designer of London's Westway (born 1917)
- 23 October
  - Tony Capstick, actor (born 1944)
  - Pete Chisman, cyclist (born 1940)
- 25 October – Noreen Branson, Communist activist (born 1910)
- 27 October – Elisabeth Lambert Ortiz, food writer (born 1915)
- 31 October – Daphne Hardy Henrion, sculptor (born 1917)

=== November ===
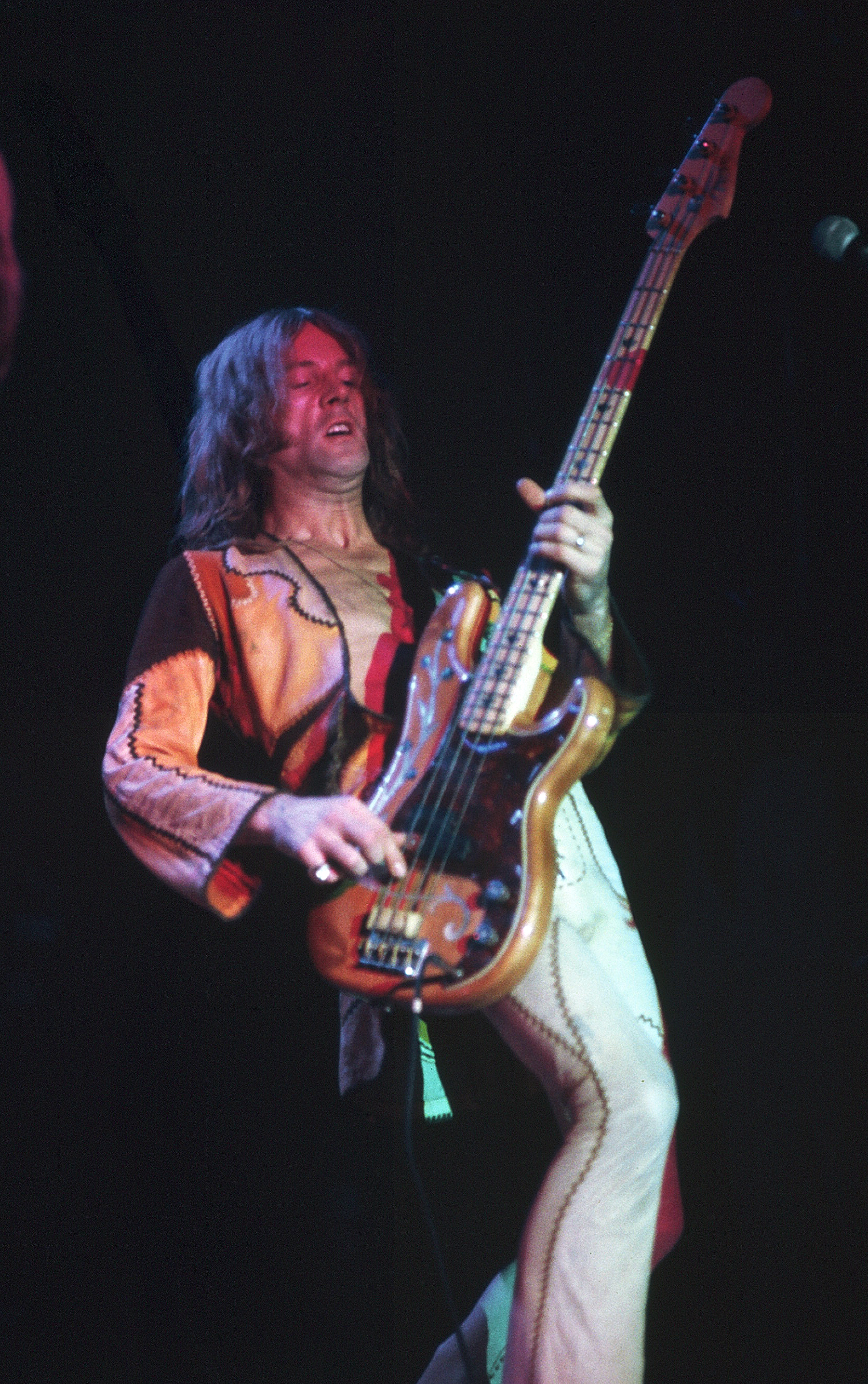
Greg Ridley

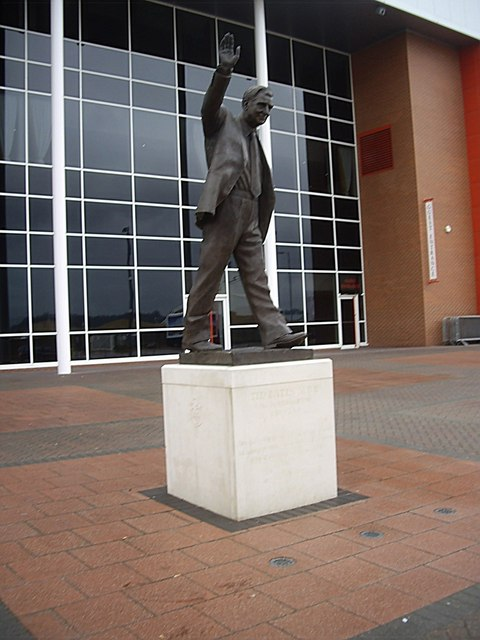
Ted Bates

- 1 November
  - W. Brian Harland, geologist (born 1917)
  - Colin Hayes, painter (born 1919)
- 2 November – Christabel Bielenberg, author (born 1909)
- 4 November
  - Lotte Berk, German-born dancer and dance teacher (born 1913)
  - Charles Causley, poet (born 1917)
  - Richard Wollheim, philosopher (born 1923)
- 7 November – Foo Foo Lammar, drag queen (born 1937)
- 11 November
  - Robert Brown, actor (born 1921)
  - Harold Walker, Baron Walker of Doncaster, Labour politician (born 1927)
  - George Wallace, Baron Wallace of Coslany, Labour politician (born 1906)
- 14 November
  - Giles Gordon, Scottish writer and literary agent (born 1940)
  - Tim Vigors, World War II air ace and horse breeder (born 1921)
- 19 November
  - Gillian Barge, actress (born 1940)
  - Greg Ridley, rock bassist (Humble Pie) (born 1941)
- 20 November
  - Robert Addie, actor (born 1960)
  - Ernest Radcliffe Bond, soldier and Metropolitan Police commissioner (born 1919)
  - Roger Short, diplomat (terrorist attack) (born 1944)
- 23 November – Patricia Burke, singer and actress (born 1917)
- 26 November – Gordon Reid, actor (born 1939)
- 27 November – Marjorie Reeves, historian and educationalist (born 1905)
- 28 November – Ted Bates, footballer and football manager (Southampton) (born 1918)
- 29 November – Jesse Carver, footballer and football manager (Blackburn Rovers, Newcastle United) (born 1911)

=== December ===
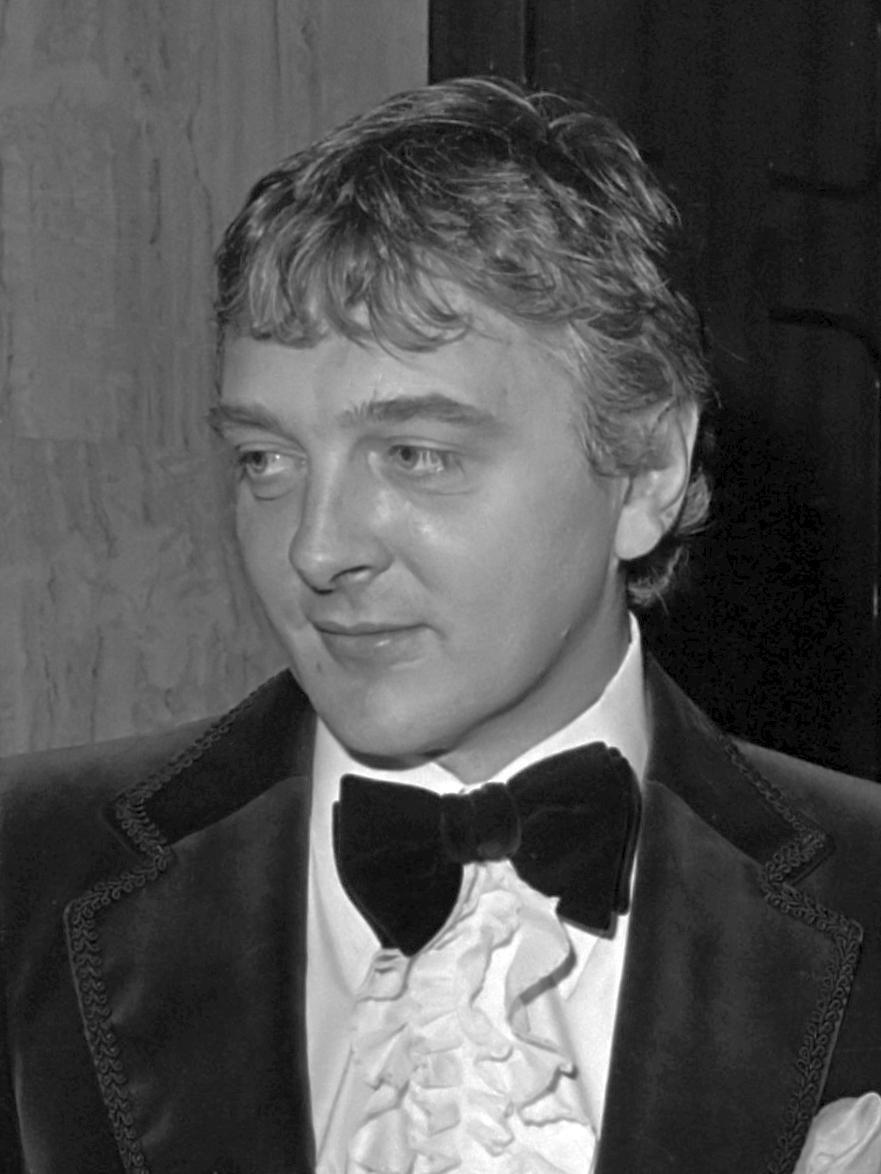
David Hemmings

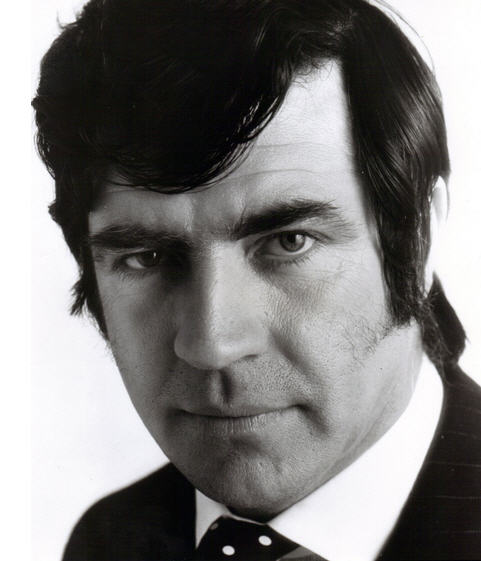
Sir Alan Bates

- 1 December – Hamza Alvi, Pakistani-born sociologist and activist (born 1921)
- 2 December – Alan Davidson, food writer (born 1924)
- 3 December – David Hemmings, actor and film director (born 1941)
- 4 December – David Vaughan, psychedelic artist (born 1944)
- 5 December – Antony Rowe, rower (born 1924)
- 11 December – Malcolm Clarke, composer (born 1943)
- 15 December
  - Johnny Cunningham, folk musician (born 1957)
  - Jack Gregory, athlete (born 1923)
- 17 December – Alan Tilvern, actor and voice artist (born 1918)
- 18 December
  - Jack Dormand, Baron Dormand of Easington, Labour politician (born 1919)
  - Susan Travers, World War II nurse, only British woman to serve in the French Foreign Legion (born 1909)
- 19 December – Les Tremayne, actor (born 1913)
- 21 December – Sir Gawaine Baillie, race car driver, industrialist and stamp collector (born 1934)
- 22 December – Rose Hill, actress and soprano (born 1914)
- 23 December – John Sanders, organist and composer (born 1933)
- 27 December – Sir Alan Bates, actor (born 1934)
- 28 December – John Terraine, military historian (born 1921)
- 29 December
  - Dickie Davis, cricketer (born 1965)
  - Dinsdale Landen, actor (cancer) (born 1932)
  - Don Lawrence, comic book artist (born 1928)
  - Bob Monkhouse, comedian and game show host (born 1928)

== See also ==
- 2003 in British music
- 2003 in British television
- List of British films of 2003
- 2003 in England
