= Ginger (book) =

Charlotte Voake book

- Author: Charlotte Voake
- Language: English
- Genre: Children's
- Publisher: Walker Books
- Publication date: 3 February 1997
- Publication place: United Kingdom
- Pages: 33 pp
- ISBN: 0-7445-4934-5
- OCLC: 38207310
- Followed by: Ginger Finds a Home

Ginger is a children's picture book by Charlotte Voake. In 1997 it won the Nestlé Smarties Book Prize Gold Award. It is about a pampered house cat who resents the sudden appearance of a kitten in her life. The book is followed by Ginger Finds a Home, a prequel, and Ginger and the Mystery Visitor, in which Ginger and the kitten confront a stranger.
