= March Boedihardjo =

Hong Kong mathematician

March Tian Boedihardjo 沈詩鈞
- Born: Hong Kong
- Occupation: Mathematician
- Known for: Child prodigy

March Tian Boedihardjo (Chinese: 沈詩鈞) is a Hong Kong mathematician. He is a former child prodigy of ethnic Hokkien descent with ancestry from Anxi, Quanzhou, China. As of 2023, he is an assistant professor of mathematics at Michigan State University.

== Biography ==
Boedihardjo was born to an ethnic Chinese family in Hong Kong, with family roots in Anxi, China. Boedihardjo moved to the United Kingdom in 2005, when his older brother Horatio began studying at the University of Oxford.

Boedihardjo finished his A-level exams in Britain at the age of nine years and three months, after attending Greene's College Oxford. (Note: Record for the youngest person to pass maths A-level with an A grade at the time, but has since been surpassed by Yasha Asley, see "Boy, 8, sets A-level maths record". BBC News. 13 March 2009. and "Boy, 8, gets A in A-level maths". BBC News. 30 March 2011.) He also gained 8 GCSEs. He was accepted at Hong Kong Baptist University, making him the youngest ever university student in Hong Kong. He commenced his university studies in September 2007. The university tailored a special 5-year curriculum programme for Boedihardjo which he criticized as being too easy and unstimulating on the first day. He obtained A−'s and B+'s in most of his mathematics courses in his first year, which got him on the Dean's List. He was conferred a Bachelor of Science in Mathematical Science and a Master of Philosophy in Mathematics after completing his programme one year early in 2011.

After graduating from Hong Kong Baptist University, Boedihardjo studied at Texas A&M University as a visiting scholar and then as a PhD student. In 2017, Boediharjo took up the position of assistant adjunct professor at UCLA on a three-year contract, a position he held until 2020. He was a visiting assistant professor at UC Irvine from 2021 to 2022 before starting a postdoc at ETH Zurich, a position he held until 2023. He is currently an assistant professor of mathematics at Michigan State University.

== See also ==
- List of child prodigies
