= Pizza Kittens =

2002 children's book by Charlotte Voake

- Author: Charlotte Voake
- Illustrator: Charlotte Voake
- Language: English
- Genre: Children's
- Publisher: Walker Books
- Publication date: May 6, 2002
- Publication place: United Kingdom
- Pages: 33 pp
- ISBN: 978-0-7445-7595-8
- OCLC: 48885057

Pizza Kittens is a children's picture book by Charlotte Voake, published in 2002. It won the Nestlé Smarties Book Prize Silver Award.
