= Greene's College Oxford =

Coordinates: 51°45′02″N 1°15′27″W

- Oxford, Oxfordshire, OX1 1BP; England

Information
- Type: Independent sixth form
- Motto: Non Sine Numine ("Not Without God's Will")
- Religious affiliation: Church of England
- Established: 1967
- Founder: Edward Greene
- Master: Christopher Upton
- Staff: ~15 administration members and approximately 150 tutors
- Gender: co-educational
- Age: ~16 to 18+ (no age restriction)
- Colour: Greene's Green
- Former Pupils: Old Greenites
- Website: www.greenesoxford.com

Greene's College Oxford (formerly Greene's Tutorial College, informally Greene's) is an independent (i.e. private) co-educational sixth form tutorial college (an educational institution which combines characteristics of a tuition centre and a college) in Oxford, England, UK. The college specialises in providing individualised tuition based on the Oxbridge tutorial system for students of any age, though mainly 16-18-year-olds.

== History ==
The history of Greene’s College Oxford goes back to 1967 when Oxford classics graduate Edward Greene founded a small tutorial college known as Edward Greene’s Tutorial Establishment in the 17th century buildings of 45 Pembroke Street in Oxford. Greene's is the oldest tutorial college operating in Oxford.

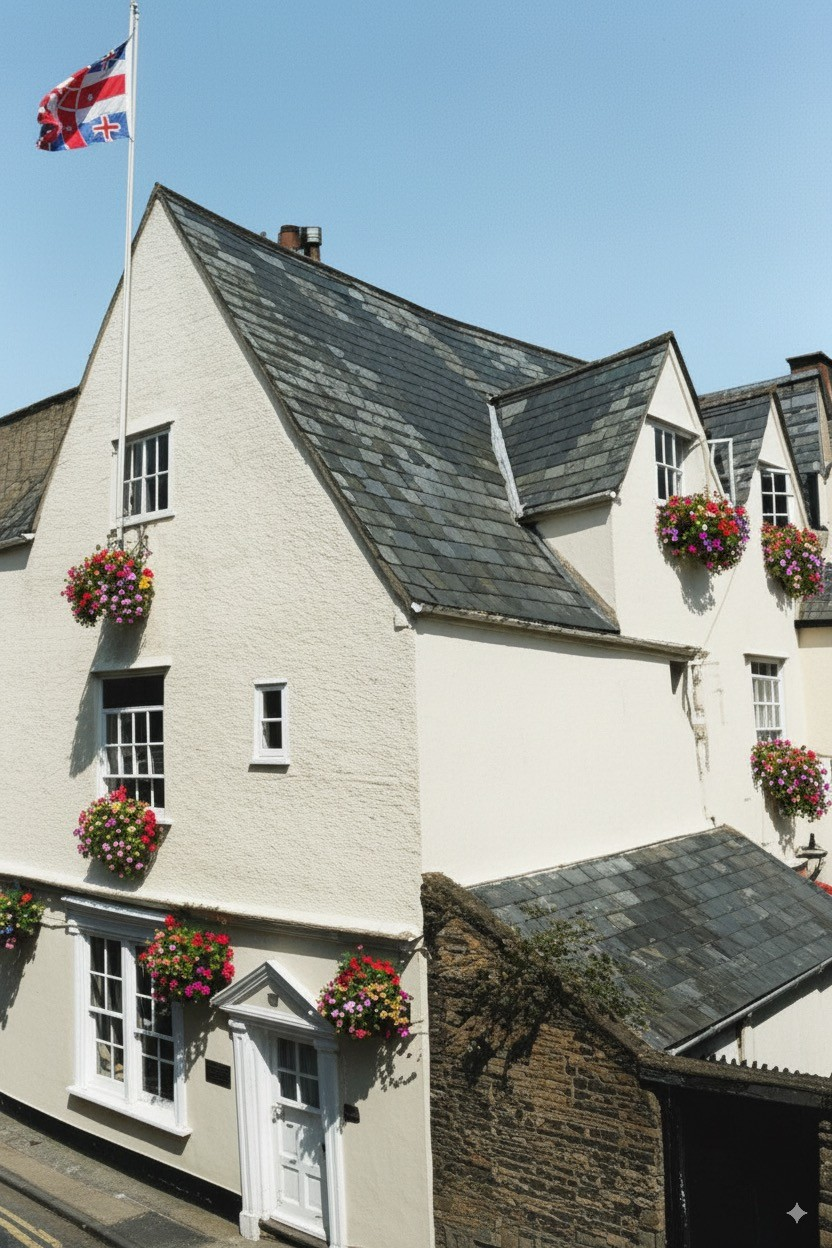
Building of Greene's College Oxford

Traditionally an Oxbridge preparatory crammer which provided private tutoring exclusively for Oxford and Cambridge entrance, Greene's today prepares students for admission to universities worldwide. After the retirement of Edward Greene, the college was taken over by Christopher Upton, Matthew Uffindell and Alex Gray, three Oxford-educated tutors.

The college has educated a number of high-profile students, which also includes the math child prodigy March Tian Boedihardjo. March was taught by about seven tutors during his two years of study and passed his school-leaving exams at the age of nine years. Thereafter, he entered a university in Hong Kong.

Though the college used to teach children and adults of all ages, it now mainly educates students aged 16 and over.

== Buildings ==
Greene's has buildings in the city centre of Oxford, near Pembroke College and Christ Church – two constituent colleges of the University of Oxford:

Main Office: The college's administration building is based in the 17th century premises of 45 Pembroke Street.

Study Centre: Teaching and testing for students takes place at the college's study centre and exam halls at 97 St Aldate's Street.

The Main Office and the Study Centre, although technically two separate buildings, are connected through a doorway and essentially form one building.

== Curriculum ==
The college provides preparation for British and international pre-university school-leaving qualifications. Students at Greene's are taught in one-to-one tutorials, the same teaching method practised by the University of Oxford and by the University of Cambridge.

The school offers in-person and online tuition. Tutors set homework after every tutorial, go through it at the next tutorial, and write reports about performance, effort in class, and homework after every class. The majority of the tutors are Oxford graduates.

== Academic achievement ==
According to the Independent Schools Inspectorate (ISI) in England, "the college exceeds expectations". Academic results are above national average and examination grades are mostly A* to B.
