= Ginger Finds a Home =

Children's picture book by Charlotte Voake

- Author: Charlotte Voake
- Illustrator: Charlotte Voake
- Language: English
- Genre: Children's picture book
- Published: 2003 (Walker Books)
- Publication place: England
- Media type: Print (hardback)
- Pages: 40 (unpaginated)
- ISBN: 9780744596489
- OCLC: 52196354
- Preceded by: Ginger
- Followed by: Ginger and the Mystery Visitor

Ginger Finds a Home is a 2003 children's picture book by Charlotte Voake. A prequel of Voakes 1996 picture book Ginger, it concerns a young stray cat called Ginger that becomes part of a girl's household.

== Reception ==
Reviews of Ginger Finds a Home have been positive. Library Media Connection recommended it and wrote "A simply illustrated and written book shows how Ginger finds love and friendship through building a trusting relationship." A reviewer for Booklist affirmed Voake's illustrative style writing "Neophyte picture-book artists who cram the pages with saturated colors and busy details have a lot to learn from Voake's economical approach, which makes it easy for young children to sense the characters' emotions and to care about the story's outcome."

Ginger Finds a Home has also been reviewed by Kirkus Reviews, Publishers Weekly, School Library Journal, Horn Book Guides, and Magpies.
