= Hannah Green book series =

Dr. Hannah Green book series
- First editions
- Death by Theory: A Tale of Mystery and Archaeological Theory; Dug to Death: A Tale of Archaeological Method and Mayhem
- Author: Adrian Praetzellis
- Cover artist: Adrian Praetzellis
- Country: United Kingdom
- Language: English
- Genre: fiction, textbook-as-novel
- Publisher: AltaMira Press; AltaMira website
- Published: 2003, 2011
- Media type: Print

Hannah Green, PhD is the fictional main protagonist of Adrian Praetzellis's textbooks-as-novels Death by Theory and Dug to Death, a series of two books that teach archaeological theory through story. The series has been seen by academics as a useful tool for teaching archaeology through the fictional characters and situations.

== Characterizations ==
Dr. Hannah Green is a fictional archaeologist and university professor. Doing her aliyah to Israel when she was twenty-two, Green spent five years in the country working as an archaeological monitor with the Israel Antiquities Authority and was drafted into the IDF Education Corps of the Israeli army, (tasked with checking on rumored archaeological discoveries). Following this Hannah studied the origins of agriculture in prehistoric Europe at London’s Institute of Archaeology. Dr. Green has experience directing field schools and contract archaeology projects. In Death by Theory she is in the process of writing an undergrad text titled “Archaeology from A to Z,” and at the beginning of the book had recently been told that her desire to get a tenured position at Ennui State University in the anthropology department would have to wait another year.

Hannah has a twenty-three-year-old nephew named Sean Doyle who is a post-graduate anthropology major. He also holds an interest in archaeology and works with Hannah in Death by Theory as a shovelbum.

== Appearances ==
Dr. Hannah Green first appears in Death by Theory, in which she travels to Dougal’s Island, Washington to work at an archaeological site where a European Neolithic burial and large stone Venus were found. Accompanied by Sean, Dr. Green uses her archaeological knowledge and experience to call into question evidence and data to investigate the mysterious and out-of-place find. In Dug to Death Dr. Green ventures to New Zealand when she is asked to manage the contract archaeology project at the Wallace site. The contract must be completed before the site is leveled by its owners in favor of the construction of a golf course. "During the course of the excavation, members of the local university's archaeology department mysteriously meet with unfortunate accidents," which brings Hannah into the picture.

== Influence and Inspiration ==
The books' plots allow for the discussion of basic archaeological theory and methods and keep the reader engaged with the theoretical discussions held by the characters (which explain the basics of archaeology). The series had been suggested as being useful for both undergraduate and graduate students by Lawrence E. Babits of East Carolina University. Adrian Praetzellis’s personality and views on archaeology are evident through the material covered in the books, as well as the plot. Fieldwork and getting hands on experience in archaeology is a focal topic, as are ethics and safety. In his review of Death by Theory Babits commented that “archaeologists who have met Pratzellis will recognize his wry humor and puns throughout a teaching text in which the novel serves as background for generalized presentations of theory.” In Andrew R. Sewell's review of Dug to Death, he noted that in Praetzellis's novel the "research designs are thorough; methods are tailored to retrieve the data necessary to answer the research questions; and data from examination of industrial processes, artifacts, and sites are used to say something meaningful about the society of which they were a part," all very important aspects of archaeological practice.

== Educational Value ==
Death by Theory and Dug to Death have garnered attention as being new and innovative texts through which to teach the basics of archaeology. Mary-Catherine E. Garden of the Department of Archaeology at the University of Cambridge spoke in her review of how Death by Theory gives "students new to the discipline a practical working knowledge of the field without overwhelming them" as "Praetzellis deftly moves between the fiction and fact, cleverly blending into plot clear and interesting discussions of what can be sometimes difficult archaeological theory." Garden further stated "with its ease of explanation and helpful illustrations, Death by Theory certainly has a place on any student's shelf as the sort of book that one dips into for a quick reference. More than that, its strength and charm lies in its presentation backed up by a solid treatment of archaeological theory and, in that way, it is the ideal introductory text." In regards to use in an academic setting Babits said of Death by Theory; "while I felt that it would be best used for an undergraduate course, a second and third reading indicated that this easily read booklet would be suitable for graduate students, especially those who come to archaeology from other undergraduate majors with little or no background in anthropology."
