= Yasha Asley =

British mathematics child prodigy

- Born: 2001 or 2002 (age 23–24)
- Education: BSc Hons Mathematics, University of Leicester (2017)
- Known for: Child prodigy

Yasha Asley is a British mathematics child prodigy of Iranian descent.

== Life ==
Raised solely by his father, Moussa, Yasha was gifted at maths from an early age. When he started primary school at the age of four, he was described as having the mathematical ability of a typical twelve-year-old. While attending school Asley passed the A-level exams and became the youngest person to have achieved the 'A' grade in Mathematics at the age of 8 in 2011, surpassing a record previously held by March Tian Boedihardjo.

For three years prior to starting his university education his full-time schooling was split, three days a week at primary school and two days a week he learned mathematics with Professor Alexander Gorban at the University of Leicester.

Although he had met UK university entrance requirements by scoring top grades and was in a position to apply to UK universities, he wanted to continue in the standard education system. In an ITV interview, on 24 July 2018, Yasha said, "... It wasn't our first choice [to go to university]. But then it seemed like the headteacher had told my teachers to slow me down... So we decided that I really had no choice [other than to go to university]." He began his university course at the age of twelve.

In 2017, at the age of 15, he became the university's youngest-ever graduate receiving a first-class degree in mathematics.
