= Charlotte Voake =

Welsh children's illustrator (born 1957)

- Born: 1957 (age 68–69)
- Education: University of London
- Writing career
- Notable works: Pizza Kittens; Ginger

Charlotte Voake (born 1957) is a Welsh children's illustrator who has won several awards including the Nestlé Smarties Book Prize in 1997.

== Life and career ==
Voake was born and raised in Wales. She studied art history at the University of London where she also illustrated her first book. She has both written and illustrated her own books and illustrated books for other authors including Julia Donaldson.

Voake lives in Surrey, England with her husband and two children.

== Works ==
=== Books written and illustrated by Voake ===
- Tom's Cat (1986)
- Mrs. Goose's Baby (1989)
- The Three Little Pigs, and Other Favorite Nursery Stories (1991)
- Mr. Davies and the Baby (1996)
- Ginger (1997)
- Here Comes the Train (1998)
- Alphabet Adventure (2000)
- Pizza Kittens (2002)
- Ginger Finds a Home (2003)
- Tweedle Dee Dee (2008)
- Ginger and the Mystery Visitor (2013)
- Melissa's Octopus and Other Unsuitable Pets (2015)
- Some Dinosaurs are Small (2020)

== Awards and nominations ==
- 1989 – National Art Library Illustration Award for The Mighty Slide
- 1997 – Nestlé Smarties Book Prize for Ginger
- 2002 – Smarties Book Prize Silver Award for Pizza Kittens

Voake has also been shortlisted for the Kurt Maschler Award in 1988, 1991, 1993 and 1997.
