= Ginger and the Mystery Visitor =

Children's picture book by Charlotte Voake

- Author: Charlotte Voake
- Illustrator: Charlotte Voake
- Language: English
- Genre: Children's picture book
- Published: 2010 (Walker Books)
- Publication place: England
- Media type: Print (hardback)
- Pages: 40 (unpaginated)
- ISBN: 9781406322385
- OCLC: 1158350581
- Preceded by: Ginger Finds a Home

Ginger and the Mystery Visitor is a 2010 children's picture book by Charlotte Voake. It is about an unknown cat that makes itself at home at Ginger and Kitten's house, including, to their shock, eating their dinner, but is then found to be a much loved cat called Tiddles who then goes elsewhere.

== Reception ==
A review in School Library Journal of Ginger and the Mystery Visitor wrote "The minimalist yet highly expressive watercolor and ink illustrations are set against white pages, keeping the focus on the characters.", and concluded "This is a gentle book to share either in a group setting or, especially, one-on-one.". The Children's Bookwatch called it ".. a delightful cat story that contains a hidden moral or two that even a child of 6 can figure out in time.".

Ginger and the Mystery Visitor has also been reviewed by Horn Book Guides, and Booktrust.

== See also ==
- Six-dinner Sid
