= Jacqueline Wilson bibliography =

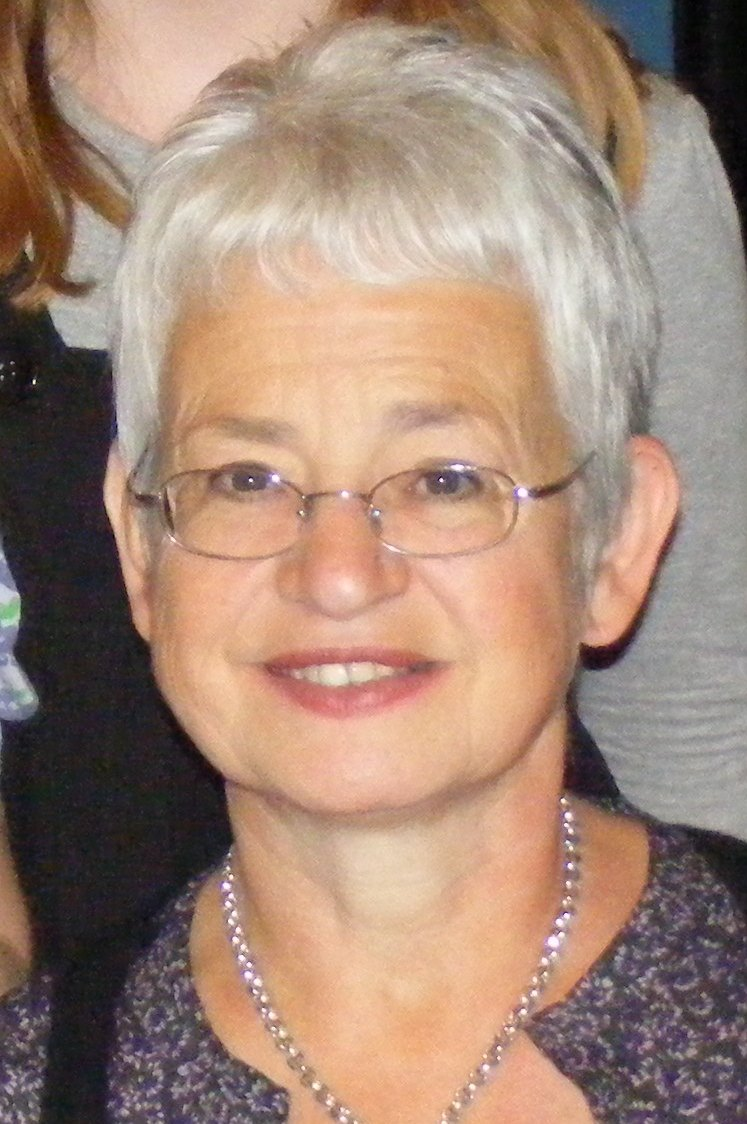
Jacqueline Wilson in 2009.

The following is a complete list of books published by Dame Jacqueline Wilson, an English novelist who writes for children's literature. Four of her books appear in the BBC's The Big Read poll of the 100 most popular books in the UK, and for her lifetime contribution as a children's writer, Wilson was a UK nominee for the international Hans Christian Andersen Award in 2014. Wilson is the author of many book series; her Tracy Beaker series, inaugurated in 1991 with The Story of Tracy Beaker, includes three sequels and has been adapted into six CBBC television series: The Story of Tracy Beaker, Tracy Beaker Returns, The Dumping Ground, The Tracy Beaker Survival Files, My Mum Tracy Beaker and The Beaker Girls. As of 2025, Wilson has written over 100 novels.

== Series ==
=== Stevie Day ===
Year	Title	Ref.
1987	Supersleuth	
1987	Lonely Hearts	
1988	Rat Race	
1988	Stevie Day - Vampire	

=== Is There Anybody There? ===
Year	Title	Ref.
1989	Spirit Raising	
1990	Crystal Gazing	

=== The Werepuppy ===
Year	Title	Ref.
1991	The Werepuppy	
1994	The Werepuppy Goes on Holiday	

=== Tracy Beaker ===
Year	Title	Ref.
1991	The Story of Tracy Beaker	
2000	The Dare Game	
2006	Starring Tracy Beaker	
2009	Tracy Beaker's Thumping Heart	
2009	The Tracy Beaker Quiz Book	
2012	The Tracy Beaker Trilogy (Note: The Tracy Beaker Trilogy contains The Story of Tracy Beaker, The Dare Game and Starring Tracy Beaker.)	
2014	Ask Tracy Beaker and Friends	
2018	My Mum Tracy Beaker	
2019	We Are the Beaker Girls	

=== Mark Spark ===
Year	Title	Ref.
1992	Mark Spark	
1993	Mark Spark in the Dark	

=== Freddy's Teddy ===
Year	Title	Ref.
1994	Come Back Teddy!	
1994	Freddy's Teddy	
1994	Teddy Goes Swimming	
1994	Teddy at the Fair	

=== Twin Tales ===
Year	Title	Ref.
1994	Twin Trouble	
1996	Connie and the Water Babies	

=== Biscuit Barrel ===
Year	Title	Ref.
1995	Cliffhanger	
1998	Buried Alive!	
2001	Biscuit Barrel (Note: Biscuit Barrel contains Cliffhanger and Buried Alive!.)	

=== Girls ===
Year	Title	Ref.
1997	Girls in Love	
1998	Girls Under Pressure	
1999	Girls out Late	
2002	Girls in Tears	
2024	Think Again	

=== The Illustrated Mum ===
Year	Title	Ref.
1999	The Illustrated Mum	
2025	Picture Imperfect	

=== Sleepovers ===
Year	Title	Ref.
2001	Sleepovers	
2023	The Best Sleepover in the World	
2025	The Seaside Sleepover	

=== Hetty Feather ===
Year	Title	Ref.
2009	Hetty Feather	
2011	Sapphire Battersea	
2012	Emerald Star	
2013	Diamond	
2015	Little Stars	
2017	Hetty Feather's Christmas	

=== World of Hetty Feather ===
Year	Title	Ref.
2016	Clover Moon	
2018	Rose Rivers	

== Standalone novels ==
Year	Title	Ref.
1969	Ricky's Birthday (Note: In the Nippers series.)	
1972	Hide and Seek	
1973	Truth or Dare	
1974	Snap	
1976	Let's Pretend	
1977	Holiday with Guns	
1977	Making Hate	
1982	Nobody's Perfect	
1983	Waiting for the Sky to Fall	
1984	The Killer Tadpole	
1984	The Other Side	
1984	The School Trip	
1985	How to Survive Summer Camp	
1986	Amber	
1986	The Monster in the Cupboard	
1987	The Power of the Shade	
1987	Glubbslyme	
1988	This Girl	
1989	Falling Apart	
1989	The Left Outs	
1989	The Party in the Lift	
1990	Take A Good Look	
1991	The Dream Palace	
1992	The Suitcase Kid	
1992	Video Rose	
1993	Deep Blue	
1993	The Mum Minder	
1994	The Bed and Breakfast Star (Note: The Bed and Breakfast Star was originally published as Elsa, Star of the Shelter.)	
1995	The Dinosaur's Packed Lunch	
1995	Double Act	
1995	Jimmy Jelly	
1995	Love from Katy	
1995	My Brother Bernadette	
1995	Sophie's Secret Diary	
1996	Bad Girls	
1996	Beauty and the Beast	
1996	Mr. Cool	
1997	The Lottie Project	
1997	The Monster Story-Teller	
1998	Rapunzel	
1999	Monster Eyeballs	
2000	Lizzie Zipmouth	
2000	Vicky Angel	
2001	The Cat Mummy	
2001	Dustbin Baby	
2002	Secrets	
2002	The Worry Website	
2003	Lola Rose	
2004	Midnight	
2004	Best Friends	
2004	The Diamond Girls	
2005	Clean Break	
2005	Love Lessons	
2006	Candyfloss	
2007	Kiss	
2008	My Sister Jodie	
2008	Cookie	
2010	Little Darlings	
2010	The Longest Whale Song	
2011	Lily Alone	
2011	Green Glass Beads	
2012	The Worst Thing About My Sister	
2012	Big Day Out	
2013	Queenie	
2012	Four Children and It	
2014	Paws and Whiskers	
2014	Opal Plumstead	
2015	The Butterfly Club	
2015	Katy	
2016	Rent a Bridesmaid	
2017	Wave Me Goodbye	
2019	Dancing the Charleston	
2020	Love Frankie	
2021	The Runaway Girls	
2021	The Primrose Railway Children	
2022	Baby Love	
2023	Project Fairy	
2023	The Other Edie Trimmer	
2024	The Girl Who Wasn't There	
2024	Star of the Show	
2026	Esme Pepper	

== Non-fiction works ==
Year	Title	Notes	Ref.
2002	The Jacqueline Wilson Quiz Book	Trivia and quiz book	
2005	The World of Jacqueline Wilson	Information book	
2007	Jacky Daydream	Autobiography	
2007	Totally Jacqueline Wilson	Activity book	
2010	My Secret Diary	Autobiography	
2011	My Summer Holiday Journal	Journal	
2016	The Jacqueline Wilson Colouring Book	Colouring book	
