= The Cat Mummy =

2001 novel by Jacqueline Wilson

- Updated edition cover
- Author: Jacqueline Wilson
- Illustrator: Nick Sharratt
- Cover artist: Nick Sharratt
- Language: English
- Genre: Children's novel
- Publisher: Doubleday; Corgi Yearling
- Publication date: March 2001
- Publication place: United Kingdom
- Media type: Print and audiobook
- Pages: 96
- ISBN: 9780440865421

The Cat Mummy is a children's novel written by Jacqueline Wilson and illustrated by Nick Sharratt. It was originally published in March 2001 by Doubleday and an updated edition with a foreword by Wilson was released in 2009. The plot revolves around a girl named Verity who mummifies her dead cat. Wilson decided to write the novel as she believed that the death of a pet can be upsetting for readers. The novel has been praised by critics for its portrayal of death and bereavement, although some critics found the plot to be peculiar.

== Premise ==
Verity lives with her father and grandparents, who struggle to talk about the loss of Verity's mother, who died when Verity was born. Verity then is devastated when her cat Mabel dies. As she is learning about Ancient Egypt in school, Verity decides to mummify her cat and keeps it hidden from her family, using bath salts to keep the smell away. When Verity's family find out what has happened, this prompts the family to begin to talk about death.

== Development ==
The Cat Mummy was written by children's author Jacqueline Wilson and illustrated by Nick Sharratt; the pair had worked together since the publication of The Story of Tracy Beaker in 1991. The novel was originally published by Doubleday in March 2001. An updated version was released in March 2009 with a foreword from Wilson that discussed her inspiration for writing the novel. Wilson tends to write for children between the ages of 7 and 14, with The Cat Mummy being recommended for readers at the lower end of that range. The novel includes the theme of bereavement and dealing with loss. Wilson revealed that she decided to write about the death of a pet as realised that that experience is upsetting for many children and she would receive letters from her fans telling her that their pets had died, which made her feel sad. Although Wilson considered The Cat Mummy to be a "sad story", she said that it had a happy ending and featured humorous moments too. Wilson reread the novel when her own cat died, which made her feel comforted.

== Reception ==
Miriam Moore from The Spinoff ranked The Cat Mummy as second best on her ranked list of the 30 Jacqueline Wilson books that she had read, noting that she told Wilson that her own cat died when she met her at a book signing. Moore also noted that the book inspired her to ask for bath salts due to Verity using them in the story to hide the smell of her dead cat. Ella Dove from Good Housekeeping placed The Cat Mummy on her list of the 10 best Jacqueline Wilson books, believing that whilst it had a peculiar premise, "this endearing book tackles the important topics of love and loss in an accessible and unique way." The book had average ratings of 4 out of 5 stars on the Summer Reading Challenge website. Hanifah Rahman from BuzzFeed included the novel in her article discussing how dark Wilson's books were, writing, "I feel like this one is very much overlooked among Jacqueline's whole collection, but when you think about it, a kid embalming their dead cat is really quite disturbing", and she opined that Mabel's "devoted and caring" father and grandparents were "kinda boring". Rebecca Reid from Metro included the novel on her ranked list of Wilson's books from most to least depressing, ranking it as the 13th depressing out of 21 of her novels, adding, "A child tried to mummify her cat. 'Nuff said." The themes of death and grief in the novel were discussed in an essay by Isabelle Larrivée, who drew comparison between Mabel's death and the death of Verity's mother.

A writer from BookTrust called the novel a "deceptively simple tale which explores the issue of bereavement for younger readers", noting that "As well as focusing on the trauma of a family pet dying, Wilson also examines the fact that the family never really came to terms with the death of Verity's mother". Express on Sunday called the novel funny and "touching". The novel was described as "Both hilarious and poignant" and a "sure-fire hit" by The Scotsman, whilst Financial Times praised the way that loss was portrayed in the novel. A writer from The Bookseller praised the novel for not trivialising the emotions portrayed in the story, calling it a "touching and sad situation" which was dealt "with a light touch". Wilson's portrayal of bereavement was also praised by TES, who opined that the author "economically and entertainingly embraced life's highs and lows". A writer from The Daily Telegraph opined that the novel dealt with the "common first experience of mortality", noting that Verity mummifies her cat "in a bid to stave off what she knows but cannot acknowledge". The writer believed that Wilson's "off-kilter humour and irreverent, taboo-breaking energy" set the book apart from "earnest 'problem' books". Mary Trim discussed the novel in her book Growing and Knowing: A Selection Guide for Children's Literature, noting how Wilson "sensitively" considers Verity's mother's death "told in conjunction" to the death of Mabel. Trim observed that the family accepted one death by coming to terms with the other. A reviewer from Reading Time observed that Mabel's death was the "catalyst" for the family to "work through" their grief of Mabel and Verity's mum. They also opined that Wilson is able to "weave important lessons" about life and friendship "with real appeal to younger readers" and noted that Sharratt's "simple line drawings attractively supplement the text".
