= Queenie (Wilson novel) =

2013 novel by Jacqueline Wilson

- Author: Jacqueline Wilson
- Illustrator: Nick Sharratt
- Language: English
- Genre: Children's novel
- Publisher: Penguin Random House
- Publication date: 31 January 2013
- Publication place: United Kingdom
- Media type: Print (hardback, Ebook & paperback) and audiobook
- Pages: 416
- ISBN: 978-0857531117

Queenie is a 2013 children's novel written by Jacqueline Wilson and illustrated by Nick Sharratt. It was published in January 2013. The novel is set in 1953 and revolves around Elsie Kettle, who gets hospitalised with tuberculosis. In the children's ward that she is staying at, she makes friends with the other children and the hospital cat, Queenie. The novel received positive reviews.

== Premise ==
Set in England in 1953, Elsie Kettle lives with her grandmother and she is excited to go to London for the coronation of Elizabeth II. However, they both are hospitalised with tuberculosis. Confined to her hospital bed in a strict children's ward for months, Elsie makes friends with the other children and Queenie, the hospital's white cat. Elsie then becomes well enough to leave the hospital but has a special and unexpected visitor.

== Development ==
Queenie was written by Dame Jacqueline Wilson and illustrated by Nick Sharratt. The novel was originally released by Penguin Random House on 31 January 2013. A paperback version was released in December 2013. The novel is set in 1953, the year of the coronation of Elizabeth II. The novel is partially set in a children's ward of a hospital due to the protagonist having tuberculosis and showed the early years of the NHS. An official trailer for Queenie was released on 22 January 2013 on the official Jacqueline Wilson YouTube channel.

== Reception ==
A reviewer from The Book Nook rated the novel four out of five stars, calling it a "very good book" and opining that the novel "especially" good for people who love cats. They also praised Sharratt's illustrations and recommended it for readers aged 7 and older, and believed that fans of the novel would like Wilson's Hetty Feather series. Rebecca Hay from the Burnley Express called the novel "fanatastic". Kat Winter from The Guardian rated the book 9 out of 10 and said that she would recommend it to readers who "like sad but interesting stories set in the past". Winter added that they enjoyed Wilson's books as they always included a character with a "challenge that is hard to overcome". Another reviewer from The Guardian described Queenie as a "brilliant" and "moving, page-turning book" that "touched" their heart. The reviewer added, "Wilson's expertise at writing really shows in this passionate, heart-warming novel. I think that Jacqueline Wilson shows the bonds and friendship between animals and children really well". The book had an average rating of 5 out of 5 stars on the Summer Reading Challenge website. The book also had an average rating of 5 out of 5 stars on the Scholastics Book Club website for children. The Waterstones website showed an average rating of 4.5 out of 5 stars across four reviews.

Elizabeth Hawksley from the Historical Novel Society highly recommended the novel for girls over the age of seven, writing, "Jacqueline Wilson has the gift of being able to get inside a lonely child's head. We experience both Elsie's vulnerability and her pragmatism. She's matter of fact about her Mum and all the 'uncles' who come and go, but she's also liable to make mistakes through ignorance and misunderstanding which get her into trouble. An illegitimate child who lives with an ailing grandmother in poor circumstances is always going to be at a disadvantage, and Jacqueline Wilson doesn't pull her punches. But she also knows what's important: love. Elsie loves her Nan, and, in her absence, she comes to love Nurse Gabriel and Queenie". She also called Elsie's mother "entirely self-centred" and unreliable, and opined that Nurse Gabriel was very kind. In 2022, Kathryn Hughes from The Guardian put Queenie on her list of books that threw "unexpected light" on Elizabeth II. Hughes wrote that Wilson used "the thrill and glamour of the coronation as a counterpoint to a portrait of a children's hospital in the first years of the NHS. It is a touching reminder of how the world has changed since Elizabeth came to the throne".
