= Lily Alone =

2011 novel by Jacqueline Wilson

- First edition
- Author: Jacqueline Wilson
- Language: English
- Genre: Children's novel
- Published: 2011
- Publisher: Doubleday
- Publication date: 3 February 2011 (hardcover); 2 January 2012 (paperback)
- Publication place: United Kingdom
- Preceded by: The Longest Whale Song
- Followed by: The Worst Thing About My Sister

Lily Alone is a 2011 novel by best-selling author Jacqueline Wilson and illustrated by Nick Sharratt. It was first published in February of that year.

== Plot summary ==
Lily Green is the eldest child of the Green family, with two younger half-sisters (Bliss and Pixie), and one younger half-brother (Baxter). Though very responsible, Lily often resents having to take care of her siblings when her mother, Kate Green, goes out– usually to the pub, newsagent or off-licence. One night their mother meets Gordon, her new boyfriend, at a local club. Kate is convinced that her life will improve and she feels as though she and Gordon "were on a roller-coaster up to heaven." That night, Lily takes care of her brother and sisters by drawing and watching Peter Pan. The next day, Kate takes her children on a frivolous shopping expedition and uses a credit card, which she had supposedly been sold by a friend. This makes Lily suspicious about where and when her mother had really obtained the card.

Kate flies to Spain to be with Gordon. Lily is fearful and angry when her mother suggests that Mikey, Kate's ex-husband, look after the rest of the family while Kate travels to Spain. Kate tells Lily that she has yet to reveal to Gordon that she has children. She further annoys Lily when Kate reveals that she feels as if she deserves a holiday from living in a "dump." Kate leaves a voicemail message for Mikey to tell him that he must take care of the children while Kate is on holiday. Lily is afraid of Mikey. By the time Mikey returns Kate's call, Kate has already left for Spain. Mikey tells Lily that he is on his way to Glasgow and tells her to tell her mother not to go anywhere. Due to Lily's dislike of Mikey, Lily pretends that she has delivered the message when in fact the children are now alone.

For the next few days Lily looks after and entertains her younger siblings but she does not go to school as she does not trust the younger children to keep the fact the children are home alone secret. The children feed themselves by eating what is left in the fridge. Lily is able to prepare simple meals for her siblings because she has grown accustomed to caring for them. Lily is frightened and stressed because she is the one who is in charge. She is fearful that people will find out about her situation and that she will be taken into care and separated from her siblings. She uses a variety of methods to entertain her brother and sisters including taking them to a park the children have not gone to before. She also tries to deal with adults who ask about the whereabouts of her mother, such as a retired couple the children encounter in the park.

Mr Abbott, Lily's teacher, comes to the flat because he is concerned that the children have not attended school and that Lily failed to go on a trip to the art gallery. Lily tells her teacher that they have all been ill and that her mother is at the shops to purchase medicine. By this time "Old Kath", a neighbour in the flats, has also become suspicious of what's going on with the children. Lily is scared that Mr Abbott will return with social workers so she packs food, clothing and bedding and tells the others that they are going to camp in the park. The children run away to the park but have no tent or money; they plan to feed themselves. They feed themselves by stealing leftover food from a nearby cafe. Lily also steals food from a large house such as apples, strawberries, plums, peaches, a chicken breast, and yogurt.

Lily goes back to the flat to check if Kate has returned but the flat is still empty. She is caught by Old Kath and runs back to the park. She goes to the fish and chip shop, where the server is kind to her, giving her free food. The next morning, Bliss plays "Monkeys" with Baxter, but breaks her leg by falling down from their tree. Lily gets help from a lady and she calls an ambulance and Bliss is taken to hospital. Kate arrives at the hospital worried about Bliss. Kate is taken to the police station and is due to be charged with fraud. It seems probable she will also be charged with child neglect. Lily goes to a children's home, split apart from her siblings Baxter, Bliss, and Pixie who were fostered (by the same family), while Bliss stays in the hospital. The story ends, sadly, with Lily drawing a picture of the Green family and writing at the bottom: "We're all going to be together very, very soon." It remains unknown whether Lily and her siblings left care and went back to their mum.

== Characters ==
=== The Green Family ===
Lily Green: Lily narrates the novel in first person. She is the eldest of the Green children and takes care of her siblings much of the time. She is 11 years old. Although she likes taking care of her siblings, she uses her vivid imagination to play a 'Lily Alone' game where she fantasizes that she lives alone in a big white house with beautiful rooms. She views it as being as 'pristine as a palace' – a palace which she will design all by herself. She uses an expensive drawing pad, purchased by her mother, upon which to draw. Lily is patient, gentle and responsible, but her mother uses her as a nanny and leaves her alone with Baxter, Bliss and Pixie most nights to go to the club and drink. Lily loves her mother so much she does not realise that her mother is a failure as a parent for leaving her children alone and will often breakdown crying due to the pressure of responsibility. At the end of the book she is put into a care home apart from her siblings and mother, but believes that they will all be together soon. What happened to Lily is later revealed in the book My Mum Tracy Beaker, when she is fostered by Cam. It is also revealed that Lily went back to live with her mum, although It is unknown what happened to her siblings, or if they stayed with their foster family after she left foster care.

Bliss Green: Lily's six-year-old half-sister who barely utters a word. She treasures 'Headless,' a white polar bear toy that lost its head in an unfortunate accident. She loves the fairy-tale Cinderella and begs Lily to read it to her. Bliss is the perfect model of a sweet, shy little girl who has a very intense love for the things around her, but finds difficulty in expressing herself properly or making herself heard over the constant noise of Lily trying to keep the kids in order, Baxter swearing and shouting and Pixie screaming for ice cream and chippies. She loves to talk with Lily when she is alone. Like Lily, she is a loner, preferring to be on her own. Other children her age are loud and boisterous, making Bliss stick out in class; however, her twin brother Baxter sticks up for her. She does not like school because of this and has doubts about her mum's ability to look after her children properly but keeps all her thoughts to herself. She has an irritating phobia of beetles and germs, finds it difficult to cope with normal social life and to stop her dominating twin brother from walking all over her, and adores her big sister Lily. At the end of the story Bliss is taken to the hospital when she has a terrible accident in the park and breaks her leg after playing ' monkeys'. It's likely she went to the foster home Pixie & Baxter were staying at after being discharged from hospital.

Baxter Green: Lily's six-year-old half-brother and Bliss's twin. Baxter acts like his father, Mikey. He is the only boy of the Green family, and his favourite role model, the man he worships and adores, is his father. He cuts his hair short to look as much like Mikey as he can, he prefers to act tough and emphasises his toughness to the limit, such as swearing, swaggering like his dad, and being obsessed with killing, to the point where he has difficulty admitting when he is really afraid or upset. He quenches his feelings by teasing his sister, but shows he loves her when she breaks her leg. He is fostered by a couple along with Pixie at the end of the book. His favourite toy is a fork lift truck, which Kate purchases with a credit card.

Pixie Green: Kate's youngest child, and the baby of the Green family. A sweet, cheeky, talkative three year old who is favoured by her mum and many others. Lily loves her dearly but feels constantly pressured by her and Baxter's endless demands for things that they want and can't have. Kate spoils her to keep her quiet. Pixie also loves ice-cream. Lily complains that she talks too much.

Mum/Kate Green: She is the 26-year-old mother of the Green family. She has had all of her children with different fathers - none of which she is still with. She had Lily when she was 15 and was very close to her. She then had Baxter, Bliss and Pixie with her ex-boyfriends Mikey and Paul. When she was with Paul she fell into a lot of debt, and eventually stole a credit card to try to deal with her financial difficulties. She was tried in a magistrates' court but was let off with a fine after 'acting dumb'. Even though she didn't like Paul much, she fell into depression after he died, and soon after lost her job at a canteen and stayed at home smoking. If she is not with a man, she seems to act depressed. Lily feels that her mum often drinks too much and feels that she has been shouldered with too much responsibility in terms of taking care of her siblings. Lily's mum has long hair and she enjoys dressing up in tight clothing and wearing high heels. She went on holiday to Spain with Gordon, her new boyfriend, leaving all of her children alone to fend for themselves. She often uses her eldest daughter as a "nanny", as Old Kath states, to look after the younger children.

=== Other characters ===
Mr. Abbott: Lily's favourite teacher who wanted Lily to come to the art gallery on a school trip, but Lily didn't go because she could not leave her siblings alone. She adores him because he takes an active interest in her and never makes her feel silly like her other teachers do. He calls social services after becoming worried about the children but soon asks her to forgive him since he greatly regrets it.

Arnie and Elizabeth: An elderly couple who were teachers before they retired, Arnie was a History teacher and Elizabeth was a PE teacher. When Lily and her siblings were in the park Elizabeth offered them Polos and walked with them to the park gates before Lily claimed to have seen her mother and ran away with the younger children.

Jenny and Jan: Friends of Lily's mum. They used to work with Lily's mum in a canteen. She met up with them when she went clubbing when she left Lily alone to look after her brother and sisters. It is Jenny who 'sold' her a credit card in the book. Jenny and Jan are briefly mentioned in the book.

Gordon: Mum's new boyfriend who is nineteen years old. They travel together to Spain. Mum claims that there is a seven-year age difference between the two of them. Gordon works at his uncle's nightclub in Spain. According to Mum, Gordon is a rich young man. He finds out that she has children when Kate went to Spain with him, causing Kate to leave him, to which Gordon pays for her flight back.

Old Kath: A mad old woman who lives next-door to the Green family. According to Lily, Kath uses too much black hair dye, so her hair is falling out. She also wears too much bright red lipstick. Lily does not like her very much because Kath says mean things about Lily's mum behind her back.

Mikey: Bliss and Baxter's dad. Lily describes him as being a big, fat and ugly man. Lily also detests Mikey because he has a scary dog called Rex who bit Bliss on her hand. She feels that Mikey does not like her very much either because Mikey always accuses Lily of staring at him. During the story, Mikey also went to Scotland not knowing the children were alone.

Paul: Kate's second husband who is "thin and tweedy". He died shortly before the start of the book. He never cared about her or Pixie, his daughter, and always lied on the sofa. He also took drugs until he died, making Kate feel depressed.

Sarah: A girl in Lily's class at school who comes round to see if she is still coming to the school art gallery trip the next day.

== Critical response ==
The book was described in a review in the Guardian as "A truly brilliant addition to any girl's book-shelf". A review in the National Post recommended the book for "female adolescents aged eight to 13".
