= The Butterfly Club (novel) =

2015 novel by Jacqueline Wilson

- Author: Jacqueline Wilson
- Illustrator: Nick Sharratt
- Language: English
- Genre: Children's novel
- Publisher: Penguin Random House
- Publication date: 12 February 2015
- Publication place: United Kingdom
- Media type: Print (hardback, Ebook & paperback) and audiobook
- Pages: 400
- ISBN: 978-0552569934

The Butterfly Club is a 2015 children's novel written by Jacqueline Wilson and illustrated by Nick Sharratt. It was published in February 2015. It is Wilson's 101st book. The plot revolves around seven-year old Tina, who is smaller than her two triplet siblings. When Tina starts junior school, she is sat separate to her sister despite their mothers request and her new teacher makes her sit next to mean girl Selma, who Tina is afraid of. The pair later become friends when creating a butterfly garden together. Wilson said that the novel's themes include confidence, friendships and independence, and she hoped that readers would be able to learn about butterflies through the novel. Wilson enjoyed writing the novel and said that she had been fascinated by the theme of sibling relationships. The cover for the novel was revealed in November 2014 and a recreation of the cover made out of Loom bands was auctioned to raise money for charity. The Butterfly Club received positive reviews from critics and was the seventh most borrowed children's fiction book borrowed from Surrey's 52 libraries between April 2015 and March 2016. Wilson later wrote a sequel, Butterfly Beach, for World Book Day 2017.

== Premise ==
Seven-year-old Tina is the youngest and smallest of her three triplet sisters due to a disease that she had when she was born. She must learn to manage without the protection of her sisters at their new school when their new teacher, "super-strict" Miss Lovejoy, wants to make her more independent and makes her sit next to Selma, who initially bullies her. Miss Lovejoy asks Tina and Selma to create a butterfly garden together and the pair end up becoming friends.

== Development and release ==
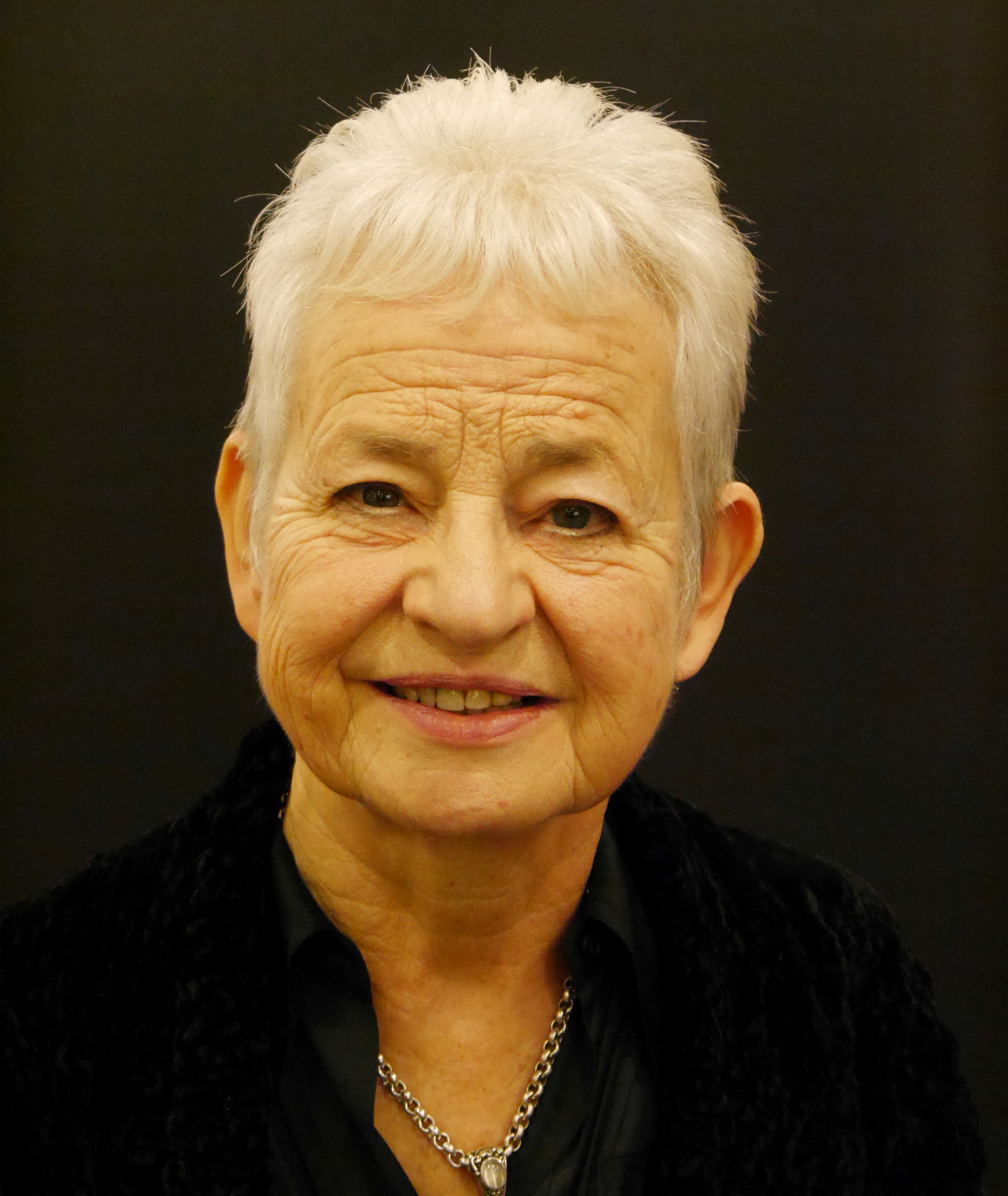
Jacqueline Wilson wrote the novel

The Butterfly Club was written by Jacqueline Wilson and illustrated by Nick Sharratt. The Butterfly Club is Wilson's 101st book. It is one of three books that she published in 2015, the other two being Katy and Little Stars. Wilson's previous novel, Opal Plumstead, was a "long serious story set in Edwardian times", so Wilson decided to slightly "change tack" by writing a contemporary work aimed at readers aged six to ten, which she described as being an "important" age group. Wilson said that she found writing the novel "fun".

Wilson described the novel's plot as "a story about starting in the juniors, learning to stand on your own two feet and making friends with your No.1 enemy", in addition to addressing the topics of being a sister, confidence and having a "scary" teacher. The Butterfly Club revolves around triplet sisters; being an only child, Wilson had been "fascinated" by the relationships between siblings and her previous children's book Double Act revolved around twins Ruby and Garnet, who feature at the end of the plot of The Butterfly Club. Wilson teased that readers would be able to find out about the twins now being adults. Wilson also revealed that the novel had a "Green theme" and hoped that readers would be able to learn a lot about butterflies by reading the novel. Reviewers have also noted the theme of standing up for yourself. The end of the book has bonus features including puzzles, facts about butterflies and instructions on how to make a loom band butterfly.

The cover for the book was revealed on 8 November 2014 at the Waterstones bookshop in Piccadilly, London. During the reveal, the cover was recreated using 7,500 Loom bands by loom artist Samantha Baird, which took three weeks to create. Loom bands play a part in the novel's plot. After being on display for two weeks, the loom band cover was auctioned off to raise money for charity. A trailer for the novel was published on the official Jacqueline Wilson YouTube channel on 30 January 2015. The novel was released in hardcover on 12 February 2015. A paperback version was published in December 2015.

== Reception ==
The Butterfly Club was the seventh most borrowed Children's fiction book borrowed from Surrey's 52 libraries between April 2015 and March 2016, having been borrowed 1,786 times over that period and contributing to the highest amount of fiction books borrowed from Surrey libraries in over 10 years. The book had an average rating of 5 out of 5 stars on the Summer Reading Challenge website, receiving positive reviews from users. The book also had an average rating of 5 out of 5 stars on the Scholastics Book Club website for children. Lucy Mangan from The Guardian opined that the novel "fits neatly" into Wilson's "template" for her novels of "contemporary children dealing with contemporary problems". Charlotte Seager from the same newspaper called the novel a "heartwarming read" and reported that Guardian readers enjoyed how the plot was very "character-driven". The Guardian published a number of reviews from young readers, who rated the book highly and praised the plot, pace and characters of the novel.

== Sequel ==
Wilson later wrote a sequel, Butterfly Beach, for World Book Day 2017 as one of the event's ten £1 books. The plot of the sequel revolves around Selma going on holiday with her sisters and Tina, where she begins to feel left out. Discussing the sequel, Wilson said, "My story is told from the point of view of the bad girl from The Butterfly Club. The difficult girl. It was rather fun to take over the personality of the big, scary one—I was the little, weedy one. And even though it's a smaller story, you'll find out exactly why the poor girl is so difficult". Butterfly Beach was also illustrated by Sharratt.
