= The Big Read =

Survey on books carried out by the BBC in the United Kingdom in 2003

The Big Read was a survey on books that was carried out by the BBC in the United Kingdom in 2003, when over 700 thousand votes were received from the British public to find the nation's best-loved novel. The year-long survey was the biggest single test of public reading taste to date, and culminated with several programmes hosted by celebrities advocating their favourite books.

== Purpose ==
The BBC started the Big Read with the goal of finding the "Nation's Best-loved Novel" by way of a viewer vote via the Web, SMS, and telephone. The show attracted controversy for adopting an allegedly sensationalist approach to literature, but supporters praised it for raising the public awareness of reading. The British public voted originally for any novel that they wished. From this, a list of 200 was drawn up, with the highest 21 then put forward for further voting, on the provision that only one book per author was permitted in the top 21. As the poll was based on novels, the plays of William Shakespeare were not part of the survey.

== Top 200 novels in the United Kingdom ==
1. The Lord of the Rings by J. R. R. Tolkien
2. Pride and Prejudice by Jane Austen
3. His Dark Materials by Philip Pullman
4. The Hitchhiker's Guide to the Galaxy by Douglas Adams
5. Harry Potter and the Goblet of Fire by J. K. Rowling
6. To Kill a Mockingbird by Harper Lee
7. Winnie-the-Pooh by A. A. Milne
8. Nineteen Eighty-Four by George Orwell
9. The Lion, the Witch and the Wardrobe by C. S. Lewis
10. Jane Eyre by Charlotte Brontë
11. Catch-22 by Joseph Heller
12. Wuthering Heights by Emily Brontë
13. Birdsong by Sebastian Faulks
14. Rebecca by Daphne du Maurier
15. The Catcher in the Rye by J. D. Salinger
16. The Wind in the Willows by Kenneth Grahame
17. Great Expectations by Charles Dickens
18. Little Women by Louisa May Alcott
19. Captain Corelli's Mandolin by Louis de Bernières
20. War and Peace by Leo Tolstoy
21. Gone with the Wind by Margaret Mitchell
22. Harry Potter and the Philosopher's Stone by J. K. Rowling
23. Harry Potter and the Chamber of Secrets by J. K. Rowling
24. Harry Potter and the Prisoner of Azkaban by J. K. Rowling
25. The Hobbit by J. R. R. Tolkien
26. Tess of the d'Urbervilles by Thomas Hardy
27. Middlemarch by George Eliot
28. A Prayer for Owen Meany by John Irving
29. The Grapes of Wrath by John Steinbeck
30. Alice's Adventures in Wonderland by Lewis Carroll
31. The Story of Tracy Beaker by Jacqueline Wilson
32. One Hundred Years of Solitude by Gabriel García Márquez
33. The Pillars of the Earth by Ken Follett
34. David Copperfield by Charles Dickens
35. Charlie and the Chocolate Factory by Roald Dahl
36. Treasure Island by Robert Louis Stevenson
37. A Town Like Alice by Nevil Shute
38. Persuasion by Jane Austen
39. Dune by Frank Herbert
40. Emma by Jane Austen
41. Anne of Green Gables by Lucy Maud Montgomery
42. Watership Down by Richard Adams
43. The Great Gatsby by F. Scott Fitzgerald
44. The Count of Monte Cristo by Alexandre Dumas
45. Brideshead Revisited by Evelyn Waugh
46. Animal Farm by George Orwell
47. A Christmas Carol by Charles Dickens
48. Far from the Madding Crowd by Thomas Hardy
49. Goodnight Mister Tom by Michelle Magorian
50. The Shell Seekers by Rosamunde Pilcher
51. The Secret Garden by Frances Hodgson Burnett
52. Of Mice and Men by John Steinbeck
53. The Stand by Stephen King
54. Anna Karenina by Leo Tolstoy
55. A Suitable Boy by Vikram Seth
56. The BFG by Roald Dahl
57. Swallows and Amazons by Arthur Ransome
58. Black Beauty by Anna Sewell
59. Artemis Fowl by Eoin Colfer
60. Crime and Punishment by Fyodor Dostoyevsky
61. Noughts & Crosses by Malorie Blackman
62. Memoirs of a Geisha by Arthur Golden
63. A Tale of Two Cities by Charles Dickens
64. The Thorn Birds by Colleen McCullough
65. Mort by Terry Pratchett
66. The Magic Faraway Tree by Enid Blyton
67. The Magus by John Fowles
68. Good Omens by Neil Gaiman and Terry Pratchett
69. Guards! Guards! by Terry Pratchett
70. Lord of the Flies by William Golding
71. Perfume by Patrick Süskind
72. The Ragged-Trousered Philanthropists by Robert Tressell
73. Night Watch by Terry Pratchett
74. Matilda by Roald Dahl
75. Bridget Jones's Diary by Helen Fielding
76. The Secret History by Donna Tartt
77. The Woman in White by Wilkie Collins
78. Ulysses by James Joyce
79. Bleak House by Charles Dickens
80. Double Act by Jacqueline Wilson
81. The Twits by Roald Dahl
82. I Capture the Castle by Dodie Smith
83. Holes by Louis Sachar
84. Gormenghast by Mervyn Peake
85. The God of Small Things by Arundhati Roy
86. Vicky Angel by Jacqueline Wilson
87. Brave New World by Aldous Huxley
88. Cold Comfort Farm by Stella Gibbons
89. Magician by Raymond E. Feist
90. On the Road by Jack Kerouac
91. The Godfather by Mario Puzo
92. The Clan of the Cave Bear by Jean M. Auel
93. The Colour of Magic by Terry Pratchett
94. The Alchemist by Paulo Coelho
95. Katherine by Anya Seton
96. Kane and Abel by Jeffrey Archer
97. Love in the Time of Cholera by Gabriel García Márquez
98. Girls in Love by Jacqueline Wilson
99. The Princess Diaries by Meg Cabot
100. Midnight's Children by Salman Rushdie
101. Three Men in a Boat by Jerome K. Jerome
102. Small Gods by Terry Pratchett
103. The Beach by Alex Garland
104. Dracula by Bram Stoker
105. Point Blanc by Anthony Horowitz
106. The Pickwick Papers by Charles Dickens
107. Stormbreaker by Anthony Horowitz
108. The Wasp Factory by Iain Banks
109. The Day of the Jackal by Frederick Forsyth
110. The Illustrated Mum by Jacqueline Wilson
111. Jude the Obscure by Thomas Hardy
112. The Secret Diary of Adrian Mole, Aged 13¾ by Sue Townsend
113. The Cruel Sea by Nicholas Monsarrat
114. Les Misérables by Victor Hugo
115. The Mayor of Casterbridge by Thomas Hardy
116. The Dare Game by Jacqueline Wilson
117. Bad Girls by Jacqueline Wilson
118. The Picture of Dorian Gray by Oscar Wilde
119. Shōgun by James Clavell
120. The Day of the Triffids by John Wyndham
121. Lola Rose by Jacqueline Wilson
122. Vanity Fair by William Makepeace Thackeray
123. The Forsyte Saga by John Galsworthy
124. House of Leaves by Mark Z. Danielewski
125. The Poisonwood Bible by Barbara Kingsolver
126. Reaper Man by Terry Pratchett
127. Angus, Thongs and Full-Frontal Snogging by Louise Rennison
128. The Hound of the Baskervilles by Arthur Conan Doyle
129. Possession: A Romance by A. S. Byatt
130. The Master and Margarita by Mikhail Bulgakov
131. The Handmaid's Tale by Margaret Atwood
132. Danny, the Champion of the World by Roald Dahl
133. East of Eden by John Steinbeck
134. George's Marvellous Medicine by Roald Dahl
135. Wyrd Sisters by Terry Pratchett
136. The Color Purple by Alice Walker
137. Hogfather by Terry Pratchett
138. The Thirty-Nine Steps by John Buchan
139. Girls in Tears by Jacqueline Wilson
140. Sleepovers by Jacqueline Wilson
141. All Quiet on the Western Front by Erich Maria Remarque
142. Behind the Scenes at the Museum by Kate Atkinson
143. High Fidelity by Nick Hornby
144. It by Stephen King
145. James and the Giant Peach by Roald Dahl
146. The Green Mile by Stephen King
147. Papillon by Henri Charrière
148. Men at Arms by Terry Pratchett
149. Master and Commander by Patrick O'Brian
150. Skeleton Key by Anthony Horowitz
151. Soul Music by Terry Pratchett
152. Thief of Time by Terry Pratchett
153. The Fifth Elephant by Terry Pratchett
154. Atonement by Ian McEwan
155. Secrets by Jacqueline Wilson
156. The Silver Sword by Ian Serraillier
157. One Flew Over the Cuckoo's Nest by Ken Kesey
158. Heart of Darkness by Joseph Conrad
159. Kim by Rudyard Kipling
160. Cross Stitch by Diana Gabaldon
161. Moby-Dick by Herman Melville
162. River God by Wilbur Smith
163. Sunset Song by Lewis Grassic Gibbon
164. The Shipping News by E. Annie Proulx
165. The World According to Garp by John Irving
166. Lorna Doone by R. D. Blackmore
167. Girls Out Late by Jacqueline Wilson
168. The Far Pavilions by M. M. Kaye
169. The Witches by Roald Dahl
170. Charlotte's Web by E. B. White
171. Frankenstein by Mary Shelley
172. They Used to Play on Grass by Terry Venables and Gordon Williams
173. The Old Man and the Sea by Ernest Hemingway
174. The Name of the Rose by Umberto Eco
175. Sophie's World by Jostein Gaarder
176. Dustbin Baby by Jacqueline Wilson
177. Fantastic Mr Fox by Roald Dahl
178. Lolita by Vladimir Nabokov
179. Jonathan Livingston Seagull by Richard Bach
180. The Little Prince by Antoine de Saint-Exupéry
181. The Suitcase Kid by Jacqueline Wilson
182. Oliver Twist by Charles Dickens
183. The Power of One by Bryce Courtenay
184. Silas Marner by George Eliot
185. American Psycho by Bret Easton Ellis
186. The Diary of a Nobody by George and Weedon Grossmith
187. Trainspotting by Irvine Welsh
188. Goosebumps by R. L. Stine
189. Heidi by Johanna Spyri
190. Sons and Lovers by D. H. Lawrence
191. The Unbearable Lightness of Being by Milan Kundera
192. Man and Boy by Tony Parsons
193. The Truth by Terry Pratchett
194. The War of the Worlds by H. G. Wells
195. The Horse Whisperer by Nicholas Evans
196. A Fine Balance by Rohinton Mistry
197. Witches Abroad by Terry Pratchett
198. The Once and Future King by T. H. White
199. The Very Hungry Caterpillar by Eric Carle
200. Flowers in the Attic by V. C. Andrews

== Authors with multiple novels on the list ==
Multiple novels in the Top 25

In the first stage, all four extant Harry Potter novels by J. K. Rowling were among the 25 leaders. So were both Middle-earth novels by J. R. R. Tolkien. The second stage featured 21 books by distinct authors: the top 25 with Rowling represented only by her fourth volume, Goblet of Fire, and Tolkien only by The Lord of the Rings. Those two novels finally placed fifth and first; the other preliminary leaders by Rowling and Tolkien nominally led the also-rans in ranks 22–25.

Multiple novels in the Top 50

- Four: J. K. Rowling
- Three: Jane Austen, Charles Dickens
- Two: Thomas Hardy, George Orwell, J. R. R. Tolkien

Multiple novels in the Top 100

- Five: Charles Dickens, Terry Pratchett
- Four: Roald Dahl, J. K. Rowling, Jacqueline Wilson
- Three: Jane Austen
- Two: Thomas Hardy, Gabriel García Márquez, George Orwell, John Steinbeck, J. R. R. Tolkien, Leo Tolstoy

Multiple novels in the Top 200

- Fifteen: Terry Pratchett
- Fourteen: Jacqueline Wilson
- Nine: Roald Dahl
- Seven: Charles Dickens
- Four: Thomas Hardy, J. K. Rowling
- Three: Jane Austen, Anthony Horowitz, Stephen King, John Steinbeck
- Two: George Eliot, John Irving, Gabriel García Márquez, George Orwell, J. R. R. Tolkien, Leo Tolstoy

== Similar contests ==
Contests similar to the Big Read were conducted in other countries:

- My Favourite Book in Australia
- Das große Lesen in Germany
- A Nagy Könyv ("The Big Book") in Hungary
- Голямото четене ("The Big Read") in Bulgaria
- Lielā Lasīšana ("The Big Read") in Latvia
- The Great American Read

Other lists:

- Bokklubben World Library
- Le Monde's 100 Books of the Century
- Modern Library's 100 Best Novels
- Time's List of the 100 Best Novels
