= The Worry Website =

2002 novel by Jacqueline Wilson

- First edition cover design
- Author: Jacqueline Wilson; Lauren Roberts (chapter 6 "Lisa's Worry")
- Illustrator: Nick Sharratt
- Language: English
- Genre: Children's novel
- Publisher: Doubleday (first edition, hardback)
- Publication date: 5 June 2002 (first edition, paperback)
- Publication place: United Kingdom
- Media type: Print (hardback & paperback)
- Pages: 123 pp (first edition, hardback)

The Worry Website is a children's novel by Jacqueline Wilson published in 2002. It is illustrated by Nick Sharratt.

== Summary ==
There are seven stories about the children in a class taught by Mr. Speed at Mapleton Juniors, except the last story whose narrator named Natasha went to a special school for disabled children, but now she's in Mr. Speeds class.

The Worry Website was created by Mr. Speed as a replacement for circle time that can only be accessed via his classroom computer.

There were originally planned to be only six stories, with one being submitted by a fan through a competition. However, the winning entry by then 12-year-old Lauren Roberts, "Of Mums and Wizards" (Lisa's worry) ended so sadly that Wilson was motivated to write a seventh story to give the book a happier ending.

=== Holly: Worry 1 ===
This story was initially published on the Internet one year before the book's publication.

Holly lives with her cute younger sister Hannah and her father. She thinks Hannah's Reception class teacher, Miss Morgan, is going to be her stepmother, as she has started dating her father. Holly wishes that her stepmother will be wicked. Holly likes Miss Morgan, but when she finds out that her father is dating her, decides to loathe her. When they are dating, Holly spends more time with Miss Morgan, but never gives the teacher a chance to get on with her. Holly becomes foes with Miss Morgan, and then when they are going shopping together, Miss Morgan says she is getting sick of Holly behaving horrible to her. Then they both become best friends.

=== Greg: Worry 2 ===
Greg likes Holly, which makes Greg want to sit near Holly at the museum. However, Mr. Speed suspects Samantha is Greg's crush. Greg confesses his feelings to Holly at the museum, and Holly and Greg become girlfriend and boyfriend.

=== Claire: Worry 3 ===
Since she was a little girl, Claire has had nightmares after films so her mum has been very strict about what she watches. After watching the notorious 18-rated film The Monster, an extremely violent and gory film, she cannot get her mind off it when sleeping. Mr Speed gives her tips on how to get rid of her nightmares with her special skill, football, and the dream goes away. She then gets a dream about her and Mr Speed playing a game of football together and defeating the monster.

=== William: Worry 4 ===
William is very unintelligent in everything. Mr Speed gives him a prize for losing a spelling contest. Later Mr Speed tells a story about an eating contest he once won when he was at school, called the Enormous Mouthful Contest, and then the children have their own contest, and William wins it.

=== Samantha: Worry 5 ===
Samantha's dad left her family and went off with his girlfriend. She has been very sad since then. Also she feels unpopular. Mr Speed suggests gardening which later attracts William to her and they have fun gardening together.

=== Lisa: Worry 6 ===
Lisa's dad is an alcoholic and beats her mum up which makes Lisa very sad. This is the only story that does not have a resolution, with Lisa deciding not to put her real worry down and say she is starting to get spots instead. However, the final chapter (Natasha's worry) partly continues Lisa's story as well.

=== Natasha: Worry 7 ===
Natasha is disabled, uses a wheelchair and communicates via a voice machine. She wants to be in the school concert. She becomes friends with Lisa and they enter with a song about worries.
