= Rent a Bridesmaid =

2016 children's novel by Jacqueline Wilson

- Author: Jacqueline Wilson
- Illustrator: Nick Sharratt
- Cover artist: Nick Sharratt
- Language: English
- Genre: Children's novel
- Publisher: Doubleday; Yearling
- Publication date: 5 May 2016
- Publication place: United Kingdom
- Media type: Print and audiobook
- Pages: 384
- ISBN: 9780440870241

Rent a Bridesmaid is a children's novel written by Jacqueline Wilson and illustrated by Nick Sharratt. It was originally published on 5 May 2016 and a paperback version was released the following year. The novel revolves around a girl called Tilly who rents out her services to be a bridesmaid at weddings. Wilson wanted to reflect the popularity that weddings and wedding dresses had at the time and believed that the protagonist in the novel was imaginative but a bit possessive.

== Premise ==
Tilly lives with her father and wants her parents to get married, although it seems unlikely as they are not together as her mother left her father years prior. When Tilly's best friend Matty is asked to be a bridesmaid, Tilly decides to put an advert in the shop to advertise her service as a bridesmaid. She ends up receiving a reply and is a bridesmaid at several weddings, including an old woman and a male gay couple. Her father is initially hesitant but ends up support Tilly with her work at the weddings. Because of her service, Tilly ends up being featured on television. However, she is upset when she finds out that her father is dating her teacher, who she is very fond of. Tilly eventually accepts the relationship and comes to terms with the fact that her mother left their family.

== Development ==
Rent a Bridesmaid was written by Children's author Jacqueline Wilson and illustrated by Nick Sharratt. It is the 104th novel Wilson has written. Prior to the book's release, The Guardian revealed the cover on 16 February 2016, along with an extract from the novel. A trailer for the book was released on the official Jacqueline Wilson YouTube channel in April 2016. The novel was released on 5 May 2016. A paperback version was released in February 2017, published by Yearling. Rent a Bridesmaid includes themes of "finding family and friendship in all sorts of places". To promote the novel, Wilson travelled to several events to promote her book, including at Tyne Theatre and Opera House and Shrewsbury Bookfest, which she found exhausting but "lovely". Wilson also spoke about the novel at the Cardiff Children's Literature Festival in April 2016, where guests were able to take a copy of Rent a Bridesmaid despite it being two weeks prior to its official launch. The author said that she does not write her novels only for girls, but noted that Rent a Bridesmaid has a "pink cover and is about girls wanting and dreaming about being a bridesmaid and tomboys who aren't so keen".

The author believed that "most little girls dream" of being a bridesmaid and wearing a "beautiful dress", and that Tilly in the book puts her services for hire as she does not think that her dream will come true otherwise. Wilson said that she wanted to reflect the "current craze" for weddings, explaining, "Every time you switch on the telly there's a new reality programme about wedding dresses." Wilson believed that there were children who wanted to be bridesmaids but never have been able to, children who wanted to be one and have been able to, and children who do not want to be bridesmaids at all. Wilson herself never had the opportunity to be a bridesmaid but did not want to, and she believed that she would not have not been able to see anything as she would not have been able to wear her glasses. When asked by Chronicle Live if she got her inspiration for the book of the services of renting a bridesmaid online, Wilson said no and believed that Tilly in her book would likely "get about 20p". Wilson called Tilly imaginative but slightly possessive, explaining, "She lives with her dad because her mum has gone off and when her best friend at her new school gets another friend, she chips in like crazy. She doesn't realise your best friend can have another friend too and the world isn't going to fall in". The author revealed that the book had some sad bits but promised that there was a happy ending for Tilly. Wilson added that she sometimes is unsure of how the plots of her books will end and that it feels like her characters "take over".

== Reception ==
David Whetstone from Chronicle Live believed that the book would "cause a stir" among Wilson's fans. A reviewer from TES believed that the novel did not "disappoint" and enjoyed the "strong" theme of friendship in the novel, noting how Tilly and Matty were good friends despite being "real opposites". The reviewer also noted how their pupils enjoyed the novel and noted how boys also liked the book despite its themes. A reviewer from Libraries Ireland rated the book five stars and called it a "Total blast of fun!"
