= Jacky Daydream =

Autobiography by Jacqueline Wilson

- First edition cover
- Author: Jacqueline Wilson
- Illustrator: Nick Sharratt
- Language: English
- Genre: Autobiography
- Publisher: Doubleday
- Publication date: 1 March 2007
- Publication place: United Kingdom
- Media type: Print (Hardback and paperback)
- Pages: 307 pp (First edition, hardback)
- ISBN: 0-385-61015-7

Jacky Daydream is an autobiographical book about Jacqueline Wilson's childhood, first published in 2007.

The book is an autobiography written for children rather than adults and describes Wilson's childhood up until the age of 11.

The book's title refers to a nickname given to the author when she was at school. The teacher, Mr Branson (whom the children nicknamed Brandy Balls) would give all the children nicknames according to their character. Initially he called Wilson "Jacky Four-eyes" as she wore glasses. Subsequently he named her "Jacky Daydream" for staring out of the window during maths, a subject she hated.

== Contents ==
The book details Wilson's very early life, from babyhood to the summer she was 11, when she is about to start at secondary school. The book is interspersed with many photos of the author at that time in her life. She also tells the reader what inspired her to write certain books, and she ends each chapter with a question that the reader must answer; for instance "Who had a doll named Bluebell and an imaginary Rottweiler?" Then she will give the answer.

She also gives an account of her constantly warring parents, Biddy and Harry. The book reveals that she failed the 11-plus the first time she sat the exams, as she had a terrible cold. She passed it a second time.

She also writes about her favourite books, her first TV, her first doll, Mary Jane, who was apparently unwieldy, her parents' marriage, her first boyfriend David and many more facts about her life. She writes with love about her maternal grandparents, Ga and Gongon (nicknamed by Wilson before she could speak properly).

She has stated that from an early age she was determined to deal with "real" issues that affect children, and not to write Enid Blyton-style stories, although she greatly admired them. She was a great fan of the child actress Mandy Miller, who was about a year older. She frequently talks about her favourite books and dolls she played with when she was a child. She is still an avid collector of both books and dolls and she also still enjoys reading and writing.
