= The Mum Minder =

1993 novel by Jacqueline Wilson

The Mum-Minder
- Front cover
- Author: Jacqueline Wilson
- Illustrator: Nick Sharratt
- Language: English
- Genre: Children's novel （12-15）
- Publisher: Doubleday (first edition, paperback)
- Publication date: 1993
- Publication place: United Kingdom
- Pages: 190

The Mum-Minder is a children's novel written by Jacqueline Wilson. It was first published in 1993.

== Plot summary ==
It starts off with Sadie's mum catching the flu during half term. Sadie has a little sister called Sara, as well as the children that her mum looks after, called Gemma, Vincent and little baby Clive.

Sadie's mum is a childminder. Each day, they come round to Sadie's house so that her Mum can look after them while they are at work. Two days into half term, Sadie's mum gets the flu. To give Sadie's mother a chance to recuperate, the other children's mothers come up with a solution to take Sadie and the other kids to their workplaces for the rest of the week: Wednesday is the police station (Gemma's mum's job), Thursday is the office (Vincent's parents' job) and Friday is the chocolate shop (Clive's mum's job). Unfortunately, Sadie catches her mum's flu, so she can't return the holiday diary she was sent to do as homework from school...

== Characters ==
- Sadie: The protagonist in the story, who is eight (nearly nine) years old. For the half term homework she is set to do a diary of what she did for the week; accordingly, the chapters of the book are named with the days of the week and filled in with the day's events. Sadie helps her mum (and ultimately the other parents) to look after the children in the course of the week.
- Sara: Sadie's younger sister, who is thought to be at least a year old. Her favourite book to be read is thought to be Dominic the Vole.
- Gemma: One of Sadie's mum's charges, who is three years old. Gemma's mother is a police officer and on Wednesday the children spend the day at the police station.
- Vincent: The second of Sadie's mum's charges, who is two years old. Vincent's parents are office workers and on Thursday the children spend the day at their office.
- Clive: The third of Sadie's mum's charges, who is under a year old. Clive's mum owns a chocolate shop and on Friday the children spend the day in the shop.
- Sadie's mum: The mother of the protagonist and her younger sister, who works as a childminder. She is thought to be separated or divorced, as Sadie mentions she and Sara don't see much of their dad.
- Gemma's mum/WPC Parsons: The mother of the eldest charge, who works as a police officer (WPC Parsons being her work name). Her surname came to be mentioned after she took the children to the police station for the day and this didn't go down well at all with her boss.
- Vincent's mum and dad: The parents of the middle charge, who work in an office.
- Clive's mum: The mother of the youngest charge, who runs a chocolate shop.

== Reception ==
According to AudioFile, who called The Mum-Minder "a very funny story", "Jacqueline Wilson never fails to deliver a perfect story from the child's point of view".

Christina Hardyment, writing for The Independent, found that the book includes "quite a bit of snide comment on parental types, but the point of the tale is to give children a sense of their own competence".

In a review of the audiobook, AudioFile indicated that narrator Sophie Aldred "sounds great as tiny children, harried parents and snooty grandparents" as she takes the readers "along as the children wreak havoc in a police station [...], help office workers cope without a paper shredder and droolingly visit a chocolate shop".
