= Opal Plumstead =

2014 children's novel by Jacqueline Wilson

- Author: Jacqueline Wilson
- Illustrator: Nick Sharratt
- Language: English
- Genre: Children's novel
- Publisher: Doubleday Children's Books Corgi Childrens
- Publication date: 9 October 2014
- Publication place: United Kingdom
- Media type: Print (hardback, Ebook & paperback) and audiobook
- Pages: 528
- ISBN: 9780552574013

Opal Plumstead is a 2014 children's novel written by British author Jacqueline Wilson and illustrated by British illustrator Nick Sharratt. The plot revolves around fourteen-year-old Opal, who has to abandon her dream of going to university in order to work at a sweets factory after her father is sent to prison. Opal becomes a suffragette and develops a romance with the son of the factory owner, which is disrupted by the outbreak of World War I.

Wilson intended to set the novel in World War I, but ended up changing it to 1913 when she realised that several other writers were setting their novels during the war. Opal Plumstead, which is Wilson's 100th novel and took nine months to finish, was well received by critics and readers for Opal's character and the novel's portrayal of suffragettes.

== Premise ==
Opal Plumstead is a plain but intelligent fourteen-year-old girl who is planning to go to university, although she is also in love with art. She does not fit in at school but has Olivia as her best friend. However, when Opal's father is sent to prison for forging a cheque, she has to abandon her dreams and work in a sweets factory to economically support her mother and sister, Cassie. Although she does not get along with her co-workers, she forms a bond with Mrs Roberts, the owner of the factory and a suffragette. Opal becomes a suffragette too and begins a romance with Mrs Robert's son, Morgan, who she goes on to consider her soulmate. However, things are further disrupted because of the outbreak of World War I in 1914. Following the outbreak, Morgan dies fighting and Opal's father is released from prison. Opal is devastated by Morgan's death but ends up going to art school and makes a new friend, Sam.

== Production and release ==
A teaser video for the novel was released in April 2014. The cover was revealed on 30 June 2014, with a teaser that Opal would be "Wilson's most outspoken and fiery heroine yet". Two trailers were released for the novel, one of which was broadcast on television. It was released on 9 October 2014, published by Doubleday Children's Books. In November 2014, Wilson discussed the novel at the Richmond Literature Festival. National Geographic Kids and The Guardian held competitions for readers to win a copy of the book. The paperback edition was released on 4 June 2015.

Opal Plumstead is Wilson's 100th book. It is also Wilson's longest book at over 500 pages, and it took her around 9 months to write. Wilson explained, "I used to say to children I wanted to write 100 books and then I'd keel over. It did slightly prey on my mind, so I rather hurriedly wrote the 101st. I always like, for security's sake, to have another book on the go, and even the one after that". Wilson had not kept track of the exact number of novels she had written, but her publishers had told her that this would be her 100th book, so Wilson tried to make it "special". She added that reaching 100 books felt unreal, but that it felt "great to have written so many". Wilson did not believe that she would publish a sequel, considering Opal too old at the end of Opal Plumstead for a children's novel.

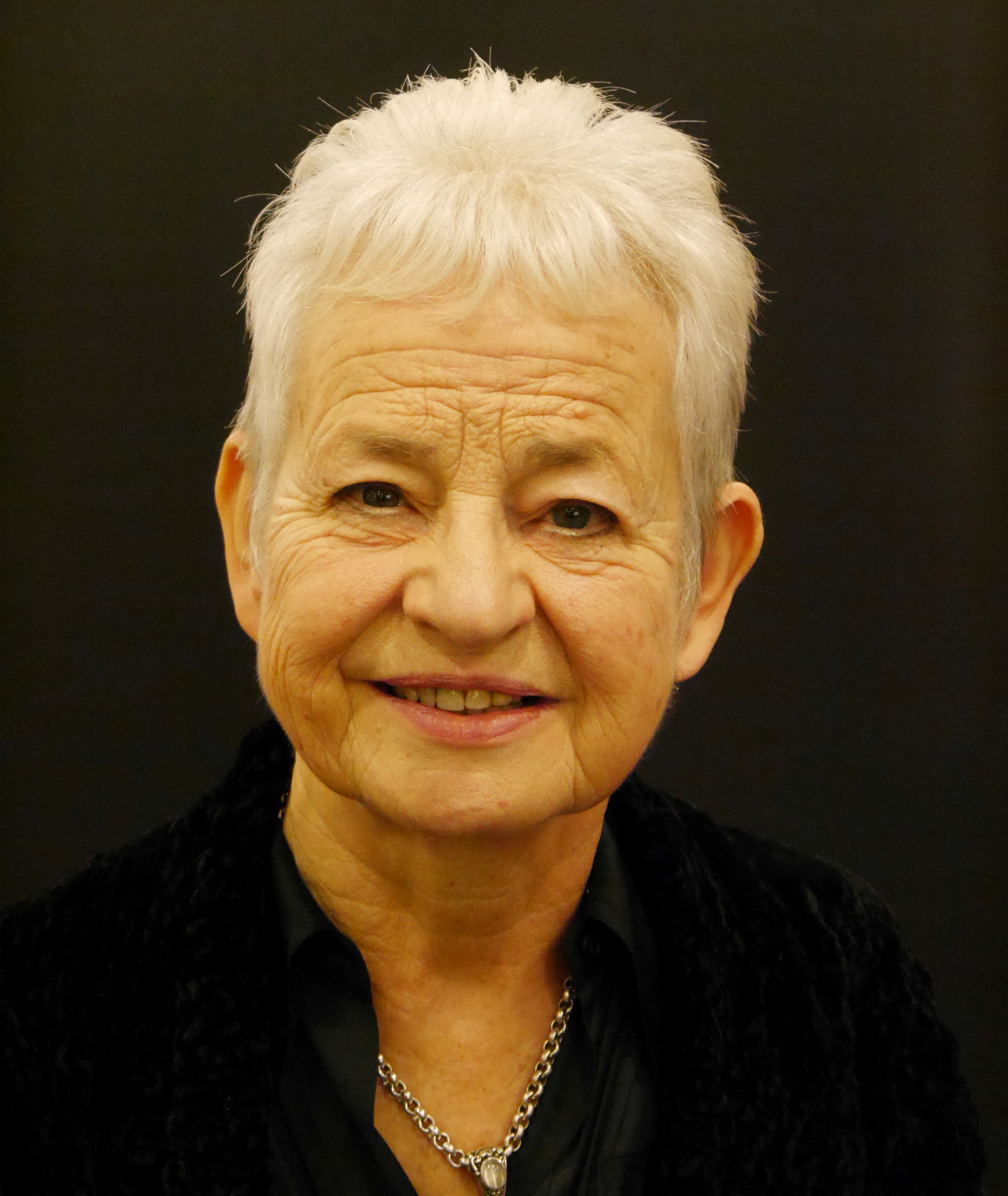
Jacqueline Wilson decided to set the novel in 1913.

Wilson had previously written several novels set in the Victorian era and realised that she liked writing historical novels, so she decided to change the setting for Opal Plumstead to the Edwardian period due to the social and political complexity of that era. Wilson intended to set the novel during World War I, but changed the setting to 1913 instead when she realised that many other children's authors were setting their novels during that conflict. However, the end of the novel features the outbreak of the war, with the author noting that she wanted the ending to reflect how the war "was such a tragic event and had a terrible impact on so many lives". Wilson believed that the novel had a feminist theme, explaining, "I don't tend to write about girls who just dream of getting married and being homemakers. Mostly they're the odd one out, or have had a difficult start in life. Hopefully my books are quite comforting. I don't think I've ever written about a girl who's conventionally pretty with everything going for her". She explained that the novel was about a smart girl from "respectable working-class home and how difficult it is to escape from your background".

Wilson enjoyed writing about the suffragettes and sweet factory in the novel. She explained that when she realised that Opal's character would be "fierce", "sharp" and "intelligent", she decided that Opal would become a suffragette. Part of Wilson's inspiration for the novel came from her wanting to use the information from an article she found regarding Edwardian sweet making, and also because she had "always" wanted to write about the suffragettes. Wilson researched the Edwardian era by reading novels from the era and works of social history, in addition to doing research on Emmeline Pankhurst and her family.

Wilson named the protagonist Opal as she had bought herself an opal ring in 2013, and she decided to name the protagonist of her 100th novel "Opal" when she saw the ring "gleaming" on her finger. She noted that she related to Opal as they were "both odd ones out at school and very imaginative". She also noted that Opal was her second favourite character that she had created, after Hetty Feather, although she admitted that she would have found her Opal to be "a trial" at times if she were her mother. She added, "I'd feel devastated about her missing out on her education – and delighted that she ended up at art school". Discussing the character after the novel, Wilson believed that Opal would feel "mostly happy and fulfilled artistically" but feel sad when thinking of Morgan despite being "content" with Sam. Also discussing the ending of the novel, Wilson explained:

"At the end Opal, who never believed in romance, falls in love with somebody who gets killed in the First World War. That took my readers by surprise – I think most girls have learned about the First World War, particularly during the centenary year, but it didn't actually cross their minds that the death could be of the boy next door, or their brother or sweetheart. I didn't leave it there. I needed to show life goes on. Opal doesn't languish, she goes to art school. I want to show my girls it's not like a fairytale waiting for the prince to come – sometimes the prince doesn't come, so you have to have something else."

== Reception and analysis ==
Lydia Slater from The Times noted how Wilson's own background was similar to the setting of the novel. Bonnie Evie Gifford from Happiful.com placed the novel on her list of empowering books for children, writing: "Featuring an outspoken heroine and Jacqueline Wilson's distinct, captivating style and Nick Sharratt's small, quirky illustrations, children will enjoy the unique blend of fiction and history". Lorraine Kelly believed that Wilson making Opal into a suffragette made "perfect sense" and noted that she really liked the character. The review in The Lady described Opal as one of the "most loveable and memorable characters in modern literature". Educationalist Nikki Gamble compared Opal Plumstead to Carrie's War by Nina Bawden, A Parcel of Patterns by Jill Paton Walsh, All Fall Down by Sally Nicholls and Lady Mary by Lucy Worsley as examples of historical fiction for young readers. Elizabeth Hawksley from the Historical Novel Society opined that the first section of the book, before Opal starts working at the sweet factory, could benefit from "judicious pruning". However, she praised Wilson's portrayal of the "feel of pre-1914 Britain" and how the times were changing, such as through the pressure of young men to go to the war and distinctions between classes. She also called Opal "plump and shabbily dressed" and her father "beloved" and "hopeless".

Alex O'Connell from The Times praised Wilson's ability to make "interesting, lovable characters who navigate 9 to 12-year-olds through key moments in history", calling it "unmatched". He believed that Opal's mother was "imprisoned by her lower class and mean spirit" and praised Opal, Cassie and the descriptions of the sweet-making process. He added, "Yes, the plot becomes a little chocolate box, but you can forgive Wilson that and the rather unlikely romantic couplings and overlong scenes (I would have offered to lock up Opal's father myself, such was the preamble)". Jill Murphy from The Bookbag noted Wilson's "prolific" milestone of 100 books and liked how she was celebrating her 100th book with the 100th anniversary of World War I. Murphy opined that setting the novel in the lead up to the war was "typical of the way [Wilson] thinks" due to Opal being influenced by her settings, including the Suffragettes, the lack of welfare support from the state and her parents' mistakes. Murphy also called Opal a "fabulous central character" that one could not help rooting for "beats her own path through a rapidly changing world with real heart and determination", and she called the other characters "sympathetic". She added that the novel "reads like a breeze" and praised its attention to detail regarding the historical setting.

The Guardian published a number of reviews from young readers, who generally praised the novel and Opal's character, although one reviewer believed that the book had a bunch of "flaws" and opined that Opal acted too childish for her age. Another young reader wrote an article about the suffragettes in the novel, and felt that Wilson "beautifully explains" Opal's perception of the suffragettes in the book. They believed that the novel was "very sensitive to the complexities of the situation" by featuring Opal's mother being negative about the movement, and also opined that more writers should focus on educating readers. They also called the novel "entertaining" and noted that it provided them with much knowledge about the suffragettes. National Geographic Kids called the novel a "cooker". Additionally, Heather Sandlin from The Guardian put the novel on her list of young adult novels that featured the suffragettes in an article to celebrate the release of the 2015 film Suffragette. Sandlin opined, "Through her newfound friendship, [Opal] is plunged into the world of the Suffragettes and the rights that they so bravely fight for. The passionate women she encounters will teach Opal that integrity and hope are never truly lost". Duncan Hall from The Argus noted how it "wasn't necessarily the urge to vote" which touched Wilson's female readers regarding the novel, as Wilson herself noted in an interview that with him that readers were surprised at Morgan being killed in the war.
