= Love Lessons =

Love Lessons may refer to:

- Love Lessons (album), a 1995 album by Tracy Byrd
  - "Love Lessons" (song), its title track
- Love Lessons (novel), a 2005 British children's novel by Jacqueline Wilson

== See also ==
- Lessons in Love (disambiguation), including A Lesson in Love
