= Glubbslyme =

1987 novel by Jacqueline Wilson

- First edition
- Author: Jacqueline Wilson
- Illustrator: Jane Cope
- Language: English
- Genre: Children's fantasy
- Publisher: Oxford University Press
- Publication date: 1987
- Publication place: United Kingdom
- Pages: 172

Glubbslyme is a fantasy novel by the children's author Jacqueline Wilson.

== Plot summary ==
A girl called Rebecca has just had a row with her best friend, Sarah, because of Mandy, who is a pretty, girly type, and who can sometimes be quite nasty and rude to Rebecca. Both Rebecca and Mandy think that Sarah is their best friend. One day, the girls discover a pond. Rebecca spins a tale, saying that it is a witch's pond in which a witch drowned. Sarah seems to be impressed, but then Mandy, trying to get Sarah's attention, says that the pond wasn't deep enough. Sarah seems to think the same thing. Rebecca goes in the pond to prove it, but Sarah leaves, saying that Rebecca is a baby. While she is in the pond a toad grips at her foot. Rebecca finds out that the toad is Glubbslyme, who is the witch's familiar and has magical powers. Together they seek revenge on Mr. Baker, a man who is fed up of Rebecca because she always ruins her flower beds. They also seek revenge on Mandy. In the end Rebecca and Sarah become friends again.

== Illustrations ==
Nick Sharratt (Wilson's regular illustrator) only in fact does the cover illustration. Jane Cope does the book illustrations.

== Reception ==
Miriam Moore from The Spinoff wrote that the novel was her least favourite of Wilson's books that she read, opining, "Too much slyme, not enough drama."
