= Girls in Tears =

2002 novel by Jacqueline Wilson

- The original cover
- Author: Jacqueline Wilson
- Illustrator: Nick Sharratt
- Language: English
- Series: Girls
- Genre: Young adult
- Publisher: Corgi Books
- Publication date: 2002
- Publication place: United Kingdom
- Media type: Print (hardback, Ebook & paperback) and audiobook
- Pages: 226 (2016 edition)
- ISBN: 9780552557436
- Preceded by: Girls Out Late
- Followed by: Think Again

Girls in Tears is a 2002 young adult novel, written by Dame Jacqueline Wilson and illustrated by Nick Sharratt. It is the fourth installment in Wilson's Girls series and a direct sequel to Girls Out Late (1999). The plot revolves around Ellie and her two friends, Magda and Nadine, with all three of them going through personal emotional struggles. The novel received positive reviews and won the 2003 National Book Awards Children's Book of the Year. In 2024, it was announced that a sequel, Think Again, would be released later that year.

== Background ==
Girls in Tears was published in 2002 by Doubleday, written by Dame Jacqueline Wilson and illustrated by Nick Sharratt. It is the fourth book in Wilson's "Girls" series, following Girls in Love (1997), Girls Under Pressure (1998) and Girls out Late (1999). The series were intended for an older audience than the majority of Wilson's works, such as The Story of Tracy Beaker. The series were later adapted into a TV show, Girls in Love, which ran from 2003 to 2005. Girls in Tears was originally the last book in the series, but it was announced in March 2024 that Wilson would publish a sequel to the series, titled Think Again.

== Premise ==
In the novel, best friends Ellie, Magda and Nadine are struggling with personal issues, which is testing their friendships. Ellie, the narrator of the novel, is struggling in her relationship with her boyfriend Russell, whilst Magda is grieving the death of her pet hamster, who her friends did not know about. Meanwhile, Nadine gets frustrated over Ellie and Magda warning her about meeting up with a man she has met online.

== Reception ==
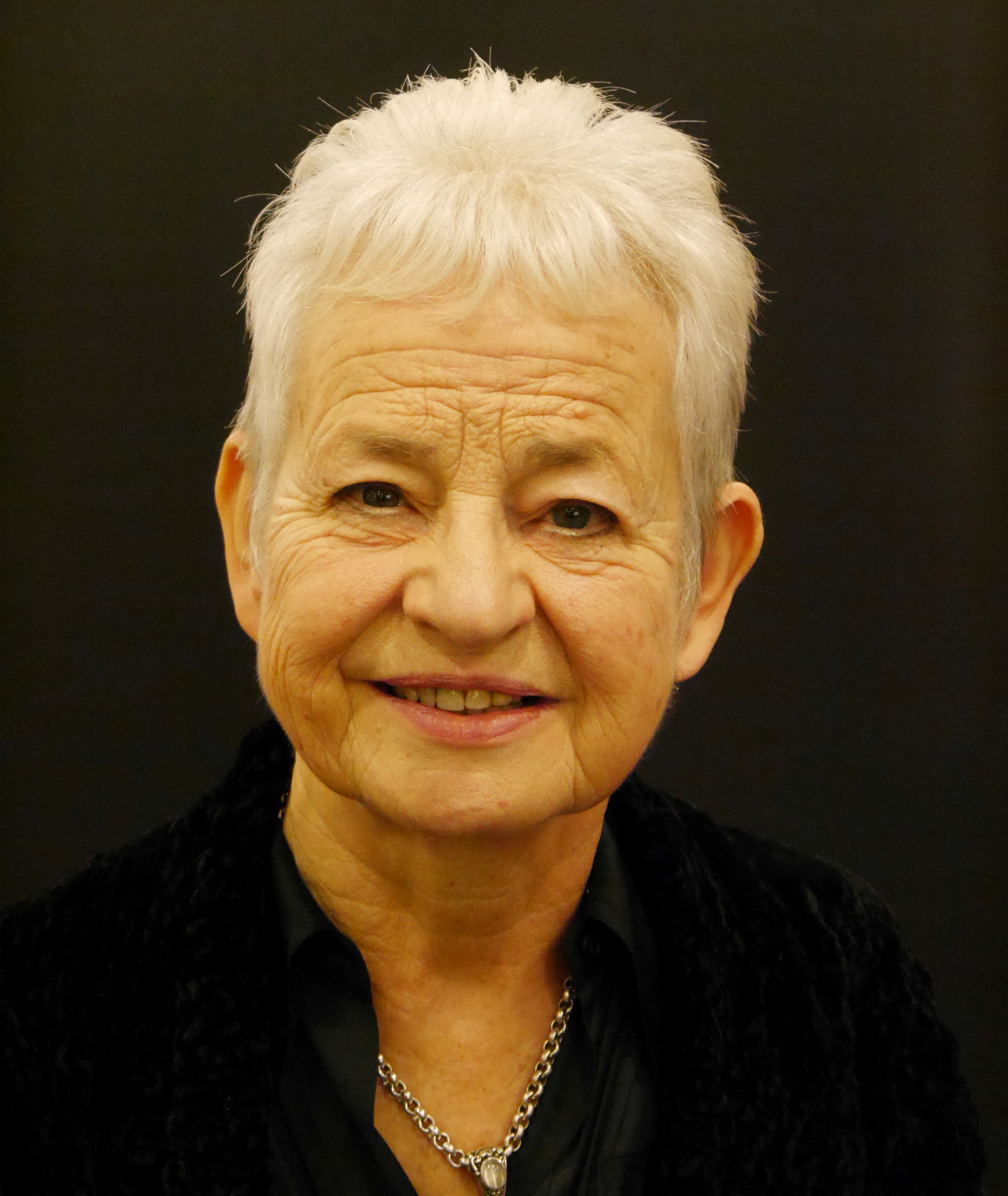
Jacqueline Wilson, the author of Girls in Tears, received praise for the writing of the book.

In October 2002, Girls in Tears reached number one on the "Children's bestsellers" chart compiled by Nielsen BookScan. It also named as one of the bestsellers of the Children's sections in November 2002, complied by the Booksellers Association of Ireland. The novel won the 2003 National Book Awards Children's Book of the Year. The Daily Echo put the novel on their list of "Top 10 children's Christmas books".

A writer from Publishers Weekly called the novel an "easygoing, humorous tale", whilst a review from Newcastle Upon Tyne Evening Chronicle wrote that they would recommend it to "all teenage girls". A writer from School Library Journal noted that it would appeal to many girl readers dealing with relationship issues. A reviewer from CBBC Newsround praised the novel, calling it a "fun easy read" and joking that they almost missed their bus stop due to their head being "so deep in the story". They believed that the "really believable" characters were the highlight of the novel, and called Ellie's insecurities "spot on". However, they believed that the reveal of Ellis' true identity was predictable. A writer from the Evening Standard recommended the novel for girls aged between 11 and 14 and opined that Wilson excelled in "capturing the type of obsessively introspective and selfish behaviour that's unique to teenage girls and sets it against a mildly dysfunctional domestic background". Julia Eccleshare from The Guardian observed of the novel, "it's the girls' friendship itself that is under scrutiny and, when it comes down to it, nothing - not even boyfriends - is more important than girls' friendships. All this and much, much more Jacqueline Wilson understands perfectly. Never preaching, she nonetheless manages to give valuable advice - especially, here, on the dangers of dating through the internet and on how to read the complex and sometimes contradictory rules of growing up". She also opined that Girls in Tears and its prequels were "unerringly authentic" of pre-teens heightened emotions.

Jessica Brunt from BuzzFeed ranked Girls in Tears as her ninth favourite Jacqueline Wilson book, writing, "Waiting for a new 'Girls' book to be released was the '00s equivalent of shutting your laptop on a Friday evening and heading out for a wine...priceless." Brunt noted that the plot involved breakups and reduced communication in the characters' friendships, and revealed that she found the novel less "rebellious" than its prequels. Dusty Baxter-Wright ranked Girls in Tears as the most "distressing" Jacqueline Wilson novel, adding that the entire "Girls" series was "INTENSE". Courtney Pochin from Metro noted how the book "features heart-break all round", and wrote how fans had been wanting Wilson to write a follow up novel to the series. Miriam Moore from The Spinoff liked the novel less than the previous three Girls books, opening that the novel was not as "well-themed and therefore not as memorable" as its predecessors.
