= Lessons in Love =

Lessons in Love or A Lesson in Love may refer to:

== Music ==
- "Lessons in Love" (Jeri Lynne Fraser song), 1961; covered by Cliff Richard and the Shadows and the Allisons
- "Lessons in Love" (Level 42 song), 1986
- Lessons in Love (album), a 2008 album by Lloyd
- "Lessons in Love (All Day, All Night)", a song by Neon Trees featuring Kaskade from the album Picture Show (2012)

== Film and television ==
- Lessons in Love (1921 film), an American film directed by Chester Withey starring Constance Talmadge
- Lessons in Love (1935 film), a German historical comedy film
- Lesson in Love, a Taiwanese web series starring Hsu Wei-ning, Edward Chen, Hsueh Shih-ling and Ivy Yin
- Some Kind of Beautiful (UK title: Lessons in Love), a 2014 American film
- A Lesson in Love (1931 film), an American comedy film
- A Lesson in Love (1954 film), a Swedish comedy film

== See also ==
- Love Lessons (disambiguation)
