= Summer reading program =

Seasonal activity at libraries to encourage reading

Summer reading programs take place at 95% of public libraries in the United States. Children, teens, and adults participate in activities meant to encourage reading, such as keeping a reading log. Other names for summer reading programs include vacation reading club, summer reading club, vacation reading program, and summer library program.

== History ==
Summer reading programs at public libraries in the United States began no later than the 1890s. Early programs featured how to care for books, reading logs or lists, and focused on older kids and teens. By 1929, summer reading programs were sometimes themed. In the 1940s, professional publications began including prevention of summer reading loss as a goal of summer reading programs. As of 2014, 95% of public libraries in the United States offer a summer reading program. Summer reading programs are common in Canada as well.

== Features ==
Two thirds of public libraries host a summer reading program with a theme. Most summer reading programs offer books, coupons, or bookmarks as incentives for participating. Participants receive those incentives when they achieve a goal. Libraries commonly keep track of the number of participants, time spent reading, or number of books read.

== See also ==
- Collaborative Summer Library Program
- Summer Reading Challenge
