= Love Lessons (novel) =

2005 novel by Jacqueline Wilson

- First edition
- Author: Jacqueline Wilson
- Language: English
- Publisher: Doubleday
- Publication date: 2005
- Publication place: United Kingdom
- ISBN: 9780385608367

Love Lessons is a British novel intended for older readers by Jacqueline Wilson, first published by Doubleday in 2005. It is illustrated by Nick Sharratt, although the only illustrations in this book are the chapter-headings.

Some of the characters in Love Lessons are similar to those in one of the author's previous books, Waiting for the Sky to Fall (1983).

== Plot summary ==
The book revolves around a 14-year-old narrator, Prudence, also known as 'Prue' King. Prue and her sister Grace are homeschooled but are forced to go to school after their father, a bookshop owner, suffers a stroke after an argument with Prue after she spends money meant for private maths tuition on lingerie. The family are deeply in debt and cannot afford to get private tutors to homeschool the girls in all subjects. Thus, they must attend the local comprehensive as every other school is full up. Being introverted and artistic yet bad at mathematics, Prue does not fit in as well as Grace but soon develops a close relationship with her art teacher, Mr Raxberry, also known as Rax, and begins to develop feelings for him. Prue struggles to make friends, and is constantly ridiculed by the girls in the class. This teasing steps up a level during a P.E lesson when they spot Prue wearing the lingerie she bought at the start of the book. She later makes friends with a boy called Toby, who soon develops feelings for Prue despite having a girlfriend, Rita. Prue does not reciprocate his romantic feelings, but is willing to be friends. She helps him with his reading as he is dyslexic at the weekend however Rita finds out after her friend, Aimee spots Prue and Toby together. Rita and Prue end up getting in a physical fight at school the next day after it’s revealed that Toby broke up with Rita over his feelings for Prue.

Prue soon realises that she herself has fallen in love with Rax and Rax (also known as Keith Raxberry) somewhat reciprocates, despite being married with children, whom Prue starts to babysit on Friday evenings. One evening after the babysitting, Prue talks to Rax about her feelings for him, and asks if he loves her. Rax tells Prue to leave the car, but whispers to himself “yes” as he drives away. Prue sees this. After this, Rax tries to distance himself from Prue at school. Life at school becomes more difficult for Prue as she doesn’t have anyone to talk to, and the girls have all turned against her because Toby dumped Rita for her. Rax later tells Prue that he doesn’t want her to babysit his children anymore due to her feelings for him, claiming it is dangerous for both of them to continue. Prue promises she won’t make things awkward or discuss her feelings for him if he lets her continue to babysit. Rax agrees to let Prue babysit one last time, as long as she promises to tell his wife, Marianne, that she can’t do it again. Prue agrees to this promise. Later at Rax’s, she breaks her promise; Rax lies to Marianne in front of Prue that Prue’s mother isn’t happy to let her babysit anymore, and Prue denies this to Marianne. Marianne is pleased Prue can stay. Rax is angry at Prue but keeps quiet. When he drives her home, Prue kisses him in the car. They drive off together and kiss some more, before Rax drives her back home again.

Toby visits Prue, and finds a box of Victorian erotica books amongst all the other stock in the bookshop. Prue wants to be left alone, and tells Toby to borrow one of the books as it might encourage him to practice his reading. Grace and Mrs King see Toby leave, and invite him to come upstairs to the flat for some cakes. Toby suggests to help them get out of their debt that they sell their books online and sell Mrs. King’s cakes and coffee in the shop. Mrs King is worried about what her husband will think, but concedes that it’s a good idea.

Mr King then unexpectedly gets discharged from hospital early as he is doing well in recovery. He now uses a wheelchair and still struggles to speak as a result of his stroke. He sees Prue and Grace in uniform, and loses his temper. He cannot physically stop them going to school, though, and Mrs King encourages them to run. This surprises Prue and Grace, who are used to their mother doing what their father tells her and never goes against his wishes.

Once Prue gets to school, she runs to find Rax and tells her that her dad knows. Panicked, Rax assumes she means that her Dad knows about Prue and Rax’s secret relationship. Prue corrects him and tells him that her Dad knows about her and Grace going to school, and wants to stop them attending. Rax can’t hide the relief on his face and Prue is hurt that he doesn’t seem to care. She cries, and asks if their love means nothing to Rax. Rax holds her and tries to reassure her that everything will work out. Prue tells Rax she loves him.

Special needs student Sarah witnesses the embrace. Rax tries to lie to Sarah, saying that Prue hurt her eye, and Prue is dismissed where she runs into Toby. He wants to talk to her, but Prue tells him to leave her alone.

Later, in Prue’s English lesson, Sarah then reveals what she saw and heard earlier in the day when she saw Prue and Rax, not realising the impact of her words. The rest of the class and teacher react in shock. Sarah, Prue and Rax are called to the headteachers office separately. After talking to the headteacher, Prue realises Rax has lied to protect himself, claiming that Prue had a crush on him, he was just trying to be kind to her, and that nothing ever happened between them. Prue is shocked but backs up Rax’s version of events. Prue is reprimanded by the headteacher, then excluded and transferred to another school, whilst Rax gets to keep his job.

Later, Rax meets up with Prue one last time to say goodbye, and admits he loves her. They part ways. Prue considers running away but decides to stay with her family. She obtains a place in the local grammar school and Rax remains at the comprehensive.

Toby and Prue remain friends. Toby discovers that the Victorian erotica books in the family bookshop are very valuable, and tells Mr and Mrs King. The family sell the full set of books for twelve thousand five hundred pounds, which is enough to pay off all the family debts.

== Main characters ==
- Prudence 'Prue' Charity King - A fourteen-year-old girl who is homeschooled by her father, and the narrator of the novel.
- Grace Patience King - Prue's eleven-year-old younger sister.
- Keith 'Rax' Raxberry - The art teacher who teaches at Wentworth.
- Toby Baker - A popular boy in Prudence's year and Rita's former boyfriend. He is dyslexic and gets Prue to help him with his reading.
- Mrs. King - Prue and Grace's subdued yet caring mother.
- Bernard King - Prue and Grace's short-tempered and domineering father. He has a stroke at the start of the book and spends the majority of the book in the hospital. He does not want his daughters to go to a conventional school and insists on homeschooling them, despite an inspector raising concerns about the quality of their education. He also forbids them from owning a TV or eating foreign food, leading the children to have a limited knowledge of the world.
- Rita Rogers - Toby's former girlfriend, at the start of the book, but he later dumps her for Prue, although Prue is not interested.
- Marianne Raxberry - Rax's wife and the mother of Harry and Lily.

== Controversy ==
Due to an underage student kissing her teacher, who then somewhat reciprocates her romantic feelings, the book has become more controversial in the 2020s. A theme of victim blaming was also spoke about at the time, since the main character is excluded from school, while the teacher gets to keep his job. In 2023, Wilson stated that she "would not write the book today", as well as acknowledging that she had doubts at the time about whether to write this particular plot.
