= Little Darlings (Wilson novel) =

2010 novel by Jacqueline Wilson

- First edition
- Author: Jacqueline Wilson
- Illustrator: Nick Sharratt
- Cover artist: Nick Sharratt
- Genre: Children's, Romance, Comedy, Adventure, Mystery
- Publisher: Doubleday
- Publication date: 4 March 2010
- Pages: 310 (1st edition hardback)
- Preceded by: Tracy Beaker's Thumping Heart (Red Nose Day 2009)
- Followed by: The Longest Whale Song

Little Darlings is a 2010 children's novel by the best-selling British author Jacqueline Wilson. It was adapted for television by Sky UK in February 2022.

== Synopsis ==
The story revolves around two daughters of ageing rock star Danny Kilman. The first, Destiny, is the result of a short affair with a fan (born out of wedlock), and lives with idealistic mother Kate on a rundown estate called Bilefield in Manchester. The second is Sunset, his oldest legitimate child, who doesn't enjoy the hectic, drama filled life that comes from being the daughter of a celebrity, and is being emotionally abused due to her appearance and personality.

As part of Destiny's eleventh birthday, Kate has arranged they go to the London premiere of the film "Milky Star", in which Danny has a cameo as himself, where hopefully they'll be able to meet him and tell him Destiny is his daughter. The plan fails, as only Sunset seems to notice the two. Kate realises she hasn't planned how to get home, and they're stranded in London till morning. She decides they might as well use the time to seek out Danny at his home in Robin Hill. Destiny climbs over the fence and comes across Sunset in the garden. The two become fast friends and Sunset believes her story about them being sisters, but Suzy sees them and shouts at them and throws them off their property.

After finding their way back home, Destiny heads to school. Her teacher, Mr Roberts, announces they're doing an end-of-year talent show called "Bilefield's got Talent" to celebrate the end of elementary school. Destiny decides to sing the Danny Kilman song "Destiny", which she's named after. Mr Roberts decides to put her on last, due to being the best act in the class.

Sunset tries to convince Danny that Destiny is his daughter, but he insists it is a lie to get money and attention from the media. To make up for failing, Sunset finds out Destiny's address, using the Danny Kilman fan-site, and sends her a letter and her leather jacket.

At the grand birthday party for Sweetie, Sunset's sister, Suzy and Danny get into a fight. Danny walks out with an actress Sunset has dubbed "Big Mouth", whose real name is Lizzie Shaw.

At the first run of the talent show, the judges panel is made up of students and it is treated like a popularity contest. Destiny is marked second to last place, because she's new and isn't part of any of the local gangs, the Flat boys and the Speedos. At the evening version, however, the teachers judge and Destiny comes first place. She sends Sunset a copy of the DVD recording.

The next day, Kate confesses the reason she's suddenly become insistent on Danny Kilman knowing about Destiny is she's worried she might be ill and wants to know Destiny will be looked after if the worst happens. Destiny insists that Kate see a doctor and they find out that Kate has hyperthyroidism.

Danny returns to Robin Hill with his manager, Rose-May, to tell the family about a chance to start Sweetie's star-career early. She qualifies to be on a show called Little Darlings about talented child of celebrities. Debs, the producer arrives the next day to see if Sweetie can sing, but as she's about to she loses her first tooth and starts crying. Debs decides Sweetie is too young to handle being on television. As she's about to leave, Sunset remembers the DVD and shows her. Destiny's striking resemblance to Danny and her amazing singing voice convince Danny, Rose-May, and Debs she's Danny's daughter, and they decide they can use it as a publicity stunt to distract from the recent bad press Danny's been getting for running off with Lizzie "Big Mouth."

Debs gets in contact with Destiny and Kate, and offers them a chance to be on Little Darlings and meet Danny. Destiny accepts and they're driven to London. They film her being reunited with Danny and she finally gets to see Sunset again.

== Characters ==
- Destiny Williams/Kilman – Daughter of Danny and Kate. She is a very talented singer, and knows all the words to her father's songs. While she would rather paint a picture of a fearless, untouchable young girl, however, when her beloved mother falls ill, she must learn to show others her vulnerability in order to get her special mother treatment. She has a very passionate and loyal nature, and is willing to put her own safety at risk to save her loved ones. Sometimes she feels as if she is missing something, as if she and her mother are an unfinished puzzle, and when she finds Sunset who also feels like this, they become very special friends.
- Sunset Kilman – Daughter of Danny and Suzy Kilman. She is six months younger than Destiny and the elder sister of Ace and Sweetie. She does not like being part of a famous family and wishes she could have a life like Destiny's. She looks like her Dad, long dark curly hair and a big nose. She also is a very good songwriter. Poor Sunset is very insecure, due to other people's negative comments towards her. She confides in Destiny, trusting her and forming a very special, precious bond. She is very sensitive to others emotions, and she has a very compassionate and soft nature. She summarizes herself as a sensitive, insecure girl who deeply needs a friend.
- Danny Kilman – Ageing Rockstar, the father of Destiny, Sunset, Sweetie and Ace. He does not know Destiny is his daughter. He finds out that Destiny is his child towards the end of the book. He displays affection to Sunset in front of the cameras, however, in real life he is very mean to her and once told her that he wishes she were more like his beloved daughter, Sweetie.
- Kate Williams – Destiny's mum, who believes Danny, Sunset and Destiny should have met a long time ago. Kate is ever so imaginative, and tries to stay positive when her and poor Destiny are forced to move into a dull, unsafe apartment in a rough and unsuitable estate. She has a very gentle and empathetic temperament, and wants her little Destiny to grow up with he best possible childhood. She can't give Destiny much, but she gives her unconditional love, and that is enough the get them both through when poor Kate falls ill with thyroid issues.
- Suzy Kilman – Danny's wife and mother of Sunset, Sweetie and Ace. She used to be a model before she had children, she is going through an "emotional process" throughout the book and generally doesn't appreciate Sunset but hates her even more when she brings up Destiny to Danny. Suzy is violent and abusive towards her daughter, even slapping her once, and has forbidden her from eating sweet foods, saying that she is too big. As time passes she begins to dislike her daughter ever so slightly, and underneath her mask of a perfect lady, Sunset begins to see somebody who is very sensitive too and is just as hurt by the situation as she is.
- Sweetie Kilman – Daughter of Suzy and Danny and Sunset's younger sister. She is described as little, blonde and very pretty. She has known how to model "since she could toddle". Sweetie sometimes teases her sister, telling her that she is the pretty one and twirling her lovely, soft blonde hair in poor Sunset's face. However, when a shadow of sadness is cast over her beloved family, Sweetie leans on Sunset for support, showing her love and sweetness.
- Ace Kilman – Son of Suzy and Danny and Sunset's baby brother. He likes to dress up in a tiger costume and be called Tiger-man. Ace is a very innocent little boy and in this emotional time, he also turns to his beloved sister for support and care.
- Claudia – Posh nanny of Sunset, Sweetie and Ace. Sunset is "the only one who really likes her". She buys Sunset a notebook to write all her songs in. In the beginning, none of the children are special friends with her. However, when their family's turmoil forces her to leave, she shows a lot of maturity and compassion, especially towards dear Sunset.
- Rose-May – Danny's strict manager.
- Barkie – Danny's goofy fan club manager, who used to have a crush on Danny. Her actual name is Jane Smith. "Barkie" is very sweet, and she is described by Sunset as "very nice, and always smiling". She has optimistic and goofy character, however, she is also sensitive to all of the sadness spreading around the house.
- Jack Myers – A close friend of Destiny, who was described as "Destiny's boyfriend" by Jack's elder brother. It is suggested throughout the novel that he likes Destiny. He hugs Destiny at the end of the evening performance when she wins. Just like Destiny, he paints a picture of a boy who can not be hurt. But when tragedy strikes Destiny, he expresses affection towards her and supports her deeply during her long, emotional journey.
- Angel Thomas – Destiny's deadly enemy who is horrid to Destiny. She comes second place in the competition and wins the afternoon performance. Angel is very confident, and while her morals are right, her bravery and fearsome temper may lead her to do things she later regrets. While she doesn't apologize, as time passes she begins to leave Destiny alone.
- Mr Roberts – Destiny's teacher who is in charge of the talent show. He can be a firm character occasionally, but he shows care for Destiny when she succeeds, and even becomes ever so slightly emotional after her beautiful singing.
- Mr Juniper – A strict teacher in Destiny's school who gives out detentions. He is on the judging panel in Destiny's school production.
- Miss Avery – A popular sports teacher who helps in the school production. She is also on the judging panel.
- Mrs Riley – A kind teacher in Destiny's school who is very popular around the kids. She too is on the judging panel.
- Miss Evans – A young girly teacher at Destiny's school. She is on the judging panel as well.
- Lizzie Shaw (also referred to as Big Mouth) – Danny's new girlfriend who he met at the Milky Star premier. She is an actress who is also in the film. Sunset, Sweetie and Ace all hate her but Suzy even more so as she is very protective of Danny and despises Lizzie very much.

== Production ==
Wilson has noted that she has often been asked if she would write a sequel to Little Darlings and has said that she might as she wants to find out what happens afterwards.

== Adaptation ==
In January 2022, it was announced a miniseries adaptation of the novel written by Nathan Bryon and Jonny Wright would air on 11 February on Sky Kids. Janae Vito and Diaana Babnicova starred as Destiny and Sunset respectively, while Lemar played as Danny Kilman and Jamelia as Kate Williams. A spinoff On Tour: Little Darlings will air alongside the main series.
