= Love Frankie =

2020 novel by Jacqueline Wilson

- Author: Jacqueline Wilson
- Illustrator: Nick Sharratt
- Language: English
- Genre: children's novel, young adult novel
- Publisher: Puffin (first edition, hardback)
- Publication date: 17 September 2020
- Publication place: United Kingdom
- Media type: Print (hardback & paperback) and audiobook
- Pages: 432
- ISBN: 0857535897
- OCLC: 1140164153

Love Frankie is a young adult and children's novel by English novelist Jacqueline Wilson. The book was published on 17 September 2020, after two delays due to the COVID-19 pandemic.

== Background ==
Love Frankie is Wilson's 111th published work, and the second to feature a gay love story, the first being Kiss (2007). In an interview with Lisa Allardice of The Guardian, Wilson stated that Love Frankie is "jam-packed [with issues]: a sick mum, separation, stepfamilies, sibling rivalry, bullying, falling in love". She also stated that she "put her heart and soul into the book", and "felt it was important to include characters from diverse backgrounds in her stories." Love Frankie was originally scheduled for release on 16 April 2020, but due to the effects of the COVID-19 pandemic, the release was pushed back to 20 August 2020. The publish date was then delayed for a second time to 17 September 2020.

== Premise ==
The book centers around almost-14-year-old tomboy Frankie, whose mother has multiple sclerosis (MS). Frankie feels she is growing up too quickly, and bullies at school are tormenting her. However, when Frankie begins spending time with Sally, the leader of the bullies, the pair strike up a friendship. Frankie becomes confused when she wonders whether she wants Sally to be her friend or girlfriend.
