= Vicky Angel =

2000 novel by Jacqueline Wilson

- Author: Jacqueline Wilson
- Illustrator: Nick Sharratt
- Cover artist: Nick Sharratt
- Language: English
- Genre: Children's novel
- Published: 2 November 2000 (Doubleday) 1 November 2001 (Corgi Yearling)
- Publication place: United Kingdom
- Media type: Print and audiobook
- Pages: 144 pp
- ISBN: 0-385-60040-2

Vicky Angel is a children's book by Jacqueline Wilson, about a young girl's struggle with her grief over losing her best friend, Vicky. It was first published in 2000.

== Plot summary ==
Vicky and Jade are best friends. Vicky is a flamboyant and outgoing girl while Jade is timid and usually follows Vicky's lead. After fighting about which extra-curricular activity to take together and arguing as Jade finally sticks up for herself, Vicky dashes out on to the road without looking and is struck by a car. Jade travels in the ambulance with Vicky to the hospital, where Vicky dies from her internal injuries. As a distraught Jade runs from the hospital, Vicky appears to Jade as a spirit – although Jade is the only one who can see or hear her. After Jade attends Vicky's funeral, Vicky's spirit revisits her.

When Jade returns to school, she is encouraged to attend the running activity Vicky had signed them up for. There, she makes an unlikely friend in Fatboy Sam, who Jade originally assumed had a crush on Vicky; he later reveals it was Jade whom he was interested in. However, Vicky's spirit is snide about her friendship with Sam. She influences Jade into saying cruel things to him, although he later forgives her.

As Jade tries to get used to life without Vicky, or at least without a Vicky that other people can see, Vicky's spectre becomes more and more controlling. Jade is forced to do as Vicky wishes, and can't get on with her life and make new friends. Jade finally goes to a bereavement counsellor and discovers how to control Vicky. Eventually she must attend the inquest into Vicky's death. During it, she is overcome with guilt and emotion when trying to recall Vicky's death and she flees the court building, running down the street and into the road where she is nearly hit by a car. Vicky appears and pulls her back. Vicky tells Jade that the accident was not her fault, freeing her from her guilt. After saving Jade's life, Vicky grows angel wings and can finally move on, floating into the sky and leaving Jade to move on with her life.

== Characters ==
- Vicky Waters: The title character of the story who dies after running out to the road without looking and being struck by a car. She appears to her best friend Jade as a ghost (see Vicky's ghost below) and tells her what to do. She is very confident and flamboyant, while Jade tends to follow.
- Jade Marshall: Vicky's best friend who finds it hard to cope over Vicky's death. She is more timid than Vicky, tending to follow her lead rather than doing things for herself, such as wanting to join a drama club but not doing it if Vicky won't.
- Sam: Often known as Fatboy Sam, he is the class clown of Vicky and Jade's class and as his nickname suggests, is very fat. He understands how Jade felt after Vicky died and has a crush on Jade, which Jade thinks was a crush on Vicky which Sam transferred over to her. However, he explains to Jade that she was the girl he had a crush on, as Vicky was mean when she was alive.
- Madeleine: A chubby but sweet girl who likes pink and white colours, Vicky calls her Marshmallow Madeleine due to this. She becomes good friends with Jade.
- Jenny: One of Madeleine's best friends, she has been known to have a lot of boyfriends, including Ryan Harper, who was Vicky's boyfriend until she died.
- Vicky-Two: Another of Madeleine's best friends, she is a very different girl to the late Vicky, a cheeky, bouncy tomboy who Madeleine and Jenny call Vicky after the late Vicky dies, which Jade gets angry at.
- Anne Cambridge: The French teacher at Jade's school. She is strict when teaching but is a nice person and suggests that Jade speaks to Stevie Wainwright, a grief counselor.
- Stevie Wainwright: Anne Cambridge's vicar friend who wears flowery trousers and visits the local shopping center. She lost her only child, Jessica, when she died from leukaemia, aged 5. Stevie comes to Jade's school after Vicky dies because she has done a grief counselling course. She helps Jade process her feelings about Vicky's death.

== Vicky's ghost ==
Before the start of the novel, Wilson states that many people have asked her if Vicky is really there, or if it is just Jade's imagination. She says that "You will have to make up your own mind!"

- Jade could be imagining Vicky, as she encourages Jade to commit suicide by jumping off a moving train. Since Jade is devastated over Vicky's death and blames herself for it, this could be her imagination.
- Vicky could really be there as, although Jade learns to keep Vicky away from her towards the end of the book, she cannot control Vicky's emotions or actions.
