= Secrets (novel) =

2002 novel by Jacqueline Wilson

- First edition
- Author: Jacqueline Wilson
- Illustrator: Nick Sharrat
- Language: English
- Genre: Young adult fiction
- Publisher: Doubleday
- Publication date: 2002
- Publication place: England
- ISBN: 0-440-86761-4
- OCLC: 70671713

Secrets is a young adult book by Jacqueline Wilson, published in 2002 by Doubleday. Secrets is told from the point of view of two pre-adolescent girls, Treasure and India, via their diary entries. Despite their very different backgrounds - Treasure coming from a violent and abusive household, India having rich but inattentive parents - the girls strike up a friendship and their stories begin to intertwine. The Diary of Anne Frank is frequently referred to in the novel and influences the girls' actions.

== Plot ==
Treasure Mitchell lives with her mother and her abusive stepfather, Terry, who she hates very much. When Terry whips Treasure with his belt over the Christmas period, scarring her forehead, her grandmother Rita puts her foot down and takes Treasure in herself, although she still has nightmares that Terry is coming to get her.

India Upton lives in the upper middle-class, expensive Parkfield Estate, with her parents and her au pair, miserable Australian-born Wanda. Her father, Richard, is a businessman for Major Products with a terrible drinking problem, and her mother, Moya, is a controlling fashion designer who finds India's weight problem particularly embarrassing. India is unpopular at school and her only friend now goes to boarding school. Her only source of comfort is rereading The Diary of Anne Frank, whom she considers her heroine.

One day, after Wanda fails to collect her from school, India decides to walk home. While passing through the Latimer Estate she meets Treasure, and the two hit it off instantly. India is very taken with Treasure's charismatic family, and Treasure is impressed by India's posh lifestyle. Their friendship proves to be the bright spot in both of their lives, as India begins to suspect that her dad is having an affair with Wanda and Treasure receives a phone call from her mum and Terry, telling her that they are coming to take her home.

To protect Treasure, Rita sends her granddaughter and the other kids out of the flat until the coast is clear. However, Treasure is spotted by Terry and has to run away where he can't find her – to India's house. India takes advantage of her family's inattention to hide her friend away in her attic, where she can live "like Anne Frank". She lends the book to Treasure, who begins to idolise Anne as well. Whilst running away from Terry, Treasure dropped her bag containing her Ventolin inhaler, so she has to manage without her inhaler during the time in hiding and this puts her asthma at risk.

Meanwhile, word has spread around the Latimer Estate that Treasure has been abducted. Her mother and stepfather broadcast an appeal on the news, and her neighbour's son, "Mumbly" Michael Watkins, is accused of kidnapping her. Treasure is horrified and wants to go home, knowing that her Nan is worried about her, but India does her best to convince her to stay where she is safe, all the while coping with her own problems, including her father's alcoholism and the fact that Wanda may be pregnant.

When Rita shows up at India's school, demanding to know where Treasure is, India has no choice but to reveal their secret. Her mother is horrified, and scolds her, which results in India revealing Wanda's secret too, out of spite. After Rita promises to keep India's involvement in the incident quiet, and takes Treasure home, Treasure tells her that she is going to tell everyone the truth about Terry. Her revelation on the news leads to a custody battle between her parents and her grandmother, which Rita eventually wins with the aid of a campaign. Treasure's mum declares that she doesn't want Treasure any more because she told the truth about Terry, but they hug each other and Treasure sets out into her new life with Rita.

In the last chapter, India discloses that her parents are getting a divorce after her father narrowly escaped arrest for embezzlement; Wanda was sent back to Australia, allegedly after terminating the pregnancy; and India is in love with her new therapist, Chris, who has encouraged her to pursue a career in psychology. Treasure, meanwhile, is still her best friend: she is now working as a model for India's mum (Moya Upton, the clothes designer), who takes them on a photoshoot to Amsterdam at the end of the story, complete of course with a visit to Anne Frank's attic. The sight of the book makes both girls cry; although they cannot read Dutch, India states that it wasn't necessary as "we both know it by heart".

== Treasure's Side Characters ==
- Treasure: The protagonist of her side of the story, she was abused by her step dad. She is skinny, wears glasses and has asthma. She deeply admires her Nan. After Terry whips her with his belt she moves in with her beloved Nan and her family. She lives on the Latimer estate. When Terry comes to retrieve her she runs away and hides in her new friend India's attic. She has moved all around the country with her mum's boyfriends and is used with being the new girl at school. Treasure is described as tough and strong, but has a soft and sensitive side that she lets those she truly trust see. After Terry's behaviour towards her she finds it hard to trust, but once one earns her trust she lets her beautiful, compassionate true colours shine through like a sweet, lovely rainbow.
- Nan/Rita: Treasure, Britney and Gary's nan; Tammy, Dolly, Waylon, Loretta, Willie and Patsy's mum and Pete's girlfriend. She is very glamorous and young for a grandmother and is deeply admired by her community. According to Treasure she "wouldn't be seen dead in the usual granny gear". At the end of the book she admits that she loves Treasure as much and maybe even more than her own kids. Her real name is Rita but all the kids on the block call her "Nan". She teaches line dancing. She has a warm and welcoming disposition, and will put her own needs at risk to help her beloved family. She is very passionate, and will fight for what she believes in. Nan also has a very loving, soft and kind personality and loves Treasure with all of her beautiful, compassionate heart.
- Pete: He is never encountered during the novel but we are told that he is Nan's beloved boyfriend and Patsy's father, and that he is in prison for manslaughter – he accidentally killed someone who was harassing Nan. He loves Nan very much and is willing to protect her at all costs. His love for Nan has landed him in prison, but it is mentioned that he will be free soon.
- Terry: Treasure's very abusive stepdad. He whips her with his giant belt and is violent to Tammy (Treasure's mum). He comes over soft after being violent, which Tammy falls for every time, and cunningly fakes his emotions to get what he wants from people. His own children are Bethany and Kyle, from a previous relationship, and baby Gary, from his relationship with Tammy. It is mentioned that Bethany and Kyle's mother is in jail for doing drugs.
- Tammy: Treasure and Gary's mum, she stands by Terry no matter what. She has had a lot of boyfriends in her time. She was unhappy to give birth to Treasure, even telling her she was unwanted and that she ruined her life. She occasionally shows that she cares for Treasure, but she frequently prioritises the safety of the abusive Terry over her daughter, even going so far as to deny the fact that Terry whipped Treasure. As far as Nan's concerned, Tammy is "a waste of space". Tammy is ever so sensitive, and lives in fear of Terry's explosive temper, so much so that she risks the safety of her own daughter to keep him happy. Even though she may not always do the right thing for her daughter, she has good morals and appears to struggle from a mental complication.
- Patsy: Nan's youngest and favourite child. She likes Treasure a lot and is Pete's daughter. She wants to be famous and Nan thinks she should go to stage school. She is very good at dancing, doing line dancing, ballet, tap dancing and acrobatics. She has a very adorable and innocent temperament, and while Treasure loves Patsy with all of her heart, sometimes she feels a little angry when Patsy accidentally hurts her feelings, or hits a sensitive spot.
- Willie: Nan's son. He is most likely younger than Loretta and older than Patsy, but in fact an age is never mentioned for him. He attends the local comprehensive school. He has a BMX bike that he lets Treasure borrow when she first meets India. When Treasure first moves in he teases her, but they soon become friends; he is loyal and vows to protect her from Terry. While he prefers to paint a picture of an untouchable, tough boy, he shows affection towards Treasure and is near tears when Terry arrives.
- Loretta: Nan's daughter and Britney's mum. She wants Britney to like her best so as a result she's forever tired. She is fifteen, but she stopped attending school when she had Britney. In contrast to her older sister Tammy, she is pleased to have had a daughter despite her age and looks after it maturely. It is also mentioned that Loretta used to be a dancer before she had Britney. She is determined to give her little Britney the best possible life, despite their scenario. She sometimes gets ever so slightly annoyed at Treasure for being so motherly towards Britney, however, she has a caring nature and uses her determination to keep Treasure as safe as can be.
- Britney: Loretta's baby daughter, thought to be named after Britney Spears. She is described as very pretty, and Treasure prefers Britney to Loretta. Nan says Britney is so cute she should do a spot of modelling for magazines. Treasure can bathe Britney without her making a fuss, unlike Loretta. Treasure is very nurturing towards Britney, and feels a special connection to this sweet little girl.
- Kyle: Terry's son. Makes out he's tough but cries when Treasure gets whipped by Terry. He and Treasure share a special friendship, but he we don't encounter him very much throughout the story.
- Bethany: Terry's daughter. She doesn't get on with Treasure but gives Treasure her designer T-shirt just before she leaves and begins to cry.
- Dolly: Nan's second eldest. Dolly lives in Wales.
- Waylon: Nan's son. He lives in Sydney in Australia.

== India's Side Characters ==
- India: The protagonist of her side of the novel, who lives on a luxury complex called Parkfield. She is bright, thoughtful and articulate. She has frizzy ginger hair and is overweight, which is a constant source of bullying from others, including her own mother. She has no friends at school where she is frequently teased, and her classmates groan when she comes first in tests or expresses herself. She once had a former friend called Miranda but she went to a boarding school and ceased staying in contact with India, leaving her in a position where she is not sure she loves anyone except her idol, Anne Frank. Even though she may sometimes have a slight temper, she is very sensitive and says she wishes others returned her deep emotions and care. When she finds a special friend who does that, she is truly delighted.
- Richard: India's dad. Works for a business called Major Products. India was once very fond of him but her respect for him begins to fade. He has a drinking problem, and India thinks he is having an affair with Wanda. He is under a large amount of stress with his job, and as India describes it, 'he looks as if the weight of the world is balanced on his shoulders'. He may sometimes be gentle and loving towards India, however, the smallest of things could make his emotions change.
- Moya: India's mum. She is a workaholic fashion designer for her children's clothes range, Moya Upton. She is on a permanent, extreme diet that makes her incredibly skinny; India openly speculates that she is anorexic. She is in a constant battle with her daughter about food and frequently accuses her of being a crybaby.
- Wanda: India's au pair, originally from Australia. She is described as skinny and miserable with long black hair and pale spotty skin. She secretly buys India chocolate. She never gains weight even though she eats a lot, to India's dismay. She spends much of her time in the book sleeping or crying. She begins to look ill, vomiting and talking with India's father; Treasure surmises that she is pregnant, and India is afraid it is her father's baby. Wanda, slightly like Tammy, often seems to feel depressed. She and India aren't friends, as she sometimes teases India, but she does supply India with a lot of sweeties.
- Mrs. Winslow: Moya and Richard's cleaning lady. We never see much of her, however when Treasure is hiding in the family's attic, she goes into the kitchen to help herself to food and Mrs. Winslow nearly catches her doing so. She can be a firm but caring character, and it is mentioned that she doesn't behave very friendly towards poor Wanda.
- Phoebe: Phoebe is a small girl with long curly hair and is Moya's main model. She is then put to be a back up model when Treasure becomes the main model for Moya Upton. She is described as very pretty, and poor India envies her small figure and beauty.
- Maria: Maria is one of the two mean girls who bully India at her school. She occasionally shows compassion for India when alone, but makes fun of India's size and interest in Anne Frank when around others.
- Alice: Maria's best friend. Alice always agrees with whatever Maria says, and offers no opinions of her own.
- Miranda: Miranda is never encountered in the novel, but is described as being India's best friend when the two were in primary school. Miranda didn't have a good imagination. India mentions that Miranda left for boarding school and is a fan of Harry Potter. She used to reply to India's letters, but has since discontinued all contact between the two.
- Mrs Gibbs: India's teacher at her private all-girls school. She attempts to be kind to India and prompts her to confide in her about anything that is wrong.
- Mrs. Hedges: the deputy headteacher of India's school.
- Mrs. Blandford: the headteacher of India's school.
