= The Longest Whale Song =

2010 children's novel by Jacqueline Wilson

- Author: Jacqueline Wilson
- Publisher: Doubleday
- Publication date: 30 September 2010
- ISBN: 9780385618151

The Longest Whale Song is a children's novel by Jacqueline Wilson, first published by Doubleday in 2010. It is about a young girl whose interest in a school project on whales helps her cope with life and gives her hope while her mother is in a coma.

== Plot ==
The story is about a young girl called Ella, whose mother is put into a coma after baby brother Samson is born. Ella must face tough times and has to try to carry on a normal life.

In school Ella learns about whales. Ella is fascinated about these mysterious creatures. She falls out with her friends and nothing seems right to Ella but with support from her new kind teacher, she works it out. Her stepdad Jack looks after her and the newborn baby Samson, Ella does not like Jack at first but their relationship grows and they end up caring for each other.

== Main characters ==
The main character and heroine of The Longest Whale Song is Ella. As with many Jacqueline Wilson books, the story depicts a blended family, including her stepdad Jack whom she initially dislikes but gradually develops a bond with during the ordeal; her half-brother, Samson, a newborn baby; and of course her mother, who is in a coma but seems somewhat responsive to the whale songs Ella plays for her. Throughout the story, it becomes clear that Ella manages to cope far better with this situation than the adults in her mum's life, including Jack, her relatives, and friends.

Other characters in the book include Ella's own friends from school and after-school club, some of whom are cruel or disinterested when she needs them the most. She forms a friendship with a boy named Joseph who is kind to her during her mother's illness. There is also a teacher who introduces the school project learning about whales.

== Reception ==
More than one reviewer commented that the story of The Longest Whale Song was "quite sad for a children's book", while also offering humorous moments. The London Evening Standard called it "a surprisingly serious, emotional, and uplifting tale". Recommending the story as "a great read with lots of twists to keep you interested", CBBC Newsround added that "A few more chapters would have been great!" A review in The Sunday Age said that "There's no getting around it, The Longest Whale Song is a sad book but it has a lot to say about hope, friendship and unconditional love. Thankfully there are also a few laughs and lots of interesting facts about...whales."

A review in School Librarian commended the book's depiction of a difficult family situation, saying "the actions and reactions of those around Ella ring true", and concluding "The believability of the story makes it that much more poignant and you are willing her mum to get well." Comparing the book to classics such as Moby Dick and The Old Man and the Sea, The Lincolnshire Echo said that "Jacqueline Wilson manages to write a contemporary account...of how the vast expanse of the sea and all the creatures and wildlife that live within it, provide the answers for solitude and loneliness."
