= Summer Reading Challenge =

British children's competition

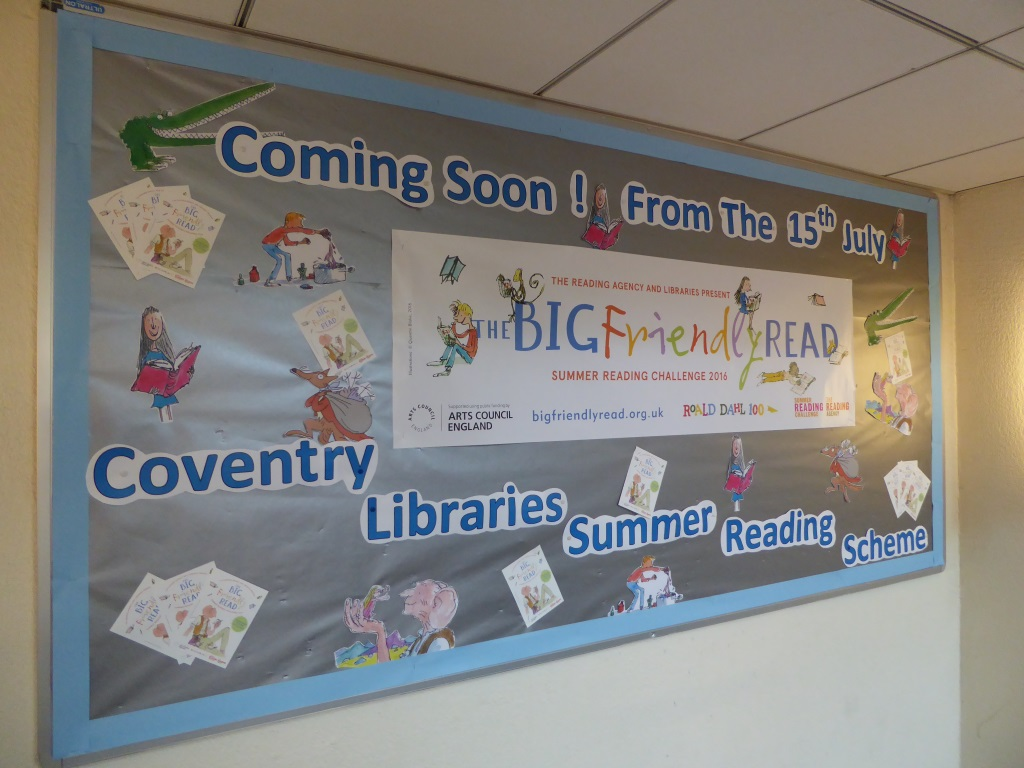
2016's Summer Reading Challenge (which was Roald Dahl-themed) is advertised at a local library in Coventry, England.

The Summer Reading Challenge is an educational competition held annually in public libraries in the United Kingdom, organised by The Reading Agency. It first began in 1999 with the intention of encouraging primary school children to read books during the summer holidays. Participants are awarded stickers and medals based on the competition's theme per tier. Materials are available in large print with supplementary information in Braille. Each year's Challenge is based around a different theme or a specific children's author.

In an Impact Research study for the Summer Reading Challenge, the Reading Agency found that the Challenge contributed to stemming the 'summer holiday dip' in children's reading achievement.

== History ==
The Summer Reading Challenge began in 1999 with Reading Safari.

This initiative was designed to encourage children to read more during their summer holidays. addressing the "summer slide" in literacy. The first theme was "Reading Safari," and it was developed to encourage kids to continue reading during the break when their skills might otherwise decline. The challenge was organized by The Reading Agency, which was established to advocate for libraries and promote reading across the UK.

The program quickly gained traction, with around 450,000 children participating in its first year. The success of this initiative was supported by a national PR campaign and the creation of professional materials to ensure consistency across libraries.

In 2006, the Summer Reading Challenge Impact Research Report was published by an agency called Product Perceptions. The report highlighted that 60% of participating children read more as a direct result of the challenge.

== How it works ==
The child first asks for registration at the library desk with their library card in their hand. They then receive the Summer Reading Challenge Sheet where they track their progress and add stickers to complete the challenge. They read two books at a time from the library, record them on their sheet then show the sheet to the librarian where they get two stickers to put on their sheet (one often being a scratch-n'-sniff). After they have collected all the stickers and read their six books, they receive a medal and a certificate.

== Resources ==
In Wales, most items are available in bilingual Welsh-English versions.

In Scotland, the Summer Reading Challenge is sponsored by Tesco Bank.

The Summer Reading Challenge is also run outside of the UK, in Ireland and internationally through the British Council’s teaching and learning services.

An interactive website for children is available year-round, where they can create a profile, chat about books, and get help on what to read next via the digital Book Sorter. This Book Sorter functionality already offers over 300,000 peer to peer children’s book recommendations in child-friendly categories, added by children themselves, who have read these titles in a Summer Reading Challenge or other activity.

== Themes ==
Year	Theme	About	Notes
1999	Reading Safari		
2000	Reading Relay		
2001	Reading Carnival		
2002	Reading Planet		
2003	Reading Maze		
2004	Reading Rollercoaster		
2005	Reading Voyage		
2006	Reading Mission		
2007	The Big Wild Read	Environment	
2008	Team Read	Sports	to celebrate Beijing Olympics 2008
2009	Questseekers	Fantasy	
2010	Space Hop	Space and astronauts	
2011	Circus Stars	Circus	
2012	Story Lab	Science	
2013	Creepy House	Ghosts	illustrated by Chris Riddell
2014	Mythical Maze	Mythical characters	illustrated by Sarah McIntyre
2015	Record Breakers	World Records	in partnership with Guinness World Records
2016	The Big Friendly READ	Roald Dahl	for 100th anniversary of Roald Dahl
2017	Animal Agents	Detectives	illustrated by Tony Ross
2018	Mischief Makers	BEANO	for BEANO's 80th anniversary
2019	Space Chase	Space	to celebrate the 50th anniversary of the Moon landing
2020	Silly Squad	Comedy	
2021	Wild World Heroes	Eco-Friendly	
2022	Gadgeteers	Science	
2023	Ready, Set, Read	Sports	(Youth Sport Trust)
2024	Marvellous Makers	Arts & crafts	in partnership with Create
2025	Story Garden	Nature	
2026	Read to the Beat	Music	In partnership with Universal Music Group UK

== Opportunities ==
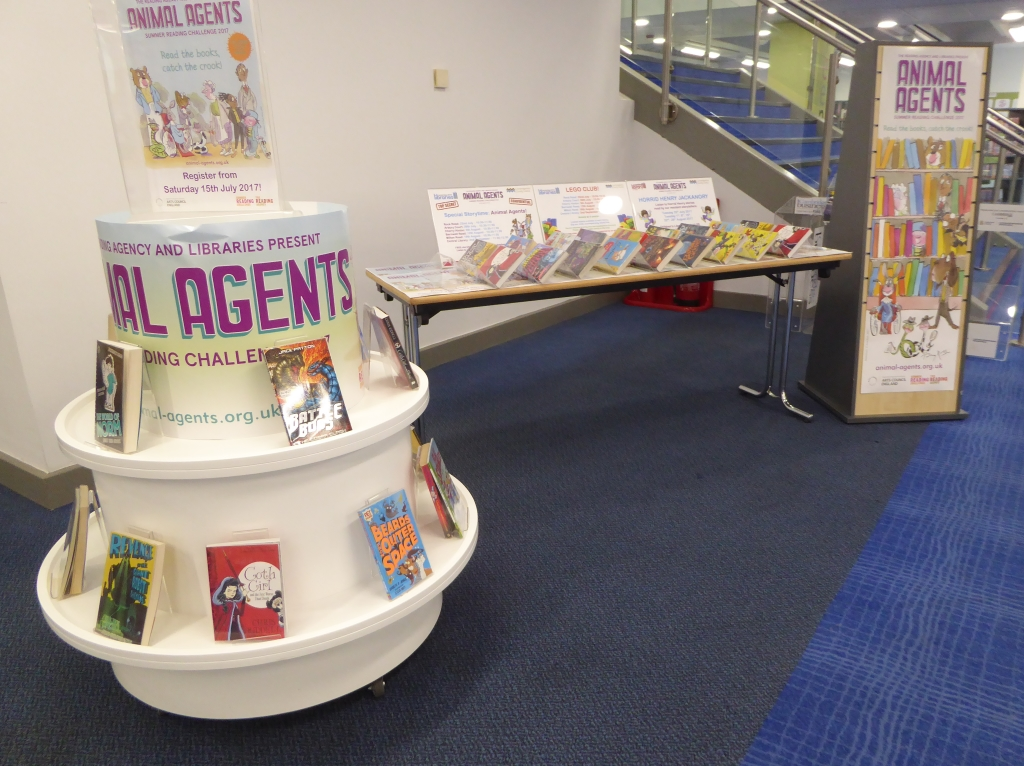
2017's Summer Reading Challenge is promoted in a local library, with 'recommended books'.

Libraries work closely with schools, and each year library staff promote the Challenge to schools in the summer term. Invitations are provided for children to take home to encourage families to take part.

For young people (aged 13 to 24), there is the opportunity to volunteer in libraries during the Summer Reading Challenge each year to support younger children taking part. Many go on to volunteer to support other library initiatives throughout the year.

8,000 young people were expected to volunteer in the 2015 Summer Reading Challenge.

== Regional variations ==
Council library services have to opt in to the Summer Reading Challenge, purchasing materials from The Reading Agency.

Some authorities have traditionally run local alternatives. The London Borough of Croydon ran the Book Trail for many years, which was enjoyed by British rapper Stormzy in his childhood, who in 2016 remembered it as “You read a book, write a detailed review as proof you’ve read it and they give you a badge [...]. That’s where my competitive nature came out. Give me the badges! I would sit in the library all day, not ’cos I loved reading, just because I needed those badges.” Croydon has since also joined the Summer Reading Challenge.

Similar initiatives run internationally, in the USA, services design these locally and are known as Summer Reading Programs.
