= Nick Sharratt =

British writer and illustrator (born 1962)

- Born: 9 August 1962 (age 64); Bexleyheath, Kent, England
- Education: Manchester Polytechnic; St. Martin's School of Art
- Occupations: Author, illustrator
- Website: nicksharratt.com

Nick Sharratt (born 9 August 1962) is a British author and illustrator of children's books, whose work is split between illustrating for writers, most notably Jacqueline Wilson from 1991 to 2021, and Jeremy Strong, but also Giles Andreae, Julia Donaldson and Michael Rosen. He was chosen to be the official illustrator for World Book Day 2006, and has illustrated around 250 books, including over 50 books by Wilson, among them The Lottie Project, Little Darlings and The Story of Tracy Beaker which was the most borrowed library book in the UK for the first decade of the 21st century. The books on which Sharratt and Wilson have collaborated have sold more than 40 million copies in the UK and sales of picture books illustrated by Sharratt exceed 10 million.

== Early life ==
Sharratt was born on 9 August 1962 in Bexleyheath, Greater London, and grew up in Suffolk, Nottinghamshire and Manchester, with his three younger siblings. He attended Manchester Polytechnic (now called Manchester Metropolitan University) where he completed an art foundation course. He was trained in graphic design at St. Martin's School of Art and took his later inspiration from the pop and graphic art of the 1960s, which he experienced as a child.

== Work ==
Sharratt illustrates for children's authors as well as producing his own picture books for a younger audience.

Sharratt's books include Shark in the Park, Ketchup on your Cornflakes?, What's In the Witch's Kitchen?, Don't Put Your Finger in the Jelly, Nelly!, Octopus Socktopus and My Mum and Dad make Me Laugh. With Pippa Goodhart he created the million-selling You Choose. He illustrated Pants, written by Giles Andreae, and Chocolate Mousse for Greedy Goose, Goat Goes to Playgroup and Toddle Waddle by Julia Donaldson. Nick has also written two chapter books, The Cat and the King and Nice Work for the Cat and the King.

Shark in the Park has been turned into a touring theatrical show by Nonsense Room Productions. His animated illustrations were an integral part of the hugely successful CBBC series The Story of Tracy Beaker and Tracy Beaker Returns. Sharratt has a touring exhibition, 'Pirates, Pants and Wellyphants', which has been seen by 140,000 visitors to date.

== Awards ==
Sharratt has won numerous awards including the Red House Children's Book Award, the Nestle Children's Book Award, The Right Start Award (book category), the Under Fives non-fiction She/WHSmith Award and the Educational Writers Award. He has won regional library book prizes in Nottingham, Norfolk, Oxfordshire, Perth, Sheffield, Stockport, Southampton, Portsmouth and Somerset, was shortlisted for the Kate Greenaway Medal in 2002 and is a fellow of Hereford College of Art. He is also a recipient of a gold Blue Peter badge. Sharratt's work has been exhibited in Britain, Italy, Japan and the US.

== Bibliography ==
- I Went to the Zoopermarket
- Ketchup on your Cornflakes?
- Ouch, I need a Plaster!
- Don't Put Your Finger in the Jelly, Nelly!
- A Cheese and Tomato Spider
- Eat Your Peas
- Shark in the Park
- My Mum and Dad Make Me Laugh
- What's in the Witch's Kitchen?
- Pants
- More Pants
- Dear Mother Goose
- The Big Book of Crazy Mix-Ups
- Mixed-Up Fairy Tales
- You Choose
- The Green Queen
- Caveman Dave
- Mrs Pirate
- The Pointy-Hatted Princesses
- Monday Runday
- Chocolate Mousse for Greedy Goose
- Hippo has a Hat
- Toddle Waddle
- Something Beginning with Blue
- Red Rockets and Rainbow Jelly
- One to Ten and Back Again
- Faster, Faster, Nice and Slow
- Alphabet Ice Cream
- Mr Pod and Mr Piccalilli
- The Big Book of Magical Mix-Ups
- Elephant Wellyphant
- Octopus Socktopus
- Moo-Cow, Kung-fu-Cow
- One Fluffy Baa-Lamb, Ten Hairy Caterpillars
- One Mole Digging a Hole
- Never Shake a Rattlesnake
- Wriggle and Roar
- The Gooey Chewy Rumble Plop Book
- The Icky Sticky Snot and Blood Book
- Socks
- What Do I Look Like?
- Look What I've Found
- Caveman Dave (1994)
- Where Babies Come From (1997)
