= Jacqueline Wilson =

English novelist (born 1945)

Dame Jacqueline Wilson GBE FRSL
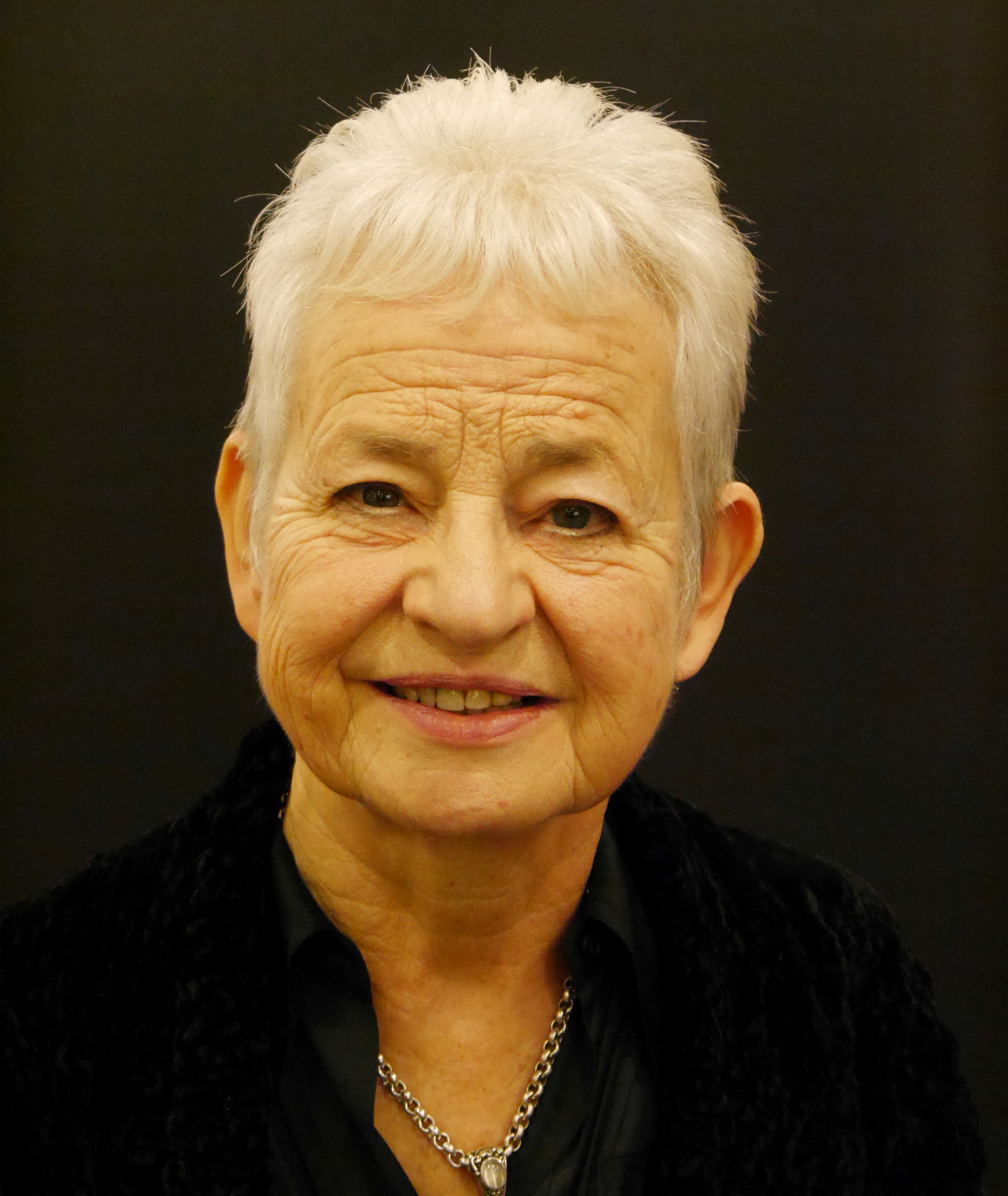
- Wilson in 2019
- Born: Jacqueline Aitken; 17 December 1945 (age 80); Bath, Somerset, England
- Occupation: Writer
- Spouse: William Millar Wilson (m. 1965; div. 2004)
- Partner: Trish Beswick (since 2002)
- Children: Emma Wilson
- Writing career
- Period: 1969–present
- Genre: Realist
- Notable works: Cookie; Candyfloss; Double Act; The Story of Tracy Beaker; Hetty Feather; Love Frankie
- Notable awards: Guardian Prize; 2000; British Book Award; 2000, 2003
- Website: jacquelinewilson.co.uk

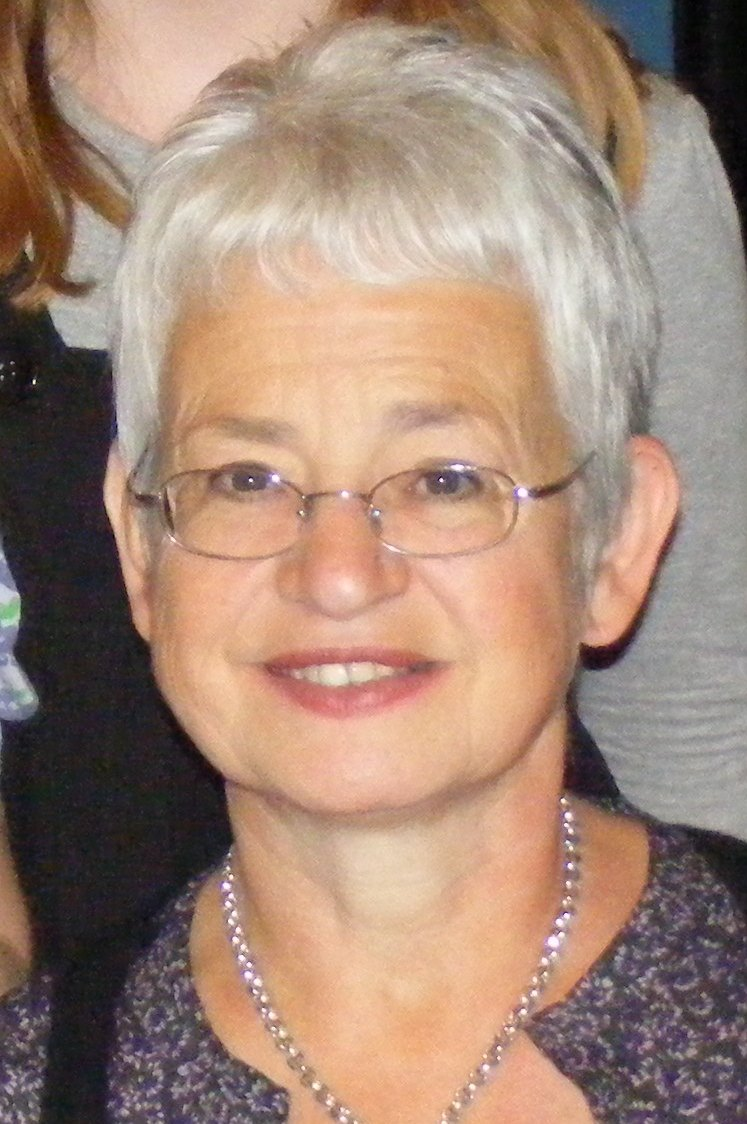
Wilson in 2009

Dame Jacqueline Wilson (née Aitken; born 17 December 1945) is an English novelist known for her children's literature. Her novels have tackled realistic topics such as adoption, abuse, and divorce. Since her debut novel in 1969, Wilson has written more than 100 books.

== Early life ==
Jacqueline Aitken was born in Bath, Somerset, on 17 December 1945. Her father, Harry, was a civil servant and her mother, Margaret "Biddy" (née Clibbens), was an antiques dealer. Jacqueline particularly enjoyed books by Noel Streatfeild, as well as American classics such as Little Women and What Katy Did. At the age of nine, she wrote her first "book", "Meet the Maggots", which was 21 pages long. Wilson was given the nickname "Jacky Daydream" at school, which she later used as the title of her autobiography, telling of her life as a primary school-aged child.

Wilson attended Coombe Girls' School in Surrey and Carshalton Technical College. After leaving school at the age of 16, she began training as a secretary but then applied to work with the Dundee-based publishing company DC Thomson on a new girls' magazine, Jackie. Wilson has claimed the magazine was named after her.

== Career ==
When Wilson began to focus on writing, she completed several crime fiction novels before dedicating herself to children's books. At the age of 40, she took A-level English and earned a grade A. She had mixed success with about 40 books before the breakthrough to fame in 1991 with The Story of Tracy Beaker, published by Doubleday.

As her children's novels frequently feature themes of adoption, divorce and mental illness, they tend to attract controversy, yet are well loved by children and adults alike.

=== University of Roehampton and charity work ===
In June 2013, Wilson was appointed a professorial fellow of the University of Roehampton, and a Pro-Chancellor. In February 2014, it was announced that she would be appointed Chancellor of the university (its honorary figurehead) from August 2014. She was reappointed in 2017 for a further three years. She teaches modules in both the Children's Literature and Creative Writing master's degree (MA) programmes offered by the university. She concluded her term as Chancellor in August 2020.

Wilson is patron of the charity Momentum in Kingston upon Thames, south London, which helps children undergoing treatment for cancer (and their families), and also a patron of the Letterbox Club, a BookTrust initiative. Until she moved away from Kingston-upon-Thames, she was a patron of the Friends of Richmond Park.

== Reception ==
In The Big Read, a 2003 poll conducted by the BBC, four of Wilson's books were ranked among the 100 most popular books in the UK: The Story of Tracy Beaker (1991), Double Act (1995), Girls In Love (1997) and Vicky Angel (2000). Fourteen books by Wilson ranked in the top 200. In 2002, she replaced Catherine Cookson as the most borrowed author in Britain's libraries, a position she retained until being overtaken by James Patterson in 2008.

== Accolades ==
Wilson has won many awards including the Smarties Prize and the Guardian Children's Fiction Prize, a book award judged by a panel of British children's writers. The Illustrated Mum (1999) won the annual Guardian Prize and the annual British Book Award for Children's Book of the Year; it also made the 1999 Whitbread Awards shortlist. The Story of Tracy Beaker won the 2002 Blue Peter People's Choice Award and Girls in Tears was the Children's Book of the Year at the 2003 British Book Awards. Two of her books were "Highly Commended" runners-up for the annual Carnegie Medal: The Story of Tracy Beaker (1991) and Double Act (1995). (Note: Since 1995, there are usually eight books on the Carnegie shortlist. CCSU lists 32 "Highly Commended" runners-up for the Carnegie Medal from 1966 to 2002 but only three before 1979 when the distinction became approximately annual. There were 29 "HC" books in 24 years including Wilson alone for 1991 and 1995.)

In the 2002 Birthday Honours, Wilson was appointed an Officer of the Order of the British Empire (OBE) "for services to Literacy in Schools", and from 2005 to 2007 she served as the fourth Children's Laureate. In that role, Wilson urged parents and carers to continue reading aloud to children long after they are able to read for themselves. She also campaigned to make more books available for blind people and campaigned against cutbacks in children's television drama.

In October 2005, she received an honorary degree from the University of Winchester in recognition of her achievements in and on behalf of children's literature. In July 2007, the University of Roehampton awarded her an Honorary Doctorate (Doctor of Letters) in recognition of her achievements in and on behalf of children's literature. She has also received honorary degrees from the University of Dundee, the University of Bath and Kingston University.

In the 2008 New Year Honours, Wilson was promoted to a Dame Commander of the Order of the British Empire (DBE) "for services to Literature". In July 2012, Dame Jacqueline was also elected an honorary fellow of Corpus Christi College, Cambridge. In 2017, she received the Special Award at the BAFTA Children's Awards. In the 2025 New Year Honours, Wilson was promoted again, to a Dame Grand Cross of the Order of the British Empire (GBE) "for services to Literature".

For her lifetime contribution as a children's writer, Wilson was a UK nominee for the international Hans Christian Andersen Award in 2014.

A lecture hall at Kingston University's Penrhyn Road campus has been named after her.

== Works ==
=== Adaptations ===
A dramatisation of Wilson's Double Act, written and directed by Vicky Ireland, was first performed at The Polka Theatre in Wimbledon, London from 30 January to 12 April 2003 and toured throughout the UK. The playscript was published by Collins Plays Plus. Ireland has also written dramatisations of The Lottie Project (performed at Polka Theatre and San Pol Theatre, Madrid), Midnight, Bad Girls and Secrets, which were also commissioned by the Polka Theatre, and a dramatisation of The Suitcase Kid which was performed at the Orange Tree Theatre, Richmond and later toured throughout the UK. The scripts for these plays were published by Nick Hern Books.

The following books by Wilson have been adapted for television:

- Cliffhanger (1995, Channel 4). Part of Look, See and Read, two-part drama.
- Double Act (2002, Channel 4). Starring twins Zoe and Chloe Tempest-Jones as Ruby and Garnet, with a special appearance by Jacqueline Wilson as the casting director at the auditions. This was a one-off 100-minute feature.
- The Story of Tracy Beaker (2002–2006, CBBC). Starring Dani Harmer as Tracy and Lisa Coleman (whose sister, Charlotte, appeared in Double Act as Miss Debenham) as Cam. Original broadcast dates: 8 January 2002 – 9 February 2006. Originally the series was broadcast as stand-a-lone 15 minute episodes between 2002 and 2004 before two 15 minute episodes were edited together in a half our time block on the CBBC channel with certain scenes deleted and Series 1 and 2 being broadcast out of sequence compared to the original broadcast. Series 4 & 5 were made as 11 (series 4) and 10 (series 5) double half hour episodes. The unedited 2002-2004 episodes have been broadcast on CBBC since 2007 but iPlayer uses the edited 2004 episodes of series 1-3.
- The Illustrated Mum (2003, Channel 4). Starring former EastEnders star Michelle Collins as Marigold Westward, who won a BAFTA Award for her role, and who went on to play Stella Price in Coronation Street, Alice Connor as Dolphin Westward and Holly Grainger as Star Westward. This was a four-part mini-series but later shown as a full feature with no ad breaks. It was again repeated at Christmas 2004. Original broadcast date: 5 December 2003.
- Best Friends (2004, ITV). This was a six-part miniseries, but was originally broadcast as one feature with a slightly different ending. It starred Chloe Smyth as Gemma and Poppy Rogers as Alice. Original broadcast date: 3 December 2004. This was repeated on the CITV Channel on 6 March 2010.
- Girls in Love (ITV). Starring Olivia Hallinan as Ellie, Zaraah Abrahams as Magda and Amy Kwolek as Nadine. There have been two series of Girls in Love broadcast. Original broadcast dates: 1 April 2003 – 18 April 2005.
- Dustbin Baby (BBC). Featuring an A-list cast including Juliet Stevenson as Marion, David Haig as a new character, Elliot, and Dakota Blue Richards as April. Original broadcast date: 21 December 2008.
- Tracy Beaker Returns (2010–2012). This is a series in which Tracy (Dani Harmer) returns to the "Dumping Ground" (Stowey House, since moved to Elm Tree House) to earn money for her new book because she used Cam's credit card without permission to publish it; she was arrested, but Cam decided not to press charges as long as the money was paid back in full. She realises that Elm Tree House has changed and the new children act just like she did herself in her days. At times, she tries to help the children, concluding in the new social workers almost firing her. But sometimes she only gets the child's part of the story, then being told the whole thing and being totally confused and outraged.
- The Tracy Beaker Survival Files (2011–2012). A spin-off series where Tracy teaches lessons about various subjects using her stories from the past and clips from The Story of Tracy Beaker and Tracy Beaker Returns. Original broadcast date: 17 December 2011 to 6 January 2012.
- The Dumping Ground (2013–). The continued life at the Dumping Ground after Tracy Beaker moves on to a new care home and focuses more on just one child in the care home. Not a book by Jacqueline Wilson but inspired by the Tracy Beaker novels.
- The Dumping Ground Survival Files (2014–2020). A spin-off and continuation of the Tracy Beaker Survival Files, where the Dumping Ground kids teach lessons about various subjects using stories that have happened to them and their friends in the past, using clips from Tracy Beaker Returns and The Dumping Ground.
- Hetty Feather (2015–2020). Stars Isabel Clifton as Hetty Feather, living her life in the Foundling Hospital and, later at the end of the third series, starting her life as a maid in service.
- The Dumping Ground: I'm... (2016–2021). A spin-off series similar to the Survival Files, but instead where the characters make videos about themselves, who they are, what they like and stuff that's happened to them in their life.
- Katy was made into a three-part TV series, Katy, broadcast on CBBC from 13 March 2018 to 16 March 2018. Chloe Lea, who played Katy went on to play Viv in The Dumping Ground, the continuation of Tracy Beaker Returns.
- Four Children and It was adapted into a feature film named Four Kids and It.
- My Mum Tracy Beaker was adapted into a three-part television series for CBBC, My Mum Tracy Beaker, from 12 February 2021 to 14 February 2021. It was originally three parts, but it was shown the following week on BBC One as a feature film.
- We Are The Beaker Girls (2021–2023) was adapted into a television series, also for CBBC, The Beaker Girls, in December 2021, which shows Tracy and her life after she gets over her break-up with Sean Godfrey.
- Little Darlings was adapted into a television series, for Sky Kids, in February 2022. This followed the two lives of Destiny and Sunset, both children of Danny Kilman, a has-been rockstar. Destiny lives in a council house with her mum, who is wanting to meet Danny again.
- The Primrose Railway Children (2021) was adapted into a television series for CBBC and was released as a feature film on December 1st before being reaired as a 3 part miniseries. It is a modern reimagining of the railway children and follows the Robinson family moving near Primrose train station and the adventures that follow.

== Personal life ==
Jacqueline began a relationship with printer Millar Wilson, whom she married in 1965 at the age of 19. Two years later they had a daughter, Emma. After three decades, her husband left her for another woman. They divorced in 2004.

In 2008, Wilson was diagnosed with heart failure, after which she had a "major heart surgery". Then in 2013, she was diagnosed with stage three kidney disease. Connected to a haemodialysis machine, she wrote her 100th book with just her left hand. Wilson later had a kidney transplant.

In April 2020, Wilson announced that she was in a same-sex relationship with bookshop owner Trish Beswick, to whom she dedicated a book. Wilson revealed that she had been living with Trish for 18 years. The couple live in East Sussex. In September 2024, she stated that she was delighted to be seen as a gay icon after coming out. "I'm very touched to be thought of as a gay icon, it's an absolute delight", she said after publishing her adult novel Think Again.

Jacqueline has a pet dog and a pet cat. She has a large room of toys in her house. At an author's talk at Canterbury Festival in October 2026, when asked how she would feel if fans sent her garden gnomes to celebrate the publication of her new novel, Esme Pepper, Wilson replied that she would find the gesture very kind, particularly as her partner is a keen gardener. At the same event she said that she would be thrilled if she ever were invited to be on Celebrity Traitors and that she had turned down the opportunity to be on I'm a Celebrity Get Me Out of Here.

== Notes ==
Cultural offices
Preceded by Michael Morpurgo	Children's Laureate of the United Kingdom; 2005–2007	Succeeded by Michael Rosen
