= Girls in Love =

Girls in Love may refer to:

- Girls in Love (novel), a novel by Jacqueline Wilson
- Girls in Love (TV series), a British teen drama series, based on the novel
- Girls in Love, a 1997 song by Wolfgang Voigt under the alias Grungerman
