= HGSS =

HGSS may refer to:

- Croatian Mountain Rescue Service (HGSS - Hrvatska gorska služba spašavanja)
- Holmer Green Senior School, a secondary school in Buckinghamshire, England
- Hougang Secondary School, a secondary school in Hougang, Singapore
- Pokémon HeartGold and SoulSilver, remakes of Pokémon Gold and Silver originally released in 2009 for Nintendo DS
- Homantin Government Secondary School, a secondary school in Hong Kong
