= Julian Kay =

British actor (born 1974)

- Born: August 1974 (age 51); York, North Yorkshire, England
- Occupation: Actor
- Years active: 1996–present
- Spouse: Kate Hampson

Julian Kay (born August 1974) is a British actor who is best known for playing PC Tom Allen in Season 5 & Season 6 of BBC One drama Dangerfield, Mr Green in two seasons of ITV's adaptation of Jacqueline Wilson's Girls In Love and Tracy Barlow's husband Robert Preston in Coronation Street.

He is also known for his roles as Dylan Parker in The Long Shadow, Tony Smith in two seasons of Meet The Richardsons and Toby Jackson in Emmerdale.

Kay attended Bootham School in York, England, before training at the University of Birmingham and Guildford School of Acting.

Kay is married to British actress Kate Hampson and lives in York. They have two children.

== Personal life ==
Kay grew up in York, North Yorkshire. He currently divides his time between bases in York and London. Kay’s Mother and Father were both lawyers.

== Filmography ==
Year	Title	Role	Notes
1996, 1999, 2003	Coronation Street	Robert Preston	Recurring role
1997	Emmerdale	Gerry	Episode 2276
1998	Peak Practice	Paramedic	Episode: "Through a Glass Darkly"
1998	Coming Home	Naval Rating Grant	TV Miniseries
1998–1999	Dangerfield	PC Tom Allen	Series regular, 22 episodes
2001	Oblivious	Secret Hitman	3 episodes
2003–2005	Girls in Love	Mr Green	Series regular
2004	The Face at the Window	PC Jackson	TV
2004	Vincent	Kieron Maguire	Episode 1.1
2004	Casualty	David Haley	Episode: "To Be a Parent"
2007	Life on Mars	Doctor	Episode 2.1
2007	The Royal	Colin Hodges	Episode: "Hoping for the Best"
2007	Britz	DC Winner	Two-part drama
2008	First Contact	Darren Dork	BBC Learning
2009	All About You	Pete Baldwin	Lead Role
2010	Hollyoaks	Alan	Episode 2811
2012	Secrets and Words	Mr Grant	Episode: "Love Letters"
2016	The Hunter’s Prayer	DS Shackcloth	Feature Film
2017
2017	Ackley Bridge	Gary Williams – Head of St Marks	Episode 1.5
2018	The Worst Witch	Cyril/Sid	Episode: "Tortoise Trouble"
2020	Emmerdale	Toby Jackson	3 episodes
2021	The Syndicate	PC Taylor	Episode 4.4
2023	Meet the Richardsons	Computer Guy	Episode 4.5
2023	The Long Shadow	Dylan Parker	Episode 6
2024	Meet the Richardsons	Tony Smith	Episode 5.4 Episode 5.7
2025	High Hoops	Lead Singer - Boys of Fear	Season 2
