= Holmer Green =

Village in Buckinghamshire, England

Coordinates: 51.6654°N 0.6943°W

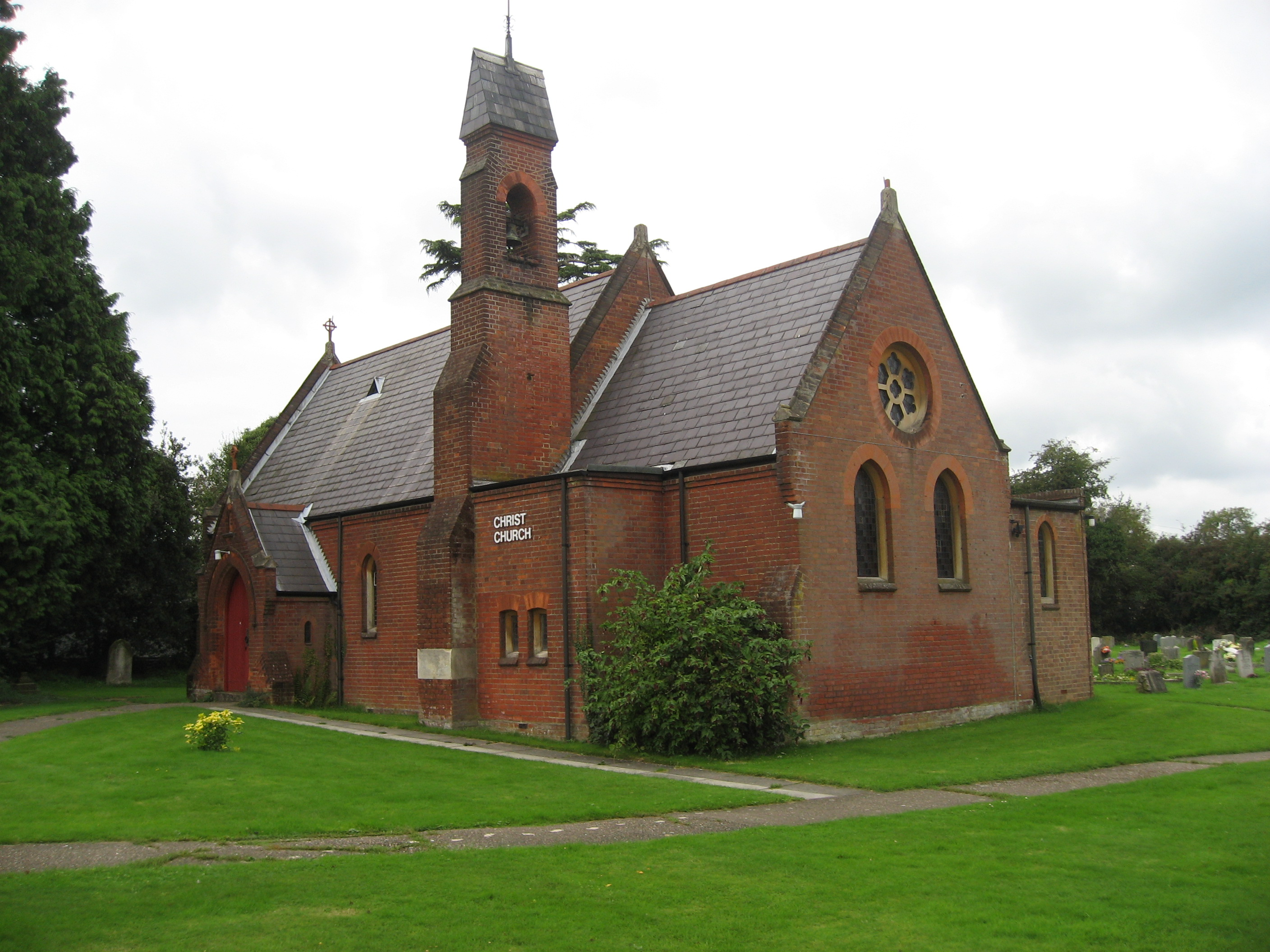
- Christ Church parish church

- Location within Buckinghamshire
- Population: 4,077 (2001 Census)
- OS grid reference: SU904971
- Civil parish: Little Missenden
- Unitary authority: Buckinghamshire
- Ceremonial county: Buckinghamshire
- Region: South East
- Country: England
- Sovereign state: United Kingdom
- Post town: High Wycombe
- Postcode district: HP15
- Dialling code: 01494
- Police: Thames Valley
- Fire: Buckinghamshire
- Ambulance: South Central
- UK Parliament: Chesham & Amersham
- Website: Little Missenden Parish Council

Holmer Green is a village in the civil parish of Little Missenden, in Buckinghamshire, England. It is next to Hazlemere, about 3 miles (5 km) south of Great Missenden.

== History ==
Holmer Green is named after the manor of Holmer that covered a significant part of the parish of Little Missenden in the Middle Ages. The early history of the village is essentially one of people moving out of Little Missenden over the centuries and settling on a large area of heath (now vanished) known as Wycombe Heath or Holmer Heath. The 'Holmer' part of the toponym was first recorded as Holeme in 1208 and is probably derived from Old English. It is commonly thought to derive from 'mere in a hollow' which would refer to Holmer Pond. However, there are certain factors that do not support this theory and the -mer element may actually translate to an Old English word meaning 'boundary'. The 'Green' part of the name refers to a large and ancient Green, probably dating from the 13th century that used to exist here but was reduced to a size of only 4 acres (1.6 ha) in 1854.

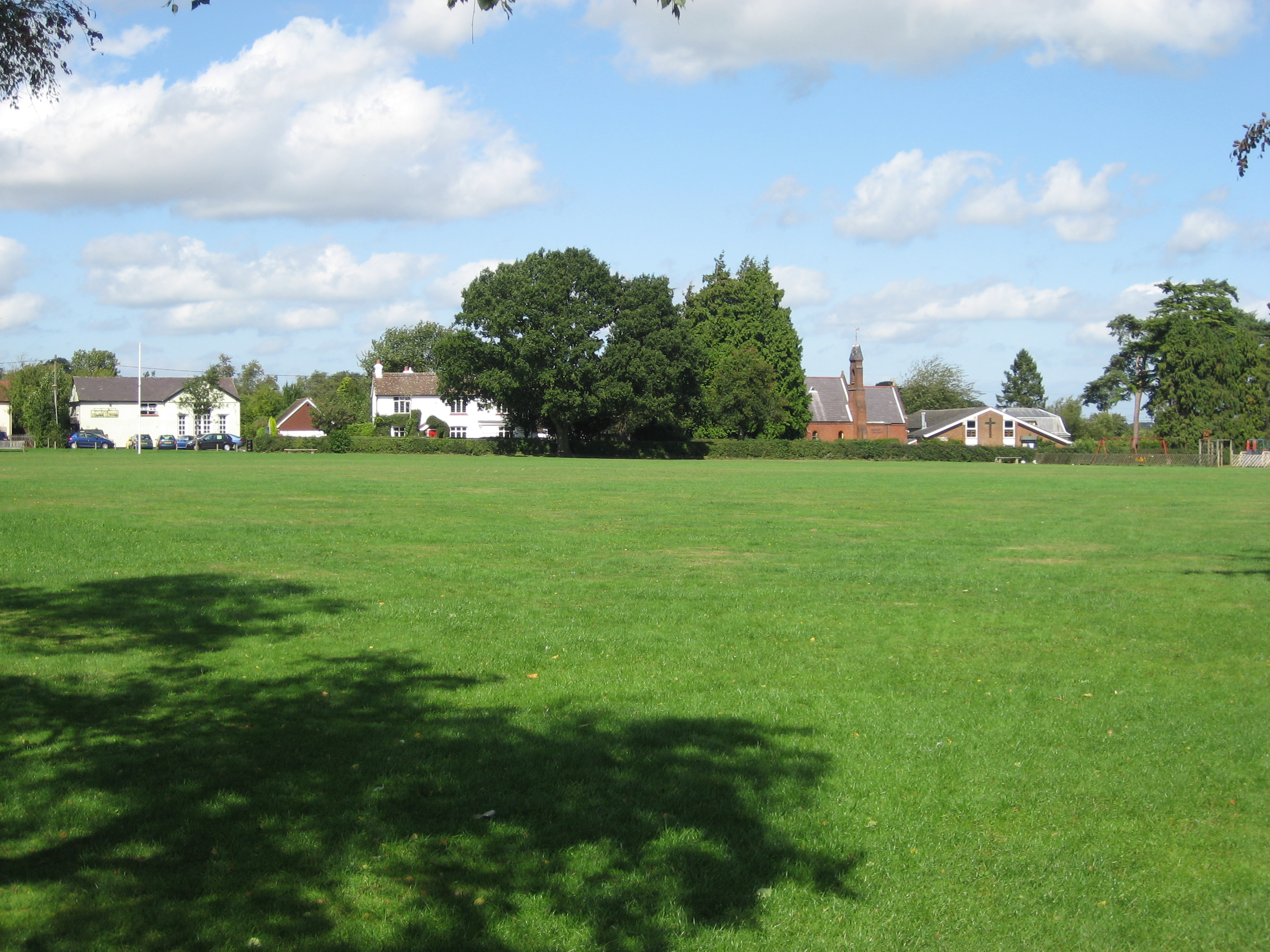
The Common at Holmer Green showing the village hall and parish church

The site of the original medieval manor house of Holmer remains obscure, although local historians McLain-Smith and Riches have suggested its location at a moated site in nearby Colemans Wood where they have excavated medieval pottery.

The oldest houses are The Old Rookery, Hollands Farm and Penfold, all of which probably date from the early 16th century when the hamlet thrived due to sheep farming. The Grade II-listed, brick and flint, Holmer Ridings, now a manor and equestrian facility, was built ca. 1728 as a hunting lodge and has been fully restored.

In the hundred years between 1850 and 1950, the village became well known locally for its cherry orchards, and there remain many references to orchards and cherries in road names and house names.

In 2008 the village formally celebrated 800 years of recorded settlement.

== Social and Community ==
The village underwent housing development during the 1960s and early 1970s and now has about 4,000 inhabitants (almost double that of neighboring Little Missenden). The big developments of the 1960s and 1970s included an expanded range of shops around Turners Place, the Winter's Way estate, the Fox Road and Harries Way estate and the Holmer Court estate (Clementi Avenue). A significant number of newcomers to the village came from Middlesex during that period.

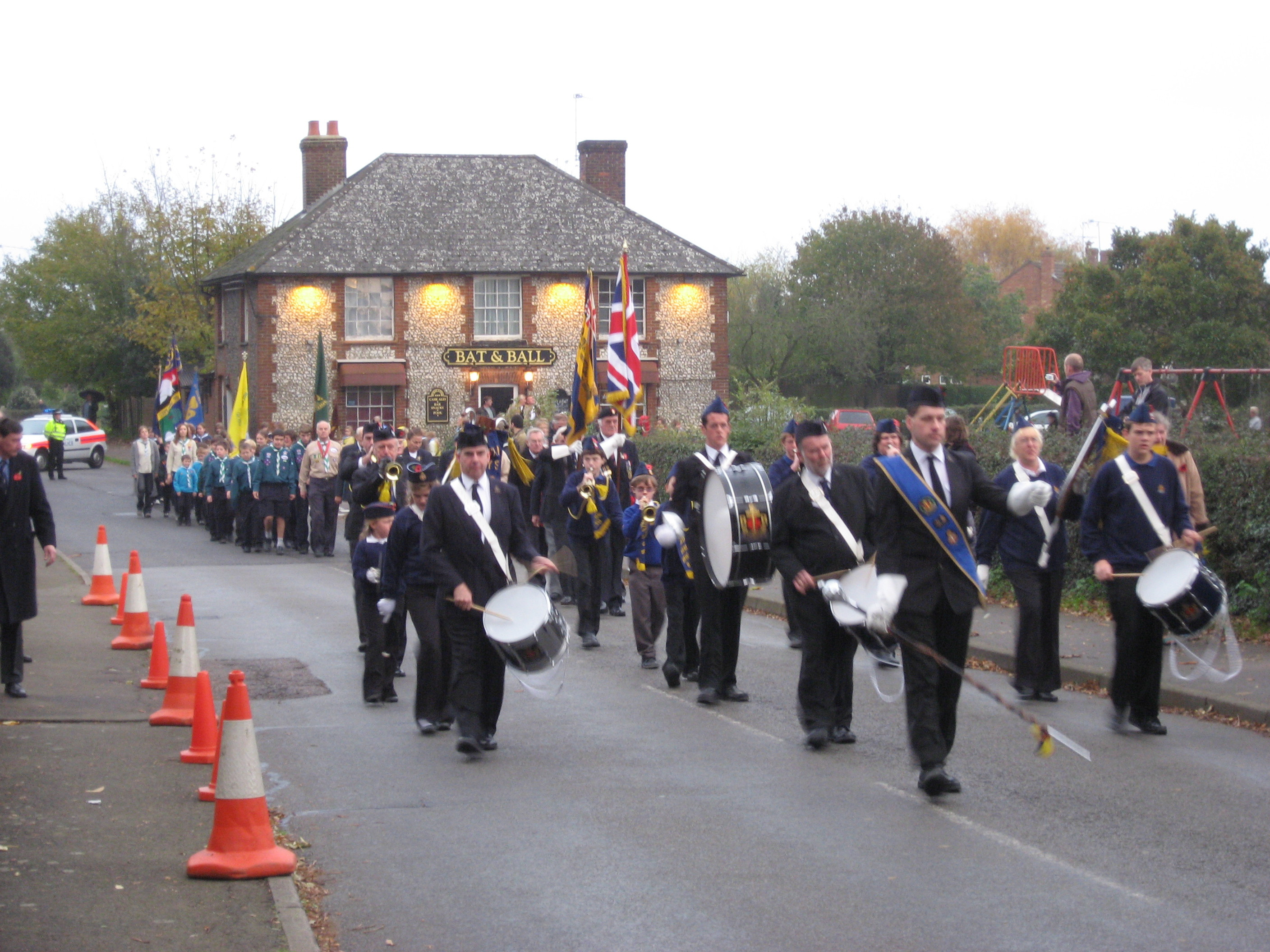
The annual Holmer Green Remembrance Day parade

The village has two centres: a commercial centre based around the shops and central crossroads; and a community-oriented centre based around The Common featuring two churches, the village hall, a school, a pub, a children's playground, and The Common itself.

Holmer Green's most desirable roads range from older roads like Watchet Lane and Penfold Lane through to newer developments like Mead Park. The village's most famous residents are television presenter Fern Britton and her husband, celebrity chef Phil Vickery.

Residents jealously guard the village's independence from the Wycombe-based urban sprawl next door. Maintenance of an independent community separate from the Wycombe conurbation has been helped not only by the village's historic connections with the Missendens, Penn Street and Amersham but also by the presence in the village of a full range of amenities including: pre-schools; primary and secondary schools; three different Christian denomination churches (Church of England, Baptist, Methodist); a dental practice; three pubs (The Bat and Ball, The Earl Howe and The Old Oak); two social clubs (The British Legion and Holmer Green Sports Association); and significant sports facilities. The village lost its only GP practice in 2018 when the lease on the surgery premises expired.

== Sport and recreation ==
The sporting activities hosted by the Holmer Green Sports Association (HGSA) are an important feature of village life. Football is particularly popular and very well established:Non-League football team Holmer Green F.C. celebrated its centenary in 2008 and there are numerous football teams for all age groups – male and female – that play on the four scaled football pitches and two mini pitches.

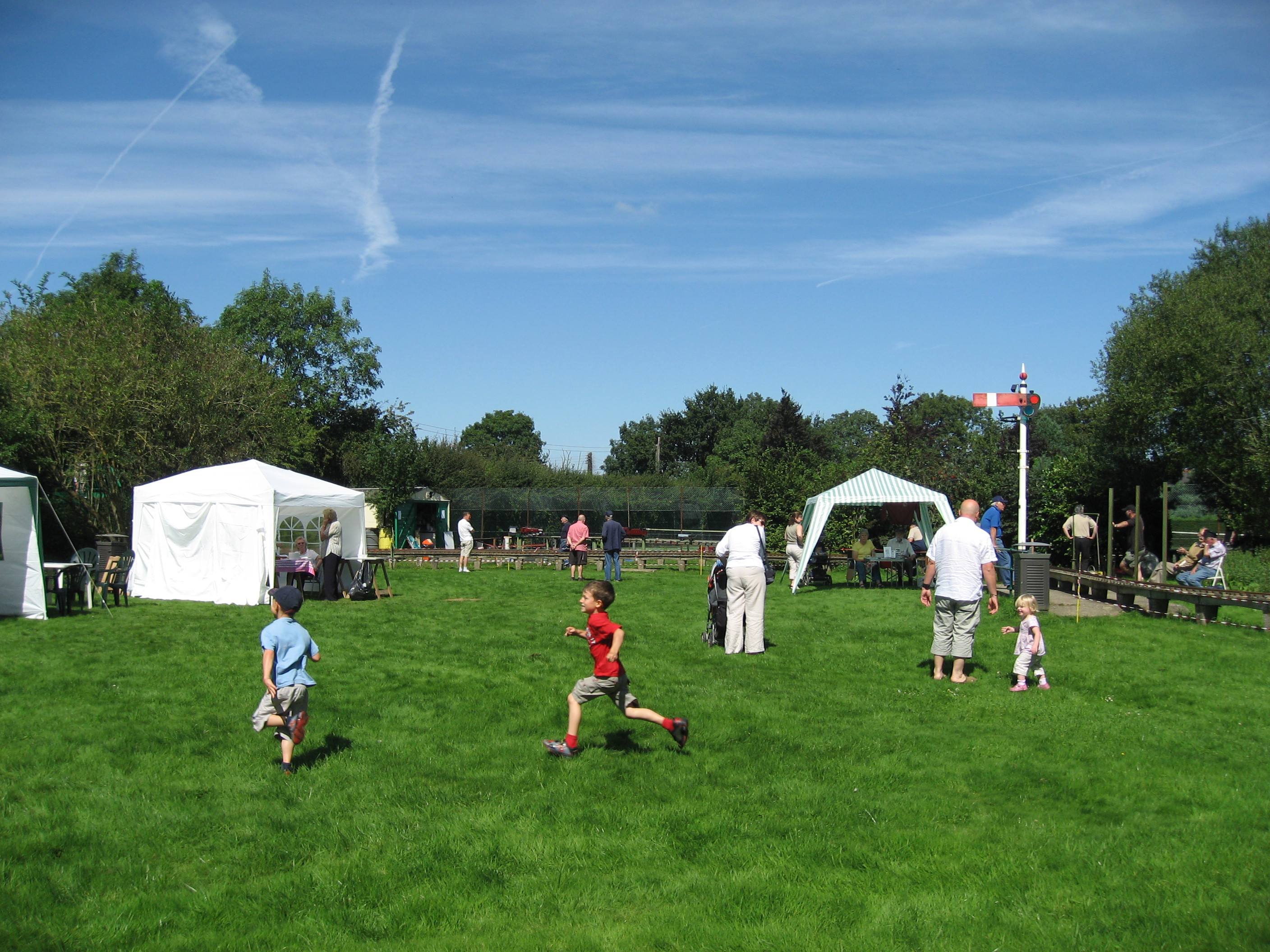
Holmer Green miniature railway

The grounds and facilities at HGSA in Watchet Lane have been used to host training sessions for England teams and for Wycombe Wanderers, and have recently been awarded FA Community Charter status. Football matches and training sessions for some village teams are also held on The Common. Wycombe Wanderers are in League One.

Other sports at HGSA are: a Padel Tennis club and facilities consisting of two Padel tennis courts which were built in 2021; a Squash club and courts; a Cricket club and cricket square; and a Short Mat Bowls club with a 3-rink outdoor green.

Surrounded as it is by Metropolitan Green Belt countryside, Holmer Green village is well placed for walking, horse riding, and cycling – the Chiltern Heritage Cycling Trail runs right through the centre of the village.

A funfair is held on The Common for several days in May and September.

== Places of interest ==
- Holmer Green Miniature Railway, run by the High Wycombe Model Engineering Club
- Penn Wood, a 450-acre (180 ha) woodland on Holmer Green's southern fringe managed by the Woodland Trust

== Education ==
Holmer Green has several pre-schools including: Holmer Green Methodist Pre-School; the Cherry Tree Pre-School; the Village Centre Pre-School; and Playmates Day Nursery.

Holmer Green First School (ages 4–7) and Holmer Green Junior School (ages 7–11) are part of a cluster of local primary schools used by Holmer Green families. A significant proportion of villagers use the Holmer Green schools while others make use of spare places at Little Kingshill School and the Church of England schools at Penn Street and Great Kingshill.

In 2006 Holmer Green Junior School led this cluster of schools at Key Stage 2 and came joint-tenth in the county for aggregated score. Previously, Little Kingshill School led the group. All four primary schools are consistently in the top half of KS2 results in Buckinghamshire.

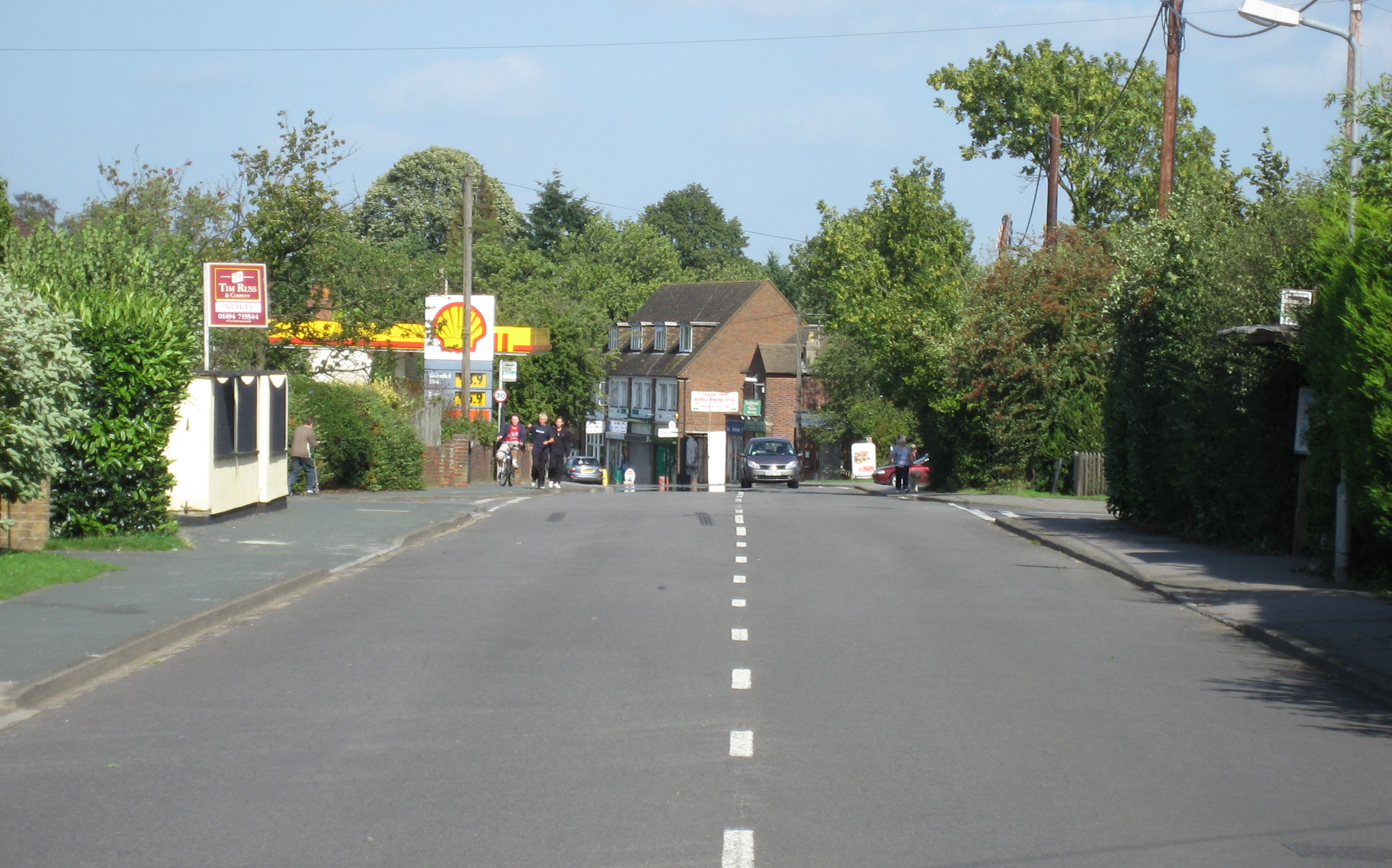
Holmer Green shops from Browns Road

Most Holmer Green children who are not selected for grammar school under Buckinghamshire's 11+ selective system go to either Holmer Green Senior School or to the Sir William Ramsay School (in Hazlemere) which share a common catchment area. A smaller number go to the Misbourne School and the Amersham School despite both being out of catchment.

Local pupils selected for grammar school at age 11 – about a third of all those who sit the test – have customarily attended Amersham and Chesham schools: Dr Challoner's Grammar School (boys), Dr Challoner's High School (girls) and Chesham Grammar School (mixed). New catchment areas were implemented by Buckinghamshire Local Education Authority in 2004 so that selected pupils may now attend The Royal Grammar School (boys), Beaconsfield High School (girls), or Wycombe High School (girls). Some selected pupils still choose to attend Chesham Grammar School and John Hampden Grammar School (boys) despite both now being out of catchment. In recent years, Year 7 children who qualify for grammar school under Bucks' late transfer procedure (known colloquially as "The 12+") have been able to win places at Chesham Grammar School.

A number of private schools are available in nearby villages and towns. The Gateway School (primary), the Claires Court Schools (for which there is a coach to & from Holmer Green) and Pipers Corner School (primary and secondary girls) are popular with villagers who choose the independent sector.

== Religion ==
According to the 2001 Census, 77.8% of Holmer Green's population is Christian, while both Sikhism and Buddhism have 0.2% each. 0.3% of Holmer Green's inhabitants identified as Jewish, while 0.6% identified as Muslims. Alternative religions made up 0.1% of the population, while 14% identified as atheists and 75 did not state a religion.

This overwhelming majority of Christians is also reflected in the places of worship. While, previously, Holmer Green has had 3 Churches, an Anglican church, a Baptist church and a Methodist church, following Covid-19 the Methodist church announced that it would be shutting down. Then, it announced it final closure was not guaranteed and as of 2024, its current and future status is currently ambiguous to even its own churchgoers. Meanwhile, the Baptist church focuses on bringing Children into the church, partnering often with the next door Holmer Green Junior School, running events such as messy church, in which children do activities and can participate in small prayer sessions or passage reading. Furthermore, the Baptist church focuses a lot on making themselves family friendly, such as focusing greatly on their christenings. Finally, the Anglican church, officially Christ's church, focuses much more on Adults and the elderly moving into the village and giving them a place of worship. This is further reinforced by doing burial services in the only grave yard in the village in the land surrounding the church building itself, also owned by Christ's church.

Nearby, as well, are two more churches nearby in Hazlemere, an Anglican one, called the Holy Trinity Church and another Methodist church, run by the same organisation as the one in Holmer Green itself, known as the Hazlemere Free Methodist Church. Finally there is a nearby church in Widmer end known as the Church of the Good Sheppard, with no clear denomination.

Catholics, other denominations and other religions must travel into nearby High Wycombe, Chesham or Amersham, or elsewhere where other Churches, Mosques and other places of worship are present.

== Transport ==
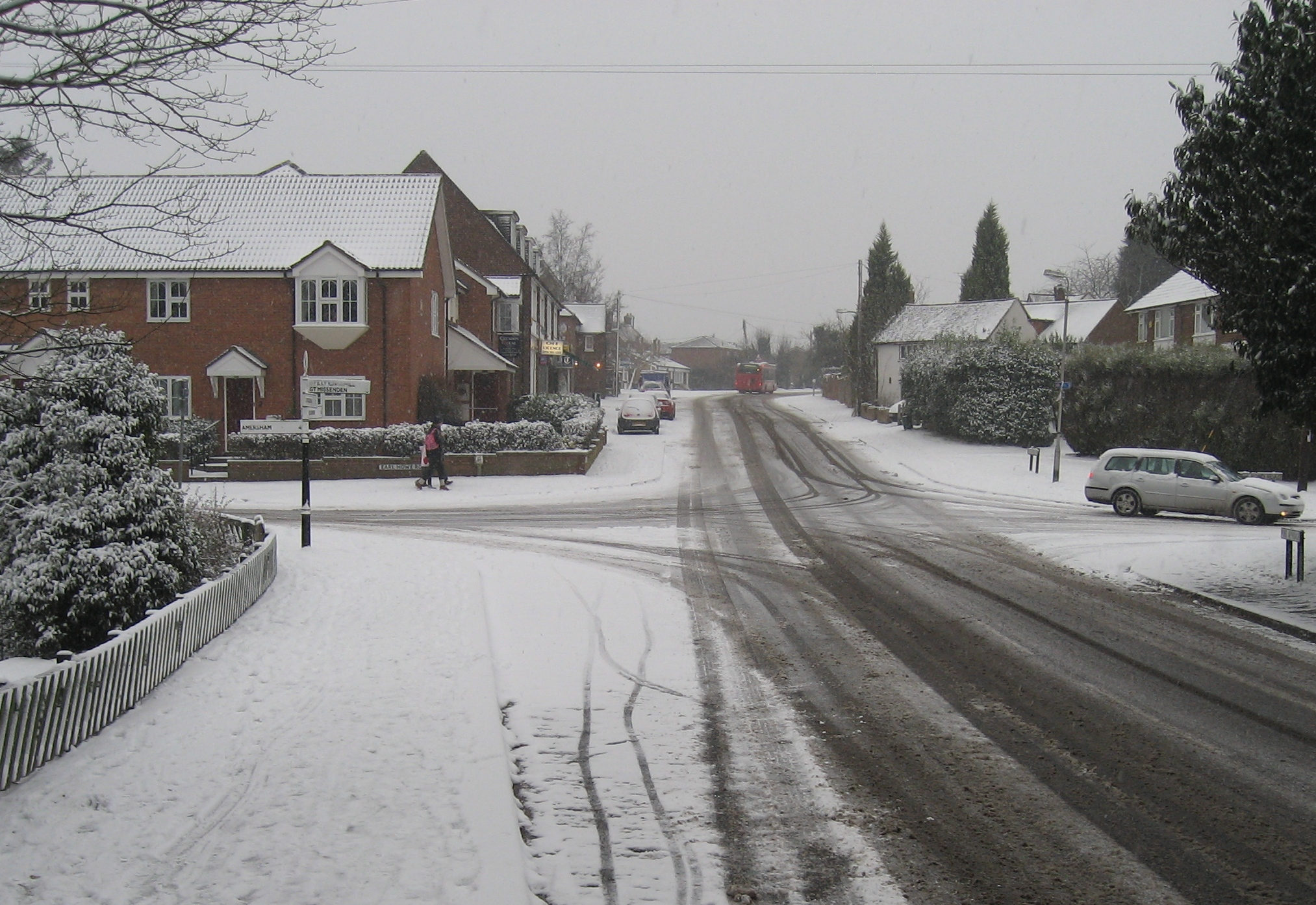
Holmer Green central crossroads in winter

Holmer Green is near the A404 road, which links junctions of the M4, M40 and M25 motorways.

Being only a short drive from both Amersham to the east, and High Wycombe to the south-west, the village is suitably located for commuting into London by main line trains on the Chiltern line which takes about 40 minutes, or on the Metropolitan line which is slower. Some of the working population commute to London every day. The proportion of London commuters is however lower than some surrounding villages – most villagers work in Buckinghamshire, Berkshire or Hertfordshire. The village is about 25 minutes' drive from London Heathrow Airport and an hour's drive from Gatwick, Luton, and Stansted airports.

Regular bus services operated by Carousel Buses and Arriva Shires & Essex connect Holmer Green to High Wycombe, Amersham and Chesham.

== Politics and Public Administration ==
Seven parish councillors represent Holmer Green on Little Missenden's thirteen-seat parish council which has offices at Rossetti Hall in Holmer Green. The councillors are formally independent of political parties. Holmer Green has long elected two Conservative district councillors to the Conservative-run Chiltern District Council. Holmer Green is also represented by Conservatives at County and Parliamentary levels.

Holmer Green has been part of Chesham and Amersham Parliamentary Constituency since its creation in 1974. Between 1950 and 1974, the village formed part of the larger South Buckinghamshire constituency, and prior to 1950, it was a part of the historic Aylesbury constituency. As such, the village was last represented by a non-Conservative in 1923, when the Liberal Thomas Keens was elected.

It is not however entirely accurate to say that Holmer Green has never been represented by a Labour MP. Until quite recently, the far south-west corner of Holmer Green around the appropriately-named Wycombe Road was actually a part of Hughenden parish, Wycombe District and therefore Wycombe constituency. This peculiarity had resulted from the village's steady growth towards Hazlemere and across an old Hundred and parish boundary. Between 1945 and 1951, Wycombe and therefore a handful of Holmer Green houses were represented by Labour MP John Edwin Haire.

The peculiarity was addressed and the village finally unified inside Little Missenden parish, Chiltern District and Chesham and Amersham constituency following the movement of the administrative boundary to the top of Sawpit Hill in 1987.

The 2011 proposals for parliamentary constituency boundary changes has kept Holmer Green in Chesham and Amersham constituency.

== Demography ==
Holmer Green compared
| | Holmer Green ward | Chiltern borough | England |
|---|---|---|---|
| Population | 4,077 | 89,228 | 49,138,831 |
| Foreign born | 4.4% | 9.3% | 9.2% |
| White | 97.8% | 95.5% | 90.9% |
| Asian | 1.1% | 2.8% | 4.6% |
| Black | 0.4% | 0.3% | 2.3% |
| Christian | 77.8% | 74.7% | 71.7% |
| Muslim | 0.6% | 1.9% | 3.1% |
| Hindu | 0.0% | 0.5% | 1.1% |
| No religion | 14.0% | 15.0% | 14.6% |
| Unemployed | 1.7% | 1.7% | 3.3% |
| Retired | 16.4% | 14.6% | 13.5% |

The 2001 Census recorded Holmer Green's electoral ward as having a population of 4,077. The ethnicity was 97.8% white, 0.5% mixed race, 1.1% Asian, 0.4% black and 0.2% other. The place of birth of residents was 95.6% United Kingdom, 0.5% Republic of Ireland, 0.9% other Western European countries, and 3% elsewhere. Religion was recorded as 77.8% Christian, 0.2% Buddhist, 0% Hindu, 0.2% Sikh, 0.3% Jewish, and 0.6% Muslim. 14% were recorded as having no religion, 0.1% had an alternative religion and 7% did not state their religion.

The economic activity of residents aged 16–74 was 39.9% in full-time employment, 14.1% in part-time employment, 12.5% self-employed, 1.7% unemployed, 2.5% students with jobs, 2.8% students without jobs, 16.4% retired, 7.3% looking after home or family, 1.7% permanently sick or disabled and 1.2% economically inactive for other reasons. The industry of employment of residents was 17% retail, 15.6% manufacturing, 7.9% construction, 19.5% real estate, 9.1% health and social work, 6.9% education, 5.6% transport and communications, 4.1% public administration, 2.6% hotels and restaurants, 3.8% finance, 1.1% agriculture and 6.8% other. Compared with national figures, the ward had a relatively high proportion of workers in real estate and construction. There were a relatively low proportion in public administration, hotels and restaurants. Of the ward's residents aged 16–74, 21.5% had a higher education qualification or the equivalent, compared with 19.9% nationwide.

== See also ==
- Beamond End
- Spurlands End

== Sources and further reading ==
- Page, W.H., ed. (1908). "Little Missenden". A History of the County of Buckingham, Volume 2. Victoria County History. Archibald Constable & Co. pp. 354–360.
- Riches, Paul; McLain Smith, Roland (2006). Once Upon a Heath: The Early History of Holmer Green. Dunstable: Annodata Print Services. ISBN 0955372100.
