= Lucy Day (disambiguation) =

Lucy Day may refer to:

- Lucy Day, in the UK soap opera Family Affairs, played by Julie Smith
- Saint Lucy's Day, also called Lucy Day
