= Adam Paul Harvey =

British actor

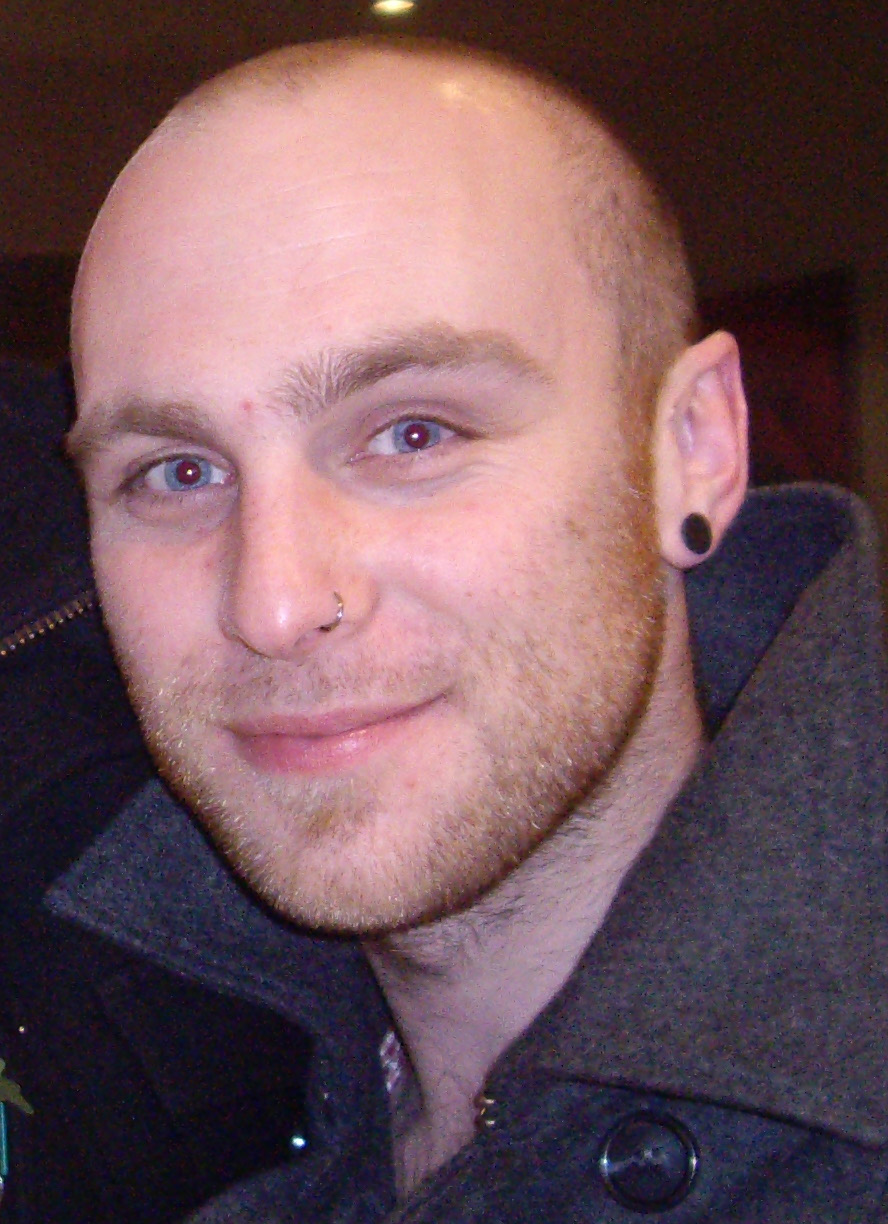
- Born: 7 July 1984 (age 42); High Wycombe, Buckinghamshire, England
- Occupation: Actor

Adam Paul Harvey (born 7 July 1984) is an English actor.

== Early life ==
Harvey was born in High Wycombe, Buckinghamshire, the son of Andrea (née Foster) and Gordon Harvey, an engineer. He attended Sir William Ramsay School in Hazlemere, High Wycombe and in 1998 enrolled at JPA School of Drama and Dance, after which he began auditioning.

== Career ==
His first professional role was in a commercial advertising the Nintendo 64. His first regular television role was in ITV1's short-lived soap opera Night and Day, in which he played Tom Brake. Other regular roles were Ralph Henshaw in Bedtime in 2002 (alongside Alun Armstrong), Russell in CITV's Girls in Love (2003–05) and Nathan Boothe in four series of ITV1's Where the Heart Is. He played the lead in BBC One's docudrama Dealing with Disasters (about London Nail Bomber David Copeland).

He has acted in a number of films, including My Brother Tom (2001), Son of Rambow (2007), the short 96 Ways to Say I Love You (2014) and Mad to Be Normal (formerly entitled Metanoia, 2017), a biopic of R. D. Laing, alongside a cast including David Tennant, Elisabeth Moss, Gabriel Byrne, David Bamber and Michael Gambon. He appeared in You, Me and Him, a comedy and This Weekend Will Change Your Life, a thriller, in 2018, and is due to appear in End of Term, a horror film, although as of September 2019, no release date has been announced.

In November 2013, he appeared in The Five(ish) Doctors Reboot, part of the 50th anniversary celebrations of Doctor Who. In November 2014, he had a role in Casualty. He has also appeared in two separate episodes of Doctors, playing different characters, firstly in November 2014 and, more recently, in September 2019.

== Filmography ==
Television
Year	Title	Role	Notes
2001-2003	Night and Day	Tom Brake	
2002	Bedtime	Ralph Henshaw	Series 2, episodes 2–6
2003	Strange	Matthew	Series 1, episode 2: "Kaa-Jinn"
2003	Star	Ralph	
2003	Mile High	Steve	
2003	Holby City	Scott Johnston	Series 6, episode 10: "Oedipus Wrecks"
2003–2005	Girls in Love	Russell	2 series
2003–2006	Where the Heart Is	Nathan Boothe	3 series
2006	The Bill	Andy Woodward	Series 22, episode 6
2007	Dealing with Disasters: The Brixton Nailbomber	David Copeland	
2013	The Five(ish) Doctors Reboot	Director (character)	
2014	Doctors	Duncan Medcalf	Series 16, episode 139: "One of Those Days"
2014	Casualty	Kieran Batten	Series 29, episode 12: "Losing Grip"
2019	Doctors	Mike Wells	Series 20, episode 165: "The Law of Unintended Consequences"

Film
Year	Title	Role	Notes
2001	My Brother Tom	Gang boy	
2007	Son of Rambow	Lawrence's Henchman	
2014	96 Ways to Say I Love You	Luke	
2017	Mad to Be Normal	Paul Zemmell	
2018	You, Me and Him	Nurse Paul	
2018	This Weekend Will Change Your Life	Jim	
TBA	End of Term	Biddleton	Awaiting release

Stage
Year	Title	Role	Venue
2011	Charlie Bangers	Dominic	The Lowry, Salford

Radio
Year	Title	Role	Notes
2003	The Rotters' Club	Doug	BBC Radio 4

Adverts
Year	Title	Role	Notes
2009	Integrity	Paparazzo	HSBC

== Personal life ==
He had a relationship with his Where the Heart Is co-star Georgia Tennant, who played his on-screen girlfriend, Alice Harding. They ended the relationship in 2006, but remain good friends.

He has a sister and three half-brothers, and is, as are they, first cousin, once removed of Peter Darvill-Evans as well as his younger brother, the composer Mark Darvill-Evans.

He is related on his father's side to Edward Stone, an eighteenth-century clergyman who discovered the active ingredient in Aspirin, as well as Irene Kathleen Stiles (1901–1964), who wrote romantic fiction under the pen name of Romilly Brent.
