= Sir William Ramsay School =

Location
- Rose Avenue; High Wycombe, Buckinghamshire, HP15 7UB; England; 51°38′50″N 0°42′43″W

Information
- Type: Academy
- Religious affiliation: Multicultural
- Established: 1976
- Specialist: Arts College
- Department for Education URN: 137256 Tables
- Ofsted: Reports
- Headteacher: Neil Stocking
- Gender: Coeducational
- Age: 11 to 18
- Enrolment: 1180
- Website: www.swr.school

Sir William Ramsay School is a co-educational secondary school in Hazlemere, Buckinghamshire, England. It takes children from the age of 11 through to the age of 18 with a total of approximately 1,180 pupils attending. The school shares a catchment area with the nearby Holmer Green Senior School.

== History ==
The school was founded in 1976, and named after Nobel Prize winning scientist Sir William Ramsay, who lived in Hazlemere until his death in 1916. Sir William Ramsay has three houses: Blake, Nash and Hepworth. Each form is an individual house.

It was awarded specialist school status as a Visual Arts College by the Department for Education and Skills in September 2000.

On 9 January 2004, a fifteen-year-old pupil stabbed a fellow pupil after she intervened when he threatened his ex-girlfriend with a seven-inch steak knife.

On the morning of 27 January 2007, two men entered the school and were regarded as suspicious. Pupils were held in classrooms and the school was placed on lockdown while a police helicopter and canine team searched the surrounding area. Two men were later arrested.

In August 2011 the school became an Academy.

== Facilities ==
In 2007, the school opened a new performing arts centre. The first performance was the musical Grease.

In 2017 a new complex housing science labs, maths rooms, and a sixth form centre was opened by alumna and British singer Leigh-Anne Pinnock.

== Head teachers ==
Until the beginning of the 2012–13 academic year, the head teacher was Gaynor Comber. She was succeeded by Mark Mayne, who was in the role until the 2016–17 academic year. Deputy headteacher Chris Carter became acting head until the appointment of Christine McLintock for the 2017–18 academic year. McClintock resigned her role of Executive Headteacher after five years, and was succeeded by Paul Ramsey.

== Ofsted ==
In June 2022, Sir William Ramsay School underwent a full Ofsted inspection, where it was rated 'Inadequate', following a monitoring visit in 2021. The report described the arrangements for safeguarding as "not effective" and indicated that the school has "high incidence of serious behaviour incidents". In addition, the curriculum was described as "not always delivered well" in some subjects. According to the inspection report, the school has a good Sixth Form provision with high quality facilities for students to use.

Ofsted completed a further monitoring inspection of Sir William Ramsay School in March 2023. The report found that the school "remains inadequate and has serious weaknesses" despite a "strengthened" safeguarding team and improvements to behaviour.

== Disabled, special needs and hearing impaired pupils ==
The school has a unit for deaf pupils, known as the HARP, and a unit for disabled and special needs pupils known as the SEN.

== Notable alumni ==
- Abigail Hardingham (born 1991), actress.
- Adam Paul Harvey (born 1984), actor who played Tom Brake in Night and Day, Ralph Henshaw in Bedtime and Nathan Boothe in Where the Heart Is. More recently he has acted in two films: My Brother Tom (2001) and Son of Rambow (2007).
- Leigh-Anne Pinnock (born 1991), former Head Girl and British singer.
