= Girls Under Pressure =

1998 novel by Jacqueline Wilson

Girls under Pressure
- First edition
- Author: Jacqueline Wilson
- Illustrator: Nick Sharratt
- Language: English
- Genre: Children's novel
- Publisher: Doubleday
- Publication date: 1998
- Publication place: United Kingdom
- Media type: Print (Paperback)
- Preceded by: Girls in Love
- Followed by: Girls out Late

Girls under Pressure is the second book in the Girls series, written by Dame Jacqueline Wilson, a noted English author who writes fiction for children. It was published in 1998, the sequel to Girls in Love and followed by Girls out Late and Girls in Tears. It is aimed at pre-teen and teenage readers.

The book follows the story of a 13-year-old girl named Ellie who is struggling with issues of body image, peer pressure, and self-esteem. Like the rest of the series, Girls under Pressure is told from the viewpoint of Eleanor "Ellie" Allard, a plump thirteen-year-old girl who lives with her father, her stepmother, Anna, and her little half-brother, Eggs.

== Plot ==
Ellie and her two best friends, Magda and Nadine, are Christmas shopping at the Flowerfields Shopping Centre. While they shop, they notice a large buzz of an event going on upstairs. Nadine wonders if it is for television. Magda replies, "Wow, I hope so" and steers the other two upstairs, where they join a queue to discover what all the fuss is about.

It turns out to be a modelling competition for Spicy magazine, which Ellie discovers after seeing a lot of pretty teenage girls getting their photos taken. Ellie stares in horror as she realises what she has been in the queue for. She witnesses Magda and Nadine being photographed, seeing how pretty Nadine is. It is Ellie's turn to be photographed, but she runs away, pushing through the queue as she goes, resulting in one of the girls in the queue exclaiming “She's far too fat for modelling”. Ellie, hurt and upset, leaves and goes home. She begins to display signs of disordered eating from this point, both by restricting her food intake and making herself sick when she feels she has overeaten.

It worsens when Nadine gets through to the second round of the Spicy modelling competition. Ellie tries to be supportive but envies all of the models and their bodies and reflects how unfair it is that Nadine is so slim despite taking no care over her diet. However, Nadine is not chosen to go through to the next round. The two quarrel, but make it up on the way home. Meanwhile, Magda has been on a date with an older boy called Mick who assumed she was "easy" because of her bleached blonde hair and put her under pressure to have sex outside after their date. All three girls are disheartened as a result.

Ellie is still in the throes of disordered eating and has started to worry her parents due to her weight loss and their discovery of her eating behaviours. She had previously done an art project with Zoë, an intelligent student who has been put up a year to take her GCSEs early, and had more recently encountered Zoë at the swimming pool. Ellie notices that Zoë used to have a "biggest bum" and now she has "amazing cheekbones", due to her lack of food and plentiful exercise. She uses Zoë as inspiration for a time, but one day Zoë is not at the swimming pool or at school. She learns that Zoë has been taken to an eating disorders ward at the local hospital and visits her there. The visit prompts Ellie to examine her behaviours after realising that Zoë got so thin she collapsed and nearly died of heart failure, and she is shocked by how sad and small Zoë looks. Ellie decides that, ultimately, she is not willing to risk everything in the pursuit of being thin and is going to concentrate on being happy and vigoruos instead. She understands that her frame is not skinny but strong, and that it is part of her identity.

== Reviews ==
"Girls Under Pressure" has mixed reviews and has been praised for its honest and compassionate portrayal of the body image topic. The BookMice states "It has a lot of the normal type of things such as how women are pressured into trying to conform to a particular standard of body structure and how this can result in anorexia..." A review from BookTrust found it was "A thought-provoking and important book that addresses a topic that many young girls are faced with. Wilson's writing is engaging and accessible, making this a great choice for readers of all levels." Motherbookerblog noted that "This is a book that realistically portrays some of the aspects of teenage life as I remember them. Whilst some of the novel seems outdated, there is still plenty to be gained from this book.."
