= Night and Day (TV series) =

British soap opera

- The series original title card, depicting Georgina Walker as Jane Harper
- Genre: Soap opera Mystery
- Created by: Caleb Ranson
- Starring: Katy Walker; Nick Schofield; Sally Dexter; Tim Wallers; Stephanie Leonidas; Lysette Anthony; Joe McGann; Kevin Sacre; Dominic Rickhards; Glynis Barber; Lesley Joseph; Stuart Manning; Daniella Isaacs; Gareth Hunt; Joe Jacobs; Christianne Gadd; Cathy Tyson; Adam Paul Harvey; Seb Castang; Debbie Korley; Sean Francis; Phoebe Thomas; Julia Lee Smith
- Opening theme: "Always & Forever" — Kylie Minogue
- Composer: David Arch
- Country of origin: United Kingdom
- Original language: English
- No. of series: 3
- No. of episodes: 320 (240 x 20min, 80 x 60min)

Production
- Executive producers: Peter Cregeen; Michele Buck; Damien Timmer
- Producer: Chris Le Grys
- Cinematography: Clive Gill; David Ortkiese; Chris Roach
- Editor: Ian Seymour
- Running time: 20—60 minutes
- Production companies: LWT; Granada Television

Original release
- Network: ITV
- Release: 6 November 2001 – 5 June 2003

Night and Day is a British mystery soap opera, produced by Granada Television for LWT, that first broadcast on 6 November 2001 on ITV, and ran until 5 June 2003. The series was launched as part of ITV's new early evening line-up, with an enormous amount of pre-publicity and trailers promoting the series. The series was written and created by screenwriter Caleb Ranson, with other contributors to the series including John Jackson, Jessica Townsend, Cris Cole, Elizabeth Delaney, Jeff Dodds, Robert Fraser, Adrian Hewitt, Martha Jay, Charles Lambert, Ed McCardie, Adrian Pagan, Bradley Quirk, Tony Ramsay and Catherine Stedman. The series opening theme, "Always & Forever", was performed by Kylie Minogue.

At first, the series rated well, even drawing comparisons to series such as Twin Peaks. However, as the series storylines became more bizarre and complex, it began to rate poorly, only gaining a small, cult fanbase, and was pushed to a later timeslot due to the lack of mainstream interest. Subsequently, little more than six months after the series premiered, filming wrapped on 17 May 2002, and the series was later axed by station executives, who cited low ratings as the principal reason. The final episode aired on screen on 5 June 2003.

== Synopsis ==
The series begins on the sixteenth birthday of best friends Jane Harper and Della Wells, who live in the same street in Greenwich. However, before the day is over, Jane has disappeared. Over the next year, the lives of six families in the street become further intertwined as a tangled web of secrets and lies threaten to boil to the surface, and Jane's disappearance continues to have a devastating effect. The series combined typical soap opera plots, including babies switched at birth and clandestine affairs, with more unusual stories including murders at the catacombs, and an episode in which a mysterious stranger came to the street and stopped time to uncover the truth about the residents, only to eventually erase their memories of events of that alternative reality and turn everything back to normal.

Despite the series being axed, the decision was made long before the final episode was set to air allowing the producers to script an ending to the series. As the series comes to a close, Sam – wandering away from home – finds Jane working as a geisha, with no memory of who she was. He returned her to her family, and her return – coming on the heels of the year anniversary of her disappearance – only served to increase tensions and bring secrets into the open. The final episode, the eightieth when counting only the hour-long episodes, focused on revealing some of the secrets behind the characters and Jane being arrested for murder. The episode then flashed forward to four years later and looked at one day in the very different lives of the residents of Greenwich, as Jane was seemingly released from prison and came to discover what had happened since. However, Natalie later learns that Jane was not released, and had in fact died in her cell that morning, and that the presence was in fact her ghost. The final episode closed with a montage of moments from the series to Björk's "All is Full of Love".

== Broadcast ==
The series premiered with an unusual format: three thirty-minute episodes would air each week in a teatime slot, before being merged into one, single hour-long late-night "omnibus" episode, which aired on Thursdays, often containing additional explicit scenes (such as discussion or events that could not be aired in an earlier timeslot). The first thirty-minute episode attracted 2.2 million viewers, airing at 17:05 on 6 November 2001. Across the next few months, the series averaged 1.4 million viewers in this timeslot. However, on 27 March 2002, ITV announced it was removing the series from the teatime slot the following week. This was in response to the series' viewing figures rapidly declining, attracting only a 9% audience share and being beaten in the ratings by BBC Two's The Weakest Link and Channel 4's Richard & Judy.

The series' removal was so sudden that TV listings for the next week still advertised it. Speaking of the decision to axe the teatime episodes, Tony Woods, then head of continuing drama at ITV, stated that "The series has already established itself as cult viewing for young adults, and re-positioning it with a debut broadcast in the evening will build on its appeal". The series continued to air the hour long episodes in a later time slot, with some episodes airing as late as 2AM. Most episodes also aired later than billed, some almost ten minutes behind the advertised schedule. The vacant teatime slot was filled by repeats of game shows such as Catchphrase, You've Been Framed and Family Fortunes. Eventually, in January 2003, a relaunched version of Crossroads aired in the slot, before it too was also cancelled after only a few months on air. The final hour long 'omnibus' episode aired on 5 June 2003 and attracted 500,000 viewers, despite airing at 00:30.

In Australia, the series screened on ABC TV. It originally aired at 6pm on weeknights, as a lead into the evening news, but the later episodes were predominantly screened very late at night, in a similar fashion to the UK broadcast; although these retained the thirty-minute format.

== Production ==
With the loss of Home and Away to Channel 5 in early 2000, the ITV network centre decided to tender bids from various UK production companies for a new British soap to replace it. United Productions pitched an idea with the working title of "Life, Etc" that was to be 'about a group of friends "watching their children grow up before they have finished growing up themselves"'. Further in to development, the working title of the series change to "Trafalgar Road", which was later abandoned due to an existing street having that name in the filming location of Greenwich.

The series was first unveiled by ITV executives on 27 April 2001, before the leading cast were announced on 9 May. The series eventually premiered in November 2001 after production delays halted filming and meant that the original premiere date was pushed back.

'Thornton Street' was in reality King George Street SE10, one of the most historic areas of Greenwich. Other locations in Greenwich included the Cutty Sark pub, the Old Greenwich Hospital and Greenwich Park. 'St Vincents Halfway House' was actually in the London Borough of Tower Hamlets. Interior shots were filmed at the Three Mills Studios in Bow.

Night and Day was nominated for ten awards at the British Soap Awards 2002, beating established rivals such as Hollyoaks and Emmerdale. It won one award, 'Hero of the year' (chosen by a panel of judges) for the character of Sam giving up football to look after his orphaned siblings. Filming had finished the day before the British Soap Awards.

Some five weeks before the final episode aired in 2003, many TV guides flagged up the week’s episode as the 'last in series'. Indeed, the Radio Times even printed a double page feature about the shows demise after 17 months on air. Quite why this error could have happened is unknown. This led to some fans thinking the series had ended on a knife-edge cliffhanger when in fact the next five weeks tied up all the loose ends to all plots.

In 2006, the Radio Times ran a small article about the fifth anniversary of Night and Day's premiere. The programme was described as being stylish but with little substance.

The series was never released on video or DVD. The sheer number of songs used on the soundtrack throughout the series would make a DVD release financially impractical as each artist would need to be paid a royalty fee. At the time of the shows final transmission rumours circulated on fan message boards of a clause in the production contract that prevents a rerun of the series until five years after its initial transmission. This has not been confirmed by ITV or LWT. As of 6 September 2026, more than twenty years since the final episode, the series has never been repeated on broadcast television or streaming services in the United Kingdom.

== BFI Mediatheque archive ==
Night and Day is partially available to view at the BFI Mediatheque, South Bank, London. 145 episode records are listed in the database, the majority of which are viewable at the Mediatheque.

== Cast ==
=== Main cast ===
- Georgina Walker as Jane Harper; beautiful, mysterious, bitchy and intimidating, Jane was the golden girl of the neighbourhood, the girl who had everything...or at least that is how it seemed.
- Nick Schofield as Ryan Harper; Jane's older brother is handsome, but insecure. A master manipulator, Ryan has learnt how to use people to his own will, and soon begins retreating back into this as he deals with being part of a broken home.
- Sally Dexter as Dr. Natalie Harper; Birth name: Natalie Brake. Jane's mother, a G.P. Despite being very highly-strung and quite secure, Natalie's initial ability to deal with her daughter's disappearance masks her true crumbling nature.
- Tim Wallers as Duncan Harper; Jane's father, subordinate to Natalie. Unlike Natalie and her friends, Duncan did not grow up in the area and feels increasingly alone as past events come back to haunt others, while he cannot understand what is going on.
- Stephanie Leonidas as Della Wells; Jane's best friend, shares her birthday. Della is blossoming into her own woman, but has always lived in the shadow of Jane, and always wanted to better understand her best friend. She has fallen in love with mysterious Josh Alexander who seems just as smitten with her, but her overprotective dad Alex is an obstacle in the way of true love.
- Lysette Anthony as Roxanne Doyle; Natalie's best friend, and Della's mother. Pregnant and prone to irrational outbursts.
- Joe McGann as Alex Wells; Roxanne's partner, he is the father of all her children but her oldest, Dennis. He has a shady past, including the fact that – in the year leading up to her disappearance – he was secretly dating Jane, his daughter's best friend. Overprotective of daughter Della and has many shady secrets he would rather keep to himself.
- Kevin Sacre as Dennis Doyle; Roxanne's eldest son. Has never fully trusted his stepdad, Alex, and is now discovering adulthood. A loser in love after being rejected by bitchy Jane Harper and catty Kate Ellis.
- Dominic Rickhards as Mike Brake; Natalie's younger brother. As a schoolboy, he fell for his teacher Fiona and – when she fell pregnant – the two got married. This early marriage has masked his true feelings of homosexuality, which are only now coming out.
- Glynis Barber as Fiona Brake; Mike's wife. Close to the children of the street given her nature as their schoolteacher.
- Lesley Joseph as Rachel Culgrin; the street's resident bitch, and a schoolteacher. She makes her feelings known on every subject, particularly the lifestyle of her nephew Sam, and her colleague Fiona.
- Stuart Manning as Sam Armstrong; an up-and-coming soccer player. Sam was Jane's first boyfriend, and the father of her unborn baby, although he wasn't aware of it at the time. Even though they never went all the way, she got pregnant when they were making out and he came too soon. Sam's life, however, changed when his parents were killed and he took in his sister Lucy, brother Ben, and had to deal with the sudden involvement in his life of his Aunt Rachel. Sam also consented to let Dennis move in with him.
- Daniella Isaacs as Lucy Armstrong; Sam's much younger sister. Her world is the most affected by the death of her parents, and she is struggling to understand the power struggle between Rachel and Sam.
- Gareth Hunt as Charlie Doyle; Roxanne's father, he runs the local pub and is probably the wisest of the neighbourhood. Charlie has been married several times.
- Joe Jacobs as Jimmy Hamilton Doyle; Charlie's son by a previous marriage, Jimmy is the same age as Jane and her friends and is a wild child.
- Christianne Gadd as Donna Doyle; Charlie's current wife, Brazilian.
- Cathy Tyson as Reverend Stephanie MacKenzie; the new reverend, who moves in to take over the "Halfway House" for less advantaged teens. She has a past with Natalie, Alex and Roxanne.
- Adam Paul Harvey as Tom Brake; Fiona and Mike's son, he has never been successful with girls – even though his best (female) friend is in love with him. He also is interested in film, constantly filming events that occur.
- Seb Castang as Josh Alexander; a resident of the Halfway House, Josh was seeing Jane, but after her disappearance he develops feelings for Della. Josh is gorgeous, broody and intense. He is rocked by strange visions and tortured by the thought that he might have killed Jane during one of his blackouts. He has slowly fallen in love with Della Wells but pushes her away as he is scared of hurting her.
- Debbie Korley as Frankie Radcliffe; Tom's best friend. She has always had a weird attitude to sex, and her feeling that sex is a disgusting will complicate her relationship with Tom.
- Sean Francis as Will Radcliffe; Frankie's father, business partner and best friend to Mike. He is a single dad, and is just starting to get back out on the dating scene – but also trying to juggle it with his life as a parent.
- Phoebe Thomas as Holly Curran; one of the most enigmatic residents, Holly lives at the Halfway House and is close with Josh. She regularly speaks her mind in regard to people she does not like. She knows about Jane and Alex's relationship.
- Julia Lee Smith as Kate Ellis; she is the only person who can match Ryan in a battle of manipulation, but her talent at this also masks her insecurity. A model, she uses her looks to get what she wants and can wrap men around her little finger without any hassle.

=== Recurring cast ===
- Jai Wilson as Becky Wells; daughter of Alex and Roxanne.
- Keya Wilson as Laura Wells; daughter of Alex and Roxanne.
- Bradley Walsh as Eddie 'Woody' Dexter; Danny's brother and Dennis's uncle. Woody had feelings for Natalie and returns just in time to find her marriage on the rocks.
- Phoebe Sweeney as Celeste Dexter; Woody's daughter, who becomes Ryan's girlfriend.
- Laurie Hagen as Francois Jardin; Jane's penpal from France who arrives in the aftermath, unaware of the tragedy that befell her, and whose letters may hold clues.
- Julie Legrand as Melanie Bradshaw; a weird nurse whose delivered Jane and Della and is supposed to deliver Roxanne's new baby. Roxanne is terrified of her and suspects that she might be the source of anonymous letters which warn Roxanne her baby is not safe.
- Dan D'Souza as Django Doyle; Charlie's son, a singer in Singapore who comes to stay unexpectedly and begins to manipulate his father.
- Paul Kynman as 'Malcolm Burns'; the caretaker of the halfway house and grounds, who disappears some time after Jane. His death is first pronounced a suicide, but it seems more likely that he was murdered.
- Jenna Boyd as Lydia; an unattractive parking inspector whom Sam starts to date out of feelings of guilt because of Jane.
- Max Anthony Foster as Ben Armstrong; Sam and Lucy's baby brother.
- Coralie Rose as Aunt Begonia; Donna's attractive sister, who falls for Jimmy, her nephew-by-marriage.
- Clarke Peters as Gabriel Huysman; a mysterious stranger who claims to be a private investigator and who questions the people around Jane.
- Shane Richie as Danny Dexter; Dennis's father, who may have been involved in Jane's disappearance.
- Flip Webster as Inspector Paisley; the officer who takes over Jane's case.

== Episodes ==
=== Series 1 (2001—2002) ===
| No. | Title | Directed by | Written by | Original release date |
|---|---|---|---|---|
| 1—3 (1) | "Dark Secrets" | David Moore | Caleb Ranson | 8 November 2001 |
As the joint 16th birthday of best friends Jane Harper and Della Wells dawns, parents Natalie and Roxy are preparing for a spectacular party. Jane, however, has been having an affair with Della's father, Alex, and has also been receiving threatening text messages. When some disturbing objects designed to represent her are left on her doorstep, she decides to investigate. Visiting runaway teen Josh Alexander, whom she has also been romancing, at the Half Way House, she discovers that he has a secret mobile phone, leading her to suspect he is the source of the messages. But shortly after their meeting, Jane flees into the night and ends up in the local graveyard, from which she later disappears.
| 4—6 (2) | TBA | Bill Eagles | Alison Carr | 15 November 2001 |
The Thornton Street residents start to take Jane's disappearance seriously, as the search for her gets underway. Roxy discovers she is pregnant. Sam is still undecided over the offer from Aunt Rachel. Della decides to become friends with Frankie. Duncan returns from a trip to find out some terrible news.
| 7—9 (3) | TBA | Charles Palmer | Alison Carr | 22 November 2001 |
The police visit Natalie to interview her about Jane, but it seems the daughter Natalie knew and the real Jane are far from the same person. When the police later discover a body, Natalie is faced with the possibility that her daughter may be dead. After realising that she never really knew Jane at all, Della decides that the police should know about Josh, so she tells her parents about their secret relationship. Meanwhile, after suffering from nightmares, Alex is forced to reveal the shame of his previous affair, and Rachel tests Sam.
| 10—12 (4) | TBA | Dominic Lees | Elizabeth Delaney | 29 November 2001 |
As the police start to dig into Jane's past, Alex panics when he realises they are close to finding out about their affair. Natalie seeks out Josh after he released from questioning. Natalie realises that she didn't know Jane quite as much as she believed, and sets out on a mission to find out about her secret life. Alex also decides to pay Josh a visit. Frankie finds out a shocking secret about her father and Roxanne. Natalie believes that Fiona is having an affair, but her suspicions are proved wrong.
| 13—15 (5) | TBA | Tim Mercier | Jessica Towshend | 6 December 2001 |
Natalie and Duncan discover they can't pay the ransom. But one question remains unanswered, why did Roxanne borrow money from Natalie? Mike and Will both quit their jobs and decide to go into business together.
| 16—18 (6) | TBA | Unknown | Unknown | 13 December 2001 |
| 19—21 (7) | TBA | Unknown | Unknown | 20 December 2001 |
| 22—24 (8) | "Last Christmas" | Unknown | Unknown | 27 December 2001 |
As Christmas approaches, Natalie reminisces about Christmases past, including Sam's parents before the crash, Jane and Alex as they are about to embark on their affair, the breakdown of Will's marriage and Jane getting an abortion.
| 25—27 (9) | TBA | Unknown | Unknown | 3 January 2002 |
Alex struggles to cope without Roxanne. Rachel embarks on a mission to destroy her colleague, Fiona Brake. Dennis brings home the wrong baby. The police find Jane's keyring, holding a key which no one recognises, except Alex, who worries that the police are about to find his and Jane's love nest. Tom has a big secret which comes to air when he and Jimmy run down Thornton Street naked.
| 28—30 (10) | TBA | Unknown | Unknown | 10 January 2002 |
| 31—33 (11) | TBA | Unknown | Unknown | 17 January 2002 |
| 34—36 (12) | TBA | Unknown | Unknown | 24 January 2002 |
Natalie can't decide whether or not to inform the police about Jane's abortion. Francoise's behaviour causes much trouble. News of Jane's abortion reaches Alex. But if he wasn't the father then who was? Josh? Natalie is desperate for sympathy and turns to Alex. But Roxanne becomes jealous. But what neither of them know is Alex knows far more than he is letting on. As the search for letters from Jane to Francoise begins, Natalie believes they may hold vital clues.
| 37—39 (13) | TBA | Unknown | Unknown | 31 January 2002 |
A face from the past, Steph McKenzie, returns to Thornton Street, to take up the role of the local vicar, but Natalie, who is far from happy, makes her hatred of Steph very clear. Roxanne begins to worry that Alex will return while Steph is still around. Meanwhile, Sam shares a kiss with Kate, but little does he know it is the start of something very sinister.
| 40—42 (14) | TBA | Unknown | Unknown | 7 February 2002 |
Natalie tries to turn public opinion against Steph, recruiting Rachel in her crusade. After making a visit to Steph, Duncan decides to tell Natalie about Jane's abortion, but is left stunned when Natalie reveals that she already knew.
| 43—45 (15) | TBA | Unknown | Unknown | 14 February 2002 |
Roxanne and Della try to stop Alex from straying. Kate fails to attract the attention of Ryan. Roxanne becomes desperate and tells Alex about Steph's dark secret. Duncan and Alex talk about Steph's return, while Natalie convinces herself that she is a bad mother.
| 46—48 (16) | TBA | Unknown | Unknown | 21 February 2002 |
After being asked to move into Sam's place, Rachel decides to employ Kate, to lead Sam astray, but as Sam tries to come to terms with his childhood, Kate fails to win him over. Roxanne is forced to admit she lied about Steph. Meanwhile, the police link Malcolm's disappearance to Jane's.
| 49—51 (17) | "Reconstructions" | Unknown | Unknown | 28 February 2002 |
Della is asked to play Jane in a police reconstruction. Steph holds a community service for Jane. Mike acts strangely when Steph's friend, Jeremy, reveals he is gay, forcing Jeremy to pay him a visit.
| 52—54 (18) | TBA | Unknown | Unknown | 7 March 2002 |
After both having visions of Jane, Alex and Josh revisit events, and Josh admits that lied to the police about his movements on the night Jane went missing.
| 55—57 (19) | TBA | Unknown | Unknown | 14 March 2002 |
As Alex starts to receive threatening text messages, he begins to worry that someone has found out about his affair with Jane. Later, his stalker orders him to meet at the Darc Bar. Meanwhile, Tom has a make over.
| 58—60 (20) | TBA | Unknown | Unknown | 21 March 2002 |
Dennis thinks that Alex's former lover is his stalker. Meanwhile, after suspecting that he may be gay, Fiona finds Tom in bed with Jimmy, and Mike having a romantic tryst with Francoise. As the rumours surrounding Tom's sexuality begin to circulate around Thornton Street, he attempts to prove a point by kissing Frankie.
| 61—63 (21) | TBA | Unknown | Unknown | 28 March 2002 |
Della finds out, from Holly, that Josh killed his father. Meanwhile, as Sam plans Ben's future, Kate plans his downfall. As events take a surprising turn, Kate and Sam share a passionate kiss.
| 64—66 (22) | TBA | Unknown | Unknown | 4 April 2002 |
As Natalie continues to sleep in Jane's room, Della finds out about Jane's abortion. As the cracks in her family unit begin to grow, Della decides to move in with Natalie. Meanwhile, Holly continues to stalk Alex.

=== Series 2 (2002) ===
| No. | Title | Directed by | Written by | Original release date |
|---|---|---|---|---|
| 67—69 (23) | "Time Stands Still" | Unknown | Unknown | 11 April 2002 |
A strange and mysterious figure, Gabriel, arrives in Thorton Street. His presence causes time to stop, but who is he? He quizzes the residents about Jane's disappearance and their own scandalous private lives. Alex is accused of killing Malcolm. Roxanne finally finds out about Alex's affair with Jane, and Mike attacks Gabriel, thinking he wants Fiona. Alex and Mike then turn their attention towards Josh. They start a lynch mob, convinced he killed Jane, but Natalie stops them. An angry and mad Roxanne stabs Alex to death. Gabriel decides to tell Natalie what happened to Jane the night she disappeared, where she is and what has happened to her. But Natalie stops him, could she already know? Gabriel disappears and time starts again. No one can remember what has happened. Alex and Roxanne are in love but are weary of each other, but don't know why. Natalie and Josh are in the graveyard and notice a grave with the word "Gabriel" on it. The name seems vaguely familiar to them both but they don't know why. The reconstruction is cancelled, and Jane is still missing.
| 70—72 (24) | TBA | Unknown | Unknown | 18 April 2002 |
Holly steps up her games with Alex.
| 73—75 (25) | TBA | Unknown | Unknown | 25 April 2002 |
Rachel delights in her scheming over Sam.
| 76—78 (26) | TBA | Unknown | Unknown | 2 May 2002 |
| 79—81 (27) | TBA | Unknown | Unknown | 9 May 2002 |
Roxanne is desperate to persuade people that Alex is Della's father.
| 82—84 (28) | TBA | Unknown | Unknown | 16 May 2002 |
| 85—87 (29) | TBA | Unknown | Unknown | 23 May 2002 |
Mike visits his therapists and admits he thinks he is gay. New evidence comes to light over Jane's disappearance.
| 88—90 (30) | "Truth of the Affair" | Unknown | Unknown | 30 May 2002 |
Roxanne finally tells Natalie about Duncan's affair.
| 91—93 (31) | TBA | Unknown | Unknown | 6 June 2002 |
Alex asks Roxanne to marry him. Rachel tells Dennis he has to retake his exams before leaving school. Tom takes a shine to Holly.
| 94—96 (32) | "Desperate Measures" | Unknown | Unknown | 13 June 2002 |
Rachel is determined to get custody of Lucy and Ben, but places Ben's life in danger. Josh believes he was involved in Malcolm's disappearance.
| 97—99 (33) | TBA | Emma Bodger | Carolyn Bonnyman | 20 June 2002 |
Donna announces she is pregnant. Roxanne doesn't believe Alex wants to marry her.
| 100—102 (34) | TBA | Brian Farnham | John Jackson | 27 June 2002 |
Josh remembers seeing Jane and Steph together on the night she disappeared.
| 103—105 (35) | "Head to Head" | Roger Goldby | Cris Cole | 4 July 2002 |
Fiona and Rachel compete for the job of deputy head.
| 106—108 (36) | "Means to an End" | Bill Britten | Helen Griffith | 11 July 2002 |
Roxanne puts an end to Dennis' relationship with Holly, but her actions lead Alex to believe Holly will reveal everything about his affair with Jane.
| 109—111 (37) | "Crush" | Tania Diez | Ryan Craig | 18 July 2002 |
Mike admits that he wants another baby, while Della admits that she fancies her teacher.
| 112—114 (38) | "Haunted" | Brian Farnham | Ryan Craig | 25 July 2002 |
Roxanne is nervous about her approaching wedding with Alex, while Josh investigates the possibility that the halfway house might be haunted.
| 115—117 (39) | "Django Arrives" | Tania Diez | Adrian Pagan | 1 August 2002 |
Charlie tries to get in touch with his son, Django. Natalie admits to Duncan that she wants to move away from Thornton Street.
| 118—120 (40) | "As Good as it Gets" | Jamie Payne | John Jackson | 8 August 2002 |
| 121—123 (41) | "Decision Time" | Jamie Payne | Adrian Pagan | 15 August 2002 |
| 124—126 (42) | "Old Flame" | Tim Mercier | John Jackson | 22 August 2002 |
Natalie bumps into an old flame, Woody. Rachel holds a party, but it ends in disaster.
| 127—129 (43) | "Too Close for Comfort" | Unknown | Unknown | 29 August 2002 |
Della thinks that Josh and Kate are seeing each other. Della later finds out that Josh fancies her. As Josh and Della go to kiss, Josh collapses. Ryan and Kate, both watching, step in to help Josh.
| 130—132 (44) | "Fascination" | Charles Palmer | John Corwin | 5 September 2002 |
Mike becomes fascinated with Django.
| 133—135 (45) | "Alternative Days" | Charles Palmer | Adrian Pagan | 12 September 2002 |
A lonely, desperate and drunk Natalie sets on her mind on considering how life might have been if Jane was still around. In her alternative reality, Jane is pregnant and is marrying Sam because he believes it's his baby. Or is it? As the wedding day approaches, Natalie seems pleased that her daughter is marrying. but will the ceremony go ahead? And is everything as perfect as it seems?
| 136—138 (46) | TBA | N.G. Bristow | Helen Griffin | 19 September 2002 |
Josh continues to suffer from Blackouts.
| 139—141 (47) | "Stalker" | David Winn | Elizabeth Delaney | 26 September 2002 |
Woody struggles to tell Dennis about his father. Alex suspects he is being followed.
| 142—144 (48) | "Nurse Bradshaw" | Steve Kelly | Lynne Harwood | 3 October 2002 |
Roxanne is frightened by the new mid-wife who she has been assigned: a face from the past, who helped delivered Jane and Della. Meanwhile, Kate and Tom's birthdays don't go exactly to plan.
| 145—147 (49) | "Cold Calling" | Joy Perino | Charles Lambert | 10 October 2002 |
Della receives a number of spooky phone calls.
| 148—150 (50) | TBA | Steve Kelly | Rob Fraser | 17 October 2002 |
Fiona suspects she may be going blind.
| 151—153 (51) | TBA | Roger Goldby | Matt Parker | 24 October 2002 |
When Roxanne falls down the stairs, she decides to show Della some threatening letters she has been receiving. At first, Della is doubtful about her mother's state of mind, but she soon finds herself following a mysterious figure down the corridor of the hospital.
| 154—156 (52) | "Django's Hollywood Bound" | Bom Tomson | Cris Cole | 1 November 2002 |
Django claims to have been offered a job writing songs in Hollywood. When Charlie admits to Donna that he is secretly scared of Django, she confesses that Django tried to seduce her. Fiona is distracted. She mistakenly thinks Kate is having a fling with Will and confronts him. A guilty Mike watches, knowing that it was he who kissed Kate. Meanwhile, Holly creates problems by moving into Jane's bedroom, and Natalie finds Stan in the graveyard and mistakes him for Johnny. Later, Holly stirs up more trouble for Steph by threatening to tell Natalie about Duncan staying at the Halfway house. Django threatens Charlie with a knife, forcing him to tell him the truth about the death of his mother.

=== Series 3 (2002—2003) ===
| No. | Title | Directed by | Written by | Original release date |
|---|---|---|---|---|
| 157—159 (53) | TBA | Bob Tomson | Cecily Hobbs | 8 November 2002 |
Natalie struggles to have some quality time with Ryan, while Frankie and Will find themselves at each other's throats. Roxanne is released from hospital, but is still acting strangely. Alex burns all of the threatening letters, but Roxanne is still convinced that neither she nor the baby are safe. and resolves to find proof that the culprit is Nurse Bradshaw. Duncan is upset that little Stan has to leave, and decides he is not quite ready to say goodbye.
| 160—162 (54) | "Fiona's Twin" | David Winn | Bradley Quirk & Martha Jay | 15 November 2002 |
A woman turns up at the Armstrongs, claiming that Sam is the father of her baby. Roxanne is furious that Natalie seems to be covering for Woody, who may know the exact whereabouts of Danny. Dennis decides to take Alex to Woody's flat to find out the truth about his father. Fiona's identical sister Gwen arrives. Josh visits a psychic with Jane's dress, and discovers that black flowers may hold the clue to Jane's whereabouts.
| 163—165 (55) | "Fiona's Marriage Breakdown" | Jamie Payne | Catherine Steadman | 22 November 2002 |
Fiona decides to take a break away from Mike. Ryan and Natalie are both trying to stall their respective relationships from going on to the next level. When Woody tells that Natalie that their children are together, she is anxious that they are too young. During a date, Woody reveals to Natalie that he lost his virginity to Steph. Fiona is astonished to find out that Tom and Frankie are dating. Kate starts to date Dennis in order to make Sam jealous, but he's too busy planning his future with Lydia. Holly is hurt when she finds out about Dennis dating Kate.
| 166—168 (56) | "Confessions, Confessions" | Brian Farnham | Elizabeth Delaney | 29 November 2002 |
Duncan finds an old hand grenade in the garden. Roxanne and Alex decide to marry at the registry office, but when Alex fails to show up, Roxanne goes to the Halfway house to confront Steph. To make her leave (because of being a difficult situation), Steph tells her that Alex always wanted her instead of Roxanne. Events result in a number of shocking revelations, including Holly revealing that she sent those sinister text messages to Jane, Josh revealing that he never knew his parents, and Rachel revealing that she stood down from marrying her true love.
| 169—171 (57) | "Brakes in Crisis" | Tim Mercier | Jeff Dodds | 6 December 2002 |
Rachel hatches a plan to save Sam from the clutches of Lydia. The game is up for Duncan. A violent Natalie demands from Steph that she hands her husband over. Duncan asks to come home, but Natalie is furious that he could think she would have waited for so long without any word. Ryan is livid that Natalie is betraying Duncan with Woody. Josh wants an explanation from Holly about why he sent Jane those creepy text messages. When Mike and Fiona tell Tom about their separation, he is devastated.
| 172—174 (58) | "A Baby is Born" | Charles Palmer | John Jackson | 12 December 2002 |
Panic breaks out in the Wells household as Roxanne goes into labour. Alex's suspicions about Josh reach breaking point, and he decides to confront Josh at the Halfway House, where he finally learns the identity of the mystery man who had an affair with Jane before she disappeared. Dennis confronts Sam, telling him that he knows that he is only marrying Lydia to get rid of his guilt over Jane. Sam tells Dennis that he knows that Kate is only dating him to cause jealously.
| 175—177 (59) | "When Things Go Wrong" | Fraser MacDonald | Martha Jay | 19 December 2002 |
Roxanne's child is born, however, not all is as it should be. At school, Rachel notices an ad for a school play on the bulletin board, giving her the idea to write her own play. Lydia tries to convince Rachel that she really does love Sam. Tom and Frankie discuss their relationship. Dennis brings Woody to see his little baby brother.
| 178—180 (60) | "Keep on Running" | Emma Bodger | Jeff Dodds | 26 December 2002 |
Roxanne isn't coping with looking after the baby and the twins. Fiona invites Woody over for dinner, which results in an unexpected kiss. Sam returns home to find Lydia packing her bags. As Della gets ready for her date, Josh finds out about the phone call from Holly. After being punched by Dennis in the graveyard, Sam walks back home to find his belongings outside, forcing him to make a decision about his future on Thornton Street.
| 181—183 (61) | "Queen of the Ball" | Sylvie Boden | Elizabeth Delaney | 10 January 2003 |
Sam's disappearance sends shockwaves through the community. Della admits to Roxanne that she had sex with Sam in the men's toilets in the Darc Bar. Steph is worried about Josh. whose behaviour is becoming increasingly bizarre. After a shopping spree, Natalie leads Roxanne to an Intersex meeting. Celeste continuously touches up Ryan under the table over dinner, which is brought to an abrupt halt by an argument between Woody and Duncan. Rachel announces the Queen of the Ball.
| 184—186 (62) | "As Bonds Begin to Break" | Sylvie Boden | John Jackson | 17 January 2003 |
Rachel tries to sell her flat. Della seeks some advice from Charlie and Donna. Natalie finds out about what Woody did to Ryan. When Mike, Duncan and Woody have a drink at the Nautilus, Duncan spikes Woody's drink. Celeste tells Woody that she isn't really pregnant. Della and Holly finally discuss their kiss, and Della reveals that she is in love with her.
| 187—189 (63) | "The Last Goodbye" | Fraser MacDonald | Jeff Dodds | 24 January 2003 |
Celeste and Woody are having difficulties resolving the situation with her pregnancy - mainly because she's not actually pregnant. When Ryan announces his new responsibilities in front of the school, Natalie believes it's a gift from Jane, but it only complicates things even further for Celeste and Woody. Alex and Roxanne argue at the surgery on what gender they should the change the baby to. To resolve the matter between Josh and Della, Alex tells Josh that he doesn't stand a chance since she is involved with Holly.
| 190—192 (64) | "Skills of Pretense" | Emma Bodger | Martha Jay | 31 January 2003 |
Jimmy finds out from Donna and Charlie that his aunt Begonia is coming to Thornton Street to be a surrogate for them. Josh is having bizarre visions everytime he touches Jane's bloodied dress. Dennis refuses to believe that there is nothing between him and Fiona. Fiona doesn't want to see him anymore because she is afraid someone will find out, and she might get sacked. Ryan taunts Mike about his sexuality. All hell looks set to break loose when Ryan tells Fiona that Mike would like to meet her at the Darc Bar for a date.
| 193—195 (65) | "The Arrival of Aunt Begonia" | Brian Farnham | Rob Fraser | 7 February 2003 |
| 196—198 (66) | "Josh Disappears" | Brian Farnham | Martha Jay | 14 February 2003 |
| 199—201 (67) | "Josh Alexander: The Evil Beast" | Barnaby Southcombe | Martha Jay | 21 February 2003 |
| 202—204 (68) | "Creature of the Night" | Barnaby Southcombe | John Jackson | 28 February 2003 |
| 205—207 (69) | "The White Cell of Jane Harper" | Michael Ferguson | John Jackson & Adrian Pagan | 7 March 2003 |
| 208—210 (70) | "Operation: Rescue Jane" | Michael Ferguson | Tony Ramsay | 14 March 2003 |
| 211—213 (71) | "Searching & Finding" | Roberto Bangura | Elizabeth Delaney | 21 March 2003 |
| 214—216 (72) | "Jane Harper is Back" | Roberto Bangura | Martha Jay | 28 March 2003 |
| 217—219 (73) | "Blast from the Past" | Charles Palmer | Adrian Pagan | 4 April 2003 |
| 220—222 (74) | "Excorcised" | Charles Palmer | Bradley Quirk, John Jackson & Martha Jay | 11 April 2003 |
| 223—225 (75) | "Roxanne's Wedding Day" | Fraser MacDonald | Bradley Quirk & John Jackson | 18 April 2003 |
| 226—228 (76) | "Steph's Fire" | Fraser MacDonald | Adrian Pagan & Martha Jay | 25 April 2003 |
| 229—231 (77) | "An Open Marriage" | Ken Grieve | Elizabeth Delaney | 9 May 2003 |
| 232—234 (78) | "The Monster's Haunting" | Ken Grieve | John Jackson & Adrian Pagan | 16 May 2003 |
| 235—237 (79) | "The Secret's Out" | Emma Bodger & Brian Farnham | Martha Jay | 23 May 2003 |
| 238—240 (80) | "Final Hours, Final Revelations" | Emma Bodger & Brian Farnham | John Jackson & Adrian Pagan | 6 June 2003 |
