= Holmer Green Senior School =

Holmer Green Senior School (HGSS)

Location
- Parish Piece; Holmer Green, High Wycombe, Buckinghamshire, HP15 6SP; England; 51°39′56″N 0°41′53″W

Information
- Type: Academy
- Motto: ‘Work Hard, Be Kind, Have Passion’
- Specialist: Business and Enterprise school
- Department for Education URN: 138058 Tables
- Ofsted: Reports
- Headmaster: Edward Hillyard
- Gender: Coeducational
- Age: 11 to 18
- Enrolment: 1218
- Website: www.hgss.co.uk

Holmer Green Senior School is a co-educational secondary school and sixth form with academy status, located in Holmer Green, Buckinghamshire, England. The school has approximately 1220 pupils. The school shares a common catchment area with the nearby Sir William Ramsay School.

In September 2006 the school was designated by the Department for Education and Skills (DfES) as a specialist school in Business & Enterprise.

In 2008, the school was one of 34 UK secondary schools to win the NACE challenge award for its approach to able, gifted and talented children.

In 2016 the school was inspected by Ofsted and awarded a 'good' rating with inspectors saying pupils were 'exceptionally well prepared for life in modern Britain'.

== Notable former pupils ==
- James Corden, television host, actor, comedian, and singer.
- Swampy (environmentalist) (gained three GCSEs in 1989)
- Aaron Taylor-Johnson, actor

== Phone masts ==
Holmer Green Senior School is one of several Buckinghamshire schools which hosts mobile phone masts. Contracts between Buckinghamshire County Council and various mobile phone operators generate an income of £145,000 per annum, of which about £59,000 comes from contracts for masts that are installed in schools.
