= Girls in Love (TV series) =

British television series (2003–2005)

- Genre: Comedy-drama; Teen drama
- Based on: Girls in Love by Jacqueline Wilson
- Written by: Debbie Isitt; Jessica Lea; Holly Lyons; Simon Nicholson; Carol Noble; Kay Stonham; Steve Turner; Diane Whitley
- Directed by: Indra Bhose; Beryl Richards; Karen Stowe; Rachel Tillotson
- Starring: Olivia Hallinan; Amy Kwolek; Zaraah Abrahams; Ian Dunn; Sam Loggin; Adam Paul Harvey
- Narrated by: Olivia Hallinan
- Opening theme: "Party in the Club Tonight" by the Sugababes
- Composers: Paul Carr; Nick Harvey
- Country of origin: United Kingdom
- Original language: English
- No. of series: 2
- No. of episodes: 26

Production
- Executive producer: Anne Brogan
- Producers: Grainne Marmion; Diane Whitley
- Production locations: London; Manchester
- Cinematography: Roger Bonnici; David Katznelson
- Editors: Annie Kocur; Sebastian Morrison; Sue Wyatta
- Camera setup: David Budd
- Running time: 23 minutes
- Production company: Granada Media

Original release
- Network: ITV (CITV)
- Release: 1 April 2003 – 20 May 2005

Girls in Love is a British teen comedy-drama television series produced by Granada Television that aired on CITV from 1 April 2003 to 20 May 2005 for two series. It is based on the 1997 novel of the same name, both created by English author Jacqueline Wilson. The show was filmed in Manchester, England.

== Premise ==
Three teenage girls—Ellie, Magda and Nadine—are best friends that go through the somewhat weird and wonderful world of boys together. The show is narrated by Ellie, and normally portrays her life events in her sketchbook, which blends the show's live action with animation in a similar manner to the American teen sitcom Lizzie McGuire. She lives with her father and his girlfriend (later wife) Anna, and her youngest half-brother Benedict "Eggs".

== Cast and characters ==
- Olivia Hallinan as Eleanor ”Ellie” Allard, narrated from her perspective, often told through her drawings and writings in her journal. Her mother died when she was 5 years old.
- Zaraah Abrahams as Magda Burton, also one of Ellie and Nadine's best friends, after they met in secondary school. She attracts boys and has a loud personality.
- Amy Kwolek as Nadine Foster, Ellie's best friend since they were little. She is said to have a "wild child" reputation and is also goth.
- Ian Dunn as Mark Allard, Ellie's father, widowed when her mother died, remarried to Anna.
- Sam Loggin as Anna Allard, Ellie's stepmother, much younger than her father. Ellie and Anna soon start to be friends after having their ups and downs in the first few episodes.
- Adam Paul Harvey as Russell, Ellie's boyfriend then later her ex-boyfriend. Like Ellie, he is interested in art. Is in year eleven at his school, Halmer High. Becomes Ellie's ex-boyfriend in the episode "The Unforgiven" after Russell cheats on Ellie. They almost get back together in episode "The Ex Factor" but Russell cheats on her again.
- Dale Barker as Greg, Magda's on-and-off again boyfriend.
- Nick Schofield as Liam, Nadine's sleazy, but extremely good-looking, ex-boyfriend who had a reputation for using girls for sex.
- Tom Woodland as Dan, Ellie's "kind-of" boyfriend before Russell. He should be in Year 8, but because of his intelligence he was moved up a year, to Year 9. They met at during the summer holidays but Ellie and Dan split up and Dan gets another girlfriend.
- Alp Haydar as Darius, new American exchange student that becomes friends with Ellie, Magda and Nadine. Magda and Ellie both develop crushes on Darius, and Magda and Darius eventually go out but it doesn't work out, and in the last episode at a school dance Ellie and Darius kiss (which Magda doesn't mind).
- Gemma Wolk as Natasha, Nadine's spoiled, manipulative younger sister.
- Julian Kay as Mr Green, Ellie, Magda and Nadine's art teacher, who Magda has a crush on.
- Clare Wille as Miss Henderson, Ellie, Magda and Nadine's tutor and P.E teacher in year 9. She is usually strict and often unfair on the girls.

== Episodes ==
=== Series 1 (2003) ===
No. overall	No. in series	Title	Directed by	Original release date
1	1	"My Big Lie"	Beryl Richards	1 April 2003
It's the start of Year 9 but Ellie wishes she'd stayed in bed. When Magda and Nadine boast of endless snogging, Ellie fibs with tales of a holiday romance. Magda sets up a triple-date - will Ellie find a boyfriend in time?
2	2	"Getting Lippy"	Beryl Richards	8 April 2003
It's the house party everyone's been talking about. Ellie sees beyond Dan's geeky exterior and at last gets her first kiss. But regret soon follows when the horrible truth about Dan is revealed.
3	3	"How to Look Eighteen"	Beryl Richards	15 April 2003
It's tough being a teenager, and the embarrassment of discovering that Dan is only 12 makes Ellie determined to improve her image. After a night out with her friends, Ellie discovers that pretending to be older isn't much fun.
4	4	"Drop the Boy"	Beryl Richards	22 April 2003
Ellie's speechless when her father and Anna announce that they're getting married. It calls for immediate action - she can't go to the wedding without a date. Dan is the obvious choice, but he will only agree to go as her boyfriend.
5	5	"Express Yourself"	Beryl Richards	29 April 2003
Both Ellie and her father have bad cases of wedding day nerves. The image of Dan and his new girlfriend keeps popping into her head, then Dad disappears. It's up to Ellie to sort things out before the day is ruined.
6	6	"After the Happy Ending"	Beryl Richards	6 May 2003
Why isn't Ellie feeling fantastic? She and Dan have spent the holidays together but something's missing. The chemistry's not there so she ends it. But before she has time to miss him, her father and Anna reveal some shocking news.
7	7	"Cuckoo in the Nest"	Beryl Richards	13 May 2003
With a new baby about to steal the limelight, Ellie decides to think positive and help Anna. Magda offers up some serious eye-candy to cheer her up but despite some sharp flirting they discover their target isn't into girls.
8	8	"Does My Face Look Fat?"	Rachel Tillotson	20 May 2003
Ellie discovers that Dan has a new girlfriend - even worse she's stick thin. Ellie suddenly feels fat and unattractive so Magda suggests a trip to the swimming pool. While Ellie gets some exercise, Magda chats to a hunk.
9	9	"Girls Get Even"	Rachel Tillotson	27 May 2003
The girls are officially depressed and decide that revenge is the best medicine: Magda plans some poolside payback, Nadine humiliates her nasty sister and Ellie deals with Dan's new girlfriend.
10	10	"Girls Out Late"	Rachel Tillotson	3 June 2003
Greg announces his undying love for Magda, Nadine receives a love letter from a secret admirer, so Ellie is the only singleton once again. But then she meets Russell and it seems her luck is about to change.
11	11	"Two's Company"	Rachel Tillotson	10 June 2003
Ellie is officially in love - it's magical, wonderful and all consuming - and everyone else is being neglected. Magda and Nadine are horrified but it's not until Anna is rushed to hospital that Ellie discovers...is it too late?
12	12	"The Secret Diary of Ellie Allard"	Rachel Tillotson	17 June 2003
Ellie sneaks a peek at Russell's sketchbook and is shocked to see that he's secretly read her diary. Magda falls for the art teacher, Mr Green. She does everything to catch his eye but all she gets is a dose of embarrassment.
13	13	"Girls in Trouble"	Rachel Tillotson	24 June 2003
Life seems perfect for Ellie until a concert with the girls clashes with Russell's school dance. She knows she should tell him the truth, but sometimes lies just spill out. Russell is unimpressed when he discovers the truth.

=== Series 2 (2005) ===
No. overall	No. in series	Title	Directed by	Original release date
14	1	"Birthday Girl"	Indra Bhose	18 February 2005
Everything's going wonderfully in Ellie's world until she decides to leave her birthday celebrations in the hands of her nearest and dearest friends. They may all love her, but it doesn't mean they all love each other.
15	2	"Life Experience"	Indra Bhose	25 February 2005
Ellie is thrilled, relieved and a little bit nervous when she sorts out work experience with a local artist. She comes upon an art entry by Russell - which is remarkably similar to her own. Should she be flattered or furious?
16	3	"The L-Word"	Indra Bhose	4 March 2005
Ellie's romance cup is running over but Magda and Nadine's need refilling. So what better solution than a match-make with Russell's two best mates and what better opportunity than Russell's party?
17	4	"The Unforgiven"	Indra Bhose	11 March 2005
Things are bad. Ellie hates Russell and Magda. The timing for this major bust-up couldn't be worse: the three girls are due to be smiling on the front cover of their favourite teen mag.
18	5	"Young, Gifted and Single"	Indra Bhose	18 March 2005
Ellie, Magda and Nadine decide to work on their careers - NO flirting, NO dates and absolutely NO batting eyelashes for a whole month. Then, the Italian foreign exchange vacation boys arrive. Mamma Mia.
19	6	"Her Boy Friday"	Indra Bhose	1 April 2005
Everyone's busy busy busy - except Ellie. What she needs is a new love interest and comes up with the perfect plan: if you want to get to know boys, you have to hang out where they do - the football ground.
20	7	"The Crush"	Indra Bhose	8 April 2005
Ellie has discovered the man of her dreams, her perfect match and, as if fate had decreed it, he works at the diner. Ellie gets the text message of her dreams, but dreams can so easily turn to nightmares.
21	8	"The Ex-Factor"	Karen Stowe	15 April 2005
Ellie has to fund her own mobile phone habit. So a paper round it has to be - even though she looks and feels like a complete reptile in the get-up. A bad situation gets worse when her ex's house is on her round.
22	9	"The Experiment"	Karen Stowe	22 April 2005
The girls are conducting an experiment based on their conclusion that romance is doomed. Their guinea pig is new boy Darius. He's cute, PLUS he has a girlfriend in the USA, so he's completely out-of-bounds.
23	10	"All's Fair in Love and War"	Karen Stowe	29 April 2005
School trip! Three days in nature, doing adventurous outdoor things, with your three best mates. Could be fun, normally would be fun - except that Ellie is still angry with Magda. But is it anger? Or could it be jealousy?
24	11	"The Bigger Picture"	Karen Stowe	6 May 2005
The walls are closing in on Ellie. She learns that her friend Darius doesn't like his girlfriend Magda as much as Ellie's best friend Magda likes Darius, who just happens to be the boy that Ellie fancies. Sort that one out.
25	12	"Baby Blues"	Karen Stowe	13 May 2005
It's Eggs' naming ceremony, but the festivities can't commence until Magda's dear hamster has been given a respectful Goth farewell. Poor Magda has had to admit that her heart has been broken, but not just by Hammy.
26	13	"True Romance"	Karen Stowe	20 May 2005
It's the end of term and that means a school dance. And the school dance in its turn can only mean you HAVE to have a date. Ellie knows who she'd love her date to be - Darius - but he's not even part of the gang any more. (Final episode)

== Telecast and home release ==
Girls in Love was repeated for the first time since 2005 on CITV's digital channel from September 2010. The TV series was also repeated on Australia's children channel ABC3 in 2010 and most recently repeated in June 2016. In Canada it was shown on BBC Kids (until its closure in 2018). In America, it aired on Showtime Family Zone. As of 2025, there have been no official streaming releases, but majority of the episodes are available via unofficial uploads to YouTube.

=== VHS/DVD (Region 2) ===
- VHS – Video Collection International Ltd./DVD – ITV Studios Home Entertainment.
  - Girls in Love (DVD – 29 Dec. 2003) – My Big Lie, Getting Lippy, How to Look Eighteen, Drop the Boy, and Express Yourself
  - Girls in Love 2 (DVD – 17 May 2004) – Girls Out Late, Two's Company, The Secret Diary of Ellie Allard, and Girls in Trouble
  - Girls in Tears (DVD – 18 April 2005) – Birthday Girl, Life Experience, The L-Word, and The Unforgiven
  - The Jacqueline Wilson Collection (DVD – 17 October 2005) – Girls in Love (episodes 1–5, Girls in Love 2 (episodes 10–13), Girls in Tears (episodes 1–4), and New Friends.

The DVD releases are episodes strung into films with music changes, due to copyright reasons. The remaining 4 episodes of Series 1 and the last 9 shows of Series 2 have not had official DVD releases.
