= Bedtime (TV series) =

- Created by: Andy Hamilton
- Starring: Timothy West; Sheila Hancock; Series 1: David Gillespie; Emma Pierson; Claire Skinner; Meera Syal; Stephen Tompkinson; Series 2: Alun Armstrong; Adam Paul Harvey; Doon MacKichan; Kevin McNally; Sienna Miller
- Country of origin: United Kingdom
- No. of series: 3
- No. of episodes: 15

Production
- Running time: 30 minutes
- Production company: Hat Trick Productions

Original release
- Network: BBC One
- Release: 28 August 2001 – 17 December 2003

Bedtime is a British comedy drama written and directed by Andy Hamilton and broadcast by the BBC. It first aired on 1 August 2001, and ran for three series for a total of fifteen episodes through December 2003. The first two series had six episodes each and the third series had three episodes. All three series have been released on DVD.

The main characters are Andrew and Alice Oldfield, played by Timothy West and Sheila Hancock.

== Plot ==
The story centres around the bedtime conversations of couples – or in one case a father and son – living in terraced houses in Ealing, London.

An older married couple, Andrew and Alice Oldfield (played by Timothy West and Sheila Hancock), appear in all three series. Their neighbours in the first series are a young couple (Claire Skinner and Stephen Tompkinson) with a new baby, and an aspiring actress (Emma Pierson) targeted by a reporter (Meera Syal) hoping to write an exposé on her boyfriend (David Gillespie). The Oldfields are worried about their daughter in America whose husband may be abusive.

In the second series, Andrew Oldfield is annoyed by the noise made by Kurdish men from a nearby hostel. His wife writes a letter to the local paper in support of the hostel, causing her to be ostracised by her friends. Andrew also becomes worried that he may have Alzheimer's. Meanwhile, one neighbour (Kevin McNally) is given an ultimatum by his girlfriend (Doon Mackichan), while on the other side, widower Neil Henshall (Alun Armstrong) tries to find out what's troubling his son Ralph (Adam Paul Harvey). Ralph is visited by his girlfriend (Sienna Miller) and the Oldfields receive a visit from an old friend (James Bolam). A burglary at the Oldfields' house casts suspicion on various parties.

The third series has three episodes titled "Christmas Eve", "Christmas Day" and "Boxing Day". Neil Stuke and Fay Ripley featured in all three editions as a young couple preparing for Christmas with their children.
