= Hazlemere =

Village in Buckinghamshire, England

Coordinates: 51.651199°N 0.711237°W

- Village and civil parish
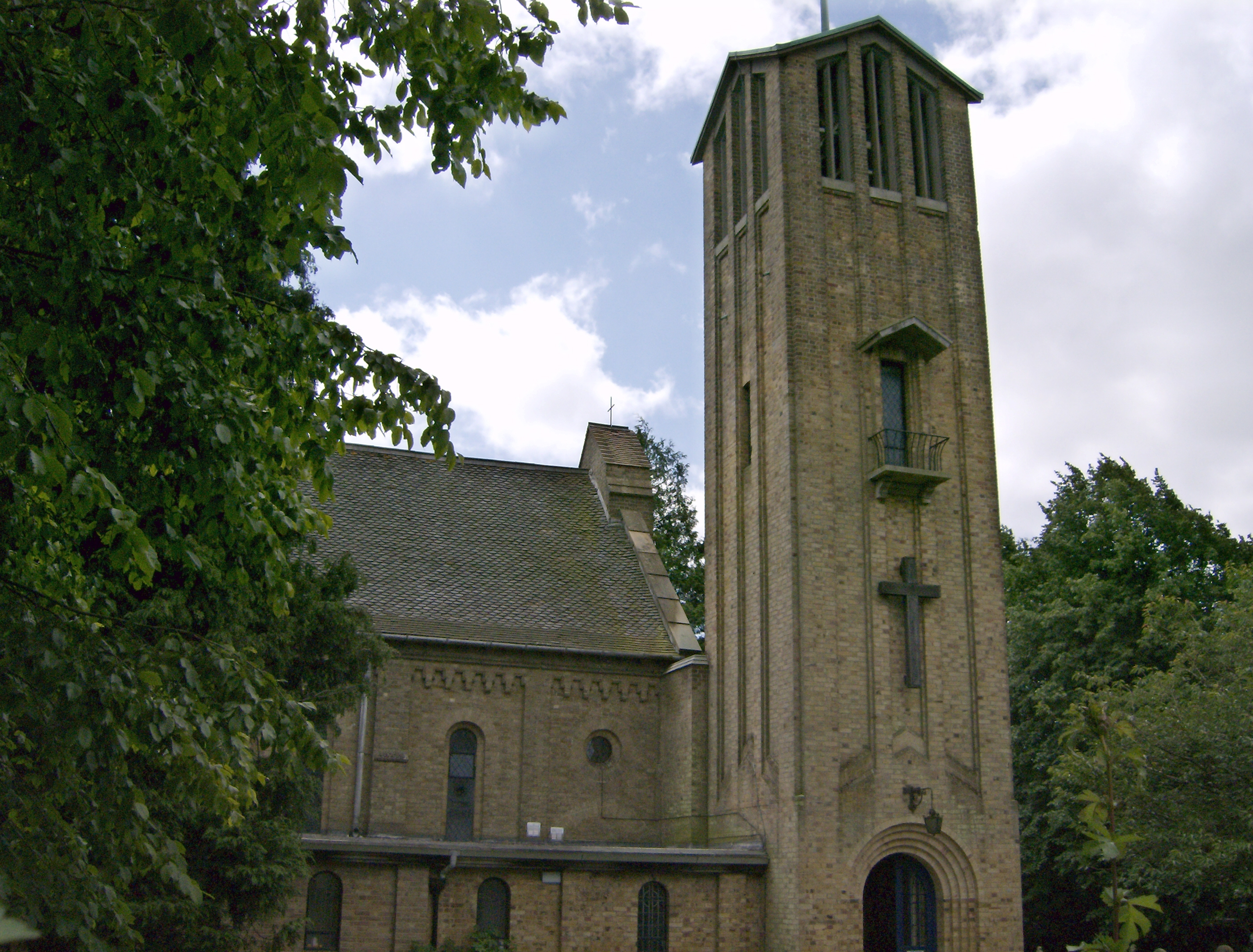
- Holy Trinity Church, Hazlemere

- Location within Buckinghamshire
- Area: 1.64 sq mi (4.2 km^{2})
- Population: 9,623
  - Density: 5,868/sq mi (2,266/km^{2})
- OS grid reference: SU891955
- Unitary authority: Buckinghamshire
- Ceremonial county: Buckinghamshire
- Region: South East
- Country: England
- Sovereign state: United Kingdom
- Post town: High Wycombe
- Postcode district: HP15
- Dialling code: 01494
- Police: Thames Valley
- Fire: Buckinghamshire
- Ambulance: South Central
- UK Parliament: Chesham and Amersham
- Website: Hazlemere Parish Council

Hazlemere is a village and civil parish in Buckinghamshire, England, 2.5 miles (4.0 km) northeast of High Wycombe on the A404 leading to Amersham, which intersects with the B474 at Hazlemere. To the north of the village is the hamlet of Holmer Green, which is in the civil parish of Little Missenden.

== History ==
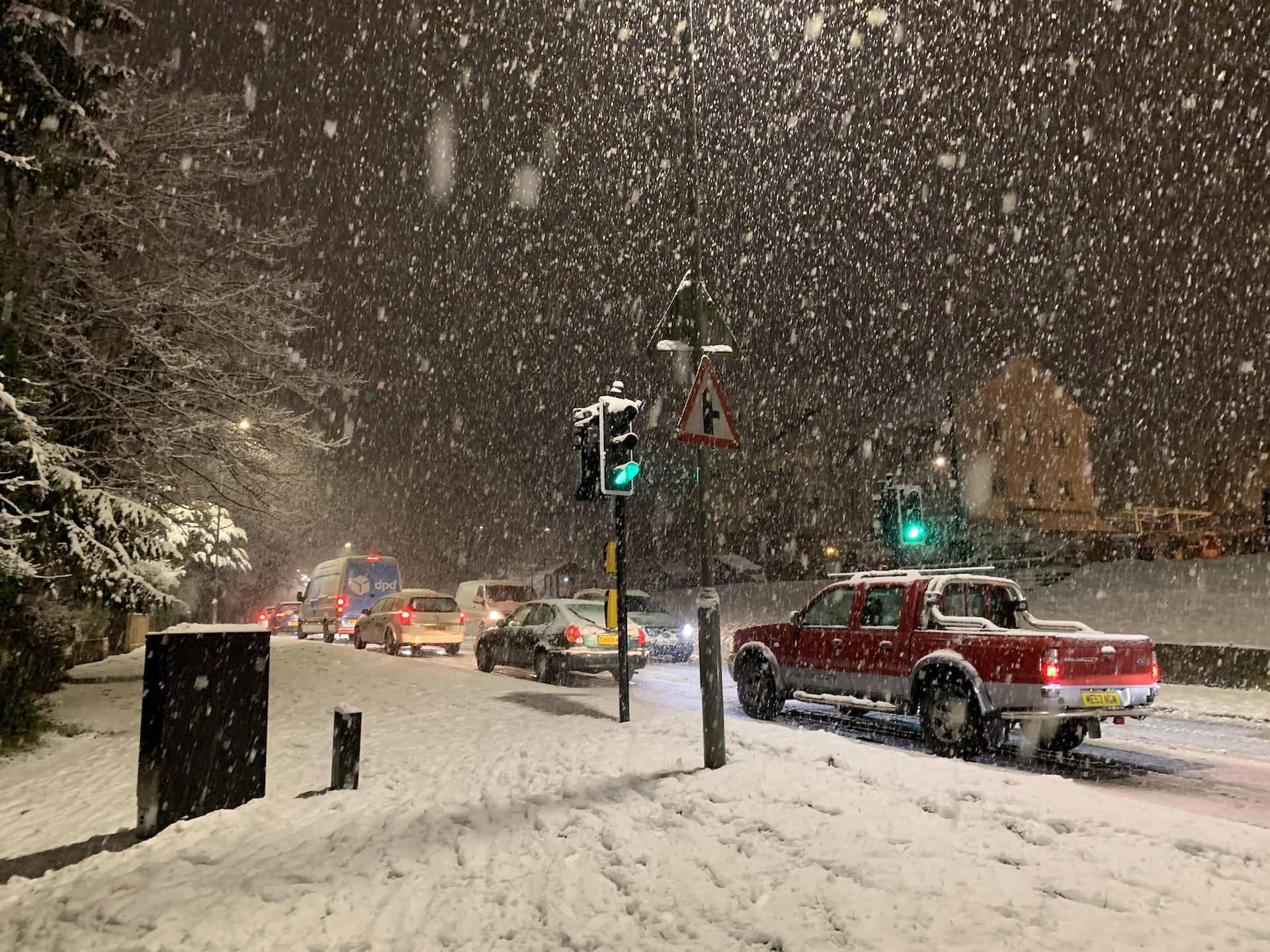
Hazlemere in the snow

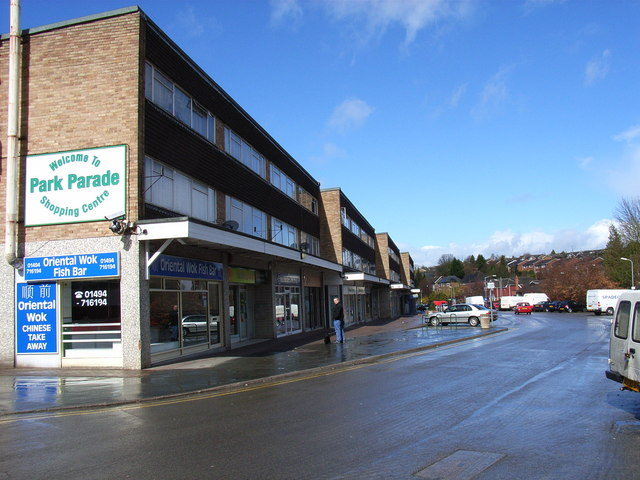
Park Parade shops in 2006

Hazlemere was a small hamlet in the ancient Desborough Hundred, and the name is recorded as long ago as the 13th century. The crossroads at the centre of the village was originally the meeting point of three different parishes, Penn, Hughenden, and Chepping Wycombe. The ecclesiastical parish of Hazlemere was formed in 1847 when the population was recorded as 766.

At the beginning of the 20th century, farming was still the primary industry in the area and in Edwardian times a large proportion of the area was devoted to cherry orchards. Brickmaking was carried out at the Old Kiln and at Oakengrove. By the 1930s, the area was losing its rural character, and indiscriminate building was increasing, stopped only by the outbreak of the Second World War, when a prisoner of war camp was constructed in the grounds of Hazlemere Park. After the war, the camp was used as temporary accommodation for refugees from the war in Europe. The camp was closed in 1956.

The 1960s and 1970s saw an increase in housing. Huge developments took place on the Park, and Brackley, Hill, and Manor Farms. No provision was made for leisure, and it was not until 1976 with the efforts of the Residents' and the Community Associations that Hazlemere got its own library and Community Centre. In 1987, Hazlemere became a parish.

== Notable residents ==
- James Corden, actor, comedian, television personality, television presenter
- Sir Geoffrey de Havilland, aviator and aircraft designer, whose father had been the curate at Holy Trinity church
- Sir William Ramsay, Nobel prize-winning chemist (lived in Hazlemere until his death in 1916)
- Leigh-Anne Pinnock, Little Mix Singer
- Stevyn Colgan, Author and QI 'elf'

== Schools and nurseries ==
Schools in the village include Hazlemere Church of England School (opened in 1847), Cedar Park School to the north, with Manor Farm Community Junior School and Sir William Ramsay School to the south.

- Little Roo's Day Nursey
- Little Cherubs Day Nursery
- Manor Farm Pre-School
- Come & Play Pre-School
- The House That Jack Built Nursery
- Manor Farm Community Infant School
- Manor Farm Community Junior School
- Cedar Park School
- Hazlemere Church of England School (incorporating Hazlemere C of E Nursery)
- Sir William Ramsay Secondary School

== Politics and public administration ==
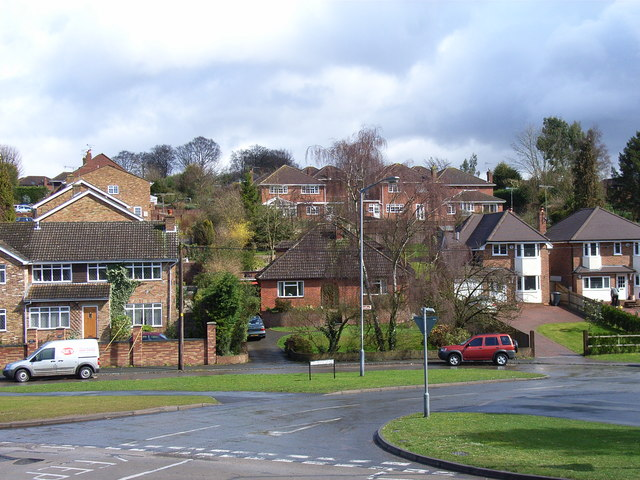
Houses in the north of Hazlemere

As of August 2020, Hazlemere has two electoral wards. However, the new Buckinghamshire Council does not use the existing ward boundaries, and instead has a single unitary ward for Hazlemere; this ward elects five councillors in total. Hazlemere North and Hazlemere South are part of the Wycombe Parliamentary constituency.

Prior to the creation of a single unitary authority in April 2020, Hazlemere's two electoral wards each elected two councillors to Wycombe District Council, and a single councillor to Buckinghamshire County Council.

Hazlemere has had its own parish council since 1987, with 12 parish councillors – six for each electoral ward.

== Demography ==
In the 2011 Census, Hazlemere parish had a population of 9,623. The average (mean) age of residents was 41.6 years.

The ethnicity was 92.5% white, 1.9% mixed race, 3.9% Asian, 1.2% black and 0.5% other. The place of birth of residents was 92.4% United Kingdom, 0.5% Republic of Ireland, 1.8% other European Union countries, and 5.3% elsewhere. Religion was recorded as 67.3% Christian, 0.4% Buddhist, 1.1% Hindu, 0.5% Sikh, 0.2% Jewish, and 1.4% Muslim. 22.4% were recorded as having no religion, 0.1% had an alternative religion and 6.5% did not state their religion.

The economic activity of residents aged 16–74 was 40.8% in full-time employment, 15.5% in part-time employment, 12.9% self-employed, 1.9% unemployed, 2.8% students with jobs, 3.5% students without jobs, 16.5% retired, 3.8% looking after home or family, 1.2% permanently sick or disabled and 1.1% economically inactive for other reasons. The industry of employment of residents was 17.7% retail, 11.5% education, 10.6% health and social work, 9.4% professional, scientific and technical activities, 8.7% manufacturing, 8.1% construction, with 44% of residents in employment working in other fields.
