= Julie Smith (actress) =

British actress

Julie Smith is a British actress who is probably best known for her roles as Kate Ellis in the ITV soap Night and Day (2002–2003) and Lucy Day in Channel 5's Family Affairs (2002–2005). She has also appeared in a number of other television series, notably The Bill, Dream Team and Casualty. She has also appeared in several films including the 1998 drama I Want You and can also be seen in the video for Travis's 1999 single "Turn". She was nominated for an award at the 2003 British Soap Awards as sexiest female for her role as Lucy Day in Family Affairs.

She is sometimes credited as Julia Lee Smith.

== Filmography ==
- Agatha Christie's Poirot (1992)
- Boston Kickout (1995) – Mandy
- Chandler & Co (1995) – Kim
- Beautiful Thing (1996) – Gina
- Silent Witness (1996) – Sarah
- The Bill (1997) – Amy Massie
- Sex & Chocolate (1997) – Lauren
- No Child of Mine (1997) – Carly
- Made in Canada (1998)
- Casualty (1998) – Kelly
- Ultraviolet (1998) – Sal
- I Want You (1998)
- Dream Team (1998–1999) – Julie Alexander
- Angel in Training (1999)
- Attachments (2000) – Kerry
- The Bill (2000) – Lisa Harding
- Night and Day (2002–2003) – Kate Ellis
- Family Affairs (2002–2005) – Lucy Day
- The Golden Hour (2005) – Della Richards
