= Girls in Love (novel) =

1997 novel by Jacqueline Wilson

- First edition
- Author: Jacqueline Wilson
- Illustrator: Nick Sharratt
- Language: English
- Series: the Girls series
- Genre: Young adult
- Publisher: Corgi Books
- Publication date: 1997
- Publication place: United Kingdom
- Media type: Print (Paperback)
- Pages: 200 pages
- ISBN: 9780552557337 (0552557331)
- Followed by: Girls under Pressure

Girls in Love is the first book in the Girls series written by British author Jacqueline Wilson, first published in 1997. The story is about three 13-year-olds exploring romance, both real and fantasized. It was adapted into the TV series Girls in Love in 2003, produced by Granada Television and aired on ITV.

The other books in the series are Girls Under Pressure (1998), Girls out Late (1999), and Girls in Tears (2002).

== Plot summary ==
The novel is narrated by Eleanor Allard, a.k.a. Ellie. The book opens with Ellie's family holiday to Wales where she meets a nerdy boy named Dan. Dan falls for Ellie and asks her out but his feelings are not reciprocated and Ellie turns him down. Ellie arrives back at school after the summer holidays to find one of her best friends, Nadine, has a new boyfriend named Liam. Her other best friend, Magda, soon starts dating a boy named Greg. Feeling left out, Ellie makes up a fictional boyfriend, who is based on a young, good looking man that she sees nearly every day on her way to school. She names her fictional boyfriend Dan (like the nerdy boy she met in Wales) and describes him as 15 years old and handsome. Magda and Ellie soon start to suspect that Liam is pressuring Nadine for sex as Nadine starts to act out of character after spending time with Liam. Magda mentions her and Ellie's concerns to Nadine which upsets her and causes the girls to fall out, though they later reconcile.

One night, to celebrate Magda's birthday, the three girls sneak out to a night club called "Seventh Heaven" and it is confirmed that Liam was indeed only using Nadine for sex when they meet some other girls that had been Liam's conquests. Nadine confronts Liam and he states he had planned to break up with Nadine after she 'put out' (had sex with him).

At a party thrown by a mutual friend of the trio, Dan turns up unannounced, and Ellie is mortified and has to come clean about the 'Real Dan', however, when gatecrashers arrive at the party and cause trouble, Dan intervenes and saves the day. To Ellie's surprise, this impresses Magda and Nadine and causes Ellie to rethink her first impressions of Dan. The book ends with Ellie and Dan's first kiss.

== Characters ==
=== The girls ===
- Ellie - Witty and artistic, the book starts by meeting a thirteen-year-old Ellie in Year 9. She has curly hair, a passion for art and is self-conscious about her weight and appearance.
- Magda - Ellie and Nadine's best friend whom they befriended at the start of secondary school. Magda is beautiful, popular, confident and optimistic. She attracts a lot of male attention.
- Nadine - Ellie's childhood best friend. Nadine is a tall, thin and striking goth. Her wild, rebellious attitude tends to get her into trouble.

=== Ellie's family ===
- Benedict "Eggs" - Ellie's younger half-brother.
- Dad - Ellie's father, remarried Anna after Ellie's mother died. He is an artist and tutor at the local college.
- Anna - Ellie's step mother, who is much younger than her father. Attractive and kind, she and Ellie often fight despite the fact they truly care for each other.

=== Other characters ===
- Russell - Ellie's boyfriend, who is first introduced in the 3rd book, Girls Out Late. Like Ellie, he is interested in art. He is two years older than Ellie, and is in Year Eleven at his school, Halmer High.
- Dan - Ellie's "kind-of" boyfriend before Russell. He should be in Year Eight, but because of his intelligence he was moved up a year, to year Nine. They met at during a summer holiday, in Wales, and they wrote letters to each other when they got back. Dan 'stayed' with Ellie once. Dan now has another girlfriend, Gail.
- Natasha - Nadine's little sister. She is a spoiled and slightly manipulative little girl who acts cute in front of her parents, but is a nightmare in front of Nadine, Ellie, and Magda. She is friends with Benedict "Eggs".
- Kevin - An older student whom Ellie develops a crush on in the first book. Later, they become friends and Ellie starts to flirt with Kevin, but to her shock she finds out that he is gay. Ellie has a habit of 'bumping into him'.
- Liam - Nadine's sleazy, but extremely good-looking, ex-boyfriend who had a reputation for using girls for sex. Nadine claimed to be in love with him in the book Girls In Love.
- Greg - Magda's boyfriend, a student at Anderson High School for Boys. He wears a lot of hair gel to darken his naturally red hair. He gives Magda one of his pet hamsters in the book Girls In Tears.
- Mrs. Henderson - Ellie, Magda and Nadine's form tutor and P.E teacher in Year Nine. She is usually strict and often unfair with the girls, but she becomes very concerned with Ellie in the book Girls Under Pressure when she notices how much weight Ellie loses.
- Mr Windsor (Mr Green) - Ellie, Magda and Nadine's art teacher, who Magda has a crush on.

== Reception ==
In 2001, Publishers Weekly described Ellie's first-person narration style in Girls in Love as having "a Bridget Jones-like energy and compulsiveness", recommending it as "funny" and "a breezy read".
