= Kindle Entertainment =

English television production company

- Company type: Subsidiary
- Industry: Entertainment
- Predecessor: ITV Kids (ITV Productions)
- Founded: 2007; 18 years ago
- Founders: Anne Brogan; Melanie Stokes
- Headquarters: London, England
- Key people: Melanie Stokes (Founder MD); Emma Stuart (Creative Director)
- Owner: Lionsgate UK (25%; 2015–2019)
- Parent: Banijay Kids & Family (2022–present)
- Website: www.kindleentertainment.co.uk

Kindle Entertainment is an independent television production company based in London, England. Kindle Entertainment was formed by Anne Brogan, the former controller of ITV Kids, and former head of development at ITV Kids, Melanie Stokes after ITV Kids (a section of ITV Productions) was closed. The company is currently owned by Banijay Entertainment, via its Banijay Kids & Family division.

Recent productions include Sky Kids' Little Darlings, teen supernatural thriller The A List for the BBC iPlayer and the Channel 4 drama Kiss Me First.

Kindle Entertainment's previous productions include: Dixi an interactive mystery set in the world of social networking, Minibeast Adventure with Jess, fact-ent for pre-schoolers; a series of behind-the-scenes documentaries about Harry Potter including specials on The Goblet of Fire, Order of the Phoenix, Deathly Hallows – Part 1 and Deathly Hallows – Part 2 as part of Harry Potter: Behind the Magic and Harry Potter: The Costume Drama; the live-action action comedy My Spy Family, which was shown on Boomerang; three series of the puppet show Big & Small; Dustbin Baby, adapted from the book written by Jacqueline Wilson; Jinx following the story of Lulu Baker, a teenage girl who is able to cast spells from her magic cookbook; the CBeebies series Get Well Soon Hospital, a pre-school show that eases children's fears about illness' and going to the doctor's surgery; The Life and Adventures of Nick Nickleby, a modern retelling of the Charles Dickens classic; Some Dogs Bite; two series of Leonardo for CBBC, a drama telling the adventures of a teenage Leonardo da Vinci and his friends; and the two part mini-series, Treasure Island starring Eddie Izzard and Elijah Wood for Sky One.

== History ==
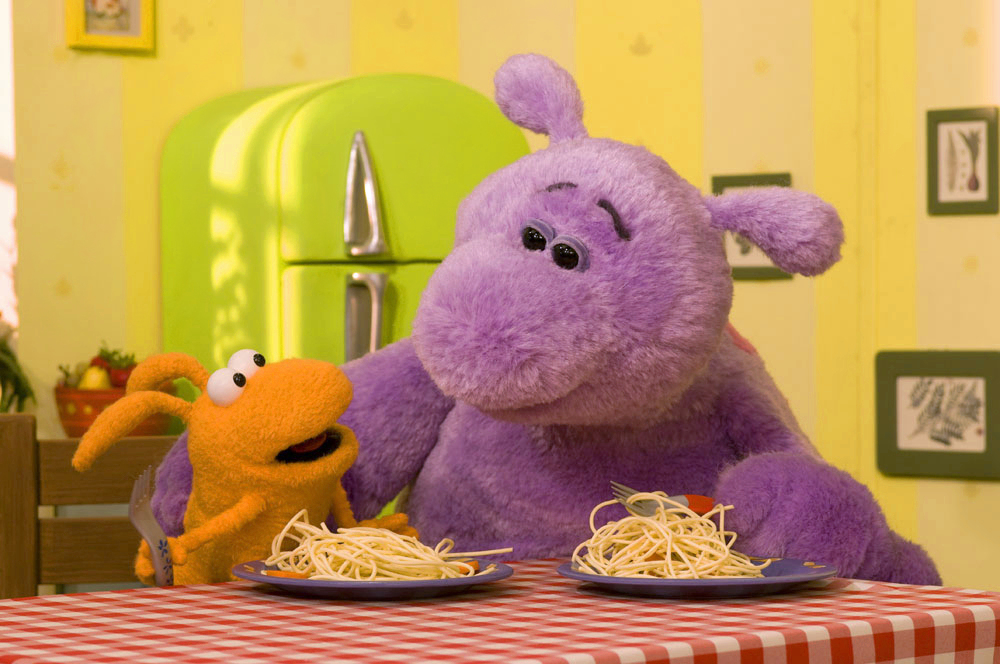
Big (right) and Small from Kindle's preschool comedy Big & Small

Kindle Entertainment is an independent company that was formed upon the closure of the Kids department of ITV Productions. Kindle's director, Anne Brogan, who was formerly controller of ITV Kids, formed the company with her colleague Melanie Stokes, who was formerly head of development at ITV Kids. Kindle's first productions were Harry Potter: Behind the Magic and Harry Potter: The Costume Drama, shown in July 2009 on ITV1. Harry Potter: Behind the Magic was a one-off one hour documentary presented by Ben Shephard. The documentary looked behind the scenes of Harry Potter and the Half-Blood Prince and featured interviews with the cast. Kindle's second project was My Spy Family, a live action action family sitcom television series following the Bannons. The Bannon parents are former spies. The show, which spanned multiple series, was a co-production between Kindle, Warner Bros. and Turner Broadcasting, and was shown on Boomerang.

Kindle Entertainment's third production, Big & Small was shown on BBC1, BBC2 and CBeebies in the UK, it was also shown on Cyw in Wales, with a total of over 40 channels worldwide airing the show. To produce the show, Kindle Entertainment worked with 3J's Entertainment and Sixteen South for the BBC, Treehouse TV and Studio 100. Big & Small is a puppet comedy aimed at pre-school children following the characters Big and Small which, every episode, features a song. Both Big and Small are voiced by Lenny Henry, and Imelda Staunton voices the other main characters. Kindle and Start Licensing have made deals to merchandise the programme with indoor- and outdoor-clothing, nightwear and underwear lines. In 2009, Big & Small Online (part of CBeebies Online) was awarded the Children's BAFTA for interactive content. Kindle Entertainment went on to win the BAFTA for Best Independent Production Company of the Year in 2010, 2011 and 2014.

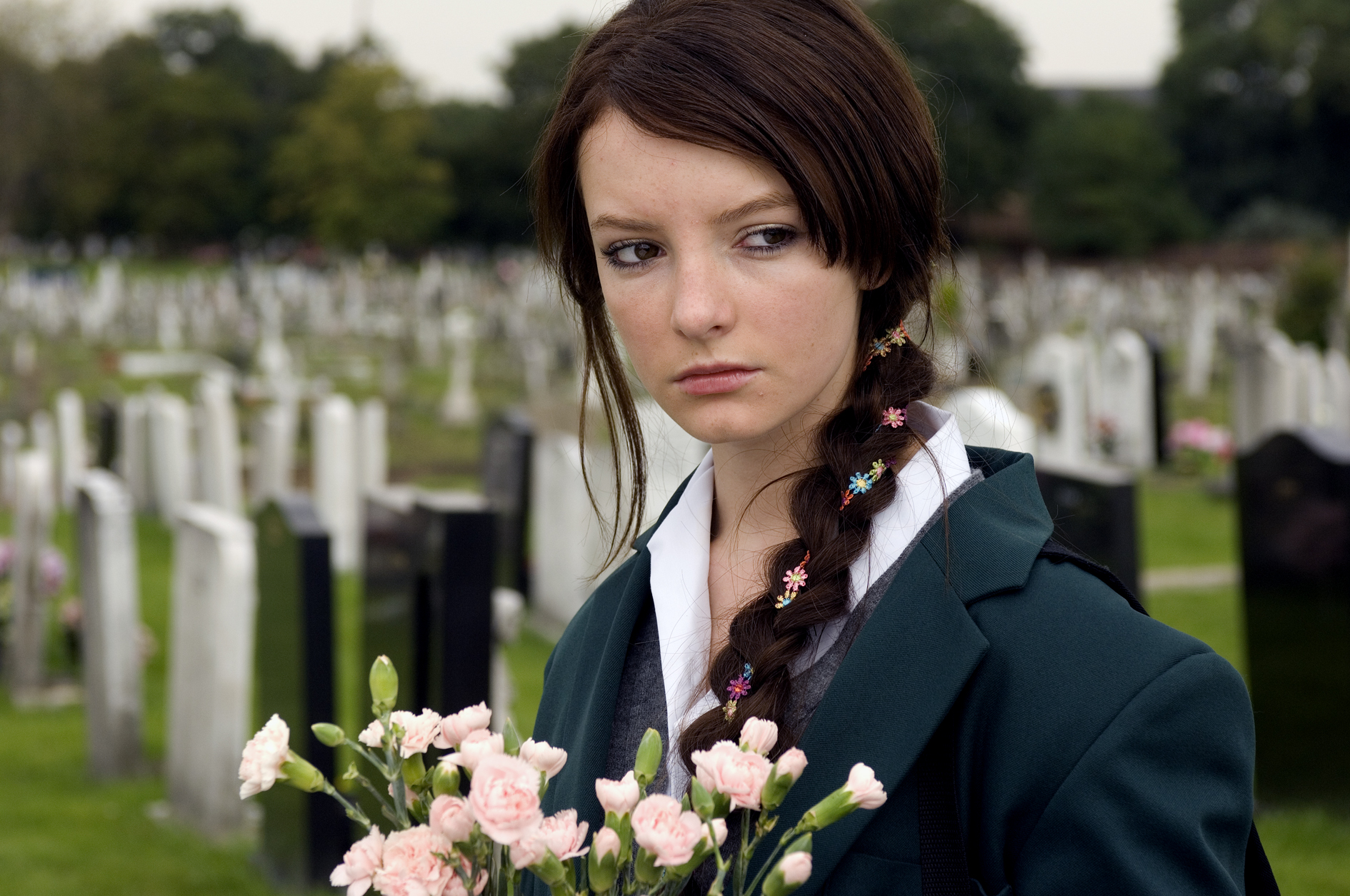
Dakota Blue Richards as April in Dustbin Baby, Kindle Entertainment's first single drama

Kindle Entertainment's first single drama was the television film Dustbin Baby, shown on BBC1 on 21 December 2008. An adaptation of Jacqueline Wilson's novel of the same name, the screenplay was written by Helen Blakeman, for which she won a British Academy Children's Award for best writer, and the film starred Dakota Blue Richards as April, a 14-year-old girl abandoned as a baby, and Juliet Stevenson as Marion, her adoptive mother. The film also starred David Haig. Dustbin Baby was received positively by both Wilson, who said it was the best ever film adaption of her work, and critics. In an article in The Times David Chater awarded the programme the TV choice of the day, describing it as "tremendous", and "the wonderful surprise of Christmas". The Telegraph described the film as a "rare treat", as it is "something that teenagers and parents can watch together". The film was released on DVD in January 2009. In 2009, Dustbin Baby won an International Emmy Award in the children and young people category at the 37th International Emmy Awards, and was nominated for a British Academy Children's Award in the drama category, as well as being shortlisted for the BAFTA Kid's vote.

On 31 October 2009, Kindle Entertainment's show Jinx aired for the first time on CBBC. The first series consisted of 13 episodes of 30 minutes. Jinx follows the story of Lulu Baker, a teenage girl who is able to cast spells thanks to her magical cookbook, and stars Amber Beattie, Michael Nardone, Lucy Chalkley and Chizzy Akudolu, and featured a large number of special effects. The show is based on the Lulu Baker trilogy by author Fiona Dunbar.

== Personnel ==
- Anne Brogan – co-director
- Melanie Stokes – co-director
- Sacha Whitmarsh - head of production
- Pia Ashberry – executive producer
- Emma Stuart - executive producer
- Harriet Hammond - production executive
- Chloe Lansley - development editor

== Awards ==
2009

- International Emmy Award Winner- Children's and Young People, 'Dustbin Baby'
- BAFTA Winner Children's – Best Writer, 'Dustbin Baby'
- BAFTA Winner in Children's – Best Interactive Content, 'Big & Small'
- International Academy of Television Arts & Sciences – Winner for Children and Young People's, 'Dustbin Baby'

2010

- BAFTA Winner Children's – Best Independent Production Company
- British Film Festival, Nantes – Winner of the Audience Award, 'Some Dogs Bite'

2011

- BAFTA Winner Children's – Best Independent Production Company
- BANFF Rocky Mountain Award Nominee – Best Youth (13+) Fiction Programme, ‘Some Dogs Bite’
- International Film Festival European Children's Film Association – Jury Award for Children & Young Audience, 'Some Dogs Bite'

2012

- Royal Television Society – Best Children's Programme, 'Big & Small'
- The Chicago International Film Festival Television Awards – Gold Plaque for Children's Series, 'Big & Small'
- Kidscreen – Best TV Movie/Mini-Series for Tweens/Teens, 'Some Dogs Bite'
- Kidscreen – Best Show, 'Leonardo'
- Kidscreen – Best Music, 'Leonardo'
- Kidscreen – Best Design for non-animated/mixed series for Tweens/Teens, 'Leonardo'

2013

- Kidscreen of Brunico – Best Writing in Creative Talent, 'Big & Small'

2014

- BAFTA Winner Children's – Best Independent Production Company
- BANFF Rocky Mountain Award Nominee – Best Children's Fiction Programme, ‘Hank Zipzer’
- Chicago Film Festival TV Awards – Certificate of Merit, 'Hank Zipzer'
- CINE – CINE Golden Eagle Award, 'Hank Zipzer'

2017

- International Emmy Award Children's - Best TV Movie, 'Hank Zipzer'
