= Dustbin Baby (film) =

2008 television film directed by Juliet May

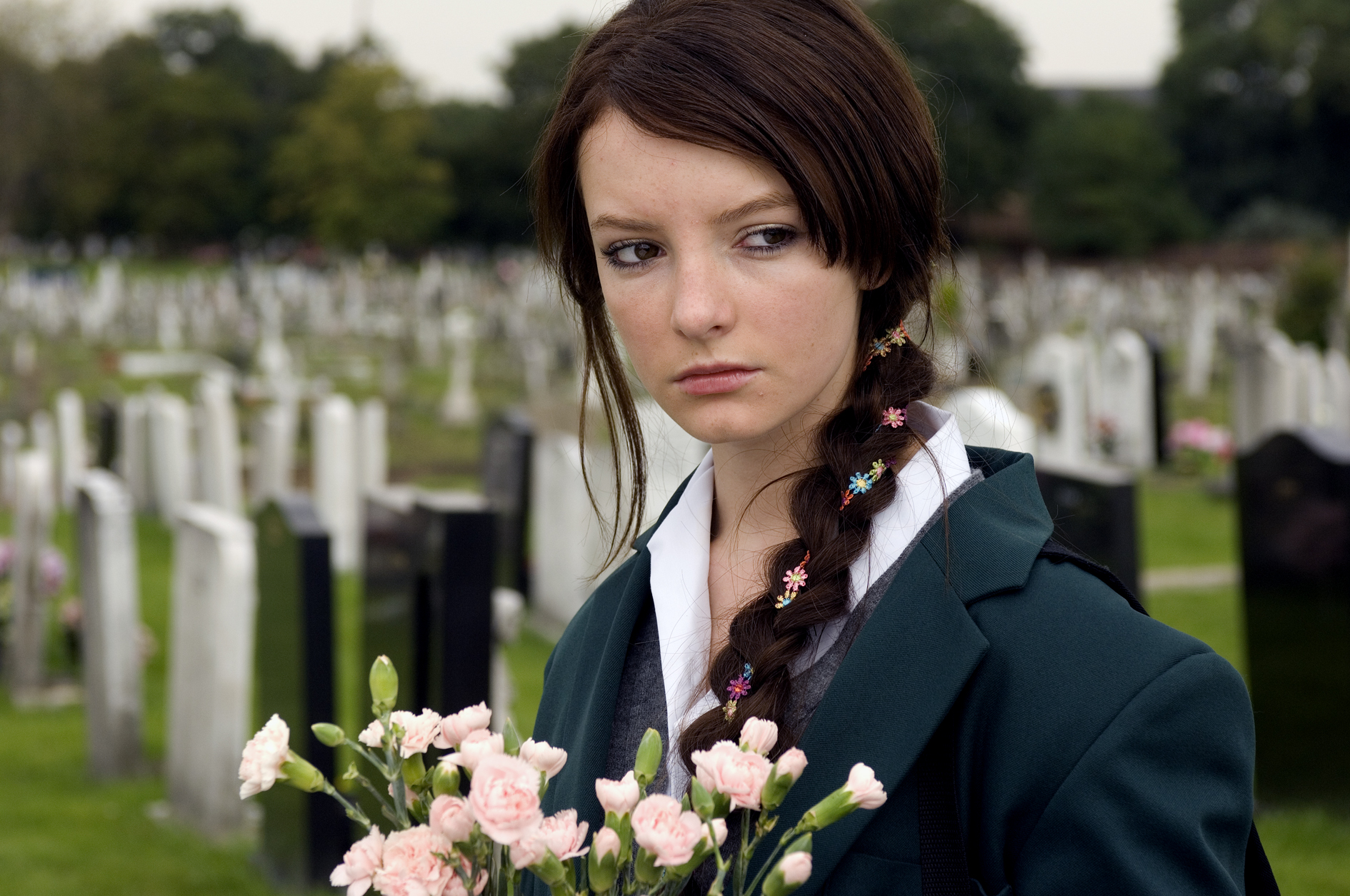
- Dakota Blue Richards as April
- Genre: Drama; Adventure
- Based on: Dustbin Baby by Jacqueline Wilson
- Screenplay by: Helen Blakeman
- Directed by: Juliet May
- Starring: Dakota Blue Richards; Juliet Stevenson; David Haig
- Narrated by: Dakota Blue Richards
- Theme music composer: Adrian Johnston
- Country of origin: United Kingdom
- Original language: English

Production
- Producers: Julia Ouston, Kindle Entertainment
- Cinematography: Chris Goodger
- Editor: Jake Bernard
- Running time: 88 minutes

Original release
- Network: BBC One
- Release: 21 December 2008

Dustbin Baby is a BBC television film directed by Juliet May, based on Jacqueline Wilson's 2001 novel of the same name. It was first broadcast on BBC One on 21 December 2008. The film stars Dakota Blue Richards as April, a troubled teenager who was abandoned in a dustbin as an infant, and Juliet Stevenson as Marion Bean, April's adoptive mother. David Haig stars as Elliot, Marion's friend and colleague. The screenplay was written by Helen Blakeman, and the film was produced by Kindle Entertainment. Dustbin Baby deals with themes including maternal bonding, bullying, and youth crime. The story revolves around April running away on her fourteenth birthday, while Marion searches for her. April's life is recounted in flashbacks as she meets people and visits places that are significant to her.

Both Wilson and critics responded positively to the film, with Wilson saying she thought it was the best film adaptation of any of her works. It was released on DVD on 12 January 2009. Dustbin Baby was awarded the International Emmy in the Children and Young People category at the 2009 ceremony. Helen Blakeman won a Children's BAFTA for the screenplay, while the film itself was shortlisted for a Children's BAFTA in the Drama category and shortlisted for the Kids' Vote award. The film was also awarded the 2010 KidScreen Award for Best One-off, Special, or TV movie aimed at a Family Audience and the KidScreen Award for Best Acting.

== Plot ==
On April's fourteenth birthday, Marion, her adoptive mother, gives her earrings, not the mobile phone she wanted. They argue, and April leaves for school. After lying to her friends, claiming she has a phone and is going to the dentist's, April chooses to be truant. While at work at a stately home, Marion hears that April has not arrived at school. She talks to her friend and colleague Elliot, who unsuccessfully tries to dissuade her from leaving. April visits the home of Pat Williams, who cared for her as a baby. Pat remembers April and gives her a newspaper cutting telling the story of her discovery as a baby in a dustbin behind a pizza parlour.

In a flashback, a five-year-old April is seen living with Janet and Daniel Johnson. The Johnsons' relationship was an abusive one, that lead to Janet's suicide. Meanwhile, Marion goes to April's school, where she talks to April's friends, and realizes that they were lied to. April leaves Pat's home, and travels alone to visit Janet's grave. Marion continues to search, and meets Elliot in a shopping center. April visits the now abandoned Sunnyholme Children's Home, where she lived when she was younger.

In a flashback, an eight-year-old April lives at the Sunnyholme and is cared for by a woman, Mo. April befriends an older girl, Gina, and is introduced to Pearl, a girl her own age. Pearl behaves in front of Mo, but actually bullies April when Mo is not around. Gina wakes April up one night to join in on a burglary, and, later, Pearl attacks April, holding her head under water. Pearl also tears up April's beloved paper dolls. April confronts Pearl, and pushes her down a flight of stairs. She is reprimanded by Mo. A voice-over from 14-year-old April says Gina was then "moved on", and, eventually, April is also moved on.

The flashback jumps forward to April's time at Fairdale Residential School. She befriends Poppy, who has Asperger syndrome. In the present, Marion buys a mobile phone for April. Back at Fairdale, April is being taught by Miss Marion Bean. A Homework project on family trees leads to a fight. At night, April tries to escape the school to find Gina, but is caught by Marion, who sends her back. Marion reads April's records, and when she learns about her history, she apologizes for the family tree incident.

Banned from going out on a Saturday with her peers, April is instead taken to the stately home by Marion. A present-day Marion goes alone to her house, to find that there are no messages on the phone. The younger Marion introduces April to Elliot as they continue to visit the home. The present-day Marion goes to April's room, and looks in April's box, which contains mementos from different times in her life then proceeds to trash the bedroom. The younger April and Marion walk through the home's garden, and Marion tells April she is leaving Fairdale. April becomes angry, thinking that Marion, like others before her, is now going to leave her life. Marion invites April to move in with her, and she accepts. When shown around her new bedroom, April's first concern is to have somewhere to put her box. The present April considers returning to Marion, but realizes there is another place she wants to visit. It occurs to Marion where April will be going, and she drives away from her house.

April goes to the alley where she was found as a baby, and stands among the trash bins. Marion opens April's cell phone and calls Reno's, the pizza parlour. April then notices a phone number on the side of a dustbin, with a message to "Call if Baby". Marion asks for directions to the pizza parlour, while April dials the number she found. It is not her mother who answers, as she hoped, but Frankie, the pizza boy who found her. She meets Frankie in the pizza parlour, and Marion arrives. April explains who Frankie is, and Marion gives April her new phone. The three sit down together. A voice-over from April says that, though she will probably never know her birth mother, she has a mother in Marion, and this is just the beginning.

== Cast ==
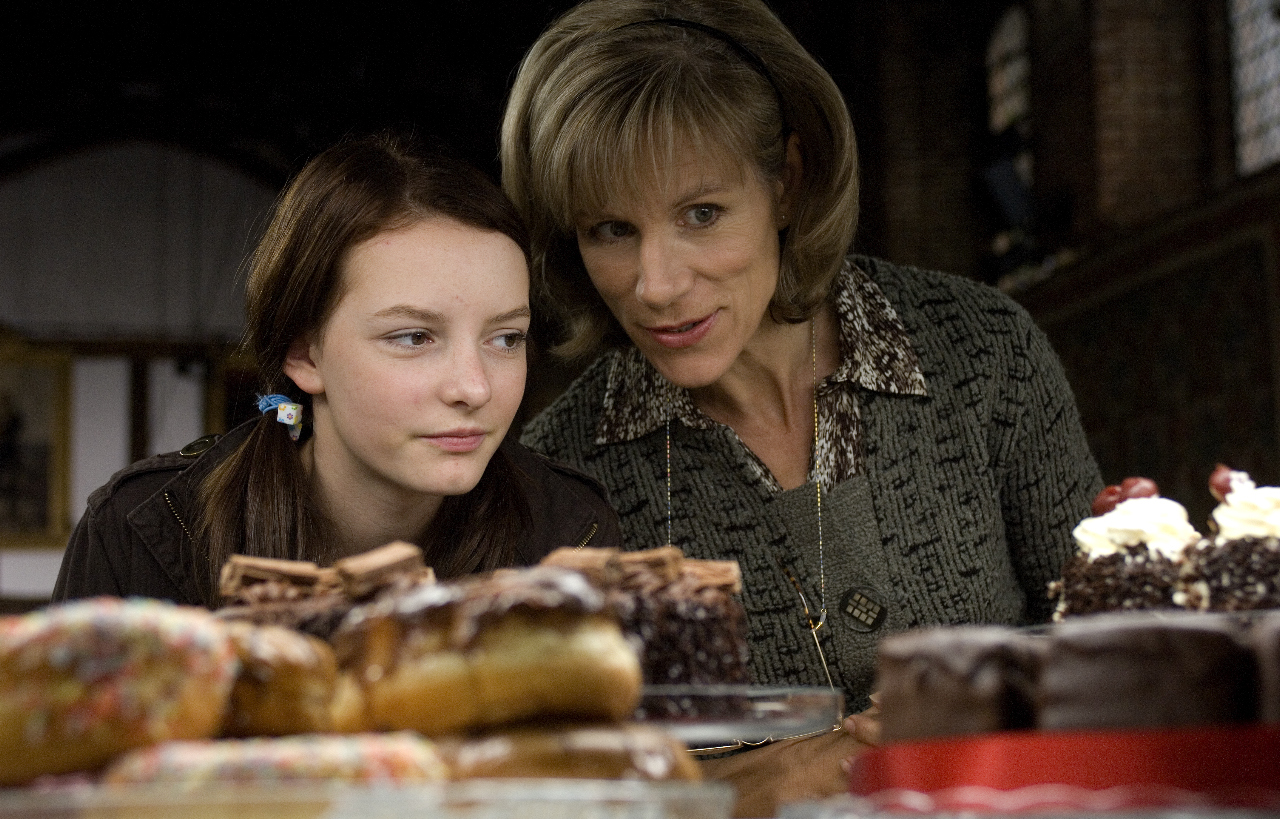
A publicity still from the film showing April (left, played by Dakota Blue Richards) and Marion (played by Juliet Stevenson), in a flashback to when April was still a student at Fairdale.

- Dakota Blue Richards as April Johnson
- Juliet Stevenson as Marion Bean
- David Haig as Elliot
- Poppy Lee Friar as Hannah
- Saffron Coomber as Cathy
- George Bustin as baby April
- Jenna Boyd as Sandra
- Marika McKennell as Tanya
- Di Botcher as Pat Williams
- Lucy Hutchinson as little April
- Ian Kelsey as Daniel Johnson
- Carol Starks as Janet Johnson
- Jane McDowell as Mrs Stevenson
- Simon Roberts as Mr Stevenson
- Joanna Dunn as the policewoman
- Ben McKay as the stranger
- Peter Bramhill as the police officer
- Alexandra Hewett as Young April
- Chris Ryman as Frankie
- Leah Coombes as the hoody girl
- Elijah Baker as the hoody boy
- Nicola Duffett as Big Mo
- Leah Harvey as Gina
- Louis Payne as Robbie
- Sylvia Hodgson as Pearl
- Lizzy Clark as Poppy
- Waleed Akhtar as Asif
- Chizzy Akudolu as the railway woman

== Production ==
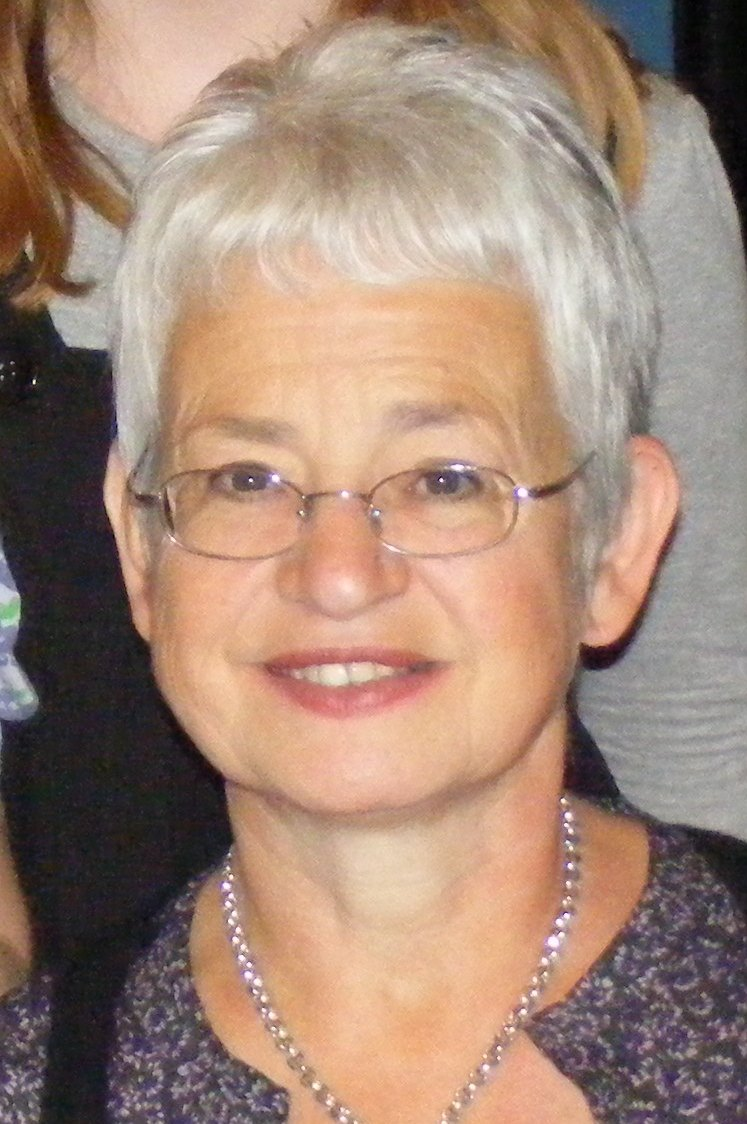
Jacqueline Wilson wrote the novel Dustbin Baby, upon which the film was based.

The film's screenplay was based on Jacqueline Wilson's 2001 novel Dustbin Baby, and was written by Helen Blakeman, who had previously worked on Pleasureland. Dustbin Baby was co-commissioned by CBBC and BBC One, and was produced by Kindle Entertainment, a production company specialising in children's television. According to The Guardian, the film was billed as "a key part of BBC1's Christmas family line-up". Blakeman said that when she had read the novel, she "knew it was something [she] had to write". The film's executive producers were Anne Brogan and Melanie Stokes for Kindle, with Sue Nott as executive producer for CBBC. The producer was Julia Ouston. Director Juliet May, at the time of filming, had 14-year-old twins, and so found "the fact that the lead, April, is 14 years old ... very interesting" as she felt she could "kind of understand 14-year-old children".

Though the "gritty realism" of Wilson's novels was different from Dakota Blue Richards's first role as Lyra Belacqua in The Golden Compass, she was happy to take on the character of April. She said she "can really relate to the characters" in Wilson's novels, but found that April was "a really different person" to her. Wilson, who had previously seen Richards in The Golden Compass, was "over the moon to hear she was going to be in Dustbin Baby. Richards was to play the 14-year-old April, but other actresses were required to play younger versions of the character. Lucy Hutchinson, who was five at the time of filming, played the youngest April. Director Juliet May described her as "one of the most remarkable five year olds I have ever met", saying that "it's like she's not acting at all". Alex Hewett was selected to play the "middle April". May described her as having "utter truth in her acting". Though ten years old, Hewett plays April at eight.

Juliet Stevenson said she was attracted to the part of Marion as "it's very boring playing versions of yourself", and because she did at the time have a 14-year-old daughter. David Haig filmed Dustbin Baby, along with three other television appearances that summer, to earn money to help support his family while he appeared in the play Loot. He described his role as a "snug cameo with a purpose". Dustbin Baby was filmed over summer 2008 in London and the surrounding areas, with scenes at Hatfield House and in Barnet. Before the completion of the filming, Wilson was quoted as saying she was "thrilled at the prospect of Dustbin Baby being brought to life by such a talented cast and production team. I am looking forward to seeing the end result immensely."

The BBC purposefully searched for an actor with Asperger syndrome to play the part of Poppy. Lizzy Clark auditioned for the part after their mother saw an advert on an autism website. Clark was selected to play Poppy, and the role in Dustbin Baby was their first experience of professional acting. Clark was considered the first actress with Asperger syndrome to portray a fictional character with the condition. Clark, who has since campaigned with their mother against characters with conditions such as Asperger syndrome being played by actors without the condition, said "My Asperger's made some things on the film set difficult at first, like dealing with the sudden noise of the storyboard, but I was soon so focused on acting that I didn't notice anything else."

== Themes ==
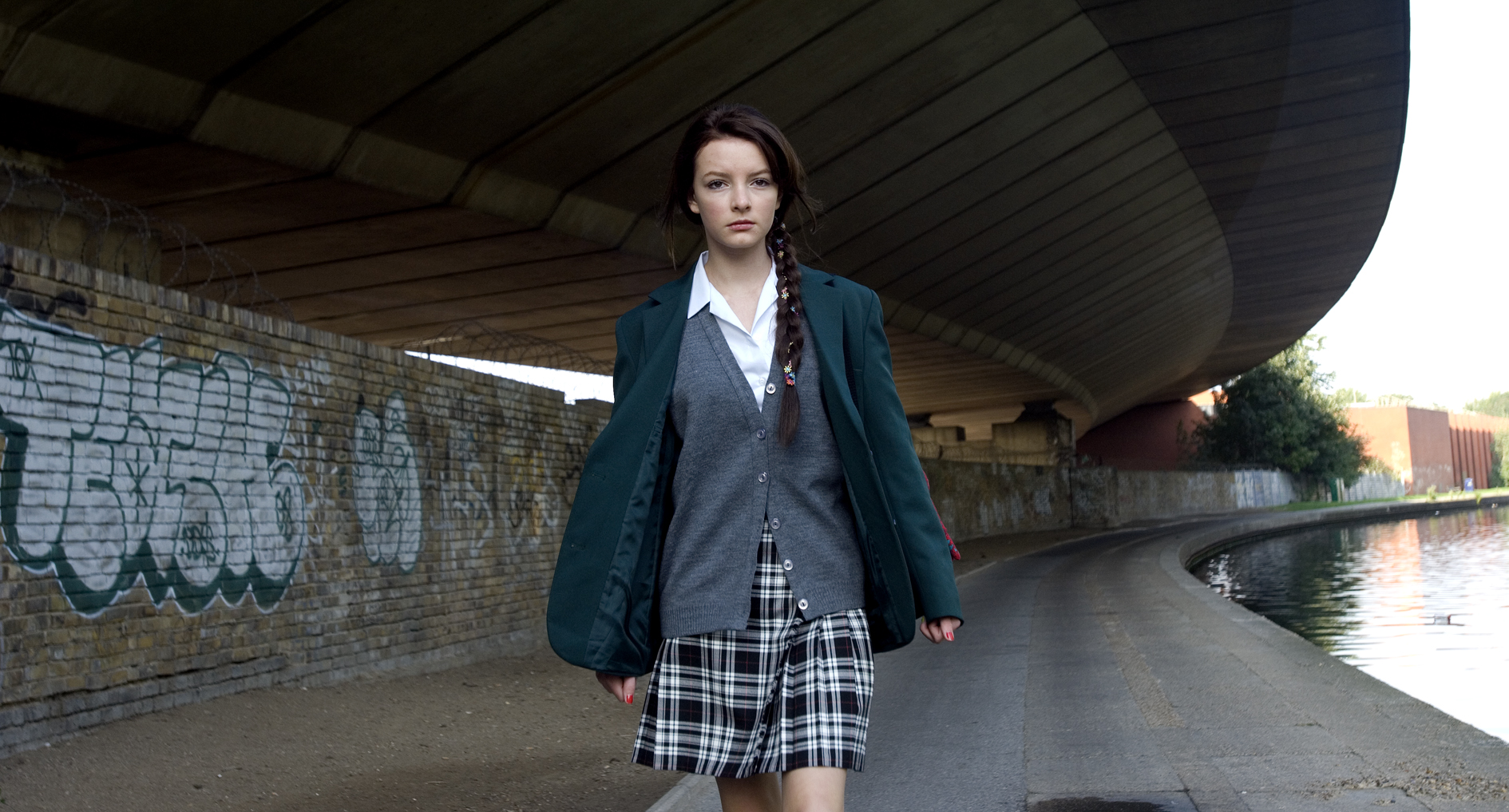
The "present" April on her journey of self-discovery

Blakeman said that she read the book in a single sitting, before "crying her eyes out". The film includes the themes of bullying, youth crime, domestic violence, unwanted pregnancy, and teenage angst. For Blakeman, April's "heartbreaking journey in searching for her real mum is also about being brave enough to let love in." Tom Sutcliffe, writing for The Independent, spoke of the limits of taboo themes in family dramas, and said the film's "account of a life lived in care couldn't have had swearing, or casual drug use, and when a shadow fell over a child's bed at night, it wasn't the care-home manager coming to exercise some horrible droit de seigneur [sic], as it might have been in an adult drama". The film also addressed the theme of Asperger syndrome through the character of Poppy. The BBC claimed that Clark, who has the condition herself, was able to offer "a unique take" on the role. Steveson summarised the themes of the film, saying that "At the centre of the story, Marion finds out that she loves this girl. And that is an amazing liberation when you discover someone more important to you than you are. That is what is incredible about becoming a parent – you care about your child more than you care about yourself."

On Behind the Bin, a making-of documentary about Dustbin Baby, Wilson said that "lots and lots of people will identify with" the central theme of adoption, as at fourteen "you start to look at your mum and dad and think 'I'm nothing like them', and everyone seems to have fantasies about that they were adopted or something, and so I think that it's a typical teenage thing that you question who you are". Richards says that she likes the idea that April "went on a journey to try and find herself" as "a lot of people [her age] try and do that because a lot of people get to the point where they're not really sure who they are any more". Richards also discusses the motif of April's paper dolls, saying that April can relate to them as in different places, she is "still the same person", but that she is "coloured in differently by different people and different surroundings". Alexandra Hewett, who played the Young April, described the dolls as April's "only real friends".

Stevenson described the character of Marion as "cranky, stubborn and lonely", saying that living alone has made her "become quite idiotic and eccentric". When the character of April arrives, Stevenson explains that "Marion has to go from nought to 80 in terms of parenting. There are lots of reasons she wouldn't get it right" which leads on to the guilt and anxiety that Marion suffers when April runs away. Stevenson compared her own difficulties of parenting to Marion's, saying "it is easier for me than someone like Marion because I have had 14 years experience". Richards spoke of the character of April, saying that "the residential schools and children's homes were completely different from my life. [April] doesn't feel connected to anybody and she struggles to know who she is".

== Reception ==
Wilson, after seeing an early screening of Dustbin Baby, said that it was the best film adaptation of any of her works. Haig said that the film was his favourite of his summer projects, saying "it was a terrific story and very touchingly done. I think Juliet Stevenson was very funny and moving in it". During its initial run on BBC One, Dustbin Baby was watched by 2.3 million viewers, giving it a 15.4% share of the audience.

=== Critical reception ===
Critics responded positively to the film. In an article in The Times David Chater awarded the programme the TV choice of the day, describing it as "tremendous", and "the wonderful surprise of Christmas". The film was described in The Telegraph as a "rare treat", as it is "something that teenagers and parents can watch together". This view was shared by producer Anne Brogan, who said that the film was something "that parents and children will enjoy watching while giving them much to talk about". Tom Sutcliffe, writing for The Independent, said Stevenson was "good as a woman who was far more comfortable in the past than the present", and that "her performance was more than matched by that of Dakota Blue Richards as April, mostly banked-down and wary but prone to sudden wild flashes of anger". He criticised some of the "implausibilities", saying that the plot was, at times, "a lot kinder than the world might have been", but said that "it still made you well up with its final reconciliation" with emotion that had been "honestly earned". Euan Ferguson, in an article in The Guardian, said that the film "hooked and haunted", and added that Stevenson played Marion like "a kind of updated" Jean Brodie.

=== Accolades ===
In 2009, Dustbin Baby was one of four works of children's television shortlisted for the International Emmy Award in the children and young people category at the 37th International Emmy Awards. The other nominations were Lharn Poo Koo E-Joo (produced by Workpoint Entertainment), The Little Emperor's Christmas (produced by Rede Globo), and Mille (produced by the Danish Broadcasting Corporation). The film was one of nine nominations for the UK, which had more than any other nation. The film won the award, making it one of six International Emmys for the UK, and one of three for the BBC, in 2009. Dustbin Baby was also shortlisted for the British Academy Children's Awards in the drama category, along with The Sarah Jane Adventures (also by the BBC), S4C's Rhestr Nadolig Wil, and the online show following boyband US5. The ceremony was held on 29 November at The London Hilton on Park Lane and hosted by Dick and Dom. Dustbin Baby lost out to Rhestr Nadolig Wil. Blakeman was shortlisted for the British Academy Children's Award for best writer, thanks to her screenplay for Dustbin Baby, and won. The film was also entered into the BAFTA Kids' Vote in the television category. Children aged between seven and fourteen were able to vote for their favourite television show from a choice also featuring Blue Peter, Dani's House, Newsround, Prank Patrol, The Sarah Jane Adventures, Hannah Montana, Phineas and Ferb, iCarly, and SpongeBob SquarePants. The Kids' Vote was won by Hannah Montana.

In February 2010, Dustbin Baby was awarded the 2010 KidScreen Award for best one-off, special, or TV movie aimed at a family audience. The film also won the Creative Talent award for best acting. These were two of five prizes won by CBBC at the inaugural KidScreen Awards, and Joe Godwin, the BBC Children's director, said "I'm truly delighted that CBBC programmes are being recognised globally for being original and inspiring to children everywhere ... It's especially satisfying to win awards for really distinctive and hard-hitting factual and drama, which has always been, and always will be, a unique and central part of what BBC Children's does."

== Home media release ==
Dustbin Baby was released on DVD in January 2009 by ITV DVD. It was rated PG by the British Board of Film Classification, due to "mild threat, violence and one sex reference", and was marketed with the tagline "April is about to lift the lid on her past". The DVD included a 24-minute making-of feature, "Behind the Bin: The Making of Dustbin Baby", containing interviews with Jacqueline Wilson and production staff and cast.
