= Brigitte Millar =

English actress

- Occupation: Actress
- Years active: 2005–present
- Known for: Harry Potter and the Order of the Phoenix; Spectre

Brigitte Millar is an English actress. She is mostly known for playing alongside Daniel Craig and Christoph Waltz in Spectre.

== Career ==
In 2011, Millar was awarded Best Supporting Actress for her role in the British feature film David is Dying.

In 2014, Millar was one of the supporting roles of The Quiet Hour with Dakota Blue Richards, which was nominated for Best UK Feature at the 22nd Raindance Film Festival. Millar portrayed SPECTRE's Dr. Vogel alongside Daniel Craig and Christoph Waltz in Spectre the following year.

In 2018, Millar played alongside Matt Passmore in the short film Nox directed by Keyvan Sheikhalishahi.

== Filmography ==
=== Films ===
Year	Title	Role	Notes
2005	Charlie and the Chocolate Factory	Journalist	
2007	Harry Potter and the Order of the Phoenix	Emmeline Vance	
2010	The Wolfman	Gertrude	
2011	David is Dying	Amelia Holland	
2014	Walking with the Ferryman	Michelle	
2014	The Quiet Hour	Kathryn	
2015	Run Away with Me	Rebecca	
2015	Spectre	Vogel	
2018	Nox	Claire Winters	Short Film
2021	No Time to Die	Vogel	

=== Television ===
Year	Title	Role	Notes
2009	Desperate Romantics	Mrs. Tozer	1 episode
