= Modern Toss =

British comic by Jon Link and Mick Bunnage

- The stink of excellence in a world gone tits up!
- Author(s): Jon Link; Mick Bunnage
- Website: moderntoss.com
- Launch date: 2004
- Genre: Comedy

Modern Toss is a British comic by Jon Link and Mick Bunnage. Renowned for their scurrilous humour and highly stylised animation, it was created in 2004, initially as a website publishing single panel jokes, regular features in magazines, and then as a series of irregularly released comic books. To date there have been ten issues. The first four comics were republished as two books by Macmillan and two TV series were produced for Channel 4 and distributed worldwide by Fremantle Media.

Prior to starting Modern Toss, Link and Bunnage were on the original launch team for Loaded magazine, where they developed their first joint cartoon strip, Office Pest.

== Comics and books ==
Since 2004, ten issues of Modern Toss have been published as comics, plus one Christmas Special in 2007. The early editions of the comics were part funded by advance subscriptions of enthusiasts who discovered Modern Toss cartoons on the web and eventually became the 'Friends of Modern Toss' – always credited on the final page of each of the comics.

The first two issues of the comic were compiled into a book, published by Macmillan in 2004 and Simon & Schuster in the US (2006). Modern Toss: Another Book was compiled from comic issues three and four and was also published by Macmillan in 2007. Macmillan went on to publish three further books: The Modern Toss Guide to Work (2007), Modern Toss Christmas Special (2008), and Home-Clubber – 'All You Can Eat' (2009).

Alongside publishing the comics, Modern Toss have self-published three books: Collected Thoughts by Drive-By Abuser (2009) a hand-stitched collection of comic verse from their character famed for his half-baked musings, More Work (2010) a compilation of the Work cartoons produced subsequent to the release of The Modern Toss Guide to Work, and Desperate Business (2012).

In 2013, a souvenir book version of the F**KYEUX Tapestry was published. An historic cartoon snapshot that was created in six hours on 28 April 2013 at Pick Me Up in Somerset House, London by Modern Toss and some people who turned up on the day. It was scribed onto one continuous roll of paper and measures 103 metres.

Modern Toss has appeared regularly in The Guardian since 2011 and Private Eye.

== Television ==
Modern Toss
- Genre: Comedy
- Created by: Jon Link; Mick Bunnage
- Starring: Lee Kern; Simon Roberts; Fiona Terry; Christopher Rowe; Camilla Corbett; Yvonne Tansley
- Voices of: Lee Kern; Ralph Brown; Mackenzie Crook; Anthony Davis; Simon Greenall; Paul Kaye; Doon Mackichan; David Schaal; Lucy Scott
- Theme music composer: Dominic Nunns
- Country of origin: United Kingdom
- Original language: English
- No. of series: 2
- No. of episodes: 13 (including pilot episode)

Production
- Executive producers: Alan Marke; Jim Reid for Channel X Pilot and Series 1. David Cuff for Modern Toss Productions
- Producer: Jane Harrison
- Running time: 24 min. approx

Original release
- Network: Channel 4
- Release: May 2005
- Release: 11 July 2006 – 27 February 2008

Channel 4 commissioned Modern Toss to produce a half-hour Comedy Lab entitled Modern Toss. A live action and animation treatment which was first broadcast in May 2005 and most recently repeated in Channel 4’s Funny Fortnight in August 2012. A co-production between Modern Toss Productions and Channel X, the 30 minute show was written by Jon Link and Mick Bunnage. Live action was directed by Joe Cornish and animation by Jon Link and Mick Bunnage. The director of photography was Ben Wheatley.

Channel 4 subsequently commissioned two six part series, the first which was broadcast from 11 July 2006 and the second from 23 January 2008. It includes live action, animation, and cartoons combining the two. The show has a voice cast that includes Mackenzie Crook, Doon Mackichan, Paul Kaye, Ralph Brown and Simon Greenall. The live-action sketches ("I live 'ere", "Alan", "Drive by abuser", "Customer services", "Accident and emergency", "Citizens advice", "Illegal alphabet") were directed by Ben Wheatley. The animation was designed and directed by Bunnage and Link. Series one animation was produced by 12Foot6 and series two by Spy Pictures and Le Singe Media of Brighton, UK.

Alongside Channel 4, on 4 May 2007, the show aired on pay TV channel Bravo in the UK as part of the Adult Swim block. Between 2008 and 2010, Series 2 aired on the pay TV channel Paramount Comedy Channel (subsequently rebranded as Comedy Central). In 2010–11, the show aired on 4 Music. The first series was released on Region 2 DVD in November 2007, while a second series started on Channel 4 on 23 January 2008. The TV series won unanimous critical praise and were nominated for a Rose d'Or award in 2009. The two series were distributed worldwide and broadcast in 30-plus territories including the US.

Following the TV series, Modern Toss produced an animated sitcom Work Experience which was broadcast on E4 in 2008. In 2009, BBC commissioned Chaos Laboratories, a live action, sci-fi themed animation series (with Paul Kaye and Simon Day).

Channel 4 then commissioned Modern Toss to produce the Business Mouse cartoon series for their Comedy Blaps series and ended up broadcasting them on Channel 4 in August 2012. Business Mouse picked up a Royal Television Society Award. Modern Toss also produced Robin of Essex for Channel 4, which debuted in 2012 online.

In August 2012, Channel 4 commissioned Modern Toss to produce a series of five promos for their Funny Fortnight.

== Recurring cartoons ==
Though some of them are one-off, most of the cartoons follow recurring themes (or in a few cases loosely sequential stories). The following all appear in the publications and many also in the television series:

- Mr Tourette: a French sign-writer who produces offensive signs bearing no relation to his customers' instructions. This usually culminates in his customer being totally unhappy with the work and Mr Tourette calling them "some kind of cunt"
- Alan: a sociopathic, scribble-like creature who plays extreme practical jokes on his middle-class brother-in-law, usually involving Alan turning up uninvited to a social event and causing a large amount of destruction, to the tune of "I Like To Move It" by Reel 2 Real, before running away, leaving his brother-in-law to shout "Come back, Alan, you wanker!"
- Prince Edward, Royal Entrepreneur: the prince tries to make money out of anything associated with the royal family, no matter how tasteless
- Cheese and Wine: satire of boring 'small talk' made at parties, such as 'I hear Peter's new business is in trouble' meeting with the reply 'Peter's a cunt'
- Citizens' Advice: irate and often illogical complaints from members of the public about goods, services and employers, usually concluding with the question "where do I stand legally?"
- Work: conversations with disgruntled or complacent employees; for example, a man phones in from home, saying, "I've heard the printer's broken so I won't be coming in"
- 999: emergency phone calls from people in bizarre situations
- Emergency services: people with bizarre health complaints
- Daytrippers: two men discuss plans for various violent outings
- Planet chat: everyday conversations between celestial bodies
- Space argument: astronauts arguing on the moon
- I live 'ere: a farmer who recounts his violent assaults on members of the public
- Drive-by abuser: a man on a moped who shouts pointless insults at people, animals or inanimate objects he drives past. Typical examples include:
  - "You're a traffic light, yeh? Changing colours, yeh? Yeh, fucking looks like it an' all"
  - "Well good luck to ya, 'cause I wouldn't have the fucking nerve"
  - "Why not, though, eh? It's your life, innit?"
  - "See ya around, yeah?"
- Fly talk: conversations between flies about humans they have encountered, sometimes mentioning celebrities including Chris Martin and 50 Cent.
- Home clubber: provides a panel of insight into the latest exploit of an amoral entrepreneur. These cartoons appear weekly in the "Guide" section of The Guardian
- Weekend: tedious domestic conversations
- Medieval Kneval: exploits of a medieval stuntman
- Peanut: the saga of a disbanded pop group and their manager
- Park: dog excrement related events in a park
- Dogkiller: novel methods of luring dogs to their death
- And what do you think?: vox pop interviews
- Customer Services: Customers returning purchased items to shops with absurd complaints about the item's quality, i.e.: "This CD I bought off you, made me kill someone!" Or: "This kitchen I bought off you, gave me manic depression!"

The following recurring cartoons are in the television version only:

- Gnat burglar: a giant gnat which sucks the entire contents out of things and injects it into other things
- Underground wolf gobbler: a giant semi-human monster that pops up out of the ground and eats things, bears a passing resemblance to Rupert Murdoch (Actually editor Rob Hill's father Bob)
- Peace & quiet: a man who seeks peace and quiet in his garden, but is plagued by noise from neighbours and others nearby
- Barney: a man who periodically turns into a red Incredible Hulk-like monster at the mention of Alan Titchmarsh and during everyday minor frustrations, and causes destruction in a mad rage, followed by embarrassment at what he has done
- Illegal Alphabet: a large number of human-sized letters that congregate in a field to form rude words (including bizarre portmanteaus such as "pipecock"); they are then ambushed by police. These scenes end with a BBC Radio 4-style voiceover announcing e.g. "That was Illegal Alphabet in 'unsanctioned piss meeting' followed by 'unauthorised shitcasket'"
- Sneezeman: a little man with a huge nose who is propelled backwards at great speed when he sneezes, usually hurting himself and destroying property
- Seawalker: this has only appeared once so far in the television series — a man with very long legs walks out of the sea onto the beach, whereupon his legs are severed by people playing frisbee

== The Periodic Table of Swearing ==
A creation inspired by the Periodic Table, The Periodic Table of Swearing design was featured in the 2011 book Information Graphics, which documents the history of classic presentation of information through design. Eulogised in Eye magazine the Periodic Table of Swearing was produced as an actual interactive table as an installation at the Latitude Festival in 2011.

== Commissioned works ==
Bunnage and Link partnered with shoe company Kickers in 2009 to present Random Bandits, a suite of cartoons in the style of other Modern Toss productions. They have developed three strands of film theme which appear as short skits in each of the episodes that make up the Kickers presents Random Bandits series. The films feature voiceovers by comedy actor Mackenzie Crook.

In 2011, Modern Toss were commissioned by Brighton and Hove Albion to produce artwork for their new stadium, the Falmer Stadium, in the West Stand of the ground.

== Exhibitions ==
A 10th Anniversary exhibition was held in 2024 in London.

A 21st Anniversary exhibition toured Brighton, Liverpool and Sheffield in 2025.

== Merchandise ==
There is a wide variety of Modern Toss merchandise, including t-shirts, soft toys, DVDs, books, comics, magnets, cards, and posters. Online games and apps have also been developed for various platforms.

In June 2018, Modern Toss launched two beers ("Horse Piss" and "Ditch Scooper"), brewed by Goldmark Craft Beers of Arundel.
