= Brian Percival =

Film director, television director

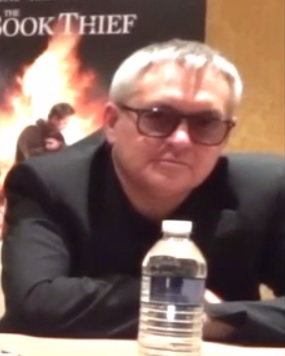
Brian Percival interviewed about The Book Thief in 2013

Brian Percival (born 1962) is a British film director, known for his work on the British television series Downton Abbey and North & South, as well as the feature film The Book Thief.

== Biography ==
He was born in Liverpool, England, in 1962 and attended New Heys Comprehensive School from 1973 to 1980. From film school, he began working in music videos and fashion clips around Europe. In the 1990s he began a career as a TV commercials director working in London, Paris and Copenhagen. After winning his first BAFTA for Best Short Film in 2001 he went on to direct drama for television. He directed Clocking Off for the BBC, Pleasureland, North and South, ShakespeaRe-Told (Much Ado About Nothing), (for which he won his second Bafta), The Ruby in the Smoke and The Old Curiosity Shop.

His nine-minute short About a Girl won the BAFTA Award for Best Short Film and several film festival awards in 2001.

Since 2010 he has directed seven episodes of the ITV British period drama, Downton Abbey. For his work on the show he won the 2010 BAFTA Craft award for Best Fiction Director and the 2011 Primetime Emmy Award for Outstanding Directing for a Miniseries, Movie or a Dramatic Special. In 2012, he was nominated for a Primetime Emmy Award for Outstanding Directing for a Drama Series for "Episode 7". He also directed the 2013 film, The Book Thief.

== Filmography ==
Film

- A Boy Called Dad (2009)
- The Book Thief (2013)

TV movies

- Pleasureland (2003)
- The Old Curiosity Shop (2007)
- Gracie! (2009)
- A Song for Jenny (2015)

TV series

Year	Title	Director	Producer
2004	North & South	Yes	No
2010–2012	Downton Abbey	Yes	Yes
2016	Dark Angel	Yes	No
2020–2021	All Creatures Great and Small	Yes	Yes
