= The Quiet Hour =

- Film poster
- Directed by: Stéphanie Joalland
- Written by: Stéphanie Joalland
- Produced by: Sean Anthony McConvill
- Starring: Dakota Blue Richards; Karl Davies; Jack McMullen; Brigitte Millar; Zeb Moore
- Release date: 3 October 2014
- Country: United Kingdom

The Quiet Hour is a 2014 British science fiction film written and directed by Stéphanie Joalland and produced by Sean Anthony McConville. It stars Dakota Blue Richards, Karl Davies, Jack McMullen, and Brigitte Millar.

== Plot ==
Humans are few and far between since Earth was invaded by unseen extraterrestrial machines that harvest the planet's natural resources and relentlessly kill its inhabitants. In a remote part of the countryside, where starved humans have become as dangerous as the alien machines hovering in the sky, a feisty 19-year-old woman, Sarah Connolly, sets out on a desperate attempt to fight back against a group of bandits and defend her parents' farm, their remaining livestock, and the solar panels that keep them safe from extraterrestrials. If she doesn't succeed, she will lose her only source of food and shelter; but if she resists, she and her blind brother will be killed. And if the mysterious intruder dressed like a soldier who claims he can help them turns out to be a liar, then the enemy may already be in the house.

== Cast ==
- Dakota Blue Richards as Sarah
- Karl Davies as Jude
- Jack McMullen as Tom Connelly
- Brigitte Millar as Kathryn
- Zeb Moore as Brian

== Production ==
The film was shot in County Tipperary in Ireland and made its world premiere in July 2014 at the 26th Galway Film Fleadh. It was nominated for Best UK Feature at the 22nd Raindance Film Festival, where it made its UK premiere on 3 October 2014.

The film was produced by Frenzy Films and distributed by Vision Films.

== Reception ==
At Blueprint Review, Katy Vans wrote:

There is a very English bleakness about the film’s atmosphere and the leads are quiet and non-hysterical, stoical; just how you might expect most of the UK to act were we to get invaded by aliens.

At Cryptic Rock, Samantha Andujar gave the film 4 out of 5 stars, writing:

[While] the film is a great, original, and engaging approach to the Post-Apocalyptic film genre, it seems to focus more on character and dialogue than the actual story... The pace is overall very slow for the entire film, but the well-developed protagonist makes it a worth-watching experience... it will be exciting to see more from this exciting director.
