= Dave Anderson (cartoon writer) =

British writer

Dave Anderson (born 1963 in Coventry) is a British writer and creator of cartoons and animations including Bastard Bunny and the BAFTA nominated animation shorts, The Terribles. He is a co-founder of animation studio Dog and Rabbit and was a founder-director of London-based animation production company 12Foot6, whose credits include animating the first series of Modern Toss for UK TV's Channel 4.

== Early life and Bastard Bunny era ==
Anderson graduated from Durham University in 1985 with a degree in Law and Politics. He lived briefly in Charlotte, North Carolina where he shared a house with Danna Pentes, bass player in the then up-and-coming band Fetchin Bones. Returning to the UK he worked in advertising while making ventures into cartoon writing. In 1990 Bastard Bunny appeared in his own comic. Described as "the coolest, drug-snorting, violent, club-going, psychotic rabbit in the world", Bastard Bunny became a cult icon of the early 1990s London club scene. Bastard Bunny's stylishly simple initial incarnation was drawn by Jiouxliegh Jacobs but by 1992, Anderson's new collaborator Martyn Smith had given the weed-loving GBH-rabbit a more fearsome visual persona. It was the latter incarnation which became an ever more common sight on T-shirts and 'lop ear hats' at the Sabresonic Club. At this time, Bastard Bunny "became aligned" with Andy Weatherall's Sabres of Paradise label. Bastard Bunny later appeared in Deadline magazine (along with Tank Girl co-created by Gorillaz artist Jamie Hewlett) and, from 1994, in the New Musical Express. The collected Bastard Bunny collection was published by Virgin Books in 1998 as Don't You Know Who I am?! – The Collected Works. Bastard Bunny reappeared in 2013 after some "enforced gardening leave" in a new, heavyweight on-line persona using the strap-line "He's Fat, He's Forty and He Ain't Happy".

== 12Foot6 ==
For much of the 1990s Anderson contributed to Future Shocks. In 2000, with Tom Mortimer, he co-founded 12Foot6 which has since been the creative crucible for many successful cartoon and animation projects. These include Andrew Kelleher's Dog Judo which originated as an advertising campaign for Virgin Mobile, The Sensibles and a series of wordless animated shorts that were nominated for a BAFTA award in 2007. He also been involved in creating short animated histories as part of the BBC Two programme Dara Ó Briain's Science Club, which includes a sequence in Episode 1 called The Story of Inheritance, one in Episode 2 called The Story of Physics, one in Episode 3 called A Dodo's Guide to Extinction, one in Episode 4 called The Story of Exploration, one in Episode 5 called The Story of the Brain and one in Episode 6 called The Story of Music.

== Dog & Rabbit ==
In 2014, Anderson and Dog Judo creative Andrew Kelleher parted ways with 12foot6 and set up animation studio Dog & Rabbit. Bastard Bunny joined the new set up and was rewarded by becoming the figurehead of several craft beers by MoogBrew.
