= Dustbin Baby =

2001 novel by Jacqueline Wilson

- Author: Jacqueline Wilson
- Cover artist: Nick Sharratt
- Language: English
- Genre: Adopted Children - Juvenile Fiction; Mothers and Daughters - Juvenile Fiction; Children's Stories
- Publisher: Doubleday Children's Books
- Publication date: 1 October 2001
- Publication place: United Kingdom
- Media type: Print
- Pages: 144
- ISBN: 0-385-60042-9
- Dewey Decimal: 823.914
- Preceded by: Sleepovers
- Followed by: How to Survive Summer Camp

Dustbin Baby is a 2001 children's novel by Jacqueline Wilson. It focuses on April, a fourteen-year-old girl who was abandoned by her mother in a dustbin when she was only a few minutes old. After a blazing row with her foster mother, she goes in search of her past. The book was adapted into a television film in 2008 by the BBC.

== Plot summary ==
When she was a few minutes old, April was abandoned by her mother in a dustbin behind a local pizza restaurant. She was discovered by a young waiter there and named "April" by the hospital as she was found on April Fool's Day. She was fostered by Patricia Williams, but only lived with her a short time before being adopted. April's first stop on her fourteenth birthday is Pat's house. She finds that she remembers little of it and Pat remembers little of her. However she does befriend one of Patricia's new foster children - Tanya - a character seen before along with Pat in another of Jacqueline Wilson's books: Bad Girls.

April then visits the graveside of her adoptive mother: Janet Johnson. Janet committed suicide a few years after adopting April, while battling depression stemming from her husband's affairs and the break-up of her marriage.

April subsequently tells readers of the time she was bullied mercilessly in a foster home run by "Big Mo" and "Little Pete" by another resident, Pearl, until April took drastic action against the bullying by pushing Pearl down the stairs, causing Pearl grievous bodily injury and, consequently, April's removal from the home.

She was then sent to a residential care home called "Sunnybank Children's Home". Here, April is befriended by a much older girl called Gina. But, sooner or later, Gina calls upon April to "help" her friends in a series of burglaries after dark. When April later comes across Sunnybank, it redirects her to Gina, who is mother to a young son called Benjamin and does conferences there to steer the children to behave themselves.

After leaving Sunnybank April was taken to Fairleigh, a residential school for problem girls. Here April stayed for five years and formed a close bond with her history teacher Miss Marion Bean. After discovering April's sad life in her file Marion begins to bond with April and refers her to be moved to a mainstream school. Here April makes new friends - Hannah and Cathy - and Marion, with the help of social worker Elaine (which could be a reference to Tracy Beaker's social worker), decides to foster her.

The story ends with April finding and meeting the pizza boy, Frankie, who discovered her in the dustbin the day she was born, and resolving the fight she had with Marion at the start of the story.

== Television adaptation ==
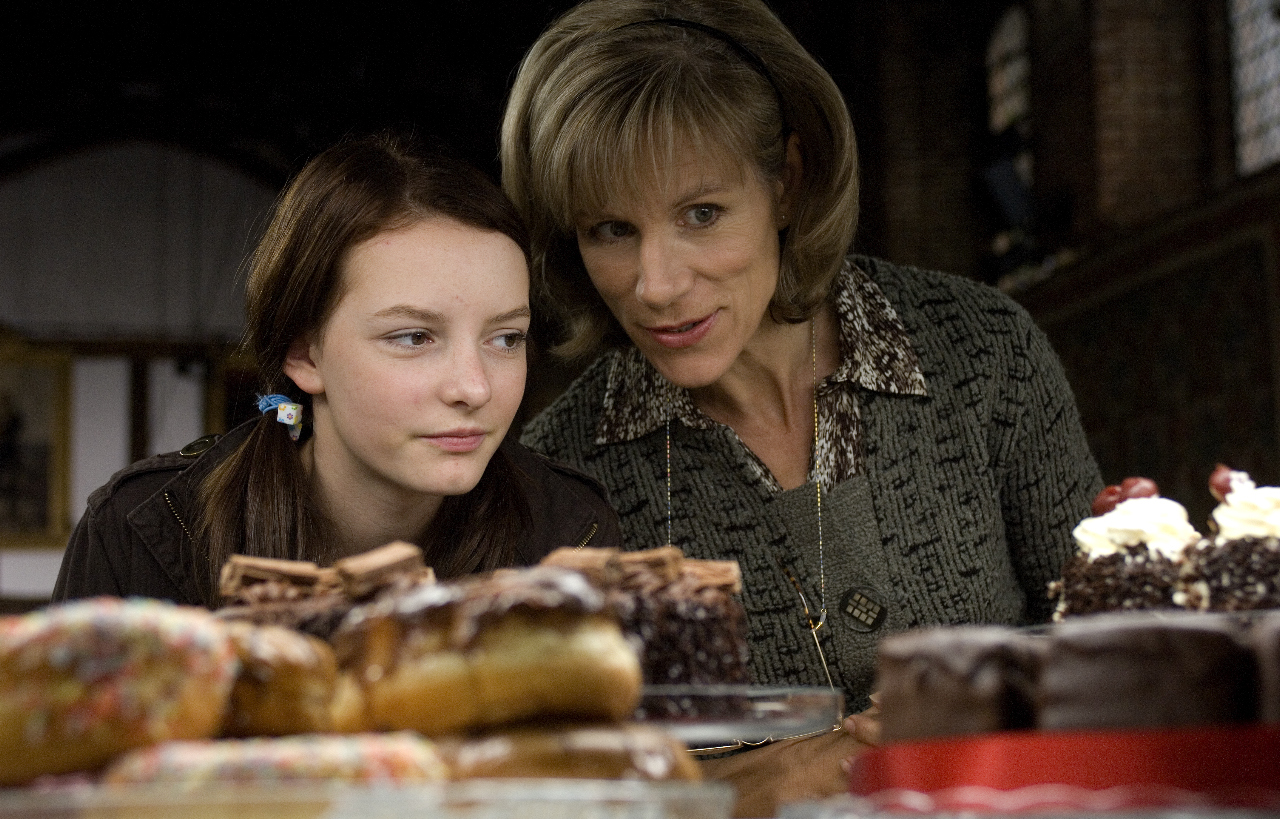
Publicity still from Dustbin Baby showing April (Dakota Blue Richards) and Marion (Juliet Stevenson).

Dustbin Baby was dramatised by the BBC and Kindle Entertainment in 2008. It was directed by Juliet May and the screenplay was written by Helen Blakeman. Juliet Stevenson stars as Marion and Dakota Blue Richards as April. It was aired on BBC1 on Sunday 21 December 2008 at 3:25 pm until 4:55 pm. During its initial run on BBC One, Dustbin Baby was watched by 2.3 million viewers, giving it a 15.4% share of the audience.

Both Wilson and critics responded positively to the film, with Wilson saying she thought it was the best film adaptation of any of her works. It was released on DVD on 12 January 2009. The film was nominated for several awards and even secured many of them.

== Reception ==
The novel was named as one of the bestsellers of the Children's books sections in November 2002, complied by the Booksellers Association of Ireland.
