= Ben-Ryan Davies =

British actor (born 1988)

Ben Davies
- Born: 30 December 1988 (age 37); Rochdale, England
- Occupation: Actor
- Years active: 2006–present
- Known for: Waterloo Road (2010–2012); Hollyoaks (2016–2017); Casualty (2018)

Ben-Ryan Davies (born 30 December 1988) is an English actor who played Ronan Burley in Waterloo Road, Ryan in From There to Here and Nick Savage in Hollyoaks.

== Career ==
He appeared in the CBBC show Jinx from October 2009 to January 2010. From September 2010, Davies appeared in Waterloo Road playing character Ronan Burley. His last episode was in 2012 in series 7, episode 20, and a guest appearance in episode 30. In 2014, he appeared in CBBC's Harriet's Army set during World War I where he plays Edward Grange, the elder brother of Harriet. He played the role of Michael Parry in the 2015 TV mini series, Black Work. In 2016, Davies joined the regular cast of Hollyoaks as Nick Savage. In 2017, he was nominated for a British Soap Award for that role. He left the show in June 2017 when his character was sentenced to prison.

Davies played the role of Prince Charming in Billingham Forum Theatre's 2017–2018 production of Cinderella. In December 2018, he appeared in the Christmas episode of Casualty in the guest role of Laurie Gibbes. He played the role of Peter Pan in the 2018/19 run of the pantomime at Billingham Forum.

In 2023, Davies ran the London Marathon for Springhill Hospice.

== Filmography ==
Year	Title	Role	Notes
2007-2013	Doctors	Various Roles	3 Episodes
2009	Jinx	Chip	Series Regular
2010-2012	Holby City	Dylan Brenton	2 Episodes
2010–2012	Waterloo Road	Ronan Burley	TV Series, 36 episodes
2013	Dani's Castle	Luke	1 Episode
2013	The White Queen	John The Stable Lad	Episode: “War at First Hand”
2013	Moving On	Pads	Episode: “Hush Little Baby”
2014	From There to Here	Ryan	TV Mini-Series, 3 episodes
2014	1946	Sebastian	(short)
2014	Harriet's Army	Edward Grange	3 episodes
2015	Black Work	Michael Parry	2 Episodes
2015	Vera	Harris	Episode: “Tuesday’s Child”
2016–2017	Hollyoaks	Nick Savage	51 episodes
2018	Casualty	Laurie Gibbes	Episode 33.17
2019	Father Brown	Daniel Winks	S7E10: “The Honourable Thief”
