= Helen Blakeman =

British playwright and screenwriter

- Born: 1971 (age 54–55); Liverpool, England
- Occupations: Playwright, screenwriter
- Writing career
- Language: English
- Genre: Drama

Helen Blakeman (born 1971) is a British playwright and screenwriter from Liverpool. She has written three plays. Caravan, her first, was written while she studied at Birmingham University and won her the George Devine award. Her second play, Normal, was followed by an entrance into screenwriting. Pleasureland is a 2003 television film about teen sexuality, for which Blakeman was nominated for the British Academy Television Craft Awards for Best New Writer in 2003, after which Blakeman wrote her third and most recent play, The Morris. In 2008, she wrote the screenplay for the award-winning television film Dustbin Baby, which was well received by critics, and for which she won the British Academy Children's Award for Best Writer. Helen is also the co-founder of Heroic Books LTD.

== Early life ==
Blakeman became involved in female morris dancing at age three. It was this dancing, combined with watching pantomimes and plays at Butlins, which led to her going into a career in theatre. She then joined the National Youth Theatre and studied drama at John Moores University. It was at university that she began to write. Blakeman then took a Master's course at Birmingham University under David Edgar.

== Career ==
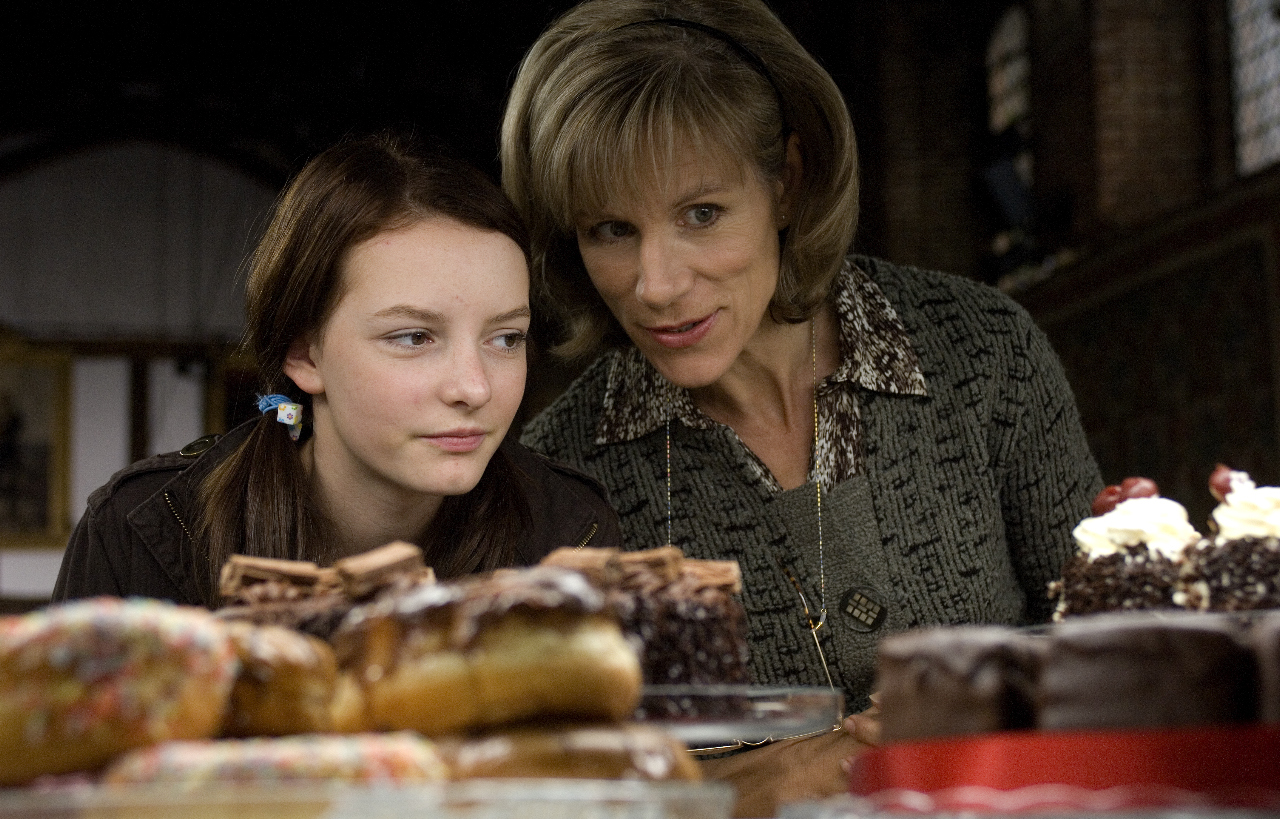
Publicity still for Dustbin Baby, written by Blakeman in 2008.

It was at Birmingham University that Blakeman wrote Caravan. Terry Johnson saw a performance of the play, and took a script to Mile Bradwell of Bush Theatre. The play was then shown at the Bush Theatre. The play tells the story of a mother and her two daughters staying in a caravan in north Wales, and Robert Butler of The Independent described the play as displaying "a lively gift for dramatising family disputes and representing young people's sex lives with a good-humoured frankness". A black comedy, David Benedict, also writing for The Independent, criticised the plot as "contrived", saying that "The problem with this kind of writing on stage is that unlike a soap, it has to have theatrical shape, not least in that it has to end". The play won Blakeman the George Devine award. Blakeman's second play, Normal, also opened at The Bush. Normal tells the story of a mother who lost two children in child birth and her surviving daughter, and the play alternates between a character's monologues in a police station and the events leading up to the incident which brought her to the station. Butler described this as "tougher going" than Caravan, and said that "Blakeman's talent for unlikely scenes is largely on hold".

Blakeman then entered television writing, writing Pleasureland, a television film for Channel Four as part of their Adult at 14 season. Pleasureland tells the story of 14‑year-old Jo, a girl who commits herself to be accepted by her classmates by losing her virginity. The Times described Pleasureland as "raw and alarming", and claimed it "is loaded with scenes certain to cause outrage". The show attracted controversy, with Michelle Elliott, from Kidscape, describing scenes depicting 14‑year-olds engaging in sexual activity as "basically irresponsible and sick." Blakeman responded by claiming that she only approached the subject after learning that Britain had the highest rate of teenage pregnancy in Europe, claiming "sex was more of a rumour mill when I was at school – but there is more pressure now to partake in that activity". Despite this, Blakeman was nominated at the British Academy Television Craft Awards for Best New Writer in 2003, but lost out to Rosemary Kay, for her work on This Little Life.

Blakeman's third play, The Morris, follows a troupe of female morris dancers. Female morris dancing is a tradition in the north west of England which is only loosely related to traditional morris dancing. Blakeman had been a female morris dancer until she was 16, but the play "is as much about bickering, bonding and fierce rivalry between women". It was given a two out of five by Lynne Walker, reviewing the play for The Independent.

In 2008, Blakeman wrote the screenplay for Dustbin Baby, a film based on the Jacqueline Wilson novel of the same name. She said that when she had read a copy of the novel, she "knew it was something [she] had to write". The film debuted on television in December of that year, and was received positively by critics. In an article in The Times David Chater awarded the programme the TV choice of the day, describing it as "tremendous", and "the wonderful surprise of Christmas". The Telegraph described the film as a "rare treat", as it is "something that teenagers and parents can watch together". The film won an International Emmy in the children and young people category, and Blakeman herself won the British Academy Children's Award for Best Writer.

She has been featured in Variety for her developing adaptation of the novel 'Listen to the Moon' by Michael Morpurgo.

== Works ==
=== Plays ===
- Caravan (1997)
- Normal (2000)
- The Morris (2005)

=== Films ===
- Pleasureland (2003)
- Dustbin Baby (2008)

=== Television ===
- Hetty Feather (2015-present)
- Call The Midwife (Series 7, Episode 5-2018)
