= Jinx (TV series) =

- Starring: Amber Beattie; Chizzy Akudolu; Gia Lodge-O'Meally; Ben Davies; James Ainsworth
- Opening theme: "Stir it Up" by Scarlettes
- Country of origin: United Kingdom
- No. of series: 1
- No. of episodes: 13

Production
- Executive producers: Melanie Stokes; Connal Orton
- Running time: 20-25 minutes

Original release
- Network: BBC Two, CBBC
- Release: 31 October 2009 – 23 January 2010

Jinx is a British children's comedy television sitcom based on the 'Lulu Baker' trilogy of books, written by Fiona Dunbar. The first series premiered on 31 October 2009 on CBBC and ended its initial run on 23 January 2010. The series follows the life of Lulu Baker, a teenager who is able to conjure spells. However, her fairy godmother, Cookie, stops things from going smoothly.

The first series was produced by Kindle Entertainment and over a three-month period, filmed in BBC Manchester studios and Oxford Road Studios, a second series has not been commissioned yet. Australian free-to-air channel ABC3 started airing the first episode on 28 September 2010.

== Overview ==
The series chronicles the life of Lulu Rose Katherine Baker, a teenager whose father has recently been remarried to a woman whom Lulu believes to be the worst stepmother ever. However, her fairy godmother, Cookie, soon comes to Lulu's aid and together they use spells for good, although most situations turn out badly for the people involved, usually due to Cookie's incompetence.

== Cast ==
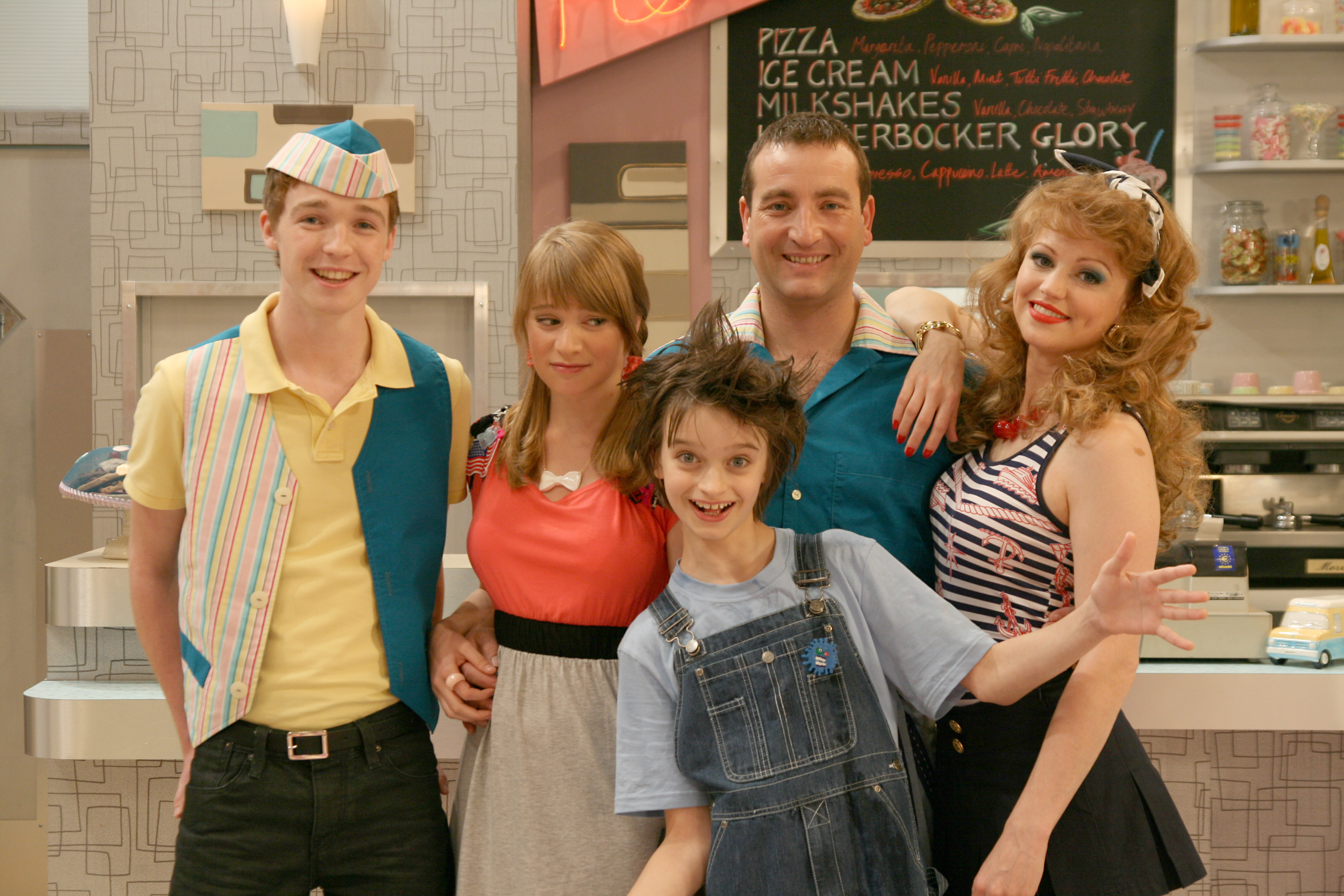
Series 1 Cast

- Amber Beattie as Lulu Baker
- Chizzy Akudolu as Cookie
- Ben-Ryan Davies as Chip
- Gia Lodge-O'Meally as Frenchy
- James Ainsworth as Torquil Le Bone
- Michael Nardone as Mike
- Lucy Chalkley as Minty Le Bone
- Morag Siller as Mrs Kilbraith

== Episodes ==
No.	Title	Directed by	Original release date
1	"Baker House Blend"	Angelo Abela	31 October 2009
Lulu's father has recently been remarried and Lulu is having a hard time coping with her new stepmother and brother, and when Torquil moves into Lulu's bedroom she's had enough. She soon discovers her birth mother's magic recipe book, which she uses to deal with Torquil and find her fairy godmother, Cookie.
2	"Dead and Butter Pudding"	Matt Bloom	1 November 2009
When Torquil turns into a Zombie after he accidentally eats magic bread and butter pudding, Lulu becomes panicked...after all, her step-brother wants to eat her brains and she is worried that her babysitting career is over.
3	"Cookie Chips"	Matt Bloom	7 November 2009
Lulu summons multiple clones of Chip with the aid of Cookie's recipe to assist her in preparing the school fashion show. However with Lulu already promising Frenchy she will not use magic to help her, Lulu's secret becomes hard to hide.
4	"Sweet Taste of Success"	Angelo Abela	8 November 2009
Lulu uses a recipe to read Frenchy's mind to receive answers during a geography test to beat a challenge submitted by Penny to see who can earn the highest score, but becomes confused when Frenchy nearly fails her test.
5	"The Chip Files"	Angelo Abela	14 November 2009
When Cookie turns Chip into an alien, nobody knows quite what to believe!
6	"A Slice of the Future"	Angelo Abela	15 November 2009
Thanks to Cookie, Mike's fish and chips pizzas enjoy a brief spell of popularity.
7	"Proof of the Pudding"	Angelo Abela	21 November 2009
Lulu engineers a reconciliation between her father and his long-estranged brother Paolo.
8	"A Slight Hiccup"	Angelo Abela	22 November 2009
It is Lulu's birthday and Minty's surprise gives her anything but pleasure.
9	"Ratatorquil"	Angelo Abela	12 December 2009
It is Valentine's Day and Lulu does not have a date, but Cookie has a solution.
10	"Minty Freshman"	Angelo Abela	13 December 2009
Lulu volunteers herself and Frenchy for the school talent show.
11	"Humble Pie and Mash"	Angelo Abela	26 December 2009
Lulu tries to turn her father into a television performer and ends up a celebrity herself.
12	"Flavour of the Month"	Angelo Abela	19 December 2009
Cookie provides a recipe which makes the world agree with everything Lulu says.
13	"Cake Expectations"	Angelo Abela	26 December 2009
Lulu has to do a presentation in class on a Victorian novel, but she hasn't read the book.
