= Carol Starks =

British actress

Carol Starks is a British actress.

She studied at the Central School of Speech and Drama, and landed her first role with the National Theatre in Sweeney Todd. She later found wider audiences through her recurring role in the soap opera Family Affairs, playing nurse Tanya Woods from 2003 to 2005. Other appearances include the BBC film Dustbin Baby, the 1992 TV serial The Guilty, in which she co-starred with Michael Kitchen, the Masterpiece Theatre film Reckless: The Sequel, ITV's The Bill and TV film Red Cap. She also played Amy Wakes in Casualty (series 19, episode 25) and Jane Folley in the episode "Deadly Slumber" (series 7, episode 1) of the ITV series Inspector Morse.
