= Bad Girls (Wilson novel) =

1996 novel by Jacqueline Wilson

- First edition cover
- Author: Jacqueline Wilson
- Illustrator: Nick Sharratt
- Language: English
- Genre: Children's literature
- Publisher: Doubleday
- Publication date: 2 May 1996
- Publication place: England
- Media type: Print (hardcover)
- Pages: 192
- ISBN: 978-0-385-40702-1

Bad Girls is a children's novel published in 1996, written by English author Jacqueline Wilson and illustrated by Nick Sharratt. The book revolves around a 10-year-old girl called Mandy being bullied by three girls called Kim, Sarah and Melanie. She later befriends a wayward teenage girl called Tanya who is in foster care and battling her own personal demons.

== Plot summary ==
10-year-old Mandy White is a lonely girl who is embarrassed with her mother, who constantly treats her like a five-year-old, controlling what she wears and how she styles her hair. Mandy is deeply insecure and has little knowledge of the outside world. As a result, she is mercilessly tormented at school by three classmates: Kim, Sarah, and Melanie, the latter of whom is a former friend. After an incident where she is nearly hit by a bus while crossing a road to avoid the bullies, she is kept at home from school and meets Tanya, a lively fourteen-year-old girl being fostered by Mandy's across-the-road neighbour. Despite disapproval from Mandy's mother (who is shamed by Mandy's classmates for being older than other parents), who is very overprotective of her and treats her as if she were much younger, the girls quickly become friends. They dream of a future where they will be older and independent, free from families and foster homes, and can live together and have fantastic adventures.

Despite Mandy's mother's disapproval of Tanya, Mandy's dad is sympathetic and invites her to come swimming with them. Mandy becomes afraid when she discovers that Tanya is a frequent shoplifter, but decides not to say anything in case they are forbidden from visiting each other. One day during the summer, Tanya and Mandy are caught by police when Tanya steals from an upmarket clothing shop in town, resulting in her being removed from her foster mother's house by social services. Mandy's mother is initially angry, but realizes she has been too strict with her and allows her to get new glasses and restyle her hair so she will not look quite as childish.

Mandy also gains a new friend in Arthur King, a shy boy in her class who is obsessed with fantasy stories. She greatly misses Tanya, who was taken to a new foster home after the shoplifting incident. When Mandy's new year at school begins she has a dedicated, hands-on teacher who proposes a weekly 'circle time' session with the kids: they speak about the reality and consequences of bullying. Despite Mandy fearing things getting worse from the session, everything turns out alright. Kim leaves Mandy alone after this, and Mandy reconciles with Melanie, who along with Sarah, no longer associates with Kim.

The novel ends on a happy note as Tanya (who has dyslexia and hates writing) has with great difficulty written a letter to Mandy, assuring her that they are best friends forever and will one day be free to see each other again as they had dreamed about.

Tanya makes a brief appearance in another of Jacqueline Wilson's novels, Dustbin Baby.

== Characters ==
=== Major characters ===
- Mandy White: Mandy is 10 years old. She is extremely shy and timid to the point that she does not even like telling her mother about her problems, and has very low self-esteem. She lives with her mother and father, both of whom are a lot older than the parents of Mandy's classmates. They often cuddle her, and treat her as if she were six rather than ten. Mandy is often teased for this, as she must wear babyish dresses, knitted cardigans, thick glasses, and has to style her hair in two plaits. Mandy is bullied by Kim, a pretty, popular classmate, and Kim's two friends Sarah and Melanie.
  - Tanya: Tanya is a 14-year-old girl who lives across the street from Mandy. She is living with a foster mother, Mrs. Williams, temporarily. Despite the large age gap, she takes a shine to Mandy, who is impressed by her bright orange, cropped hair, stilettos and crop tops. She is tough and streetwise (once standing up against Kim for Mandy), but kind too. She can be moody, as Mandy finds out, and hates schoolwork as she is dyslexic. Tanya is shown to like Nirvana; the first time Tanya visits Mandy she is shown to be wearing a Kurt Cobain T-shirt and the cause of his death - suicide - is something Tanya can relate to as her mother killed herself when she was very young. Mandy is shocked to discover, one day at the local shopping centre, that Tanya is a frequent shoplifter. However, she gets caught and is sent away from Mrs. Williams' house.
- Mandy's Mother: Mandy's mother is 55. She constantly babies Mandy and insists she wear her hair in two plaits, and frocks. She is a sensitive but firm woman. She is a large woman who squeezes herself into dresses that are too small for her.
- Mandy's Father: Mandy's father is 62 and works as a businessman, sporting a beard. Mandy's father is gentler than his wife and often keeps a level head in an escalated situation. He wears sharp suits for work, but loose smocks at home. He has been known to stick up for Tanya against his wife and also defend Mandy about her dress sense.
- Kim Matthews: Kim is a girl in Mandy's class. She is popular and confident; Mandy mentions that she would definitely make it as a model, with her shiny, black hair and her pearly white teeth. It is mentioned Kim said she was going to be a fashion model when she left school. Kim mercilessly bullies Mandy about her parents, her looks, her intelligence and her clothes. She is the leader in the bullying trio.
- Sarah Newman: Sarah is the second bully in the group. A show-off with thick blonde curls, she looks up to Kim and mostly picks on Mandy just to impress her. Sarah and Melanie often struggle to outdo each other when it comes to pleasing Kim.
- Melanie Holder: Melanie is just like Sarah, a minion of Kim's. However, Melanie used to be Mandy's best friend before Sarah and Kim befriended her. She uses a lot of Mandy's secrets and private imaginary games against Mandy to humiliate her, and to entertain the others. She and Sarah are constantly battling each other to satisfy Kim. It was thought that Melanie being unsettled by her parents' divorce instigated her to become involved in bullying.
- Arthur King: A boy in Mandy's class, just as shy and timid as she is. The pair become good friends toward the end of the novel. He enjoys chess and reading about King Arthur and his knights. He often feels guilty for not standing up for Mandy against the bullies.

=== Minor characters ===
- Pat Williams: The foster mother that Tanya lives with. She mostly fosters babies and toddlers.
- Ricky: The youngest of Pat's foster children, a baby in a pram.
- Charlie: A toddler in Pat's foster care.
- Simon: A toddler in Pat's foster care.
- Mrs. Edwards: The headmistress of the school.
- Mrs. Stanley: Mrs. Stanley is Mandy, Kim, Melanie, Sarah and Arthur's Year 5 class teacher.
- Miss Moseley: Miss Moseley is the characters' Year 6 class teacher.
- Mr. and Mrs. Patel: The Indian owners of a corner shop that Tanya and Mandy visit en route back from the park the day Mandy returns to school. Here, Tanya buys a newspaper and steals Mrs. Patel's bottle-green velvet scrunchie.

== Reception ==
Kirkus Reviews called the novel's protagonists "funny, heart-warming, and fully deserving of readers’ compassion". Although they found the novel to be "sometimes implausible", they concluded that "youngsters will have a jolly good time with these bad, no, great girls".

Publishers Weekly disagreed with the claim that Bad Girls is implausible. In starred review, they highlighted Wilson's ability to "shap[e] convincing characters, dialogue and plot" in a "tightly written tale" that "proves that bad girls can make for a good story".
