= Simon Roberts (actor) =

British actor

Simon Roberts is a British actor on both stage and screen. His television appearances include the role of Alfred Lee in the Agatha Christie's Poirot television film, Hercule Poirot's Christmas.

== Selected film and television roles ==
- Dustbin Baby - Mr Stevenson
- Fat Slags (2004) - Horner Prize presenter
- Absolute Power, Pope Idol (2003) - Vicar
- Swiss Toni, Left Hand Drive (2003)
- Doctors, Cats (2002) - Harry Nicholas
- Ted & Ralph (1998) - Cousin Jack
- Agatha Christie's Poirot - Hercule Poirot's Christmas (1995) - Alfred Lee

== Selected stage roles ==
- Wet House (2014) - Spencer
- A Midsummer Night's Dream (1990) - Theseus/Oberon
