= Adult at 14 season =

- Country of origin: Great Britain
- No. of seasons: 1
- No. of episodes: 4

Original release
- Network: Channel 4
- Release: 16 November 2003 – 2003

Adult at 14 season is part of the 2003 autumn season on the UK television station Channel 4. The season looked into the lives of British teenagers and centred on issues such as sex and relationships and potential long-term consequences such as teenage pregnancy or sexually transmitted infections. It also supported the age of consent remaining at sixteen in order to protect vulnerable young people from abuse, but they campaigned for changes to the Sexual Offences Bill which, as it stands, will criminalise under 16s who engage in any form of consensual non-penetrative sexual activity.

== Season ==
The season includes a full-length Drama, documentary and several talk segments debating the issues facing teenagers.

- Pleasureland

A vibrant and provocative feature-length drama focusing on a group of teenagers in Liverpool who can't wait to grow up. "Pleasureland," tackles the incendiary subject of underage sex from the perspective of a 14-year-old girl who would rather get laid or get drunk than study.

- Sex before 16

An hour long documentary about the age of consent entitled Sex Before 16, How The Law Is Failing.

- 14 Alone

A group of ten 14-year-old boys and girls spend five days and nights together in a house divested of the trappings of 'teendom': no TV, video games, mobile phones or CD players are allowed.

- Porn To Be Young

Also known as Kids on porn, a frank look at young people's attitudes to pornography and the role it plays in shaping their adolescent lives. The programme claims it will offer an insight into "this tender age when children are on the cusp of adulthood". Can adolescents distinguish between the fantasy world of pornography and the reality of sexual experience?
