= Fiona Dunbar =

Fiona Dunbar is a children's author and illustrator based in the United Kingdom.

== Biography ==
She was born in 1961 in Hemel Hempstead, Hertfordshire. She attended St Mary's School in Gerrard's Cross and left school at 16 to go to art college in High Wycombe. After working in a commercial art studio, which she labelled as 'disposible' work, and then as a freelance illustrator, she embarked on a writing career. Since her first book, The Truth Cookie, was published in 2010, she has written two trilogies and Toonhead. Her Lulu Baker trilogy was adapted to become a children's TV series called Jinx by Kindle Entertainment starring Amber Beattie. Jinx was first screened on CBBC in Autumn 2009.

Divine Freaks, the first of her new series featuring the character Kitty Slade, was published on 5 May 2011. The second of the series, Fire & Roses, was published on 1 September 2011.

On 10 February 2013, Dunbar appeared on Sky News to voice her opinions and concerns on library closures in the UK. In this appearance, she said how the government 'needed to bring libraries forward into the modern age' and that the situation was 'down to central government' (as opposed to local councils).

== Bibliography ==
=== Lulu Baker trilogy ===
- The Truth Cookie
- Cupid Cakes
- Chocolate Wishes

=== The Silk Sisters trilogy ===
- Pink Chameleon
- Blue Gene Baby
- Tiger Lily Gold

=== Kitty Slade Mysteries ===
- Divine Freaks
- Fire and Roses
- Venus Rocks
- Raven Hearts

=== Standalone novels ===
- Toonhead
