= New Heys Comprehensive School =

Coordinates: 53.369°N 2.890°W

Location
- Heath Road; Liverpool, Merseyside, L19 4TN; England

Information
- Local authority: Liverpool City Council
- Specialist: Business
- Department for Education URN: 104699 Tables
- Ofsted: Reports
- Gender: co-educational
- Age: 11 to 18
- Enrolment: 817
- Colour
- Website: www.newheys.co.uk

New Heys Comprehensive School or New Heys Community College was an English comprehensive school in Liverpool specialising within Business.

The school worked closely with businesses such as the New Mersey Retail Park, Jaguar and Scottish Power to provide their children with a taste of business life.

== Merger ==
It was announced in early 2009, that New Heys Comprehensive would move to St Benedicts' Catholic College and form a new, 'Business and Faith Academy' on the Garston site, leaving the original New Heys to be rebuilt to form a housing development. This comes as one of the major changes that will happen from 2011 to 2017.

From around November/December 2013 New Heys School was demolished to make way for Housing and work started in 2014

The school is now known as The Academy of St Nicholas.
