= Pleasureland =

2003 film directed by Brian Percival

- Genre: Drama
- Based on: Pleasureland (opera) by: John Adams
- Written by: Helen Blakeman
- Screenplay by: Helen Blakeman
- Directed by: Brian Percival
- Starring: Katie Lyon; Claire Hackett; Philip Olivier; Barry Sloane
- Composers: Ric Featherstone; Magnus Fiennes
- Country of origin: United Kingdom
- Original language: English

Production
- Executive producer: Natasha Dack
- Producer: Joanne O'Sullivan
- Production location: Merseyside
- Cinematography: David Katznelson
- Editor: Kristina Hetherington
- Running time: 71 minutes
- Production company: Kudos Productions

Original release
- Network: Channel 4
- Release: 16 November 2003

Pleasureland is a 2003 Channel 4 feature-length television drama focusing on a group of teenagers in Liverpool who feel pressured to grow up. Written by Helen Blakeman, directed by Brian Percival and produced by Kudos, the makers of the BBC One espionage series Spooks.

The drama was based on the John Adams opera Pleasureland and was filmed on location in Liverpool as part of the Channel 4's Adult at 14 season.

== Plot ==
A modern tale of teenage sex, Pleasureland is the story of Jo, a 14-year-old Scouser, who wakes up one day and decides she has to change her virgin status. In fact, she makes a promise to herself: 'I, Joanna Mosscroft, aged 14, year nine, almost year 10, promise me, Joanna Mosscroft, to have sex.' She is also motivated to have sex because it seems as if that is what all of the girls at school seem to be talking about; thus, she feels pressured to lose her virginity. With that, she sets off on a rollercoaster journey of first-time-for-everything. Jo soon becomes embroiled in a world of sex, drugs and betrayal.

== Cast ==
- Katie Lyon as Joanna Mosscroft
- Claire Hackett as Julie Mosscroft
- Michael Dunn as Greg Mosscroft
- Melissa Edwards as Michelle Mosscroft
- Michael Bailey as Greg Mosscroft
- Tara Wells as Katie
- Leah Whittaker as Sophie
- Claire Bailey as Lisa
- Philip Olivier as Ben
- Barry Sloane as Darren
- Holly Shwenn as Leanne
- Letitia Denny as Chantelle
- Mark Fenna as Rocky
- Clive Moore as Mr. Stevens
- Guy Parry as Guy in Bar
- Sarah Harvey as Train Girl

== Critical reception ==
The show attracted criticism by children's campaigners over the way in which it depicted teenage sex.

Victoria Segal writing for The Times praised Katie Lyons performance as the protagonist and labelled her as 'one to watch'. She also selected Pleasureland as her 'Pick of the day' in the TV section of The Sunday Times on November 16, 2003, despite describing it as 'difficult and unpleasant viewing'.

== Awards ==
| Year | Award | Nominee | Category | Result | Ref. |
|---|---|---|---|---|---|
| 2003 | Royal Television Society Programme Awards | Katie Lyon | Network Newcomer – On Screen | Won | |
| 2003 | Royal Television Society Programme Awards | Helen Blakeman (writer) | Network Newcomer – Behind the Screen | Nominated | |
| 2004 | Royal Television Society Design and Craft Awards | David Katznelson (DOP) | Photography (Drama) | Nominated | |
| 2004 | British Academy Television Craft Awards | Helen Blakeman (writer) | New Writer | Nominated | |
