= Dakota Blue Richards =

British actress (born 1994)

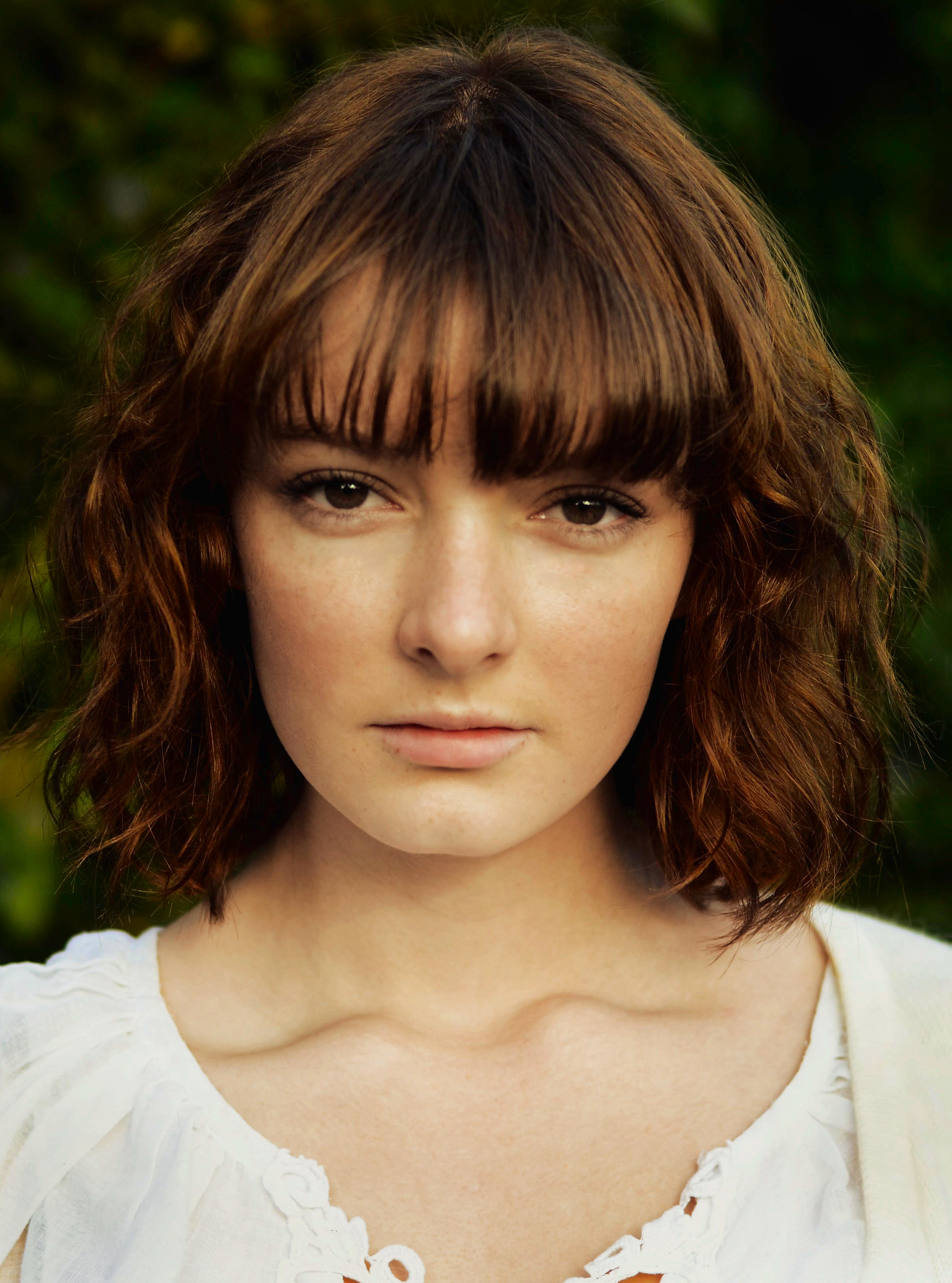
- Richards in 2012
- Born: 11 April 1994 (age 32); Chelsea, London, England, United Kingdom
- Occupation: Actress
- Years active: 2006–present
- Partner: Will Thomson
- Children: 1

Dakota Blue Richards (born 11 April 1994) is an English actress. Her film debut at the age of 13 was in The Golden Compass, as the lead character Lyra Belacqua. Other lead roles include the wayward teenager April in Dustbin Baby and Maria in the 2009 film The Secret of Moonacre. In 2011, she played Franky Fitzgerald in the third generation cast of British teen drama Skins. She has also played roles in television, film and on stage.

== Early life and education ==
Richards was born on 11 April 1994 at the Chelsea and Westminster Hospital in the Fulham Road, London. The family moved to Sussex, where she attended Newlands School. She attended St Paul's Primary School in Brighton, and later Blatchington Mill School in Hove and KBis Theatre School in Brighton.

== Career ==
=== The Golden Compass ===
After seeing the stage adaptation of His Dark Materials at the National Theatre, she says she "just wanted to be Lyra". The audition process had ten thousand applicants, and Philip Pullman (author of the books) said, "As soon as I saw Dakota's screen test, I realised that the search was over." Chris Weitz, the director, added that Richards "made what should have been an extremely difficult decision quite easy." The Golden Compass with Richards as Lyra was released worldwide in December 2007 and grossed $372 million.

Richards' performance in The Golden Compass was variously described as "efficient", "a decent job", "nicely played", and "enchanting." One review called the selection of Richards for the role of Lyra "terrific casting". Peter Bradshaw of The Guardian commented "Lyra is nicely played by 13-year-old newcomer Dakota Blue Richards, though with an Artful Dodger-ish 'urchin' accent that comes and goes a bit", while Empire noted that she "struggles with lumpy dialogue". Roger Ebert was more effusive, calling Richards "a delightful find" who was "pretty, plucky, forceful, self-possessed, charismatic and just about plausible as the mistress of an armored bear and the protector of Dust."

=== Skins ===
Richards appeared in series 5 and 6 of the E4 teen drama Skins, which premiered on 27 January 2011. She played the character of Franky Fitzgerald with her androgynous looks, wacky dress sense, two gay dads (one played by John Sessions) and a tragic cyber-bullying backstory. Originally she auditioned for the role of Liv, and in an interview explained "only became Franky right at the very end of the audition process". As a member of the third generation of its young cast, Richards said "It's crazy to be part of this Skins phenomenon, it's as much a lifestyle choice as anything because of the attention that comes with it."

=== ChickLit ===
In this full-length film, Richards plays a protagonist's sister-in-law, cajoled into acting the role of author of a chick-lit novel written by four patrons of a local pub in Norfolk. The character, Zoe, demands £500 a week for as long as the four true authors need her. The film is an erotic British comedy.

=== Other roles ===
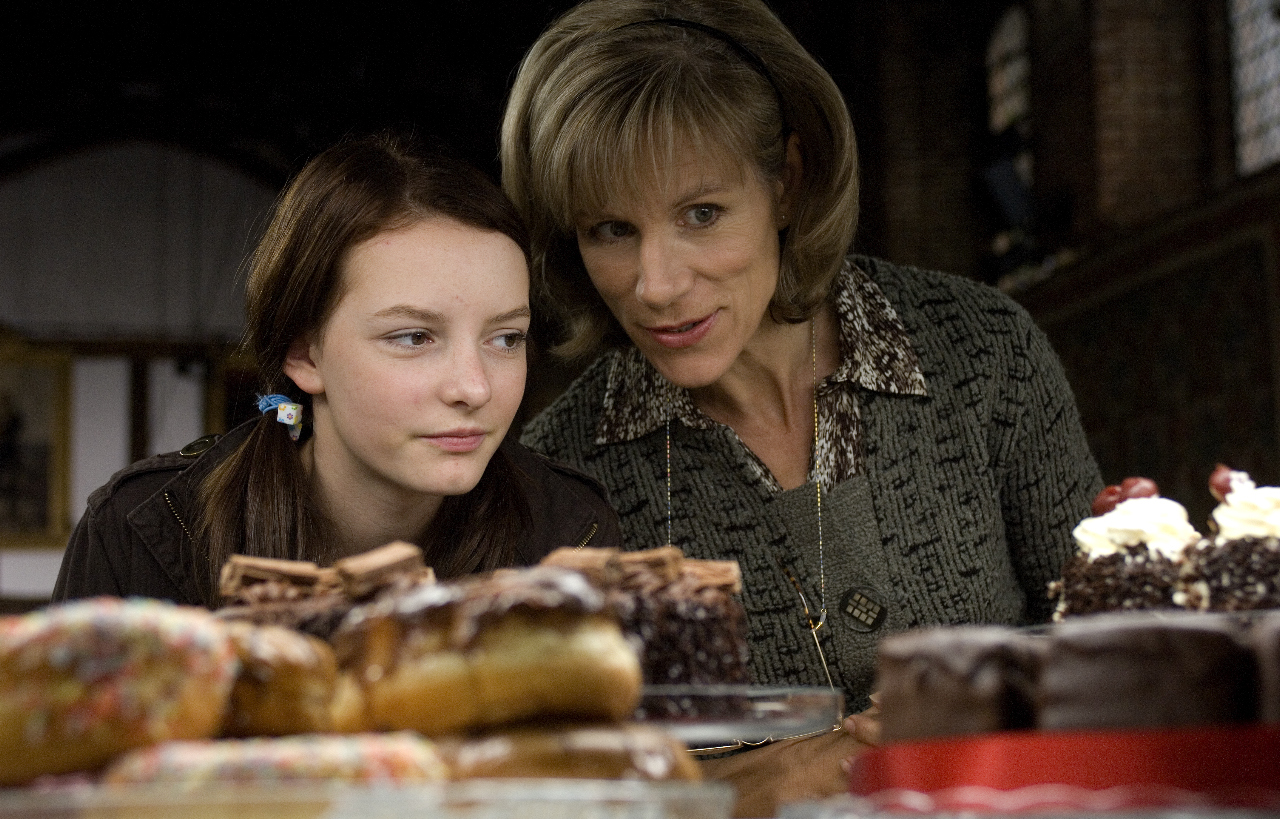
Richards (left) as April with Marion (played by Juliet Stevenson) in Dustbin Baby

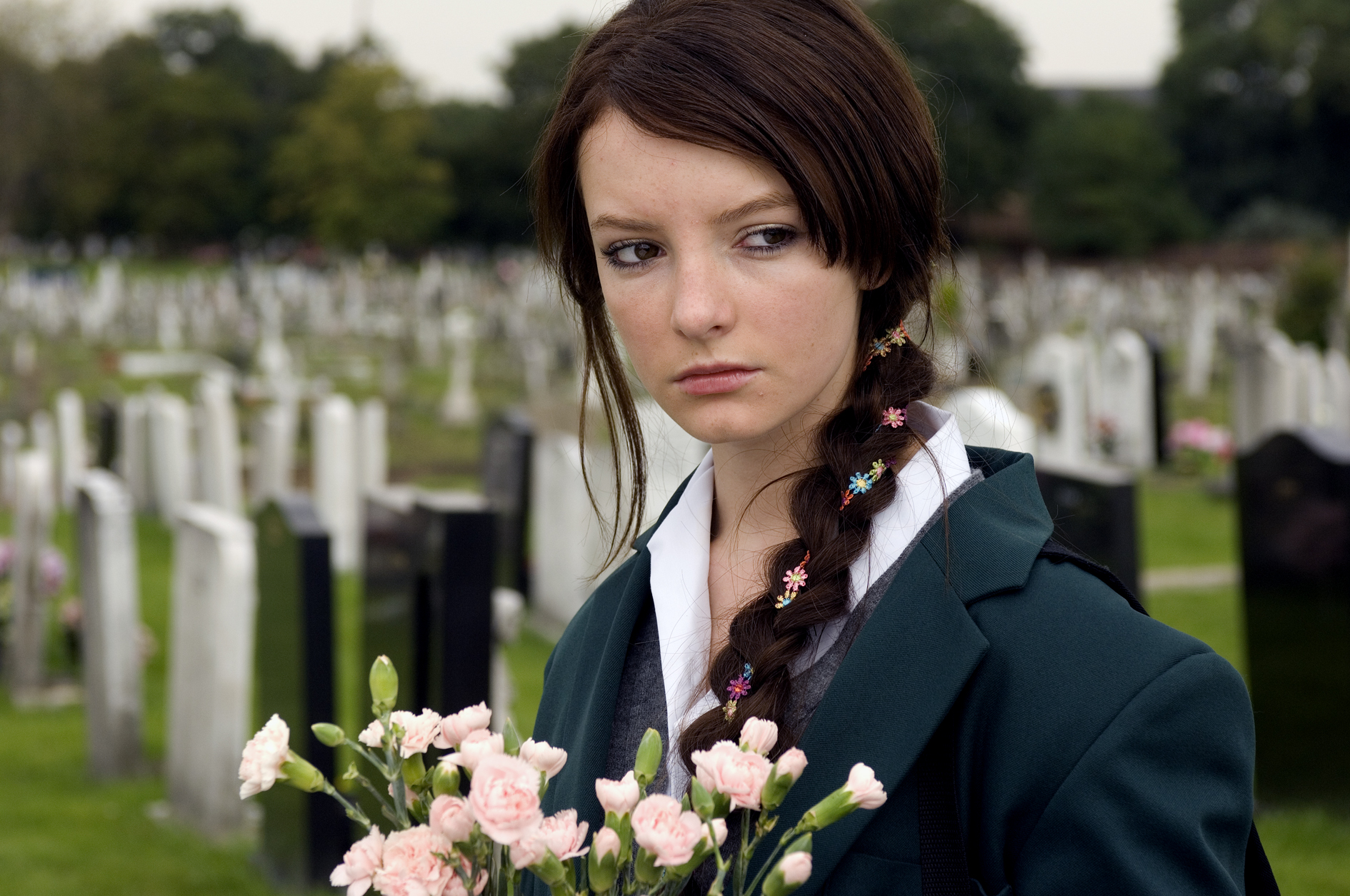
Richards in Dustbin Baby

Before The Golden Compass was released, Richards had already been cast as the lead in another film, The Secret of Moonacre, her second book-to-film adaptation, in which she would play Maria Merryweather from the book The Little White Horse. Principal photography began in October 2007 and the film was eventually released February 2009.

In December 2008, Richards played April Johnson in Dustbin Baby, the BBC dramatisation of the Jacqueline Wilson novel of the same name. She described April as a difficult character to play, "she is a really different person to me. On the one hand, she does go through normal things that I can relate to, such as fighting with your parents or getting presents you don't like; but on the other, she has had such a hard life."

In April 2012, she performed a British indie feature The Fold in Bristol and Cornwall, playing Eloise, the daughter of an Anglican priest. The film is written by Poppy Cogan, winner of the Harpers/William Morris Short Script Award, and directed by John Jencks. It commercially opened in limited release in UK on 24 March 2014. The movie won best screenplay at the Women's Independent Festival in LA, Best Picture at the Independent Film Makers Showcase and was nominated for best drama at the National Film Awards.

Richards played a title role in ITV thriller Lightfields alongside Jill Halfpenny and Kris Marshall. It is a supernatural five-part drama which follows on from the ITV drama Marchlands and tells the story of three families living in the same house with a ghost during different time periods.

In 2013, she appeared in French filmmaker Stéphanie Joalland's sci-fi thriller The Quiet Hour, about a brother and sister trying to survive in a post-apocalyptic England. During the same year she filmed a short film entitled Girl Power.

Richards made her stage debut in an ensemble cast featuring Kirsty Besterman, Robert Cavanah, Flora Montgomery, Wilf Scolding, Nakay Kpaka, and Ria Zmitrowicz in English Touring Theatre's 2015 revival of Tom Stoppard's Arcadia.

Between 2016 and 2018, she was cast in the part of WPC Shirley Trewlove in the Endeavour television series. In 2018, she was cast for the part of Margaret Osborne in the ITV drama Beecham House. It began airing in 2019.

== Personal life ==
Richards revealed that as a young actress, she "suffered at the hands of school bullies because of her ginger hair".

In 2008, she attended the "Our Space" camp of the Equality and Human Rights Commission (in the Lake District), which gathered "teenagers from different backgrounds to discuss human rights and discrimination". Since 2010 she has supported Action for Children, a charity in the United Kingdom helping vulnerable young people overcome injustice and deprivation. In 2011, she fronted their advertising campaign to promote a new charity project.

Richards also backs The Young Actors Group, an acting school in Brighton opened in 2014 that gives children and teenagers the training to work professionally in stage and screen.

Richards describes herself as "quite into modern art and abstract stuff" and a fan of photographer Christian Coigny, artists Tracey Emin and Damien Hirst, and films from Studio Ghibli.

On 30 March 2025, Richards announced via Instagram that she was expecting her first child alongside longtime partner Will Thomson. Their daughter was born in May of that year.

== Filmography ==
=== Film ===
Year	Title	Role	Notes
2007	The Golden Compass	Lyra Belacqua	Debut role
2008	The Secret of Moonacre	Maria Merryweather	
2009	Five Miles Out	Cassey	Short film
2014	The Fold	Eloise Ashton	
2014	The Quiet Hour	Sarah	
2014	Girl Power	Cassey	Short film
2016	ChickLit	Zoe	Feature film

=== Television ===
Year	Title	Role	Notes
2008	Dustbin Baby	April Johnson	Television film
2011–2012	Skins	Franky Fitzgerald	18 episodes
2013	Lightfields	Eve	5 episodes
2016–2018	Endeavour	WPC Shirley Trewlove	13 episodes
2019	Beecham House	Margaret Osborne	6 episodes
2023	Celebrity Mastermind	Herself	episode #21.11

== Stage ==
Year	Title	Role	Notes
2015	Arcadia	Thomasina	English Touring Theatre
2015	A Streetcar Named Desire	Stella	Curve, Leicester
2017	What The Butler Saw	Geraldine	Curve, Leicester
2023	Anthropology	Angie	Hampstead Theatre, London

== Awards and nominations ==
Year	Organisation	Award	Work	Result
2007	Broadcast Film Critics Association	Critics' Choice Award	The Golden Compass	Nominated
2007	London Film Critics Circle	Breakthrough Award	The Golden Compass	Nominated
2008	Young Artist Award	Best Performance in a Feature Film – Leading Young Actress	The Golden Compass	Nominated
2008	Academy of Science Fiction, Fantasy & Horror Films	Saturn Award	The Golden Compass	Nominated
2011	TV Choice Awards	Best Actress	Skins	Nominated
2011	Royal Television Society (RTS)	Best Actress	Skins	Nominated
