= Midnight (disambiguation) =

Midnight is a time of day.

Midnight may also refer to:

== Books ==
- Midnight (Koontz novel), a 1989 novel by Dean Koontz
- Midnight (Hunter novel), a 2005 novel by Erin Hunter
- Midnight (Wilson novel), a 2003 children's novel by Jacqueline Wilson
- Midnight: A Romance of China, 1930, a 1933 novel by Mao Dun
- Midnight: A Gangster Love Story, a 2008 novel by Sister Souljah
- Midnight (comics), a set-index of several uses, including:
  - Midnight (DC Comics), a comic book character
  - Midnight (Jeff Wilde), a Marvel Comics character in the Moon Knight series
  - Midnight Sun (character) or Midnight, a Marvel Comics character
- Midnight, a previous name of the Globe tabloid newspaper
- Mr. Midnight, a Singaporean children's horror book series
- Midnight Songs poetry (Ziye Ge), a poetry type
- Wangan Midnight, a 1991 Japanese manga series

== Film and television ==
- Midnight (1918 film), a German silent crime film
- Midnight (1922 film), a lost American silent drama
- Midnight (1931 film), a film starring Eve Gray
- Midnight (1934 film), a film noir directed by Chester Erskine, with Humphrey Bogart in an early role
- Midnight (1939 film), a romantic comedy starring Claudette Colbert, Don Ameche and John Barrymore
- Midnight (1949 film), a Mexican crime film
- Midnight (1982 film), a film by John Russo
- Midnight (1989 film), a film by Norman Thaddeus Vane
- Midnight (1998 film), a Brazilian film by Walter Salles
- Midnight (2021 film), a South Korean film
- Midnight (2024 film), a Japanese short film by Takashi Miike
- "Midnight" (Doctor Who), an episode of Doctor Who
- "Midnight" (Fringe), an episode of Fringe
- @midnight, a comedy game show

== Games ==
- Midnight (Dungeons & Dragons), a campaign setting for the role-playing game Dungeons & Dragons
- Midnight (game), a game played with six dice
- Midnight or Boxcars (slang), the outcome of rolling two sixes with a pair of dice
- Midnight, the setting for video game The Lords of Midnight

== Music ==
=== Musicians and bands ===
- Midnight (musician) (1962–2009), former lead singer of Crimson Glory
- Midnight (band), an American metal band
- The Midnight, an American synthwave band
- The Midnights, a New Zealand reggae band
- Midnight Boy (born 1988), Swedish singer and songwriter
- Charlie Midnight, American songwriter and record producer

=== Albums and EPs ===
- Midnight (Diane Schuur album), 2003
- Midnight (Grace Potter album), 2015
- Midnight (Set It Off album), 2019
- Midnight, a 2017 album by Lewis Watson
- Midnight ('68 EP), a 2013 EP by '68
- Midnight (Loona EP), a Korean language EP by Loona
- The Midnight (EP), a 2000 EP by Lemon Jelly
- Midnights, a 2022 album by Taylor Swift

=== Songs ===
- "Midnight" (Beast song), 2012
- "Midnight" (Coldplay song), 2014, from Ghost Stories
- "Midnight" (Elán song), from Street Child
- "Midnight" (Jessie Ware song), 2017
- "Midnight" (Logic song)
- "Midnight" (Red Foley song), 1952
- "Midnight" (Tor Miller song), 2015, from Headlights EP
- "Midnight / Choice", a 1991 single by Orbital
- "Midnight", by The Birthday Massacre from Pins and Needles
- "Midnight", by the Cat Empire from Rising with the Sun
- "Midnight", by Chancellor from Chancellor
- "Midnight", by EXID from We
- "Midnight", by Ice-T from O.G. Original Gangster
- "Midnight", by Joe Satriani from Surfing with the Alien
- "Midnight", by The Monkees from Pool It!
- "Midnight", by Red Hot Chili Peppers from By the Way
- "Midnight", by Caravan Palace from <|°_°|> (also known as Robot Face or Robot)
- "Midnight", by Jason J. which represented Guam in the American Song Contest
- "Midnight", by Yazoo from Upstairs at Eric's

== Ships ==
- SS Midnight, two vessels
- USS Midnight, two U.S. Navy vessels

== Sports ==
- Midnight league, a series of initiatives for urban youth sport
  - Midnight basketball, midnight leagues in basketball
- Midnight (horse), a bucking rodeo horse
- Midnight (wrestler) (born 1965), Ann Marie Crooks, Jamaican bodybuilder and professional wrestler

== Other uses ==
- Midnight blue, a dark shade of blue
- Johnny Midnight (broadcaster) (1941–2014), Filipino radio and television broadcaster
- Midnight, Mississippi, U.S., an unincorporated community
- 'Midnight', a hybrid cultivar of Poa pratensis (Kentucky bluegrass)
- Midnight (bushranger), alias of Australian bushranger Thomas Law

== See also ==
- 12 o'clock (disambiguation)
- After Midnight (disambiguation)
- At Midnight (disambiguation)
- Midnight Cowboy (disambiguation)
- Midnight Hour (disambiguation)
- The Midnight Man (disambiguation)
- Midnight Special (disambiguation)
- Midnight Sun (disambiguation)
- Midnight Song (disambiguation)
- Midnite (disambiguation)
- Round Midnight (disambiguation)
