= Midnight sky =

Midnight sky, sky at midnight, or variation, may refer to:

- The Midnight Sky (film), a 2020 post-apocalyptic science-fiction U.S. film
- "Midnight Sky", a 2020 song by Miley Cyrus
- "Midnight Sky (Part 1 & 2)", a 1974 song by The Isley Brothers from Live It Up

== See also ==
- Hot Sky at Midnight (novel), a 1994 novel by Robert Silverberg, see Robert Silverberg bibliography
- In The Midnight Sky (song), a 1989 single by 'Viktor Lazlo' off the album Hot & Soul
- Bison-Black-as-Midnight-Sky (character), a DC Comics fictional character
- Midnight star (disambiguation)
- Midnight Sun (disambiguation)
- Midnight (disambiguation)
- Sky (disambiguation)
