= Midnight Star =

Midnight star, star of midnight, or variation, may refer to:

== Entertainment ==
- Star of Midnight, a 1935 U.S. film
- The Midnight Star, a 2016 fantasy novel by Marie Lu
- Midnight Star (band), a U.S. band
- "Midnight Star" (song), a 1984 song by Weird Al Yankovic, off the album "Weird Al" Yankovic in 3-D
- Midnight Star, a series of videogames created by Industrial Toys
  - Midnight Star (video game), a 2015 first-person shooter
  - Midnight Star: Renegade, a 2016 shooting game

== Places ==
- "The Midnight Star", a notable squat in Sydney, Australia; see Squatting in Australia
- The Midnight Star, Deadwood, South Dakota, USA; a casino

== Other uses ==
- Yamaha Midnight Star, a motorcycle
- Midnight Star, a 116.75-carat ruby in the Harry Frank Guggenheim Hall of Gems and Minerals

== See also ==
- Midnight Sun (disambiguation)
- Midnight (disambiguation)
- Star (disambiguation)
