= Midnight (comics) =

Midnight, in comics, may refer to:

- Midnight (DC Comics) a DC Comics character
- Midnight (Jeff Wilde), a Marvel Comics character
- Midnight Sun (character) or Midnight
- Captain Midnight, a radio play character who was adapted into a comic book series by Fawcett Comics
- Doctor Mid-Nite, a DC Comics superhero
- Jessica Midnight, a DC Comics character and member of Checkmate
- Midnight's Fire, a Marvel Comics supervillain
- Midnight Kiss, a 2005 series from Markosia
- Midnight Man (comics), a Marvel Comics character and enemy of Moon Knight
- Midnight, Mass, a comic book series from Vertigo
- Midnight Men, a 1993 mini-series from Epic Comics
- Midnight Mover, a mini-series from Oni Press
- Midnight Nation, a 2000 Top Cow limited series by J. Michael Straczynski
- Midnight Panther, a hentai manga
- Midnight Sons, a Marvel Comics team of supernatural characters
- Midnight Tales, a comic book series from Charlton Comics
- Midnighter, the Wildstorm character and member of The Authority
- Neil Gaiman's Midnight Days, a collection of some of Neil Gaiman's early work at Vertigo
- Nemuri Kayama, also known as Midnight, a character in My Hero Academia
- Sandman Midnight Theatre, a comic book crossover between the two main DC Comics characters named Sandman
- Papa Midnite, a DC and Vertigo Comics character from Hellblazer and an eponymous spin-off miniseries
- Super Midnight, a character from Shang-Chi

== See also ==
- Midnight (disambiguation)
