= Midnight Song =

Midnight Song can refer to:

- Song at Midnight, a 1937 Chinese film
- Midnight Songs poetry
- Midnight Song, another name for Friedrich Nietzsche's Zarathustra's roundelay

== See also ==
- Midnight (disambiguation)
- The Midnights
- The Midnight
