= USS Midnight =

USS Midnight is the name of two ships in the service of the United States Navy.

- USS Midnight (1861), a Union ship purchased in 1861 for use in the naval blockade of the South.
- USS Midnight (IX-149), a concrete barge that would be renamed Trefoil and serve from 1944 until 1948.

== See also ==
- Midnight (disambiguation)#Ships for other ships
