= USS Trathen =

Fletcher-class destroyer

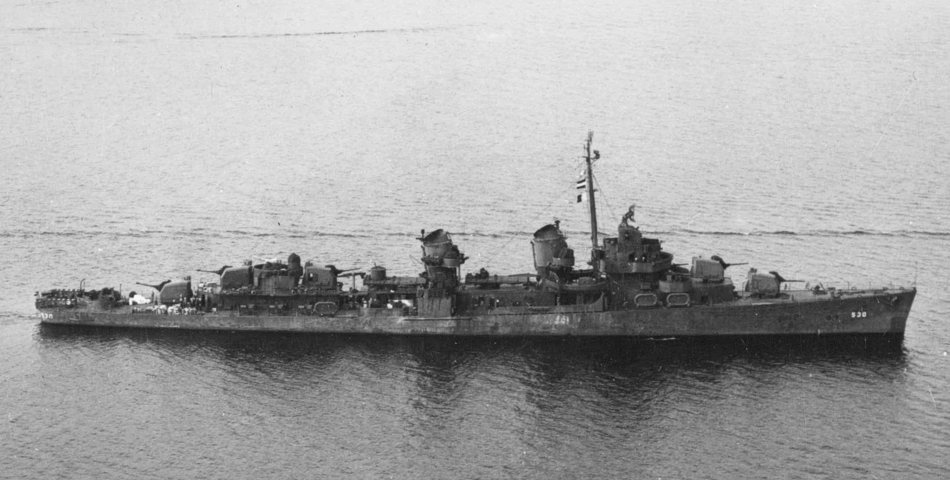

History

United States
- Name: Trathen
- Namesake: James Trathen
- Builder: Bethlehem Shipbuilding Corporation, San Francisco, California
- Laid down: 17 March 1942
- Launched: 22 October 1942
- Commissioned: 28 May 1943 to 18 January 1946; 1 August 1951 to 11 May 1965
- Stricken: 1 November 1972
- Fate: Used as target hulk November 1973, scrapped

General characteristics
- Class & type: Fletcher-class destroyer
- Displacement: 2,050 tons
- Length: 376 ft 6 in (114.7 m)
- Beam: 39 ft 8 in (12.1 m)
- Draft: 17 ft 9 in (5.4 m)
- Propulsion: 60,000 shp (45 MW); 2 propellers
- Speed: 35 knots (65 km/h; 40 mph)
- Range: 6500 nmi. (12,000 km) at 15 kt
- Complement: 336
- Armament: 5 × single Mk 12 5 in (127 mm)/38 guns; 5 × twin 40 mm (1.6 in) Bofors AA guns; 7 × single 20 mm (0.8 in) Oerlikon AA guns; 2 × quintuple 21 in (533 mm) torpedo tubes; 6 × single depth charge throwers; 2 × depth charge racks

USS Trathen (DD-530) was a World War II-era Fletcher-class destroyer in the service of the United States Navy from 1943 to 1946 and 1951 to 1965.

== History ==
=== World War II ===
Trathen was named after Lieutenant Commander James Trathen, commander of USS Midnight (1861) during the American Civil War. She was laid down on 17 March 1942 at San Francisco, California, by the Bethlehem Steel Co.; launched on 22 October 1942; sponsored by Mrs. Cassin Young, wife of Captain Cassin Young who was awarded the Medal of Honor for his valor as commanding officer of Vestal (AR-4) during the Japanese attack on Pearl Harbor; and commissioned on 28 May 1943.

==== 1943 ====
Following training operations in the Hawaiian area, Trathen joined Rear Admiral Willis A. Lee's Task Force (TF) 11 to take part in the reoccupation of Baker Island. The target isle, a tiny elliptical speck of land, lay nearer to the Japanese-held northern Gilbert Islands than Funafuti in the Ellice group and presented a valuable staging area for projected aerial search and photo reconnaissance missions against the Japanese mandates. Lee, in Hercules (AK-41), led TF 11's sortie from Pearl Harbor on 25 August 1943, and his ships arrived off Baker on 1 September. While the transports and Ashland (LSD-1) disembarked their troops and disgorged their cargoes shoreward, Trathen stood by and provided fighter-direction services to the Grumman F6F Hellcats from Belleau Wood (CVL-24) and Princeton (CVL-23). During the action, the destroyer directed the F6F's to a radar contact 32 miles away. They soon came upon the snooping Kawanishi H8K (Allied identifier: "Emily") flying boat and dispatched her so fast that no radio report from the Japanese got out over the airwaves. Two days later, Trathen again vectored the Hellcats to another "Emily" which they also splashed into the sea.

With Baker secure and the priceless airfield constructed and ready for use by 11 September, Trathen headed for Hawaii. On 29 September, the ship commenced screening operations for Task Group (TG) 14.5, as it sortied from Pearl Harbor, bound for Wake Island. Under the command of Rear Admiral Alfred E. Montgomery, this fast carrier task force—the largest yet assembled—consisted of Essex (CV-9), Yorktown (CV-10), Lexington (CV-16), Cowpens (CVL-25), Independence (CVL-22), and Belleau Wood. On 5 and 6 October, Montgomery's planes made six strikes, flying 738 combat sorties while battleships and cruisers provided their heavy gunfire for further harassment of the Japanese-held island. Despite a cracked high-pressure turbine casing, Trathen retired with the task force back toward the Hawaiian Islands and arrived at Pearl Harbor on the 11th.

Temporary patching at Pearl Harbor permitted the destroyer to proceed to Bremerton, Washington, and permanent repairs at the Puget Sound Navy Yard. The ship sailed for the Hawaiian Islands on 21 November and reached Pearl Harbor six days later. Following training exercises with land-based aircraft off Oahu, Trathen's commanding officer was designated Commander, Task Unit (TU) 16.15.2, and his ship joined Martin (DE-30) and SS Mormacport. The ships sailed via Canton Island, Funafuti, and Tarawa to Makin Island where they arrived on 18 December. The next day, the destroyer sped 125 miles to the scene of a downed PBY Catalina, rescued the patrol bomber's crew, and returned to Makin on the 20th. On the return leg of the mission, the ship's radar picked up a formation of Japanese medium bombers bound for the Gilberts. Evidently attracted to bigger game, the bombers sped on. However, one which passed over the ship was taken under fire but apparently suffered no damage.

After pressing on to Abemama Island, Trathen and Le Hardy (DE-20) got underway on Christmas Day 1943 to escort SS Mormacport back to Hawaii. One day out, an "Emily" spotted the three-ship convoy but stayed tantalizingly out of reach of the Allied ships' guns. Detaching Le Hardy that evening, Trathen and Mormacport proceeded on to Hawaii and arrived at Pearl Harbor on New Year's Day 1944.

==== 1944 ====
Trathen conducted gunnery exercises in the Hawaiian area before departing Pearl Harbor on 23 January, bound for the Marshall Islands.

Entering Kwajalein lagoon on 2 February, Trathen relieved Schroeder (DD-501) off Kwajalein Island as a fire-support ship and shelled Japanese positions ashore until the fire control party could locate no further targets. On the 5th, Trathen joined McCord (DD-534) and cruisers Minneapolis (CA-36) and San Francisco (CA-38) off Gugegwe delivering support fire for the three battalions of marines, embarked in six LST's, as they swarmed ashore in LVT(A)s and 17 amphtrac vehicles, with 16 M4 Sherman tanks. At 0720, Trathen commenced fire with her main battery, sending 5-inch shells whistling shoreward. The destroyer and her consorts then stood by as the landing craft reached the beach.

Trathen continued to provide gunfire support until the Kwajalein operations ended on 7 February. The destroyer headed for Majuro on the 8th and arrived there the next day. On the 10th, Trathen returned to Kwajalein to conduct antisubmarine patrols.

Trathen next formed up with Indianapolis (CA-35) off Eniwetok. Based on an intelligence report that the island was unoccupied, the American warships carried out relatively light bombardment. In the meantime, analysis of papers captured at Kwajalein revealed that Eniwetok was, in fact, defended by tough, crack Japanese troops.

Too late for a radical change of plans, Indianapolis and near-sister Portland (CA-33), accompanied by Trathen and Hoel (DD-533), stationed themselves on the flanks of the LCI(G)'s, with waves of LVT's in the middle. Trathen screened the former cruiser while Hoel drew the latter, and the ships joined the gunboats (LCI(G)) in firing on the island.

Eniwetok soon fell to the mailed fist of American land and sea power. Trathen furnished fire support intermittently until the 29th of the month and thereafter remained at Eniwetok until 4 March when she headed for Majuro for a tender availability. Then, following exercises at Purvis Bay in the Solomon Islands and patrol duty between the Emirau and New Hanover Islands, Trathen subsequently joined the 7th Fleet on 3 May.

The destroyer departed Manus, in the Admiralty Islands, on 15 May in company with TF 74 and 75, bound for New Guinea waters. The target island, Wakde—occupied in 1942 by the Japanese—possessed an excellent airstrip and vital facilities which would be immensely useful to the Allies as they "island-hopped" closer to the Philippines and Japan. Arriving on the 17th, Trathen provided gunfire support for the force which landed on Wakde and later operated off the coast supporting the operation until the 25th, when the ship sailed for Biak Island.

The next target on the Navy's timetable, this island—the largest of the Schouten Islands group—lay fringed with coral reefs. The attack force scheduled to bombard the island arrived off the landing beaches 15 minutes ahead of schedule; and, at 0629 on the morning of 27 May, the 6-inch guns of cruisers Phoenix (CL-46), Boise (CL-47), and Nashville (CL-43) began lobbing the first of 1,000 rounds of shells shoreward, while the destroyers looked for "game" along the landing beaches—such as small Japanese patrol craft.

At 1100, four Japanese fighters made half-hearted passes over the airstrips on Biak. Two fighter-bombers came over late in the afternoon shortly thereafter followed by four twin-engined planes—three of which were destroyed by antiaircraft fire. The fourth was damaged. Trathen remained on patrol station off the Schoetens until 31 May, when she retired to Humboldt Bay to rejoin TF 75.

The Japanese' first reinforcement attempt towards Biak had been detected, and the Nipponese had turned back. On 3 June, as the enemy was retreating, TF 74 and 75 received orders to go after the fleeing Japanese. At 23:18 on 3 June, Trathen got underway with the other units of Destroyer Division (DesDiv) 48 and gave chase. The next day, 10 Japanese Aichi D3A "Val" dive bombers tried to pounce on the American force but were driven off. On the 5th, Japanese torpedo bombers attacked American forces, and one of them fell to Trathen's heavy antiaircraft fire.

Subsequently, the enemy launched a second effort aimed at reinforcing their beleaguered outpost on Biak. Six Japanese destroyers—three with troops embarked and three towing landing barges—joined cruisers Aoba and Kinu north of Misool Island, west of the "parrot beak" of New Guinea. The enemy force was under Rear Admiral Naomasa Sakonju in destroyer Shikinami. Proceeding towards Biak, the Japanese reinforcement group remained undetected until 10 B-25 Mitchells, escorted by P-38 Lightnings, spotted them and launched a devastating attack which sank Harusame and damaged three of her sister destroyers. Resuming the run to Biak once the planes had departed, the Japanese continued on an unknowing collision course with Vice Admiral V.A.C. Crutchley's cruisers and destroyers prowling between Biak and Hollandia.

Unaware of Sakonju's position, Crutchley decided to commence a sweep parallel to the coast of Biak. About 2200 on the night of 8 June, a PB4Y bomber on night patrol, detected the Nipponese force and reported five unidentified ships making 12 knots in the direction of Crutchley's cruisers and destroyers. Deploying for battle on a northerly course, the British Admiral ordered his ships to general quarters. The Japanese simultaneously detected the American's presence and turned to fire torpedo spreads before retiring.

Trathen, in DesDiv 48, followed astern of DesDivs 42 and 47, under orders from Crutchley to pursue the fleeing enemy. Then, while the two divisions charged ahead on the heels of the retreating Nipponese, Trathen and her division mates fell back on orders to screen Crutchley's cruisers.

The American force never caught up with the enemy and returned to Humboldt Bay on the following day. Trathen subsequently participated in the invasion of Noemfoor Island. Assigned to TG 77.2, the covering force, she conducted shore bombardment missions there on 2 July before retiring to Humboldt Bay. She later served in the covering forces during the landings at Cape Sansapor, New Guinea, on 30 July, laying smoke screens and patrolling 25 miles off shoreline to cover the invasion.

Recreation and availability at Sydney, Australia, from 13 to 20 August, provided Trathen's officers and men with a welcome respite from the toils of war. Heading back north after a week of Australian hospitality, the destroyer conducted exercises and drills in the vicinity of Purvis Bay in preparation for the Western Carolines Operation. On 6 September, she departed from Purvis Bay as part of TG 32.5. After screening the carriers as they launched devastating air strikes in support of the Palau invasion, the destroyer retired on 26 September to refuel and replenish depleted ammunition stocks in Kossol Passage.

With the dissolution of her task, the destroyer headed for Manus and arrived there on 2 October. Next assigned to TG 77.4, Trathen set her course towards Leyte Gulf in the Philippine Islands. Landings on Dinagat and Suluan Islands in the entrance to Leyte Gulf commenced on the 17th; and the destroyer stood by to provide antiaircraft and gunfire support. Three days later, three Japanese fighters roared low over the area which Trathen was guarding. Within minutes, the ship's gunners splashed their second plane of the war; and the destroyer even managed to capture the aircraft's pilot whom they transferred to carrier Sangamon (CVE-26).

Again on the 24th, Japanese aircraft harassed the ships of the invasion force, and the alert combat air patrol (CAP) downed two more of the enemy. Trathen retired to Manus early in November but returned to Leyte Gulf on the 16th for patrols in Surigao Strait. Relieving Sigourney (DD-643) on the 19th, Trathen remained in the Philippines until the 23d when she headed to the Western Carolines. After sinking a medium barge with 5-inch and 40-millimeter fire en route, she reached Ulithi on 25 November.

Exercises off Ulithi occupied the ship from 30 November to 29 December before Trathen joined TG 38.2 on 5 January 1945. She served as plane guard and screening vessel for this group and TG 38.5 through the end of the month. The former group participated in preinvasion strikes on the island of Luzon before turning to the South China Sea for a series of strikes on Japanese-held Taiwan from 9 to 11 January. The French Indochina coast next received its share of attention, with Japanese shipping and coastal installations feeling the might of the American naval air arm. Then, moving northward against virtually no opposition from Japanese planes or ships, the task group aircraft bombed Hong Kong and Hainan Island. Monsoon and typhoon-type winds and seas buffeted the group on the 17th and 18th, with Trathen's inclinometer registering a staggering 67 degrees from the vertical at the height of the storm.

==== 1945 ====
After leaving the South China Sea through the Balintang Channel, Trathen and her mates participated in more strikes against Taiwan and in raids on Sakishima Gunto which served Japan as a staging area for the kamikazes. In the course of her plane-guarding duties, Trathen steamed astern of Hancock (CV-19) on 21 January and witnessed the detonation of a Grumman TBF Avenger as it landed hard on the flight deck. One man was blown overboard by the explosion, but Trathen soon fished him from the water.

Following the strikes on Okinawa, Trathen got underway from Ulithi on 10 February to support carrier operations between Iwo Jima and the Japanese home islands. Six days later, TF 58 commenced the first strikes against Tokyo launched from 150 miles south east of the Imperial city. After a night retirement, the group conducted further strikes the next day. With the landings at Iwo Jima, Trathen arrived in the vicinity on the 20th and screened the carriers as they conducted air strikes for the next four days supporting the American marines fighting for that fanatically defended island.

The force swept north with Trathen in its screen and arrived at a point off Tokyo at dawn on the 25th to launch strikes to hit the Japanese capital again. That night, the carriers steamed in the direction of Nagoya, but heavy weather cancelled the strikes scheduled to be launched against that industrial city on the 26th. While in Japanese waters, Trathen and her division mates sighted a number of floating mines. The destroyer herself sank one with gun fire on 27 February.

Following availability at Ulithi, Trathen returned to the "front lines" on 14 March, rendezvousing with TG 58.4 in preparations for air strikes on the Japanese home islands and on Okinawa. Temporarily detached to pick up a downed pilot, the destroyer rejoined the group as it plowed on towards Japan. She later sank several more floating mines while screening the carriers against air attacks. Slashing through CAP and antiaircraft fire, some kamikazes managed to crash into their targets and give their lives for the Emperor. Antiaircraft fire from Trathen's group accounted for five of the winged marauders, but one hit Intrepid (CV-11) on 18 March.

Nine days later, Trathen, in company with battle cruisers Guam (CB-2) and Alaska (CB-1), cruisers Flint (CL-97) and San Diego (CL-53) and four other destroyers left the carriers to bombard Minamidaitōjima. All ships shelled the target area with impunity. The battlecruisers, light cruisers, and destroyers rejoined the carriers on 28 March and resumed their screening duties.

In the months that followed, American forces—aided by the small British Far East Fleet—continued hammering at the Japanese homeland with air strikes and bombardments by surface ships. On 11 April, still attached to TF 58, Trathen hammered away at attacking Japanese planes with her antiaircraft batteries. During the third raid that day, a 5-inch shell from a "friendly" ship hit the destroyer near her number five 5-inch mount handling room. It killed three men, wounded 21, and rendered the after mount inoperative.

Tender availability soon made good the damage, and Trathen returned to the Fleet. Departing Ulithi on 3 May, she rejoined TF 58 on the 5th near Okinawa. Six days later, Bunker Hill (CV-17), flagship of TF 58, was hit by a kamikaze. Another Japanese pilot, with similar intentions for Trathen, dived toward the destroyer. While the ship's guns hammered at the suicide plane, help came from the air. A "friendly" fighter, braving the antiaircraft fire from his own ships, also attacked the kamikaze which crashed into the sea off Trathen's port bow.

Anchoring in Ulithi lagoon for a needed rest, Trathen got underway again 10 days later and sortied with TG 58.4 to screen the carrier.

On 4 June, air operations were cancelled as the barometer began to plummet. The storm center of a typhoon passed some 70 miles to the southeast, and the ships in company with Trathen emerged unscathed from the fringes of the storm. On 6 June, while carrying out plane-guard duties, the destroyer rescued the two-man crew of a downed SB2C Helldiver. She recovered both men, but the pilot was dead when he was brought on board.

These operations proved to be Trathen's last of World War II, for she soon departed Leyte to begin the long voyage back to the United States. After a stop at Pearl Harbor, Trathen arrived at Seattle, Washington, on 9 July 1945, for an overhaul at the Todd Shipbuilding Co. While the destroyer was in the shipyard, the war in the Pacific ended. Upon completion of the refit, the ship sailed for San Diego on 29 September and arrived there on 2 October. On 18 January 1946, Trathen was decommissioned and berthed with the San Diego Group, Pacific Reserve Fleet.

=== Post-World War II ===
When North Korean forces swept southward across the 38th parallel on 25 June 1950, the United States soon came to the aid of the embattled South Koreans. Called out of reserve service on 14 June 1951, Trathen was recommissioned on 1 August. As flagship of Destroyer Squadron (DesRon) 28, the ship was transferred to the Atlantic Fleet on 5 October, based at Norfolk, Virginia, and operated off the east coast and in the Caribbean through the end of 1952.

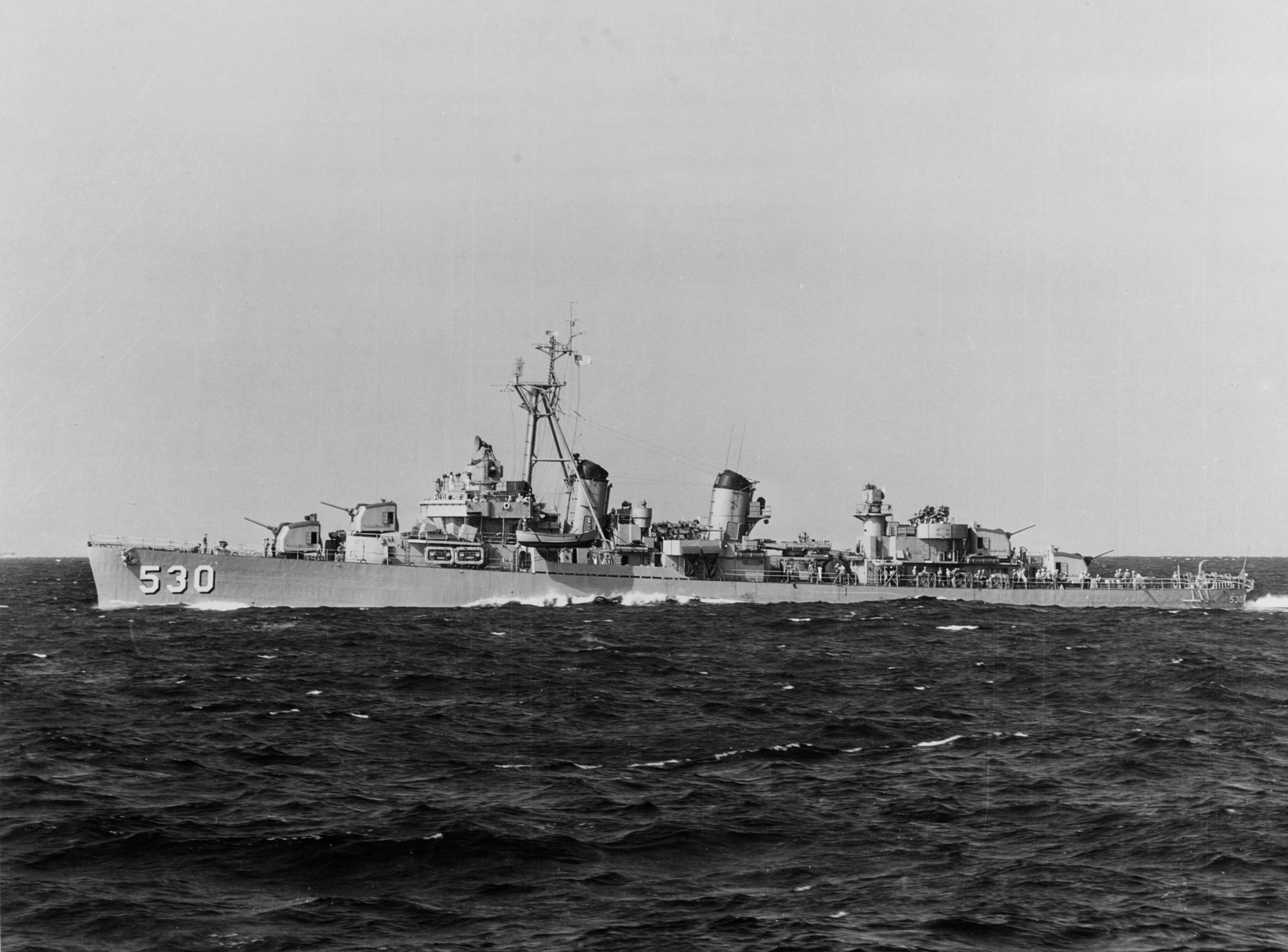
Trathen at sea on 3 September 1952.

Subsequently ordered to the Far East, Trathen arrived at Sasebo, Japan, on 12 February 1953. During her Korean deployment, Trathen's main and secondary batteries pounded railroad lines, trains, bunkers, and transformer stations. On 11 March, the destroyer joined the "Train Buster Club" when she destroyed a railroad train. Two days later, after the ship completed her patrols between Wonsan and Hungnam, she was relieved on station to return to Sasebo for repairs. Later becoming a part of TF 77, Trathen continued on duty until 7 June. She departed Sasebo on the following day, bound for Hong Kong.

Returning to the United States via Southeast Asia and the Mediterranean, Trathen operated with the Atlantic Fleet until January 1955, when she was transferred back to the Pacific Fleet and subsequently deployed to the Western Pacific (WestPac). On 21 April, Trathen departed Long Beach, California to begin successive WestPac deployments which would last through 1964, interspersed with tours of duty on the west coast. When in the Orient, she followed a varied itinerary visiting such ports as Kaohsiung, Taiwan; Hong Kong; Sasebo and Yokosuka, Japan; as well as Pearl Harbor, Guam, Midway, and Subic Bay. During this period, she took part in antisubmarine, antiaircraft, and other exercises; served as plane guard when operating with fast carrier forces, and patrolled the Taiwan Strait as part of American forces protecting that island.

While Trathen was at Kaohsiung during her last deployment to WestPac, word arrived early in August of the Gulf of Tonkin Incident. Getting underway shortly thereafter, Trathen operated at sea throughout the remainder of the month but for brief replenishments at Kaohsiung. Relieved on station, Trathen sailed for Hong Kong to serve as station ship before traveling to the South China Sea to support naval operations off the coast of the Republic of Vietnam. On 8 October 1964, the destroyer departed for eastern waters and proceeded via Guam and Midway to the west coast.

=== Fate ===
After arriving at Long Beach on 28 October, the destroyer conducted routine carrier operations off the west coast. On 12 February 1965, Trathen reported to the Commander, San Diego Group, Pacific Reserve Fleet, to begin her second inactivation period at the Todd Shipyard, San Pedro, California. On 15 March, she made her final voyage at the end of a towline. Brought to San Diego, she completed the process of deactivation and was decommissioned on 11 May 1965 and placed in reserve. A survey of the ship conducted in June 1972 reported that the costs of modernization to Trathen would be disproportionate to the value of the ship. Accordingly, Trathen was struck from the Naval Vessel Register on 1 November 1972 and scrapped.

== Honors ==
Trathen received eight battle stars for World War II service and two for Korean War service.
