= After Midnight =

After Midnight may refer to:

== Film ==
- After Midnight (1921 film), an American film directed by Ralph Ince
- After Midnight (1927 film), an American silent film starring Norma Shearer
- After Midnight (1938 film), a German film directed by Carl Hoffmann
- After Midnight (1989 film), an American horror anthology film
- After Midnight (1990 film), a film starring Hayley Mills
- After Midnight (2004 film), an Italian romantic comedy film (Italian: Dopo mezzanotte)
- After Midnight (2014 film), an American mystery thriller film directed by Fred Olen Ray
- After Midnight (2019 film), an American romantic monster movie directed by Jeremy Gardner and Christian Stella

== Literature ==
- After Midnight (Keun novel), 1937 book by Irmgard Keun (German: Nach Mitternacht)
- After Midnight (Albrand novel), a 1948 novel by Martha Albrand

== Music ==
- After Midnight (musical), a 2013 Broadway musical

=== Albums ===
- After Midnight (Nat King Cole album), 1957
- After Midnight (The Manhattans album), 1980
- After Midnight (The Seldom Scene album), 1981
- After Midnight (Janie Fricke album), 1987
- After Midnight: Kean College, 2/28/80, a 2004 album by the Jerry Garcia Band

=== Songs ===
- "After Midnight" (J. J. Cale song), 1966, also covered by various other artists
- "After Midnight" (Blink-182 song), 2011
- "After Midnight", by Jake Owen from American Love, 2016
- "After Midnight", by Phoenix from Alpha Zulu, 2022
- "After Midnight" (Chappell Roan song), 2023

== Other uses ==
- After Midnight (TV series), an American late night celebrity game show hosted by Taylor Tomlinson
- After Midnight, an 1980s alternative music show that aired on KMUW
- After Midnight (adventure), for the role-playing game Marvel Super Heroes

== See also ==
- After Midnight Project, an American rock band
- After Midnight with Boston Blackie, 1943 film
- "Walkin' After Midnight," 1957 song
- Before Midnight (disambiguation)
- At Midnight (disambiguation)
- Midnight (disambiguation)
