= Tor Miller =

American singer-songwriter

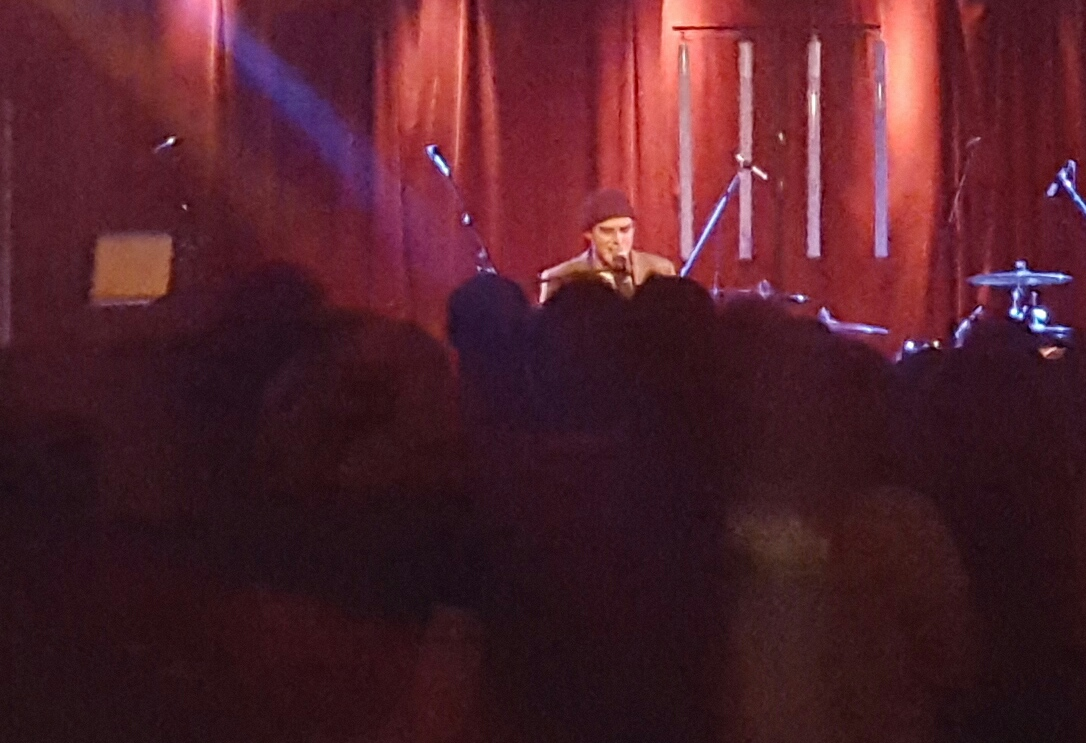
- Tor Miller performing

Background information
- Born: Tor Albert Miller; February 7, 1994 (age 32)
- Origin: Brooklyn, New York City
- Genre: Indie pop
- Years active: 2013–present
- Label: Glassnote
- Website: www.tormiller.com

Tor Albert Miller (born February 7, 1994) is an indie pop singer from Brooklyn, New York City.

== History ==
Originally from Brooklyn, New York, Miller moved with his mother to New Jersey after a brief separation of his parents, although his school was still located in the city. To counter the boredom during the long drive, Miller's mother gave him albums to listen to during the commute, including David Bowie, Elton John and Fleetwood Mac, which sparked his interest in music. "Ziggy Stardust, Elton John’s Greatest Hits, and Rumours by Fleetwood Mac, so I just listened to those non-stop, back and forth, all the time."

He started to play piano after his parents set up a lesson with a piano teacher who he said was, "a laid-back New Jersey wedding singer". From there, Miller started to develop singing and writing songs. During his high school, he started a pop punk band. When he was 18 years old, Tor Miller went to New York University, specifically Clive Davis School of Recorded Music. He also spent his weekends playing piano at places such as Rockwood Music Hall, The Bitter End, and the burlesque bar, Slipper Room in the East Village.

Miller was signed to the independent label, Glassnote Records in early 2014 and subsequently dropped out from NYU due to scheduling problems (especially since he played music in a number of NYC venues). His debut EP, Headlights EP, containing four songs that includes the positively reviewed "Midnight" was released in February 2015. His debut album American English, was released on September 30, 2016.

Following the release of his second album Surviving The Suburbs, Miller became an independent artist and released his third album, Generation of Me on June 9, 2022. He currently manages trans hyperpop artist Mel 4Ever.

== Discography ==
=== Albums ===
Year	Album details
2022	Generation of Me: Released: 9 June 2022

Year	Album details
2018	Surviving The Suburbs: Released: 21 September 2018; Label: Glassnote Records

Year	Album details
2016	American English: Released: 30 September 2016; Label: Glassnote Records

=== EPs ===
Year	Album details
2015	Headlights EP: Released: 2 February 2015; Label: Glassnote Records
