= The Midnight Man =

The Midnight Man or Midnight Man may refer to:

== Film and television ==
- The Midnight Man (1917 film), a 1917 film starring Jack Mulhall
- The Midnight Man (1919 film), a 1919 film starring James J. Corbett
- The Midnight Man (1974 film), a 1974 film starring Burt Lancaster
- Midnight Man (1995 film), a 1995 film starring Lorenzo Lamas
- Midnight Man, a 1997 television film starring Rob Lowe, based on the 1992 novel Eye of the Storm by Jack Higgins
- "Midnight Man", Blue Murder (Canadian) season 4, episode 6 (2004)
- Midnight Man (British serial), a 2008 British television serial starring James Nesbitt
- The Midnight Man (2016 crime film), a 2016 crime film
- The Midnight Man (2016 horror film), a 2016 film starring Robert Englund and Lin Shaye

== Literature ==
- Midnight Man, a 1981 novel by Warren Murphy and Richard Sapir; the 43th installment in The Destroyer novel series
- The Midnight Man, a 1982 novel by Loren D. Estleman; the third installment in the Amos Walker series
- Midnight Man, a 1993 novel by Barbara Faith
- The Midnight Man, a 1998 picture book by Berlie Doherty
- The Midnight Man, a 2000 short story collection by Stephen Laws
- The Midnight Man, a 2008 novel by Simon Clark
- The Midnight Man, a 2012 novel by Paul C. Doherty; the seventh installment of the Canterbury Tales series
- The Midnight Man, a 2021 novel by Caroline Mitchell; book one of the Slayton thrillers

== Music ==
- Midnight Man (album), a 1966 album by Davey Graham
- "Midnight Man", a 1985 single by Flash and the Pan
- "Midnight Man" (Sandra song), 1987
- "Midnight Man" (Nick Cave and the Bad Seeds song), 2008
- "Midnight Man", a song by the James Gang from the 1971 album Thirds

== Comics ==
- Midnight Man (comics), a Marvel Comics character
