= USS Martin (DE-30) =

Evarts-class destroyer escort

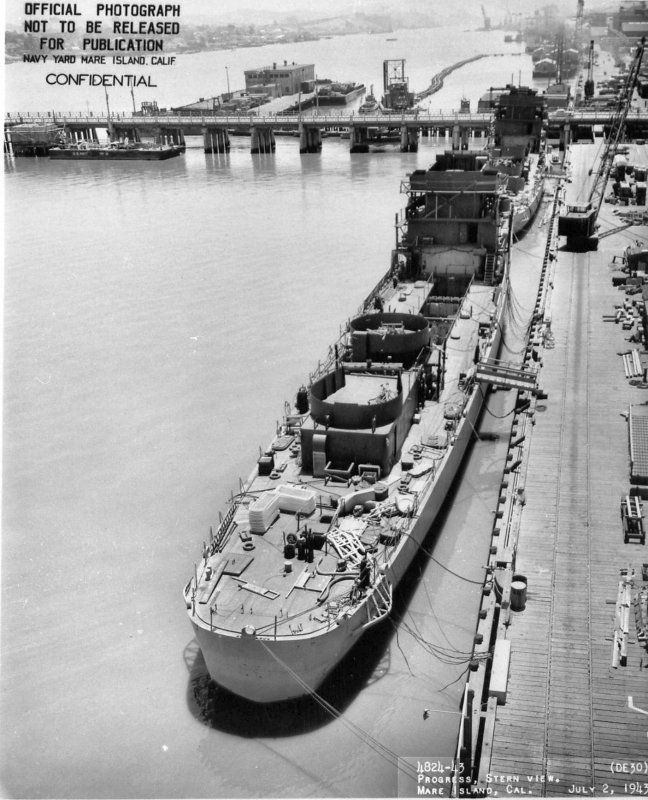
- USS Martin (DE-30) fitting out at Mare Island Naval Shipyard on 2 July 1943

History

United States
- Name: USS Martin
- Builder: Mare Island Navy Yard
- Laid down: 26 November 1942
- Launched: 18 May 1943
- Commissioned: 4 September 1943
- Decommissioned: 19 November 1945
- Stricken: 5 December 1945
- Fate: Sold for scrapping, 15 May 1946

General characteristics
- Type: Evarts-class destroyer escort
- Displacement: 1,140 long tons (1,158 t) standard; 1,430 long tons (1,453 t) full
- Length: 289 ft 5 in (88.21 m) o/a; 283 ft 6 in (86.41 m) w/l
- Beam: 35 ft (11 m)
- Draft: 11 ft (3.4 m) (max)
- Propulsion: 4 × General Motors Model 16-278A diesel engines with electric drive, 6,000 shp (4,474 kW); 2 screws
- Speed: 19 knots (35 km/h; 22 mph)
- Range: 4,150 nmi (7,690 km)
- Complement: 15 officers and 183 enlisted
- Armament: 3 × single 3"/50 Mk.22 dual purpose guns; 1 × quad 1.1"/75 Mk.2 AA gun; 9 × 20 mm Mk.4 AA guns; 1 × Hedgehog Projector Mk.10 (144 rounds); 8 × Mk.6 depth charge projectors; 2 × Mk.9 depth charge tracks

USS Martin (DE-30) was an Evarts-class destroyer escort constructed for the United States Navy during World War II. The ship was promptly sent off into the Pacific Ocean to protect convoys and other ships from Japanese submarines and fighter aircraft. The vessel entered service in 1943 and spent its entire career in the Pacific Ocean. Following the surrender of Japan, Martin returned to the United States and by the end of 1945, was slated for scrapping, which began in 1946.

== Design ==
The Evarts-class destroyer escorts were 289 ft 5 in (88.21 m) long overall, and they had a beam of 35 ft 2 in (10.72 m). They had an average draft of 10 ft 1 in (3.07 m) at their full load displacement of 1,416 long tons (1,439 t). Each ship had a normal crew numbered 156 officers and sailors.

Martin was propelled by a pair of diesel motors manufactured by General Motors, which drove a pair of screw propellers. Her propulsion system was rated to produce 6,000 brake horsepower (4,500 kW) for a top speed of 19.5 knots (36.1 km/h; 22.4 mph). Oil storage amounted to between 131 and 197 long tons (133 and 200 t), which allowed a cruising radius of up to 6,000 nautical miles (11,000 km; 6,900 mi) at an economical pace of 10 knots (19 km/h; 12 mph).

The ship's armament consisted of a main battery of three 3-inch (76 mm) /50-caliber guns in individual pivot mounts, which could be used against air or surface targets. These were supported by a light anti-aircraft battery that initially consisted of four 1.1 in (28 mm) /75-caliber guns in a quadruple mount and nine 20 mm (0.79 in) Oerlikon guns. For attacks against submarines, the ship was equipped with a Hedgehog mortar, eight depth charge throwers, and two depth charge racks.

== Service history ==
Originally intended for lend-lease to Great Britain, USS Martin (DE-30) was laid down as BDE-30 by Mare Island Navy Yard, Vallejo, California, on 26 November 1942. The ship was launched on 18 May 1943, redesignated DE-30, on 16 June 1943 and renamed Martin on 23 June 1943, after Luther Martin, who was killed at the Battle of Savo Island on 9 August 1942. The destroyer escort was commissioned on 4 September 1943.

Assigned to the U.S. Pacific Fleet, Martin escorted the battleship USS Idaho to San Diego, California, on 29 September to 2 October. After shakedown off San Diego, the escort ship got underway in convoy for Pearl Harbor on 11 November, arriving 21 November for service with TF 16. On 3 December, in company with USS Trathen and SS Mormacport, she steamed for the Ellice / Gilbert Islands area, returning to Pearl Harbor on 31 December.

On 9 January 1944 Martin sailed with TG 58.4 for escort service during the initial Marshall operations, on 11 January into late February. From arrival at Tulagi on 18 March until 1 October she operated as a merchant ship escort in the Solomons.

During October the ship joined TG 30.8 to escort fueling units during the strikes on Formosa; Luzon, Philippines; and Okinawa, Ryūkyūs, beginning on 10 October. From November to February 1945 she patrolled the western Carolines and Marianas. On 10 December 1944 Martin screened LSTs landing troops and supplies on Leyte for the mop-up operations following the landings in October and the ensuing Battle for Leyte Gulf. She operated out of Eniwetok from February 1945 on, escorting convoys to Kwajalein and Guam, Marshalls, and Ulithi, Carolines.

On 5 July Martin departed Kwajalein for the west coast, via Pearl Harbor, arriving at San Francisco, California, on 19 July. On 19 November she decommissioned at Mare Island Navy Yard and was struck from the Navy List on 5 December. Martin was sold to Wilmington Transportation Co., Wilmington, Los Angeles, on 15 May, and delivered on 3 June 1946 to be scrapped.

== Awards ==
- American Campaign Medal
- Asiatic-Pacific Campaign Medal
- World War II Victory Medal
