= SS Midnight =

SS Midnight may refer to one of two Type C2-S-AJ1 ships built by North Carolina Shipbuilding for the United States Maritime Commission during World War II:

- SS Midnight (1943), launched 10 December 1943; renamed Pacific Bear (1947), Lanikai (1958), Pacific Bear (1960), Panoceanic Faith (1961); foundered 870 nautical miles (1,610 km) southwest of Kodiak Island on 9 October 1967 with the loss of 35
- SS Midnight (1944), launched 14 April 1944; transferred to the United States Navy as Mount Hood-class ammunition ship USS Wrangell (AE-12); scrapped in 1983

== See also ==
- Midnight (disambiguation)#Ships for other ships
