= Midnite =

Midnite is an alternative spelling of midnight.

Midnite may also refer to:

== Music ==
- Midnite (band), a roots reggae band from the U.S. Virgin Islands
- Midnite, a 2013 album by Salmo
- "Midnite", a 2002 song by Brent Jones & TP Mobb featuring Coko

== Books ==
- Midnite: The Story of a Wild Colonial Boy, a 1967 children's book by Randolph Stow

== Other uses ==
- Midnite Software Gazette, later merged into .info magazine
- Doctor Mid-Nite, also Doctor Midnight, the name of several superheroes in DC Comics
- Papa Midnite, a DC and Vertigo Comics character in Hellblazer
- Tony Midnite (1926–2009), American performer and activist

== See also ==
- Midnight (disambiguation)
