= Lola Rose =

2003 novel by Jacqueline Wilson

- Author: Jacqueline Wilson
- Illustrator: Nick Sharratt
- Language: English
- Genre: Children's novel
- Publisher: Doubleday (first edition, hardback)
- Publication date: 2003
- Publication place: United Kingdom
- Media type: Print (hardback & paperback) and audiobook
- Pages: 323 pages (not including extras )
- Preceded by: Secrets
- Followed by: Midnight

Lola Rose is a children's novel by Jacqueline Wilson, first published in 2003. It revolves around the life of a young girl called Jayni Fenton who runs away to London with her mother Nikki and younger brother Kenny, after her father physically abuses her mother and, eventually, Jayni herself. The family adopt new names to help prevent their father tracing them. Mum becomes Victoria Luck, Kenny becomes Kendall Luck (as it is easy for him to remember) and Jayni becomes Lola Rose Luck. The story deals with the issues of domestic abuse, child abuse and breast cancer.

== Plot summary ==
In the beginning, Jayni's mother, Nikki Fenton, wins £10,000 lottery money on a scratchcard. They decide to not tell Jayni's father, Jay, who they fear will spend it on his friends on drinks at the pub or losing it by going to a betting shop. However, Nikki decides to tell Jay anyway because he reveals he has left his job and is joining a mini-cab firm but needs to provide the car. Jay, Nikki, Jayni and her little brother, Kenny, go out to T.G.I. Friday's and spend a lot of money on an elaborate meal and drinks. Jayni fears for herself because as Nikki and Jay "drank lots" it would almost always "end in a fight". Jay gets angry at Nikki for becoming drunk and when they return home, he starts shouting at her. As Jay goes to hit Nikki, she tells Jay to let her put the kids to bed first. However Jayni refuses to go to bed and as a result, Jay gets angry and hits both Jayni and Nikki, he then leaves the house. This is the last straw for Nikki. She had previously put up with the violent nature from her husband, but now he had turned to violence against Jayni, Nikki felt they had to leave.

Nikki and the children run away to London and decide to change their names in order to prevent Jay from tracking them down. To prevent Jay from tracking them down, they decide to change their identities – Nikki becomes Victoria, Jayni becomes Lola Rose and Kenny becomes Kendall (as it is easy for him to remember.) They take the surname Luck because Nikki had signed her name as "Lady Luck" when they check into a hotel.

The family stays in hotels until they start running out of money, at which point they rent cheap accommodation. Both children begin attending the local school. One night, Nikki goes to the pub to buy a packet of cigarettes from the machine, and does not return home until after midnight, but consolingly she has found a new job (bar work), which means working set afternoons, and evenings if she is needed. She begins to fall in love with an art student named Jake. Jayni doesn't like him. She is also jealous because Kenny prefers Jake to her. One day, Nikki and Jake argue over the problem of Nikki finding a lump in her breast. Jake reveals that his mother was in the same situation and ignored what turned out to be breast cancer. He subsequently moves out because Nikki has run out of money (they also argued a lot). She has to go to hospital, but believing she will be back the next day, she leaves only a day's food and a little money. The children soon run out of money and food, but are unable to ask anyone for help because Jayni fears them being taken into care (although Andy and Steve, her neighbours give them some food, after Jayni makes an excuse). Jayni finds out where her mother's sister Barbara lives, and telephones her. Nikki had been estranged from her family due to an incident many years previously where she ran away with Barbara's then-fiancé, Michael (in the last chapter of the story, Barbara reveals that she didn't mind because she "always knew exactly what he was going to say"). Jayni is worried that Barbara may not want to speak to them; but Barbara comes to stay at once, and provides the children with food.

Nikki comes out of hospital and telephones Jay for help, believing that he won't be violent any more once he learns how ill she's been. Jay comes to their flat and is nice at first though he doesn't want Lola Rose any more because he thinks it's her fault that Nikki chose to leave him. He then finds a pair of Jake's boxer shorts and is about to attack Nikki for having an affair with another man. Barbara, a practitioner of Thai boxing, fights him off and sends him away from the house; warning him never to come back again. Jayni, Nikki and Kenny feel safe with the protection of Barbara. She asks whether they would like to come to her pub so that they could live together, stating her plans to renovate the pub and start a karaoke act with Nikki, also deciding on what to name their pub again.

Nikki becomes very ill and develops a fever, so she has to go back to hospital, although she hates it. Jayni remembers children's stories in which the hero has to perform a terrifying but menial task. She envisions that to get her mother better she has to stand by the shark tank and count sixty seconds, sixty times (she is terrified of sharks). This she does. An aquarium worker sees this and says she must be a shark enthusiast and gives her a shark tooth. Then, eventually Nikki gets better and returns home. Jayni knows it has nothing to do with the tooth but it is comforting. Jayni then decides that she'll stay Lola Rose, and hopes that her mother gets completely better, so that they live happily ever after, with Auntie Barbara, in her pub.
