= Round Midnight =

Round Midnight or 'Round Midnight may refer to:

- "'Round Midnight" (song), a 1944 jazz song by pianist Thelonious Monk
- 'Round Midnight (1963 Betty Carter album)
- 'Round Midnight (Kenny Burrell album), 1972
- Round Midnight (1975 Betty Carter album)
- Round Midnight, a British radio show, hosted by Brian Matthew, that ran on BBC Radio 2 from 1978 to 1990
- Round Midnight (Philly Joe Jones album), 1980
- Round Midnight (film), a 1986 film by Bertrand Tavernier
- Round Midnight (soundtrack), the soundtrack to the 1986 film by Bertrand Tavernier
- Round Midnight (Elkie Brooks album), 1993
- Round Midnight (Time-Life album), a 2008 R&B compilation album

== See also ==
- 'Round About Midnight, a 1956 jazz album by Miles Davis
- Around Midnight, a 1960 album by Julie London
