= Before Midnight (disambiguation) =

Before Midnight is a 2013 romantic drama film.

Before Midnight may also refer to:

- Before Midnight (novel), published in 1955 by American author Rex Stout
- Before Midnight (1925 film)
- Before Midnight (1933 film), a film starring Ralph Bellamy

== See also ==
- After Midnight (disambiguation)
- At Midnight (disambiguation)
