= Midnight Sun (disambiguation) =

Midnight sun is a natural phenomenon that occurs when the Sun remains visible at the local midnight.

Midnight Sun may also refer to:

== Arts and entertainment ==
=== Literature ===
- Midnight Sun (Meyer novel), a book by Stephenie Meyer
- Midnight Sun (graphic novel), a graphic novel by Ben Towle
- Midnight Sun (character), a supervillain in the Marvel Comics universe
- Midnight Sun, a novel by Ramsey Campbell
- Midnight's Sun – A Story of Wolves, a Garry Kilworth novel
- Midnight Sun, a novel by Jo Nesbø

=== Music ===
- Midnight Sun (band), a Swedish heavy metal band

==== Albums ====
- Midnight Sun (Aimer album), 2014
- The Midnight Sun (C Duncan album), 2016
- Midnight Sun (The Choirboys album), and the title track
- Midnight Sun (Dee Dee Bridgewater album), 2011
- Midnight Sun (GOASTT album), a 2014 album by The Ghost of a Saber Tooth Tiger
- Midnight Sun (Herb Alpert album), 1992
- The Midnight Sun (Jack McDuff album), 1968
- Midnight Sun (Lou Donaldson album), recorded in 1960, released in 1980
- Midnight Sun (Redgum album), 1986, and the title track
- Midnight Sun (Zara Larsson album), 2025, and the title track (see below)
- Midnight Sun (Beast EP), 2012
- Midnight Sun (JO1 EP), 2022
- Midnight Sun, a 1993 album by Maggie Reilly
- Midnight Sun, a 1983 album by Sir Douglas Quintet
- Midnight Sun, album by William Galison

==== Songs ====
- "Midnight Sun" (Elena song), 2010
- "Midnight Sun" (Lionel Hampton and Sonny Burke song), 1947
- "Midnight Sun" (Zara Larsson song), 2025
- "Midnight Sun", a song by AFI from Black Sails in the Sunset
- "Midnight Sun", a song by Asia from Alpha
- "Midnight Sun", a song by Badfinger from Magic Christian Music
- "Midnight Sun", a song by Calexico and Iron & Wine from Years to Burn
- "Midnight Sun", a song by Deine Lakaien from April Skies
- "Midnight Sun", a song by Duran Duran from Medazzaland
- "Midnight Sun", a song by F.Cuz from Gorgeous
- "Midnight Sun", a song by Garth Brooks from The Ultimate Hits
- "Midnight Sun", a song by Helloween from Better Than Raw
- "Midnight Sun", a song by Ivy from Long Distance
- "Midnight Sun", a song by Mandroid Echostar from Coral Throne
- "Midnight Sun", a song by Nilüfer Yanya from Painless
- "Midnight Sun", a song by The Sounds from Crossing the Rubicon
- "Midnight Sun", a song by Kreator from Hate Über Alles

=== Theater, film and television ===
- Midnight Sun (ballet), a 1915 ballet by Léonide Massine
- The Midnight Sun (1926 film), an American silent drama film
- The Midnight Sun (1943 film), a French adventure film
- Midnight Sun (2006 film), a Japanese film starring Yui also called A Song to the Sun
- Midnight Sun (2014 film), a Canadian/Italian film
- Midnight Sun (2018 film), an American romance film
- Midnight Sun (2025 film), 태양의 노래 ("Taeyang-ui norae" literally translated as "Song to the Sun"), a 2025 South Korean remake of the 2006 Japanese Film
- "The Midnight Sun" (The Twilight Zone), a 1961 episode of Twilight Zone
- Midnattssol or Midnight Sun, a French/Swedish 2016 TV series
- Midnight Sun, a Cirque du Soleil performance held in Montreal in 2004
- Midnight Sun (musical), a 2021 South Korean musical
- Midnight Sun (白夜), a 2019 episode of Attack on Titan season 3

== Sports ==
- Midnight Sun Game, a baseball game played annually on the night of the summer solstice in Fairbanks, Alaska
- Tromsø Midnight Sun Marathon, Norway
- Midnight Sun Solar Race Team, a Canadian solar car race team

== Other uses ==
- Midnight Sun (horse), an influential Tennessee Walking Horse sire
- Marvel's Midnight Suns, a tactical role-playing game
- Midnight Sun Broadcasting Company, founded by Austin E. Lathrop

== See also ==
- The Midnight Sons, a fictional team of supernatural superheroes appearing in Marvel Comics
- The Midnight Sons, 1909 American musical comedy
- Midnight Son, 2011 American vampire horror film
- Land of the Midnight Sun (disambiguation)
- Midnattsol (modified spelling of the Norwegian word for 'midnight sun'), a German/Norwegian heavy metal band
- Midnight Sunshine, a 1984 studio album (featuring a song of the same name) from Kikki Danielsson
- "Midnight Sunrise", a song by Turisas
- Jewish law in the polar regions
- Midnight star (disambiguation)
- Midnight (disambiguation)
- Sun (disambiguation)
