= Midnight Star: Renegade =

2016 mobile video game

- Developer: Industrial Toys (iOS)
- Publisher: Industrial Toys
- Writer: John Scalzi
- Composer: Serj Tankian
- Engine: Unreal Engine 4
- Platform: iOS
- Release: August 11, 2016 (iOS)
- Genre: First-person shooter
- Modes: Single-player, Multiplayer

Midnight Star: Renegade is a science fiction mobile shooting game developed by Industrial Toys, the second game in the Midnight Star series. It was soft released in March 2016 for iOS devices. Set 120 years after the events of Midnight Star, the game takes players to new areas. It was released on iOS on 11 August 2016.

== Gameplay ==
Midnight Star: Renegade is a mobile sci-fi shooter that requires the player to complete combat missions and upgrade weapons in order to advance through the game. The gameplay includes crafting rifles and pistols that shoot bullets, electricity or rockets and there are many other combinations when creating weapons.

== Plot ==
The story is told via emails received at the end of each level.

== Reception ==
Touch Arcade says that it is "a pretty brilliant kind of way to design a first-person shooter". Pocket Gamer says it is a streamlined version of Midnight Star, and it is a lesser game because of it; the objectives, enemies, and locations are repetitive, and the controls are more clumsy and cumbersome, since, in addition to aiming your weapon, the player needs to swipe in order to move in a direction (its predecessor moved the player on rails).
