= Midnight Hour =

Midnight Hour may refer to:

- The midnight hour, the transition time from one day to the next
- The Midnight Hour, a 1985 comedy horror TV film
- The Midnight Hour (album), a 2018 album by Ali Shaheed Muhammad and Adrian Younge
- The Midnite Hour, a 1992 album by Jamie Principle
- "The Midnight Hour", a 1952 song by Ray Charles
- "Midnight Hour", a 2010 song by Reflection Eternal, single from Revolutions per Minute
- "Midnight Hour", a song on C. C. Catch album Hear What I Say
- "Midnight Hour" (Skrillex, Boys Noize and Ty Dolla Sign song), 2019
- Midnight Hour (EP), by Alesso and Liam Payne, 2020

== See also ==
- "In the Midnight Hour", a 1965 song by Wilson Pickett and soul standard
- In the Mid-Nite Hour, a 2005 album by Warren G
- "In the Midnight Hour" (Grey's Anatomy), a 2008 episode of Grey's Anatomy
- This Midnight Hour, a composition by Anna Clyne
