= Midnight basketball =

American youth sports program

Midnight Basketball League Program is an initiative which developed in 1986 to curb inner-city crime in the United States by keeping urban youth off the streets and engaging them with alternatives to drugs and crime. It was founded by G. Van Standifer in 1986. Young people aged from 14 to 29, mostly men of various minority groups, could go and play basketball during the peak crime hours of 10pm to 2am, immediately, thereafter, attending informative programs that gave them helpful skills for everyday life. It was a way for young men to form a sense of community, get out of a dangerous environment, and give them a sense of hope for the future. Midnight basketball helped decrease crime in the neighbourhoods where it was run, and it was a positive outlet for many young men. It helped many stay out of trouble and off the streets. By 2019, various cities in the United States brought back the program. In 2026 cities are again championing the program in cites like Atlanta and Los Angeles where crime rates are falling again.

== History ==
=== The beginnings of midnight basketball ===
Midnight basketball began in Glenarden, Maryland, in 1986, when crack cocaine first came to Washington. The program was started when Van Standifer noticed that the crime rates were incredibly high especially during the hours of 10 pm and 2 am. He observed that young men had nothing to do, as many did not have jobs, were living in poverty and could not always afford to do something. He opened Glenarden Recreation Center, funded by both private donations and public funds. They ran during those specific hours, where young men could come and play basketball. It was run by volunteers and supervised by officers to make sure everything was alright. Even the officers complimented how well the programs were working and what a benefit it was to the community. Afterwards, participants would have to attend workshops that informed them about different necessities for living. It lowered crime rates in the area, and the programs were found to be incredibly helpful to the young men. Soon other communities saw the merit in the program and started to adopt Midnight Basketball themselves. It was later added to the Violent Crime Control and Law Enforcement Act of 1994 and was signed by President Bill Clinton.

== The Crime Bill ==
In 1994, Clinton pushed for an anti-crime bill that would lead to 100,000 more police officers as well as a number of programs intended to "deter crime where it starts" by providing "community activities like midnight basketball." At the time of its inception, despite being racially coded, it was a relatively unknown and uncontroversial piece of policy innovation. However, once Clinton's anti-crime bill was being debated about five years after the creation of Midnight Basketball, it became a highly contentious part of the bill. This was striking because the initiative only made up $50 million of the original $33 billion bill. Midnight Basketball's initiative was already racially coded, so when lawmakers were discussing whether it was a positive or negative part of this massive bill, it was part of a covert racial dialogue. It was argued that race was the key to midnight basketball's importance. The influence of the media associating crimes with African Americans actually made crime seem more dangerous, and there was more want for anti-crime programs.

== Reception ==
The plan was widely criticized by conservatives such as House Minority Whip Newt Gingrich, who cited midnight basketball as an ineffective and wasteful use of federal funds. Some, such as Rush Limbaugh, even called the proposal racist, given the largely African American populations targeted by the program. Midnight basketball was not a proposal unique to the Democrats as it was one of George H. W. Bush's "thousand points of light". It was also argued that violence portrayed in the media could influence young African American men and actually raise the crime rate, so there was some action taken to try to reduce the crime and violence shown to the younger generation. When Midnight Basketball was discussed in the media in relation to the anti-crime bill, 98.2 percent of the time it was being shown negatively was when it was coming from an identifiable conservative-Republican. On the other hand, when a liberal-Democratic source discussed it, it was shown in a positive light 97.9 percent of the time. It was even referred to as social engineering by some Republican opponents. Midnight Basketball became the symbol of the overall anti-crime bill struggle. Specifically, it allowed racial issues to be explicitly talked about, and because Midnight Basketball was almost completely for crime prevention in minorities, it helped make young African-American men the face of crime.

== Programs ==
Either before or after participants would play in their basketball games, they would have to attend informal workshops or programs on different life skills. Programs would be aimed to provide assistance and advice to different groups of young people, mostly male minorities, including the unemployed, impoverished, ex-convicts, and young males. The programs goals were to help young people get to a place where they would be self-sufficient and well-versed in how to act and live successfully, while staying away from violent or harmful situations. It helped many young men who went back to school, and got jobs, all while staying off the streets.

=== The Service Categories ===
The main focus of the programs include:

1. Education/Adult Education
2. Youth Development/Youth Development Programs
3. Employment/Employment Preparation and Procurement

A list of some content of different sessions include:

- Health and Wellness
- Leadership Empowerment
- High School Diploma/GED
- Economic Prep
- Respect for Women

== Effectiveness ==
Empirically, a 2006 study of the 1990-1994 period during which rates of most crimes in the United States peaked, and when urban midnight basketball programs were initiated as a crime-prevention strategy, found that—while confounding factors were likely involved—property crime rates fell more rapidly in cities that were early adopters of the original midnight basketball model than in other American cities in the same period. It shows that there was a drop in crime rates in places where these programs were taking place. There was a 30% drop in crime in Glenarden, where the program began, and Phoenix had 10.4% less juvenile arrests and 50% less juvenile related incidents. In one Los Angeles Times article, it is stated that "There was a 60% reduction in drug-related crime." Although there was uncertainty about this statistic, as the Chicago leagues had only 160 participants and there were still around 85,000 young adults across the city that were at risk, which made the statistics seem unrealistic. Participants were not at risk of committing a crime when they attended basketball, and there were police officers stationed in the building to make sure of this. An article from Texas stated that it "has cut crime in one Fort Worth neighborhood 89 percent on nights when games are held." As well, "Murders, rapes, robberies and burglaries dropped to zero during the late-night games." The program helps show the young men a sense of community, friendship, and sportsmanship that they wouldn't have gotten to experience on the streets. There are some people who believed that it would actually increase crime because it would bring at-risk people into a group together, and it might encourage gangs. However, this is not the case, and the program has been very successful, and a program has even started in Australia. It has helped give young men an alternative to crime, and many have found jobs or are seeking further education.

== Revival ==
By 2019, various cities in the United States had brought back their midnight basketball programs.

== See also ==
- Midnight league
- Violent Crime Control and Law Enforcement Act of 1994
