= Industrial Toys =

American developer and publisher of mobile games

- Type: Subsidiary
- Industry: Video games
- Founded: January 2012; 14 years ago
- Founders: Alex Seropian; Tim Harris; Brent Pease
- Defunct: January 31, 2023
- Fate: Dissolved
- Headquarters: Pasadena, California, U.S.
- Key people: Alex Seropian (CEO); Tim Harris (president); Brent Pease (CTO); Mike Dekoekkoek (development director)
- Products: Midnight Star
- Number of employees: 60
- Parent: EA Mobile (2018–2023)
- Website: www.ea.com/ea-studios/industrial-toys

Industrial Toys was an American developer/publisher of mobile games headquartered in Pasadena, California. It produced mobile games for core gamers and released its first title, Midnight Star, in early 2015.

In July 2018, Electronic Arts acquired the company. Industrial Toys was put to work on a mobile Battlefield title, but when it was canceled, Electronic Arts made the decision to close down Industrial Toys on January 31, 2023.

== History ==
Early in 2012, founders Alex Seropian, Tim Harris, and Brent Pease formed the company under the premise that there weren't enough great mobile games for gamers. Core gaming site, Joystiq reported, "Halo co-creator and Bungie co-founder Alex Seropian has embarked on yet another new venture. After founding Wideload Games almost ten years ago and then joining Disney Interactive as head of game development for a few years, Seropian has now started up a company named Industrial Toys. Along with 'some kickass art talent from ex-Marvel and DC guys,' as president Tim Harris (formerly of Seven Lights) puts it, Seropian and the rest of the company plan to make hardcore games for mobile platforms. 'We're going deep on story and community and all sorts of nerdy goodness,' says Harris."

Along with engineer Mike Dekoekkoek, the team started work on its first game, Midnight Star, in January 2012. Its second title, Midnight Star: Renegade, was released in August 2016.

== Approach ==
CEO Alex Seropian explained to GameSpot "The things that we're focused on simply fall into three categories: plan, team, and execution. Our plan is really to treat the device like it's its own platform. So many core offerings are brought over to the platform from other places, and the ones that aren't are developed with that mind-set. So one of the things we're working on constantly doing is tearing away those preconceptions of what a core game is and starting over with the ideas that we have on that mobile platform. And it really just boils down to designing for the device.

"The second thing is our team. We are going to invest millions in this space. And we are assembling what I think is a dream team to go after core gamers on mobile, and we haven't even announced half the folks that are working on our first project. In the coming months we hope to be able to talk about more of the people who are working on it. And I think that's one of the most fundamental things about it, is the talent.

"And the third bit, about execution, it really comes down to production value. The teams that are working really well on mobile right now I think bring a lot of production value but don't necessarily bring a lot of scope, which I think makes a lot of sense for the device. Because the play pattern on mobile is so much different from other platforms in terms of how people engage with the game. Some people will sit on a couch for a long time, but often they don't. Often they'll be in and out. And you have to keep that in mind, to design to that play pattern. How you treat scope has a big impact on that. Designing big long levels where you have to engage 30 minutes at a time doesn't work so well. Creating scope for production value is good…everyone loves production value, right? Great story, great visuals--bringing that to the platform could be really cool."

== Games ==
Release date	Title	Publisher	Genre(s)	Platform(s)
February 5, 2015	Midnight Star	Industrial Toys	First-person shooter	iOS
August 11, 2016	Midnight Star: Renegade	Industrial Toys	First-person shooter	iOS
Cancelled	Battlefield Mobile	Electronic Arts	First-person shooter	Android, iOS
