= Land of the Midnight Sun =

Land of the Midnight Sun may refer to:

- Sweden
- Norway
- Finland
- Any of the world's northern regions above (or close to) the Arctic Circle, i.e. the Arctic
- Any of the world's southern regions below (or close to) the Antarctic Circle, usually Antarctica
- A nickname to the U.S. state of Alaska and the Yukon of Canada
- Land of the Midnight Sun (album), a 1976 album by Al Di Meola
- Land of the Midnight Sun, a song from the 2009 album Ancient Journeys by Cusco
- The Land of the Midnight Sun, a book in two volumes, by Paul Du Chaillu

== See also ==
- Midnight sun, the phenomenon affecting the polar regions (and slightly lower latitudes) where the sun shines at local midnight around summer solstice
