= Midnight league =

Midnight leagues are a series of initiatives in the United States, starting in the 1990s with midnight basketball and expanding into other sports, notably association football, where vulnerable urban youth could assemble during the night, and keep themselves off the streets while engaging with sports alternatives to drugs and crime.

Juvenile delinquency rates usually peak during night hours. Empirically, a 2006 study of the 1990-1994 period when urban midnight basketball programs were first initiated as a crime-prevention strategy, found that—while confounding factors were likely involved—property crime rates fell more rapidly in cities that were early adopters of the original midnight basketball model than in other American cities in the same period.
