= Midnight (Wilson novel) =

2004 novel by Jacqueline Wilson

- First edition cover design
- Author: Jacqueline Wilson
- Illustrator: Nick Sharratt
- Language: English
- Genre: Children's novel, Fantasy
- Publisher: Doubleday (first edition, hardback)
- Publication date: 2004
- Publication place: United Kingdom
- Preceded by: Lola Rose
- Followed by: Best Friends

Midnight is a 2004 children's novel by English author Jacqueline Wilson.

== Plot ==
The book is about a 13-year-old girl called Violet and her older 15-year-old brother, Will. Violet is a dreamy girl who is described as having long, thick hair and being small and skinny for her age. She is always away in her own world, filled with fairies designed by her favorite author, Casper Dream. Last Christmas, they found out that Will was adopted when Will was rude to their grandmother, and she said something about bad blood. Violet is extremely depressed to see how weak her mother is, and how she does everything her father tells her to do and does not care that her husband has no respect for her whatsoever; because it reminds her of herself, and how she always does what Will tells her to do. After Will forces her to play a game of 'Blind Man's Buff', a game she hates, she gets attacked by bats and Violet resolves to never let Will order her about again.

Moving on in the story, a new girl, Jasmine Day, comes to Violet's school and she chooses her as a friend. Violet is thrilled and spends a lot of time with Jasmine. Even though she adores Will, Violet refuses to spend a day with him, to go to Brompton Woods, and instead chooses to go to Jasmine's house.

Later on, Violet's father says that they are to go to their Gran's house to wish her a happy birthday, but Will refuses because how she had charmlessly told him that he was adopted. Violet's dad gets mad and when Violet says no as well, he is ready to hit them. But doesn't. Violet's mother - as usual - gives in and makes a fuss when she finds out that they both are not going. In the end, they leave without them. Will and Violet start playing 'Truth or Dare and Will asks Violet if she could have a love affair with anyone, who would it be? Violet hesitates and eventually answers Casper Dream. Violet repeats the question to Will but before he can answer, Jasmine calls and asks for help with her homework. Much to Violet's surprise, as he hates for her to have friends over, Will invites Jasmine himself.

They work for a while and then start up 'Truth or Dare' again, where Will asks Violet who she likes better, him or Jasmine. When Violet fails to respond, Will dares her to spend ten minutes in the attic. Violet reluctantly agrees. In the attic, Violet finds out that she used to have another brother named Will, but he died shortly after he was born, so her parents tried to replace him with her Will. Violet is ecstatic and can't wait to tell her brother. When Violet comes down after her ten minutes, she finds Will and Jasmine kissing. They make fun of her and the fairies she has hanging from the ceiling in her room. Violet feels betrayed because she thinks Will is trying to hurt her and Jasmine was only friends with her so she could be with Will. After smashing up her fairies (scratching Will with her Crow Fairy in the process), Violet runs away to see Casper Dream's old house, to find some magic in her sad world. There she finds Casper Dream himself and they become good friends.

She returns home and learns that Jasmine was a true friend to her after all. She forgives both Jasmine and Will. In the end, she confronts her parents' about the first Will. They have a little talk and soon things begin to be better after all for Violet. Violet starts creating a little figure; a changeling baby, signifying Will. Will gives Violet a note to tell her to look out her window at midnight and she sees her fairies hanging from the garden tree, repaired by Will.
