= At Midnight =

At Midnight may refer to:

- @midnight, or At Midnight, a Comedy Central series hosted by Chris Hardwick
- At Midnight (1913 film), an American short silent film
- At Midnight (2023 film), an American romantic comedy film
- At Midnight (EP), a 2019 release by American contemporary worship band Elevation Worship
- "At Midnight (My Love Will Lift You Up)", a 1977 song by R&B/funk band Rufus featuring Chaka Khan
- "At Midnight", a 1989 song by the Mighty Lemon Drops from the album Laughter

== See also ==
- After Midnight (disambiguation)
- Before Midnight (disambiguation)
