= Midnight Star (video game) =

2015 video game

- Developer: Industrial Toys
- Publisher: Industrial Toys
- Designer: Alex Seropian
- Writer: John Scalzi
- Composer: Serj Tankian
- Engine: Unreal Engine 3
- Platform: iOS
- Release: February 5, 2015
- Genre: First-person shooter
- Modes: Single-player, multiplayer

Midnight Star is a first-person shooter video game developed by Industrial Toys, the company's debut product. It was released on February 5, 2015 for iOS devices, with other platforms to be available later. Set 120 years into the future, the game takes players aboard the MSRV-Joplin, a research vessel newly outfitted with military weaponry to explore a mysterious signal coming from within the Solar System. When disaster strikes, the Joplin crew is transported across the universe to take part in a war that is not their own.

== Gameplay ==
In this scene, the player must battle a squad of enemy characters-- known as the Dust-- in defense of the alien world they find themselves on.

Midnight Star is a mobile sci-fi shooter that requires the player to perform combat tasks and upgrade weapons to advance through the game.

Video game website Joystiq wrote "The first video and screenshots of Midnight Star, along with details of an interstellar, time-paradoxical story and a devastating war, seem to justify Industrial Toys' bold pitch, promising a fresh approach to mobile gaming in more than just PR BS."

'We spent the last six or seven months in heavy R&D, in lab coats, figuring out how to create a control system that felt right,' Harris says. 'You've heard us dump on virtual joysticks and other things that have been ported over from console gaming to touch, and we've eschewed that completely. Once we got that right, we saw a whole bunch of cascading effects of that control scheme, into every aspect of the game: from the way we build encounters and levels, to the way we create our guns and bad guys. So the control scheme will be a big thing.'"

The game features both a single-player and an asynchronous multiplayer system that attempts to fit within mobile play patterns while offering a longer-term immersion experience. "With Midnight Star, we're looking to change expectations for what kind of experience core gamers get from their mobile devices," Industrial Toys CEO Alex Seropian told gaming website Polygon. "We're breaking new ground on everything from the visuals to the story to the ongoing support we'll provide in the way of content, events and player involvement. It's gonna be nuts."

== Plot ==
=== Setting ===
Most of the game is set on an alien world light years from Earth, but it begins 120 years in the future on Earth with a young graduate of West Point, Charlie Campbell as he prepares to join the crew of Morning Star Research Vessel (MSRV) Joplin to investigate an intelligent signal they received from Saturn's moon, Titan. The crew encounters a powerful artifact of obvious alien design, and after Charlie activates it, the rest of the game follows him as he travels back-and-forth from the Joplin to an alien planet whose mysteries he begins to discover.

As Charlie continues his journey, he learns about his mission, the intra-governmental agreement that sent him out to the outer reaches of the Solar System, and the conflict that he encounters on the alien world. With the help of his crew, he also starts to figure out how to undo the awful events of the early portion of the game by harnessing the changes that he begins to undergo.

=== Name ===
The title of Midnight Star is derived from the Morning Star Protocol, an agreement that the future nations of the Earth have adopted to react should humanity ever encounter an intelligent alien signal or communication. The agreement allows for a coordinated effort to investigate, encounter and react to the behaviors of the alien race or technology, be it welcoming, hostile or otherwise. Should it be welcoming, the signal is designated "Morning." If it is hostile, the signal is designated "Midnight."

=== Expansions ===
Midnight Star is a game designed to expand over time, so it was to be released in multiple installments that tell the story from the first encounter of the alien artifact to the eventual conclusion of the initial conflict.

== Midnight Rises ==
The story of how Charlie's mission came to be and the events leading up to the beginning of the game are told in Midnight Rises, a separate application and was released on January 29, 2015 for iOS devices. Written by John Scalzi with artwork from Mike Choi, Midnight Rises is a graphic novel experience that lets users investigate the back story, find hidden content and make choices for Charlie that affect the game itself. Readers learn more about the characters that populate the Midnight Star universe and what motivates them prior to the beginning of the game. The story of Midnight Rises begins with the reception of the first alien signal to Earth, introduces Charlie's history and culminates with the launching of the MSRV Joplin.

The application serves as a primer and source for all things Midnight Star, including a detailed timeline of Earth's history, personnel reports on Joplin crewmembers and background information on the technology featured in the game. In addition, playing through the Midnight Star game will unlock content in Midnight Rises, with sections of the application made available after getting to certain parts of the game.

== Sequel ==
In March 2016, Industrial Toys announced that the sequel would be titled Midnight Star: Renegade and it is set 120 years after the events of Midnight Star. It has been released for Android and iOS on 11 August 2016.
