= Midnight (Tor Miller song) =

Single by Tor Miller

from the album Headlights EP
- Released: February 2, 2015
- Length: 4:13
- Label: Glassnote
- Producer(s): Eliot James

"Midnight" is a song by the indie pop artist, Tor Miller, on his debut extended play, Headlights EP.

== Background and composition ==
When asked about "Midnight", Miller said that, "When I wrote 'Midnight...I had just flown to London for a long period of recording. During that time I was getting very into all these biographies and autobiographies about the '70s punk scene... 'Midnight' was almost like a love note for the city and in a strange way an homage to a bygone era." This track is a gospel-like, piano-driven song that lyrically touches about Miller's hometown, New York City. The song starts acoustically with piano, played by Tor Miller himself, before it slowly builds with background guitar, group harmonies, percussion, a string section, and falsetto by Miller. "Midnight" clocks at 4 minutes 13 seconds.

== Reception ==
The song has been positively by critics, with Zane Lowe of BBC Radio 1 announcing it to be the "Hottest Record In The World" for the week. Miller's husky, distinctive vocals is regarded as the highlight of the song, while the lyrics are also praise for its vivid and poetic description of the city.

== Music video ==
The music video for "Midnight" premiered on 9 March 2015. It is a black-and-white video in which Miller, wearing a long coat and neck scarf, is seen walking through New York City, featuring its traffic jams, stores, and subway during a cold midnight.
