= Midnight Cowboy (disambiguation) =

Midnight Cowboy is a 1969 American film.

Midnight Cowboy may also refer to:

- Midnight Cowboy (novel), a 1965 novel by James Leo Herlihy; basis for the film
- Midnight Cowboy Radio Network, now Red Eye Radio, an American syndicated talk radio program
- Midnight Cowboy, a 2006 play by Tim Fountain, adapted from the film
- "Midnight Cowboy", a 1969 instrumental song composed by John Barry
- "Midnight Cowboy", an instrumental cover of the film theme by Faith No More, on their 1992 album Angel Dust
- "Midnight Cowboy", a story in the comics series Hellboy: Weird Tales
- "Midnight Cowboy", a chapter of the manga series Cowboy Bebop: Shooting Star
- "Midnight cowboy", one of the personnel in a 3-day shift plan in the U.S. Navy
- "Midnight Cowboys", an episode of the TV series Fudge
- "Midnight Cowboy", the closing track off Charley Crockett's 2024 album, $10 Cowboy, originally written by Willie Edwards in 2021
- "Midnight Cowboy" (Jade Thirlwall song), 2024

== See also ==
- Manhattan Cowboy, a 1928 American silent film
- Cowboy in Manhattan, a 1943 American film
- Urban Cowboy, a 1980 American film
- Drugstore Cowboy, a 1989 American film
