= Round Midnight (Time-Life album) =

Round Midnight is a music compilation album under the Midnight Soul collection series. Distributed by Time-Life through its music division, the album was released on January 1, 2008 and featured fifteen urban contemporary R&B hits which were released between the late 1990s and the early 2000s.

== Track listing ==
1. Brandy - "Have You Ever?"
2. Ja Rule - "Always On Time"
3. Ashanti - "Foolish"
4. Brandy and Monica - "The Boy Is Mine"
5. Adina Howard - "Freak Like Me"
6. Chuckii Booker - "Games"
7. All-4-One - "I Swear"
8. Brownstone - "If You Love Me"
9. Carl Thomas - "I Wish"
10. TLC - "Waterfalls"
11. Tamia - "Stranger In My House"
12. Keith Sweat featuring Athena Cage - "Nobody"
13. Monica - "The First Night"
14. Lisa Fischer - "How Can I Ease the Pain"
15. Troop - "Spread My Wings"
