= Midnight Special =

Midnight Special may refer to:

== Music ==
- "Midnight Special" (song), a 1905 song popularized by Lead Belly
  - The Midnight Special and Other Southern Prison Songs, a 1940 album by Lead Belly
  - Midnight Special (Lead Belly album), 1947
- Midnight Special (Al Smith album), 1961
- Midnight Special (Harry Belafonte album), 1962
- Midnight Special (Jimmy Smith album), 1961
- Midnight Special (Uncle Kracker album), 2012

== Other ==
- Midnight Special (film), a 2016 feature film by Jeff Nichols
- The Midnight Special (film), a 1930 pre-Code sound film
- The Midnight Special (radio), an American syndicated folk and roots music program
- The Midnight Special (TV series), a 1972–1981 late-night American musical variety series
- The Midnight Special (train), an American night train formerly operated by the Chicago and Alton Railroad and the Gulf, Mobile and Ohio Railroad
