= Midnight Man (comics) =

Marvel Comics fictional character

Publication information
- Publisher: Marvel Comics
- First appearance: Moon Knight #3 (January 1981)
- Created by: Doug Moench and Bill Sienkiewicz

In-story information
- Alter ego: Anton Mogart
- Species: Human
- Abilities: Skilled thief and martial artist

Midnight Man (Anton Mogart) is a fictional character appearing in American comic books published by Marvel Comics.

Anton Mogart appears in the Marvel Cinematic Universe series Moon Knight (2022), portrayed by Gaspard Ulliel.

== Publication history ==
Midnight Man first appeared in Moon Knight #3 (January 1981), and was created by Doug Moench and Bill Sienkiewicz.

The character subsequently appears in Moon Knight #9–10 (July–August 1981).

== Fictional character biography ==
Anton Mogart is an art thief also known as the Midnight Man due to his thefts taking place at night. He is wealthy and steals items for the sake of owning them rather than their monetary value.

During a theft spree in New York City, Mogart steals a rare Monet painting. He is confronted by Moon Knight and falls into a nearby river, where he is presumed to have drowned. The river's current carries Mogart into the sewers, where exposure to waste melts and deforms his face. Three days later, Mogart returns to his home and learns that his stolen goods have been recovered in his absence. Blaming Moon Knight for his troubles, Mogart vows vengeance.

Later learning that he is dying from cancer, Mogart tracks down his illegitimate son Jeff Wilde and teaches him his skills, but begs him not to become a criminal like him. Mogart is killed in a subsequent battle with Moon Knight. Following Mogart's death, Wilde takes the alias Midnight and attempts to become the sidekick of Moon Knight, but instead ends up as a villain.

== Powers and abilities ==
Midnight Man has no powers, but is a skilled thief and hand-to-hand combatant. He additionally wields a handgun and dagger.

== In other media ==
Anton Mogart appears in the Moon Knight episode "The Friendly Type", portrayed by Gaspard Ulliel. Ulliel died before the series was released, with the episode being dedicated in his memory. This version is an antiquities collector and an acquaintance of Layla El-Faouly.
