= Midnight (DC Comics) =

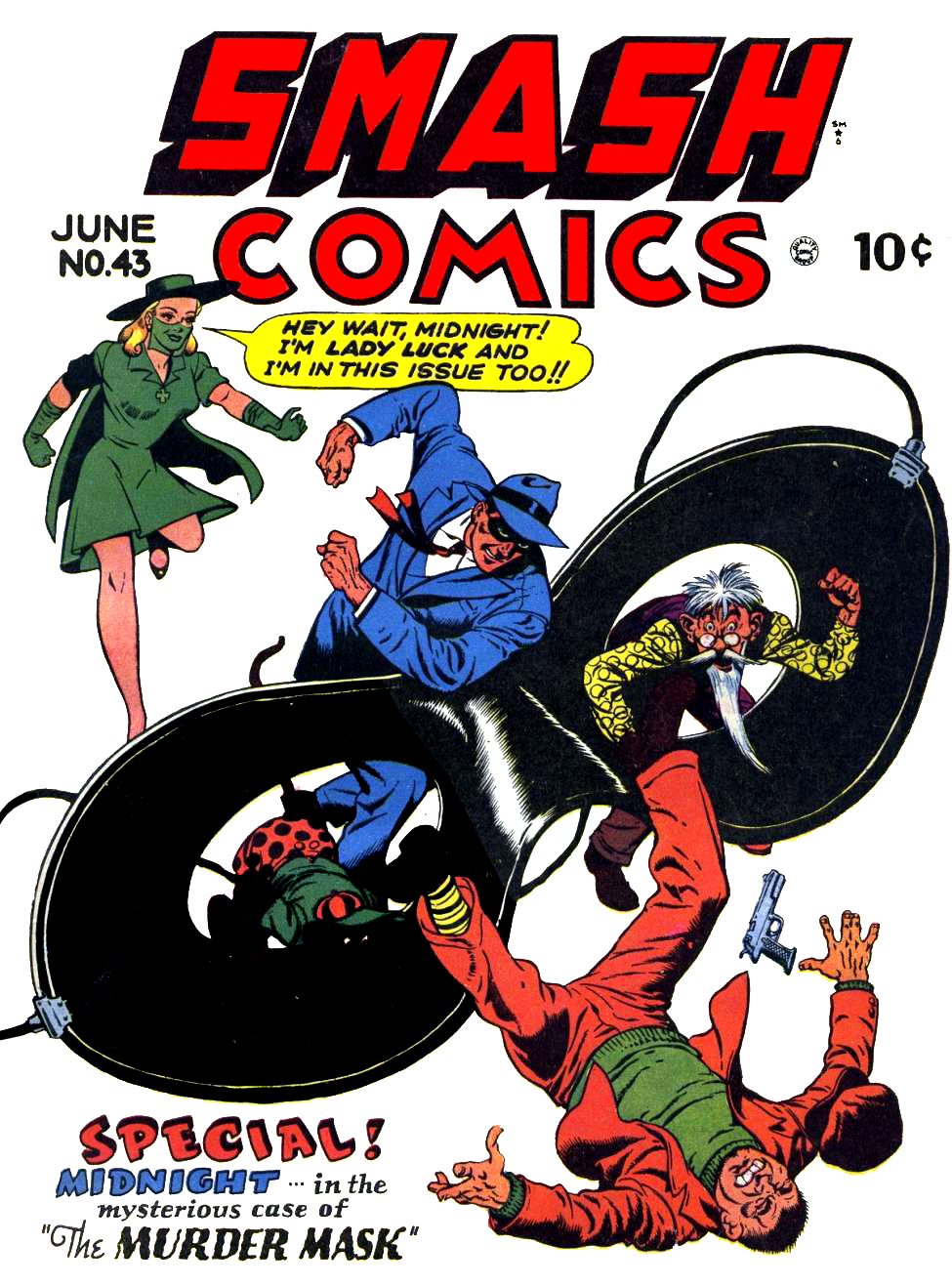
- Midnight and Lady Luck as depicted in Smash Comics #43 (June 1943). Art by Reed Crandall.

Publication information
- Publisher: Quality Comics/DC Comics
- First appearance: Smash Comics #18 (January 1941)
- Created by: Jack Cole

In-story information
- Alter ego: Dave Clark
- Team affiliations: UXAM (Radio Station); DC version only Freedom Fighters; All-Star Squadron
- Notable aliases: The Man at Midnight, The Man Called Midnight
- Abilities: Hand Gun; Expert fighter

Midnight (Dave Clark) is a fictional character owned by DC Comics. A masked detective, he was created by writer-artist Jack Cole for Quality Comics during the 1930s to 1940s period known as the Golden Age of Comic Books.

A female supervillain alien version of Midnight appeared in the fifth season of Supergirl, portrayed by Jennifer Cheon Garcia.

== Publication history ==
With writer-artist Will Eisner retaining rights to the masked-detective character the Spirit, Quality Comics publisher "Busy" Arnold, who published the comic-book version of this newspaper character, desired a hedge in case Eisner were killed or incapacitated during World War II. Arnold directed Jack Cole to create a similar character, which became Midnight. Midnight debuted in Smash Comics #18 (cover-dated Jan. 1941). The character became popular enough to become the cover feature with Smash Comics #28 (Nov. 1941), a position he would hold for nearly eight years until the title's cancellation with issue #85 (Oct. 1949).

== Fictional character biography ==
=== Dave Clark ===
Dave Clark is a radio announcer in Big City. He is an actor in a show named "The Man Called Midnight", about a masked crime fighter. After witnessing the collapse of a twelve-story building, he finds out that it had collapsed as a result of deliberate criminal negligence on the part of its builder, Morris Carleton. Clark decides to fight Carleton and force him to admit responsibility. To do this, he puts on a domino mask and assumes the identity of Midnight himself. After succeeding, he chooses to continue to fight crime as "Midnight, the eerie friend of the needy".

In Smash Comics #21, Midnight encounters the intelligent talking monkey Gabby. By the end of the story, the death of the scientist responsible leaves Gabby in Midnight's care, and the monkey becomes Midnight's sidekick. In Smash Comics #23, Midnight and Gabby face off against mad scientist Doc Wackey who, once captured, is talked into reforming and joins forces with Midnight. Doc Wackey and Gabby would continue to serve as Midnight's sidekicks (and often comic relief) for the remainder of Midnight's run on the title.

According to Jess Nevins' Encyclopedia of Golden Age Superheroes, Midnight "fights ordinary gangsters, the magician Chango (whose spells are in Pig Latin), the femme fatale Circle, the maniacal Laughing Killer, the Men from Mars, the Amazonian Robustia, and others".

Midnight was killed in Smash Comics #36, where he went to Hell at his own request so that he could attempt to fight the Devil himself. Midnight was resurrected at the end of the chapter thanks to a mad scientist. Eventually two more colorful characters joined the gang, inept private detective Sniffer Snoop and his pet Hotfoot, a baby polar bear.

Like the other Quality characters, Midnight was bought by DC Comics after Quality Comics folded in 1956, but has not been extensively used. Like most other Golden Age heroes, he made an appearance in Roy Thomas' All-Star Squadron, which Thomas used to feature every Golden Age character owned by DC. He also worked with the Freedom Fighters for some time.

In his sole post-Crisis appearance, a revised version of Midnight's origin written by Thomas and drawn by Gil Kane was published in Secret Origins #28. His base of operations was retconned into New York City. Midnight has not appeared since, and nothing is known of his fate after the 1940s.

=== Robert Avery/Robert Mason ===
A new Midnight was introduced in the 1990s in Ms. Tree Quarterly, but whether this Midnight has any connection to the original is unknown.

His secret identity was not mentioned in Ms. Tree Quarterly #1 (Summer 1990), #2 (Autumn 1990), #3 (Spring 1991), or #5 (Autumn 1991). In issue #4 (Summer 1991), he was named "Robert Avery". However, in issues #6 (Winter 1991) and #7 (Spring 1992), he was named "Robert Mason". It is unclear if either of those names are his true name.

=== Jack Sheriden ===
Jack Sheriden first appeared as Midnight in the backup story of Bug! The Adventures of Forager, "Midnight in the Phantom Zone" by James Harvey, from issues #3 (September 2017) to #6 (February 2018). Jack Sheriden's biography seems to be identical to that of Dave Clark's, referring to his job as a radio presenter/actor in "The Man Called Midnight", as well as his association with Doc Wackey and Gabby. Additionally, Jack refers to his time in Hell, at which point the reader is referred to Smash Comics #36.

He is said to be equipped with a "vacuum gun", a "2-way radio" and a "suit equipped with light-receptive vantablack filaments".

This iteration of Midnight is not traditionally heroic, as he mentions that he has multiple vices and seeks monetary compensation from a homeless man for his assistance.

Midnight enters the Phantom Zone against his will, handcuffed to criminal Sally Mae, to save her gang's leader, who became lost within. They are guided by a Kryptonian named Dig. For reasons which are unclear, it was necessary for Midnight to sacrifice himself so that the other three in his party might leave the Phantom Zone.

== Other versions ==
- In the Elseworlds miniseries JLA: Destiny, by John Arcudi and Tom Mandrake, a version of Midnight, named William Cole, exists in a world where Superman and Batman do not exist. He is a former Gotham City Police Department detective and a senior member of Thomas Wayne's Justice League of America, formerly the Justice League of Gotham, as Midnight.

== In other media ==
A female version of Midnight appears in the Supergirl episode "Event Horizon", portrayed by Jennifer Cheon Garcia. This version is an alien with vortex-based abilities who was imprisoned in the Phantom Zone by Martian Manhunter before being freed by Ma'alefa'ak using stolen Kryptonian technology. When Midnight attacks an evening party held by Lena Luthor, Kara Danvers uses a new suit created by Brainiac 5 to defeat her before sending her back to the Phantom Zone with a Phantom Zone projector.
