= The Midnights =

New Zealand reggae band

- Origin: Auckland, New Zealand
- Genres: Reggae, ska, Rocksteady
- Instrument(s): Guitar, drums, synthesizer, organ, percussion
- Years active: 2002–2012
- Labels: Loop Recordings
- Past members: Leo Horgan; Tisyn Watts; Patrick Iwobi; Chris Varnham; Tobias Wright; Berin Hunter; Erena Hodgkinson; Will Mark-Brown; Tuffy Culture; Isaac Sciascia

The Midnights were a contemporary New Zealand reggae band from Auckland's Grey Lynn. The band consisted of guitarist and vocalist Leo Horgan, backup vocalist Erena Hodgkinson, guitarist Tisyn Watts, keyboardist Chris Varnham, bassist Tobias Wright, drummer Berin Hunter and percussionist Patrick Iwobi. They are unusual among New Zealand reggae groups in their rocksteady and roots influenced sound.

== Career ==
The Midnights were formed in 2002 in Auckland by vocalist Leo Horgan, keyboardist Chris Varnham, bassist Tobias Wright and drummer Berin Hunter. In 2005, The Midnights released their debut EP named Hot Country.

In 2006, the band was joined by bassist Will-Mark Brown, MC and percussionist Tuffy Culture, percussionist Isaac Sciascia and backup vocalist Erena Hodgkinson.

On 12 December 2010, The Midnights released their first and last full-length debut album Outside.

== Discography ==
=== EPs ===
- Hot Country (2005)

=== Studio albums ===
- Outside (2010)

=== Singles ===
- Silhouette (2010)
- Name on the Door (2012)
