= USS Midnight (1861) =

Gunboat of the United States Navy

History

United States
- Acquired: 31 July 1861
- Commissioned: 19 October 1861
- Out of service: July 1865
- Fate: Sold, 1 November 1865

General characteristics
- Tonnage: 387
- Length: 126 ft (38 m)
- Beam: 27 ft 10 in (8.48 m)
- Draft: 11 ft (3.4 m)
- Propulsion: sail
- Complement: 70
- Armament: 6 × 32-pounder guns; 1 × 20-pounder Parrott rifle

USS Midnight was a steamer purchased by the Union Navy during the American Civil War. She was planned by the Union Navy for use as a gunboat stationed off Confederate waterways to prevent their trading with foreign countries.

== Service history ==
Midnight was purchased as Dawn by the Navy at New York City 31 July 1861 and commissioned at New York Navy Yard 19 October 1861, Acting Volunteer Lt. James Trathen in command. Assigned to the Gulf Blockading Squadron 2 November 1861, Midnight operated primarily along the southwestern coast of Texas, from time to time engaging Confederate coastal batteries as she served the Union blockade. Her faithful performance of duty in an area remote and neglected by war correspondents, illustrates the hardship often suffered by American sailors during the Civil War, in August 1862, as he reported sending Midnight home, Admiral Farragut commented: "The Midnight has been most active on the west coast of Texas and has been now constantly on blockade 9 months, during which time she has only had fresh provision 24 days ... Forty cases of scurvy, and dysentery [make it] impossible for such a crew to recruit in this climate."

Overhauled and her crew restored to health, Midnight arrived Port Royal, South Carolina, 16 October for service in the South Atlantic Blockading Squadron. For almost 2 years she continued this duty, a strong link in the chain which the Union Navy had forged and was drawing ever tighter around the Confederacy. On 3 February 1864 she captured British schooner Defy off Doboy Light, Georgia, sailing from Nassau to Beaufort, North Carolina with a cargo of salt for the South. Midnight was ordered to Philadelphia, Pennsylvania, 2 August for repairs. Midnight's last tour of duty took her to the East Gulf Blockading Squadron early in the fall. Besides serving in the blockade, she from time to time sent landing parties ashore in the vicinity of St. Andrews Bay, to gather information and to destroy Confederate resources.

Salt works were Midnight's favorite targets. Vast quantities of salt were needed by the South to preserve meat, fish and other perishable foods; to cure hides; and to bolster the Southern munitions industry. The Union Navy's systematic attacks on salt works seriously impaired the Confederacy's ability to remain at war. Midnight's most successful expedition began 1 February when a party landed at St. Andrews Bay. Three days later they returned to the ship, after destroying beyond repair several large salt plants and dumping tons of the precious chemical into the sea. Midnight served at St. Andrews Bay through the end of the war. She sailed north early in July and was sold at public auction in Boston, Massachusetts, to C. H. Miller 1 November 1865.
